= Samuel Patterson =

Samuel Patterson or Sam Patterson may refer to:

- Samuel F. Patterson (1799–1874), North Carolina politician, planter, and businessman
- Samuel James Patterson (born 1948), Northern Irish mathematician
- Samuel L. Patterson (1850–1908), North Carolina politician and farmer
- Sam Patterson (fl. 1917), American football coach
- Sam Patterson (footballer) (born 1993), English footballer

== See also ==
- Samuel Patterson House, in Derry Township, Westmoreland County, Pennsylvania, U.S.
