= Mark Ellis (footballer, born 1988) =

English footballer

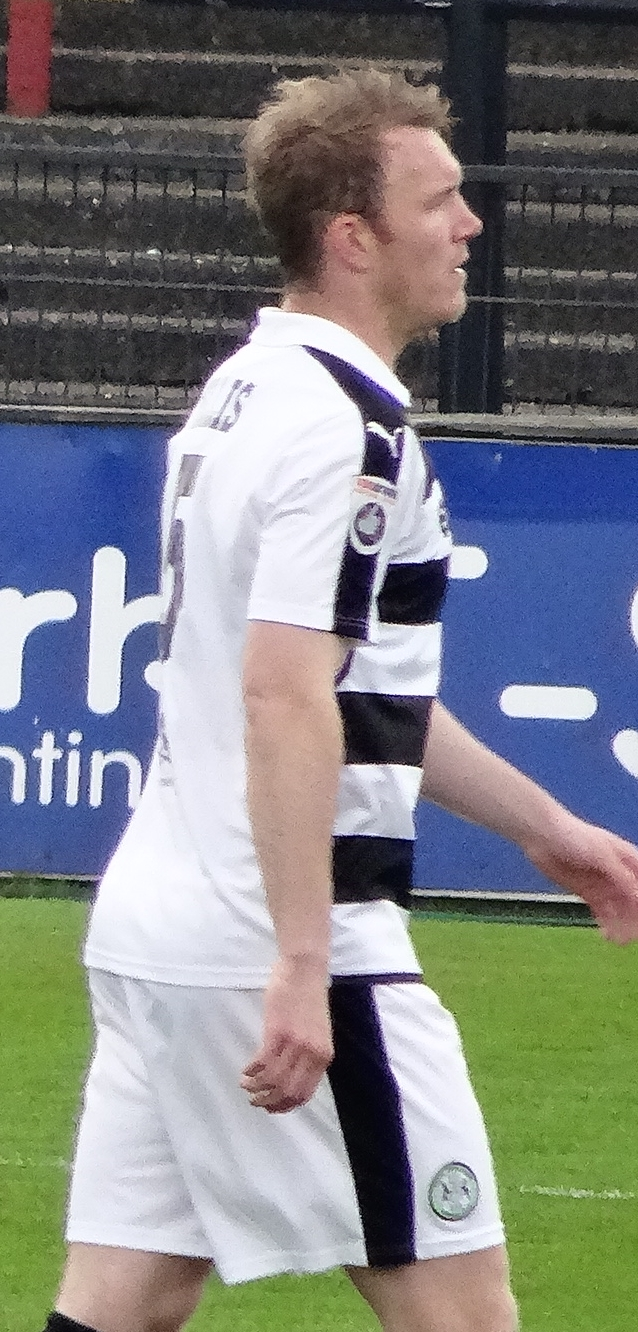
- Ellis in 2017

Personal information
- Full name: Mark Ian Ellis
- Date of birth: 30 September 1988 (age 38)
- Place of birth: Kingsbridge, England
- Height: 6 ft 2 in (1.88 m)
- Position: Defender

Team information
- Current team: Chorley
- Number: 3

Senior career*
Years	Team	Apps	(Gls)
2007–2008	Bolton Wanderers	0	(0)
2007–2008	→ Torquay United (loan)	22	(3)
2008–2012	Torquay United	98	(9)
2009	→ Forest Green Rovers (loan)	7	(0)
2012–2014	Crewe Alexandra	81	(6)
2014–2016	Shrewsbury Town	41	(3)
2015	→ Carlisle United (loan)	8	(0)
2016	→ Carlisle United (loan)	22	(0)
2016–2018	Carlisle United	30	(2)
2017	→ Forest Green Rovers (loan)	17	(2)
2017	→ Leyton Orient (loan)	7	(1)
2018–2021	Tranmere Rovers	35	(2)
2021	→ Notts County (loan)	21	(6)
2021–2023	Barrow	16	(0)
2022	→ Solihull Moors (loan)	8	(0)
2022	→ Torquay United (loan)	9	(2)
2023	→ York City (loan)	14	(0)
2023–	Chorley	122	(23)
- * Club domestic league appearances and goals as of 18:00, 26 April 2026 (UTC)

Mark Ian Ellis (born 30 September 1988) is an English footballer who plays as a defender for National League North club Chorley.

He began his career at Bolton Wanderers, and was the last footballer to sign a contract under Sam Allardyce, but without making a senior appearance. He has previously played in the Football league for Crewe Alexandra, Shrewsbury Town, Carlisle United and Tranmere Rovers as well as loan spells in the National League for Forest Green Rovers, Leyton Orient and Notts County and Solihull Moors.

== Career ==
=== Torquay United ===
Ellis was born in Kingsbridge, Devon. He made his debut for Torquay on 22 September 2007, in the Football Conference clash with Kidderminster Harriers, at Aggborough, which ended in a 5–2 win to Torquay. Following the Gulls promotion to the Football League, Ellis began the 2009–10 season on loan at Conference Premier club Forest Green Rovers.

=== Crewe Alexandra ===
Ellis turned down a new contract at Torquay United to join newly promoted Crewe Alexandra in League One on 27 June 2012. During his time at the club, he was part of the squad that won the 2012–13 Football League Trophy, also notably playing the full match as they beat Southend United 2–0 in the final at Wembley Stadium.

=== Shrewsbury Town ===
Following his release from Crewe Alexandra, Ellis joined up with Shrewsbury Town on 30 May 2014 on a two-year contract with an option for a further year. He made his debut on the opening day of the season against AFC Wimbledon, but found himself in and out of the starting eleven in the first few months of the season.

Due to the suspension of fellow defender Jermaine Grandison, he was recalled to the starting line-up and scored his first goal for the club in a 2–2 draw with local rivals Walsall in a first round FA Cup tie in November 2014. Although Grandison was reinstated for the following match, Ellis was recalled again after his teammate withdrew from the squad with illness against Cambridge United on 13 December. This time he kept his place in the team, helping Shrewsbury keep clean sheets against promotion rivals Wycombe Wanderers and Luton Town, and also scoring away at Oxford United in a 2–0 Boxing Day win.

Ellis became a first-team regular in the second half of the season as Shrewsbury were promoted back to League One at the first attempt, finishing as runners-up to Burton Albion. However, in October 2015, he returned to League Two, signing a one-month loan deal with Carlisle United after losing his place to emerging youngster Dominic Smith. Having been ever-present for Carlisle during his initial loan spell, the temporary deal was later extended to 2 January 2016.

=== Carlisle United ===
At the conclusion of his loan, Ellis signed permanently for Carlisle until summer 2018.

=== Forest Green Rovers ===
In January 2017, Ellis re-joined Forest Green Rovers on loan until the end of the season. He made his second debut for Forest Green on 28 January 2017 in a 3–2 away win at Barrow. Ellis returned to Carlisle at the end of his loan spell with Rovers.

=== Leyton Orient ===
On 28 September 2017, Ellis signed on a two-month loan with National League club Leyton Orient. He made his debut two days later in the 2–1 defeat at home to AFC Fylde.

=== Tranmere Rovers ===
On 21 May 2018 Ellis signed a two-year deal for newly promoted Tranmere after electing not to resign with Carlisle. Ellis ruptured his ACL in April 2019, making his return ten months later in a Cheshire Cup fixture against Crewe Alexandra. He signed a further one-year deal ahead of the 2020-21 season. On 8 March 2021, Ellis joined National League side Notts County on loan for the remainder of the 2020–21 season.

=== Barrow ===
Ellis signed for Barrow on a two-year deal on 18 June 2021. On 25 January 2022, Ellis joined National League side Solihull Moors on loan for the remainder of the 2021–22 season. He subsequently re-joined Torquay United on loan in October 2022. In February 2023, he returned to the National League with York City on loan until the end of the season. He was released at the end of the 2022–23 season.

=== Chorley ===
Ellis signed for National League North club Chorley on an initial one-year deal on 26 July 2023.

== Career statistics ==
As of end of 2022–23 season

Appearances and goals by club, season and competition
Club	Season	League			FA Cup		League Cup		Other		Total	
Club	Season	Division	Apps	Goals	Apps	Goals	Apps	Goals	Apps	Goals	Apps	Goals
Bolton Wanderers	2007–08	Premier League	0	0	0	0	0	0	0	0	0	0
Torquay United (loan)	2007–08	Conference Premier	22	3	1	0	~	~	1 (Note: Appearance in FA Trophy)	0	24	3
Torquay United	2008–09	Conference Premier	9	1	0	0	~	~	0	0	9	1
Torquay United	2009–10	League Two	27	3	1	0	0	0	1 (Note: Appearance(s) in Football League / EFL Trophy)	0	29	3
Torquay United	2010–11	League Two	27	2	4	0	1	0	2	0	34	2
Torquay United	2011–12	League Two	35	3	2	0	0	0	3 (Note: One appearance in Football League Trophy and two in League Two play-offs)	0	40	3
Torquay United	Total		120	12	8	0	1	0	7	0	136	12
Forest Green Rovers (loan)	2009–10	Conference Premier	7	0	0	0	~	~	0	0	7	0
Crewe Alexandra	2012–13	League One	44	5	2	1	2	0	4	0	52	6
Crewe Alexandra	2013–14	League One	37	1	1	0	0	0	2	0	40	1
Crewe Alexandra	Total		81	6	3	1	2	0	6	0	92	7
Shrewsbury Town	2014–15	League Two	32	2	1	1	1	0	1	0	35	3
Shrewsbury Town	2015–16	League One	9	1	0	0	1	0	2	0	12	1
Shrewsbury Town	Total		41	3	2	0	1	1	3	0	47	4
Carlisle United (loan)	2015–16	League Two	8	0	2	0	0	0	0	0	10	0
Carlisle United (loan)	2015–16	League Two	22	0	3	1	0	0	0	0	25	1
Carlisle United	2016–17	League Two	7	0	1	0	2	0	2	0	12	0
Carlisle United	2017–18	League Two	23	2	1	0	2	0	1	0	27	2
Carlisle United	Total		30	2	2	0	4	0	3	0	39	2
Forest Green Rovers (loan)	2016–17	National League	17	2	0	0	~	~	4 (Note: Three appearances in National League play-offs and one in FA Trophy)	0	21	2
Leyton Orient (loan)	2017–18	National League	7	1	0	0	~	~	0	0	7	1
Tranmere Rovers	2018–19	League Two	26	0	2	0	1	0	3	0	32	0
Tranmere Rovers	2019–20	League One	3	2	0	0	0	0	0	0	3	2
Tranmere Rovers	2020–21	League Two	6	0	0	0	0	0	3	0	9	0
Tranmere Rovers	Total		35	2	2	0	1	0	6	0	44	2
Notts County (loan)	2020–21	National League	19	5	0	0	~	~	3 (Note: Two appearances in National League play-offs and one in FA Trophy)	1	21	6
Barrow	2021–22	League Two	16	0	2	0	2	0	2	0	22	0
Barrow	2022–23	League Two	0	0	0	0	0	0	0	0	0	0
Barrow	Total		16	0	2	0	2	0	2	0	22	0
Solihull Moors (loan)	2021–22	National League	7	0	0	0	0	0	2	0	9	0
Torquay United (loan)	2022–23	National League	9	2	2	0	0	0	1	0	12	2
York City (loan)	2022–23	National League	14	0	0	0	0	0	0	0	14	0
Career total			433	35	25	3	12	0	37	1	507	39

== Honours ==
Crewe Alexandra

- Football League Trophy: 2012–13

Shrewsbury Town

- Football League Two second-place promotion: 2014–15

Individual

- National League North Team of the Season: 2024–25
