= Andy Mangan =

English footballer (born 1986)

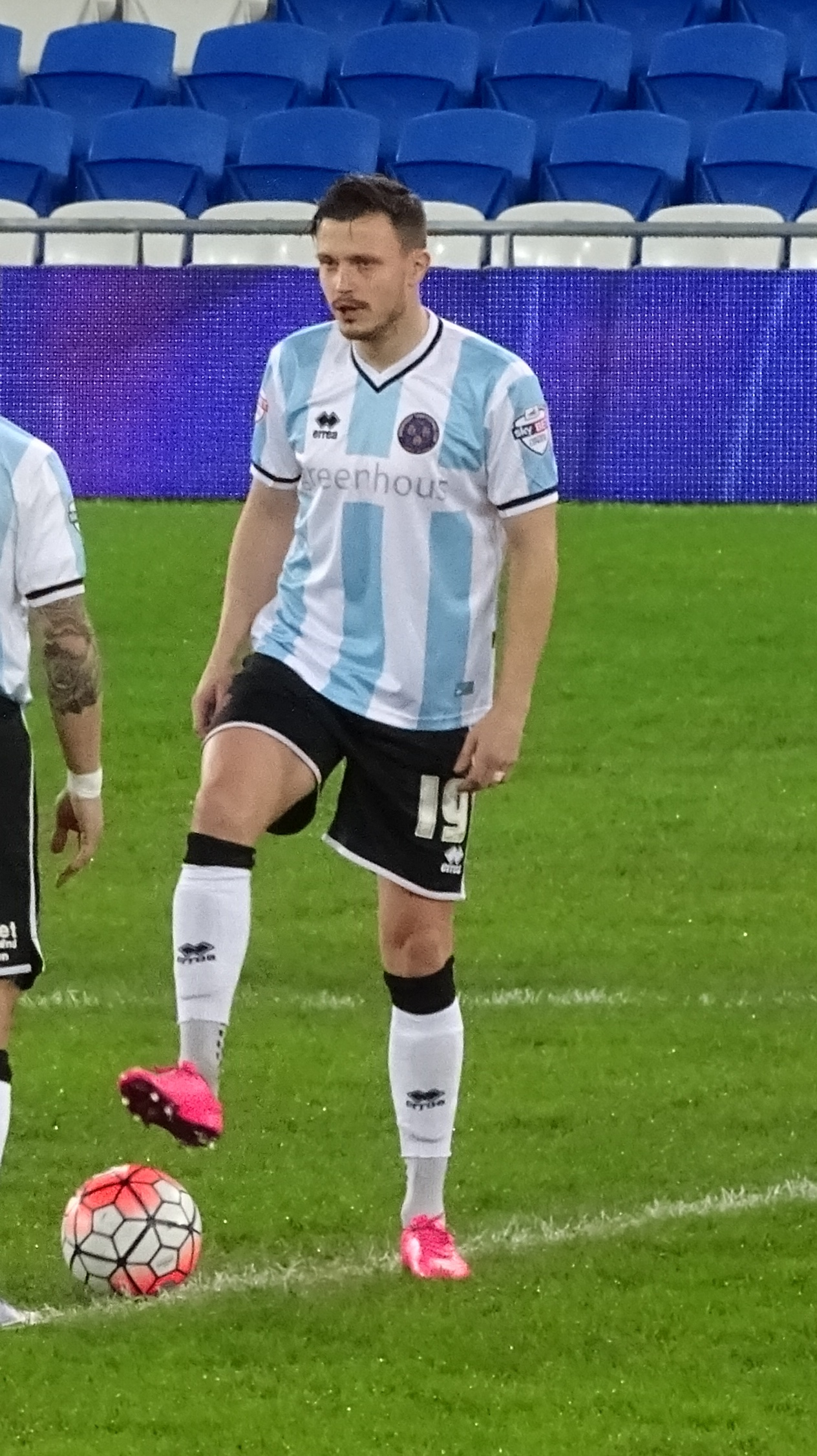
- Mangan playing for Shrewsbury Town in 2016

Personal information
- Full name: Andrew Francis Mangan
- Date of birth: 30 August 1986 (age 40)
- Place of birth: Liverpool, England
- Height: 6 ft 0 in (1.83 m)
- Position: Striker

Team information
- Current team: Lille (assistant manager)

Youth career
- Bolton Wanderers

Senior career*
Years	Team	Apps	(Gls)
2004–2005	Blackpool	2	(0)
2005	→ Hyde United (loan)	7	(2)
2005–2007	Accrington Stanley	70	(9)
2007–2008	Bury	20	(5)
2008	→ Accrington Stanley (loan)	7	(1)
2008–2010	Forest Green Rovers	41	(26)
2010–2011	Wrexham	65	(24)
2011–2013	Fleetwood Town	53	(24)
2013–2014	Forest Green Rovers	9	(0)
2014	→ Luton Town (loan)	0	(0)
2014–2015	Shrewsbury Town	30	(8)
2015–2016	Tranmere Rovers	22	(7)
2016	Shrewsbury Town	29	(5)
2016–2018	Tranmere Rovers	41	(3)
2017	→ AFC Fylde (loan)	4	(0)
2018	Bala Town	0	(0)
2018	Accrington Stanley	3	(0)
Total		403	(114)

International career
2011	England C	1	(0)

Managerial career
- 2023: Bristol Rovers (caretaker)
- * Club domestic league appearances and goals

Andrew Francis Mangan (born 30 August 1986) is an English professional football manager and former player who played as a striker. He is currently assistant manager of Ligue 1 club Lille.

== Career ==
=== Blackpool ===
Born in Liverpool, Mangan began his career with Blackpool at the age of 15. He was with the club for three years, scoring 49 goals in reserve and youth team football. Mangan made his professional debut at the age of 17 in a 1–0 defeat to Chesterfield on 24 April 2004. He made just one further professional appearance at Blackpool under Steve McMahon's management and his replacement, Colin Hendry, loaned Mangan to Northern Premier League Premier Division side Hyde United. He scored two goals in seven appearances, helping the club to secure the league title. Mangan was released by Blackpool at the end of the 2004–05 season.

=== Accrington Stanley ===
Mangan was heavily linked with a return to Hyde the following season, but he rejected them in favour of a full-time contract with Conference Premier side Accrington Stanley, after impressing during the club's pre-season schedule. After making his debut in a 1–0 win over Canvey Island on 13 August 2005, Mangan scored his first goal for the club in his third appearance during a 3–1 defeat to Cambridge United. In his first full season, Mangan played in 45 league and cup games, scoring ten goals, and was primarily used as a substitute. His goals helped Accrington gain promotion to The Football League at the end of the 2005–06 season; the first time the club had achieved this in 50 years. In his second year at the club, Mangan became frustrated with his lack of starts. From his 38 total appearances, of which only five were made in the starting XI, he scored six goals. At the end of the 2006–07 season, Mangan was offered a two-year deal by Accrington, but rejected it in favour of League Two side Bury, having appeared in a pre-season friendly for the club against Everton.

=== Bury ===
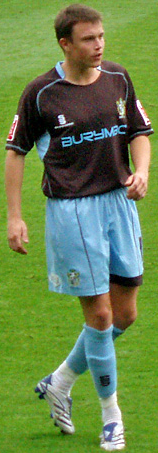
Mangan playing for Bury in 2007

At Bury, Mangan scored his first goal on 7 September 2007 with a header against Chesterfield, with five more goals coming before Christmas. He was injured at the beginning of December 2007 with a suspected hernia problem and later underwent surgery, restricting him to just six appearances in the rest of the season as he struggled to regain fitness. He made a total of 26 appearances in all competitions while with Bury. Following the sacking of Bury manager Chris Casper, Mangan was allowed to return to Accrington Stanley by his replacement Alan Knill on a one-month loan deal, scoring one goal in seven appearances. Mangan was released by Bury towards the end of the 2007–08 season.

=== Forest Green Rovers ===
In the summer of 2008, Mangan signed for Forest Green Rovers in the Conference Premier. It was at Forest Green that Mangan's goalscoring reputation began to form; his first season saw him finish as the league's top scorer with 26 goals in 41 games. Including cup competitions, Mangan made 49 appearances for the club, scoring 30 goals. These included hat-tricks against Torquay United, Lewes and Rushden & Diamonds. Mangan was voted player of the year by the Directors of Forest Green Rovers.

=== Wrexham ===
On 20 January 2009, Mangan completed a move to Wrexham for an undisclosed fee, making his debut on 23 January in a 1–0 victory over AFC Wimbledon, before scoring his first goal seven days later in his third appearance during a 3–1 over Altrincham. Mangan then scored his first home goal for Wrexham in a 2–1 victory over Mansfield Town. He ended the 2009–10 season with nine goals, the club's joint top scorer in a campaign which saw the side finish 11th. Mangan started the next season in an unfamiliar left-wing position; despite this he still finished as the club's top scorer with 16 league goals, helping them to the play-offs, where they lost to Luton Town.

=== Fleetwood Town ===
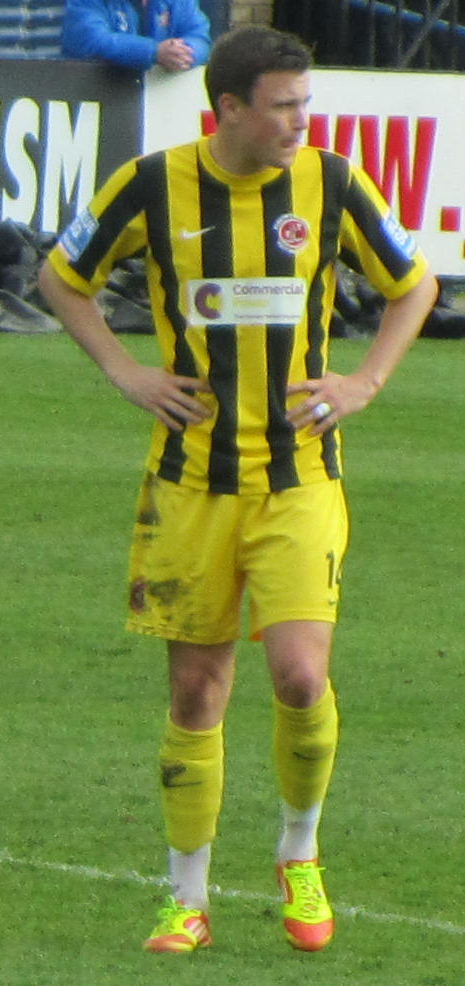
Mangan playing for Fleetwood Town in 2012

On 1 June 2011, he signed for Conference Premier side Fleetwood Town. It was announced on 7 May 2013, that Fleetwood would not be offering the striker a new contract, and would therefore be released.

=== Forest Green Rovers (second spell) ===
On 16 May 2013, Mangan returned to former club Forest Green Rovers on a three-year contract. He made his second debut for the club on 7 September 2013 in a draw with Braintree Town. On 5 February 2014, several months after he had been suspended by the club in October 2013, he had his contract terminated. Mangan appealed against his dismissal from the club, so remained a registered Forest Green player pending the outcome of the appeal. He subsequently joined Conference Premier leaders Luton Town on loan on 1 April 2014 for the remainder of the 2013–14 season.

In June 2014, it was announced that Mangan had won his appeal against Forest Green and had returned to the club under his previous contract as a player.

=== Shrewsbury Town ===
On 24 July 2014, it was announced that Mangan had signed a one-year deal at League Two club Shrewsbury Town.

He made his Shrewsbury debut as a substitute away at Wimbledon on 9 August, and scored his first goal for the club a week later against Tranmere Rovers, also providing an assist for Mickey Demetriou's] injury time winning goal at New Meadow. Mangan earned his first start for the club three days later, scoring twice and winning a penalty in a 4–0 win over former club Accrington Stanley.

On 26 August, he scored the only goal from a free kick as Shrewsbury won away at Leicester City, knocking the Premier League opponents out of the League Cup. The club ultimately reached the fourth round of the competition, drawing Chelsea at home. Mangan scored a late goal to level the scores at 1–1, just moments after entering the field as a substitute, although Chelsea restored their lead minutes later to win the tie 2–1.

By the end of October 2014, Mangan was joint top scorer at Shrewsbury, alongside James Collins, having scored six goals in all competitions. His seventh goal came days after the Chelsea match, equalising with a half volley away at Dagenham and Redbridge, before winning an injury time penalty which was converted by teammate Liam Lawrence to secure Shrewsbury's fifth straight win in the league. The requirement to carefully manage an ongoing knee injury restricted Mangan's match time over the next few months, although he still managed to score a late winner against Morecambe in December after coming on as a substitute. He marked his first start since November by scoring a brace and providing an assist in a 3–0 home win against Hartlepool United on 17 January 2015, to help move Shrewsbury back into the League Two automatic promotion places.

Shrewsbury were subsequently promoted back to League One at the first attempt, following a 1–0 away win at Cheltenham Town in April 2015, however due to Financial Fair Play restrictions, they were unable to offer Mangan an extension to his contract.

=== Tranmere Rovers ===
Mangan joined Tranmere Rovers of the National League on 2 July 2015, signing a one-year contract. He scored seven goals in the first half of the season, including five in four matches during September and October, but lost his place in the team due to injury and manager Gary Brabin's subsequent tactical switch to a 4–5–1 formation with James Norwood preferred in the lone strikers role.

=== Shrewsbury Town (second spell) ===
After losing a regular place at Tranmere, Shrewsbury Town made an enquiry about Mangan's availability in the next transfer window. He rejoined the club on an 18-month contract on 7 January 2016. He made his return debut in an FA Cup tie away at Cardiff City three days later, scoring the only goal in a 1–0 victory, sending Shrewsbury through to the fourth-round for the first time since 2002–03. He missed a penalty on his home return against Barnsley, but scored a second-half equaliser at Burton Albion the following week, with Shrewsbury going on to win 2–1 at the league leaders. Mangan scored five goals in nineteen league appearances in the second half of the 2015–16 season to help the club avoid relegation to League Two. During the 2015−16 season Mangan received the PFA community champion as recognition for his work with children in the Shrewsbury area.

=== Return to Tranmere Rovers ===
Mangan re-joined Tranmere Rovers for an undisclosed fee on 4 November 2016.

He was released by Tranmere at the end of the 2017–18 season.

=== Bala Town ===
On 17 June 2018, he joined Welsh Premier League side Bala Town. He made his debut for the club on 28 June 2018 in a 3–0 away Europa League preliminary round first leg defeat to S.P. Tre Fiori.

=== Accrington Stanley ===
Mangan departed Bala without playing a league game for them after receiving an offer from Accrington Stanley.

== Coaching career ==
=== Fleetwood Town ===
On 22 February 2019, Mangan joined the first-team coaching staff of Fleetwood Town, after a spell working with the youth team. Following the departure of manager Joey Barton in January 2021, Mangan also left the club.

=== Bristol Rovers ===
On 22 February 2021, Mangan followed Barton and Clint Hill from Fleetwood to Bristol Rovers, taking on the role as a first-team coach. Following the sacking of Barton in October 2023, Mangan was appointed caretaker manager. His first game in temporary charge took place 2 days later, picking up a 2-1 win at home to Northampton in League One. On 4 November 2023, during a 7-2 win in an FA Cup first round tie against Whitby Town, Mangan gave Ollie Dewsbury his senior debut, bringing him on as a substitute in the 87th minute. In doing so, Dewsbury became the second youngest player to ever represent the club, and the youngest to do so in the FA Cup at the age of 15 years and 255 days. Mangan won 8 points out of a possible 15 in League One during his tenure as caretaker manager at the club, with 2 wins, 2 draws and 1 defeat. He held the role until 1 December 2023 when Matt Taylor was appointed, Mangan leaving the club.

=== Stockport County ===
On 12 July 2024, Mangan joined the coaching staff of Stockport County as assistant coach with a focus on helping the attackers, having been with the club since March. On 10 September 2024 Mangan was denied a move to Real Madrid after being refused a work permit due to the fact that gaining one to work in Spain can take up to nine months post Brexit.

=== Botafogo ===
On 8 July 2025, Mangan was appointed assistant manager of Campeonato Brasileiro Série A club Botafogo, assisting the newly appointed Davide Ancelotti.

=== Swansea City ===
In April 2026, Mangan joined Championship club Swansea City as first-team consultant for the remainder of the season.

=== Brazil national team ===
Mangan was an opposition analyst for the Brazil national team for the 2026 FIFA World Cup, managed by Carlo Ancelotti.

=== Lille ===
In July 2026, Mangan was once again appointed assistant manager to Davide Ancelotti, joining Ligue 1 club Lille.

== Career statistics ==
Appearances and goals by club, season and competition
Club	Season	League			FA Cup		League Cup		Other		Total	
Club	Season	Division	Apps	Goals	Apps	Goals	Apps	Goals	Apps	Goals	Apps	Goals
Blackpool	2003–04	Second Division	2	0	0	0	0	0	0	0	2	0
Blackpool	2004–05	Second Division	0	0	0	0	0	0	0	0	0	0
Blackpool	Total		2	0	0	0	0	0	0	0	2	0
Hyde United (loan)	2004–05	NPL Premier Division	7	2	−		−		−		7	2
Accrington Stanley	2005–06	Conference	36	5	0	0	−		1 (Note: Appearance(s) in Football League Trophy)	1	37	6
Accrington Stanley	2006–07	League Two	34	4	1	0	0	0	3	0	38	4
Accrington Stanley	Total		70	9	1	0	0	0	4	1	75	10
Bury	2007–08	League Two	20	5	3	0	1	0	2	0	26	5
Accrington Stanley (loan)	2007–08	League Two	7	1	−		−		−		7	1
Forest Green Rovers	2008–09	Conference	41	26	3	0	−		2 (Note: Appearance(s) in FA Trophy)	0	46	26
Wrexham	2009–10	Conference	23	7	−		−		−		23	7
Wrexham	2010–11	Conference	42	15	0	0	−		2 (Note: Appearances in Conference play-offs)	1	44	16
Wrexham	Total		65	22	0	0	0	0	2	1	67	23
Fleetwood Town	2011–12	Conference	41	19	4	1	−		−		45	20
Fleetwood Town	2012–13	League Two	12	4	0	0	1	0	1	0	14	4
Fleetwood Town	Total		53	23	4	1	1	0	1	0	59	24
Forest Green Rovers	2013–14	Conference	9	0	0	0	−		−		9	0
Luton Town	2013–14	Conference	0	0	−		−		−		0	0
Shrewsbury Town	2014–15	League Two	30	8	2	0	4	2	0	0	36	10
Tranmere Rovers	2015–16	National League	22	7	0	0	−		1	0	23	7
Shrewsbury Town	2015–16	League One	19	5	3	1	−		−		22	6
Shrewsbury Town	2016–17	League One	10	0	−		1	0	2 (Note: Appearances in EFL Trophy)	0	13	0
Shrewsbury Town	Total		29	5	3	1	1	0	2	0	35	6
Tranmere Rovers	2016–17	National League	20	2	−		−		7 (Note: Four appearances and one goal in FA Trophy, three appearances in National League play-offs)	1	27	3
Tranmere Rovers	2017–18	National League	5	1	0	0	−		0	0	5	1
Tranmere Rovers	Total		25	3	0	0	0	0	7	1	32	4
Career total			380	111	16	2	7	2	21	3	425	118

== Managerial Statistics ==
As of 1 December 2023

Managerial record by team and tenure
Club	From	To	Record				
Club	From	To	P	W	D	L	Win %
Bristol Rovers (Caretaker Manager)	26 October 2023	1 December 2023	7	4	2	1	57.14
Total			7	4	2	1	57.14

== Honours ==
Accrington Stanley

- Football Conference: 2005–06

Fleetwood Town

- Football Conference: 2011–12

Tranmere Rovers

- National League play-offs: 2018
