= 2015–16 Shrewsbury Town F.C. season =

Shrewsbury Town
2015–16 season
- Chairman: Roland Wycherley
- Manager: Micky Mellon
- Stadium: New Meadow
- League One: 20th
- FA Cup: Fifth round (eliminated by Manchester United)
- League Cup: Second Round (eliminated by Crystal Palace)
- FL Trophy: Second Round (eliminated by Fleetwood Town)
- Shropshire Senior Cup: Winners
- Top goalscorer: League: Sullay Kaikai (12); All: Sullay Kaikai (12)
- Highest home attendance: 7,019 v Port Vale 25 March 2016 (League); 9,370 v Manchester United 22 February 2016 (All competitions)
- Lowest home attendance: 4,057 v Oldham Athletic 26 January 2016 (League); 587 v AFC Telford United 5 April 2016 (All competitions)
- Average home league attendance: 5,407
Home colours	Away colours	Third colours

The 2015–16 season was Shrewsbury Town's 130th year in existence and their first season back in League One after gaining promotion the previous season. Much of the season was spent fighting relegation, with safety only secured following the final home match of the season where despite losing to Peterborough United, same day defeats for Blackpool and Doncaster Rovers ensured another season of League One football with one game to spare.

The club also participated in the FA Cup, notably reaching the fifth round for the first time since 1991, and also reached the second rounds of both the League Cup and the Football League Trophy. A team consisting of fringe and youth players retained the Shropshire Senior Cup for the second consecutive season after beating AFC Telford United on penalties in the final.

The season covers the period from 1 July 2015 to 30 June 2016.

== Players ==
=== First team squad information ===
As of match played 8 May 2016.

No.	Name	Position	Nationality	Place of birth	Date of birth (age)	Club caps (all comps)	Club goals (all comps)	Signed from	Date signed	Fee	Contract End
Goalkeepers
1	Jayson Leutwiler	GK	(Switzerland)	Basel	25 April 1989 (age 37)	91	0	Middlesbrough	11 June 2014	Free	30 June 2016
21	Mark Halstead	GK	(England)	Blackpool	17 September 1990 (age 35)	21	0	Blackpool	5 June 2014	Free	30 June 2016
25	Callum Burton	GK	(England)	Newport, Shropshire	15 August 1996 (age 30)	1	0	Academy	24 February 2014	Trainee	30 June 2016
33	Shaun Rowley	GK	(England)	Shrewsbury	1 November 1996 (age 29)	0	0	Academy	1 July 2015	Trainee	30 June 2016
Defenders
2	Matt Tootle	RB	(England)	Knowsley	11 October 1990 (age 35)	18	1	Crewe Alexandra	1 July 2015	Free	30 June 2017
3	Mat Sadler	LB	(England)	Birmingham	26 February 1985 (age 41)	83	2	Rotherham United	1 July 2015	Free	30 June 2017
4	Zak Whitbread	CB	(United States)	Houston, Texas	4 March 1984 (age 42)	27	1	Free Agent	16 October 2015	Free	30 June 2016
5	Jermaine Grandison	CB/RB	(England)	Birmingham	15 December 1990 (age 35)	174	5	Coventry City	31 January 2011	Free	30 June 2016
12	Junior Brown	LB/LM	(England)	Crewe	7 May 1989 (age 37)	40	1	Mansfield Town	1 July 2015	Free	30 June 2016
15	Jack Grimmer	RB	(Scotland)	Aberdeen	5 January 1994 (age 32)	31	2	Fulham	5 January 2016	Loan	30 June 2016
18	Mickey Demetriou	LB	(England)	Durrington	12 March 1990 (age 36)	50	3	Kidderminster Harriers	2 June 2014	Free	30 June 2016
20	Nathaniel Knight-Percival	CB	(England)	Enfield	31 March 1987 (age 39)	77	6	Peterborough United	22 May 2014	Free	30 June 2016
24	Jack Hendry	CB	(Scotland)	Glasgow	7 May 1995 (age 31)	6	0	Wigan Athletic	23 March 2016	Loan	30 June 2016
31	Dominic Smith	CB/RB	(Wales)	(England) Shrewsbury	9 February 1996 (age 30)	24	0	Academy	26 December 2012	Trainee	30 June 2018
Midfielders
6	Ian Black	CM	(Scotland)	Edinburgh	14 March 1985 (age 41)	36	1	(Scotland) Rangers	14 September 2015	Free	30 June 2017
8	Richie Wellens	CM	(England)	Manchester	26 March 1980 (age 46)	12	0	Doncaster Rovers	8 January 2016	Free	30 June 2017
10	Shaun Whalley	RM	(England)	Prescot	7 August 1987 (age 39)	30	7	Luton Town	1 July 2015	Free	30 June 2017
14	James Wesolowski	CM	(Australia)	Sydney	25 August 1987 (age 39)	35	1	Oldham Athletic	6 June 2014	Free	30 June 2016
17	Abu Ogogo	CM	(England)	Epsom	3 November 1989 (age 36)	50	3	Dagenham & Redbridge	1 July 2015	Free	30 June 2017
22	Jordan Clark	LM/CM	(England)	Hoyland	22 September 1993 (age 32)	59	5	Barnsley	17 July 2014	Free	30 June 2016
27	James Caton	LM/RM	(England)	Widnes	4 January 1994 (age 32)	4	0	Blackpool	18 June 2014	Free	30 June 2016
29	Larnell Cole	LM/RM	(England)	Manchester	3 September 1993 (age 33)	34	3	Fulham	1 September 2015	Loan	30 June 2016
38	James Wallace	CM	(England)	Fazakerley	19 December 1991 (age 34)	11	0	Sheffield United	12 January 2016	Loan	30 June 2016
88	Elliot Grandin	LM	(France)	Caen	17 October 1987 (age 38)	0	0	Free Agent	6 February 2016	Free	30 June 2016
Forwards
7	Kyle Vassell	CF	(England)	Milton Keynes	7 February 1993 (age 33)	13	0	Peterborough United	8 January 2016	Loan	30 June 2016
9	James Collins	CF	(Republic of Ireland)	(England) Coventry	1 December 1990 (age 35)	154	48	(Scotland) Hibernian	4 June 2014	Undisclosed	30 June 2016
16	Scott Vernon	CF	(England)	Manchester	13 December 1983 (age 42)	44	3	(Scotland) Aberdeen	18 June 2014	Free	30 June 2016
19	Andy Mangan	CF	(England)	Liverpool	30 August 1986 (age 40)	58	16	Tranmere Rovers	7 January 2016	Free	30 June 2017
23	Tyrone Barnett	CF	(England)	Stevenage	28 October 1985 (age 40)	45	10	Peterborough United	2 February 2015	Undisclosed	30 June 2017
26	Jean-Louis Akpa Akpro	CF	(France)	Toulouse	4 January 1985 (age 41)	95	16	Tranmere Rovers	2 July 2014	Free	30 June 2016
30	Ethan Jones	CF	(England)	Dudley	4 April 1998 (age 28)	1	0	Academy	15 October 2015	Trainee	30 June 2017
32	Kaiman Anderson	CF	(England)	Shrewsbury	Unknown	0	0	Academy	1 July 2015	Trainee	30 June 2016

== Transfers ==
=== Transfers in ===
Date from	Position	Nationality	Name	From	Fee	Contract Length	Ref.
1 July 2015	LM	ENG	Junior Brown	Mansfield Town	Free transfer	1 year	
1 July 2015	CM	NIR	Darren McKnight	Barnsley	Free transfer	1 year + 1 year option	
1 July 2015	CM	ENG	Abu Ogogo	Dagenham & Redbridge	Free transfer	2 years	
1 July 2015	LB	ENG	Mat Sadler	Rotherham United	Free transfer	2 years	
1 July 2015	RB	ENG	Matt Tootle	Crewe Alexandra	Free transfer	2 years	
1 July 2015	RW	ENG	Shaun Whalley	Luton Town	Free transfer	2 years	
1 July 2015	CM	SCO	Martin Woods	Ross County	Free transfer	2 years	
21 August 2015	RB	ENG	Sam Patterson	Free agent	Free transfer	1 year + 1 year option	
14 September 2015	CM	SCO	Ian Black	Rangers	Free transfer	2 years + 1 year option	
16 October 2015	CB	USA	Zak Whitbread	Free Agent	Free transfer	3 months	
24 October 2015	CB	IRE	Anthony Gerrard	Free Agent	Free transfer	Non-contract terms	
7 January 2016	FW	ENG	Andy Mangan	Tranmere Rovers	Undisclosed	18 months	
8 January 2016	CM	ENG	Richie Wellens	Doncaster Rovers	Free transfer	18 months	
6 February 2016	LW	FRA	Elliot Grandin	Free Agent	Free transfer	6 months	

=== Transfers out ===
Date from	Position	Nationality	Name	To	Fee	Ref.
2 June 2015	CF	ENG	Ashley Vincent	Worcester City (Note: Following Vincent's release on 2 June 2015, he later signed for Worcester City on 7 August 2015)	Free transfer	
30 June 2015	RB	ENG	Cameron Gayle	Oxford United (Note: Following Gayles's release on 30 June 2015, he later signed for Oxford United on 6 November 2015)	Contract cancelled	
1 July 2015	CM	ENG	Aaron Wildig	Morecambe (Note: Following Wildig's release on 8 May 2015, he later signed for Morecambe on 6 June 2015.)	Free transfer	
2 July 2015	CF	ENG	Andy Mangan	Tranmere Rovers	Free transfer	
10 August 2015	RW	ENG	Josh Ginnelly	Burnley	Undisclosed	
19 August 2015	CB	ENG	Connor Goldson	Brighton & Hove Albion	Undisclosed	
31 August 2015	CM	SCO	Martin Woods	Ross County	Free transfer	
1 September 2015	DM	ENG	Ryan Woods	Brentford	Undisclosed	
7 January 2016	MF	IRE	Liam Lawrence	Bristol Rovers	Free transfer	
12 January 2016	MF	NIR	Darren McKnight	Morecambe (Note: Following McKnights release on 12 January, he later signed for Morecambe on 19 March 2016.)	Contract cancelled	
13 January 2016	DF	ENG	Sam Patterson	Bradford Park Avenue	Contract cancelled	
21 January 2016	CB	IRE	Anthony Gerrard	Oldham Athletic (Note: Following Gerrard's release on 21 January 2016, he later signed for Oldham Athletic on 26 January 2016)	Contract cancelled	

=== Loans in ===
Date from	Position	Nationality	Name	From	Date until	Ref.
9 July 2015	CF	IRL	Liam McAlinden	Wolverhampton Wanderers	2 January 2016	
1 September 2015	RW	ENG	Larnell Cole	Fulham	30 June 2016	
17 September 2015	MF	ENG	Sullay Kaikai	Crystal Palace	23 December 2015	
6 January 2016	DF	SCO	Jack Grimmer	Fulham	30 June 2016	
8 January 2016	CF	ENG	Kyle Vassell	Peterborough United	30 June 2016	
12 January 2016	MF	ENG	James Wallace	Sheffield United	30 June 2016	
1 March 2016	MF	ENG	Sullay Kaikai	Crystal Palace	3 May 2016	
23 March 2016	DF	SCO	Jack Hendry	Wigan Athletic	30 June 2016	

=== Loans out ===
Date from	Position	Nationality	Name	To	Date until	Ref.
17 July 2015	CF	ENG	Kaiman Anderson	AFC Telford United	21 October 2015	
8 August 2015	MF	ENG	James Caton	Mansfield Town	6 September 2015	
1 September 2015	LB	ENG	Mickey Demetriou	Cambridge United	4 January 2016	
29 October 2015	CB	ENG	Mark Ellis	Carlisle United	2 January 2016	
5 November 2015	MF	ENG	James Caton	(Wales) Wrexham	2 January 2016	
26 November 2015	GK	ENG	Shaun Rowley	Halesowen Town	16 February 2016	
20 December 2015	CF	ENG	Kaiman Anderson	Halesowen Town	23 April 2016	
5 January 2016	CF	IRE	James Collins	Northampton Town	30 June 2016	
7 January 2016	CF	ENG	Tyrone Barnett	Southend United	30 June 2016	
29 January 2016	MF	ENG	James Caton	Lincoln City	30 April 2016	

=== New contracts & contract extensions ===
Date	Position	Nationality	Name	Length	Contracted Until	Ref.
15 May 2015	MF	ENG	Jordan Clark	1 year	30 June 2016	
22 May 2015	FW	ENG	Kaiman Anderson	1 year + 1 year option	30 June 2016	
23 June 2015	GK	ENG	Shaun Rowley	1 year + 1 year option	30 June 2016	
6 August 2015	FW	FRA	Jean-Louis Akpa Akpro	1 year	30 June 2016	
7 August 2015	DF	ENG	Jermaine Grandison	1 year	30 June 2016	
15 October 2015	FW	ENG	Ethan Jones	2 years + 1 year option	30 June 2017	
21 January 2016	DF	USA	Zak Whitbread	6 months	30 June 2016	
8 March 2016	DF	WAL	Dominic Smith	2 years	30 June 2018	

== Competitions ==
=== Pre-season friendlies ===
18 July 2015 Friendly	Shrewsbury Town	2–2	Cardiff City	Shrewsbury
15:15 BST	Akpa Akpro 8' (pen.); Collins 85'	Report	Mason 26'; Pilkington 55'	Stadium: New Meadow; Attendance: 2,446 (872 away fans)

21 July 2015 Friendly	Shrewsbury Town	0–2	Birmingham City	Shrewsbury
19:30 BST		Report	Thomas 2'; Donaldson 14'	Stadium: New Meadow

25 July 2015 Friendly	Shrewsbury Town	1−1	Wolverhampton Wanderers	Shrewsbury
15:00 BST	Barnett 34'	Report	Dicko 10'	Stadium: New Meadow; Attendance: 3,604; Referee: Oliver Lanford

28 July 2015 Friendly	Kidderminster Harriers	0−2	Shrewsbury Town	Kidderminster
19:45 BST		Report	Akpa Akpro 22'; Collins 79'	Stadium: Aggborough; Attendance: 794; Referee: Wayne Barrett

1 August 2015 Friendly	Tranmere Rovers	1–4	Shrewsbury Town	Birkenhead
15:00 BST	Trialist	Report	Barnett; McAlinden; Collins; Akpa Akpro	Stadium: Prenton Park

=== League One ===
==== League table ====
Pos	Team	Pld	W	D	L	GF	GA	GD	Pts	Promotion, qualification or relegation
18	Chesterfield	46	15	8	23	58	70	−12	53	
19	Fleetwood Town	46	12	15	19	52	56	−4	51	
20	Shrewsbury Town	46	13	11	22	58	79	−21	50	
21	Doncaster Rovers (R)	46	11	13	22	48	64	−16	46	Relegation to EFL League Two
22	Blackpool (R)	46	12	10	24	40	63	−23	46	Relegation to EFL League Two

Updated to match(es) played on 1 July 2016. Source: BBC Sport
Rules for classification: 1) Points; 2) Goal difference; 3) Number of goals scored
(R) Relegated

==== Matches ====
8 August 2015 1	Shrewsbury Town	1–2	Millwall	Shrewsbury
15:00 BST	Collins 55'	Report	Morison 59'; Gregory 67' (pen.)	Stadium: New Meadow; Attendance: 6,671; Referee: Charles Breakspear

15 August 2015 2	Bradford City	1–1	Shrewsbury Town	Bradford
15:00 BST	B. Clarke 43'	Report	Barnett 46'	Stadium: Valley Parade; Attendance: 18,039; Referee: Gary Sutton

18 August 2015 3	Shrewsbury Town	1–2	Chesterfield	Shrewsbury
19:45 BST	Sadler 88'	Report	Ebanks-Blake 49'; Morsy 64'	Stadium: New Meadow; Attendance: 4,935; Referee: Mark Heywood

22 August 2015 4	Oldham Athletic	1–1	Shrewsbury Town	Oldham
15:00 BST	Kelly 52' (pen.)	Report	Collins 70'	Stadium: Boundary Park; Attendance: 3,963; Referee: Scott Duncan

29 August 2015 5	Shrewsbury Town	0–1	Burton Albion	Shrewsbury
15:00 BST		Report	Duffy 90'	Stadium: New Meadow; Attendance: 4,780; Referee: Mark Haywood

5 September 2015 6	Barnsley	1–2	Shrewsbury Town	Barnsley
15:00 BST	Winnall 38'	Report	Ellis 6'; Clark 90'	Stadium: Oakwell; Attendance: 8,630; Referee: Stuart Attwell

12 September 2015 7	Southend United	0–1	Shrewsbury Town	Southend-on-Sea
15:00 BST		Report	Knight-Percival 56'	Stadium: Roots Hall; Attendance: 5,212; Referee: Dean Whitestone

19 September 2015 8	Shrewsbury Town	0–1	Crewe Alexandra	Shrewsbury
15:00 BST		Report	King 2'	Stadium: New Meadow; Attendance: 5,481; Referee: Andy Madley

26 September 2015 9	Shrewsbury Town	2–0	Blackpool	Shrewsbury
15:00 BST	Akpa Akpro 73', 76'	Report		Stadium: New Meadow; Attendance: 5,241; Referee: Darren England

29 September 2015 10	Rochdale	3–2	Shrewsbury Town	Rochdale
19:45 BST	Vincenti 4'; Henderson 12' (pen.); Allen 15'	Report	Knight-Percival 35'; Collins 41' (pen.)	Stadium: Spotland Stadium; Attendance: 2,190; Referee: Seb Stockbridge

3 October 2015 11	Coventry City	3–0	Shrewsbury Town	Coventry
15:00 BST	Armstrong 26', 65'; Fortuné 45' (pen.)	Report		Stadium: City of Coventry Stadium; Attendance: 11,445; Referee: Chris Sarginson

10 October 2015 12	Shrewsbury Town	4–2	Colchester United	Shrewsbury
15:00 BST	Barnett 46', 59'; Kaikai 72', 81'	Report	Ellis 36' (o.g.); Eastman 39'	Stadium: New Meadow; Attendance: 4,947; Referee: Lee Swabey

17 October 2015 13	Scunthorpe United	2–1	Shrewsbury Town	Scunthorpe
15:00 BST	Laird 58'; Madden 74' (pen.)	Report	Kaikai 15'	Stadium: Glanford Park; Attendance: 3,558; Referee: Eddie Ilderton

20 October 2015 14	Shrewsbury Town	1–2	Doncaster Rovers	Shrewsbury
19:45 BST	Knight-Percival 27'	Report	Coppinger 14'; Anderson 87'	Stadium: New Meadow; Attendance: 4,735; Referee: Kevin Johnson

24 October 2015 15	Shrewsbury Town	2–0	Bury	Shrewsbury
19:45 BST	Kaikai 28'; Ogogo 73'	Report		Stadium: New Meadow; Attendance: 4,945; Referee: Gavin Ward

31 October 2015 16	Port Vale	2–0	Shrewsbury Town	Burslem
15:00 GMT	Laird 52'; O'Connor 80' (pen.)	Report		Stadium: Vale Park; Attendance: 4,880; Referee: Darren Handley

21 November 2015 17	Wigan Athletic	1–0	Shrewsbury Town	Wigan
15:00 GMT	Revell 36'	Report		Stadium: DW Stadium; Attendance: 8,803; Referee: Darren Deadman

24 November 2015 18	Sheffield United	2–4	Shrewsbury Town	Sheffield
19:45 GMT	Sammon 17'; Hammond 65'	Report	Kaikai 25'; Black 26'; Vernon 35'; Collins 48'	Stadium: Bramall Lane; Attendance: 17,843; Referee: Richard Clark

28 November 2015 19	Shrewsbury Town	2–2	Gillingham	Shrewsbury
15:00 GMT	Oshilaja 31' (o.g.); Collins 70'	Report	McDonald 37'; Jackson 59'	Stadium: New Meadow; Attendance: 4,959; Referee: Kevin Wright

1 December 2015 20	Shrewsbury Town	1–3	Walsall	Shrewsbury
19:45 GMT	Cole 40'	Report	Lalkovič 45'; Downing 80'; Cook 90'	Stadium: New Meadow; Attendance: 6,078; Referee: Peter Bankes

12 December 2015 21	Peterborough United	1–1	Shrewsbury Town	Peterborough
15:00 GMT	Washington 56'	Report	Barnett 79'	Stadium: London Road; Attendance: 5,568; Referee: Graham Horwood

19 December 2015 22	Shrewsbury Town	0–1	Swindon Town	Shrewsbury
15:00 GMT		Report	Ajose 34'	Stadium: New Meadow; Attendance: 5,115; Referee: Jeremy Simpson

26 December 2015 23	Shrewsbury Town	1–1	Fleetwood Town	Shrewsbury
15:00 GMT	Clark 6'	Report	Hunter 86'	Stadium: New Meadow; Attendance: 5,749; Referee: Steve Martin

28 December 2015 24	Crewe Alexandra	1–2	Shrewsbury Town	Crewe
15:00 GMT	Colclough 26'	Report	Cole 11'; Whalley 90'	Stadium: Gresty Road; Attendance: 5,506; Referee: Andy Haines

2 January 2016 25	Chesterfield	7–1	Shrewsbury Town	Chesterfield
15:00 GMT	O'Shea 28', 40' (pen.); Novak 45', 81' (pen.), 89'; Simons 73', 87'	Report	Whitbread 66'	Stadium: Proact Stadium; Attendance: 6,233; Referee: Geoff Eltringham

16 January 2016 26	Shrewsbury Town	0–3	Barnsley	Shrewsbury
15:00 GMT		Report	Winnall 15', 21'; Mawson 72'	Stadium: New Meadow; Attendance: 5,446; Referee: Phil Gibbs

23 January 2016 27	Burton Albion	1–2	Shrewsbury Town	Burton-on-Trent
15:00 GMT	McCrory 18'	Report	Mangan 52'; Whalley 90'	Stadium: Pirelli Stadium; Attendance: 3,870; Referee: Graham Salisbury

26 January 2016 28	Shrewsbury Town	0–1	Oldham Athletic	Shrewsbury
19:45 GMT		Report	Winchester 23'	Stadium: New Meadow; Attendance: 4,057; Referee: Kevin Johnson

2 February 2016 29	Shrewsbury Town	1–2	Southend United	Shrewsbury
19:45 GMT	Mangan 47'	Report	Atkinson 24'; Hendrie 79'	Stadium: New Meadow; Attendance: 4,602; Referee: Chris Sarginson

7 February 2016 30	Fleetwood Town	0–0	Shrewsbury Town	Fleetwood
15:00 GMT		Report		Stadium: Highbury; Attendance: 2,539; Referee: Andrew Madley

13 February 2016 31	Blackpool	2–3	Shrewsbury Town	Blackpool
15:00 GMT	Aldred 36'; Philliskirk 54'	Report	Knight-Percival 5'; Whalley 7'; Mangan 29'	Stadium: Bloomfield Road; Attendance: 6,873; Referee: Carl Boyeson

27 February 2016 32	Colchester United	0–0	Shrewsbury Town	Colchester
15:00 GMT		Report		Stadium: Colchester Community Stadium; Attendance: 3,057; Referee: Andy Woolmer

1 March 2016 33	Shrewsbury Town	2–0	Rochdale	Shrewsbury
19:45 GMT	Whalley 12'; Knight-Percival 45'	Report		Stadium: New Meadow; Attendance: 4,221; Referee: Benjamin Toner

5 March 2016 34	Doncaster Rovers	0–1	Shrewsbury Town	Doncaster
15:00 GMT		Report	Whalley 62'	Stadium: Keepmoat Stadium; Attendance: 5,878; Referee: Phil Gibbs

8 March 2016 35	Shrewsbury Town	2–1	Coventry City	Shrewsbury
19:45 GMT	Kaikai 9'; Whalley 39'	Report	Martin 4'	Stadium: New Meadow; Attendance: 6,023; Referee: Seb Stockbridge

12 March 2016 36	Shrewsbury Town	2–2	Scunthorpe United	Shrewsbury
15:00 GMT	Kaikai 21'; Akpa Akpro 90'	Report	Wootton 69'; Madden 78'	Stadium: New Meadow; Attendance: 5,028; Referee: Trevor Kettle

19 March 2016 37	Bury	2–2	Shrewsbury Town	Bury
15:00 GMT	Soares 30'; P. Clarke 65'	Report	Kaikai 16', 33'	Stadium: Gigg Lane; Attendance: 3,248; Referee: Mark Haywood

25 March 2016 38	Shrewsbury Town	1–1	Port Vale	Shrewsbury
15:00 GMT	Kaikai 73'	Report	Dodds 60'	Stadium: New Meadow; Attendance: 7,019; Referee: Mark Haywood

2 April 2016 39	Shrewsbury Town	1–5	Wigan Athletic	Shrewsbury
15:00 GMT	Kaikai 28'	Report	McAleny 33'; Wildschutt 57'; Pearce 61'; Grigg (pen.), 66', 90'	Stadium: New Meadow; Attendance: 7,010; Referee: Nick Kinseley

9 April 2016 40	Millwall	3–1	Shrewsbury Town	South Bermondsey
15:00 GMT	Thompson 57'; Morison 61'; Gregory (pen.), 90'	Report	Cole 5'	Stadium: The New Den; Attendance: 9,583; Referee: Tim Robinson

16 April 2016 41	Shrewsbury Town	1–1	Bradford City	Shrewsbury
15:00 GMT	Akpa Akpro 84'	Report	Proctor 71'	Stadium: New Meadow; Attendance: 6,247; Referee: Mark Brown

19 April 2016 42	Shrewsbury Town	1–2	Sheffield United	Shrewsbury
19:45 GMT	Ogogo 54'	Report	Sharp 19'; Adams 66'	Stadium: New Meadow; Attendance: 5,064; Referee: David Webb

23 April 2016 43	Gillingham	2–3	Shrewsbury Town	Gillingham, Kent
15:00 GMT	McDonald 45'; Hessenthaler 61'	Report	Kaikai 16'; Mangan 56'; Akpa Akpro 81'	Stadium: Priestfield Stadium; Attendance: 6,906; Referee: Lee Swabey

26 April 2016 44	Walsall	2–1	Shrewsbury Town	Walsall
19:45 GMT	Morris 11'; Henry 44'	Report	Sadler 60'	Stadium: Bescot Stadium; Attendance: 5,339; Referee: David Coote

30 April 2016 45	Shrewsbury Town	3–4	Peterborough United	Shrewsbury
15:00 GMT	Akpa Akpro 74'; Mangan 85'; Grimmer 89'	Report	Baldwin 42'; Angol 46', 69'; Taylor 90'	Stadium: New Meadow; Attendance: 6,019; Referee: Graham Salisbury

8 May 2016 46	Swindon Town	3–0	Shrewsbury Town	Swindon
12:30 GMT	Ajose (pen.), 44', 48'; Young 86'	Report		Stadium: County Ground; Attendance: 8,012; Referee: Lee Collins

=== League Cup ===
On 16 June 2015, the first round draw was made, Shrewsbury Town were drawn away against Blackburn Rovers. In the second round, Shrewsbury Town were drawn against Crystal Palace away.

11 August 2015 First round	Blackburn Rovers	1–2	Shrewsbury Town	Blackburn
19:45 BST	Lawrence 30' (o.g.)	Report	Collins 9'; Barnett 32'	Stadium: Ewood Park; Attendance: 5,280; Referee: Geoff Eltringham

25 August 2015 Second round	Crystal Palace	4–1 (a.e.t.)	Shrewsbury Town	Selhurst
19:45 BST	Gayle 41' (pen.); Murray 95' (pen.); Lee Chung-yong 97'; Zaha 114'	Report	Tootle 9'	Stadium: Selhurst Park; Attendance: 10,978; Referee: Darren Bond

=== FA Cup ===
The draw for the first-round was made on 26 October 2015. Shrewsbury travelled to Gainsborough Trinity.

The ties for the second-round were drawn on 9 November. Shrewsbury were drawn away to Grimsby Town. The draw for the third-round took place on 7 December, before the fixture at Blundell Park was played. Shrewsbury required a replay to secure a tie away at Cardiff City.

The draw for the fourth-round was made on 11 January 2016. Shrewsbury were drawn at home to Sheffield Wednesday.

The draw for the fifth round was made on 31 January 2016. Manchester United were drawn to visit New Meadow.

8 November 2015 First round	Gainsborough Trinity	0–1	Shrewsbury Town	Gainsborough
14:00 BST		Report	Collins 71'	Stadium: The Northolme; Attendance: 2,180; Referee: Darren Bond

7 December 2015 Second round	Grimsby Town	0–0	Shrewsbury Town	Cleethorpes
19:45 BST		Report		Stadium: Blundell Park; Attendance: 3,336; Referee: Seb Stockbridge

15 December 2015 Second round replay	Shrewsbury Town	1–0	Grimsby Town	Shrewsbury
19:45 BST	Ogogo 90'	Report		Stadium: New Meadow; Attendance: 2,730; Referee: Dean Whitestone

10 January 2016 Third round	Cardiff City	0–1	Shrewsbury Town	Cardiff, Wales
18:00 BST		Report	Mangan 62'	Stadium: Cardiff City Stadium; Attendance: 4,782; Referee: Peter Bankes

30 January 2016 Fourth round	Shrewsbury Town	3–2	Sheffield Wednesday	Shrewsbury
15:00 BST	Akpa Akpro 56'; Whalley 87'; Grimmer 90'	Report	McGugan 19', 76'	Stadium: New Meadow; Attendance: 5,699; Referee: Paul Tierney

22 February 2016 Fifth round	Shrewsbury Town	0–3	Manchester United	Shrewsbury
19:45 BST		Report	Smalling 37'; Mata 45'; Lingard 61'	Stadium: New Meadow; Attendance: 9,370; Referee: Bobby Madley

=== Football League Trophy ===
On 8 August 2015, live on Soccer AM the draw for the first round of the Football League Trophy was drawn by Toni Duggan and Alex Scott. Shrewsbury will host Oldham Athletic. Ties for the second round were drawn on 5 September, Shrewsbury travelled to Fleetwood Town.

1 September 2015 First round	Shrewsbury Town	2–0	Oldham Athletic	Shrewsbury
19:45 BST	McAlinden 40'; Barnett 49'	Report		Stadium: New Meadow; Attendance: 1,817; Referee: Steve Martin

6 October 2015 Second round	Fleetwood Town	2–1	Shrewsbury Town	Fleetwood
19:45 BST	Hunter 69'; Grant 90'	Report	Brown 25'	Stadium: Highbury; Attendance: 1,267; Referee: Kevin Wright

=== Shropshire Senior Cup ===
On 22 June 2015, Shrewsbury Town confirmed that their first-team squad would play Market Drayton Town in the semi-final of the Shropshire Senior Cup. AFC Telford United travelled to New Meadow for the final.

11 July 2015 Semi-final	Market Drayton Town	0−6	Shrewsbury Town	Market Drayton
15:00 BST		Report	Barnett 50'; M. Woods 55'; Vernon 68', 69', 81'; Demetriou 85'	Stadium: Greenfields Sports Ground

5 April 2016 Final	Shrewsbury Town	1−1 (3−2 p)	AFC Telford United	Shrewsbury
19:45 BST	Wesolowski 59'	Report	Cofie 47'	Stadium: New Meadow; Attendance: 587; Referee: Kevin Friend
	Penalties
	Vernon (penalty scored); C. Grogan (penalty scored); C. Gallagher (penalty scored); Clark (penalty missed)		(penalty scored) J. Wilson; (penalty scored) Dawson; (penalty missed) Reid; (penalty missed) M. Grogan; (penalty missed) C. McCarthy

== Player statistics ==
=== Squad stats ===
As of match played 8 May 2016.

No.	Pos	Nat	Player	Total		League One		FA Cup		League Cup		League Trophy	
No.	Pos	Nat	Player	Apps	Goals	Apps	Goals	Apps	Goals	Apps	Goals	Apps	Goals
1	GK	(Switzerland) SUI	Jayson Leutwiler	37	0	29	0	4	0	2	0	2	0
2	DF	(England) ENG	Matt Tootle	18	1	16	0	0	0	2	1	0	0
3	DF	(England) ENG	Mat Sadler	30	2	19+5	2	2	0	2	0	1+1	0
4	DF	(United States) USA	Zak Whitbread	27	1	21+1	1	5	0	0	0	0	0
5	DF	(England) ENG	Jermaine Grandison	27	0	19	0	3+1	0	2	0	2	0
6	MF	(Scotland) SCO	Ian Black	36	1	26+4	1	4+1	0	0	0	1	0
7	FW	(England) ENG	Kyle Vassell	13	0	11+2	0	0	0	0	0	0	0
8	MF	(England) ENG	Richie Wellens	12	0	7+5	0	0	0	0	0	0	0
10	MF	(England) ENG	Shaun Whalley	30	7	13+11	6	2+2	1	0+1	0	0+1	0
12	MF	(England) ENG	Junior Brown	40	1	29+2	0	5	0	1+1	0	2	1
14	MF	(Australia) AUS	James Wesolowski	7	0	5	0	0	0	0+1	0	1	0
15	DF	(Scotland) SCO	Jack Grimmer	24	2	21	1	3	1	0	0	0	0
16	FW	(England) ENG	Scott Vernon	18	1	9+4	1	3+2	0	0	0	0	0
17	MF	(England) ENG	Abu Ogogo	50	3	42	2	4	1	2	0	1+1	0
18	DF	(England) ENG	Mickey Demetriou	1	0	1	0	0	0	0	0	0	0
19	FW	(England) ENG	Andy Mangan	22	6	15+4	5	3	1	0	0	0	0
20	DF	(England) ENG	Nathaniel Knight-Percival	41	5	34+1	5	4+1	0	0	0	1	0
21	GK	(England) ENG	Mark Halstead	19	0	16	0	2+1	0	0	0	0	0
22	MF	(England) ENG	Jordan Clark	26	2	13+7	2	3+1	0	0	0	2	0
24	DF	(Scotland) SCO	Jack Hendry	6	0	6	0	0	0	0	0	0	0
25	GK	(England) ENG	Callum Burton	1	0	1	0	0	0	0	0	0	0
26	FW	(France) FRA	Jean-Louis Akpa Akpro	43	7	15+22	6	2+2	1	1+1	0	0	0
27	MF	(England) ENG	James Caton	0	0	0	0	0	0	0	0	0	0
29	MF	(England) ENG	Larnell Cole	34	3	24+5	3	3+1	0	0	0	1	0
30	FW	(England) ENG	Ethan Jones	1	0	0+1	0	0	0	0	0	0	0
31	DF	(Wales) WAL	Dominic Smith	24	0	17+4	0	2+1	0	0	0	0	0
32	FW	(England) ENG	Kaiman Anderson	0	0	0	0	0	0	0	0	0	0
33	GK	(England) ENG	Shaun Rowley	0	0	0	0	0	0	0	0	0	0
38	MF	(England) ENG	James Wallace	8	0	3+4	0	0+1	0	0	0	0	0
88	MF	(France) FRA	Elliot Grandin	0	0	0	0	0	0	0	0	0	0
Players away from the club on loan:
9	FW	(Ireland) EIR	James Collins	28	7	18+5	5	3	1	2	1	0	0
23	FW	(England) ENG	Tyrone Barnett	27	6	11+10	4	1+1	0	1+1	1	2	1
Players who left the club before the season ended:
4	MF	(England) ENG	Ryan Woods	7	0	5	0	0	0	2	0	0	0
6	DF	(England) ENG	Connor Goldson	3	0	2	0	0	0	1	0	0	0
7	MF	(Ireland) EIR	Liam Lawrence	23	0	10+8	0	2	0	2	0	0+1	0
8	MF	(Scotland) SCO	Martin Woods	5	0	4	0	0	0	1	0	0	0
11	MF	(England) ENG	Sullay Kaikai	29	12	23+3	12	2	0	0	0	0+1	0
13	DF	(Ireland) EIR	Anthony Gerrard	15	0	10+1	0	4	0	0	0	0	0
15	DF	(England) ENG	Mark Ellis	12	1	9	1	0	0	1	0	2	0
19	FW	(Ireland) EIR	Liam McAlinden	11	1	2+6	0	0+1	0	0	0	2	1
24	MF	(Northern Ireland) NIR	Darren McKnight	0	0	0	0	0	0	0	0	0	0
28	DF	(England) ENG	Sam Patterson	2	0	0	0	0	0	0	0	2	0

=== Top scorers ===
As of match played 8 May 2016.

Place	Position	Nation	Number	Name	League One	FA Cup	League Cup	FL Trophy	Total
1	MF	(England)	11	Sullay Kaikai	12	0	0	0	12
2	MF	(England)	10	Shaun Whalley	6	1	0	0	7
2	FW	(Republic of Ireland)	9	James Collins	5	1	1	0	7
2	FW	(France)	26	Jean-Louis Akpa Akpro	6	1	0	0	7
3	FW	(England)	19	Andy Mangan	5	1	0	0	6
3	FW	(England)	23	Tyrone Barnett	4	0	1	1	6
4	DF	(England)	20	Nathaniel Knight-Percival	5	0	0	0	5
5	MF	(England)	29	Larnell Cole	3	0	0	0	3
5	MF	(England)	17	Abu Ogogo	2	1	0	0	3
6	DF	(Scotland)	15	Jack Grimmer	1	1	0	0	2
6	DF	(England)	3	Mat Sadler	2	0	0	0	2
6	MF	(England)	22	Jordan Clark	2	0	0	0	2
7	FW	(England)	16	Scott Vernon	1	0	0	0	1
7	DF	(United States)	4	Zak Whitbread	1	0	0	0	1
7	MF	(Scotland)	6	Ian Black	1	0	0	0	1
7	MF	(England)	12	Junior Brown	0	0	0	1	1
7	DF	(England)	2	Matt Tootle	0	0	1	0	1
7	FW	(Republic of Ireland)	19	Liam McAlinden	0	0	0	1	1
7	DF	(England)	15	Mark Ellis	1	0	0	0	1
7	−	−	−	Own-goals	1	0	0	0	1

Players in italics left the club before the season ended

=== Disciplinary record ===
As of match played 8 May 2016.

No.	Nat.	Pos.	Name	League Two		FA Cup		EFL Cup		EFL Trophy		Total	
No.	Nat.	Pos.	Name	Booked	Sent off (straight red)	Booked	Sent off (straight red)	Booked	Sent off (straight red)	Booked	Sent off (straight red)	Booked	Sent off (straight red)
1	SUI	GK	Jayson Leutwiler	2	0	0	0	1	0	0	0	3	0
2	ENG	DF	Matt Tootle	3	0	0	0	1	0	0	0	4	0
3	ENG	DF	Mat Sadler	3	0	0	0	1	0	1	0	5	0
4	ENG	MF	Ryan Woods	1	0	0	0	1	0	0	0	2	0
4	USA	DF	Zak Whitbread	3	1	1	0	0	0	0	0	4	1
5	ENG	DF	Jermaine Grandison	1	0	0	0	0	0	0	0	1	0
6	ENG	DF	Connor Goldson	1	0	0	0	0	0	0	0	1	0
6	ENG	MF	Ian Black	11	2	1	0	0	0	1	0	13	2
7	IRE	MF	Liam Lawrence	1	0	1	0	0	0	0	0	2	0
7	IRE	FW	Kyle Vassell	1	0	0	0	0	0	0	0	1	0
8	ENG	MF	Richie Wellens	1	0	0	0	0	0	0	0	1	0
9	IRE	FW	James Collins	3	0	0	0	0	0	0	0	3	0
10	ENG	MF	Shaun Whalley	2	0	0	0	0	0	0	0	2	0
12	ENG	MF	Junior Brown	8	1	1	0	0	0	0	0	9	1
13	ENG	DF	Anthony Gerrard	2	0	1	0	0	0	0	0	3	0
14	AUS	MF	James Wesolowski	2	0	0	0	0	0	0	0	2	0
15	SCO	DF	Jack Grimmer	4	0	2	0	0	0	0	0	6	0
16	ENG	FW	Scott Vernon	2	0	0	0	0	0	0	0	2	0
17	ENG	MF	Abu Ogogo	6	0	0	0	0	0	0	0	6	0
18	ENG	DF	Mickey Demetriou	1	0	0	0	0	0	0	0	1	0
19	IRE	FW	Liam McAlinden	1	0	0	0	0	0	0	0	1	0
20	ENG	DF	Nathaniel Knight-Percival	8	1	2	0	0	0	0	0	10	1
21	ENG	GK	Mark Halstead	1	1	0	0	0	0	0	0	1	1
22	ENG	MF	Jordan Clark	2	0	0	0	0	0	0	0	2	0
23	ENG	FW	Tyrone Barnett	2	0	0	0	0	0	0	0	2	0
24	ENG	DF	Jack Hendry	2	0	0	0	0	0	0	0	2	0
26	FRA	FW	Jean-Louis Akpa Akpro	5	0	1	0	0	0	0	0	6	0
29	ENG	MF	Larnell Cole	2	0	0	0	0	0	0	0	2	0
31	WAL	DF	Dominic Smith	2	0	0	0	0	0	0	0	2	0
38	ENG	MF	James Wallace	1	0	0	0	0	0	0	0	1	0

Players in italics left the club before the season ended
