= Nathaniel Knight-Percival =

English footballer

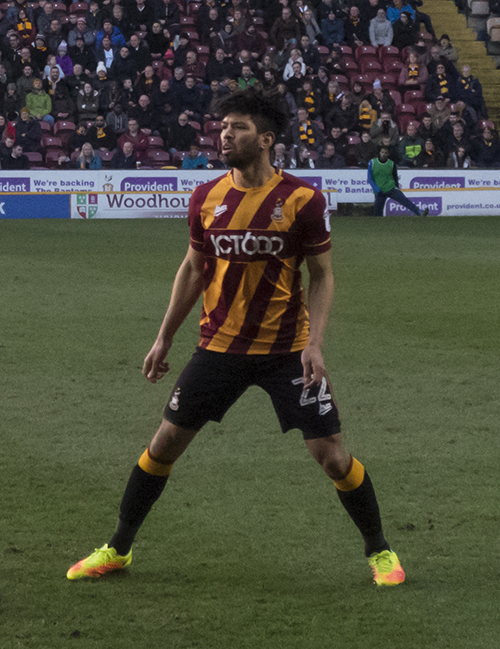
- Knight-Percival playing for Bradford City in 2016

Personal information
- Full name: Nathaniel Lawrence Knight-Percival
- Date of birth: 31 March 1987 (age 39)
- Place of birth: Enfield, England
- Height: 1.86 m (6 ft 1 in)
- Position: Defender

Youth career
- Histon

Senior career*
Years	Team	Apps	(Gls)
2004–2010	Histon	186	(29)
2010–2012	Wrexham	77	(8)
2012–2014	Peterborough United	46	(1)
2014–2016	Shrewsbury Town	63	(6)
2016–2019	Bradford City	118	(6)
2019–2020	Carlisle United	15	(0)
2020–2021	Morecambe	31	(0)
2021–2022	Tranmere Rovers	16	(0)
2022–2024	Kidderminster Harriers	39	(1)
2024	→ Tamworth (loan)	5	(2)
2024–2025	Southport	37	(1)
2025–	Bamber Bridge		

International career
2009	England C	1	(0)
- * Club domestic league appearances and goals as of 17:10, 16 May 2025 (UTC)

Nathaniel Lawrence Knight-Percival (born 31 March 1987) is an English professional footballer who currently plays as a defender for Bamber Bridge.

He started his career at Histon, progressing through the youth ranks and eventually becoming a regular in the first team. He won two promotions during his six years with Histon, helping them to the Southern League Premier Division title in 2004–05 and the Conference South title in 2006–07. He was sold to Conference Premier rivals Wrexham in April 2010; in doing so he resigned his position in a car factory to become a full-time professional footballer. He played in two unsuccessful play-off campaigns and was named in the 2011–12 Conference Premier Team of the Year. He moved into the Football League by signing for Peterborough United in May 2012.

He overcame the three division gap to establish himself in the first-team at Peterborough, though the club were relegated out of the Championship at the end of the 2012–13 season. He won the Football League Trophy with Peterborough in 2014. He joined Shrewsbury Town on a free transfer in May 2014 and was promoted out of League Two at the end of the 2014–15 season. He was appointed as club captain in January 2016, though took a free transfer to Bradford City in July 2016. He made 135 competitive appearances for Bradford over the course of three seasons, though was released following relegation out of League One in May 2019. He spent the 2019–20 season with Carlisle United.

== Club career ==
=== Histon ===
Knight-Percival was born in Enfield, London. Having already spent his youth career at Histon, he debuted for the first team during the 2004–05 season, in which he made 12 appearances in all competitions, five of which came in the league. Histon enjoyed a successful 2004–05 campaign and were crowned champions of the Southern League Premier Division, resulting in promotion to the Conference South. He featured 42 times in the 2005–06 campaign, helping the "Stutes" to reach the play-offs, though was an unused substitute in the play-off final defeat to St Albans City. Histon then went on to dominate the division in the 2006–07 season, racking up 94 points to secure the Conference South title, with Knight-Percival contributing five goals from 28 games.

He scored nine goals in 49 appearances in the 2007–08 season, as Histon finished two places outside the play-off zone. Histon qualified for the FA Cup in 2008–09, knocking out League One sides Swindon Town and Leeds United in the opening two rounds with two 1–0 wins, before finally losing 2–1 to Swansea City. Manager Steve Fallon said that the win over Leeds "was a huge day for the whole village" and ten years on Knight-Percival recalled it as being "the best day of my career". He went on to score ten goals from 50 matches as Histon posted a third-place finish in the Conference Premier, though they were beaten 2–1 on aggregate by Torquay United in the play-off semi-finals. The 2009–10 season ended with a disappointing 18th-place finish, though Knight-Percival added another seven goals from 45 games to leave his total tally at Bridge Road at 226 appearances and 37 goals.

=== Wrexham ===
On 21 April 2010, Knight-Percival signed a pre-contract agreement at Wrexham for an undisclosed fee – believed to be around £5,000. He had worked in a car factory before joining the "Dragons", and had been keen to become a full-time professional footballer. Manager Dean Saunders said his versatility was a key attraction with Wrexham looking to reduce their playing budget. Knight-Percival scored four goals in 34 games in 2010–11, helping Wrexham to the play-off semi-finals, where they lost out 5–1 on aggregate to Luton Town after losing the first leg at the Racecourse Ground 3–0.

He was converted to play at centre-back by Andy Morrell during the 2011–12 season. On 3 December, Wrexham knocked League One side Brentford out of the second round of the FA Cup; Wrexham won 1–0 and Knight-Percival came close to scoring with an overhead kick. They took Championship club Brighton & Hove Albion to a replay in the next round, before losing on penalties. Wrexham totalled 98 points in the league but had to settle for a place in the play-offs, and were once again beaten by Luton Town, losing 3–2 on aggregate. He was named on that season's Conference Premier Team of the Year, alongside teammate Mark Creighton.

=== Peterborough United ===
Knight-Percival moved into the Football League when he signed a two-year deal with Peterborough United in May 2012, having already signed a pre-contract in January. In regards to the transfer, Knight-Percival said: "It's a massive step-up for me, but it's one I feel ready to take. Peterborough have a habit of finding players in the lower divisions who can perform much higher and hopefully I will be one of those." He made his full debut for the "Posh" against Reading in the second round of the 2012–13 League Cup; Reading won the match 3–2, and Knight-Percival scored an own goal in the 38th-minute after misjudging a cross from Danny Guthrie. He made his league debut on 18 September, starting in a 2–1 defeat to Bristol City at the London Road Stadium. He made 33 appearances throughout the 2012–13 season, which ended in relegation out of the Championship with defeat to Crystal Palace on the final day.

His first game of the 2013–14 season was another second round League Cup tie against Reading, which Peterborough won 6–0. On 23 September, he received a red card against Milton Keynes Dons in the 7th-minute, following an elbow on Patrick Bamford; Peterborough were reduced to nine men when Mark Little was also sent off in the 76th-minute, but they managed to hold on to win 2–1. On 11 January, Knight-Percival scored his first goal for Peterborough in a 2–1 loss at Swindon Town. He made 23 appearances in all competitions during the season, including in Peterborough's 3–1 win over Chesterfield in the final of the Football League Trophy at Wembley. Just two days after Leyton Orient defeated Peterborough in the second leg of the League One play-off semi-final, Knight-Percival was among five players released by manager Darren Ferguson in May 2014.

=== Shrewsbury Town ===
Knight-Percival joined Shrewsbury Town on a free transfer on 22 May 2014; the "Shrews" had just been relegated into League Two and new manager Micky Mellon signed a further 14 new players to reinvigorate the club. He made his debut on the opening day of the 2014–15 season, playing left-back in a 2–2 draw away at AFC Wimbledon, and scored his first goal at the New Meadow in a 3–1 victory over Cheltenham Town on 11 October. He was part of a strong back three defence, along with Jermaine Grandison and Connor Goldson, who were both athletic ball-playing centre-backs. However he was sent off for two bookings in a goalless draw away to Luton Town on 8 January, and the following month suffered a cruciate knee ligament injury which ruled him out for the rest of the season. Shrewsbury continued to pick up results in his absence though, and secured automatic promotion back into League One with a second-place finish.

He returned to the squad ahead of schedule after the sale of Goldson to Brighton & Hove Albion, although he only featured sparingly as he concluded his rehabilitation. After making his comeback in a Football League Trophy first-round match against Oldham Athletic, he scored the winning goal in a 1–0 victory over Southend United in September and picked up the nickname 'Rolls-Royce' for his assured performances. After the departures of Liam Lawrence and James Collins in the January 2016 transfer window, he became Shrewsbury captain. Town finished one place above the relegation zone and reached the fifth round of the FA Cup, overcoming Championship opposition in Cardiff City and Sheffield Wednesday, before bowing out of the competition with a 3–0 home defeat to Premier League giants Manchester United.

=== Bradford City ===
Knight-Percival joined Bradford City on a free transfer on 1 July 2016, after rejecting the offer of a new contract at Shrewsbury. Initially seen as a squad player, his excellent form at the start of the 2016–17 season made him a "prominent" and "influential" player in the "Bantams" promotion push, partnering with Romain Vincelot at centre-back. Bradford qualified for the play-offs with a fifth-place finish, and Knight-Percival played in the play-off final defeat to Millwall on 20 May.

He said that manager Stuart McCall's positivity in pre-season removed the disappointment of losing the play-off final. He scored his first goal for Bradford on 5 August in a 2–1 win over Blackpool. However he started the new season in poor form after being played on the right side of a centre-back two with Matthew Kilgallon. He soon got used to the position however and put in some good performances, despite occasionally struggling with physical players such as Rochdale's Calvin Andrew. He made a total of 46 appearances as Bradford ended the 2017–18 season with an 11th-place finish under the stewardship of Simon Grayson.

New manager David Hopkin implemented a 5–3–2 system for his first match in charge on 8 September 2018, and Knight-Percival was reported to have "had his best game for months". He went on to feature 41 times in the 2018–19 season, scoring three goals and picking up two red cards. In May 2019, following Bradford City's relegation to League Two, new manager Gary Bowyer named as Knight-Percival as of 11 players to be released upon the expiry of their contracts at Valley Parade.

=== Carlisle United ===
On 4 July 2019, it was announced that Knight-Percival had signed for League Two side Carlisle United on a one-year deal. Manager Steven Pressley said that "he's a player we've been pursuing for some time so it's been a slow burner". However Knight-Percival failed to build a good understanding with Byron Webster and featured just twice after Chris Beech replaced Pressley as "Blues" boss in November. He was one of ten players released at Brunton Park in May 2020.

=== Morecambe ===
On 3 August he signed for League Two club Morecambe on a one-year deal.

=== Tranmere Rovers ===
In June 2021, Knight-Percival signed for Tranmere Rovers on a one-year contract. He was released at the end of the 2021–22 season.

=== Kidderminster Harriers ===
On 8 July 2022, Knight-Percival dropped down to the National League North to join Kidderminster Harriers.

=== Tamworth ===
On 27 March 2024, Knight-Percival joined National League North leaders Tamworth on loan for the remainder of the season.

=== Southport ===
On 30 May 2024, Knight-Percival signed for Southport, joining officially on 1 July as the first summer signing for Jim Bentley. He departed the club upon the expiration of his contract at the end of the 2024–25 season.

== International career ==
Knight-Percival was called up by Paul Fairclough for the England C for their International Challenge Trophy fixture against Finland U23 in Helsinki on 14 November 2007. He won his one and only C team cap against Hungary U23 on 15 September 2009; the match finished as a 1–1 draw.

== Style of play ==
Knight-Percival spent the early part of his career as a winger, before converted into a left-sided central defender at Wrexham.

== Career statistics ==
As of 15 August 2026

Appearances and goals by club, season and competition
Club	Season	League			FA Cup		League Cup		Other (Note: Includes appearances in the Football League/EFL Trophy, League and Conference play-offs, FA Trophy, Conference League Cup and Cambridgeshire Invitation Cup.)		Total	
Club	Season	Division	Apps	Goals	Apps	Goals	Apps	Goals	Apps	Goals	Apps	Goals
Histon	2004–05	SFL Premier Division	5	0	0	0	0	0	7	3	12	3
Histon	2005–06	Conference South	32	2	6	1	0	0	4	0	42	3
Histon	2006–07	Conference South	21	3	1	0	0	0	6	2	28	5
Histon	2007–08	Conference Premier	44	8	2	1	0	0	3	0	49	9
Histon	2008–09	Conference Premier	41	9	5	0	0	0	4	1	50	10
Histon	2009–10	Conference Premier	43	7	1	0	0	0	1	0	45	7
Histon	Total		186	29	15	2	0	0	25	6	226	37
Wrexham	2010–11	Conference Premier	32	4	0	0	0	0	2	0	34	4
Wrexham	2011–12	Conference Premier	45	4	5	0	0	0	2	0	52	4
Wrexham	Total		77	8	5	0	0	0	4	0	86	8
Peterborough United	2012–13	Championship	31	0	1	0	1	0	0	0	33	0
Peterborough United	2013–14	League One	15	1	2	0	1	0	5	0	23	1
Peterborough United	Total		46	1	3	0	2	0	5	0	56	1
Shrewsbury Town	2014–15	League Two	28	1	3	0	4	0	1	0	36	1
Shrewsbury Town	2015–16	League One	35	5	5	0	0	0	1	0	41	5
Shrewsbury Town	Total		63	6	8	0	4	0	2	0	77	6
Bradford City	2016–17	League One	42	0	0	0	1	0	5	0	48	0
Bradford City	2017–18	League One	41	4	2	1	1	0	2	0	46	5
Bradford City	2018–19	League One	35	2	3	1	0	0	3	0	41	3
Bradford City	Total		118	6	5	2	2	0	10	0	135	8
Carlisle United	2019–20	League Two	15	0	1	0	2	0	1	0	19	0
Morecambe	2020–21	League Two	31	0	2	0	1	0	6 (Note: 3 appearances in EFL Trophy and three appearances and one goal in EFL League Two play-offs)	1	40	1
Tranmere Rovers	2021–22	League Two	16	0	2	0	0	0	3 (Note: Appearance(s) in EFL Trophy)	0	21	0
Kidderminster Harriers	2022–23	National League North	26	1	1	0	—		0	0	27	1
Kidderminster Harriers	2023–24	National League	13	0	0	0	—		0	0	13	0
Kidderminster Harriers	Total		39	1	1	0	0	0	0	0	40	1
Southport	2024-25	National League North	37	1	0	0	0	0	4	0	41	1
Bamber Bridge	2025-26	Northern Premier League	37	2	0	0	0	0	0	0	37	2
	2026-27	Northern Premier League	3	0	0	0	0	0	0	0	3	0
Career total			668	54	42	4	11	0	60	7	781	65

== Honours ==
Histon

- Conference South: 2006–07
- Southern League Premier Division: 2004–05

Peterborough United

- Football League Trophy: 2013–14

Shrewsbury Town

- Football League Two second-place promotion: 2014–15

Morecambe

- EFL League Two play-offs: 2021

Kidderminster Harriers

- National League North play-offs: 2023

Individual

- Conference Premier Team of the Year: 2011–12
