= Rhys Sharpe =

Northern Irish footballer (born 1994)

Personal information
- Full name: Rhys Sharpe
- Date of birth: 17 October 1994 (age 32)
- Place of birth: Nottingham, England
- Height: 5 ft 11 in (1.80 m)
- Position: Defender

Team information
- Current team: Stamford

Youth career
- –2012: Derby County

Senior career*
Years	Team	Apps	(Gls)
2012–2015	Derby County	0	(0)
2012	→ Mickleover Sports (loan)		
2015	→ Shrewsbury Town (loan)	3	(0)
2015–2016	Notts County	5	(0)
2016–2017	Swindon Town	0	(0)
2017–2018	Matlock Town	33	(2)
2018–2019	Tamworth	19	(0)
2019–2020	Nuneaton Borough	32	(0)
2020–2021	Stratford Town	2	(0)
2020–2024	Kettering Town	108	(3)
2025	Basford United	?	(?)
2025–	Stamford	0	(0)

International career^{‡}
2013–2015	Northern Ireland U21	7	(0)
- * Club domestic league appearances and goals as of 18:47, 1 July 2025 (UTC) ‡ National team caps and goals as of 12:00, 29 December 2019 (UTC)

Rhys Sharpe (born 17 October 1994) is a Northern Irish footballer who plays as a defender for Southern League Premier Division Central club Stamford.

== Playing career ==
=== Derby County ===
Born in Nottingham, Sharpe was a Derby County youth graduate and in April 2013, Sharpe signed his first professional contract on a two-year after he completed his two-year scholarship programmes. On 13 March 2015 he was loaned to League Two side Shrewsbury Town on a month's youth loan. Four days later Sharpe made his professional debut, starting in a 4–1 away win against Morecambe, with the loan later extended until the end of the season.

At the end of the season, Sharpe returned to his parent club, and was released.

=== Notts County ===
He joined Notts County on a two-year contract on 2 June 2015. He was released by mutual consent on 12 August 2016.

=== Swindon Town ===
On 6 December 2016, Sharpe joined League One side Swindon Town on a short-term deal. After appearing once in the EFL Trophy, Sharpe was released at the end of his contract in January 2017.

=== Matlock Town ===
On 9 March 2017, Sharpe joined Northern Premier League Premier Division side Matlock Town.

=== Tamworth ===
Sharpe signed for National League North side Tamworth on 2 February 2018, having spent a period on trial with the club at the beginning if the season, but an injury scuppered any chance of the player earning a contract. Following some impressive performances, Sharpe signed an extension to his contract on 1 March 2018.

=== Nuneaton Borough ===
Sharpe signed for National League North side Nuneaton Borough on 4 January 2019, on a six-month deal.

=== Stratford Town ===
Sharpe started the 2020/21 season playing for Southern League Premier Central side Stratford Town however due to lockdown regulations put in place because of COVID-19 the league program was halted after 8 games in October 2020 and the season declared void.

=== Kettering Town ===
With Stratford Town's season terminated, Sharpe signed for Kettering Town on 27 November 2020 making his debut the following day away at Hereford FC.

=== Basford United ===
In January 2025, Sharpe joined Northern Premier League Premier Division side Basford United.

== International career ==
=== Northern Ireland U21 ===
Sharpe was called up by Northern Ireland national under-20 football team in July 2013, and made his debut against Denmark, before making two more appearances against USA and Mexico.

In October 2013, Sharpe was called by Northern Ireland U21. Sharpe made his national team debut, playing 90 minutes, in a 1–0 loss against Belgium U21.

== Career statistics ==
As of match played 29 December 2019.

Appearances and goals by club, season and competition
Club	Season	League			FA Cup		League Cup		Other		Total	
Club	Season	Division	Apps	Goals	Apps	Goals	Apps	Goals	Apps	Goals	Apps	Goals
Shrewsbury Town (loan)	2014–15	League Two	3	0	0	0	0	0	0	0	3	0
Notts County	2015–16	League Two	5	0	0	0	0	0	0	0	5	0
Swindon Town	2016–17	League One	0	0	0	0	0	0	1	0	1	0
Matlock Town	2016–17	Northern Premier League Premier Division	10	1	—		—		—		10	1
Matlock Town	2017–18	Northern Premier League Premier Division	23	1	1	0	—		2	0	26	1
Matlock Town	Total		33	2	1	0	—		2	0	36	2
Tamworth	2017–18	National League North	13	0	—		—		—		13	0
Tamworth	2018–19	Southern League Central Division	6	0	0	0	—		—		6	0
Tamworth	Total		19	0	0	0	—		0	0	19	0
Nuneaton Borough	2018–19	National League North	18	0	—		—		—		18	0
Nuneaton Borough	2019–20	Southern League Central Division	14	0	1	0	—		—		15	0
Nuneaton Borough	Total		32	0	1	0	—		0	0	33	0
Career total			92	2	2	0	0	0	3	0	97	2
