= Larnell Cole =

English footballer

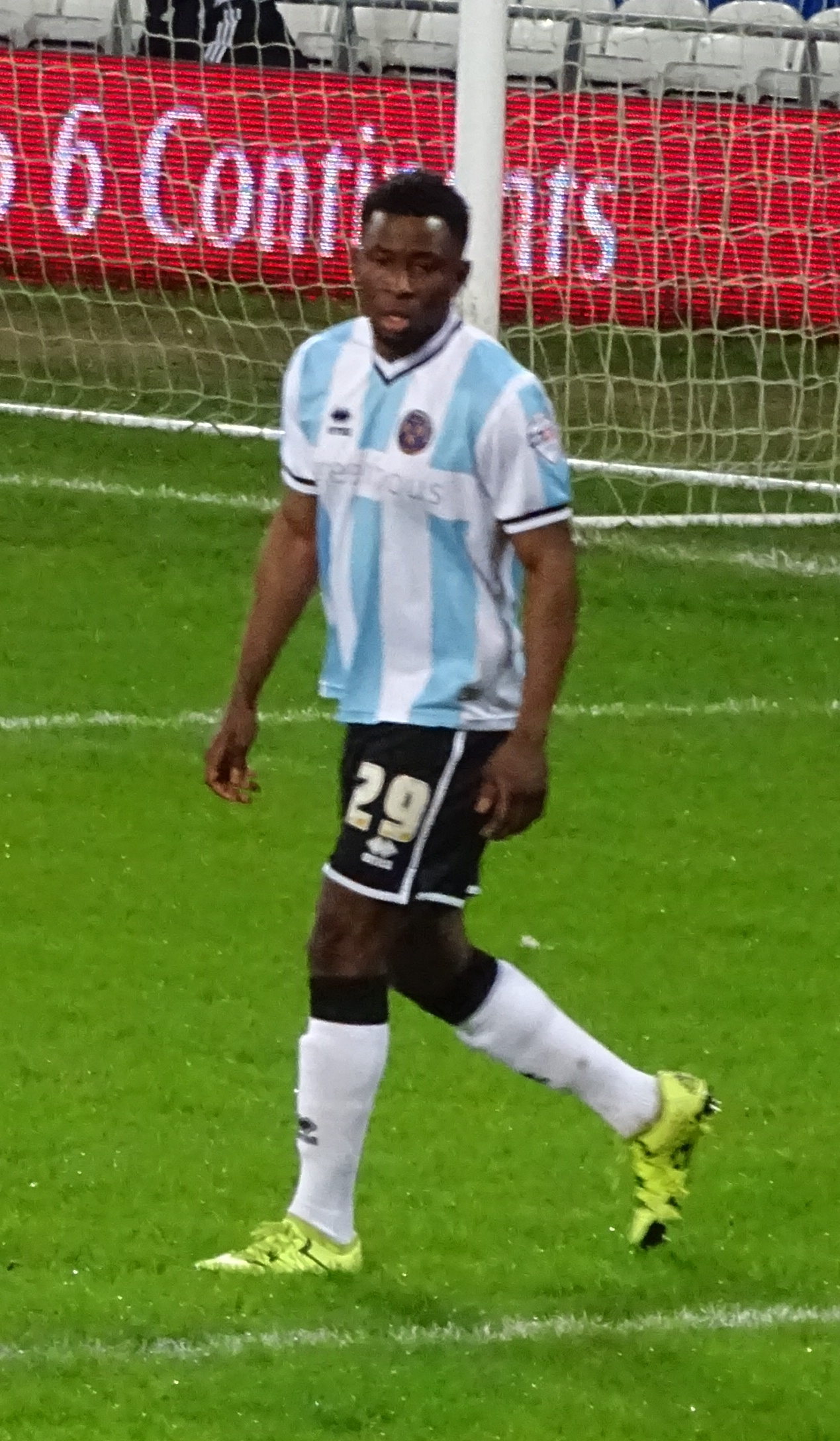
- Cole playing for Shrewsbury Town in 2016

Personal information
- Full name: Larnell James Cole
- Date of birth: 9 March 1993 (age 33)
- Place of birth: Manchester, England
- Position: Midfielder

Youth career
- 2009–2011: Manchester United

Senior career*
Years	Team	Apps	(Gls)
2011–2014	Manchester United	0	(0)
2014–2017	Fulham	1	(0)
2014	→ Milton Keynes Dons (loan)	3	(0)
2015–2016	→ Shrewsbury Town (loan)	29	(3)
2016–2017	→ Inverness Caledonian Thistle (loan)	21	(1)
2017–2019	Tranmere Rovers	13	(2)
2020	FC United of Manchester	1	(0)
2020	Radcliffe Borough	5	(2)
2022–2023	Flint Town United	17	(2)
2023	Warrington Town		

International career^{‡}
2011	England U19	4	(0)
2013	England U20	2	(0)
- * Club domestic league appearances and goals as of 17 February 2023 ‡ National team caps and goals as of 09:30, 1 April 2019 (UTC)

Larnell James Cole (born 9 March 1993) is an English professional footballer who plays as a midfielder. Born in Manchester, Cole began his career with Manchester United, before joining Fulham in January 2014. He had loan spells at Milton Keynes Dons, Shrewsbury Town and Inverness Caledonian Thistle before moving to Tranmere Rovers in 2017.

== Club career ==
=== Manchester United ===
Cole arrived as a schoolboy at Manchester United, before coming through the academy. A notable game came in 2011, when he scored a hat-trick against rivals Manchester City in a 6–1 victory in the Premier Academy League. He then went on to make an impact in the club's run to the FA Youth Cup final, scoring a penalty and setting up teammate Ravel Morrison on the way to a 3–2 comeback against Liverpool in the quarter-final.

Cole made his only senior appearance for Manchester United in the League Cup on 20 September 2011, coming as a substitute for Federico Macheda in the 77th minute of a 3–0 third round victory over rivals Leeds United at Elland Road.

On 14 May 2013, Cole scored a hat-trick, including two penalties, against rivals Liverpool in the semi-final of the Under-21 Premier League as Manchester United won 3–0. Six days later, he scored two goals against Tottenham Hotspur in the Under-21 final at Old Trafford, as Manchester United won 3–2.

=== Fulham ===
On 31 January 2014, Cole joined fellow Premier League team Fulham for an undisclosed fee, along with Manchester United teammate Ryan Tunnicliffe, joining up with former Manchester United coach René Meulensteen. He made his debut on 9 February in a 2–2 draw against his former club at Old Trafford, coming on as an 80th-minute substitute for William Kvist.

Following Meulensteen's sacking as Fulham manager, Cole and Tunnicliffe were deemed surplus to requirements by Meulensteen's replacement, Felix Magath. On 25 February 2014, Cole joined League One side Milton Keynes Dons on loan until the end of the 2013–14 season. He made three appearances for the Dons, while his parent club ended the season with relegation to the Championship. Cole did not play a single competitive game in 2014–15.

On 1 September 2015, the last day of the 2015 summer transfer window, Cole returned to League One, with promoted club Shrewsbury Town, on loan until January 2016. He made his debut four days later, replacing the injured James Wesolowski in the 16th minute of an eventual 2–1 win at Barnsley for the team's first league win of the season. He then provided two assists for Jean-Louis Akpa Akpro in a 2–0 victory over Blackpool on 26 September for Shrewsbury's first home win of the season. His first senior goal came in a 3–1 defeat to Walsall at the New Meadow on 1 December. He later extended his loan deal until the end of the season, making a total of 34 appearances in all competitions, scoring 3 goals.

On 31 August 2016, Cole signed for Scottish Premiership club Inverness Caledonian Thistle on a loan deal until January 2017. He scored his first goal for the club in a 1–1 draw with Hamilton Academical on 10 December 2016. In January 2017, the loan deal was extended until the end of the 2016–17 season.

=== Tranmere Rovers ===
On 27 October 2017, Cole signed for National League club Tranmere Rovers on a deal until January 2018. Cole made his Tranmere debut the very next day, coming on as a substitute and scoring in a 4–2 home win against Halifax Town. Four weeks later, Cole doubled his Rovers goals tally, scoring the opening goal in a 2–2 draw away to Macclesfield Town on 21 November.

Cole extended his contract with Tranmere at the end of the 2017–18 season, but after just over a year with the club, he was released in January 2019.

=== F.C. United of Manchester ===
Cole joined FC United of Manchester in February 2020.

=== Flint Town United ===
In June 2022 he joined Cymru Premier side Flint Town United. He made his league debut for the club on 13 August.

=== Warrington Town ===
In February 2023, Cole signed for Northern Premier League Premier Division club Warrington Town. He was released by the club at the end of the season.

== International career ==
Cole was called up for the England under-19 friendly against the Netherlands in August 2011 and went on to make his debut as a substitute in the 0–0 draw on 1 September 2011. On 28 May 2013, he was named in manager Peter Taylor's 21-man squad for the 2013 FIFA U-20 World Cup. He made his debut on 16 June, in a 3–0 win in a warm-up game against Uruguay.

== Career statistics ==
As of match played 13 May 2017

Appearances and goals by club, season and competition
Club	Season	League			National Cup		League Cup		Europe		Other		Total	
Club	Season	Division	Apps	Goals	Apps	Goals	Apps	Goals	Apps	Goals	Apps	Goals	Apps	Goals
Manchester United	2011–12	Premier League	0	0	0	0	1	0	0	0	0	0	1	0
Manchester United	2012–13	Premier League	0	0	0	0	0	0	0	0	–		0	0
Manchester United	2013–14	Premier League	0	0	0	0	0	0	0	0	0	0	0	0
Manchester United	Total		0	0	0	0	1	0	0	0	0	0	1	0
Fulham	2013–14	Premier League	1	0	0	0	0	0	–		–		1	0
Fulham	2014–15	Championship	0	0	0	0	0	0	–		–		0	0
Fulham	2015–16	Championship	0	0	0	0	0	0	–		–		0	0
Fulham	2016–17	Championship	0	0	0	0	0	0	–		–		0	0
Fulham	Total		1	0	0	0	0	0	–		–		1	0
Milton Keynes Dons (loan)	2013–14	League One	3	0	0	0	0	0	–		0	0	3	0
Shrewsbury Town (loan)	2015–16	League One	29	3	4	0	0	0	–		1 (Note: Appearance in Football League Trophy)	0	34	3
Inverness Caledonian Thistle (loan)	2016–17	Scottish Premiership	21	1	2	1	0	0	−		–		23	2
Career total			54	4	6	1	1	0	0	0	1	0	62	5
