= 2014–15 Shrewsbury Town F.C. season =

Shrewsbury Town F.C.
2014–2015 season
- Chairman: Roland Wycherley
- Manager: Micky Mellon
- Ground: New Meadow
- League Two: 2nd (promoted)
- FA Cup: Second round
- League Cup: Fourth round
- League Trophy: First round
- Shropshire Senior Cup: Winners
- Top goalscorer: League: James Collins (15); All: James Collins (17)
- Highest home attendance: 8,963 v Plymouth Argyle; 2 May 2015(League); 10,210 v Chelsea, League Cup; 28 October 2014(All competitions)
- Lowest home attendance: 3,833 v Carlisle United; 16 September 2014
- Average home league attendance: 5,343
Home colours	Away colours	Third colours

The 2014−15 season was Shrewsbury's first season back in League Two after being relegated in the 2013−14 season. They won promotion back to League One at the first attempt, following a 1–0 win away at Cheltenham Town on 25 April 2015.

They also participated in the League Cup, the Football League Trophy and the FA Cup.

A side consisting of youth and reserve team players also contested, and subsequently won the Shropshire Senior Cup.

== Players ==
=== First team squad information ===
As of match played 2 May 2015

No.	Name	Position	Nationality	Place of birth	Date of birth (age)	Club caps (all comps)	Club goals (all comps)	Signed from	Date signed	Fee	Contract End
Goalkeepers
1	Jayson Leutwiler	GK	(Switzerland)	Basel	25 April 1989 (age 37)	54	0	Middlesbrough	11 June 2014	Free	2016
21	Mark Halstead	GK	(England)	Blackpool	17 September 1990 (age 35)	2	0	Blackpool	5 June 2014	Free	2016
36	Callum Burton	GK	(England)	Newport, Shropshire	15 August 1996 (age 30)	0	0	Academy	24 February 2014	Trainee	2016
Defenders
2	Jermaine Grandison	CB/RB	(England)	Birmingham	15 December 1990 (age 35)	147	5	Free Agent	3 December 2013	Free	2015
3	Mickey Demetriou	LB	(England)	Durrington	12 March 1990 (age 36)	49	3	Kidderminster Harriers	2 June 2014	Free	2016
5	Mark Ellis	CB	(England)	Kingsbridge	30 September 1988 (age 37)	35	3	Crewe Alexandra	30 May 2014	Free	2016
6	Connor Goldson	CB	(England)	York	18 December 1992 (age 33)	117	8	Academy	12 May 2010	Trainee	2016
12	Cameron Gayle	RB/LB/CB	(England)	Birmingham	22 November 1992 (age 33)	54	1	West Bromwich Albion	10 July 2014	Free	2016
20	Nathaniel Knight-Percival	CB	(England)	Enfield	31 March 1987 (age 39)	36	1	Peterborough United	22 May 2014	Free	2016
29	Rhys Sharpe	LB/CB	(Northern Ireland)	(England) Nottingham	17 October 1994 (age 31)	3	0	Derby County	13 March 2015	Loan	11 April 2015
31	Dominic Smith	CB	(Wales)	Telford	9 February 1996 (age 30)	0	0	Academy	26 December 2012	Trainee	2016
Midfielders
4	Ryan Woods	CM/RB	(England)	Norton Canes	13 December 1993 (age 32)	96	1	Academy	1 July 2012	Trainee	2015
7	Ashley Vincent	LM/RM	(England)	Oldbury	26 May 1985 (age 41)	10	0	Cheltenham Town	20 May 2014	Free	2016
11	Liam Lawrence (C)	LM/RM/CM	(Republic of Ireland)	(England) Retford	14 December 1981 (age 44)	38	6	Barnsley	4 July 2014	Free	2016
14	James Wesolowski	CM	(Australia)	Sydney	25 August 1987 (age 39)	28	1	Oldham Athletic	6 June 2014	Free	2016
15	Aaron Wildig	CM	(England)	Hereford	15 April 1992 (age 34)	71	6	Cardiff City	8 November 2011	Free	2015
16	Keith Southern	CM	(England)	Gateshead	24 April 1981 (age 45)	6	0	Fleetwood Town	19 January 2015	Loan	End of season 2015
17	James Caton	LM/RM	(England)	Widnes	4 January 1994 (age 32)	4	0	Blackpool	18 June 2014	Free	2016
22	Jordan Clark	LM/CM	(England)	Hoyland	22 September 1993 (age 32)	33	3	Barnsley	17 July 2014	Free	2015
24	Bobby Grant	LM/CM	(England)	Litherland	1 July 1990 (age 36)	37	6	Blackpool	9 October 2014	Loan	End of season 2015
35	Josh Ginnelly	LM/RM	(England)	Coventry	24 April 1997 (age 29)	3	0	Academy	3 May 2014	Trainee	2015
Forwards
9	James Collins	CF	(Republic of Ireland)	(England) Coventry	1 December 1990 (age 35)	126	41	Hibernian	4 June 2014	Undisclosed	2016
10	Scott Vernon	CF	(England)	Manchester	13 December 1983 (age 42)	26	2	Aberdeen	18 June 2014	Free	2016
19	Andy Mangan	CF	(England)	Liverpool	30 August 1986 (age 40)	36	10	Forest Green Rovers	24 July 2014	Undisclosed	2015
23	Tyrone Barnett	CF	(England)	Stevenage	28 October 1985 (age 40)	18	4	Peterborough United	2 February 2015	Undisclosed	2017
26	Jean-Louis Akpa Akpro	CF	(France)	Toulouse	4 January 1985 (age 41)	51	9	Tranmere Rovers	2 July 2014	Free	Undisclosed
28	Mikael Mandron	CF	(Scotland)	France	11 October 1994 (age 31)	3	0	Sunderland	29 January 2015	Loan	End of season 2015

== Transfers ==
=== In ===
Date	Position	Nationality	Name	From	Fee	Ref.
20 May 2014	MF	(England)	Ashley Vincent	(England) Cheltenham Town	Free	
22 May 2014	DF	(England)	Nathaniel Knight-Percival	(England) Peterborough United	Free	
30 May 2014	DF	(England)	Mark Ellis	(England) Crewe Alexandra	Free	
2 June 2014	DF	(England)	Mickey Demetriou	(England) Kidderminster Harriers	Free	
4 June 2014	FW	(Republic of Ireland)	James Collins	(Scotland) Hibernian	Undisclosed	
5 June 2014	GK	(England)	Mark Halstead	(England) Blackpool	Free	
6 June 2014	MF	(Australia)	James Wesolowski	(England) Oldham Athletic	Free	
11 June 2014	GK	(Switzerland)	Jayson Leutwiler	(England) Middlesbrough	Free	
18 June 2014	FW	(England)	Scott Vernon	(Scotland) Aberdeen	Free	
18 June 2014	MF	(England)	James Caton	(England) Blackpool	Free	
2 July 2014	FW	(France)	Jean-Louis Akpa Akpro	(England) Tranmere Rovers	Free	
4 July 2014	MF	(Republic of Ireland)	Liam Lawrence	(England) Barnsley	Free	
10 July 2014	DF	(England)	Cameron Gayle	(England) West Bromwich Albion	Free	
17 July 2014	MF	(England)	Jordan Clark	(England) Barnsley	Free	
17 July 2014	MF	(England)	Andy Robinson	(England) Tranmere Rovers	Free	
24 July 2014	FW	(England)	Andy Mangan	(England) Forest Green Rovers	Free	
27 August 2014	MF	(Montserrat)	Anthony Griffith	(England) Harrogate	Free	
2 February 2015	FW	(England)	Tyrone Barnett	(England) Peterborough United	Undisclosed	

=== Out ===
Date	Position	Nationality	Name	To	Fee	Ref.
13 May 2014	GK	(England)	Joe Anyon	(England) Scunthorpe United	Free	
13 May 2014	MF	(England)	Asa Hall	(England) Cheltenham Town	Free	
13 May 2014	DF	(Wales)	Joe Jacobson	(England) Wycombe Wanderers	Free	
13 May 2014	DF	(England)	Alex McQuade	(England) Guiseley	Free	
13 May 2014	MF	(Wales)	Paul Parry	Released	Free	
13 May 2014	MF	(England)	Luke Summerfield	(England) York City	Free	
13 May 2014	GK	(England)	Chris Weale	(England) Yeovil Town	Free	
2 June 2014	MF	(England)	Tamika Mkandawire	(United States) Tampa Bay Rowdies	Free	
2 June 2014	DF	(England)	Dave Winfield	(England) York City	Free	
4 June 2014	MF	(England)	Jon Taylor	(England) Peterborough United	Undisclosed	
23 June 2014	FW	(Wales)	Tom Bradshaw	(England) Walsall	Undisclosed	
15 January 2015	MF	(Montserrat)	Anthony Griffith	(England) Carlisle United	Free	
16 January 2015	MF	(Republic of Ireland)	David McAllister	(England) Stevenage	Free	
19 March 2015	MF	(England)	Andy Robinson	Retired	Free	

=== Loans in ===
Date From	Date To	Position	Nationality	Name	From	Ref.
9 October 2014	30 June 2015	MF	(England)	Bobby Grant	Blackpool	
18 October 2014	24 November 2014	DF	(Scotland)	Jack Grimmer	Fulham	
27 November 2014	5 January 2014	DF	(England)	Josh Passley	Fulham	
17 January 2015	15 February 2015	DF	(England)	Connor Randall	Liverpool	
19 January 2015	30 June 2015	MF	(England)	Keith Southern	Fleetwood Town	
28 January 2015	30 June 2015	FW	(France)	Mikael Mandron	Sunderland	
13 March 2015	30 June 2015	DF	(Northern Ireland)	Rhys Sharpe	Derby County	

=== Loans out ===
Date From	Date To	Position	Nationality	Name	To	Ref.
26 September 2014	7 April 2015	DF	(Wales)	Dominic Smith	Tamworth	
16 October 2014	5 January 2015	MF	(Republic of Ireland)	David McAllister	Stevenage	
23 December 2014	1 January 2015	GK	(England)	Callum Burton	Nuneaton Town	
17 January 2015	15 February 2015	GK	(England)	Callum Burton	Southport	
19 January 2015	21 February 2015	MF	(England)	Aaron Wildig	Kidderminster Harriers	
19 January 2015	21 February 2015	MF	(England)	James Caton	Southport	
20 March 2015	19 April 2015	MF	(England)	Aaron Wildig	Morecambe	

== Competitions ==
=== League Two ===
Pos	Team	Pld	W	D	L	GF	GA	GD	Pts	Promotion, qualification or relegation
1	Burton Albion (C, P)	46	28	10	8	69	39	+30	94	Promotion to Football League One
2	Shrewsbury Town (P)	46	27	8	11	67	31	+36	89	Promotion to Football League One
3	Bury (P)	46	26	7	13	60	40	+20	85	Promotion to Football League One
4	Wycombe Wanderers	46	23	15	8	67	45	+22	84	Qualification for League Two play-offs (Note: Four teams play for one spot and promotion to Football League One.)
5	Southend United (O, P)	46	24	12	10	54	38	+16	84	Qualification for League Two play-offs

Updated to match(es) played on 23 May 2015. Source: BBC Sport
Rules for classification: 1) Points; 2) Goal difference; 3) Number of goals scored
(C) Champions; (O) Play-off winners; (P) Promoted

== Match details ==
=== Pre-season friendlies ===
12 July 2014	Shrewsbury Town	2–0	Chesterfield	Shrewsbury
15:00	Collins 36'; Curran 55'	Report		Stadium: New Meadow; Referee: James Adcock

15 July 2014	Shrewsbury Town	1–2	West Bromwich Albion	Shrewsbury
19:45	Vernon 30'	Report	Anichebe 12'; Mulumbu 34'	Stadium: New Meadow; Attendance: 2,831; Referee: Chris Sargeson

19 July 2014	Shrewsbury Town	2–2	Watford	Shrewsbury
15:00	Vernon 83', 90+1'	Report	Tőzsér 18'; Hoban 48'	Stadium: New Meadow

26 July 2014	Shrewsbury Town	0–0	Kilmarnock	Shrewsbury
15:00 BST		Report		Stadium: New Meadow; Attendance: 1,683

29 July 2014	Kidderminster Harriers	1–1	Shrewsbury Town	Kidderminster
19:45	Styche 19'	Report	Collins 72'	Stadium: Aggborough; Attendance: 1,010

1 August 2014	Altrincham	1–2	Shrewsbury Town	Altrincham
19:45	Clee 31' (pen.)	Report	Clark 44'; Caton 63'	Stadium: Moss Lane; Referee: Peter Bankes

=== League Two ===
The fixtures for the 2014–15 season were announced on 18 June 2014 at 9am.

9 August 2014 1	AFC Wimbledon	2–2	Shrewsbury Town	Norbiton
15:00	Tubbs 26'; Rigg 74'	Report	Collins 9', 84'	Stadium: Kingsmeadow; Attendance: 4,162; Referee: Keith Hill

16 August 2014 2	Shrewsbury Town	2–1	Tranmere Rovers	Shrewsbury
15:00	Mangan 90'; Demetriou 90'	Report	Bell-Baggie 42'	Stadium: New Meadow; Attendance: 5,249; Referee: Steve Martin

19 August 2014 3	Shrewsbury Town	4–0	Accrington Stanley	Shrewsbury
19:45	Mangan 7', 65'; Akpa Akpro 44' (pen.); Goldson 45'	Report		Stadium: New Meadow; Attendance: 4,298; Referee: Chris Sarginson

23 August 2014 4	Northampton Town	1–1	Shrewsbury Town	Northampton
15:00	Sinclair 90'	Report	Collins 63'	Stadium: Sixfields Stadium; Attendance: 4,369; Referee: Darren Deadman

30 August 2014 5	Shrewsbury Town	2–0	Luton Town	Shrewsbury
15:00	Clark 3', 70'	Report		Stadium: New Meadow; Attendance: 5,888; Referee: Peter Bankes

6 September 2014 6	Hartlepool United	2–0	Shrewsbury Town	Hartlepool
15:00	Wyke 5'; Walker 79'	Report		Stadium: Victoria Park; Attendance: 3,368; Referee: Jeremy Simpson

13 September 2014 7	Stevenage	1–0	Shrewsbury Town	Stevenage
15:00	Charles 36'	Report		Stadium: Broadhall Way; Referee: Gavin Ward

16 September 2014 8	Shrewsbury Town	1–0	Carlisle United	Shrewsbury
19:45	Grandison 42'	Report		Stadium: New Meadow; Attendance: 3,833; Referee: Graham Salisbury

20 September 2014 9	Shrewsbury Town	0–0	Newport County	Shrewsbury
15:00		Report		Stadium: New Meadow; Attendance: 4,904; Referee: Darren Handley

27 September 2014 10	Southend United	1–0	Shrewsbury Town	Southend-on-Sea
15:00	Coulthirst 2'	Report		Stadium: Roots Hall; Attendance: 6,951; Referee: Kevin Johnson

4 October 2014 11	Plymouth Argyle	1–0	Shrewsbury Town	Plymouth
15:00	Reid 33'	Report		Stadium: Home Park; Attendance: 6,229; Referee: Stuart Attwell

11 October 2014 12	Shrewsbury Town	3–1	Cheltenham Town	Shrewsbury
15:00	Collins 50'; Mangan 55'; Knight-Percival 69'	Report	Harrison 48'	Stadium: New Meadow; Attendance: 4,817; Referee: Seb Stockbridge

18 October 2014 13	York City	0–1	Shrewsbury Town	York
15:00		Report	Collins 87'	Stadium: Bootham Crescent; Attendance: 3,651; Referee: Michael Bull

21 October 2014 14	Shrewsbury Town	5–0	Bury	Shrewsbury
19:45	Akpa Akpro 3', 35', 51'; Goldson 19'; Clark 73'	Report		Stadium: New Meadow; Attendance: 4,233; Referee: Andy Woolmer

25 October 2014 15	Shrewsbury Town	2–1	Portsmouth	Shrewsbury
15:00	Wesolowski 13'; Goldson 72'	Report	Wallace 3' (pen.)	Stadium: New Meadow; Attendance: 5,515; Referee: Dean Whitestone

1 November 2014 16	Dagenham & Redbridge	1–2	Shrewsbury Town	Dagenham
15:00	Bingham 6'	Report	Mangan 70'; Lawrence 90+4' (pen.)	Stadium: Victoria Road; Attendance: 1,698; Referee: Darren Sheldrake

15 November 2014 17	Shrewsbury Town	2–0	Mansfield Town	Shrewsbury
15:00	Grant 59'; Collins 75'	Report		Stadium: New Meadow; Attendance: 5,001; Referee: Darren Handley

22 November 2014 18	Exeter City	3–2	Shrewsbury Town	Exeter
15:00	Nichols 46', 90'; Wheeler 75'	Report	Collins 13', 34'	Stadium: St James Park; Attendance: 3,993; Referee: Chris Sarginson

29 November 2014 19	Shrewsbury Town	1–0	Burton Albion	Shrewsbury
15:00	Akpa Akpro 82'	Report		Stadium: New Meadow; Attendance: 5,170; Referee: Seb Stockbridge

13 December 2014 20	Cambridge United	0–0	Shrewsbury Town	Cambridge
15:00		Report		Stadium: Abbey Stadium; Attendance: 5,346; Referee: Tim Robinson

20 December 2014 21	Shrewsbury Town	1–0	Morecambe	Shrewsbury
15:00	Mangan 86'	Report		Stadium: New Meadow; Attendance: 4,708; Referee: Kevin Wright

26 December 2014 22	Oxford United	0–2	Shrewsbury Town	Oxford
15:00		Report	Collins 13'; Ellis 18'	Stadium: Kassam Stadium; Attendance: 7,502; Referee: Lee Probert

28 December 2014 23	Shrewsbury Town	0–0	Wycombe Wanderers	Shrewsbury
15:00		Report		Stadium: New Meadow; Attendance: 7,239; Referee: Mark Clattenburg

3 January 2015 24	Burton Albion	1–0	Shrewsbury Town	Burton on Trent
15:00	Taft 60'	Report		Stadium: Pirelli Stadium; Attendance: 4,555; Referee: Brendan Malone

8 January 2015 25	Luton Town	0–0	Shrewsbury Town	Luton
19:45		Report		Stadium: Kenilworth Road; Attendance: 7,666; Referee: James Adcock

17 January 2015 26	Shrewsbury Town	3–0	Hartlepool United	Shrewsbury
15:00	Mangan 50', 68'; Collins 59'	Report		Stadium: New Meadow; Attendance: 4,601; Referee: Sebastian Stocksbridge

24 January 2015 27	Shrewsbury Town	3–2	Stevenage	Shrewsbury
15:00	Collins 22', 88'; Lawrence 24' (pen.)	Report	Marriott 10'; Wells 42'	Stadium: New Meadow; Attendance: 4,565; Referee: Tony Harrington

31 January 2015 28	Newport County	0–1	Shrewsbury Town	Newport
15:00		Report	Akpa Akpro 77'	Stadium: Rodney Parade; Attendance: 3,706; Referee: James Linington

7 February 2015 29	Shrewsbury Town	1–1	Southend United	Shrewsbury
15:00	Barnett 85'	Report	Payne 54'	Stadium: New Meadow; Attendance: 5,276; Referee: Carl Boyeson

10 February 2015 30	Carlisle United	1–2	Shrewsbury Town	Carlisle
19:45	Wyke 66'	Report	Demetriou 90'; Collins 90'	Stadium: Brunton Park; Attendance: 3,624; Referee: Eddie Ilderton

14 February 2015 31	Shrewsbury Town	2–0	AFC Wimbledon	Shrewsbury
15:00	Lawrence 45'; Vernon 49'	Report		Stadium: New Meadow; Attendance: 4,992; Referee: Andy Haines

21 February 2015 32	Tranmere Rovers	2−1	Shrewsbury Town	Tranmere
15:00 GMT	Donnelly 29'; Holmes 32'	Report	Goldson 82'	Stadium: Prenton Park; Attendance: 5,987; Referee: Mark Brown

28 February 2015 33	Shrewsbury Town	1−2	Northampton Town	Shrewsbury
15:00 GMT	Demetriou 84'	Report	Hackett 20'; Byrom 47'	Stadium: New Meadow; Attendance: 5,310; Referee: Chris Kavanagh

3 March 2015 34	Accrington Stanley	1−2	Shrewsbury Town	Accrington
19:45 GMT	Windass 38' (pen.)	Report	Grant 11', 87'	Stadium: Crown Ground; Attendance: 1,137; Referee: Geoff Eltringham

7 March 2015 35	Shrewsbury Town	1−1	Cambridge United	Shrewsbury
15:00 GMT	Grant 16'	Report	Kaikai 90'	Stadium: New Meadow; Attendance: 5,075; Referee: Michael Bull

14 March 2015 36	Wycombe Wanderers	1−0	Shrewsbury Town	High Wycombe
15:00 GMT	Wood 1'	Report		Stadium: Adams Park; Attendance: 4,697; Referee: Graham Scott

17 March 2015 37	Morecambe	1−4	Shrewsbury Town	Morecambe
19:45 GMT	Redshaw 28'	Report	Goldson 33'; Collins 35'; Grandison 85'; Barnett 90'	Stadium: Globe Arena; Attendance: 1,363; Referee: Stuart Attwell

21 March 2015 38	Shrewsbury Town	2−0	Oxford United	Shrewsbury
15:00 GMT	Lawrence 2' (pen.), 82'	Report		Stadium: New Meadow; Attendance: 5,265; Referee: Tony Harrington

28 March 2015 39	Portsmouth	0−2	Shrewsbury Town	Portsmouth
15:00 GMT		Report	Grant 25', 66'	Stadium: Fratton Park; Attendance: 14,749; Referee: Lee Collins

3 April 2015 40	Shrewsbury Town	2−0	Dagenham & Redbridge	Shrewsbury
15:00 GMT	Goldson 17', 22'	Report		Stadium: New Meadow; Attendance: 6,143; Referee: Keith Hill

6 April 2015 41	Mansfield Town	0−1	Shrewsbury Town	Mansfield
13:00 GMT		Report	Barnett 50'	Stadium: Field Mill; Attendance: 3,108; Referee: Tim Robinson

11 April 2015 42	Shrewsbury Town	4−0	Exeter City	Shrewsbury
15:00 GMT	Akpa Akpro 18', 73'; Collins 62'; Barnett 90'	Report		Stadium: New Meadow; Attendance: 5,442; Referee: Charles Breakspear

14 April 2015 43	Bury	1−0	Shrewsbury Town	Bury
19:45 GMT	Riley 57'	Report		Stadium: Gigg Lane; Attendance: 4,277; Referee: Dean Whitestone

18 April 2015 44	Shrewsbury Town	1−0	York City	Shrewsbury
15:00 GMT	Ellis 12'	Report		Stadium: New Meadow; Attendance: 6,400; Referee: Brendan Malone

25 April 2015 45	Cheltenham Town	0−1	Shrewsbury Town	Cheltenham
15:00 GMT	Akpa Akpro 20'	Report		Stadium: Whaddon Road; Attendance: 5,117; Referee: Trevor Kettle

2 May 2015 46	Shrewsbury Town	0−2	Plymouth Argyle	Shrewsbury
15:00 GMT		Report	Reid 3'; Mellor 44'	Stadium: New Meadow; Attendance: 8,963 (1,094 away); Referee: Darren Bond

=== FA Cup ===
The draw for the first round was made on 27 October 2014 at 1900. Shrewsbury were drawn away at Walsall.

8 November 2014 First round	Walsall	2–2	Shrewsbury Town	Walsall
15:00	Bradshaw 56', 90'	Report	Ellis 5'; Collins 61'	Stadium: Bescot Stadium; Attendance: 3,546; Referee: Darren Deadman

18 November 2014 replay	Shrewsbury Town	1–0	Walsall	Shrewsbury
19:45	Lawrence 53'	Report		Stadium: New Meadow; Attendance: 4,222; Referee: Gavin Ward

6 December 2014 Second round	Preston North End	1–0	Shrewsbury Town	Preston
15:00	Huntington 19'	Report		Stadium: Deepdale; Attendance: 6,011; Referee: David Webb

=== League Cup ===
The draw for the first round was made on 17 June 2014 and Shrewsbury were drawn at home against Blackpool. For the second round the draw was made on 13 August 2014 and this time Shrewsbury were drawn away at Leicester City. The draw for the third round was made on 27 August 2014 when Shrewsbury were drawn at home to Norwich City. On 24 September 2014, the draw for the fourth round was made and Shrewsbury were drawn at home to Premier League club Chelsea.

12 August 2014 First round	Shrewsbury Town	1–0	Blackpool	Shrewsbury
19:45	Vernon 34'	Report		Stadium: New Meadow; Attendance: 4,524; Referee: Mark Heywood

26 August 2014 Second round	Leicester City	0–1	Shrewsbury Town	Leicester
19:45		Report	Mangan 38'	Stadium: King Power Stadium; Attendance: 8,017; Referee: Simon Hooper

23 September 2014 Third round	Shrewsbury Town	1–0	Norwich City	Shrewsbury
19:45	Collins 54'	Report		Stadium: New Meadow; Attendance: 6,187; Referee: Scott Mathieson

28 October 2014 Fourth round	Shrewsbury Town	1–2	Chelsea	Shrewsbury
19:45	Mangan 77'	Report	Drogba 48'; Grandison 81' (o.g.)	Stadium: New Meadow; Attendance: 10,210; Referee: Neil Swarbrick

=== Football League Trophy ===
The draw for the first round was made on 16 August 2014.

2 September 2014 First round	Preston North End	1–0	Shrewsbury Town	Preston
19:45	Hayhurst 58'	Report		Stadium: Deepdale; Attendance: 4,029; Referee: Chris Kavanagh

=== Shropshire Senior Cup ===
Shrewsbury Town received a bye to the semi-final stage.

9 December 2014 Semi-final	Shrewsbury Town	3–2	Ellesmere Rangers	Shrewsbury
19:00	Niall Flint 13'; Jordan Wilson 43'; Sean Griffiths 55' (O.G.)	Report	Scott Ryan 15', 56'	Stadium: New Meadow; Attendance: 141; Referee: Adam Dean

3 March 2015 Final	A.F.C. Telford United	1–3	Shrewsbury Town	Telford
19:30	Mike Grogan 41'	Report	Caton 22'; Ethan Jones 35'; Ginnelly 45'	Stadium: New Bucks Head; Attendance: 345; Referee: Gratton

== Player statistics ==
=== Squad stats ===
As of match played 2 May 2015

No.	Pos	Nat	Player	Total		League Two		FA Cup		League Cup		League Trophy	
No.	Pos	Nat	Player	Apps	Goals	Apps	Goals	Apps	Goals	Apps	Goals	Apps	Goals
1	GK	(Switzerland) SUI	Jayson Leutwiler	54	0	46	0	3	0	4	0	1	0
2	DF	(England) ENG	Jermaine Grandison	42	2	32+4	2	2	0	3	0	1	0
3	DF	(England) ENG	Mickey Demetriou	49	3	40+2	3	2+1	0	3	0	1	0
4	MF	(England) ENG	Ryan Woods	51	0	41+2	0	3	0	4	0	1	0
5	DF	(England) ENG	Mark Ellis	35	3	32	2	1	1	1	0	1	0
6	DF	(England) ENG	Connor Goldson	51	7	44	7	3	0	4	0	0	0
7	MF	(England) ENG	Ashley Vincent	10	0	4+4	0	0	0	1+1	0	0	0
9	FW	(Ireland) EIR	James Collins	53	17	42+3	15	3	1	4	1	0+1	0
10	FW	(England) ENG	Scott Vernon	26	2	12+10	1	0+1	0	1+1	1	0+1	0
11	MF	(Ireland) EIR	Liam Lawrence	39	6	30+3	5	3	1	2+1	0	0	0
12	DF	(England) ENG	Cameron Gayle	33	0	27+1	0	1	0	3	0	1	0
14	MF	(Australia) AUS	James Wesolowski	28	1	18+3	1	2+1	0	3	0	0+1	0
16	MF	(England) ENG	Keith Southern	6	0	3+3	0	0	0	0	0	0	0
17	MF	(England) ENG	James Caton	4	0	0+2	0	0	0	0+1	0	1	0
19	FW	(England) ENG	Andy Mangan	36	10	10+20	8	1+1	0	1+3	2	0	0
20	DF	(England) ENG	Nathaniel Knight-Percival	36	1	28	1	3	0	4	0	1	0
21	GK	(England) ENG	Mark Halstead	2	0	0+1	0	0+1	0	0	0	0	0
22	MF	(England) ENG	Jordan Clark	33	3	18+9	3	0+2	0	2+1	0	1	0
23	FW	(England) ENG	Tyrone Barnett	18	4	8+10	4	0	0	0	0	0	0
24	MF	(England) ENG	Bobby Grant	37	6	28+5	6	3	0	1	0	0	0
26	FW	(France) FRA	Jean-Louis Akpa Akpro	51	9	27+18	9	2	0	2+1	0	1	0
28	FW	(Scotland) SCO	Mikael Mandron	3	0	2+1	0	0	0	0	0	0	0
29	DF	(Northern Ireland) NIR	Rhys Sharpe	3	0	2+1	0	0	0	0	0	0	0
31	DF	(Wales) WAL	Dominic Smith	0	0	0	0	0	0	0	0	0	0
35	MF	(England) ENG	Josh Ginnelly	3	0	0+3	0	0	0	0	0	0	0
36	GK	(England) ENG	Callum Burton	0	0	0	0	0	0	0	0	0	0
Players away from the club on loan:
15	MF	(England) ENG	Aaron Wildig	1	0	0+1	0	0	0	0	0	0	0
Players who left the club before the end of the season:
8	MF	(Ireland) EIR	David McAllister	0	0	0	0	0	0	0	0	0	0
16	MF	(Montserrat) MSR	Anthony Griffith	6	0	1+4	0	0	0	0+0	0	1	0
18	MF	(England) ENG	Andy Robinson	3	0	0+2	0	0	0	0+1	0	0	0
23	DF	(England) ENG	Josh Passley	7	0	6	0	1	0	0	0	0	0
25	DF	(Scotland) SCO	Jack Grimmer	7	0	6	0	0	0	1	0	0	0
27	DF	(England) ENG	Connor Randall	1	0	0+1	0	0	0	0	0	0	0

=== Top scorers ===
Place	Position	Nation	Number	Name	League Two	FA Cup	League Cup	FL Trophy	Total
1	FW	(Republic of Ireland)	9	James Collins	15	1	1	0	17
2	FW	(England)	19	Andy Mangan	8	0	2	0	10
3	FW	(France)	26	Jean-Louis Akpa Akpro	9	0	0	0	9
4	DF	(England)	6	Connor Goldson	7	0	0	0	7
5	MF	(England)	24	Bobby Grant	6	0	0	0	6
5	MF	(Republic of Ireland)	11	Liam Lawrence	5	1	0	0	6
6	FW	(England)	23	Tyrone Barnett	4	0	0	0	4
7	DF	(England)	5	Mark Ellis	2	1	0	0	3
7	DF	(England)	3	Mickey Demetriou	3	0	0	0	3
7	MF	(England)	22	Jordan Clark	3	0	0	0	3
8	DF	(England)	2	Jermaine Grandison	2	0	0	0	2
8	FW	(England)	10	Scott Vernon	1	0	1	0	2
9	MF	(Australia)	14	James Wesolowski	1	0	0	0	1
9	DF	(England)	20	Nathaniel Knight-Percival	1	0	0	0	1

=== Disciplinary record ===
No.	Nat.	Pos.	Name	League One		FA Cup		EFL Cup		EFL Trophy		Total	
No.	Nat.	Pos.	Name	Booked	Sent off (straight red)	Booked	Sent off (straight red)	Booked	Sent off (straight red)	Booked	Sent off (straight red)	Booked	Sent off (straight red)
1	SUI	GK	Jayson Leutwiler	2	0	0	0	1	0	0	0	3	0
2	ENG	DF	Jermaine Grandison	2	1	0	0	0	0	1	0	3	1
2	ENG	DF	Mickey Demetriou	1	0	0	0	0	0	1	0	2	0
4	ENG	MF	Ryan Woods	8	0	2	0	1	0	0	0	11	0
5	ENG	DF	Mark Ellis	2	0	0	0	0	0	0	0	2	0
6	ENG	DF	Connor Goldson	11	0	1	0	0	0	0	0	12	0
7	ENG	MF	Ashley Vincent	1	0	0	0	0	0	0	0	1	0
9	IRE	FW	James Collins	7	0	0	0	0	0	0	0	7	0
10	ENG	FW	Scott Vernon	1	0	0	0	0	0	0	0	1	0
11	IRE	MF	Liam Lawrence	6	1	1	0	0	0	0	0	7	1
12	ENG	DF	Cameron Gayle	1	0	0	0	1	0	0	0	2	0
14	AUS	MF	James Wesolowski	4	0	0	0	1	0	0	0	5	0
16	ENG	MF	Keith Southern	0	1	0	0	0	0	0	0	0	1
19	ENG	FW	Andy Mangan	2	1	1	0	0	0	0	0	3	1
20	ENG	DF	Nathaniel Knight-Percival	6	1	1	0	0	0	0	0	7	1
21	ENG	GK	Mark Halstead	0	0	1	0	0	0	0	0	1	0
22	ENG	MF	Jordan Clark	1	0	0	0	0	0	0	0	1	0
23	ENG	FW	Tyrone Barnett	2	0	0	0	0	0	0	0	2	0
24	ENG	MF	Bobby Grant	7	0	0	0	0	0	0	0	7	0
25	SCO	DF	Jack Grimmer	1	0	0	0	0	0	0	0	1	0
26	FRA	FW	Jean-Louis Akpa Akpro	1	0	1	0	0	0	0	0	2	0
29	NIR	DF	Rhys Sharpe	1	1	0	0	0	0	0	0	1	1
