= Mark Halstead =

English footballer (born 1990)

Personal information
- Full name: Mark James Halstead
- Date of birth: 17 September 1990 (age 36)
- Place of birth: Blackpool, England
- Height: 1.91 m (6 ft 3 in)
- Position: Goalkeeper

Team information
- Current team: Colwyn Bay
- Number: 1

Youth career
- 2006–2009: Blackpool

Senior career*
Years	Team	Apps	(Gls)
2009–2014	Blackpool	3	(0)
2009	→ Burscough (loan)	6	(0)
2010	→ Hyde (loan)	8	(0)
2010	→ Barrow (loan)	1	(0)
2011	→ Kettering Town (loan)	3	(0)
2011	→ Stockport County (loan)	4	(0)
2014–2017	Shrewsbury Town	20	(0)
2017–2018	Southport	16	(0)
2018–2021	Morecambe	47	(0)
2021–2024	Torquay United	91	(0)
2024–2025	Widnes	34	(0)
2025–2026	Radcliffe	11	(0)
2026–	Colwyn Bay	16	(0)
- * Club domestic league appearances and goals as of 08:34, 8 November 2026 (UTC)

Mark James Halstead (born 17 September 1990) is an English footballer who plays as a goalkeeper for Cymru Premier club Colwyn Bay.

He began his career at Blackpool, and notably made a single appearance in the Premier League during the 2010–11 season. After his release from the Tangerines he joined Shrewsbury Town in 2014.

== Career ==
=== Blackpool ===
Born in Blackpool, Halstead is a product of the Blackpool Centre of Excellence and Youth Department, and signed his first professional contract with the club in 2009. In his first season as a professional he spent loan spells at non-league sides Burscough and Hyde United.

On 21 August 2010, he was an unused substitute in Blackpool's 6–0 defeat to Arsenal at the Emirates Stadium in the club's second game of their debut season in the Premier League. Three days later, he made his first-team debut in the second round of the 2010–11 League Cup, against MK Dons at Stadium MK.

After further brief loan spells at Barrow, and Kettering Town in the Conference Premier, Halstead made his league debut for Blackpool, as a substitute for Richard Kingson in a 3–1 defeat to Chelsea at Bloomfield Road. The score was 3–0 when he came on in the 66th minute.

In November 2011, he went on loan to Stockport County.

Halstead made his first league start for Blackpool on 9 February 2013, in a 2–1 victory over Millwall at Bloomfield Road. It was ultimately also his last appearance for the club.

=== Shrewsbury Town ===
Following his release from Blackpool, Halstead joined Shrewsbury Town in League Two on a free transfer on 5 June 2014. He made his debut as a substitute in a first-round FA Cup tie away at Walsall on 8 November, and made one subsequent appearance that season in a league match against Cambridge United, as a half-time substitute for first-choice goalkeeper Jayson Leutwiler in a 0–0 draw.

The following season, now in League One, Halstead made his first start for Shrewsbury against his former club Blackpool on 26 September 2015, keeping a clean sheet in a 2–0 win for the club's first home victory of the season.

Although Leutwiler was reinstated immediately after recovering from a back injury, Halstead had another run in the first-team when Leutwiler suffered a serious facial injury in an FA Cup second-round tie away at Grimsby Town. Coming on as a substitute, he helped Shrewsbury keep a clean sheet to set up a replay back at New Meadow, where he featured again in a 1–0 victory, to confirm a third-round tie away at Cardiff City. After conceding ten goals in two league games, he lost his place once again to Leutwiler for an away match at Burton Albion, but returned to the side for a further consecutive six matches during March and April, including one win and three draws, before being sent-off late on in a 3–1 defeat against Millwall. Halstead made one final appearance that season in the penultimate match, where despite losing 4–3 to Peterborough United, same day defeats for Blackpool and Doncaster Rovers ensured another season of League One football with one game to spare.

Halstead signed a new one-year contract extension in August 2016. Starting the season again as second-choice, he returned to the starting line-up under new manager Paul Hurst following Leutwilers first call-up to the Canada national team. It was announced Halstead was to be released by the club at the end of his contract in May 2017.

=== Southport ===
After leaving Shrewsbury, Halstead joined National League North side Southport.

=== Morecambe ===
Despite Halstead being named on Southport's retained list at the end of the 2017–18 season, he signed for Morecambe on 9 July 2018. Halstead, in an interview on the club's official website, said his move to Morecambe "was an opportunity to resurrect [his] career and one [he] couldn't turn down" and he was "delighted" to make the move back into the Football League. Morecambe manager Jim Bentley described Halstead as "experienced," "a decent all round goalkeeper" and "hungry to prove he can be number one." He signed a new two-year contract with the club in June 2019. He was released at the end of the 2020–21 season.

=== Torquay United ===
Halstead was announced as a new signing for Torquay United under manager Gary Johnson on 19 July 2021.

=== Part-time football ===
Halstead signed for Widnes for the 2024–25 season in the Northern Premier League West Division, making 47 appearances and keeping 23 clean sheets, as well as winning their Supporters' Player of the Season award and featuring in the league's 2024–25 Team of the Season. Following Widnes' withdrawal from the league after winning the title, he signed for Radcliffe for 2025–26.

=== Colwyn Bay ===
In June 2026 he moved to the Welsh league system signing for Cymru Premier club Colwyn Bay.

== Career statistics ==
As of match played 15 May 2022

Appearances and goals by club, season and competition
Club	Season	League			FA Cup		League Cup		Other		Total	
Club	Season	Division	Apps	Goals	Apps	Goals	Apps	Goals	Apps	Goals	Apps	Goals
Blackpool	2009–10	Championship	0	0	0	0	0	0	0	0	0	0
Blackpool	2010–11	Premier League	1	0	0	0	1	0	0	0	2	0
Blackpool	2011–12	Championship	0	0	0	0	1	0	0	0	1	0
Blackpool	2012–13	Championship	2	0	0	0	0	0	0	0	2	0
Blackpool	2013–14	Championship	0	0	0	0	0	0	0	0	0	0
Blackpool	Total		3	0	0	0	2	0	0	0	5	0
Burscough (loan)	2009–10	N.P.L. Division One North	6	0	0	0	0	0	0	0	6	0
Hyde (loan)	2009–10	Conference North	8	0	0	0	0	0	0	0	8	0
Barrow (loan)	2010–11	Conference Premier	1	0	0	0	0	0	0	0	1	0
Kettering Town (loan)	2010–11	Conference Premier	3	0	0	0	0	0	0	0	3	0
Stockport County (loan)	2011–12	Conference Premier	4	0	0	0	0	0	0	0	4	0
Shrewsbury Town	2014–15	League Two	1	0	1	0	0	0	0	0	2	0
Shrewsbury Town	2015–16	League One	16	0	3	0	0	0	0	0	19	0
Shrewsbury Town	2016–17	League One	3	0	0	0	0	0	2 (Note: Appearance(s) in EFL Trophy)	0	5	0
Shrewsbury Town	Total		20	0	4	0	0	0	2	0	26	0
Southport	2017–18	National League North	16	0	0	0	—		0	0	16	0
Morecambe	2018–19	League Two	26	0	2	0	0	0	3	0	31	0
Morecambe	2019–20	League Two	12	0	1	0	2	0	3	0	18	0
Morecambe	2020–21	League Two	9	0	2	0	2	0	3	0	16	0
Morecambe	Total		47	0	5	0	4	0	9	0	65	0
Torquay United	2021–22	National League	8	0	0	0	—		1 (Note: Appearance(s) in the FA Trophy)	0	9	0
Career total			116	0	9	0	6	0	12	0	143	0

== Honours ==
Morecambe

- EFL League Two play-offs: 2021
