= Dominic Smith (footballer, born 1996) =

English footballer (born 1996)

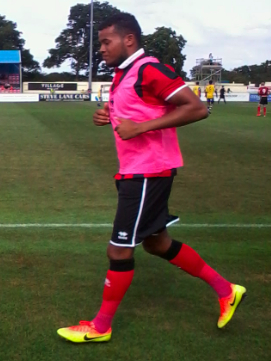
- Smith in 2016

Personal information
- Full name: Dominic James Smith
- Date of birth: 9 February 1996 (age 30)
- Place of birth: Wellington, Shropshire, England
- Height: 6 ft 2 in (1.88 m)
- Position: Defender

Team information
- Current team: Caernarfon Town
- Number: 15

Youth career
- −2014: Shrewsbury Town

Senior career*
Years	Team	Apps	(Gls)
2014–2018	Shrewsbury Town	31	(0)
2014–2015	→ Tamworth (loan)	23	(1)
2016	→ Barrow (loan)	6	(0)
2017	→ Southport (loan)	23	(0)
2018–2019	AFC Telford United	25	(1)
2019	→ Alfreton Town (loan)	9	(0)
2019–2023	Alfreton Town	124	(7)
2023-2025	Newtown	65	(5)
2025–	Caernarfon Town	31	(2)

International career
2013–2015	Wales U19	13	(0)
2015–2016	Wales U21	3	(0)
- * Club domestic league appearances and goals as of 08:27, 8 November 2026 (UTC)

Dominic James Smith (born 9 February 1996) is an English born footballer who plays as a defender for Caernarfon Town. A product of the Shrewsbury Town youth system, he is eligible to play for Wales, for whom he has represented at Under−19 and Under−21 level.

== Club career ==
Smith joined the Shrewsbury Town youth system at the age of seven, and was allocated a squad number by manager Graham Turner in December 2012, making the match-day squad for the first time in a League One home match against Brentford where he was an unused substitute in a goalless draw at the New Meadow.

He signed his first professional contract in February 2014, and spent most of the following season on loan at Conference North side Tamworth. He made his senior debut on 4 October, playing in a 2–2 draw away to Guiseley in which he was given a yellow card in the 74th minute. He made 23 league appearances for the Lambs and two more in the FA Cup, scoring the equaliser in a 2–2 home draw against North Ferriby United on 8 November. His loan was extended on 31 December, and he was recalled by Shrewsbury on 9 April 2015.

Smith made his Football League and Shrewsbury debut in a 4–2 home win over Colchester United on 10 October 2015, playing the full 90 minutes. Featuring regularly during the 2015–16 season, he signed a contract extension in March 2016, keeping him at the club until summer 2018.

Early the following season, Smith joined National League side Barrow on loan until January 2017, however he was recalled in October 2016 by new manager Paul Hurst due to an injury crisis at his parent club.

After featuring only infrequently following his recall, Smith subsequently joined National League North side Southport on a half-season loan in July 2017. Hurst hoped that Smith would "catch the eye" during this loan spell, in order for him to secure a future away from Shrewsbury, as he was out of the clubs plans.

On his return to his parent club, he was released by mutual consent in March 2018, going on to join local rivals AFC Telford United on a deal until the end of the season. On 11 January 2019, Smith was loaned out to Alfreton Town for one month. After playing five games for the club, it was announced on 13 February, that the loan deal had been extended until the end of the season. However, Smith was recalled by Telford on 26 March 2019.

He joined Alfreton on a permanent basis in summer 2019, signing a one-year deal.

In June 2025 he signed for Caernarfon Town.

== International career ==
Smith is eligible to represent Wales owing to his Welsh grandmother, and made his debut for the Under−19 squad in May 2013. He was called up to the Under−21 squad for the first time in March 2015, making his debut in the 54th minute of a 3–1 win over Bulgaria in Cardiff. He won his second cap, and made his first start, for the Under−21 side in September 2016, playing the entirety of a 4–0 defeat against Denmark in a 2017 UEFA European Under-21 Championship qualifying match.

== Style of play ==
Smith can play at either centre-back or right full-back.

== Personal life ==
Smith attended Belvidere School in Shrewsbury as a youngster.

== Career statistics ==
As of match played 7 May 2023

Appearances and goals by club, season and competition
Club	Season	League			FA Cup		League Cup		Other		Total	
Club	Season	Division	Apps	Goals	Apps	Goals	Apps	Goals	Apps	Goals	Apps	Goals
Shrewsbury Town	2012–13	League One	0	0	0	0	0	0	0	0	0	0
Shrewsbury Town	2013–14	League One	0	0	0	0	0	0	0	0	0	0
Shrewsbury Town	2014–15	League Two	0	0	—		0	0	0	0	0	0
Shrewsbury Town	2015–16	League One	21	0	3	0	0	0	0	0	24	0
Shrewsbury Town	2016–17	League One	10	0	2	0	0	0	1 (Note: Appearance in the EFL Trophy)	0	13	0
Shrewsbury Town	2017–18	League One	0	0	0	0	0	0	0	0	0	0
Shrewsbury Town	Total		31	0	5	0	0	0	1	0	37	0
Tamworth (loan)	2014–15	Conference North	23	1	2	0	—		0	0	25	1
Barrow (loan)	2016–17	National League	6	0	—		—		—		6	0
Southport (loan)	2017–18	National League North	23	0	0	0	—		0	0	23	0
AFC Telford United	2017–18	National League North	12	1	—		—		—		12	1
AFC Telford United	2018–19	National League North	13	0	0	0	—		2 (Note: Appearances in the FA Trophy)	0	15	0
AFC Telford United	Total		77	2	2	0	0	0	2	0	81	2
Alfreton Town (loan)	2018–19	National League North	9	0	—		—		1	0	10	0
Alfreton Town	2019–20	National League North	29	1	2	0	—		2	1	33	2
Alfreton Town	2020–21	National League North	15	0	1	1	—		1	0	17	1
Alfreton Town	2021–22	National League North	38	3	1	0	—		2	0	41	3
Alfreton Town	2022-23	National League North	42	3	1	0	—		1	0	44	3
Newtown AFC	2023-24	Cymru Premier	33	3	2	1	1	0	0	0	36	4
Newtown AFC	2024-25	Cymru Premier	32	2	0	0	1	0	0	0	33	2
Caernarfon Town	2025-26	Cymru Premier	25	2	4	1	2	0	0	0	31	3
	Total		223	14	8	3	3	0	7	1	245	18
Career total			331	16	15	3	3	0	10	1	363	20

== Honours ==
Caernarfon Town

- Welsh Cup: 2025–26
