= Sam Patterson (footballer) =

English footballer

Personal information
- Date of birth: 29 October 1993 (age 33)
- Positions: Right back; midfielder

Senior career*
Years	Team	Apps	(Gls)
2013–2014	Barnsley	0	(0)
2013–2014	→ FC Halifax Town (loan)	2	(0)
2014–2015	Bradford Park Avenue	14	(1)
2015–2016	Shrewsbury Town	0	(0)
2016	Bradford Park Avenue	14	(1)
2016–2017	Altrincham	31	(1)
- * Club domestic league appearances and goals as of 23 January 2016

Sam Patterson (born 29 October 1993) is an English former footballer who played as a right back or midfielder.

== Career ==
Patterson began his career at Barnsley. He was first included in a matchday squad on 9 April 2013, remaining an unused substitute in their 1–1 Championship draw away to Cardiff City, and a week later was used in the same way for a game at Oakwell against Derby County, with the same outcome.

On 26 November 2013, he was loaned to fellow Yorkshire team FC Halifax Town until 5 January 2014. He made his senior debut that same day, replacing the injured Danny Lowe before half time in a 3–2 Conference Premier loss away to Hereford United at Edgar Street. On 7 December, he made the only other appearance of his loan, again as the replacement for an injured player, filling in for Matty Pearson for the final 29 minutes of a 3–4 loss to Woking at The Shay.

Released by Barnsley in the summer of 2014, Patterson went on to another club in the county, Bradford Park Avenue of the Conference North. On 26 December that year, he made his first senior start, playing the full 90 minutes as Bradford lost 2–1 at Chorley. He played 14 league games for the Avenue that season, scoring once, a second-minute opener in a 1–1 draw with Lowestoft Town at the Horsfall Stadium on 21 February 2015.

On 21 August 2015, he signed a one-year contract with the option of a second year for League One club Shrewsbury Town, joining up with manager Micky Mellon, who was assistant manager during his spell at Barnsley. He played his first professional game on 1 September, featuring for the entirety of a 2–0 home win over Oldham Athletic in the first round of the Football League Trophy, and made one subsequent appearance for the club in the next round of the competition, a 2–1 defeat away at Fleetwood Town the following month. Having not broken into the first-team, he was released by mutual agreement in January 2016, rejoining his former club Bradford Park Avenue shortly afterwards.

Patterson joined Altrincham ahead of the 2016–17 season in May 2016.

== Career statistics ==
As of 7 October 2015

Appearances and goals by club, season and competition
Club	Season	League			FA Cup		League Cup		Other		Total	
Club	Season	Division	Apps	Goals	Apps	Goals	Apps	Goals	Apps	Goals	Apps	Goals
Barnsley	2013–14	Championship	0	0	0	0	0	0	0	0	0	0
FC Halifax Town (loan)	2013–14	Conference Premier	2	0	0	0	0	0	1 (Note: Appearance in FA Trophy)	0	3	0
Bradford Park Avenue	2014–15	Conference North	14	1	0	0	0	0	0	0	14	1
Shrewsbury Town	2015–16	League One	0	0	0	0	0	0	2 (Note: Appearance in Football League Trophy)	0	2	0
Bradford Park Avenue	2015-2016	Conference North	14	0	0	0	0	0	2	0	16	0
Altrincham FC	2016-2017	Conference North	31	1	1	0	0	0	6	0	33	1
Career total			61	1	1	0	0	0	11	0	68	2
