= Sam Patterson =

American football coach

Coaching career (HC unless noted)
- 1917: Southern Illinois

Head coaching record
- Overall: 2–2

Sam Patterson was an American football coach. He was the second head football coach at Southern Illinois Normal College—now known as Southern Illinois University Carbondale—serving for one season, in 1917, and compiling a record of 2–2.

== Head coaching record ==
Year	Team	Overall	Conference	Standing	Bowl/playoffs
Southern Illinois Maroons (Illinois Intercollegiate Athletic Conference) (1917)
1917	Southern Illinois	2–2			
Southern Illinois:		2–2			
Total:		2–2			
