= 2013–14 Shrewsbury Town F.C. season =

Shrewsbury Town F.C.
2013–2014 season
- Chairman: Roland Wycherley
- Manager: Graham Turner (until 21 January 2014)'; Michael Jackson (caretaker, 22 January 2014 – 20 February 2014; appointed permanently 21 February 2014)
- League One: 23rd (relegated)
- FA Cup: First round (eliminated by Walsall)
- League Cup: First round (eliminated by Bolton Wanderers)
- Football League Trophy: First round (eliminated by Oldham Athletic)
- Top goalscorer: League: Jon Taylor (9); All: Jon Taylor (9)
- Highest home attendance: 9,510 vs Wolverhampton Wanderers; 21 September 2013
- Lowest home attendance: 1,748 vs Oldham Athletic (All) 3 September 2013; 4,039 vs Crawley Town (League) 11 March 2014
- Average home league attendance: 5,580
Home colours	Away colours

The 2013–14 season was Shrewsbury's second consecutive season back in League One after achieving a 16th-placed finish the previous season. Veteran manager Graham Turner resigned following six consecutive home defeats in January 2014, and was replaced by former player and coach Michael Jackson who could not prevent subsequent relegation to League Two.

The club also participated in the League Cup, the Football League Trophy, and the FA Cup, exiting each competition at the first-round stage.

== Season review ==
=== League Cup ===
Shrewsbury Town were knocked out of the League Cup in the first round by Bolton Wanderers who won 3–1 at New Meadow on 6 August 2013.

=== League Trophy ===
Shrewsbury Town were knocked out of the League Trophy in the first round by Oldham Athletic who won 1–4 at New Meadow on 3 September 2013.

=== FA Cup ===
Shrewsbury Town were knocked out of the FA Cup in the first round by Walsall who won 3–0 at the Bescot Stadium on 9 November 2013.

== Transfers ==
=== In ===
Date	Position	Nationality	Name	From	Fee
29 April 2013	MF	(England)	Jack Gwilliams	Trainee	Free
30 April 2013	DF	(England)	Alex McQuade	Bolton Wanderers	Free
12 June 2013	DF	(England)	Dave Winfield	Wycombe Wanderers	Free
21 June 2013	DF	(England)	Tamika Mkandawire	Millwall	Free
19 July 2013	FW	(England)	John Marsden	Stoke City	Free
23 July 2013	GK	(Wales)	Danny Coyne	Sheffield United	Free
3 December 2013	DF	(England)	Jermaine Grandison	Free Agent	Free

=== Loans in ===
Date from	Date to	Position	Nationality	Squad No.	Name	From
14 July 2013	19 August 2013	FW	(Netherlands)	19	Akwasi Asante	Birmingham City
26 July 2013	20 August 2013	DF	(England)	20	James Tavernier	Newcastle United
8 August 2013	2 October 2013	FW	(Republic of Ireland)	24	Graham Burke	Aston Villa
16 August 2013	1 January 2014	MF	(England)	23	Adam Reach	Middlesbrough
30 August 2013	2 October 2013	FW	(England)	26	Curtis Main	Middlesbrough
10 October 2013	5 November 2013	FW	(Spain)	27	Cristian López	Huddersfield
10 October 2013	6 December 2013	FW	(Northern Ireland)	20	Liam McAlinden	Wolverhampton Wanderers
25 October 2013	9 January 2014	MF	(England)	10	Nicky Wroe	Preston North End
14 November 2013	2 January 2014	FW	(England)	7	Gozie Ugwu	Reading
28 November 2013	5 January 2014	DF	(England)	19	Cameron Gayle	West Bromwich Albion
28 November 2013	3 May 2014	FW	(England)	24	Tom Eaves	Bolton Wanderers
10 January 2014	14 February 2014	MF	(Netherlands)	30	Sidney Schmeltz	Oldham Athletic
23 January 2014	23 February 2014	MF	(Scotland)	10	Fraser Fyvie	Wigan Athletic
24 January 2014	3 May 2014	FW	(Bosnia and Herzegovina)	26	Bahrudin Atajić	Celtic
30 January 2014	28 February 2014	MF	(England)	19	Nathaniel Mendez-Laing	Peterborough United
31 January 2014	3 May 2014	DF	(England)	27	Joseph Mills	Burnley
14 February 2014	14 March 2014	FW	(England)	20	Miles Storey	Swindon Town
7 March 2014	16 April 2014	MF	(England)	10	Sam Foley	Yeovil Town
17 March 2014	3 May 2014	DF	(England)	5	Dominic Iorfa	Wolverhampton Wanderers
21 March 2014	3 May 2014	FW	(England)	7	Shaun Miller	Sheffield United

=== Out ===
Date	Position	Nationality	Name	To	Fee
29 April 2013	FW	(Wales)	Ryan Doble	Free Agent	Free
29 April 2013	FW	(England)	Marvin Morgan	Plymouth Argyle	Free
29 April 2013	DF	(England)	Rob Purdie	Hereford United	Free
29 April 2013	MF	(England)	Matt Richards	Cheltenham Town	Free
29 April 2013	MF	(England)	Mark Wright	Tamworth	Free
4 July 2013	GK	(England)	Gavin Ward	Nottingham Forest	Free
13 July 2013	DF	(England)	Jermaine Grandison	Free Agent (subsequently re-joined Shrewsbury Town)	Free
6 January 2014	MF	(England)	Jack Gwilliams	Free Agent	Free
20 January 2014	DF	(Wales)	Darren Jones	AFC Wimbledon	Free
24 January 2014	FW	(England)	John Marsden	Free Agent	Free

=== Loans out ===
Date from	Date to	Position	Nationality	Name	To
3 July 2013	1 January 2014	MF	(England)	Asa Hall	Oxford United
28 November 2013	9 January 2014	DF	(England)	Connor Goldson	Cheltenham Town
28 February 2014	26 April 2014	DF	(England)	Alex McQuade	Hyde

== Competitions ==
=== Pre-season ===
9 July 2013	Shrewsbury Town	1–2	T.N.S.	Training pitch at New Meadow
	Wildig			Attendance: Behind Closed Doors

13 July 2013	Shrewsbury Town	0–3	Galatasaray	New Meadow
15:00 (GMT)			Colak; Amrabat; Sneijder

16 July 2013	Liverpool F.C. Development Squad	0–2	Shrewsbury Town	Liverpool F.C. Academy training ground
			Asante; Goldson	Attendance: Behind Closed Doors

20 July 2013	Shrewsbury Town	3–3	Bolton Wanderers	New Meadow
15:00 (GMT)	Marsden 32'; Parry 65'; Asante 77'		Sordell 19', 43'; Eagles 34'	Attendance: 1,422; Referee: P Gibbs

23 July 2013	Shrewsbury Town	4–2	Birmingham City	New Meadow
19:45 (GMT)	Taylor 8'; Bradshaw 11'; Parry 77'; Jones 81'		Green 46'; Burke 70'	Attendance: 2,037; Referee: S Atwell

27 July 2013	Shrewsbury Town	3–2	Manchester City Elite Development Squad	New Meadow
15:00 (GMT)	Wildig 29'; Bradshaw 40', 55'		Cole 31'; Rusnak 83' (pen.)	Attendance: 681; Referee: R Ellis

=== League One ===
3 August 2013 1	Shrewsbury Town	0–0	Milton Keynes Dons	New Meadow
15:00 (GMT)				Attendance: 5,144; Referee: Gary Sutton

10 August 2013 2	Leyton Orient	3–0	Shrewsbury Town	Brisbane Road
15:00 (GMT)	Mooney 57', 63'; Odubajo 90'			Attendance: 4,414; Referee: Miller

17 August 2013 3	Shrewsbury Town	2–0	Swindon Town	New Meadow
15:00 (GMT)	Reach 9'; Bradshaw 85'			Attendance: 4,943; Referee: Woolmer

24 August 2013 4	Rotherham United	2–2	Shrewsbury Town	New York Stadium
15:00 (GMT)	Revell 57'; Nardiello 69'		Taylor 20'; Bradshaw 63'	Attendance: 7,243; Referee: Whitestone

31 August 2013 5	Shrewsbury Town	1–1	Coventry City	New Meadow
15:00 (GMT)	Bradshaw 48'		Wilson 4'	Attendance: 6,541; Referee: Rushton

14 September 2013 6	Crawley Town	1–1	Shrewsbury Town	Broadfield Stadium
15:00 (GMT)	Drury 64'		Wildig 47'	Attendance: 3,202; Referee: Ward

17 September 2013 7	Bristol City	1–1	Shrewsbury Town	Ashton Gate Stadium
19:45 (GMT)	Emmanuel-Thomas 85'		Taylor 28'	Attendance: 10,143; Referee: Robinson

21 September 2013 8	Shrewsbury Town	0–1	Wolverhampton Wanderers	New Meadow
13:00 (GMT)			Sako 84' (pen.)	Attendance: 9,510; Referee: Gibbs

28 September 2013 9	Bradford City	2–1	Shrewsbury Town	Valley Parade
15:00 (GMT)	Reid 60'; Hanson 90'		Bradshaw 2'	Attendance: 14,128; Referee: Eltrincham

5 October 2013 10	Shrewsbury Town	2–2	Carlisle United	New Meadow
15:00 (GMT)	Bradshaw 40'; Parry 90'		Amoo 87'; O'Hanlon 90'	Attendance: 5,215; Referee: Madley

12 October 2013 11	Shrewsbury Town	2–0	Gillingham	New Meadow
15:00 (GMT)	Jacobson 17'; McAlinden 81'			Attendance: 5,129; Referee: Salisbury

19 October 2013 12	Peterborough United	1–0	Shrewsbury Town	London Road
15:00 (GMT)	Mendez-Laing 64'			Attendance: 6,956; Referee: Ilderton

22 October 2013 13	Shrewsbury Town	1–1	Colchester United	New Meadow
19:45 (GMT)	Cristian 4'		Bean 44'	Attendance: 4,364; Referee: Drysdale

26 October 2013 14	Brentford	1–0	Shrewsbury Town	Griffin Park
15:00 (GMT)	Trotta 16'			Attendance: 9,783; Referee: Stroud

2 November 2013 15	Shrewsbury Town	2–0	Sheffield United	New Meadow
15:00 (GMT)	Jacobson 39'; McAlinden 80'			Attendance: 6,226; Referee: Attwell

16 November 2013 16	Port Vale	3–1	Shrewsbury Town	Vale Park
15:00 (GMT)	Robertson 23'; Myrie-Williams 30'; Hugill 90'		McAlinden 59'	Attendance: 6,547; Referee: Boyeson

23 November 2013 17	Shrewsbury Town	1–0	Notts County	New Meadow
15:00 (GMT)	Reach 73'			Attendance: 5,008; Referee: Bond

26 November 2013 18	Shrewsbury Town	1–2	Oldham Athletic	New Meadow
19:45 (GMT)	Ugwu 16'		MacDonald 44'; Philliskirk 76'	Attendance: 4,563; Referee: Adcock

30 November 2013 19	Stevenage	1–3	Shrewsbury Town	Lamex Stadium
15:00 (GMT)	Zoko 24'		Reach 35'; Eaves 38'; Jacobson 51'	Attendance: 2,675; Referee: Berry

14 December 2013 20	Shrewsbury Town	0–1	Walsall	New Meadow
15:00 (GMT)			Lalkovic 54'	Attendance: 6,015; Referee: Phillips

21 December 2013 21	Crewe Alexandra	1–1	Shrewsbury Town	Gresty Road
15:00 (GMT)	Hitchcock 21'		Taylor 56'	Attendance: 4,801; Referee: Malone

26 December 2013 22	Shrewsbury Town	0–1	Tranmere Rovers	New Meadow
15:00 (GMT)			Robinson 45'	Attendance: 6,056; Referee: Woolmer

29 December 2013 23	Shrewsbury Town	0–1	Preston North End	New Meadow
15:00 (GMT)			Woods 80' (o.g.)	Attendance: 6,379; Referee: Haywood

1 January 2014 24	Oldham Athletic	1–2	Shrewsbury Town	Boundary Park
15:00 (GMT)	Grounds 35'		Taylor 23'; Wildig 62'	Attendance: 3,669; Referee: Duncan

7 January 2014 25	Shrewsbury Town	0–2	Leyton Orient	New Meadow
19:45 (GMT)			Odubajo 28'; Cuthbert 87'	Attendance: 4,194; Referee: Mathieson

11 January 2014 26	Milton Keynes Dons	3–2	Shrewsbury Town	Stadium mk
15:00 (GMT)	Alli 4'; Long 21'; Bowditch 75'		Woods 7'; Joe Jacobson 86'	Attendance: 7,408; Referee: Bull

18 January 2014 27	Shrewsbury Town	0–3	Rotherham United	New Meadow
15:00 (GMT)			Hitchcock 10'; Pringle 18'; James Tavernier 21'	Attendance: 5,116; Referee: Simpson

25 January 2014 28	Swindon Town	3–1	Shrewsbury Town	County Ground
15:00 (GMT)	Smith 30', 90'; Ranger 89'		Parry 45'	Attendance: 7,448; Referee: Kettle

1 February 2014 29	Shrewsbury Town	1–1	Brentford	New Meadow
15:00 (GMT)	Eaves 90'		Trotta 68' (pen.)	Attendance: 4,927; Referee: Heywood

8 February 2014 30	Sheffield United	2–0	Shrewsbury Town	Bramall Lane
15:00 (GMT)	Flynn 11'; Scougall 17'			Attendance: 15,987; Referee: Haines

15 February 2014 31	Shrewsbury Town	0–0	Port Vale	New Meadow
13:00 (GMT)				Attendance: 5,992; Referee: Adcock

22 February 2014 32	Notts County	2–3	Shrewsbury Town	Meadow Lane
15:00 (GMT)	Grealish 8'; Sheehan 13'		Taylor 32', 67'; McAllister 70'	Attendance: 5,424; Referee: Stockbridge

2 March 2014 33	Coventry City	0–0	Shrewsbury Town	Sixfields, Northampton
15:00 (GMT)				Attendance: 1,966; Referee: Deadman

8 March 2014 34	Shrewsbury Town	2–3	Bristol City	New Meadow
15:00 (GMT)	Mkandawire 41'; Parry 60'		Emmanuel-Thomas 18'; Mkandawire 55' (o.g.); Bryan 63'	Attendance: 6,069; Referee: Horwood

11 March 2014 35	Shrewsbury Town	1–1	Crawley Town	New Meadow
15:00 (GMT)	Parry 56'		Simpson 24'	Attendance: 4,039; Referee: Tierney

15 March 2014 36	Wolverhampton Wanderers	0–0	Shrewsbury Town	Molineux
15:00 (GMT)				Attendance: 24,012; Referee: Madley

18 March 2014 37	Colchester United	1–0	Shrewsbury Town	Colchester Community Stadium
19:45 (GMT)	Ibehre 56'			Attendance: 2,508; Referee: Sutton

22 March 2014 38	Shrewsbury Town	2–1	Bradford City	New Meadow
15:00 (GMT)	Taylor 80'; Miller 90'		Davies 79'	Attendance: 5,181; Referee: Sheldrake

25 March 2014 39	Carlisle United	0–0	Shrewsbury Town	Brunton Park
19:45 (GMT)				Attendance: 3,963; Referee: Rushton

29 March 2014 40	Walsall	1–0	Shrewsbury Town	Bescot Stadium
15:00 (GMT)	Westcarr 5'			Attendance: 4,222; Referee: Madley

5 April 2014 41	Shrewsbury Town	1–0	Stevenage	New Meadow
15:00 (GMT)	Taylor 57'			Attendance: 5,178; Referee: Clark

12 April 2014 41	Tranmere Rovers	2–1	Shrewsbury Town	Prenton Park
15:07 (GMT)	Power 19'; Brown 85'		Parry 73'	Attendance: 5,698; Referee: Phillips

18 April 2014 43	Shrewsbury Town	1–3	Crewe Alexandra	New Meadow
15:00 (GMT)	Bradshaw 90'		Pogba 38'; Ikpeazu 51'; Grant 89'	Attendance: 6,947; Referee: Ward

21 April 2014 44	Preston North End	5–2	Shrewsbury Town	Deepdale
15:00 (GMT)	Holmes 34'; Wright 40'; Gallagher 58', 62' (pen.), 81'		Miller 43'; Summerfield 78'	Attendance: 9,636; Referee: Miller

26 April 2014 45	Shrewsbury Town	2–4	Peterborough United	New Meadow
15:00 (GMT)	Taylor 6'; Bradshaw 45'		Washington 13', 21'; Isgrove 28'; McQuoid 90'	Attendance: 5,619; Referee: Bull

3 May 2014 46	Gillingham	1–1	Shrewsbury Town	Priestfield Stadium
15:00 (GMT)	Barrett 72'		Miller 86'	Attendance: 7,634; Referee: Drysdale

==== League table ====
Pos	Team	Pld	W	D	L	GF	GA	GD	Pts	Promotion, qualification or relegation
20	Notts County	46	15	5	26	64	77	−13	50	
21	Tranmere Rovers (R)	46	12	11	23	52	79	−27	47	Relegation to Football League Two
22	Carlisle United (R)	46	11	12	23	43	76	−33	45	Relegation to Football League Two
23	Shrewsbury Town (R)	46	9	15	22	44	65	−21	42	Relegation to Football League Two
24	Stevenage (R)	46	11	9	26	46	72	−26	42	Relegation to Football League Two

Updated to match(es) played on 3 May 2014. Source: BBC Sport
Rules for classification: 1) Points; 2) Goal difference; 3) Number of goals scored
(R) Relegated

=== League Cup ===
6 August 2013 1	Shrewsbury Town	1–3	Bolton Wanderers	New Meadow
19:45 (GMT)	Wildig 29'		Hall 26'; Odelusi 43', 52'	Attendance: 3,456; Referee: Bratt

=== League Trophy ===
3 September 2013 1	Shrewsbury Town	1–4	Oldham Athletic	New Meadow
19:30 (GMT)	Burke 45'		Philliskirk 9', 26'; Rooney 42'; Schmeltz 76'	Attendance: 1,748; Referee: Stockbridge

=== FA Cup ===
9 November 2013 1	Walsall	3–0	Shrewsbury Town	Bescot Stadium
15:00 (GMT)	Westcarr 29', 59'; Sawyers 73'			Attendance: 3,004; Referee: Breakspear

== Squad statistics ==
=== Appearances and goals ===
Updated 3 May 2014

No.	Pos	Nat	Player	Total		League		FA Cup		League Cup		Football League Trophy	
No.	Pos	Nat	Player	Apps	Goals	Apps	Goals	Apps	Goals	Apps	Goals	Apps	Goals
1	GK	(England) ENG	Chris Weale	36	0	34+0	0	1+0	0	1+0	0	0+0	0
2	DF	(England) ENG	Jermaine Grandison	14	0	6+8	0	0+0	0	0+0	0	0+0	0
3	DF	(Wales) WAL	Joe Jacobson	43	4	40+1	4	0+0	0	1+0	0	1+0	0
4	MF	(England) ENG	Luke Summerfield	31	1	24+4	1	1+0	0	1+0	0	0+1	0
5	DF	(England) ENG	Dominic Iorfa	7	0	6+1	0	0+0	0	0+0	0	0+0	0
6	DF	(England) ENG	Dave Winfield	18	0	15+2	0	1+0	0	0+0	0	0+0	0
7	FW	(England) ENG	Shaun Miller	8	3	5+3	3	0+0	0	0+0	0	0+0	0
8	MF	(Ireland) EIR	Dave McAllister	29	1	16+10	1	0+1	0	0+1	0	1+0	0
9	FW	(Wales) WAL	Tom Bradshaw	30	7	17+11	7	1+0	0	1+0	0	0+0	0
11	MF	(England) ENG	Jon Taylor	44	9	36+5	9	1+0	0	1+0	0	1+0	0
12	DF	(England) ENG	Alex McQuade	2	0	0+1	0	0+0	0	0+1	0	0+0	0
15	MF	(England) ENG	Aaron Wildig	33	3	27+3	2	1+0	0	1+0	1	1+0	0
16	DF	(England) ENG	Tamika Mkandawire	42	1	38+1	1	1+0	0	1+0	0	1+0	0
17	MF	(Wales) WAL	Paul Parry	42	5	31+8	5	0+1	0	1+0	0	0+1	0
18	DF	(England) ENG	Connor Goldson	39	0	30+6	0	1+0	0	0+1	0	1+0	0
21	GK	(Wales) WAL	Danny Coyne	0	0	0+0	0	0+0	0	0+0	0	0+0	0
22	MF	(England) ENG	Ryan Woods	43	1	37+4	1	1+0	0	0+0	0	1+0	0
24	FW	(England) ENG	Tom Eaves	25	2	20+5	2	0+0	0	0+0	0	0+0	0
25	GK	(England) ENG	Joe Anyon	12	0	11+0	0	0+0	0	0+0	0	1+0	0
26	FW	(Bosnia and Herzegovina) BIH	Bahrudin Atajić	13	0	4+9	0	0+0	0	0+0	0	0+0	0
27	DF	(England) ENG	Joseph Mills	13	0	12+1	0	0+0	0	0+0	0	0+0	0
29	MF	(England) ENG	Asa Hall	17	0	14+3	0	0+0	0	0+0	0	0+0	0
31	DF	(Wales) WAL	Dominic Smith	0	0	0+0	0	0+0	0	0+0	0	0+0	0
32	FW	(England) ENG	Kaiman Anderson	0	0	0+0	0	0+0	0	0+0	0	0+0	0
33	MF	(England) ENG	Niall Flint	0	0	0+0	0	0+0	0	0+0	0	0+0	0
34	MF	(England) ENG	Alex Fletcher	0	0	0+0	0	0+0	0	0+0	0	0+0	0
35	MF	(England) ENG	Josh Ginnelly	0	0	0+0	0	0+0	0	0+0	0	0+0	0
Players away from the club on loan:
Players who appeared for Shrewsbury who left the club before the end of the season:
5	DF	(Wales) WAL	Darren Jones	17	0	14+1	0	0+0	0	1+0	0	0+1	0
7	FW	(England) ENG	Gozie Ugwu	7	1	7+0	1	0+0	0	0+0	0	0+0	0
10	MF	(England) ENG	Nicky Wroe	11	0	7+3	0	1+0	0	0+0	0	0+0	0
10	MF	(Scotland) SCO	Fraser Fyvie	4	0	4+0	0	0+0	0	0+0	0	0+0	0
10	MF	(England) ENG	Sam Foley	9	0	6+3	0	0+0	0	0+0	0	0+0	0
14	FW	(England) ENG	John Marsden	5	0	1+2	0	0+1	0	1+0	0	0+0	0
19	FW	(Netherlands) NED	Akwasi Asante	1	0	1+0	0	0+0	0	0+0	0	0+0	0
19	DF	(England) ENG	Cameron Gayle	3	0	2+1	0	0+0	0	0+0	0	0+0	0
20	DF	(England) ENG	James Tavernier	2	0	1+0	0	0+0	0	1+0	0	0+0	0
20	FW	(Ireland) EIR	Liam McAlinden	9	3	5+4	3	0+0	0	0+0	0	0+0	0
20	FW	(England) ENG	Miles Storey	6	0	4+2	0	0+0	0	0+0	0	0+0	0
23	MF	(England) ENG	Adam Reach	24	3	17+5	3	1+0	0	0+0	0	1+0	0
24	FW	(Ireland) EIR	Graham Burke	4	1	1+2	0	0+0	0	0+0	0	1+0	1
26	FW	(England) ENG	Curtis Main	6	0	4+1	0	0+0	0	0+0	0	1+0	0
27	FW	(Spain) ESP	Cristian López	5	1	4+1	1	0+0	0	0+0	0	0+0	0
28	MF	(England) ENG	Jack Gwilliams	0	0	0+0	0	0+0	0	0+0	0	0+0	0
30	MF	(Netherlands) NED	Sidney Schmeltz	4	0	2+2	0	0+0	0	0+0	0	0+0	0

=== Top scorers ===
Place	Position	Nation	Number	Name	League One	FA Cup	League Cup	Football League Trophy	Total
1	MF	(England)	11	Jon Taylor	9	0	0	0	9
2	FW	(Wales)	9	Tom Bradshaw	7	0	0	0	7
3	MF	(Wales)	17	Paul Parry	5	0	0	0	5
4	DF	(Wales)	3	Joe Jacobson	4	0	0	0	4
5	FW	(England)	7	Shaun Miller	3	0	0	0	3
5	MF	(England)	23	Adam Reach *	3	0	0	0	3
5	FW	(Northern Ireland)	20	Liam McAlinden *	3	0	0	0	3
5	MF	(England)	15	Aaron Wildig	2	0	1	0	3
6	FW	(England)	24	Tom Eaves	2	0	0	0	2
7	MF	(England)	4	Luke Summerfield	1	0	0	0	1
7	DF	(England)	16	Tamika Mkandawire	1	0	0	0	1
7	MF	(Republic of Ireland)	8	Dave McAllister	1	0	0	0	1
7	MF	(England)	22	Ryan Woods	1	0	0	0	1
7	FW	(England)	7	Gozie Ugwu *	1	0	0	0	1
7	FW	(Spain)	27	Cristian López *	1	0	0	0	1
7	FW	(Republic of Ireland)	24	Graham Burke *	0	0	0	1	1

Updated 3 May 2014

- indicates player left club before end of season

=== Assists ===
Place	Position	Nation	Number	Name	League One	FA Cup	League Cup	Football League Trophy	Total
1	MF	(England)	4	Luke Summerfield	5	0	0	0	5
1	MF	(Wales)	17	Paul Parry	4	0	1	0	5
2	FW	(England)	24	Tom Eaves	4	0	0	0	4
3	MF	(England)	22	Ryan Woods	3	0	0	0	3
3	MF	(England)	11	Jon Taylor	2	0	0	1	3
4	DF	(Wales)	3	Joe Jacobson	2	0	0	0	2
4	DF	(Wales)	5	Darren Jones *	2	0	0	0	2
4	MF	(England)	23	Adam Reach *	2	0	0	0	2
4	FW	(England)	26	Curtis Main *	2	0	0	0	2
5	DF	(England)	5	Dominic Iorfa	1	0	0	0	1
5	DF	(England)	2	Jermaine Grandison	1	0	0	0	1
5	MF	(Republic of Ireland)	8	Dave McAllister	1	0	0	0	1
5	FW	(England)	15	Aaron Wildig	1	0	0	0	1
5	FW	(England)	29	Asa Hall	1	0	0	0	1
5	FW	(England)	7	Gozie Ugwu*	1	0	0	0	1
5	DF	(England)	18	Connor Goldson	1	0	0	0	1
5	MF	(England)	10	Nicky Wroe*	1	0	0	0	1
5	FW	(Wales)	9	Tom Bradshaw	1	0	0	0	1

Updated 3 May 2014

- indicates player left club before end of season

Referenced from Shrewsbury Town match highlights and match reports.

=== Disciplinary record ===
No.	Nat.	Pos.	Name	League One		FA Cup		EFL Cup		EFL Trophy		Total	
No.	Nat.	Pos.	Name	Yellow card	Red card	Yellow card	Red card	Yellow card	Red card	Yellow card	Red card	Yellow card	Red card
1	(England)	GK	Chris Weale	3	0	0	0	0	0	0	0	3	0
3	(England)	DF	Jermaine Grandison	1	0	0	0	0	0	0	0	1	0
3	(Wales)	DF	Joe Jacobson	6	0	0	0	0	0	0	0	6	0
4	(England)	MF	Luke Summerfield	1	0	0	0	0	0	0	0	1	0
5	(England)	DF	Dominic Iorfa	1	0	0	0	0	0	0	0	1	0
6	(England)	DF	Dave Winfield	2	1	0	0	0	0	0	0	1	1
7	(England)	FW	Shaun Miller	2	0	0	0	0	0	0	0	2	0
8	(Republic of Ireland)	MF	Dave McAllister	2	0	0	0	0	0	0	0	2	0
9	(Wales)	FW	Tom Bradshaw	1	0	0	0	0	0	0	0	1	0
11	(England)	MF	Jon Taylor	3	1	0	0	0	0	0	0	3	1
15	(England)	MF	Aaron Wildig	3	0	1	0	0	0	0	0	4	0
16	(England)	DF	Tamika Mkandawire	3	0	0	0	0	0	0	0	3	0
18	(England)	DF	Connor Goldson	3	0	0	0	0	0	0	0	3	0
19	(England)	MF	Nathaniel Mendez-Laing	1	0	0	0	0	0	0	0	1	0
22	(England)	MF	Ryan Woods	5	0	0	0	0	0	0	0	5	0
23	(England)	MF	Adam Reach *	3	0	0	0	0	0	0	0	3	0
24	(England)	FW	Tom Eaves	1	0	0	0	0	0	0	0	1	0
26	(England)	FW	Curtis Main *	2	0	0	0	0	0	0	0	2	0
27	(England)	DF	Joseph Mills	1	1	0	0	0	0	0	0	1	1
29	(England)	MF	Asa Hall	1	1	0	0	0	0	0	0	1	1

Updated 3 May 2014

- indicates player left club before end of season

=== International Call-ups ===
Date	Position	Name	Country	Minutes Played	Goals Scored	Opposition
1 May 2013	DF	Dominic Smith	Wales U19s	15	0	Northern Ireland U19s
14 August 2013	FW	Graham Burke *	Republic of Ireland U21s	0	0	Faroe Islands U21s
6 September 2013	FW	Tom Bradshaw	Wales U21s	33	0	San Marino U21s
9 September 2013	FW	Graham Burke *	Republic of Ireland U21s	8	0	Germany U21s
10 September 2013	FW	Tom Bradshaw	Wales U21s	10	0	Moldova U21s
15 November 2013	DF	Dominic Smith	Wales U19s	90	0	Netherlands U19s
18 November 2013	DF	Dominic Smith	Wales U19s	90	0	Moldova U19s
22 April 2014	DF	Dominic Smith	Wales U19s	90	0	Montenegro U19s
24 April 2014	DF	Dominic Smith	Wales U19s	90	0	Montenegro U19s

Updated 27 April 2014

- indicates player left club before end of season
