= 2011–12 Shrewsbury Town F.C. season =

Shrewsbury Town F.C.
2011–12 season
- Chairman: Roland Wycherley
- Manager: Graham Turner
- League Two: 2nd (promoted)
- FA Cup: 3rd round
- League Cup: 3rd round
- Football League Trophy: 1st Round (North West)
- Top goalscorer: League: James Collins (14); All: James Collins (16)
- Highest home attendance: League: 9,441 vs Dagenham & Redbridge (28 April 2012); All: 9,441 vs Dagenham & Redbridge (28 April 2012)
- Lowest home attendance: League: 4,871 vs Macclesfield Town (17 December 2011); All: 4,048 vs Rotherham United (3 December 2011)
- Average home league attendance: 5,769
Home colours	Away colours

The 2011–12 season was the 126th season played by Shrewsbury Town F.C., an association football club based in Shrewsbury, Shropshire, England. Shrewsbury competed in League Two, whilst also participating in the FA Cup, the Football League Cup and the Football League Trophy.

== League table ==
Pos	Team	Pld	W	D	L	GF	GA	GD	Pts	Promotion, qualification or relegation
1	Swindon Town (C, P)	46	29	6	11	75	32	+43	93	Promotion to Football League One
2	Shrewsbury Town (P)	46	26	10	10	66	41	+25	88	Promotion to Football League One
3	Crawley Town (P)	46	23	15	8	76	54	+22	84	Promotion to Football League One
4	Southend United	46	25	8	13	77	48	+29	83	Qualification for League Two play-offs (Note: Four teams play for one spot and promotion to Football League One.)
5	Torquay United	46	23	12	11	63	50	+13	81	Qualification for League Two play-offs

Updated to match(es) played on 5 May 2012. Source: BBC Sport
Rules for classification: 1) Points; 2) Goal difference; 3) Number of goals scored
(C) Champions; (P) Promoted

== Squad statistics ==
=== Appearances and goals ===
No.	Pos	Nat	Player	Total		League Two		FA Cup		League Cup		FL Trophy	
No.	Pos	Nat	Player	Apps	Goals	Apps	Goals	Apps	Goals	Apps	Goals	Apps	Goals
1	GK	(England) ENG	Chris Neal	39	0	35+0	0	3+0	0	0+0	0	1+0	0
2	DF	(England) ENG	Jermaine Grandison	43	2	36+2	2	1+0	0	2+1	0	1+0	0
3	DF	(Wales) WAL	Joe Jacobson	45	1	37+2	1	3+0	0	2+0	0	1+0	0
4	MF	(England) ENG	Sean McAllister	22	1	14+3	1	2+0	0	2+0	0	1+0	0
5	DF	(England) ENG	Ian Sharps	48	2	43+0	1	3+0	1	2+0	0	0+0	0
6	DF	(Australia) AUS	Shane Cansdell-Sherriff	43	4	35+2	4	3+0	0	2+0	0	1+0	0
7	MF	(England) ENG	Mark Wright	53	11	45+1	10	3+0	0	3+0	1	0+1	0
8	MF	(England) ENG	Nicky Wroe	44	5	32+6	4	1+1	0	3+0	1	0+1	0
9	FW	(Ireland) EIR	James Collins	47	17	32+10	14	0+2	1	2+1	2	0+0	0
10	FW	(England) ENG	Marvin Morgan	49	11	26+16	8	3+0	0	3+0	3	0+1	0
12	DF	(England) ENG	Reuben Hazell	10	0	5+2	0	0+0	0	2+0	0	1+0	0
14	MF	(England) ENG	Matt Richards	48	5	35+7	5	3+0	0	1+1	0	1+0	0
15	DF	(England) ENG	Carl Regan	15	0	12+1	0	0+0	0	1+0	0	1+0	0
16	MF	(England) ENG	Lionel Ainsworth	27	2	19+2	2	2+0	0	3+0	0	1+0	0
17	FW	(Wales) WAL	Tom Bradshaw	10	1	5+3	1	0+0	0	0+1	0	1+0	0
18	DF	(England) ENG	Connor Goldson	7	0	2+2	0	0+1	0	1+1	0	0+0	0
20	MF	(Wales) WAL	Aaron Wildig	13	1	10+2	1	1+0	0	0+0	0	0+0	0
23	MF	(England) ENG	Jon Taylor	36	0	15+18	0	0+2	0	0+1	0	0+0	0
24	FW	(England) ENG	Terry Gornell	47	8	28+13	7	3+0	1	1+1	0	1+0	0
25	GK	(England) ENG	Ben Smith	14	0	11+0	0	0+0	0	3+0	0	0+0	0
Players featured for Shrewsbury but left before the end of the season:
11	MF	(Scotland) SCO	Steven Leslie	1	0	0+0	0	0+0	0	0+0	0	1+0	0
Players on loan to Shrewsbury who returned to their parent club:
19	MF	(Ireland) EIR	David McAllister	15	0	15+0	0	0+0	0	0+0	0	0+0	0
19	MF	(England) ENG	James Wallace	3	0	1+2	0	0+0	0	0+0	0	0+0	0
21	DF	(Northern Ireland) NIR	Conor McLaughlin	4	0	4+0	0	0+0	0	0+0	0	0+0	0
26	FW	(Saint Kitts and Nevis) SKN	Romaine Sawyers	9	0	2+5	0	0+0	0	2+0	0	0+0	0
26	DF	(England) ENG	James Hurst	11	0	7+0	0	2+0	0	2+0	0	0+0	0

=== Top scorers ===
Place	Position	Nation	Number	Name	League Two	FA Cup	League Cup	FL Trophy	Total
1	FW	(Republic of Ireland)	9	James Collins	14	0	3	0	16
2	MF	(England)	7	Mark Wright	10	0	1	0	11
=	FW	(England)	10	Marvin Morgan	8	0	3	0	11
4	FW	(England)	24	Terry Gornell	7	1	0	0	8
5	MF	(England)	8	Nicky Wroe	4	1	1	0	6
6	MF	(England)	14	Matt Richards	5	0	0	0	5
7	DF	(Australia)	6	Shane Cansdell-Sherriff	4	0	0	0	4
8	MF	(England)	16	Lionel Ainsworth	2	0	0	0	2
=	DF	(England)	2	Jermaine Grandison	2	0	0	0	2
=	DF	(England)	5	Ian Sharps	1	1	0	0	2
11	MF	(England)	4	Sean McAllister	1	0	0	0	1
=	FW	(Wales)	17	Tom Bradshaw	1	0	0	0	1
=	MF	(Wales)	20	Aaron Wildig	1	0	0	0	1
=	DF	(Wales)	3	Joe Jacobson	1	0	0	0	1
				TOTALS	64	3	7	0	74

=== Disciplinary record ===
Number	Nation	Position	Name	League Two		FA Cup		League Cup		FL Trophy		Total	
Number	Nation	Position	Name	Yellow card	Red card	Yellow card	Red card	Yellow card	Red card	Yellow card	Red card	Yellow card	Red card
10	(England)	FW	Marvin Morgan	6	1	1	0	0	0	0	0	7	1
2	(England)	DF	Jermaine Grandison	6	0	0	0	0	0	0	0	6	0
9	(Republic of Ireland)	FW	James Collins	6	0	0	0	0	0	0	0	6	0
14	(England)	MF	Matt Richards	4	0	1	0	0	0	0	0	5	0
5	(England)	DF	Ian Sharps	5	0	0	0	0	0	0	0	5	0
8	(England)	MF	Nicky Wroe	4	0	0	0	0	0	0	0	4	0
3	(Wales)	DF	Joe Jacobson	4	0	0	0	0	0	0	0	4	0
24	(England)	FW	Terry Gornell	3	1	0	0	0	0	0	0	3	1
4	(England)	MF	Sean McAllister	2	1	0	0	1	0	0	0	3	1
26	(England)	DF	James Hurst	2	0	1	0	0	0	0	0	3	0
1	(England)	GK	Chris Neal	3	0	0	0	0	0	0	0	3	0
21	(Northern Ireland)	DF	Conor McLaughlin	3	0	0	0	0	0	0	0	3	0
6	(Australia)	DF	Shane Cansdell-Sherriff	3	0	0	0	0	0	0	0	3	0
23	(England)	MF	Jon Taylor	2	1	0	0	0	0	0	0	2	1
12	(England)	DF	Reuben Hazell	2	0	0	0	0	0	0	0	2	0
16	(England)	MF	Lionel Ainsworth	1	0	0	0	0	0	0	0	1	0
7	(England)	MF	Mark Wright	1	0	0	0	0	0	0	0	1	0
25	(England)	GK	Ben Smith	1	0	0	0	0	0	0	0	1	0
20	(Wales)	MF	Aaron Wildig	1	0	0	0	0	0	0	0	1	0
19	(England)	MF	James Wallace	0	1	0	0	0	0	0	0	0	1
			TOTALS	59	5	3	0	1	0	0	0	63	5

== Results ==
=== Pre-season friendlies ===
11 July 2011	The New Saints	2–1	Shrewsbury Town	Park Hall
19:45	Williams 37'; Proctor 82'		Cork 39'	Attendance: 496

17 July 2011	Shrewsbury Town	2–1	Manchester United B	Greenhous Meadow
15:00	Collins 11'; McAllister 30'		Drinkwater 49'	Attendance: 2,492

22 July 2011	Shrewsbury Town	2–0	Wolves Development XI	Greenhous Meadow
19:30	Cansdell-Sherriff 56'; Morgan 80'			Attendance: 1,971

26 July 2011	Kidderminster Harriers	2–1	Shrewsbury Town	Aggborough
19:45	Vaughan (?); Matt 89'		Ainsworth 74'	Attendance: 753

29 July 2011	Shrewsbury Town	0–2	Tranmere Rovers	Greenhous Meadow
19:30			Akins 11'; Weir 58'	Attendance: 1,047

=== League Two ===
6 August 2011 1	Shrewsbury Town	1–1	Plymouth Argyle	Greenhous Meadow
15:00	Collins 69'		Fletcher 90'	Attendance: 6,421

13 August 2011 2	Burton Albion	1–1	Shrewsbury Town	Pirelli Stadium
15:00	Zola 14'		Gornell 83'	Attendance: 2,989

16 August 2011 3	Oxford United	2–0	Shrewsbury Town	Kassam Stadium
19:45	Heslop 8'; Guy 52'			Attendance: 6,102

20 August 2011 4	Shrewsbury Town	2–0	Crewe Alexandra	Greenhous Meadow
15:00	McAllister 23'; Wroe 90+1'			Attendance: 5,050

27 August 2011 5	Shrewsbury Town	2–1	Swindon Town	Greenhous Meadow
15:00	Gornell 57'; Morgan 71'		Ritchie 25'	Attendance: 5,323

3 September 2011 6	Gillingham	0–1	Shrewsbury Town	MEMS Priestfield Stadium
15:00			Wroe 90+4' (pen.)	Attendance: 4,869

10 September 2011 7	Shrewsbury Town	3–1	Hereford United	Greenhous Meadow
13:00	Morgan 7', 79'; Wright 48'		Barkhuizen 73'	Attendance: 5,684

13 September 2011 8	Bristol Rovers	1–0	Shrewsbury Town	Memorial Stadium
19:45	Zebroski 19'			Attendance: 5,065

17 September 2011 9	Port Vale	2–3	Shrewsbury Town	Vale Park
13:00	Williamson 26', 81'		Morgan 3'; Wright 14'; Ainsworth 50'	Attendance: 5,541

24 September 2011 10	Shrewsbury Town	2–0	Torquay United	Greenhous Meadow
15:00	Collins 6', 49'			Attendance: 5,263

30 September 2011 11	Southend United	3–0	Shrewsbury Town	Roots Hall
19:45	Dickinson 27' (pen.); Phillips 90+1'; Harris 90+5' (pen.)			Attendance: 6,394

8 October 2011 12	Shrewsbury Town	3–2	Barnet	Greenhous Meadow
15:00	Richards 31'; Gornell 42'; Ainsworth 90+3'		Holmes 69'; Marshall 82'	Attendance: 5,192

15 October 2011 13	Crawley Town	2–1	Shrewsbury Town	Broadfield Stadium
15:00	Torres 14'; Howell 43'		Wright 72'	Attendance: 3,453

22 October 2011 14	Rotherham United	1–1	Shrewsbury Town	Don Valley Stadium
15:00	Grabban 22'		Cansdell-Sheriff 45'	Attendance: 3,561

25 October 2011 15	Shrewsbury Town	1–0	Accrington Stanley	Greenhous Meadow
19:45	Bradshaw 28'			Attendance: 5,076

29 October 2011 16	Shrewsbury Town	0–0	AFC Wimbledon	Greenhous Meadow
15:00				Attendance: 5,861

5 November 2011 17	Dagenham & Redbridge	0–2	Shrewsbury Town	Victoria Road
15:00			Gornell 6'; Collins 90+5' (pen.)	Attendance: 1,726

19 November 2011 18	Northampton Town	2–7	Shrewsbury Town	Sixfields Stadium
15:00	Tozer 49'; Akinfenwa 85'		Wright 18', 40'; Gornell 44'; Morgan 82'; Collins 88'; Jacobson 90+4'; Langmead 90+6' (o.g.)	Attendance: 5,039

26 November 2011 19	Shrewsbury Town	2–0	Morecambe	Greenhous Meadow
15:00	Wroe 39' (pen.); Wright 88'			Attendance: 5,623

10 December 2011 20	Aldershot Town	1–0	Shrewsbury Town	Recreation Ground
15:00	Guttridge 67'			Attendance: 2,384

17 December 2011 21	Shrewsbury Town	1–0	Macclesfield Town	Greenhous Meadow
15:00	Cansdell Sheriff 49'			Attendance: 4,871

26 December 2011 22	Cheltenham Town	0–0	Shrewsbury Town	Abbey Business Stadium
15:00				Attendance: 5,004

31 December 2011 23	Bradford City	3–1	Shrewsbury Town	Coral Windows Stadium
15:00	Hanson 24'; Wells 29'; Fagan 49'		Morgan 78'	Attendance: 10,567

2 January 2012 24	Shrewsbury Town	1–1	Northampton Town	Greenhous Meadow
15:00	Richards 34'		Berahino 22'	Attendance: 6,045

14 January 2012 25	Shrewsbury Town	2–0	Gillingham	Greenhous Meadow
15:00	Cansdell-Sherriff 30'; Wright 87'			Attendance: 4,940

21 January 2012 26	Shrewsbury Town	2–1	Southend United	Greenhous Meadow
15:00	Collins 53'; Grandison 82'		Hall 66'	Attendance: 5,601

28 January 2012 27	Hereford United	0–2	Shrewsbury Town	Edgar Street
13:00			Gornell 16'; Collins 27'	Attendance: 3,515

11 February 2012 28	Torquay United	1–0	Shrewsbury Town	Plainmoor
15:00	Atieno 68'			Attendance: 2,592

14 February 2012 29	Shrewsbury Town	1–0	Bristol Rovers	Greenhous Meadow
19:45	Collins 86'			Attendance: 4,928

18 February 2012 30	Barnet	1–2	Shrewsbury Town	Underhill Stadium
15:00	McLeod 48'		Kamdjo 45+1' (o.g.); Collins 74'	Attendance: 2,046

21 February 2012 31	Swindon Town	2–1	Shrewsbury Town	County Ground
19:45	Connell 64' 76'		Richards 40'	Attendance: 7,990

27 February 2012 32	Shrewsbury Town	2–1	Crawley Town	Greenhous Meadow
19:45	Wright 44'; Morgan 74'		Akinde 33'	Attendance: 5,229

3 March 2012 33	Crewe Alexandra	1–1	Shrewsbury Town	Alexandra Stadium
15:00	Powell 22'		Collins 5'	Attendance: 5,086

6 March 2012 34	Shrewsbury Town	2–2	Oxford United	Greenhous Meadow
19:45	Wright 54'; Richards 90+4'		Holmes 1' 38'	Attendance: 5,205

10 March 2012 35	Shrewsbury Town	1–0	Burton Albion	Greenhous Meadow
15:00	Sharps 51'			Attendance: 5,840

17 March 2012 36	Plymouth Argyle	1–0	Shrewsbury Town	Home Park
15:00	Wotton 21'			Attendance: 5,931

20 March 2012 37	Shrewsbury Town	2–0	Cheltenham Town	Greenhous Meadow
19:45	Wroe 1'; Gornell 57'			Attendance: 5,705

24 March 2012 38	Morecambe	0–1	Shrewsbury Town	Globe Arena
15:00			Collins 68'	Attendance: 2,175

31 March 2012 39	Shrewsbury Town	1–1	Aldershot Town	Greenhous Meadow
15:00	Morgan 78'		Payne 51' (pen.)	Attendance: 5,588

6 April 2012 40	Macclesfield Town	1–3	Shrewsbury Town	Moss Rose
19:45	Arnaud Mendy 85'		Collins 33' 86'; Wright 83'	Attendance: 3,403

9 April 2012 41	Shrewsbury Town	1–0	Bradford City	Greenhous Meadow
15:00	Grandison 16'			Attendance: 6,272

14 April 2012 42	Shrewsbury Town	3–1	Rotherham United	Greenhous Meadow
15:00	Gornell 45+2' 67'; Wildig 48'		Cresswell 2'	Attendance: 5,873

17 April 2012 43	Shrewsbury Town	1–0	Port Vale	Greenhous Meadow
19:45	Richards 55'			Attendance: 7,678

21 April 2012 44	Accrington Stanley	1–1	Shrewsbury Town	Crown Ground
15:00	Hughes 78'		Gornell 31'	Attendance: 3,275

28 April 2012 45	Shrewsbury Town	1–0	Dagenham & Redbridge	Greenhous Meadow
15:00	Collins 38'			Attendance: 9,441

5 May 2012 46	AFC Wimbledon	3–1	Shrewsbury Town	Kingsmeadow
15:00	Harrison 47'; Moore 55' 61'		Cansdell-Sherriff 58'	Attendance: 3,678

=== FA Cup ===
12 November 2011 Round 1	Newport County	0–1	Shrewsbury Town	Newport Stadium
12:30 BST		Summary	Gornell 41'	Attendance: 2,362; Referee: Darren Drysdale

3 December 2011 Round 2	Shrewsbury Town	2–1	Rotherham United	Greenhous Meadow
15:00 BST	Sharps 48'; Wroe 83' (pen.)	Summary	Grabban 42'	Attendance: 4,048; Referee: Lee Collins

7 January 2012 Round 3	Middlesbrough	1–0	Shrewsbury Town	Riverside Stadium
15:00 BST	Emnes 40'	Summary		Attendance: 12,631; Referee: Tony Bates

=== League Cup ===
9 August 2011 Round 1	Derby County	2–3	Shrewsbury Town	Pride Park Stadium
19:45	Maguire 46'; Robinson 78'		Morgan 16', 37'; Collins 34'	Attendance: 7,073

23 August 2011 Round 2	Shrewsbury Town	3–1	Swansea City	Greenhous Meadow
19:45	Morgan 19'; Wright 67'; Wroe 90+1'		Cansdell-Sherriff 10' (o.g.)	Attendance: 4,063

20 September 2011 Round 3	Arsenal	3–1	Shrewsbury Town	Emirates Stadium
19:45	Kieran Gibbs; Alex Oxlade Chamberlain; Youssi Benayoun		James Collins

=== Football League Trophy ===
30 August 2011 Round 1	Walsall	2–1	Shrewsbury Town	Bank's Stadium
19:45	Jarvis 17'; Taundry 35'		Butler 48' (o.g.)	Attendance: 2,605

== Transfers ==
Players transferred in
Date	Pos.	Name	Previous club	Fee	Ref.
23 June 2011	FW	(England) Marvin Morgan	(England) Aldershot Town	Free	
28 June 2011	DF	(Wales) Joe Jacobson	(England) Accrington Stanley	Free (Bosman)	
30 June 2011	DF	(England) Reuben Hazell	(England) Oldham Athletic	Free (Bosman)	
28 July 2011	MF	(England) Matt Richards	(England) Walsall	Free (Bosman)	
29 July 2011	DF	(England) Carl Regan	(England) Bristol Rovers	Free	
4 August 2011	FW	(England) Terry Gornell	(England) Accrington Stanley	Undisclosed	
Players loaned in
Date from	Pos.	Name	From	Date to	Ref.
3 November 2011	MF	(England) James Wallace	(England) Everton	5 January 2012	
8 November 2011	MF	(Wales) Aaron Wildig	(Wales) Cardiff City	End of season	
18 November 2011	DF	(England) James Hurst	(England) West Bromwich Albion	4 January 2012	
12 January 2012	MF	(Republic of Ireland) David McAllister	(England) Sheffield United	14 April 2012	
27 January 2012	FW	(Saint Kitts and Nevis) Romaine Sawyers	(England) West Bromwich Albion	End of season	
2 March 2012	DF	(Northern Ireland) Conor McLaughlin	(England) Preston North End	End of season	
Players loaned out
Date from	Pos.	Name	To	Date to	Ref.
6 October 2011	MF	(Scotland) Steven Leslie	(England) Hereford United	8 January 2012	
6 March 2012	MF	(England) Lionel Ainsworth	(England) Burton Albion	6 April 2012	
Players transferred out
Date	Pos.	Name	To	Fee	Ref.
16 June 2011	FW	(England) Matt Harrold	(England) Bristol Rovers	Undisclosed Fee	
Players released
Date	Pos.	Name	Subsequent club	Join date	Ref.
8 June 2011	FW	(England) Jake Robinson	(England) Northampton Town	8 June 2011	
23 June 2011	FW	(England) Nathan Elder	(England) Hayes & Yeading	12 August 2011	
25 June 2011	MF	(England) Craig Disley	(England) Grimsby Town	26 June 2011	
1 July 2011	MF	(Netherlands) Benjamin van den Broek	(Netherlands) Den Bosch	1 July 2011 (Bosman)	
1 July 2011	DF	(England) Danny Taylor	(Wales) Airbus UK	8 July 2011	
1 July 2011	MF	(England) Kevin McIntyre	(England) Accrington Stanley	16 July 2011	
1 July 2011	DF	(England) Harry Hooman	(England) Cheltenham Town	26 July 2011	
1 July 2011	DF	(England) David Raven	(England) Tranmere Rovers	5 August 2011	
1 July 2011	DF	(England) Kelvin Lomax	(England) Barrow	15 August 2011	
27 January 2012	MF	(Scotland) Steven Leslie	(Wales) Wrexham	27 January 2012	

== Awards ==
End of Season Awards	Winner
Telegraph & Argus Bradford City Player of the Year	Matt Richards
Players' Player of the Year	Matt Richards
Player in the Community	Ian Sharps
Young Player of the Year	James Collins
Goal of the Season	Matt Richards vs Oxford United
