= Jon Taylor =

English footballer (born 1992)

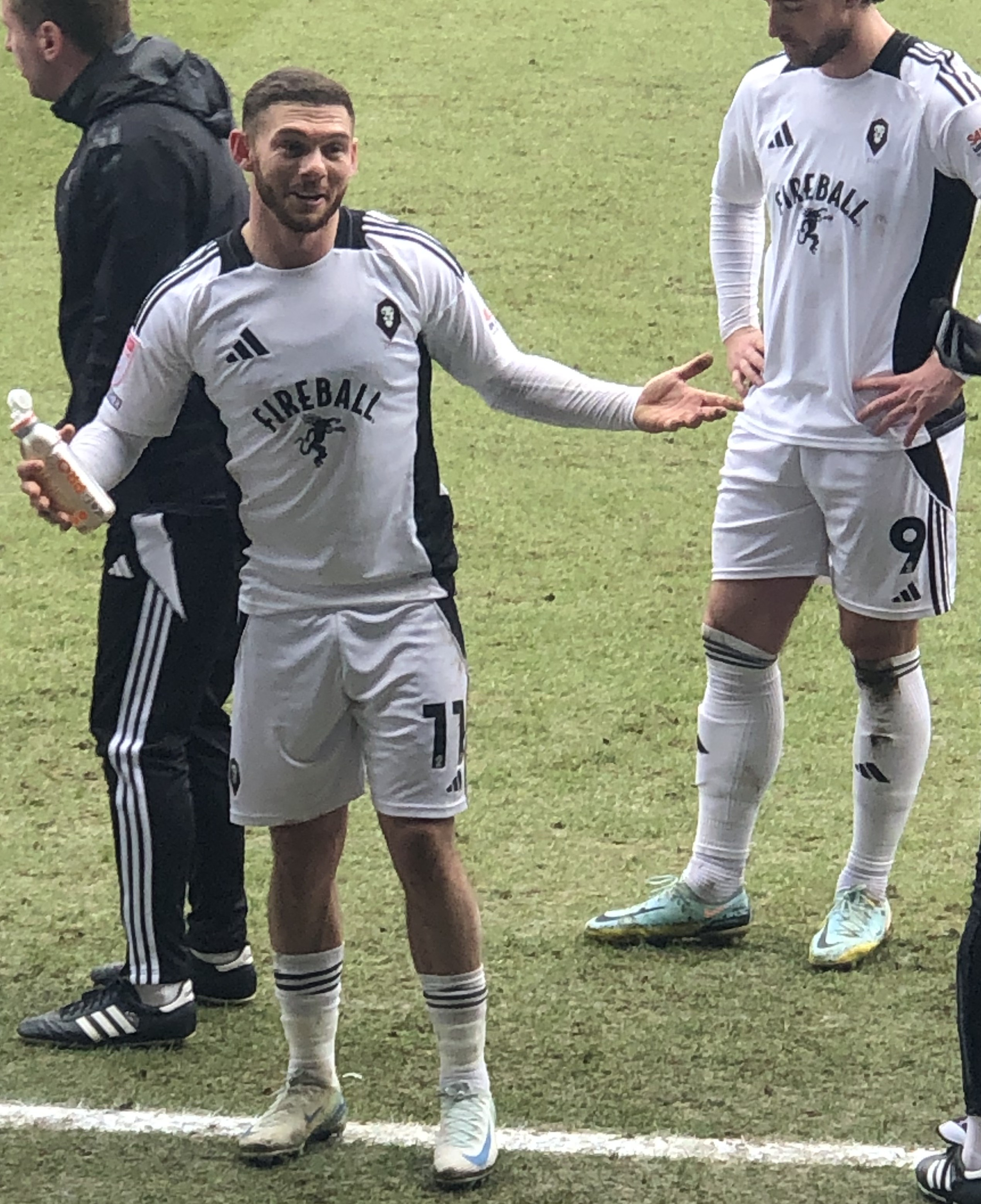
- Jon Taylor in 2025.

Personal information
- Full name: Jon Peter Taylor
- Date of birth: 20 July 1992 (age 34)
- Place of birth: Liverpool, England
- Height: 5 ft 8 in (1.72 m)
- Position: Winger

Team information
- Current team: Radcliffe

Youth career
- −2008: Wigan Athletic
- 2008–2010: Shrewsbury Town

Senior career*
Years	Team	Apps	(Gls)
2010–2014	Shrewsbury Town	133^{[A]}	(21)
2014–2016	Peterborough United	68	(14)
2016–2019	Rotherham United	108	(12)
2019–2024	Doncaster Rovers	70	(10)
2024–2025	Salford City	28	(1)
2025–	Radcliffe	21	(1)
- * Club domestic league appearances and goals as of 13:36, 22 February 2026 (UTC)

Jon Peter Taylor (born 20 July 1992) is an English professional footballer who plays as a winger for National League North club Radcliffe.

== Career ==
=== Shrewsbury Town ===
After being released as a youth trainee by Wigan Athletic, Taylor moved to Shrewsbury Town in 2008, having been recommended to the club by former Shrewsbury midfielder, Tony Kelly. Whilst still a youth player, he featured for Shrewsbury's first team sporadically in the 2009–10 season under manager Paul Simpson, making his début as a substitute in a League Two 1–0 away win against Chesterfield on 2 January 2010.

Taylor signed his first professional contract at Shrewsbury prior to the 2010–11 season, and made his first home start against Burton Albion on 1 February 2011, scoring twice in a 3–0 home win under new manager Graham Turner. He went on to make 22 appearances that season, scoring six goals, and earning the plaudits of his manager and then Shrewsbury captain Ian Sharps, as well as winning the Football League Young Player of the Month award for February 2011.

Having been linked with a move to Scottish clubs Motherwell or Aberdeen, Taylor signed a new two-year deal at Shrewsbury Town on 23 June 2011, following emergency talks with Graham Turner, and made 36 appearances in all competitions in the 2011–12 season where they secured promotion up to League One.

Not having scored a first team goal since March 2011, Taylor rediscovered his goal scoring touch in a 2–1 away defeat at Leyton Orient on 10 November 2012, and scored five more times in the 2012–13 season to help steer Shrewsbury clear of relegation during their first season in League One.

Taylor signed another two-year contract extension at Shrewsbury Town on 21 June 2013, making his 100th appearance in all competitions against MK Dons on 3 August 2013. He ended the 2013–14 season as Shrewsbury's top scorer, with nine goals in League One, although this was ultimately not enough to prevent the club's relegation.

=== Peterborough United ===
Following Shrewsbury Town's relegation to League Two, Taylor signed for Peterborough United for an undisclosed fee on 4 June 2014.

=== Rotherham United ===
On 3 August 2016, Taylor signed for Rotherham United for an undisclosed fee, understood to be a "club record deal". He agreed a three-year contract. On 30 May 2019 the club announced that Taylor would be leaving at the end of the season, as his contract expired.

=== Doncaster Rovers ===
Doncaster Rovers signed Taylor on 9 August 2019 on a two-year deal with an option on a third. On 15 May 2024, the club announced he would be released in the summer when his contract expired.

=== Salford City ===
On 20 July 2024, following a successful trial period, Taylor joined League Two side Salford City on a one-year deal.

=== Radcliffe ===
On 8 May 2025, Taylor agreed to join National League North side Radcliffe on a two-year deal.

== Career statistics ==
As of end of 2024–25 season

Appearances and goals by club, season and competition
Club	Season	League			FA Cup		League Cup		Other		Total	
Club	Season	Division	Apps	Goals	Apps	Goals	Apps	Goals	Apps	Goals	Apps	Goals
Shrewsbury Town	2009–10	League Two	2	0	0	0	0	0	0	0	2	0
Shrewsbury Town	2010–11	League Two	20	6	0	0	0	0	2 (Note: Appearances in League Two play-offs)	0	22	6
Shrewsbury Town	2011–12	League Two	33	0	2	0	1	0	0	0	36	0
Shrewsbury Town	2012–13	League One	37	6	1	0	0	0	1 (Note: Appearance in Football League Trophy)	0	39	6
Shrewsbury Town	2013–14	League One	41	9	1	0	1	0	1	0	44	9
Shrewsbury Town	Total		133	21	4	0	2	0	4	0	143	21
Peterborough United	2014–15	League One	24	3	1	0	0	0	0	0	25	3
Peterborough United	2015–16	League One	44	11	4	2	2	0	1	0	51	13
Peterborough United	Total		68	14	5	2	2	0	1	0	76	16
Rotherham United	2016–17	Championship	42	4	0	0	1	0	0	0	43	4
Rotherham United	2017–18	League One	25	4	1	0	1	0	5 (Note: 2 appearances in 2017–18 EFL Trophy. 3 appearances in 2017–18 EFL League One play-offs)	1	32	5
Rotherham United	2018–19	Championship	41	4	1	0	2	0	0	0	44	4
Rotherham United	Total		108	12	2	0	4	0	5	1	119	13
Doncaster Rovers	2019–20	League One	28	6	3	0	1	0	3	0	35	6
Doncaster Rovers	2020–21	League One	25	4	1	0	1	0	2	0	29	4
Doncaster Rovers	2021–22	League One	3	0	0	0	0	0	0	0	3	0
Doncaster Rovers	2022–23	League Two	11	0	1	0	0	0	2	0	14	0
Doncaster Rovers	2023–24	League Two	3	0	0	0	0	0	2	0	5	0
Doncaster Rovers	Total		70	10	5	0	2	0	9	0	86	10
Salford City	2024–25	League Two	28	1	2	0	0	0	2	0	32	1
Career total			407	58	18	2	10	0	21	1	456	61

=== Footnotes ===
A. Soccerbase incorrectly states that Jon Taylor played for Shrewsbury Town in a match against Burton Albion on 16 January 2010. It was actually Danny Taylor who played in this match, whilst Jon Taylor was an unused substitute. Therefore, unless corrected, Jon Taylor always has one less football league appearance than what is stated on Soccerbase.

== Honours ==
Rotherham United

- EFL League One play-offs: 2018
