= Ryan Woods (footballer, born 1993) =

English footballer

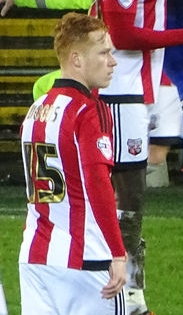
- Woods playing for Brentford in 2015

Personal information
- Full name: Ryan Michael Woods
- Date of birth: 13 December 1993 (age 32)
- Place of birth: Norton Canes, England
- Height: 5 ft 8 in (1.73 m)
- Position: Defensive midfielder

Team information
- Current team: Solihull Moors (on loan from Oldham Athletic)
- Number: 18

Youth career
- –2009: Walsall
- 2009–2012: Shrewsbury Town

Senior career*
Years	Team	Apps	(Gls)
2012–2015	Shrewsbury Town	91	(1)
2015–2019	Brentford	122	(3)
2018–2019	→ Stoke City (loan)	21	(0)
2019–2021	Stoke City	14	(0)
2020	→ Millwall (loan)	18	(0)
2020–2021	→ Millwall (loan)	41	(0)
2021–2022	Birmingham City	32	(0)
2022–2024	Hull City	26	(0)
2023–2024	→ Bristol Rovers (loan)	12	(0)
2024	→ Exeter City (loan)	14	(0)
2024–2025	Exeter City	37	(2)
2025–	Oldham Athletic	43	(0)
2026–	→ Solihull Moors (loan)	0	(0)
- * Club domestic league appearances and goals as of 13:30, 5 September 2026 (UTC)

Ryan Michael Woods (born 13 December 1993) is an English professional footballer who plays as a defensive midfielder for Solihull Moors on loan from EFL League Two club Oldham Athletic.

Woods began his senior career with Shrewsbury Town and is a product of the Shrewsbury Town and Walsall youth systems. In 2015, after helping Shrewsbury to promotion back to League One, he transferred to Brentford for a fee of £1 million. He became a key member of the Brentford squad helping the team to establish themselves in the Championship. Woods spent four seasons at Griffin Park before joining Stoke City in August 2018. Woods struggled for game time at Stoke following a change of managers and he spent one-and-a-half seasons on loan at Millwall. He joined Birmingham City in June 2021, and left for Hull City just over a year later, from where he had loan spells at Bristol Rovers and, more successfully at Exeter City. Woods left Hull City by mutual consent in July 2024 before it was confirmed he had joined Exeter City on a permanent transfer.

== Career ==
=== Shrewsbury Town ===
Woods began his youth career with local club Walsall, but was released at age 15 and moved to Shrewsbury Town in 2009. He completed a scholarship and signed his first professional contract in May 2012. Woods received his maiden call into the first team squad for a League One match at home to Carlisle United on 15 December 2012, but remained an unused substitute during the 2–1 win. After six further calls into the squad, Woods made his debut as an 89th-minute substitute for Aaron Wildig in a 1–0 home win over Oldham Athletic on 23 April 2013. Four days later he played his only other game of the season, again replacing Wildig for the last six minutes of a 3–2 win against Portsmouth at the New Meadow. He signed a contract extension on 10 June 2013.

Woods made his first senior start for Shrewsbury Town in a 2–2 draw away at Rotherham United on 24 August 2013, playing at right back owing to a shortage of defenders. He scored his first senior goal – and only Shrewsbury goal – on 11 January 2014, in the seventh minute of a 3–2 defeat to Milton Keynes Dons at the Stadium mk. Having established himself in the first team, with 43 appearances in all competitions in 2013–14, he triggered a clause in his contract to extend his stay at the club for at least another season, despite the Shrews' relegation to League Two. His performances during the campaign earned him the Shrewsbury Town Away Travel Club Young Player of the Year and the Family Stand Player of the Season awards.

Woods had an excellent 2014–15 season, making 51 appearances and helping Shrewsbury secure automatic promotion back to League One with a second-place finish. Woods and teammate Connor Goldson were named in the League Two PFA Team of the Year. Woods was nominated for the League Two Player of the Year at the Football League Awards, but lost out to Danny Mayor of Bury. Woods began the 2015–16 season as an ever-present and following vice-captain Connor Goldson's departure, he captained Shrewsbury for the first time on 22 August 2015. Woods' final Shrewsbury appearance came on 29 August in a 1–0 defeat to Burton Albion and he departed the New Meadow three days later on transfer deadline day. He made 103 appearances and scored once during his three years as a professional with Shrewsbury Town.

=== Brentford ===
Woods signed a three-year contract with Championship club Brentford on 1 September 2015. The fee, officially undisclosed, was reported locally as £1 million. He made his debut 11 days later, away to Leeds United, as a 74th-minute substitute for Maxime Colin. Two minutes after coming on, he turned over possession to Mirko Antenucci, who then scored the equaliser in a 1–1 draw. After the appointment of interim manager Lee Carsley later that month, Woods became a regular starter. He scored his first Brentford goal with a long-range strike to open a 2–1 win over Reading at the Madejski Stadium on 28 December, assisting Sergi Canós for the winning goal in the second half. On 23 April 2016, he scored from a similar distance in a 4–1 win at Milton Keynes Dons, a result which confirmed the opponents' relegation. He finished the 2015–16 season with 42 appearances and two goals.

After beginning the 2016–17 season as an ever-present in central midfield, Woods signed a new four-year contract on 31 August 2016. He made 45 appearances during the season and won the club's Players' Player of the Year award. Aside from a short period out of the team for personal reasons, Woods continued as an ever-present during the early months of the 2017–18 season and scored his first goal of the campaign in a 3–1 victory over Leeds United on 4 November 2017. He received the first red card of his career as a result of "scuffling over the ball" with Sheffield United goalkeeper Jamal Blackman during a 1–1 draw on 30 March 2018. Woods finished the 2017–18 season with 40 appearances and one goal and was voted the club's Supporters' Player of the Year.

=== Stoke City ===
On 25 August 2018, Woods joined Championship club Stoke City from Brentford on 25 August 2018 on loan, with the intention of making the move permanent the following January. He made his debut on 1 September against West Bromwich Albion. Woods began his Stoke career well under Gary Rowett and was made stand-in captain in the absence of Ryan Shawcross. However his form dropped off by December as Stoke were struggling to put a run of wins together. Woods rarely featured in the second half of the campaign under the management of Nathan Jones as Stoke finished in 16th position.

Woods started three matches under Jones at the start of the 2019–20 season before losing his place in the side. Woods returned to the side under new manager Michael O'Neill in November 2019 starting in five consecutive games. However he lost his place in the team again and was linked with a move away from the club in the January transfer window.

=== Millwall (loan) ===
On 17 January 2020 Woods signed on loan with Championship rivals Millwall managed by Gary Rowett, for the remainder of the 2019–20 season. Woods played 18 times for the Lions as they finished in eighth position, narrowly missing out on a play-off place. He re-signed with Millwall, again on loan, for the 2020–21 season. Woods was a regular in the side under Rowett, making 46 appearances as Millwall finished in 11th position.

=== Birmingham City ===
Woods joined another Championship club, Birmingham City, on 23 June 2021 on a three-year contract. He made his debut in the starting eleven for the opening fixture, away to Sheffield United, made the pass from which Jérémie Bela crossed for Maxime Colin to head the only goal of the game, and was booked for what the Birmingham Mail described as a rugby tackle. A few weeks into the season, he said that an improved diet and extra training had improved his fitness, which in turn improved his morale and his potential impact: "I feel like my old self again. I can get around the pitch and feel like I can really affect games off the ball as well as on it now". However, the team's lack of goals and defensive frailty meant Woods lost his starting place in favour of the more defensively solid Gary Gardner: according to head coach Lee Bowyer, "The stability comes at the cost of the attacking fluency because you are taking Ryan Woods out of the team and, whether you like it or not, we give the ball away too much. When Ryan was in the team we were having a lot of chances in games but we were vulnerable defensively so you have got to have that balance." He returned only after Gardner was sent off, but was himself sent off against Coventry City for bringing down Ian Maatsen with what his manager saw as a professional foul worthy of a yellow card but was viewed by the referee and the Football Association's appeals panel as serious foul play.

After serving his suspension, Woods returned to the starting eleven for the 6–2 defeat at Fulham in mid-January and remained a regular for the next six weeks, taking advantage of having "technically-assured team-mates to pass the ball to" in recent arrivals Onel Hernández and Juninho Bacuna. Despite the Mail's belief that his ball retention was important to the side, Bowyer changed formation to accommodate Tahith Chong's return from injury, Woods lost his place to the defensive midfielder Ivan Šunjić, and he made only four appearances in the last two months of the season. Under new head coach John Eustace, Woods started Birmingham's first two league matches of the 2022–23 season, but was a late withdrawal from the squad for the third amid rumours that he was about to join division rivals Hull City. Eustace said that "we don't want to lose players but we have to balance the books as well."

=== Hull City ===
Woods signed a three-year contract with Championship club Hull City on 18 August 2022; the fee was undisclosed.

In August 2023, manager Liam Rosenior announced that Woods would not be in his plans for the upcoming season and that he was free to depart the club.

On 25 August 2023, Woods joined League One club Bristol Rovers on a season-long loan. He returned to his parent club on 10 January 2024.

On 1 February 2024, Woods returned to League One, joining Exeter City on loan for the remainder of the season.

Woods left Hull City by mutual consent on 1 July 2024.

=== Exeter City ===
On 2 July 2024, Woods signed for Exeter City on a permanent two-year contract after the successful loan spell with the Grecians during the second half of the 2023-24 season. On 5 October 2024, Woods scored his first goal since 2017 in a 1–0 win verses Cambridge United.

=== Oldham Athletic ===
On 7 July 2025, Woods joined newly promoted League Two side Oldham Athletic on a two-year deal.

He was made available for transfer following the conclusion of the 2025–26 season.

On 5 September 2026, Woods joined National League club Solihull Moors on a three-month loan deal.

== Style of play ==
Although Woods' favoured position is as a central midfielder (being dubbed "the ginger Pirlo" by the Shrewsbury Town supporters), he can also play in a variety of positions in defence and midfield. During the 2013–14 season he demonstrated his versatility by also playing right back, on the right side of midfield and at left back. In January 2015, FourFourTwo named Woods as one of the 10 best young players in the Football League. The magazine reported that he demonstrates "an ability to play a range [of] passes, as well as easily creating space for himself" and quoted Shrewsbury Town manager Micky Mellon as saying "he's the first player on the training pitch and the last off. He's a terrific kid and has some unbelievable ability".

== Personal life ==
Woods was born in Norton Canes, Staffordshire, and raised in Pelsall. He supported Walsall as a youngster.

== Career statistics ==
As of end of 2025–26 season

Appearances and goals by club, season and competition
Club	Season	League			FA Cup		League Cup		Other		Total	
Club	Season	Division	Apps	Goals	Apps	Goals	Apps	Goals	Apps	Goals	Apps	Goals
Shrewsbury Town	2012–13	League One	2	0	0	0	0	0	0	0	2	0
Shrewsbury Town	2013–14	League One	41	1	1	0	0	0	1 (Note: Appearance(s) in Football League Trophy)	0	43	1
Shrewsbury Town	2014–15	League Two	43	0	3	0	4	0	1	0	51	0
Shrewsbury Town	2015–16	League One	5	0	0	0	2	0	—		7	0
Shrewsbury Town	Total		91	1	4	0	6	0	2	0	103	1
Brentford	2015–16	Championship	41	2	1	0	0	0	—		42	2
Brentford	2016–17	Championship	42	0	2	0	1	0	—		45	0
Brentford	2017–18	Championship	39	1	0	0	1	0	—		40	1
Brentford	2018–19	Championship	0	0	0	0	1	0	—		1	0
Brentford	Total		122	3	3	0	3	0	—		128	3
Stoke City	2018–19	Championship	27	0	0	0	0	0	—		27	0
Stoke City	2019–20	Championship	8	0	1	0	3	0	—		12	0
Stoke City	2020–21	Championship	0	0	0	0	0	0	—		0	0
Stoke City	Total		35	0	1	0	3	0	—		39	0
Millwall (loan)	2019–20	Championship	18	0	0	0	0	0	—		18	0
Millwall (loan)	2020–21	Championship	41	0	2	0	3	0	—		46	0
Millwall (loan)	Total		59	0	2	0	3	0	—		64	0
Birmingham City	2021–22	Championship	30	0	1	0	0	0	—		31	0
Birmingham City	2022–23	Championship	2	0	—		0	0	—		2	0
Birmingham City	Total		32	0	1	0	0	0	—		33	0
Hull City	2022–23	Championship	26	0	1	0	—		—		27	0
Hull City	2023–24	Championship	0	0	0	0	0	0	—		0	0
Hull City	Total		26	0	1	0	0	0	—		27	0
Bristol Rovers (loan)	2023–24	League One	12	0	1	0	—		3	0	16	0
Exeter City (loan)	2023–24	League One	14	0	—		—		—		14	0
Exeter City	2024–25	League One	37	2	4	0	0	0	0	0	41	2
Oldham Athletic	2025–26	League Two	43	0	2	0	1	0	2	0	48	0
Career total			471	6	19	0	16	0	7	0	513	6

== Honours ==
Shrewsbury Town

- Football League Two runner-up: 2014–15

Individual

- PFA League Two Team of the Year: 2014–15
- Brentford Supporters' Player of the Year: 2017–18
- Brentford Players' Player of the Year: 2016–17
