= 2012–13 Shrewsbury Town F.C. season =

Shrewsbury Town F.C.
2012–13 season
- Chairman: Roland Wycherley
- Manager: Graham Turner
- League One: 16th
- FA Cup: First round (eliminated by Hereford United)
- League Cup: First round (eliminated by Leeds United)
- Football League Trophy: Second round (eliminated by Crewe Alexandra)
- Top goalscorer: League: Marvin Morgan (7); All: Marvin Morgan (7)
- Highest home attendance: 8,021 vs Portsmouth; 27 April 2013
- Lowest home attendance: 2,063 vs Crewe Alexandra (All) 9 October 2012; 4,711 vs Yeovil (League) 23 October 2012
- Average home league attendance: 5,734 (11th in the league)
Home colours	Away colours

The 2012–13 season was Shrewsbury's first season back in League One following promotion from League Two the previous season. They also participated in the FA Cup, the Football League Trophy and the League Cup.

== Season review ==
Shrewsbury entered the League Cup at the first round stage, but were knocked out by Leeds United after losing 4–0. They entered the Football League Trophy at the second round stage on 9 October 2012, and where beaten at home by Crewe Alexandra 1–2. They entered the FA Cup at the second round stage on 3 November away to Hereford United.

== Transfers ==
=== In ===
Date	Position	Nationality	Name	From	Fee
		(England)	Elliott Turner	Trainee	Free
15 May 2012	MF	(England)	Asa Hall	(England) Oxford United	Free
29 May 2012	MF	(Wales)	Aaron Wildig	(Wales) Cardiff City	Free
20 June 2012	FW	(Wales)	Ryan Doble	(England) Southampton	Free
3 July 2012	MF	(England)	Luke Summerfield	(England) Cheltenham Town	Free
6 July 2012	GK	(England)	Chris Weale	(England) Leicester City	Free
6 July 2012	GK	(England)	Joe Anyon	(England) Lincoln City	Free
9 July 2012	MF	(Wales)	Paul Parry	(England) Preston North End	Free

=== Loans in ===
Date from	Date to	Position	Nationality	Name	From
24 July 2012	2 January 2013	DF	(England)	Michael Hector	Reading
28 September 2012	28 November 2012	DF	(England)	Lee Collins	Barnsley
28 September 2012	28 October 2012	FW	(England)	Sam Winnall	Wolverhampton Wanderers
25 October 2012	25 November 2012	DF	(France)	Jeremy Helan	Manchester City
26 October 2012	26 November 2012	FW	(England)	Jamie Proctor	Swansea City

=== Out ===
Date	Position	Nationality	Name	To	Fee
16 May 2012	DF	(Australia)	Shane Cansdell-Sherriff	Preston North End	Free
16 May 2012	MF	(England)	Nicky Wroe	Preston North End	Free
22 May 2012	DF	(England)	Ian Sharps	Rotherham United	Free
18 June 2012	MF	(England)	Lionel Ainsworth	Rotherham United	Free
July 2012	GK	(England)	Chris Neal	Port Vale	Free
2012	FW	(Republic of Ireland)	James Collins	Swindon Town	£125,000
10 August 2012	GK	(England)	Ben Smith	Rochdale	Free

=== Released ===
Date	Position	Nationality	Name	Joined
June 2012	MF	(England)	Sean McAllister	Port Vale
June 2012	DF	(England)	Carl Regan	Notts County
15 October 2012	DF	(England)	Reuben Hazell	

== Squad ==
As of 31 October 2012

Note: Flags indicate national team as defined under FIFA eligibility rules; some limited exceptions apply. Players may hold more than one non-FIFA nationality.

No.	Pos.	Nation	Player
1	GK	ENG	Chris Weale
2	DF	ENG	Jermaine Grandison
3	DF	WAL	Joe Jacobson
4	MF	ENG	Luke Summerfield
5	DF	WAL	Darren Jones
6	MF	ENG	Rob Purdie
7	MF	ENG	Mark Wright
8	MF	ENG	Matt Richards (captain)
9	FW	WAL	Tom Bradshaw
10	FW	ENG	Marvin Morgan
11	MF	ENG	Jon Taylor
14	MF	ENG	Asa Hall

No.	Pos.	Nation	Player
15	DF	ENG	Lee Collins (on loan from Barnsley)
16	FW	WAL	Ryan Doble
17	MF	WAL	Paul Parry
18	DF	ENG	Connor Goldson
20	MF	ENG	Aaron Wildig
21	MF	ENG	Elliott Turner
22	MF	ENG	Ryan Woods
23	DF	ENG	Michael Hector (on loan from Reading)
24	FW	ENG	Terry Gornell
25	GK	ENG	Joe Anyon
26	DF	FRA	Jeremy Helan (on loan from Manchester City)
27	FW	ENG	Jamie Proctor (on loan from Swansea City)

=== Friendly matches ===
19 July 2012 1	Evesham United	0–0	Shrewsbury Town	Spiers and Hartwell Jubilee Stadium
19:45 BST (UTC+1)				Attendance: 265; Referee: Derek Eaton

24 July 2012 2	Shrewsbury Town	1–2	Birmingham City	New Meadow
19:45 BST (UTC+1)	Morgan 17'		Hancox 39' Žigić 72'	Attendance: 3,202; Referee: Bobby Madley

28 July 2012 3	Shrewsbury Town	2–0	Leicester City	New Meadow
15:00 BST (UTC+1)	Gornell 22' Morgan 58'			Attendance: 1,800; Referee: Chris Sarginson

31 July 2012 4	Shrewsbury Town	2–2	Wolverhampton Wanderers	New Meadow
19:00 BST (UTC+1)	Gornell 19' Berra o.g. 41'		Ebanks-Blake 51' Doumbia 75'	Attendance: 4,105; Referee: Rob Lewis

3 August 2012 5	Worcester City	2–3	Shrewsbury Town	St George's Lane
19.45 BST (UTC+1)	Glover 7' (pen.) Thorley 20' (pen.)		Gornell 5', 72' Wright 21'	Attendance: 528; Referee: C Husband

== Competitions ==
=== League One ===
==== League table ====
Pos	Team	Pld	W	D	L	GF	GA	GD	Pts
14	Preston North End	46	14	17	15	54	49	+5	59
15	Coventry City	46	18	11	17	66	59	+7	55 (Note: On 28 March Coventry City were deducted ten points for entering administration.)
16	Shrewsbury Town	46	13	16	17	54	60	−6	55
17	Carlisle United	46	14	13	19	56	77	−21	55
18	Stevenage	46	15	9	22	47	64	−17	54

Updated to match(es) played on 27 April 2013. Source: BBC Sport
Rules for classification: 1) Points; 2) Goal difference; 3) Number of goals scored

==== Results ====
18 August 2012 1	Sheffield United	1–0	Shrewsbury Town	Bramall Lane
15:00 BST (UTC+1)	McAllister 4'	Report		Attendance: 18,286; Referee: David Coote

21 August 2012 2	Shrewsbury Town	1–0	Preston North End	New Meadow
19:45 BST (UTC+1)	Parry 4'	Report		Attendance: 6,444; Referee: Scott Mathieson

25 August 2012 3	Shrewsbury Town	1–1	Tranmere Rovers	New Meadow
15:00 BST (UTC+1)	Morgan 45+2'	Report	Akpa Akpro 88'	Attendance: 6,253; Referee: Steve Rushton

1 September 2012 4	Stevenage	1–1	Shrewsbury Town	Lamex Stadium
15:00 BST (UTC+1)	Charles 24'	Report	Parry 5'	Attendance: 2,374; Referee: Dean Whitestone

8 September 2012 5	Notts County	3–2	Shrewsbury Town	Meadow Lane
15.00 BST (UTC+1)	Zoko 57'; J. Hughes 64'; L. Hughes 87'	Report	Richards 61' (pen.) Grandison 62'	Attendance: 6,774; Referee: Andrew Madley

15 September 2012 6	Shrewsbury Town	0–1	Scunthorpe United	New Meadow
15.00 BST (UTC+1)		Report	Clarke 5'	Attendance: 5,623; Referee: Graham Salisbury

18 September 2012 7	Shrewsbury Town	4–1	Coventry City	New Meadow
19.45 BST (UTC+1)	Jones 3'; Parry 21'; Richards 62' (pen.); Morgan 64'	Report	Fleck 75' (pen.)	Attendance: 5,960; Referee: Dean Mohareb

22 September 2012 8	Hartlepool United	2–2	Shrewsbury Town	Victoria Park
15.00 BST (UTC+1)	Franks 15'; Monkhouse 90'	Report	Morgan 27', 82'	Attendance: 3,909; Referee: Michael Naylor

29 September 2012 9	Shrewsbury Town	0–1	Swindon Town	New Meadow
15.00 BST (UTC+1)		Report	Ferry 79'	Attendance: 6,303; Referee: David Webb

2 October 2012 10	Brentford	0–0	Shrewsbury Town	Griffin Park
19.45 BST (UTC+1)		Report		Attendance: 4,384; Referee: Tim Robinson

6 October 2012 11	Doncaster Rovers	1–0	Shrewsbury Town	Keepmoat Stadium
15.00 BST (UTC+1)	Paynter 4' (pen.)	https://www.bbc.co.uk/sport/football/19768885 Report]		Attendance: 6,437; Referee: Richard Clark

14 October 2012 12	Shrewsbury Town	1–0	Walsall	New Meadow
15.30 BST (UTC+1)	Parry 25'	Report		Attendance: 6,495; Referee: Bobby Madley

20 October 2012 13	Portsmouth	3–1	Shrewsbury Town	Fratton Park
15.00 BST (UTC+1)	Thomas 55'; McLeod 58', 90+4'	Report	Morgan 61'; Morgan (yellow card) 61' (yellow-red card) 61'	Attendance: 13,051; Referee: Fred Graham

23 October 2012 14	Shrewsbury Town	1–3	Yeovil Town	New Meadow
19.45 BST (UTC+1)	Richards 81' (pen.)	Report	Madden 9', 70'; Hayter 60'	Attendance: 4,711; Referee: David Coote

27 October 2012 15	Shrewsbury Town	2–2	Colchester United	New Meadow
15:00 BST (UTC+1)	Hall 79', 82'	Report	Eastmond 3'; Watt 62'	Attendance: 5,066; Referee: Jeremy Simpson

6 November 2012 16	Bournemouth	2–1	Shrewsbury Town	Dean Court
19:45 GMT (UTC+0)	Daniels 3'; McQuoid 6'	Report	Richards 14' (pen.)	Attendance: 5,022; Referee: Trevor Kettle

10 November 2012 17	Leyton Orient	2–1	Shrewsbury Town	Matchroom Stadium
15:00 GMT (UTC+0)	Lisbie 33' (pen.); 88'	Report	Taylor 70'	Attendance: 3,822; Referee: Carl Berry

17 November 2012 18	Shrewsbury Town	1–0	Crewe Alexandra	New Meadow
15:00 GMT (UTC+0)	Summerfield 43'	Report		Attendance: 6,169; Referee: C. Sarginson

20 November 2012 19	Shrewsbury Town	2–2	MK Dons	New Meadow
19:15GMT (UTC+0)	Rodgers 65'; Wright 72'	Report	Balanta 45'; Bowditch 90'	Attendance: 4,747; Referee: D. Drysdale

24 November 2012 20	Oldham Athletic	1–0	Shrewsbury Town	Boundary Park
15:00 GMT (UTC+0)	Grounds 13'	Report		Attendance: 3,886; Referee: S. Attwell

8 December 2012 21	Crawley Town	2–2	Shrewsbury Town	Broadfield Stadium
15:00 GMT (UTC+0)	Simpson 1', 81'	Report	Richards 14'; Taylor 34'	Attendance: 2,770; Referee: Andy Woolmer

15 December 2012 22	Shrewsbury Town	2–1	Carlisle United	New Meadow
15:00 GMT (UTC+0)	Taylor 22'; Parry 64'	Report	Noble 33'	Attendance: 5,260; Referee: K. Stroud

21 December 2012 23	Bury	2–2	Shrewsbury Town	Gigg Lane
19:45GMT (UTC+0)	Doherty 10'; Schumacher 90'	Report	Wildig 1'; Taylor 68'	Attendance: 3,536; Referee: Scott Duncan

26 December 2012 24	Shrewsbury Town	2–2	Notts County	New Meadow
15:00 GMT (UTC+0)	Rodgers 19'; Taylor 81'	Report	Hughes 24'; Campbell-Ryce 45'	Attendance: 6,474; Referee: S. Martin

29 December 2012 25	Shrewsbury Town	0–0	Brentford	New Meadow
15:00 GMT (UTC+0)		Report		Attendance: 5,715; Referee: D. Bond

1 January 2013 26	Coventry City	0–1	Shrewsbury Town	Ricoh Arena
15:00 GMT (UTC+0)		Report	Morgan 63'	Attendance: 15,185; Referee: D. Deadman

5 January 2012 27	Scunthorpe United	0–0	Shrewsbury Town	Glanford Park
15:00 GMT (UTC+0)		Report		Attendance: 3,044; Referee: A. Haines

12 January 2013 28	Shrewsbury Town	1–1	Hartlepool United	New Meadow
15:00 GMT (UTC+0)	Taylor 23'	Report	Wyke 55'	Attendance: 5,101; Referee: C. Berry

19 January 2012 29	Swindon Town	2–0	Shrewsbury Town	County Ground
15.00 GMT (UTC)	Martin 49'; Williams 53'	Report		Attendance: 7,754; Referee: R. Clark

26 January 2013 30	Shrewsbury Town	0–0	Bury	New Meadow
15.00 GMT (UTC)		Report		Attendance: 4,795; Referee: P. Gibbs

2 February 2013 31	Preston North End	1–2	Shrewsbury Town	Deepdale
15.00 GMT (UTC)	Beavon 43'	Report	Taylor 64'; Richards 90' (pen.)	Attendance: 8,331; Referee: S. Duncan

9 February 2013 32	Shrewsbury Town	1–2	Sheffield United	New Meadow
15.00 GMT (UTC)	McGinn 88'	Report	Duncan 63'; Kitson 72'	Attendance: 7,232; Referee: M. Heywood

15 February 2013 33	Tranmere Rovers	0–2	Shrewsbury Town	Prenton Park
		Report	Porter 10'; Gayle 67'	Attendance: 9,127; Referee: M. Brown

23 February 2013 34	Shrewsbury Town	2–1	Stevenage	New Meadow
	Parry 31'; Morgan 86'	Report	Dunne 20'	Attendance: 4,818; Referee: C. Boyenson

26 February 2013 35	Shrewsbury Town	1–2	Doncaster Rovers	New Meadow
	Eaves 90'	Report	Husband 73'; Bennett 90+3'	Attendance: 4,886; Referee: O. Langford

=== FA Cup ===
3 November 2012 First round	Hereford United	3–1	Shrewsbury Town	Edgar Street
13:00 GMT (UTC)	Evans 3'; Bowman 12', 73' (pen.)	Report	Summerfield 30'	Attendance: 3,251; Referee: Gary Sutton

=== Football League Cup ===
11 August 2012 First round	Leeds United	4–0	Shrewsbury Town	Elland Road
15:00 BST (UTC+1)	Becchio 20'; Varney 26'; Norris 66'; McCormack 70' (pen.)	Report		Attendance: 18,194; Referee: Mark Heywood

=== Football League Trophy ===
9 October 2012 Second round	Shrewsbury Town	1–2	Crewe Alexandra	New Meadow
19.15 BST (UTC+1)	Hall 61'	Report	Murphy 9' Clayton 57'	Attendance: 2,063; Referee: Paul Tierney
