= Connor Goldson =

English professional footballer (born 1992)

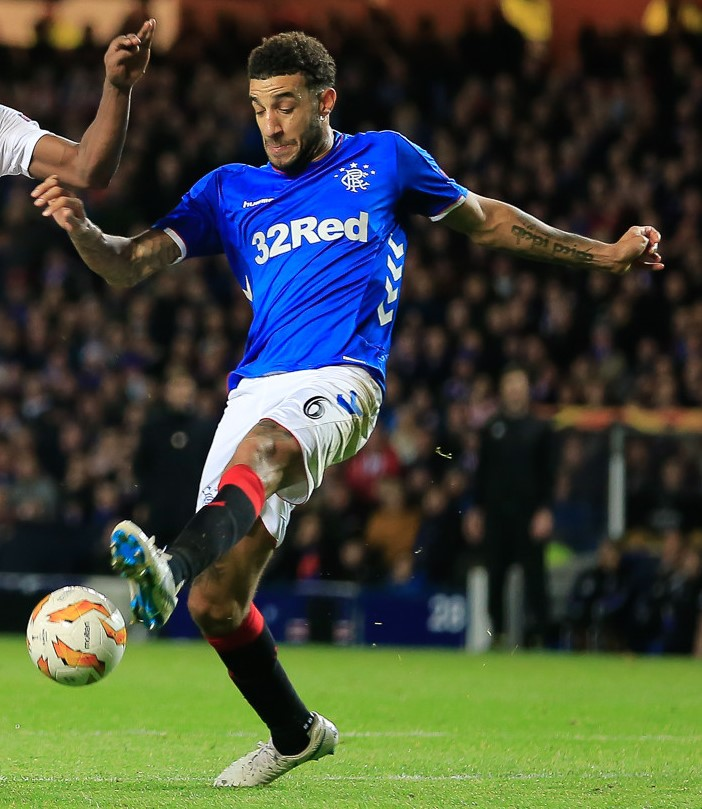
- Goldson playing for Rangers in 2018

Personal information
- Full name: Connor Lambert Goldson
- Date of birth: 18 December 1992 (age 33)
- Place of birth: Wolverhampton, England
- Height: 6 ft 3 in (1.91 m)
- Position: Centre-back

Team information
- Current team: Apollon Limassol
- Number: 6

Youth career
- Shrewsbury Town

Senior career*
Years	Team	Apps	(Gls)
2010–2015	Shrewsbury Town	106	(8)
2013–2014	→ Cheltenham Town (loan)	4	(0)
2015–2018	Brighton & Hove Albion	32	(2)
2018–2024	Rangers	192	(15)
2024–2026	Aris Limassol	55	(2)
2026–	Apollon Limassol	0	(0)
- * Club domestic league appearances and goals as of 26 June 2026

Connor Lambert Goldson (born 18 December 1992) is an English professional footballer who plays for Cypriot First Division club, Apollon Limassol. His preferred position is at centre-back, although he has also been utilised at right-back, and as a central midfielder.

He began his career at Shrewsbury Town, whom he represented in 120 competitive matches, scoring eight goals, seven coming in one season, and also spending time on loan at Cheltenham Town. In 2015, after a promotion-winning season for Shrewsbury, he signed for Brighton & Hove Albion. His career was interrupted in 2017, when a screening found that Goldson had a defect in his heart. He joined Rangers in 2018 under Steven Gerrard.

== Career ==
=== Shrewsbury Town ===
Born in Wolverhampton, West Midlands, Goldson attended Thomas Telford School and was awarded his first professional contract midway through his youth scholarship with Shrewsbury Town in May 2010. He made his debut during a 5–1 away win at Lincoln City on 8 February 2011, coming on as a 69th-minute substitute for Jermaine Grandison. With captain Ian Sharps suspended, he made his full debut on 1 March, in a 3–0 home defeat to Bury, and featured sporadically the following season as Shrewsbury won promotion to League One.

He enjoyed an extended run at the end of the 2012–13 season, featuring in nine consecutive matches and scoring his first senior goal on the last day of the season against Portsmouth for a 3–2 home win. Having helped Shrewsbury secure safety in their first season in League One, Goldson signed a contract extension on 21 June 2013.

On 28 November 2013, Goldson joined Cheltenham Town on loan initially until 4 January 2014. He made his Cheltenham debut as an added-time substitute for David Noble in a 1–0 away win against Morecambe on 7 December. Although his loan was later being extended by a further month, Goldson was recalled by his parent club on 9 January 2014 due to an injury to fellow defender Darren Jones. Following his recall, Goldson was ever-present under caretaker manager Michael Jackson, although he was unable to stop Shrewsbury suffering relegation back to League Two. Despite receiving offers from Premier League clubs, Goldson signed a new two-year contract extension on 4 July 2014, having been convinced to stay by new manager Micky Mellon.

He captained Shrewsbury Town for a whole match for the first time on 12 August 2014, in a League Cup first round victory over Championship club Blackpool, in the absence of regular skipper Liam Lawrence from the starting eleven. Goldson made his 100th Football League appearance for Shrewsbury in a home match against Dagenham & Redbridge on 3 April 2015, scoring both goals in a 2–0 win.

After securing promotion back to League One with a 1–0 victory over former loan club Cheltenham Town on 25 April, it was announced the following day that Goldson had been awarded a place on the PFA League Two Team of the Year for 2014–15, along with teammate Ryan Woods. At the conclusion of the season, he also won both the supporters' Player of the season and the Players' player of the season at the club's annual awards night for 2014–15.

Goldson made his last appearance for Shrewsbury in a 1–1 away match at Bradford City on 15 August 2015, before declaring himself unfit prior to the following home match against Chesterfield three days later.

=== Brighton & Hove Albion ===
Goldson joined Brighton & Hove Albion for an undisclosed fee, signing a four-year deal on 19 August 2015. He was first included in a Seagulls squad a month later, as an unused substitute in a goalless Championship draw at his hometown club Wolverhampton Wanderers, a result which kept his team at the top of the table.

After Brighton's 2–2 draw at Derby County on 12 December, Goldson alleged racial abuse by a home fan at Pride Park, which was investigated by the police. A week later, he made his Seagulls debut, replacing the injured Uwe Hünemeier for the final half-hour of a 3–0 home loss to Middlesbrough. His first start came on 29 December, in place of the injured Gordon Greer for a 1–0 loss to Ipswich Town at the Falmer Stadium. Three days later, when Brighton hosted Wolverhampton, Goldson scored an own goal from Jordan Graham's cross in the 32nd minute, the only goal of the game.

On 4 April 2016, Goldson scored his first goal for Brighton, equalising as they came from behind to win 2–1 at Birmingham City. The Seagulls came third and qualified for the play-offs; Goldson was one of four of their players who went off injured in their 2–0 loss at Sheffield Wednesday in the semi-final first leg.

In February 2017, Goldson was discovered to have a heart defect in a screening, and was sidelined for the remainder of the season to have preventative surgery. He played his first competitive game following his return from successful surgery in December 2017, playing the full 90 minutes in a 1–0 home win against Watford on his Premier League debut. Goldson was on the fringes of Brighton's team in 2017–18, totalling only eight appearances, but scored in their 3–1 home win over Coventry City in the FA Cup fifth round on 17 February 2018.

=== Rangers ===
On 13 June 2018, Goldson signed for Scottish Premiership club Rangers on a four-year deal, becoming Steven Gerrard's sixth summer signing. He made his competitive debut for Rangers on 12 July in a 2–0 2018–19 UEFA Europa League qualifier home win against Macedonian First Football League team FK Shkupi in what was Gerrard's first competitive fixture as manager. Goldson captained Rangers on 12 August in their 2–0 win over St. Mirren at Ibrox, as regular skipper James Tavernier was on the substitutes' bench. He headed his first goal for the club as they won with ten men, and he was praised by Gerrard after the match. On 17 October 2020, he scored a double in a 2–0 away win against Celtic in the Old Firm derby.

In 2020–21 Goldson featured in every competitive match Rangers played, making 56 appearances as Rangers won their maiden championship under the Premiership branding, their first top division title in a decade and their 55th overall, denying rivals Celtic what would have been a record-breaking 10th consecutive championship.

Goldson played the entire game in the 2022 UEFA Europa League final which Rangers lost on penalties to Eintracht Frankfurt; they won the Scottish Cup three days later, Goldson again completing 120 minutes of action. He signed a four-year contract extension on 1 June 2022.

=== Aris Limassol ===
On 30 July 2024, Goldson left Rangers to join Cypriot side Aris Limassol for an undisclosed fee.

=== Apollon Limassol ===
On 26 June 2026, Goldson signed a two-year contract with Apollon Limassol.

== Career statistics ==
As of match played 25 April 2026

Appearances and goals by club, season and competition
Club	Season	League			National cup (Note: Includes FA Cup, Scottish Cup, Cypriot Cup)		League cup (Note: Include League/EFL Cup, Scottish League Cup)		Europe		Other		Total	
Club	Season	Division	Apps	Goals	Apps	Goals	Apps	Goals	Apps	Goals	Apps	Goals	Apps	Goals
Shrewsbury Town	2010–11	League Two	3	0	0	0	0	0	–		0	0	3	0
Shrewsbury Town	2011–12	League Two	4	0	1	0	2	0	–		0	0	7	0
Shrewsbury Town	2012–13	League One	17	1	0	0	0	0	–		0	0	17	1
Shrewsbury Town	2013–14	League One	36	0	1	0	1	0	–		1 (Note: Appearance in Football League Trophy)	0	39	0
Shrewsbury Town	2014–15	League Two	44	7	3	0	4	0	–		0	0	51	7
Shrewsbury Town	2015–16	League One	2	0	—		1	0	–		—		3	0
Shrewsbury Town	Total		106	8	5	0	8	0	–		1	0	120	8
Cheltenham Town (loan)	2013–14	League Two	4	0	—		—		–		—		4	0
Brighton & Hove Albion	2015–16	Championship	24	2	1	0	—		–		1 (Note: Appearance in Championship play-offs)	0	26	2
Brighton & Hove Albion	2016–17	Championship	5	0	2	0	1	0	–		—		8	0
Brighton & Hove Albion	2017–18	Premier League	3	0	3	1	2	0	–		—		8	1
Brighton & Hove Albion	Total		32	2	6	1	3	0	–		1	0	42	3
Rangers	2018–19	Scottish Premiership	34	3	4	0	2	0	14 (Note: Appearances in UEFA Europa League)	1	–		54	4
Rangers	2019–20	Scottish Premiership	29	3	2	0	3	0	18	1	–		52	4
Rangers	2020–21	Scottish Premiership	38	4	3	0	2	1	13	3	–		56	8
Rangers	2021–22	Scottish Premiership	36	3	4	1	3	0	18 (Note: Two appearances in UEFA Champions League, sixteen appearances in UEFA Europa League)	0	–		61	4
Rangers	2022–23	Scottish Premiership	25	2	3	1	2	0	8 (Note: Appearances in UEFA Champions League)	0	–		38	3
Rangers	2023–24	Scottish Premiership	30	0	3	0	4	0	11 (Note: Four appearances in UEFA Champions League, four appearances in UEFA Europa League)	0	–		49	0
Rangers	Total		192	15	19	2	16	1	82	5	–		310	23
Aris Limassol	2024–25	Cypriot First Division	31	0	1	0	—		—		—		32	0
Aris Limassol	2025–26	Cypriot First Division	24	2	2	0	—		4 (Note: Appearances in UEFA Conference League)	1	—		30	3
Aris Limassol	Total		55	2	3	0	–		4	1	–		62	3
Career total			379	27	33	3	26	1	86	6	2	0	538	37

== Honours ==
Shrewsbury Town

- Football League Two runner-up: 2014–15

Brighton & Hove Albion

- EFL Championship runner-up: 2016–17

Rangers

- Scottish Premiership: 2020–21
- Scottish Cup: 2021–22
- Scottish League Cup: 2023–24;
- UEFA Europa League runner-up: 2021–22

Individual

- PFA Team of the Year: 2014–15 League Two
- PFA Scotland Team of the Year: 2020–21 Scottish Premiership
