= Aaron Wildig =

English footballer (born 1992)

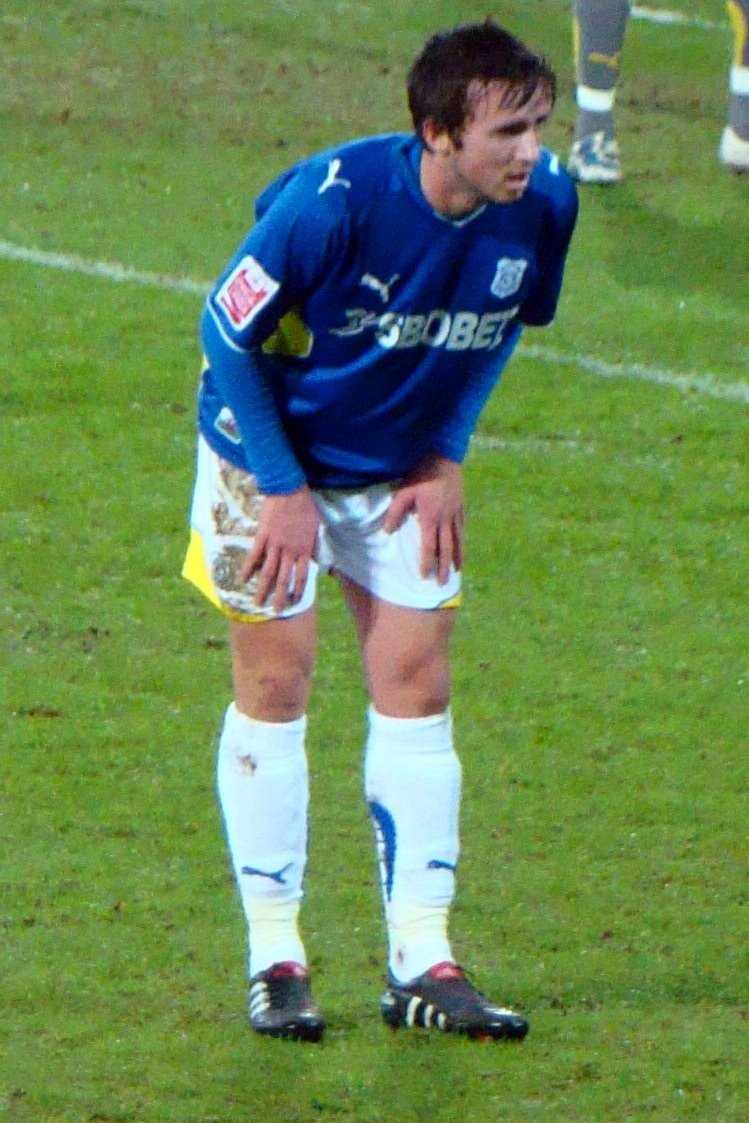
- Wildig playing for Cardiff City in 2010

Personal information
- Full name: Aaron Keith Wildig
- Date of birth: 15 April 1992 (age 34)
- Place of birth: Hereford, England
- Position: Midfielder

Team information
- Current team: Cardiff Met
- Number: 24

Youth career
- 2008–2009: Cardiff City

Senior career*
Years	Team	Apps	(Gls)
2009–2012	Cardiff City	13	(1)
2011	→ Hamilton Academical (loan)	3	(0)
2011–2012	→ Shrewsbury Town (loan)	12	(2)
2012–2015	Shrewsbury Town	52	(3)
2014–2015	→ Kidderminster Harriers (loan)	4	(0)
2015	→ Morecambe (loan)	9	(1)
2015–2022	Morecambe	204	(19)
2022–2025	Newport County	75	(9)
2025–?	Gloucester City		
2026–	Cardiff Met	12	(1)

International career
2008	Wales U16	3	(0)
- * Club domestic league appearances and goals as of 07:50, 8 November 2026 (UTC)

Aaron Keith Wildig (born 15 April 1992) is an English footballer who plays as a midfielder for Cymru Premier club Cardiff Met.

== Club career ==
=== Cardiff City ===
Wildig was born in Hereford, and began his career at Cardiff City, making his way through the club's youth system, including captaining the under-18 side. In April 2009, Wildig signed a professional contract at the club, before going on to make his professional debut at the start of the 2009–10 season, replacing Miguel Comminges during a 3–1 win over Dagenham & Redbridge in the first round of the League Cup on 11 August. He made two more appearances in the competition for Cardiff, in the second round win over Bristol Rovers and the third round defeat to Aston Villa. His league debut came nearly three months later when he replaced Riccardo Scimeca at half time during a 2–0 win over West Bromwich Albion on 8 December. He made his first start on 12 January 2010 in the FA Cup tie with rivals Bristol City, and then made his first league start on 16 January against Scunthorpe United. During his next league appearance, Wildig scored the first professional goal of his career during a 5–1 defeat to Newcastle United.

He moved on loan to Scottish Premier League club Hamilton Academical on 25 January 2011 until the end of the season. He made his debut 4 days later in a 1–1 draw with Kilmarock and made 3 more appearances before returning at the end of the season.

On 8 November 2011, he joined League Two side Shrewsbury Town on a loan. He made his debut for the club on 12 November, in a FA Cup match against Newport County. He scored his first goal on 19 November, in a 7–2 win over Northampton Town, however he suffered an ankle injury in the following game, which kept him out for the rest of the month. He extended his loan by an extra month on 8 December. On 17 January 2012, Wildig extended the loan again till the end of the season. Following a late season surge in form, he impressed Shrewsbury boss Graham Turner and following the club's promotion to League One, Turner offered Wildig a contract at Shrewsbury.

On 21 May 2012, Wildig was released by Cardiff along with six of his fellow players. He had spent a total of four years at the club, but he was not part of the future plans of new manager Malky Mackay.

=== Shrewsbury Town ===
On 29 May 2012, Wildig agreed a deal to join Shrewsbury Town on a free transfer. He made his debut as a contracted Shrewsbury player on 11 August 2012, in a League Cup match against Leeds United, where he was a substitute for fellow former Cardiff City player Joe Jacobson. He went on to make 21 league appearances that season, scoring once against Bury.

Wildig signed a one-year contract extension on 21 May 2013, and by playing an unspecified number of matches the following season triggered a clause to extend his contract for a further year. However, he went on loan to Kidderminster Harriers in January 2015 having not featured for Shrewsbury that season so far under new manager Micky Mellon.

Following the expiry of his loan, he returned to Shrewsbury Town, finally making his first appearance of the season, coming on as a substitute for Keith Southern in the 2–1 home defeat against Northampton Town. He then joined Morecambe on loan in March 2015.

It was announced on 8 May 2015 that Wildig would be released at the end of the season when his Shrewsbury contract expired.

=== Morecambe ===
Wildig joined former loan club Morecambe on a two-year contract on 6 June 2015. He signed a new one-year contract in June 2019.

=== Newport County ===
After turning down a new contract with Morecambe, Newport County announced the signing of Wildig on 6 June 2022. He made his debut for Newport on 30 July 2022 in the starting line up for the 1–1 League Two draw against Sutton United. Wildig scored his first goal for Newport on 24 August 2022 in the 3–2 EFL Cup second round win against Portsmouth. In June 2024 Wildig signed a one-year contract extension with Newport. He was offered a new contract by Newport at the end on the 2024-25 season but Wildig chose to leave.

=== Gloucester City ===
In June 2025 he joined Southern Football League club Gloucester City

=== Cardiff Met ===
In summer 2026 he joined Cardiff Met.

== International career ==
Despite being born in England, Wildig instead chose to play for Wales and represented the Under-16 side. It was later discovered, however, that Wildig did not qualify for Wales as his only Welsh relative is a great-great-great-grandfather and the international ruling on familial linkage only allows qualification through a parent or grandparent.

== Career statistics ==
=== Club ===
As of match played 12 December 2023

Appearances and goals by club, season and competition
Club	Season	League			National Cup		League Cup		Other		Total	
Club	Season	Division	Apps	Goals	Apps	Goals	Apps	Goals	Apps	Goals	Apps	Goals
Cardiff City	2009–10	Championship	11	1	3	0	3	0	0	0	17	1
Cardiff City	2010–11	Championship	2	0	1	0	1	0	0	0	4	0
Cardiff City	2011–12	Championship	0	0	0	0	0	0	0	0	0	0
Cardiff City	Total		13	1	4	0	4	0	0	0	21	1
Hamilton Academical (loan)	2010–11	Scottish Premier League	3	0	1	0	0	0	0	0	4	0
Shrewsbury Town (loan)	2011–12	League Two	12	2	1	0	0	0	0	0	13	2
Shrewsbury Town	2012–13	League One	21	1	1	0	1	0	1 (Note: Appearance(s) in the Football League Trophy)	0	24	1
Shrewsbury Town	2013–14	League One	30	2	1	0	1	1	1	0	33	3
Shrewsbury Town	2014–15	League Two	1	0	0	0	0	0	0	0	1	0
Shrewsbury Town	Total		64	5	3	0	2	1	2	0	71	6
Kidderminster Harriers (loan)	2014–15	Conference Premier	4	0	—		—		—		4	0
Morecambe (loan)	2014–15	League Two	9	1	—		—		—		9	1
Morecambe	2015–16	League Two	32	2	2	1	1	0	2	0	37	3
Morecambe	2016–17	League Two	28	2	2	0	0	0	2 (Note: Appearance(s) in the EFL Trophy)	0	32	2
Morecambe	2017–18	League Two	31	1	2	0	0	0	1	0	34	1
Morecambe	2018–19	League Two	26	1	2	0	1	0	1	0	30	1
Morecambe	2019–20	League Two	28	3	1	0	1	0	3	1	33	4
Morecambe	2020–21	League Two	37	8	3	0	2	1	4 (Note: One appearance in the EFL Trophy, three appearances and one goal in the EFL League Two play-offs)	1	46	10
Morecambe	2021–22	League One	22	2	2	1	0	0	3	0	27	3
Morecambe	Total		213	20	14	2	5	1	16	2	248	25
Newport County	2022–23	League Two	29	3	0	0	2	1	1	0	32	4
Newport County	2023–24	League Two	14	0	3	0	2	1	2	0	21	1
Newport County	Total		43	3	3	0	4	2	3	0	53	5
Career total			340	29	25	2	15	4	21	2	401	37

== Honours ==
Shrewsbury Town

- Football League Two runner-up: 2011–12

Morecambe

- EFL League Two play-offs: 2021
