= John Marsden (footballer) =

English footballer

Personal information
- Full name: John Edward Marsden
- Date of birth: 9 December 1992 (age 33)
- Place of birth: Liverpool, England
- Position: Forward

Youth career
- 2000–2004: Wrexham
- 2004–2008: Wigan Athletic
- 2009–2011: Celtic
- 2010–2011: → Hamilton Academical (loan)
- 2011: Rochdale

Senior career*
Years	Team	Apps	(Gls)
2011	Aberystwyth Town	2	(0)
2012–2013	Stockport Sports	31	(21)
2013	Stoke City	0	(0)
2013–2014	Shrewsbury Town	3	(0)
2014–2015	Southport	31	(5)
2015	→ Lincoln City (loan)	6	(0)
2015	Macclesfield Town	2	(0)
2015	Colwyn Bay		
2016–2017	Stockport County	40	(9)
2017	→ Telford United (loan)	5	(2)
2017–2018	Telford United	12	(2)
2018	Stalybridge Celtic	6	(0)
- * Club domestic league appearances and goals

John Edward Marsden (born 9 December 1992) is an English former footballer. He has previously played in the Football League for Shrewsbury Town, and had a nomadic career in non-league football.

== Career ==
Marsden played youth team football with Wrexham and Wigan Athletic, and was a prolific goal scorer for Liverpool Schoolboys at under-14 and under-15 levels. He joined Scottish club Celtic at the age of 16, signing a professional contract. He spent the 2010–11 season on loan to Hamilton Academical's youth team. Whilst at Celtic, Marsden suffered a broken foot, all but ending his chances of breaking into the first team, and was subsequently released. He moved on to Rochdale, playing on non-contract terms for their reserve side and scoring eight in 14 games. After a contract failed to materialise, however, he joined Welsh Premier League side Aberystwyth Town and then Stockport Sports.

After scoring 21 goals in 31 matches for Stockport Sports he earned a trial at Stoke City. His trial was successful and he signed a contract until the end of the 2012–13 season. Marsden failed to extend his stay at Stoke and joined Shrewsbury Town in July 2013 after a trial period. He made his professional debut in a goalless draw against Milton Keynes Dons on 3 August 2013, and appeared again in a League Cup defeat to Bolton Wanderers, but broke a bone in his foot early in the game, an injury which ruled him out for up to eight weeks. On 24 January 2014, Shrewsbury Town confirmed the departure of Marsden by mutual consent.

On 4 August 2014 Marsden joined Conference Premier side Southport. He moved on loan to Lincoln City for the rest of the season on 12 February 2015. He then had a short spell at Macclesfield Town, making two appearances in August 2015 before joining Welsh side Colwyn Bay.

Marsden joined Stockport County in January 2016.

In July 2018 he joined Stalybridge Celtic. He left the club in September 2018.

== Career statistics ==
As of match played 9 December 2017

Appearances and goals by club, season and competition
Club	Season	League			FA Cup		League Cup		Other		Total	
Club	Season	Division	Apps	Goals	Apps	Goals	Apps	Goals	Apps	Goals	Apps	Goals
Aberystwyth Town	2011–12	Welsh Premier League	2	0	0	0	0	0	0	0	2	0
Shrewsbury Town	2013–14	League One	3	0	1	0	1	0	0	0	5	0
Southport	2014–15	Conference Premier	31	5	4	1	—		2 (Note: Appearances in the FA Trophy)	0	37	6
Lincoln City (loan)	2014–15	Conference Premier	6	0	—		—		0	0	6	0
Macclesfield Town	2015–16	National League	2	0	0	0	—		0	0	2	0
Colwyn Bay	2015–16	NPL - Premier Division	?	?	?	?	—		?	?	?	?
Stockport County	2015–16	National League North	18	7	0	0	—		0	0	18	7
Stockport County	2016–17	National League North	22	2	2	0	—		3	0	27	2
Stockport County	Stockport total		40	9	2	0	0	0	3	0	45	9
Telford United (loan)	2016–17	National League North	5	2	—		—		0	0	5	2
Telford United	2017–18	National League North	12	2	1	0	—		1	0	14	2
Career total			101	18	8	1	1	0	6	0	116	19
