= Alex McQuade =

English footballer (born 1992)

Personal information
- Full name: Alexander Michael McQuade
- Date of birth: 7 November 1992 (age 34)
- Place of birth: Manchester, England
- Position: Defender

Team information
- Current team: Widnes

Youth career
- 2011−2013: Bolton Wanderers

Senior career*
Years	Team	Apps	(Gls)
2013−2014	Shrewsbury Town	1	(0)
2014	→ Hyde (loan)	10	(0)
2014	Guiseley		
2014−2015	Hyde	18	(0)
2015	Farsley		
2015−2016	Warrington Town		
2016	Banyule City	40	(0)
2017−2018	Ossett Albion		
2018−2019	Ossett United		
2019–2020	Buxton		
2019	→ Ossett Town (loan)		
2020–	Widnes	30	(0)

International career
2018–	Yorkshire	1	(0)
- * Club domestic league appearances and goals as of 18:02, 9 November 2020 (UTC)

Alexander Michael McQuade (born 7 November 1992) is an English footballer playing for Widnes. He had a short spell playing in the Football League for Shrewsbury Town.

== Career ==
=== Bolton Wanderers and Shrewsbury Town ===
McQuade began his career with Bolton Wanderers. Having progressed through the academy system, he signed a one-year professional contract in July 2012. He was released by the club when his contract was due to come to an end in the summer of 2013.

McQuade joined Shrewsbury Town in a deal announced in April 2013. He made his Football League debut as a late substitute in a 0–0 draw against Milton Keynes Dons on 3 August 2013.

On 28 February 2014, McQuade joined Conference side Hyde on an initial one-month loan. He made his debut for the club a day later, in a 2–1 defeat away at Braintree Town. The loan was later extended until the end of the season.

McQuade was released at the end of his contract in May 2014 having made only a single league appearance for Shrewsbury.

=== Non-league ===
In July 2014, McQuade joined Wrexham on trial and played in a 1–0 win over Swansea City under 21s in the Dragons' first pre season friendly, however he was not offered a contract. In the 2014-15 season he had short spells at Guiseley, former loan club Hyde, and Farsley. Ahead of the 2015−16 season, he joined Warrington Town.

McQuade emigrated to Australia in February 2016, spending time with Banyule City, before returning to English non-league football, joining Ossett Albion in December 2017. He then moved to Ossett's new team, Ossett United, in the summer of 2018. In June 2019, he joined Buxton FC. On 30 August 2019, he joined Ossett Town A.F.C. on a short-term loan. At the end of January 2020, McQuade joined Widnes.

== Career statistics ==
Last updated 27 April 2014.

Appearances and goals by club, season and competition
Club	Season	League			FA Cup		League Cup		Other ^{1}		Total	
Club	Season	Division	Apps	Goals	Apps	Goals	Apps	Goals	Apps	Goals	Apps	Goals
Shrewsbury Town	2013−14	League One	1	0	0	0	1	0	0	0	2	0
Hyde (loan)	2013−14	Conference Premier	10	0	0	0	0	0	0	0	10	0
Career total			11	0	0	0	1	0	0	0	12	0

^Note 1"Other" column denotes performances in Football League Trophy
