= Jermaine Grandison =

English footballer

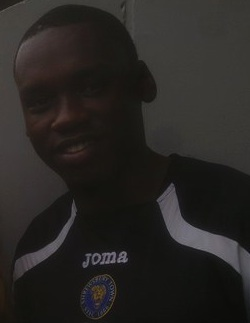
- Grandison with Shrewsbury Town in August 2011

Personal information
- Full name: Jermaine Mickel Grandison
- Date of birth: 5 December 1990 (age 35)
- Place of birth: Birmingham, England
- Height: 1.93 m (6 ft 4 in)
- Position: Defender

Youth career
- –2008: Coventry City

Senior career*
Years	Team	Apps	(Gls)
2008–2011	Coventry City	5	(0)
2010	→ Tranmere Rovers (loan)	5	(0)
2010–2011	→ Tranmere Rovers (loan)	3	(0)
2011	→ Shrewsbury Town (loan)	3	(0)
2011–2016	Shrewsbury Town	147	(5)
2016–2017	Colchester United	0	(0)
Total		163	(5)
- * Club domestic league appearances and goals

Jermaine Mickel Grandison (born 5 December 1990) is an English former professional footballer who played as a defender.

Grandison progressed through the youth system at Coventry City, making eight appearances for the first-team. He had three loan spells away from the club, twice at Tranmere Rovers in the 2010–11 season, and then Shrewsbury Town later in the same season. He joined Shrewsbury on a permanent basis following his loan, and over five years he played 174 games for the club. He was released in summer 2016, and joined Colchester United in December 2016. He left Colchester in March 2017 having failed to make a first-team appearance.

== Career ==
=== Coventry City ===
Born in Birmingham, Grandison is a product of the Coventry City youth system. He made his professional debut as a substitute on 25 April 2009 in a 3–2 Championship loss to Watford.

==== Tranmere Rovers loan ====
On 31 August 2010, Grandison completed a loan move to League One club Tranmere Rovers to gain first-team experience. The move was an initial one-month deal, with an option for a further extension. He made his debut the same day in a Football League Trophy match against Accrington Stanley. He returned to Coventry after his loan expired on 1 October, He returned to Tranmere on 29 October for a second loan spell following an injury, returning to his parent club on 3 January 2011.

=== Shrewsbury Town ===
On 14 January 2011, Grandison signed for League Two club Shrewsbury Town, initially on loan. However, on January transfer deadline day, he signed for the club permanently on a free transfer, on a 2 1/2-year contract. He made his debut after signing on loan on 18 January 2011, in a 3–1 away win against Accrington Stanley. He made his second debut after joining permanently in a 3–0 home win against Burton Albion on 1 February. On 12 March, Grandison received the first red card of his career during a 5–0 loss to promotion rivals Torquay United. He finished the campaign after making 15 appearances for Shrewsbury, including his three loan appearances.

Grandison scored his first professional goal in the 2011–12 season. On 21 January 2012, he scored a late header to win the game as his side beat Southend United 2–1. He helped Shrewsbury to promotion to the third tier of English football, making 43 appearances during the season.

Initially utilised at right-back by then manager Graham Turner, Grandison was increasingly used as a central defender in the 2012–13 season and was almost ever-present in the side until he picked up a pelvic injury in January 2013, making only one more appearance thereafter.

Having failed to come to an agreement over a new contract in the close season, Grandison was released by Shrewsbury Town, although they were obliged to work with him until he fully recovered from long-term injury. However, having carried out his rehabilitation at the club and coming through 45-minutes of a reserve match against Port Vale unscathed, Grandison agreed to rejoin the club on 3 December 2013. He agreed a deal until the end of the 2013–14 season with Shrewsbury holding the option for a further year. He made his return to first-team action on 7 January 2014 as a substitute in Shrewsbury's 2–0 home defeat by Leyton Orient.

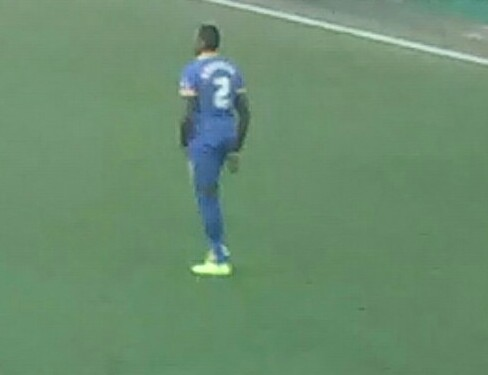
Grandison playing for Shrewsbury Town in February 2015

Despite Shrewsbury suffering relegation back to League Two, both player and club opted to exercise their option to extend Grandison's contract to the end of the 2014–15 season on 13 May 2014. Initially left out of the team by new manager Micky Mellon, Grandison made his first appearance of the season in a League Cup second round tie against Premier League side Leicester City on 26 August 2014, which Shrewsbury won 1–0. Three weeks later, he scored his first senior goal in two years with the winner at home against Carlisle United. Grandison helped Shrewsbury win promotion to League One for the second time in his career following a 1–0 win over Cheltenham Town on 25 April 2015.

Grandison signed a one-year contract extension, funded by club chairman Roland Wycherley in August 2015, but was released at the end of the season having made 150 league appearances for the club over six seasons.

=== Colchester United ===
After leaving Shrewsbury in the summer of 2016, Grandison joined Colchester United on trial, where he impressed in Colchester's under-23 matches. He agreed to sign a contract until the end of the 2016–17 season on 22 December 2016. After picking up a hip injury which ruled him out of contention for much of his time at the club, Grandison was released in March 2017, failing to make a first-team appearance for Colchester.

== Style of play ==
Grandison can perform in a variety of defensive positions - at right-back, centre-back or as a sweeper. Former Shrewsbury manager Graham Turner identified before the 2012–13 season:

He has got size, power and pace, as well as the ability on the ball. He had a good season at full back last season and we shouldn't dismiss his ability to get forward and provide us with chances... Ultimately, he will be a central defender and an outstanding one at that.

He is known to regularly perform step overs during matches, and also posting videos of himself singing onto social media, which established him as a cult figure amongst Shrewsbury supporters.

== Career statistics ==
As of match played 2 April 2016.

Appearances and goals by club, season and competition
Club	Season	League			FA Cup		League Cup		Other		Total	
Club	Season	Division	Apps	Goals	Apps	Goals	Apps	Goals	Apps	Goals	Apps	Goals
Coventry City	2008–09	Championship	2	0	0	0	0	0	–		2	0
Coventry City	2009–10	Championship	3	0	1	0	1	0	–		5	0
Coventry City	2010–11	Championship	0	0	0	0	1	0	–		1	0
Coventry City	Total		5	0	1	0	2	0	–		8	0
Tranmere Rovers (loan)	2010–11	League One	8	0	0	0	–		3 (Note: Appearance(s) in Football League Trophy)	0	11	0
Shrewsbury Town (loan) (Note: Grandison initially arrived at Shrewsbury Town on loan from Coventry City on 14 January 2011, and transferred permanently on 31 January 2011. Soccerbase incorrectly states that his loan ran until the end of the 2010–11 season.)	2010–11	League Two	3	0	0	0	–		0	0	3	0
Shrewsbury Town	2010–11	League Two	10	0	0	0	–		2 (Note: Appearances in English Football League play-offs)	0	12	0
Shrewsbury Town	2011–12	League Two	38	2	1	0	3	0	1	0	43	2
Shrewsbury Town	2012–13	League One	30	1	1	0	1	0	1	0	33	1
Shrewsbury Town	2013–14	League One	14	0	0	0	0	0	0	0	14	0
Shrewsbury Town	2014–15	League Two	36	2	2	0	3	0	1	0	42	2
Shrewsbury Town	2015–16	League One	19	0	4	0	2	0	2	0	27	0
Shrewsbury Town	Total		147	5	8	0	9	0	7	0	171	5
Colchester United	2016–17	League Two	0	0	0	0	0	0	0	0	0	0
Career total			163	5	9	0	11	0	10	0	193	5

== Honours ==
Shrewsbury Town

- Football League Two runner-up: 2011–12, 2014–15
