= Marvin Morgan =

English footballer (1983–2021)

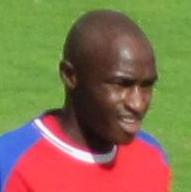
- Morgan playing for Aldershot Town in 2011

Personal information
- Full name: Marvin Newton Morgan
- Date of birth: 13 April 1983
- Place of birth: Manchester, England
- Date of death: 6 December 2021 (aged 38)
- Height: 6 ft 4 in (1.93 m)
- Position: Forward

Youth career
- Wealdstone

Senior career*
Years	Team	Apps	(Gls)
2000–2004	Wealdstone	187	(56)
2001	→ Berkhamsted Town (loan)		
2002	→ Berkhamsted Town (loan)		
2004–2007	Yeading	94	(39)
2007–2008	Woking	42	(10)
2008–2011	Aldershot Town	93	(25)
2011	→ Dagenham & Redbridge (loan)	12	(0)
2011–2013	Shrewsbury Town	82	(15)
2013–2015	Plymouth Argyle	37	(2)
2015	→ Hartlepool United (loan)	5	(1)
2015–2017	Havant & Waterlooville	19	(0)
2016	→ Wealdstone (loan)	8	(1)
2016–2017	→ Bath City (loan)	38	(9)
2017	Bath City	11	(2)
2017	Hampton & Richmond Borough	2	(0)
2017–2018	Bath City	8	(1)
2018	Hendon	4	(0)
2018–2019	Beaconsfield Town	16	(5)
2019	Potters Bar Town	6	(1)
2019	Wingate & Finchley	7	(0)
2019–2020	Hornchurch	12	(1)
2020–2021	Potters Bar Town	5	(1)
Total		688	(169)
- * Club domestic league appearances and goals

Marvin Newton Morgan (13 April 1983 – 6 December 2021) was an English professional footballer who played as a forward. He played in the Football League for Aldershot Town, Dagenham & Redbridge, Shrewsbury Town, Plymouth Argyle and Hartlepool United. He was also the founder of the fashion brand Fresh Ego Kid.

== Career ==
=== Non-League ===
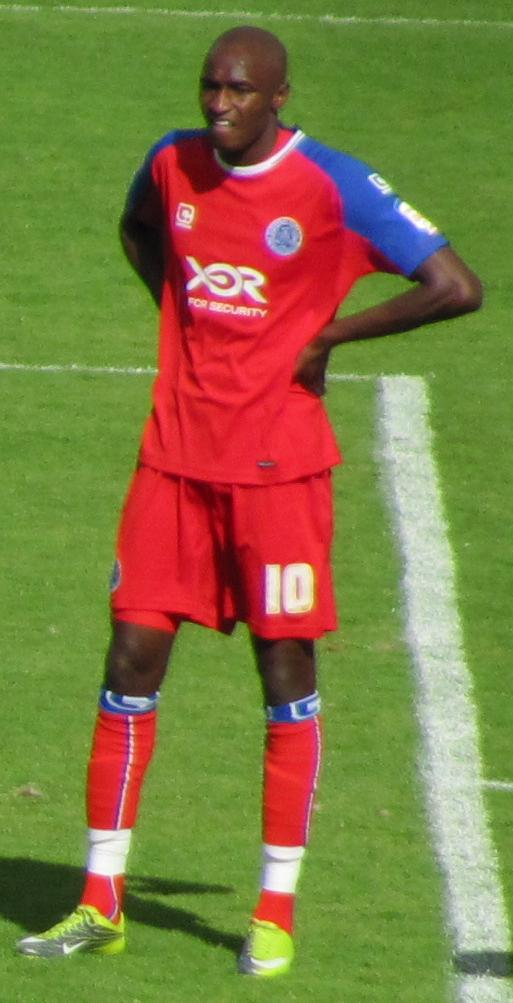
Morgan playing for Aldershot Town in 2011

Born in Manchester, Morgan started his career in the youth team at Wealdstone before signing a contract in March 2000, and becoming the club's youngest ever goalscorer against Leatherhead a month later. Morgan also had two loan spells at Berkhamsted Town, making a total of eight appearances. Morgan started Wealdstone's 2004 playoff final victory against Dulwich Hamlet and made a total of 187 appearances in his first spell at the club, scoring 56 times. He joined Yeading in November 2004 for a fee of £3,000 and scored eight league goals that season as Yeading won the Isthmian League Premier Division. In the 2006–07 season, Morgan scored 25 goals for Yeading and was the club's top scorer. Whilst at Yeading, he was nicknamed "The Sticks". Morgan played in 94 league games during three seasons with the club and scored 39 goals. In May 2007, he joined the Conference National side Woking.

=== Football League ===
In May 2008, Morgan signed for the Conference National champions and newly promoted League Two side Aldershot Town for an undisclosed fee. This fee although undisclosed, was a record fee paid by Aldershot Town for any player. Morgan made his Football League debut in Aldershot Town's first-ever Football League match, away to Accrington Stanley on 9 August 2008. He scored Aldershot Town's first-ever League Cup goal in the 3–1 defeat at Coventry City in the first round of the 2008–09 competition. He scored his first Football League goal at home to Bradford City on 30 August 2008. Morgan finished season 2008–09 at the Shots having scored seven goals in all competitions. He played in all but seven games in season 2009–10 and finished the campaign having top-scored with 16 goals in all competitions.

==== Controversy ====
After the 2–1 defeat to Hereford United on 3 January 2011, Morgan posted the following message on Twitter: "Like to thank the fans who booed me off the pitch. Where's that going to get you! I hope you all die." Following that, he was transfer-listed, being eventually signed by League One club Dagenham & Redbridge on loan until the end of the season. At the end of the season, he was one of seven players to be released by Aldershot Town.

=== Shrewsbury Town ===
Morgan joined Shrewsbury Town following his release from Aldershot and started the opening game of the League Two season against Plymouth Argyle on 6 August 2011. He was replaced by Terry Gornell in the 88th minute following a knock to the head. Three days later, in Shrewsbury's Football League Cup encounter with Derby County, Morgan scored two goals to help his side to a 3–2 away win.

At the end of the 2011–12 season Morgan had scored 11 goals to help in Shrewsbury Town's promotion to League One. He was released at the end of the 2012–13 season having only scored seven goals.

=== Plymouth Argyle ===
Morgan signed a two-year contract with Plymouth Argyle in July 2013, and made his debut in the club's first game of the new season at Southend United.

On 17 August 2013, Morgan scored his first goal for Argyle heading home The Pilgrims' first in 3–1 win away at Cheltenham Town. This however was to be Morgan's only goal of the 2013–14 season as shoulder surgery forced him to sit out four months of the campaign, and a 'mini-seizure' brought his season to a premature end.

Morgan scored his first goal of the 2014–15 season in a 2–0 win over Hartlepool United on 20 September 2014 and celebrated the goal in the style of Bebeto as a tribute to his son who was born earlier in the week. Morgan doubled his tally for the whole of the previous season on 8 November 2014, scoring Argyle's second in the 2–0 win over AFC Fylde in the FA Cup first round.

On 2 February 2015, Morgan signed for Hartlepool on loan until the end of the season. He played 5 times for the Pools, with his only goal coming in a 1–0 home win over Northampton Town on 10 February. He was released by Plymouth at the end of the season.

=== Return to non-League ===
Following his release from Plymouth, Morgan returned to non-League football, joining Havant & Waterlooville of the National League South in June 2015. He re-joined former club Wealdstone on loan in February 2016, and then secured a full season loan to Bath City ahead of the following season. He re-signed with Bath City in July 2017. On 20 June 2018, Morgan signed for Hendon. Morgan was released by the club on 25 October 2018, following an incident involving fellow player Laste Dombaxe and a machete. Later that season Morgan played for Beaconsfield Town and Potters Bar Town. The following season, he played for Wingate & Finchley and Hornchurch before returning to Potters Bar.

== Personal life ==
Morgan was in a 14 year relationship with Jerri Fletcher prior to his death. Their son was seven years old when Morgan died.

Morgan collapsed twice in April 2014, while a Plymouth player. He was diagnosed with cavernoma, an abnormality of blood vessels in the brain. He required medication for the rest of his life.

Morgan set up Fresh Ego Kid, a streetwear fashion brand, whilst at Shrewsbury Town. Which he regularly promoted on his social channels. The brand has become a favourite of footballers and celebrities including Romelu Lukaku, Kieran Trippier, Harry Maguire, Cruz Beckham, Marvin Humes and Aston Merrygold. Fresh Ego Kid is stocked in Footlocker, House of Fraser and Sports Direct. The flagship store is on Fairfax Road in London.

Morgan also set up Fresh Ego FC, the official football team of Fresh Ego Kid, to raise awareness of issues surrounding mental health and racism, engaging local communities and young people to inspire change and raising money for charities to continue their great work.

== Death ==
Morgan died on 6 December 2021, aged 38, due to complications from his cavernoma. Tributes were paid by a number of Morgan's former clubs and fellow footballers. According to his partner, he was on a business trip abroad for his fashion brand.

== Career statistics ==
As of on 15 May 2015.

Appearances and goals by club, season and competition
Club	Season	League			FA Cup		League Cup		Other		Total	
Club	Season	Division	Apps	Goals	Apps	Goals	Apps	Goals	Apps	Goals	Apps	Goals
Wealdstone	2004–05	Isthmian League Premier Division	10	1	2	0	0	0	0	0	10	1
Yeading	2004–05	Isthmian League Premier Division	23	8	0	0	0	0	0	0	23	8
Yeading	2005–06	Conference South	33	12	0	0	0	0	0	0	33	12
Yeading	2006–07	Conference South	38	18	1	0	0	0	2	1	41	19
Woking	2007–08	Conference Premier	42	10	0	0	0	0	3	2	45	12
Aldershot Town	2008–09	League Two	32	5	3	1	1	1	1	0	37	7
Aldershot Town	2009–10	League Two	42	15	3	0	1	1	0	0	46	16
Aldershot Town	2010–11	League Two	19	5	2	0	1	0	0	0	22	5
Dagenham & Redbridge (loan)	2010–11	League One	12	0	0	0	0	0	0	0	12	0
Shrewsbury Town	2011–12	League Two	42	8	3	0	3	3	1	0	49	11
Shrewsbury Town	2012–13	League One	40	7	1	0	1	0	1	0	43	7
Plymouth Argyle	2013–14	League Two	21	1	0	0	1	0	1	0	23	1
Plymouth Argyle	2014–15	League Two	16	1	1	1	1	0	1	0	19	2
Hartlepool United (loan)	2014–15	League Two	5	1	0	0	0	0	0	0	5	1
Career total			375	92	16	2	9	5	10	3	408	102
