= Danny Taylor (footballer) =

English footballer

Personal information
- Date of birth: 1 September 1991 (age 35)
- Place of birth: Chester, England
- Height: 1.78 m (5 ft 10 in)
- Position: Defender

Youth career
- 2006–2010: Shrewsbury Town

Senior career*
Years	Team	Apps	(Gls)
2010–2011	Shrewsbury Town	2	(0)
2011–2012	Airbus UK Broughton	33	(0)
2012–2014	Colwyn Bay	60	(0)
2014	Chester	4	(0)
2014–2015	Colwyn Bay	18	(0)
2015–2018	Llandudno	77	(2)
2018–2019	Airbus UK Broughton		
- * Club domestic league appearances and goals as of 15:14, 1 February 2018 (UTC)

Danny George Taylor (born 1 September 1991) is an English footballer.

== Playing career ==
Taylor began his career at Shrewsbury Town. He made his home debut as an 18th minute substitute for Dean Holden in a 2–1 victory over Dagenham & Redbridge at the New Meadow on 23 January 2010. Seven days later he won his second start making this his full home debut in the 1–0 home defeat by Accrington Stanley. The teenager was praised for his two performances. At the end of the season he signed his first professional contract. He was released on 23 May 2011.

In July 2011 he joined Airbus UK where he played until he left the club by mutual consent at the end of September 2012.

The following month he joined Colwyn Bay.

Taylor joined Conference National club Chester on 2 June 2014. He re-joined Colwyn Bay in November.
