= Mark Wright (footballer, born 1982) =

English footballer

Personal information
- Full name: Mark Anthony Wright
- Date of birth: 24 February 1982 (age 44)
- Place of birth: Wolverhampton, England
- Position: Midfielder

Senior career*
Years	Team	Apps	(Gls)
2000–2007	Walsall	124	(9)
2001–2002	→ Nuneaton Borough (loan)	5	(0)
2007–2009	Milton Keynes Dons	66	(18)
2009	Brighton & Hove Albion	3	(0)
2009–2011	Bristol Rovers	24	(0)
2010–2011	→ Shrewsbury Town (loan)	24	(11)
2011–2013	Shrewsbury Town	84	(14)
2013–2014	Tamworth	14	(1)
2015–2016	Stourbridge	0	(0)
Total		344	(53)
- * Club domestic league appearances and goals

Mark Anthony Wright (born 24 February 1982 in Wolverhampton) is an English former professional footballer.

== Playing career ==
=== Walsall ===
Wright is a product of Walsall's youth system, and aside from a short spell at Nuneaton Borough for some first-team experience, he plied his trade steadily at the Bescot Stadium with Walsall for seven years.

His first appearance in a Walsall shirt came as a late substitute in the 1–1 draw at West Ham United in the 2000–01 League Cup second round. Despite a further handful of substitute appearances he did not make the side regularly, and the 2001–02 season saw him spend some time at Nuneaton Borough. Wright was judged ready for stand-in starting action in 2002, and finally cemented his place in the team by the beginning of 2004.

=== Milton Keynes Dons ===
Mark was released by Walsall in May 2007, and subsequently joined Milton Keynes Dons. At Milton Keynes he enjoyed arguably the best season of his career, netting 13 goals from the right wing, many of them crucial. He finished the 2007/08 season as Milton Keynes' top goalscorer, as the Dons won both the League Two title and the Football League Trophy.

=== Brighton & Hove Albion ===
On 19 June 2009, Wright signed a two-year contract at League One rivals Brighton & Hove Albion. After failing to settle in the area, Wright transferred to Bristol Rovers for an undisclosed fee on transfer deadline day, 1 September 2009.

However, he has also struggled to settle with his new club, and as a result, he was transfer-listed at the end of the season.

==== Shrewsbury Town (loan) ====
On 16 July 2010, it was announced he would be loaned to Shrewsbury Town. On 23 November 2010, he scored a hat-trick in a 4–0 win for Shrewsbury Town against Hereford United.

=== Shrewsbury Town ===
In the transfer window of January, Wright signed for Shrewsbury Town for an undisclosed fee, on a deal taking him to the end of the 2012/13 season.

In all, Wright amassed over 80 appearances for Shrewsbury Town, including playing a pivotal part in their promotion back to League One in 2012.

The following season was hampered by injury and Wright was limited to only a handful of appearances after Christmas.

In May 2013, after the expiration of his contract, Wright left Shrewsbury Town.

=== Tamworth ===
On 5 September 2013, Wright joined Conference National side Tamworth; the deal was highlighted as a short-term deal, as it was deemed that Wright was looking to continue his career in the Football League, but following a difficult summer period failing to find a new club, Wright decided to join Tamworth in a bid to get himself back in the shop window.

Following 14 appearances and one goal, Wright left Tamworth on 6 January 2014.

=== Stourbridge ===
On 2 October 2015 Wright signed for Northern Premier League side Stourbridge.

== Honours ==
Walsall

- Football League Two: 2006–07

Milton Keynes Dons

- Football League Two: 2007–08
- Football League Trophy: 2007–08

Shrewsbury Town

- Football League Two second-place promotion: 2011–12
