= Graham Turner =

English footballer

Personal information
- Date of birth: 5 October 1947 (age 79)
- Place of birth: Ellesmere Port, England
- Height: 5 ft 10 in (1.78 m)
- Position: Centre back

Senior career*
Years	Team	Apps	(Gls)
1964–1968	Wrexham	77	(0)
1968–1973	Chester	218	(5)
1973–1983	Shrewsbury Town	355	(22)
Total		650	(27)

Managerial career
- 1978–1984: Shrewsbury Town
- 1984–1986: Aston Villa
- 1986–1994: Wolverhampton Wanderers
- 1995–2009: Hereford United
- 2010: Hereford United
- 2010–2014: Shrewsbury Town
- * Club domestic league appearances and goals

Graham John Turner (born 5 October 1947) is an English former footballer who became a manager. His son Mark was also a professional footballer. He is fourth behind only Alex Ferguson, Neil Warnock and Arsène Wenger in terms of most games managed.

After a 19-year career as a central defender in the lower divisions, he became manager of Shrewsbury Town. After winning the Third Division, he oversaw five seasons in the Second Division before being appointed manager of Aston Villa. With little success in two years, he was sacked and went to Wolves whom he took from the Fourth Division to the Second Division, winning the Football League Trophy along the way.

He left in 1994 and had a year out of football before his arrival at Hereford United. A run to the Division Three play-offs was a false dawn, and a year later the Bulls were relegated to the Conference. Having initially resigned, Turner ended up buying the majority shareholding and becoming chairman in 1998. Five financially troubled seasons followed in non-league football, before he led the Bulls to three consecutive runners-up spots and promotion in 2006.

After a mid-table finish in the 2006–07 season, Turner delivered another promotion the following season with a third-place finish in League Two; notably making full use of the loan system. Turner was voted League Two Manager of the Year by the League Managers Association, but was unable to lead the Bulls to survival in League One. He subsequently stepped down as manager of Hereford on 24 April 2009, after 13 years 8 months and 723 matches in charge, and resumed the role after the sacking of his successor 11 months later.

== Playing career ==
Turner was born in Ellesmere Port and was an England youth international. He started his playing career at Wrexham before moving to rivals Chester in January 1968 in part-exchange for Ian Moir. Five years and 218 Football League appearances later he moved to his third and final club Shrewsbury Town for £30,000. Having played as a midfielder for his first two clubs, he switched to centre back. He went on to make over 350 league appearances for the Salopians. During the 1970s he played against Hereford United several times, the club he was later to buy.

== Managerial career ==
=== Shrewsbury Town ===
He became player-manager for the Shrews in the 1978–79 season, the same year the club sealed the Third Division championship. Shrewsbury ultimately spent ten seasons in the Second Division and Turner twice led them to the quarter-finals of the FA Cup. He ended his playing career in 1983, and left Shrewsbury after six seasons.

=== Aston Villa ===
Graham Turner took charge of Aston Villa in the summer of 1984. Despite the club's recent success, transfer resources were limited and Turner's brief was to generate his own team-building resources through wheeling and dealing. Turner's time at Villa Park was less successful. He was dismissed on 14 September 1986, just over two years after his appointment, with the club facing relegation from the First Division.

=== Wolverhampton Wanderers ===
He was then appointed manager of Wolverhampton Wanderers, a club then in the Fourth Division and massively in financial trouble (barely out of debt), on 7 October 1986. In his first season Wolves reached the play-offs but failed to secure promotion. However the following two seasons brought successive promotions with the help of goalscorer Steve Bull and striking partner Andy Mutch. Mid-table finishes in the Second Division, and subsequently (following the formation of the Premier League) Division One, followed before he left in March 1994. There had been speculation about his future as manager more than two years earlier after a dismal start to the 1991–92 season, but a turnaround in form preserved his job for a while.

He also led Wolves to glory at Wembley in the 1987–88 Associate Members' Cup.

=== Hereford United ===
He was appointed manager of Hereford United for the start of the 1995–96 season, then in Division Three. His first season was a success, reaching the FA Cup third round and the play-offs, losing over two legs to Darlington. But the club was in financial trouble before his arrival and he was unable to retain several key players for the following season. On 3 May 1997, Hereford were relegated to the Conference after a 1–1 draw with Brighton & Hove Albion. Having seen his resignation rejected, he oversaw a sixth-place finish in the Conference and, when chairman Peter Hill resigned, he purchased the majority shareholding in the club in partnership with Joan Fennessy — thus saving it from going under.

With the bank balance firmly in the red he had to endure several fruitless seasons in the Conference and had to sell key players to keep the club in business. The financial situation was becoming desperate early in the 2001–02 season. After a humiliating defeat to Hayes, Turner handed first team duties over to player-coach Phil Robinson while he concentrated on securing the club's financial future. When Hereford finished 17th at the end of the season, it appeared enough was enough and Turner handed in his resignation to the board. But after several discussions he again decided to continue to remain at the club, despite the deadline to repay the debt looming large.

2002–03 proved the turning point with Turner taking the opportunity to build an entirely new squad, retaining only six players from the previous season. The team, built entirely of free transfers, evolved into one of the best footballing sides in the Conference, finishing second in a record-breaking 2003–04 season. But Hereford faltered in the play-off semi final against Aldershot Town, with crucial decisions going against them. Another runners-up spot and play-off failure came the following season but the 2005–06 season proved third time lucky when Hereford defeated Halifax Town in the 2006 Conference play-off final, to secure promotion to the Football League. After the match, Turner said his overwhelming feeling was "relief" after many hard seasons in the Conference. Hereford survived their first season back in the Football League in 16th position. The 2007–08 saw Turner make full use of the loan system, without paying any transfer fees. Hereford placed consistently in the top 5 all season and achieved promotion to the league's third tier for the first time in 30 years.

Having finally gained the promotion he had come close to in 1995–96, Turner again used the loan system in League One, purchasing only one player for an undisclosed fee. However this strategy was not nearly as successful in 2008–09 as the Bulls struggled in League One and were relegated on 18 April 2009. Turner subsequently announced he was stepping down as manager, having apologised for the season's performance. On 24 April 2009, as chairman, he appointed John Trewick as his successor.

Turner remained chairman, director of football and majority shareholder of Hereford United until the end of the 2009–10 season. His time in charge saw him stabilise the club's finances, turning a profit for the last six seasons. In his near 14 season spell at Hereford he purchased just three players: Neil Grayson (£20,000 in 1997), Ben Smith (£20,000 in 2007) and Matt Done (undisclosed in 2008) although Toumani Diagouraga arrived on a permanent transfer as part of the sale of Lionel Ainsworth to Watford. On 8 March 2010 Hereford United announced that they had dismissed John Trewick with Turner taking the reins on a temporary basis. On 16 April 2010 Turner said that he and co-chairperson Joan Fennessy would sell their shares in the club, stating that the club needed fresh impetus to take it forward. His subsequent decision to return to Shrewsbury Town seems to have influenced his decision.

=== Return to Shrewsbury Town ===
On 11 June 2010, Turner was announced as the new Shrewsbury Town manager, returning 26 years after he originally left. Turner agreed a three-year deal as manager, and will have the option of an extra year as director of football. His first season back at Shrewsbury Town was during the 2010–11 season saw them finish just below automatic promotion in fourth place, this meant that Town had to play a two legged play-off semi final against Torquay United in which they lost 2–0 on aggregate. The following season Turner guided Shrewsbury Town to a runners-up spot and automatic promotion to League One. The club set a record number of points and were unbeaten at home throughout the season.

After guiding them to a respectable 16th-place finish in the 2012–13 season, their first 3rd tier appearance in 15 years, Turner was unable to build on this success the following season. On 21 January 2014, Turner resigned as manager of Shrewsbury Town, halfway through the 2013–14 campaign. Shrewsbury were subsequently relegated.

== Managerial statistics ==
Team	From	To	Record				
Team	From	To	G	W	D	L	Win %
Shrewsbury Town	1 November 1978	1 July 1984	279	101	81	97	36.20
Aston Villa	16 July 1984	14 September 1986	107	34	30	43	31.78
Wolverhampton Wanderers	7 October 1986	16 March 1994	412	179	109	124	43.45
Hereford United	1 August 1995	24 April 2009	723	288	194	241	39.83
Hereford United (caretaker)	8 March 2010	11 June 2010	12	7	0	5	58.33
Shrewsbury Town	11 June 2010	21 January 2014	185	73	49	63	39.46
Total			1,718	682	463	573	39.70

== Honours ==
Shrewsbury Town

- Football League Third Division: 1978–79
- Football League Two second-place promotion: 2011–12
- Welsh Cup: 1978–79, 1983–84

Wolverhampton Wanderers

- Football League Third Division: 1988–89
- Football League Fourth Division: 1987–88
- Associate Members' Cup: 1987–88

Hereford United

- Football League Two third-place promotion: 2007–08
- Conference National play-offs: 2006

Individual

- Football Conference Manager of the Month: December 2002
- Football League Two Manager of the Month: February 2011, April 2012

=== Personal honours ===
In October 2010, Graham received an award from the City of Hereford giving him Freedom of the city.

== See also ==
- List of football managers with the most matches
