= 2014–15 Cheltenham Town F.C. season =

Cheltenham Town
2014–15 season
- Chairman: Paul Baker
- Manager: Mark Yates (until 25 November); Paul Buckle (until 13 February); Russell Milton (until 30 March); Gary Johnson (from 30 March)
- Stadium: Whaddon Road
- League Two: 23rd (relegated)
- FA Cup: Second round
- League Cup: First round
- League Trophy: Second round
- Top goalscorer: League: Wes Burns (4); Byron Harrison (4); All: Byron Harrison (7)
- Highest home attendance: 5,117 vs Shrewsbury Town (25 April)
- Lowest home attendance: 2,122 vs Morecambe (16 January)
- Average home league attendance: 2,864 (21st in the league)
Home colours	Away colours

The 2014–15 season was the 75th season of competitive association football since joining Southern Football League in 1935 and the 16th season in the Football League played by Cheltenham Town Football Club, a professional football club based in Cheltenham, Gloucestershire. Following relegation from League One in 2008–09 season it was the 6th consecutive season in League Two.

Mark Yates started his fifth full season as the club manager. The summer transfer window saw eight players join the club, while eight players including veteran striker Jamie Cureton and long-served first-choice goalkeeper Scott Brown left the club.

Cheltenham Town started the season brightly, going top of the league after a draw at Morecambe on 6 September. The Robins won five games of eight in all competitions, losing only League Cup tie to Championship side Brighton & Hove Albion.

However, during September club's form deteriorated as Cheltenham failed to win a match till 18 October. On 25 November, following fourth straight league defeat, club have parted company with Yates, with immediate effect. The next day ex-Luton Town manager Paul Buckle was appointed as his replacement on a one-year contract.

The managerial change did not affect the results as the Robins lost to Conference National side Dover Athletic in the FA Cup and continued to struggle in the league. On 13 February another losing streak saw Buckle leave Cheltenham on mutual consent after only one victory in 13 games. Head of Academy Coaching Russell Milton took charge as a caretaker manager.

On 30 March with the club bottom of the table Milton stepped down to an assistant role after ex-Yeovil Town manager Gary Johnson was appointed with seven games until the end of the season. As both of his predecessors, Johnson managed to win only one game and following the home defeat against Shrewsbury Town on a penultimate day of the season Cheltenham Town were relegated to the National League.

Despite poor performances, on 29 April it was announced that Gary Johnson signed two-year contract with Cheltenham Town aiming to an immediate return to the Football League.

== Background and pre-season ==
=== Pre-season matches ===
11 July 2014	Cheltenham Town	1–3	Wolverhampton Wanderers	Cheltenham
19:45	Richards 60'	CTFC Report	Sako 35' (pen.); Edwards 37'; Clarke 49'	Stadium: Whaddon Road; Attendance: 1,705

12 July 2014	Evesham United	1–1	Cheltenham Town	Evesham
15:00	Edenborough 9'	CTFC Report	Haworth 90+1'	Stadium: Spiers and Hartwell Jubilee Stadium; Attendance: 454

15 July 2014	Cheltenham Town	1–0	Bristol Rovers	Cheltenham
19:45	Harrison 74'	CTFC Report		Stadium: Whaddon Road; Attendance: 762

18 July 2014	Leamington	1–2	Cheltenham Town	Whitnash
19:45	Goddard 61'	CTFC Report	Williams 38'; Richards 72'	Stadium: New Windmill Ground; Referee: Ben Cooke

26 July 2014	Bath City	1–1	Cheltenham Town	Twerton
15:00	Stearn 38'	CTFC Report	Richards 76' (pen.)	Stadium: Twerton Park

29 July 2014	Cheltenham Town	1–4	Bristol City	Cheltenham
19:45	Richards 22' (pen.)	CTFC Report	Baldock 15'; Wilbraham 67'; Bryan 73'; Flint 77'	Stadium: Whaddon Road; Attendance: 1,570

== League Two ==
=== League table ===
Pos	Team	Pld	W	D	L	GF	GA	GD	Pts	Promotion, qualification or relegation
20	Carlisle United	46	14	8	24	56	74	−18	50	
21	Mansfield Town	46	13	9	24	38	62	−24	48	
22	Hartlepool United	46	12	9	25	39	70	−31	45	
23	Cheltenham Town (R)	46	9	14	23	40	67	−27	41	Relegation to the National League
24	Tranmere Rovers (R)	46	9	12	25	45	67	−22	39	Relegation to the National League

Updated to match(es) played on 23 May 2015. Source: BBC Sport
Rules for classification: 1) Points; 2) Goal difference; 3) Number of goals scored
(R) Relegated

Overall								Home						Away					
Pld	W	D	L	GF	GA	GD	Pts	W	D	L	GF	GA	GD	W	D	L	GF	GA	GD
46	9	14	23	40	67	−27	41	5	8	10	22	30	−8	4	6	13	18	37	−19

Last updated: 3 May 2015.
Source: Football League Official Site

=== Results by matchday ===
Round	1	2	3	4	5	6	7	8	9	10	11	12	13	14	15	16	17	18	19	20	21	22	23	24	25	26	27	28	29	30	31	32	33	34	35	36	37	38	39	40	41	42	43	44	45	46
Ground	A	H	H	A	H	A	A	H	H	A	H	A	H	A	A	H	A	H	H	A	H	A	H	A	A	H	H	A	H	A	H	A	H	A	H	A	A	H	H	A	H	A	H	A	H	A
Result	W	W	D	W	W	D	L	L	D	L	D	L	W	W	L	L	L	L	D	D	D	L	L	W	L	D	D	L	L	L	L	D	W	L	D	D	D	L	L	L	L	L	W	L	L	D
Position	3	4	6	3	1	1	5	8	7	9	10	14	10	9	10	13	16	18	17	18	18	18	19	17	18	16	17	21	22	22	23	23	21	23	22	22	23	23	24	24	24	24	23	23	23	23

Updated to match(es) played on 3 May 2015. Source: Statto.com
A = Away; H = Home; W = Win; D = Draw; L = Loss

=== Matches ===
The fixtures for the 2014–15 season were announced on 18 June 2014 at 9am.

9 August 2014 1	Bury	0–1	Cheltenham Town	Bury
15:00		CTFC Report; BBC Report	Hanks 42'; J. Taylor (yellow card) 85'	Stadium: Gigg Lane; Attendance: 3,376; Referee: Eddie Ilderton

16 August 2014 2	Cheltenham Town	2–1	Accrington Stanley	Cheltenham
15:00	Harrison 34'; Braham-Barrett (yellow card) 38'; Brown (yellow card) 55'; Arthur 84' (yellow card) 85'	CTFC Report; BBC Report	Gray (yellow card) 55'; Naismith 77'	Stadium: Whaddon Road; Attendance: 2,340; Referee: Kevin Johnson

19 August 2014 3	Cheltenham Town	0–0	Carlisle United	Cheltenham
19:45	Arthur (yellow card) 85'	CTFC Report; BBC Report	Brough (yellow card) 38'; O'Hanlon (yellow card) 71'; Dicker (yellow card) 75'; Grainger (yellow card) 90+1'	Stadium: Whaddon Road; Attendance: 2,341; Referee: Darren Deadman

23 August 2014 4	Tranmere Rovers	2–3	Cheltenham Town	Birkenhead
15:00	Richards 12'; Laird 45+1'; Holmes (yellow card) 58'	TRFC Report; CTFC Report; BBC Report	Brown (yellow card) 29'; Richards 67'; Arthur 69'; Wynter 73'; Harrison (yellow card) 58'	Stadium: Prenton Park; Attendance: 4,607; Referee: Nigel Miller

30 August 2014 5	Cheltenham Town	1–0	Hartlepool United	Cheltenham
15:00	Arthur 90'	CTFC Report; HUFC Report; BBC Report	Harewood (yellow card) 59'; Austin (yellow card) 81'; Brobbel (yellow card) 88'	Stadium: Whaddon Road; Attendance: 2,735; Referee: Christopher Sarginson

6 September 2014 6	Morecambe	0–0	Cheltenham Town	Morecambe
15:00	Fleming (yellow card) 81'	CTFC Report; BBC Report	Marquis (yellow card) 80'	Stadium: Globe Arena; Attendance: 2,273; Referee: Mark Haywood

13 September 2014 7	Luton Town	1–0	Cheltenham Town	Luton
15:00	Cullen 8'; Guttridge (yellow card) 44'; Smith (yellow card) 84'	CTFC Report; BBC Report	M. Taylor (yellow card) 18'; Brown (yellow card) 25'; J. Taylor (yellow card) 45'; Marquis (yellow card) 90+4'	Stadium: Kenilworth Road; Attendance: 7,793; Referee: Andy D'Urso

16 September 2014 8	Cheltenham Town	0–1	Southend United	Cheltenham
19:45	J. Taylor (red card) 38'; Braham-Barrett (yellow card) 74'; Marquis (yellow card) 85'	CTFC Report; BBC Report	Clifford 52'; Binnom-Williams (yellow card) 42'; Weston (yellow card) 55'	Stadium: Whaddon Road; Attendance: 2,303; Referee: James Linington

20 September 2014 9	Cheltenham Town	1–1	Dagenham & Redbridge	Cheltenham
15:00	Brown (yellow card) 54'; Hanks 87'	CTFC Report; BBC Report	Labadie (yellow card) 44'; Cureton 58'	Stadium: Whaddon Road; Attendance: 2,597; Referee: Mark Haywood

27 September 2014 10	Burton Albion	1–0	Cheltenham Town	Burton upon Trent
15:00	Beavon 34'; Blyth (yellow card) 83'	CTFC Report; BBC Report	Elliott (yellow card) 8'; Brown (yellow card) 83'	Stadium: Pirelli Stadium; Attendance: 2,225; Referee: David Webb

4 October 2014 11	Cheltenham Town	1–1	AFC Wimbledon	Cheltenham
15:00	M. Taylor 8'	CTFC Report; BBC Report	Barrett 41'	Stadium: Whaddon Road; Attendance: 2,795; Referee: Chris Kavanagh

11 October 2014 12	Shrewsbury Town	3–1	Cheltenham Town	Shrewsbury
15:00	Collins 50'; Mangan 55'; Goldson (yellow card) 58'; Knight-Percival 69'; Wesolowski (yellow card) 78'	CTFC Report; BBC Report	Harrison 48'; Braham-Barrett (yellow card) 55'; Vaughan (yellow card) 60'; M. Taylor (yellow card) 77'	Stadium: New Meadow; Attendance: 4,817; Referee: Seb Stockbridge

18 October 2014 13	Cheltenham Town	3–2	Northampton Town	Cheltenham
15:00	Gornell 45', 78'; Marquis 84'	CTFC Report; BBC Report	Ravenhill (yellow card) 33'; Byrom 48'; Alfei (yellow card) 77'; Moyo 86'	Stadium: Whaddon Road; Attendance: 2,447; Referee: Keith Hill

21 October 2014 14	Cambridge United	1–2	Cheltenham Town	Cambridge
19:45	Appiah 25'	CTFC Report; BBC Report	Richards 10' (yellow card) 53'; Marquis (yellow card) 24'; Brown (yellow card) 30'; Vaughan (yellow card) 38'; Gornell 55'	Stadium: Abbey Stadium; Attendance: 3,252; Referee: Pat Miller

25 October 2014 15	Plymouth Argyle	3–0	Cheltenham Town	Plymouth
15:00	Reid 23'; Hartley 45+1'; Alessandra 76'	CTFC Report; BBC Report	Braham-Barrett (yellow card) 45'; Hanks (yellow card) 87'	Stadium: Home Park; Attendance: 6,837; Referee: Andy Davies

1 November 2014 16	Cheltenham Town	0–1	York City	Cheltenham
15:00	Hanks (yellow card) 10'; Marquis (yellow card) 19'	CTFC Report; BBC Report	De Girolamo 43'	Stadium: Whaddon Road; Attendance: 2,469; Referee: Gavin Ward

15 November 2014 17	Stevenage	5–1	Cheltenham Town	Stevenage
15:00	Beardsley 5', 34'; Lee 8'; Deacon (yellow card) 19'; Barnard 74', 81'	CTFC Report; BBC Report	Harrison 76'	Stadium: Broadhall Way; Attendance: 2,668; Referee: Steve Martin

22 November 2014 18	Cheltenham Town	1–4	Wycombe Wanderers	Cheltenham
15:00	Elliott 3'; Vaughan (red card) 25'	CTFC Report; BBC Report	Cowan-Hall 4'; Craig 37'; Rowe (yellow card) 66'; Jacobson 70'; McClure 90'	Stadium: Whaddon Road; Attendance: 2,833; Referee: Darren Sheldrake

29 November 2014 19	Cheltenham Town	1–1	Oxford United	Cheltenham
15:00	Harrison 52'	CTFC Report; BBC Report	Barnett 61'; Wright (yellow card) 87'	Stadium: Whaddon Road; Attendance: 3,002; Referee: Pat Miller

13 December 2014 20	Mansfield Town	1–1	Cheltenham Town	Mansfield
15:00	Oliver 55'; Waterfall (yellow card) 76'; Tafazolli (yellow card) 90+2'	CTFC Report; BBC Report	M. Taylor (yellow card) 42'; Hanks (yellow card) 84'; Kotwica 87'	Stadium: Field Mill; Attendance: 3,324; Referee: Chris Sarginson

20 December 2014 21	Cheltenham Town	1–1	Portsmouth	Cheltenham
15:00	Sterling-James 42'; Braham-Barrett (yellow card) 90+1'; Vaughan (yellow card) 90+2'	CTFC Report; BBC Report	Atangana 56'	Stadium: Whaddon Road; Attendance: 3,331; Referee: Fred Graham

26 December 2014 22	Exeter City	1–0	Cheltenham Town	Exeter
15:00	Nichols 62'	CTFC Report; BBC Report	Braham-Barrett (yellow card) 44'	Stadium: St James Park; Attendance: 4,591; Referee: Brendan Malone

28 December 2014 23	Cheltenham Town	0–1	Newport County	Cheltenham
15:00		CTFC Report; BBC Report	Zebroski 11'; Sandell (yellow card) 26'; Jackson (yellow card) 38'; Chapman (yellow card) 57'; Jones (yellow card) 65'; Yakubu (yellow card) 84'; Porter (yellow card) 90+3'	Stadium: Whaddon Road; Attendance: 3,417; Referee: Iain Williamson

3 January 2015 24	Oxford United	1–2	Cheltenham Town	Oxford
15:00	Whing (yellow card) 11'; Burns 20'	CTFC Report; BBC Report	Jones (yellow card) 16'; Dunn 40'; Stewart 45+2' (yellow card) 86'	Stadium: Kassam Stadium; Attendance: 5,360; Referee: Michael Bull

10 January 2015 25	Hartlepool United	2–0	Cheltenham Town	Hartlepool
15:00	Fenwick 38'; Bingham 68'; Harrison (yellow card) 90+6'	HUFC Report; CTFC Report; BBC Report	Stewart (yellow card) 37'; Vaughan (yellow card) 55'; Dunn (yellow card) 90+6'	Stadium: Victoria Park; Attendance: 3,155; Referee: Richard Clark

16 January 2015 26	Cheltenham Town	1–1	Morecambe	Cheltenham
19:45	Dunn 18' (pen.); Sterling-James (yellow card) 90'	CTFC Report; BBC Report	Amond 83' (pen.)	Stadium: Whaddon Road; Attendance: 2,122; Referee: Tim Robinson

24 January 2015 27	Cheltenham Town	1–1	Luton Town	Cheltenham
15:00	Kotwica 20' (yellow card) 57'	CTFC Report; BBC Report	Whalley 21'; Lawless (yellow card) 83'; McNulty (yellow card) 86'; Wilkinson (yellow card) 89'	Stadium: Whaddon Road; Attendance: 3,611; Referee: Darren Handley

31 January 2015 28	Dagenham & Redbridge	3–1	Cheltenham Town	Dagenham
15:00	Widdowson (yellow card) 41'; Cureton 55'; Cousins (yellow card) 61'; Hemmings 71'; Jakubiak 90+4'	CTFC Report; BBC Report	Dunn 62' (pen.)	Stadium: Victoria Road; Attendance: 2,696; Referee: Graham Horwood

7 February 2015 29	Cheltenham Town	1–3	Burton Albion	Cheltenham
15:00	Brown (yellow card) 45+2'; Burns 55'	CTFC Report; BBC Report	Beavon 21'; McGurk 36'; Edwards 49'; Weir (yellow card) 81'	Stadium: Whaddon Road; Attendance: 2,389; Referee: Jeremy Simpson

10 February 2015 30	Southend United	2–0	Cheltenham Town	Southend-on-Sea
19:45	Pigott 9', 34'; Hurst (yellow card) 87'	CTFC Report; BBC Report	Wynter (yellow card) 28'; M. Taylor (yellow card) 34'; Berry (yellow card) 90+1'; Richards (yellow card) 90+5'	Stadium: Roots Hall; Attendance: 5,013; Referee: Carl Berry

14 February 2015 31	Cheltenham Town	1–2	Bury	Cheltenham
15:00	Johnstone 24'; Burns (yellow card) 90+3'; Richards (yellow card) 90+5'	CTFC Report; BBC Report	Mayor 4'; Rose 17' (yellow card) 73'; Riley (yellow card) 82'; Adams (yellow card) 90+5'	Stadium: Whaddon Road; Attendance: 2,375; Referee: Charles Breakspear

20 February 2015 32	Accrington Stanley	1–1	Cheltenham Town	Accrington
19:45	Conneely (yellow card) 33'; McCartan 59'	CTFC Report; BBC Report	Burns 31'; Brown (yellow card) 64'	Stadium: Crown Ground; Attendance: 1,216; Referee: Oliver Langford

28 February 2015 33	Cheltenham Town	2–0	Tranmere Rovers	Cheltenham
15:00	Holmes 9' (o.g.); Brown 61' (yellow card) 64'; Burns (yellow card) 66'	CTFC Report; TRFC Report; BBC Report	Myrie-Williams (yellow card) 20'; Odejayi (yellow card) 29'; Holmes (yellow card) 59'	Stadium: Whaddon Road; Attendance: 3,070; Referee: Michael Bull

3 March 2015 34	Carlisle United	1–0	Cheltenham Town	Carlisle
19:45	Wyke 31'; Rigg (yellow card) 89'	CTFC Report; BBC Report	Sparrow (yellow card) 45'; Mills (yellow card) 59'; Manset (yellow card) 84'; Wynter (yellow card) 85'	Stadium: Brunton Park; Attendance: 3,116; Referee: Craig Pawson

7 March 2015 35	Cheltenham Town	1–1	Mansfield Town	Cheltenham
15:00	Burns 47'; Sparrow (yellow card) 56'	CTFC Report; BBC Report	Kee 68'	Stadium: Whaddon Road; Attendance: 2,597; Referee: Trevor Kettle

13 March 2015 36	Newport County	1–1	Cheltenham Town	Newport, Wales
19:45	Storey 38'; Flynn (yellow card) 90+5'	CTFC Report; BBC Report	Burns 13'; Mills (yellow card) 90+5'	Stadium: Rodney Parade; Attendance: 2,951; Referee: Lee Collins

17 March 2015 37	Portsmouth	2–2	Cheltenham Town	Portsmouth
19:45	Matt Tubbs 17'; Taylor 43'	CTFC Report; BBC Report	Richards 18'; Packwood 22'; Brown (yellow card) 61'	Stadium: Fratton Park; Attendance: 13,558; Referee: Dean Whitestone

21 March 2015 38	Cheltenham Town	1–2	Exeter City	Cheltenham
15:00	Sparrow (yellow card) 27'; Braham-Barrett (yellow card) 32'; Burns (yellow card) 36'; Jordan Moore-Taylor 89' (o.g.)	CTFC Report; BBC Report	Nichols 26'; Cummins 86'	Stadium: Whaddon Road; Attendance: 2,880; Referee: Darren Drysdale

28 March 2015 39	Cheltenham Town	0–3	Plymouth Argyle	Cheltenham
15:00	M. Taylor (yellow card) 48'; Hanks (yellow card) 66'; Vaughan (yellow card) 68'	CTFC Report; BBC Report	Reid 34', 64'; B.Reid (yellow card) 36'; Alessandra (yellow card) 69'; Brunt (yellow card) 83'; Ansah 86'	Stadium: Whaddon Road; Attendance: 3,831; Referee: Keith Hill

3 April 2015 40	York City	1–0	Cheltenham Town	York
15:00	Winfield 73'; Zubar (yellow card) 78'	CTFC Report; BBC Report	Mills (yellow card) 78'	Stadium: Bootham Crescent; Attendance: 4,151; Referee: Kevin Wright

6 April 2015 41	Cheltenham Town	0–1	Stevenage	Cheltenham
19:45	Harrad (yellow card) 77'; Braham-Barrett (yellow card) 79'; Vaughan (yellow card) 82'	CTFC Report; BBC Report	Day (yellow card) 18'; Okimo (yellow card) 26'; Kennedy 78' (pen.)	Stadium: Whaddon Road; Attendance: 2,858; Referee: Richard Clark

11 April 2015 42	Wycombe Wanderers	2–1	Cheltenham Town	High Wycombe
15:00	Jacobson (yellow card) 15'; Pierre 45'; Mawson 56'; Sam Saunders (yellow card) 90'	CTFC Report; BBC Report	Deaman (yellow card) 5'; Berry 54' (yellow card) 74'; McDonald (yellow card) 76'	Stadium: Adams Park; Attendance: 3,907; Referee: Tony Harrington

14 April 2015 43	Cheltenham Town	3–1	Cambridge United	Cheltenham
19:45	Harrad 2' (yellow card) 76'; Haynes 57'; Sparrow 75'	CTFC Report; BBC Report	Bird 33'; Donaldson (yellow card) 90+3'	Stadium: Whaddon Road; Attendance: 2,415; Referee: Gary Sutton

18 April 2015 44	Northampton Town	2–0	Cheltenham Town	Northampton
15:00	Byrom (yellow card) 37'; Diamond (yellow card) 45+2'; Toney 57'; Richards 70'	CTFC Report; BBC Report	Berry (yellow card) 18'	Stadium: Sixfields Stadium; Attendance: 4,579; Referee: Darren Sheldrake

25 April 2015 45	Cheltenham Town	0–1	Shrewsbury Town	Cheltenham
15:00	Harrad (yellow card) 32'	CTFC Report; BBC Report	Liam Lawrence (yellow card) 18'; Akpa Akpro 20'; Goldson (yellow card) 89'	Stadium: Whaddon Road; Attendance: 5,117; Referee: Trevor Kettle

2 May 2015 46	AFC Wimbledon	1–1	Cheltenham Town	Kingston upon Thames
15:00	Smith 44'	CTFC Report; BBC Report	Berry (yellow card) 19' (goal) 25'; Brown (yellow card) 51'; Braham-Barrett (yellow card) 90+3'	Stadium: Kingsmeadow; Attendance: 4,374; Referee: Andy Davies

== FA Cup ==
The draw for the first round of the FA Cup was made on 27 October 2014.

8 November 2014 First round	Cheltenham Town	5–0	Swindon Town (3)	Cheltenham
15:00	Harrison 10', 53', 84'; Gornell 36' (yellow card) 74'; Braham-Barrett (yellow card) 38'; Richards 72'	CTFC Report; BBC Report	Thompson (red card) 21'; Turnbull (yellow card) 70'; Byrne (yellow card) 88'	Stadium: Whaddon Road; Attendance: 3,470; Referee: Carl Boyeson

7 December 2014 Second round	Cheltenham Town	0–1	Dover Athletic (5)	Cheltenham
14:00	Gornell (yellow card) 87'	CTFC Report; BBC Report	Essam 83'	Stadium: Whaddon Road; Attendance: 3,552; Referee: Dean Whitestone

== League Cup ==
12 August 2014 Round One	Brighton & Hove Albion (2)	2–0	Cheltenham Town	Brighton
19:45	Dunk 79'; Mackail-Smith 90'	CTFC Report; BBC Report		Stadium: Falmer Stadium; Attendance: 6,595; Referee: Michael Bull

== Football League Trophy ==
2 September 2014 First round	Cheltenham Town	2–0	Oxford United (4)	Cheltenham
19:45	Marquis 45+2'; Arthur 78'	CTFC Report	Meades (red card) 68'	Stadium: Whaddon Road; Attendance: 1,424; Referee: Brendan Malone

7 October 2014 Second round	Cheltenham Town	1–3	Bristol City (3)	Cheltenham
19:45	Taylor (yellow card) 61'; Gornell 64'; Marquis (yellow card) 90'	CTFC Report	Burns 28'; Smith 56', 84'; Fielding (yellow card) 87'; Wynter (yellow card) 90'	Stadium: Whaddon Road; Attendance: 3,599; Referee: Keith Stroud

== Players ==
=== First team squad ===
Only players participated in official matches are listed.
Players sorted by numbers, players joined during the season sorted by the time they joined the team.
Note: Flags indicate national team as defined under FIFA eligibility rules; some limited exceptions apply. Players may hold more than one non-FIFA nationality.

No.	Pos.	Nation	Player
1	GK	NIR	Trevor Carson
2	DF	ENG	Lee Vaughan
3	DF	ENG	Craig Braham-Barrett
4	DF	ENG	Matt Taylor
5	DF	WAL	Troy Brown
6	DF	ENG	Steve Elliott
8	MF	ENG	Matt Richards
9	FW	ENG	Byron Harrison
10	FW	ENG	Terry Gornell
11	MF	ENG	Andy Haworth
14	MF	ENG	Asa Hall
15	DF	ENG	Jack Deaman
16	MF	ENG	Joe Hanks
17	MF	ENG	Zack Kotwica
18	DF	ENG	Paul Black
19	MF	ENG	Omari Sterling-James
21	FW	ENG	Harry Williams
22	FW	ENG	Bobbie Dale
23	DF	ENG	James Bowen
25	MF	ENG	Jason Taylor
27	FW	ENG	Jamal Lawrence

No.	Pos.	Nation	Player
20	FW	GHA	Koby Arthur (On loan from Birmingham City)
7	MF	ENG	Jordan Wynter (On loan from Bristol City, later signed a contract)
26	FW	ENG	John Marquis (On loan from Millwall)
28	FW	ITA	Raffaele De Vita
29	MF	GBS	Eusébio Bancessi (On loan from Wolverhampton Wanderers)
7	MF	IRL	Kane Ferdinand (On loan from Peterborough United)
26	DF	ENG	Kevin Stewart (On loan from Liverpool)
28	MF	ENG	Jack Dunn (On loan from Liverpool)
29	DF	ENG	Lloyd Jones (On loan from Liverpool)
24	MF	ENG	Jake Gray (On loan from Crystal Palace)
25	DF	ENG	Durrell Berry
9	FW	SCO	Denny Johnstone (On loan from Birmingham City)
18	FW	WAL	Eliot Richards
39	FW	FRA	Mathieu Manset
10	FW	WAL	Wes Burns (On loan from Bristol City)
6	DF	ENG	Pablo Mills (On loan from Bury)
24	MF	ENG	Matt Sparrow (On loan from Scunthorpe United)
29	FW	ENG	Shaun Harrad (On loan from Notts County)
9	FW	ENG	Danny Haynes
26	DF	USA	Will Packwood (On loan from Birmingham City)
28	FW	ENG	Shaq McDonald (On loan from Derby County)

=== Transfers ===
Transfers are listed from the last day of the previous season till the final day of this season

In
Date	Player	Age	Signed from	Ends	Fee
19 May 2014	(England) Lee Vaughan	27	Kidderminster Harriers	1 July 2016	Free
28 May 2014	(England) Asa Hall	27	Shrewsbury Town	1 July 2016	Free
24 June 2014	(England) Paul Black	24	Mansfield Town	1 July 2015	Free
24 June 2014	(England) Andy Haworth	25	Tamworth	1 July 2015	Free
30 June 2014	(Northern Ireland) Trevor Carson	26	Bury	1 July 2016	Free
21 July 2014	(England) Jack Deaman	21	Eastbourne Borough	1 July 2015	Free
21 July 2014	(England) Omari Sterling-James	20	Redditch United	21 January 2015	Free
25 July 2014	(England) Matt Taylor	32	Bradford City	1 July 2016	Free
5 September 2014	(England) Matthew Gould	20	Hawke's Bay United	1 July 2015	Free
24 September 2014	(Italy) Raffaele De Vita	27	Bradford City	24 December 2014	Free
28 January 2015	(England) Durrell Berry	22	Torquay United	1 July 2015	Free
2 February 2015	(Wales) Eliot Richards	23	Tranmere Rovers	1 July 2016	Free
2 February 2015	(England) Jordan Wynter	21	Bristol City	1 July 2016	Free
2 February 2015	(France) Mathieu Manset	25	Walsall	1 July 2015	Free
6 March 2015	(England) Danny Haynes	27	Notts County	6 May 2015	Free

Out
Date	Player	Age	Status	Signed to	Fee
6 May 2014	(Portugal) Sido Jombati	26	Released	Wycombe Wanderers	Free
6 May 2014	(England) Ashley Vincent	28	Released	Shrewsbury Town	Free
6 May 2014	(England) Ed Williams	18	Released		Free
6 May 2014	(England) Sam Deering	23	Released	Whitehawk	Free
7 May 2014	(England) Jamie Cureton	38	Released	Dagenham & Redbridge	Free
13 May 2014	(Wales) Connor Roberts	21	Released	Chester	Free
16 May 2014	(England) Jermaine McGlashan	26	Transfer	Gillingham	Free
28 May 2014	(England) Scott Brown	29	Transfer	Aberdeen	Free
27 December 2014	(Italy) Raffaele De Vita	27	Released	Ross County	Free
7 January 2015	(England) Jason Taylor	27	Released	Northampton Town	Free
9 January 2015	(England) Adam Powell	19	Released		Free
19 January 2015	(England) Paul Black	25	Released	Atlanta Silverbacks	Free
27 January 2015	(England) Byron Harrison	27	Transfer	Chesterfield	Undisclosed
2 February 2015	(England) Terry Gornell	25	Released	Accrington Stanley	Free
3 February 2015	(England) Steve Elliott	36	Released	Bath City	Free

=== Contract extensions ===
Date	Player	Age	Ends
28 May 2014	(England) Harry Williams	18	1 July 2015
28 May 2014	(England) Bobbie Dale	18	1 July 2015
29 May 2014	(England) Joe Hanks	19	1 July 2015
29 May 2014	(England) Adam Powell	18	1 July 2015
1 July 2014	(England) James Bowen	18	1 July 2015
16 December 2014	(England) Omari Sterling-James	21	1 July 2016
19 December 2014	(England) Zack Kotwica	19	1 July 2016
21 December 2014	(England) Joe Hanks	19	1 July 2016
25 December 2014	(England) Bobbie Dale	19	1 July 2016
31 December 2014	(England) Harry Williams	18	1 July 2016
8 January 2015	(England) Jack Deaman	21	1 July 2016
29 January 2015	(England) Jamal Lawrence	18	1 July 2017
?	(England) James Bowen	19	1 July 2016

=== Loans ===
In
Player	Age	Signed from	Date	
Player	Age	Signed from	Started	Ended
(Ghana) Koby Arthur	18	Birmingham City	25 July	14 September
(England) Jordan Wynter	20	Bristol City	21 August	22 September
(England) John Marquis	22	Millwall	28 August	26 November
(Guinea-Bissau) Eusébio Bancessi	19	Wolverhampton Wanderers	9 October	5 November
(Republic of Ireland) Kane Ferdinand	22	Wolverhampton Wanderers	20 November	20 April
(England) Kevin Stewart	21	Liverpool	1 January	2 February
(England) Jack Dunn	20	Liverpool	1 January	2 February
(England) Lloyd Jones	19	Liverpool	1 January	15 February
(England) Jake Gray	19	Crystal Palace	16 January	12 February
(Scotland) Denny Johnstone	20	Birmingham City	2 February	9 March
(England) Wes Burns	20	Bristol City	2 February	
(England) Pablo Mills	30	Bury	26 February	20 April
(England) Matt Sparrow	33	Scunthorpe United	26 February	
(England) Shaun Harrad	30	Notts County	26 February	
(United States) Will Packwood	21	Birmingham City	11 March	
(England) Shaq McDonald	19	Derby County	26 March	20 April

Out
Player	Age	Signed to	Date	
Player	Age	Signed to	Started	Ended
(England) Bobbie Dale	19	Bath City	5 September	13 October
(England) Harry Williams	18	Evesham United	5 September	17 November
(England) Adam Powell	18	Cinderford Town	22 September	20 November
(England) Bobbie Dale	19	Cirencester Town	10 October	10 November
(England) Harry Reynolds	18	Cambridge City	10 October	10 November
(England) Jason Taylor	27	Northampton Town	1 January	7 January
(England) Matthew Gould	21	Bishop's Cleeve	13 January	13 February
(England) Andy Haworth	26	Barrow	23 January	
(England) Bobbie Dale	19	Cinderford Town	5 February	
(England) James Bowen	19	Cinderford Town	5 February	5 March
(England) Jamal Lawrence	18	Bishop's Cleeve	6 March	
(England) Harry Reynolds	18	Bishop's Cleeve	6 March	6 April
(England) Harry Williams	18	Gloucester City	12 March	18 April
(England) James Bowen	18	Gloucester City	12 March	18 April

== Squad statistics ==
Numbers in parentheses denote appearances as substitute.
Players with squad numbers struck through and marked † left the club during the playing season.
Players with names in italics and marked * were on loan from another club for the whole of their season with Cheltenham.
Players listed with no appearances have been in the matchday squad but only as unused substitutes.
Key to positions: GK – Goalkeeper; DF – Defender; MF – Midfielder; FW – Forward

No.	Pos.	Nat.	Name	Apps	Goals	Apps	Goals	Apps	Goals	Apps	Goals	Apps	Goals	Yellow card	Red card
No.	Pos.	Nat.	Name	League		FA Cup		League Cup		FL Trophy		Total		Discipline	
1	GK	NIR	Trevor Carson	46	0	2	0	1	0	2	0	51	0	0	0
2	DF	ENG	Lee Vaughan	31 (1)	0	1	0	1	0	1	0	34 (1)	0	6	1
3	DF	ENG	Craig Braham-Barrett	45	0	2	0	1	0	2	0	50	0	10	0
4	DF	ENG	Matt Taylor	31 (2)	1	1	0	0	0	2	0	34 (2)	1	6	0
5	DF	WAL	Troy Brown	42 (1)	1	2	0	1	0	2	0	47 (1)	1	11	0
~~6~~ †	DF	ENG	Steve Elliott	17	1	1	0	1	0	0	0	19	1	1	0
~~6~~ †	DF	ENG	Pablo Mills *	8	0	0	0	0	0	0	0	8	0	3	0
~~7~~ †; 20	MF	ENG	Jordan Wynter	12 (4)	1	0	0	0	0	0	0	12 (4)	1	2	0
~~7~~ †	MF	IRL	Kane Ferdinand *	15 (1)	0	1	0	0	0	0	0	16 (1)	0	0	0
8	MF	ENG	Matt Richards	44 (1)	2	1 (1)	1	1	0	1 (1)	0	47 (3)	3	2	0
~~9~~ †	FW	ENG	Byron Harrison	17 (6)	4	2	3	1	0	1	0	21 (6)	7	1	0
~~9~~ †	FW	SCO	Denny Johnstone *	4 (1)	1	0	0	0	0	0	0	4 (1)	1	0	0
9	FW	ENG	Danny Haynes	5 (3)	1	0	0	0	0	0	0	5 (3)	1	0	0
~~10~~ †	FW	ENG	Terry Gornell	18 (7)	3	2	1	1	0	0 (2)	1	21 (9)	4	2	0
10	FW	WAL	Wes Burns *	14	4	0	0	0	0	0	0	14	4	3	0
~~11~~ †	MF	ENG	Andy Haworth	0 (5)	0	0	0	0 (1)	0	1 (1)	0	1 (7)	0	1	0
12	GK	ENG	Matthew Gould	0	0	0	0	0	0	0	0	0	0	0	0
14	MF	ENG	Asa Hall	1	0	0	0	0	0	0	0	1	0	0	0
15	DF	ENG	Jack Deaman	13 (5)	0	1	0	1	0	2	0	17 (5)	0	1	0
16	MF	ENG	Joe Hanks	16 (17)	2	0 (1)	0	1	0	2	0	19 (18)	2	4	0
17	MF	ENG	Zack Kotwica	8 (9)	2	0 (2)	0	0	0	0	0	8 (11)	2	1	0
~~18~~ †	DF	ENG	Paul Black	3	0	1	0	0	0	0 (1)	0	4 (1)	0	0	0
18	FW	WAL	Eliot Richards	6 (3)	1	0	0	0	0	0	0	6 (3)	1	2	0
19	MF	ENG	Omari Sterling-James	9 (13)	1	0	0	0 (1)	0	1	0	10 (14)	1	1	0
~~20~~ †	FW	GHA	Koby Arthur *	1 (6)	3	0	0	0	0	1	1	2 (6)	4	2	0
21	MF	ENG	Harry Williams	3 (5)	0	0 (1)	0	0	0	0	0	3 (6)	0	0	0
22	FW	ENG	Bobbie Dale	1 (1)	0	0	0	0	0	0	0	1 (1)	0	0	0
23	DF	ENG	James Bowen	1 (2)	0	0	0	0	0	0	0	1 (2)	0	0	0
~~24~~ †	MF	ENG	Jake Gray *	3 (1)	0	0	0	0	0	0	0	3 (1)	0	0	0
24	MF	ENG	Matt Sparrow *	11	1	0	0	0	0	0	0	11	1	3	0
~~25~~ †	MF	ENG	Jason Taylor	16	0	2	0	1	0	2	0	21	0	4	1
25	DF	ENG	Durrell Berry	8 (4)	2	0	0	0	0	0	0	8 (4)	2	4	0
~~26~~ †	FW	ENG	John Marquis *	8 (5)	1	0 (1)	0	0	0	1 (1)	1	9 (7)	2	6	0
~~26~~ †	MF	ENG	Kevin Stewart *	4	1	0	0	0	0	0	0	4	1	2	0
26	DF	USA	Will Packwood *	5	1	0	0	0	0	0	0	5	1	0	0
27	MF	ENG	Jamal Lawrence	0 (1)	0	0	0	0	0	0	0	0 (1)	0	0	0
~~28~~ †	MF	ITA	Raffaele De Vita *	7 (3)	0	2	0	0	0	1	0	10 (3)	0	0	0
~~28~~ †	FW	ENG	Jack Dunn *	5	3	0	0	0	0	0	0	5	3	1	0
~~28~~ †	FW	ENG	Shaq McDonald *	3 (1)	0	0	0	0	0	0	0	3 (1)	0	1	0
~~29~~ †	MF	GNB	Eusébio Bancessi *	2 (2)	0	0	0	0	0	0	0	2 (2)	0	0	0
~~29~~ †	DF	ENG	Lloyd Jones *	5 (1)	0	0	0	0	0	0	0	5 (1)	0	1	0
29	FW	ENG	Shaun Harrad *	10 (2)	1	0	0	0	0	0	0	10 (2)	1	3	0
30	GK	ENG	Harry Reynolds	0	0	0	0	0	0	0	0	0	0	0	0
33	DF	ENG	Danny Reynolds	0	0	0	0	0	0	0	0	0	0	0	0
39	FW	FRA	Mathieu Manset	8 (4)	0	0	0	0	0	0	0	8 (4)	0	1	0

Players not included in matchday squads
No.	Pos.	Nat.	Name
~~24~~ †	MF	ENG	Adam Powell
34	MF	ENG	Reece Daly
