= Jack Deaman =

English footballer

Personal information
- Full name: Jack Edward Deaman
- Date of birth: 17 May 1993 (age 33)
- Place of birth: Camden, England
- Height: 6 ft 3 in (1.91 m)
- Position: Defender

Youth career
- 2007–2011: Wrexham

Senior career*
Years	Team	Apps	(Gls)
2011–2013	Birmingham City	0	(0)
2013	→ Cheltenham Town (loan)	0	(0)
2013–2014	Eastbourne Borough	21	(4)
2014–2016	Cheltenham Town	18	(0)
2015–2016	→ A.F.C. Telford United (loan)	14	(0)
2016	Basingstoke Town	17	(5)
2016–2017	Gloucester City	29	(1)
2016	→ Salford City (loan)	4	(1)
2017–2018	Hereford	34	(3)
2018	Gloucester City		
- * Club domestic league appearances and goals as of 13:16, 25 July 2018 (UTC)

Jack Edward Deaman (born 17 May 1993) is an English retired footballer.

Deaman began his career as a youngster with Wrexham, before joining Birmingham City in 2011. He spent time on loan at League Two club Cheltenham Town, without appearing for the first team, and moved on to Conference South club Eastbourne Borough after Birmingham released him at the end of the 2012–13 season. After a trial with Cheltenham in July 2014, he rejoined the club on a one-year contract. A defender who can also play in midfield, he made his senior debut in the 2014–15 League Cup. After Cheltenham's relegation in 2015, he spent the first half of the following season on loan to National League North club AFC Telford United before joining Basingstoke Town. He left at the end of the season to sign for National League North club Gloucester City. After a loan spell at Salford City, he spent the 2017–18 season with Hereford of the Southern League before returning to Gloucester City for 2018–19.

== Career ==
Deaman was born in the London Borough of Camden. He played as a youngster for Wrexham, helping them reach the Football Association of Wales Youth Cup Final in 2010. After completing a two-year scholarship in 2011, he was offered a contract by the club but chose not to take it up. Instead, he joined Birmingham City on a one-year contract in August 2011.

With numerous defenders unavailable through illness, injury or ineligibility, Deaman was placed on standby for the fifth-round FA Cup replay at home to Chelsea in March 2012, but played no part in the match. At the end of the season, he was given a six-month contract extension, and was given a first-team squad number for 2012–13. His contract was extended to the end of the season, but he remained unable to force his way into Birmingham's matchday squad, and was made available for loan to gain experience. Ahead of the March 2013 loan transfer deadline, Deaman joined League Two club Cheltenham Town on a youth loan for the remainder of the season. His services as defensive cover were never called upon, and he returned to Birmingham where he was released in June 2013 when his contract expired.

After a trial with Stevenage, an extended trial with Torquay United interrupted by an ankle ligament injury sustained in training, and a rather briefer stay with Cambridge United, Deaman signed for Eastbourne Borough in November 2013. Over the remainder of the season, he regained full fitness and made 21 appearances in the Conference South, playing in a variety of positions – full-back and holding midfielder as well as his more usual centre back – which he felt benefited his all-round game.

Deaman signed a one-year contract with former club Cheltenham Town in July 2014 after a trial. He made his senior debut in the 2014–15 League Cup defeat at Championship club Brighton & Hove Albion on 12 August, playing the whole match having replaced rested captain Matt Taylor in the starting eleven. His second appearance, and home debut, was in the Football League Trophy first round win against Oxford United. Deputising for the suspended Troy Brown, Deaman made his Football League debut on 4 October, playing on the right of a back three against what the local newspaper's match report called "two of League Two's most dangerous front players", AFC Wimbledon's Adebayo Akinfenwa and Matt Tubbs. The match ended 1–1, Deaman was man of the match, and manager Mark Yates described his performance as outstanding. He kept his place in the starting eleven after Brown's return from suspension.

Prior to the 2015–16 campaign he joined National League North club AFC Telford United on a six-month loan deal. After Cheltenham confirmed in December that his contract would not be renewed, Deaman signed for Basingstoke Town until the end of the season.

Deaman moved on to Gloucester City of the National League North for the 2016–17 season, and spent a month on loan at Salford City before returning to his parent club where he became a regular in the side. He chose to leave at the end of the season to join Southern League club Hereford, where his one-year contract was not extended. Hereford's manager said that "for whatever reason it didn't work out for him here last season", and he rejoined Gloucester City, now of the National League South.

== Career statistics ==
As of 25 July 2018

Appearances and goals by club, season and competition
Club	Season	League			FA Cup		League Cup		Other		Total	
Club	Season	Division	Apps	Goals	Apps	Goals	Apps	Goals	Apps	Goals	Apps	Goals
Birmingham City	2012–13	Championship	0	0	0	0	0	0	—		0	0
Cheltenham Town (loan)	2012–13	League Two	0	0	—		—		0	0	0	0
Eastbourne Borough	2013–14	Conference South	21	3	—		—		1 (Note: Appearance in Sussex Senior Cup)	1	22	4
Cheltenham Town	2014–15	League Two	18	0	1	0	1	0	2 (Note: Appearances in Football League Trophy)	0	22	0
Cheltenham Town	2015–16	National League	0	0	—		—		—		0	0
Cheltenham Town	Total		18	0	1	0	1	0	2	0	22	0
AFC Telford United (loan)	2015–16	National League North	14	0	1	0	—		2 (Note: Appearances in FA Trophy)	0	17	0
Basingstoke Town	2015–16	National League South	17	2	—		—		1 (Note: Appearance in Hampshire Senior Cup)	0	18	2
Gloucester City	2016–17	National League North	29	1	1	0	—		2 (Note: One appearance in FA Trophy, one in Gloucestershire Senior Cup)	0	32	1
Salford City (loan)	2016–17	National League North	4	0	—		—		—		4	0
Hereford	2017–18	Southern League Premier										
Gloucester City	2018–19	National League South	0	0	0	0	—		0	0	0	0
Career total			103	6	3	0	1	0	8	1	115	7
