= Bobbie Dale =

English footballer (born 1995)

Personal information
- Full name: Robson Louis Dale
- Date of birth: 25 November 1995 (age 30)
- Place of birth: Worcester, England
- Height: 1.83 m (6 ft 0 in)
- Position: Forward

Youth career
- ?–2013: Cheltenham Town

Senior career*
| Years | Team | Apps | (Gls) |
| 2013–2016 | Cheltenham Town | 3 | (0) |
| 2013 | → Bishop's Cleeve (loan) | | |
| 2013–2014 | → Bishop's Cleeve (loan) | | |
| 2014 | → Bath City (loan) | 4 | (0) |
| 2014 | → Cirencester Town (loan) | | |
| 2015 | → Cinderford Town (loan) | | |
| 2015−2016 | → Farnborough (loan) | 12 | (10) |
| 2016 | → Gloucester City | | |
| 2021–2022 | Worcester City | | |
| 2022–???? | Malvern Town | | |
- * Club domestic league appearances and goals

Robson Louis Dale is an English professional footballer who plays as a forward for Worcester City FC

== Playing career ==
Dale came through the youth system at Cheltenham Town. In February 2013 he was loaned out to Southern League side Bishop's Cleeve alongside teammate Zack Kotwica. He made his League Two debut for Cheltenham Town on 17 August 2013, coming on for Byron Harrison 82 minutes into a 3–1 defeat to at Whaddon Road. In August 2013 he joined Bishop's Cleeve once again for a second loan spell. At the end of the season Dale signed one-year contract with Cheltenham Town.

On 5 September 2014 Dale was loaned to Conference South side Bath City on a 1-month deal. He played four times before joining Cirencester Town on another 1-month loan deal. 25 December he extended his contract till the summer 2016. 5 February Dale was loaned to Cinderford Town, initially on 1-month, later deal was prolonged to the end of the season.

Prior to the 2015/16 campaign Dale along with another Cheltenham Town youngster Harry Williams joined Isthmian League Premier Division club Farnborough on loan until January. On 4 February Dale joined National League North side Gloucester City on loan until the end of the season.

He was released by Cheltenham in summer 2016.

He signed for Worcester City in summer 2021, and extended his contract with the club in summer 2022, despite spending much of the 2021–22 season injured. He joined Malvern Town in October 2022.

== Statistics ==
As of match played 23 February 2016

Appearances and goals by club, season and competition (Note: Lower league loan spells appearances are not included)
| Club | Season | League | | | FA Cup | | League Cup | | Other (Note: Other competitive appearances, including the Football League Trophy and FA Trophy) | | Total | |
| Club | Season | Division | Apps | Goals | Apps | Goals | Apps | Goals | Apps | Goals | Apps | Goals |
|---|---|---|---|---|---|---|---|---|---|---|---|---|
| Cheltenham Town | 2013–14 | League Two | 1 | 0 | 0 | 0 | 0 | 0 | 0 | 0 | 1 | 0 |
| Cheltenham Town | 2014–15 | League Two | 2 | 0 | 0 | 0 | 0 | 0 | 0 | 0 | 2 | 0 |
| Cheltenham Town | 2015–16 | National League | 0 | 0 | 0 | 0 | — | | 0 | 0 | 0 | 0 |
| Cheltenham Town | Total | | 3 | 0 | 0 | 0 | 0 | 0 | 0 | 0 | 3 | 0 |
| Bath City (loan) | 2014–15 | Conference South | 4 | 0 | 0 | 0 | — | | 0 | 0 | 4 | 0 |
| Gloucester City (loan) | 2015–16 | Conference North | 1 | 0 | 0 | 0 | — | | 0 | 0 | 1 | 0 |
| Career total | | | 8 | 0 | 0 | 0 | 0 | 0 | 0 | 0 | 8 | 0 |
