= Joe Hanks (footballer) =

English footballer

Personal information
- Full name: Joseph Peter Hanks
- Date of birth: 2 March 1995 (age 31)
- Place of birth: Gloucester, England
- Position: Midfielder

Team information
- Current team: Gloucester City
- Number: 13

Youth career
- ?–2012: Cheltenham Town

Senior career*
Years	Team	Apps	(Gls)
2012–2016	Cheltenham Town	37	(2)
2013	→ Bishop's Cleeve (loan)	10	(7)
2014	→ Gloucester City (loan)	6	(0)
2015–2016	→ Gloucester City (loan)	37	(0)
2016–2020	Gloucester City	146	(25)
2020–2023	Chippenham Town	89	(8)
2023–	Gloucester City	59	(22)
- * Club domestic league appearances and goals as of 22:04, 25 November 2024 (UTC)

Joseph Peter Hanks (born 2 March 1995) is an English footballer who plays as a midfielder for Gloucester City.

== Career ==
Hanks was still a youth team player when he was promoted to the first team for pre-season training in 2012. He made his professional debut on 27 October 2012, in a 3–0 win over Exeter City in the Football League Two, coming on as a substitute for Sam Deering.

In August 2013, he joined Southern League side Bishop's Cleeve on loan.

On 14 March 2014, Hanks joined Conference North side Gloucester City on a one-month loan deal.

On the first day of the 2014–15 season, he came on as a substitute and scored his first senior goal, and the winner as his club beat Bury.

On 20 September 2014 Hanks came off the bench to score his second professional goal, an 87th-minute equaliser in a 1–1 draw against Dagenham & Redbridge. Over the course of the season, Hanks has established himself as a key part of midfield as Cheltenham Town relegated to the National League.

Hanks made a substitute appearance against Lincoln City on the first day of the 2015–16 season. Then, he was loaned out to the National League North neighbours Gloucester City till January. On 9 December it was announced that his contract will not be renewed at the end of the season.

He has since signed for Gloucester City.

He signed for Chippenham Town in May 2020. On 5 November 2022, Hanks scored the only goal as Chippenham defeated EFL League One side Lincoln City to reach the FA Cup second round for the first time in the club's history.

== Career statistics ==
As of match played 2 December 2017

Appearances and goals by club, season and competition (Note: Lower league loan spells are not included)
Club	Season	League			FA Cup		League Cup		Other		Total	
Club	Season	Division	Apps	Goals	Apps	Goals	Apps	Goals	Apps	Goals	Apps	Goals
Cheltenham Town	2012–13	League Two	1	0	0	0	0	0	0	0	1	0
Cheltenham Town	2013–14	League Two	2	0	0	0	0	0	0	0	2	0
Cheltenham Town	2014–15	League Two	33	2	1	0	1	0	2 (Note: Appearances in the Football League Trophy)	0	37	2
Cheltenham Town	2015–16	National League	1	0	—		—		0	0	1	0
Cheltenham Town	Total		37	2	1	0	1	0	2	0	41	2
Gloucester City (loans)	2013–14	Conference North	6	0	0	0	—		0	0	6	0
Gloucester City (loans)	2015–16	National League North	37	0	1	0	—		0	0	38	0
Gloucester City (loans)	Total		43	0	1	0	0	0	0	0	44	0
Gloucester City	2016–17	National League North	42	8	0	0	—		0	0	42	8
Gloucester City	2017–18	National League South	14	1	0	0	—		0	0	14	1
Gloucester City	Total		56	9	0	0	0	0	0	0	56	9
Career totals			136	11	2	0	1	0	2	0	141	11
