= Matt Richards (footballer, born 1984) =

English footballer

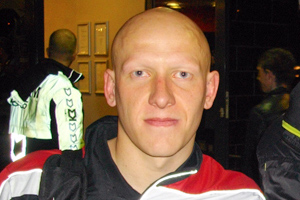
- Richards pictured in 2011

Personal information
- Full name: Matthew Lee Richards
- Date of birth: 26 December 1984 (age 41)
- Place of birth: Harlow, England
- Height: 5 ft 8 in (1.73 m)
- Positions: Midfielder; left back

Youth career
- 2000–2002: Ipswich Town

Senior career*
Years	Team	Apps	(Gls)
2002–2009	Ipswich Town	148	(8)
2007	→ Brighton & Hove Albion (loan)	14	(0)
2008	→ Brighton & Hove Albion (loan)	14	(0)
2008–2009	→ Brighton & Hove Albion (loan)	23	(1)
2009–2011	Walsall	86	(12)
2011–2013	Shrewsbury Town	85	(12)
2013–2015	Cheltenham Town	91	(8)
2015–2016	Dagenham & Redbridge	10	(0)
2017–2019	Bath City	24	(3)
2019	Banbury United	7	(0)
Total		502	(44)

International career
2004–2005	England U16	5	(0)
2005–2006	England U17	5	(0)
2006	England U18	1	(0)
2004	England U21	1	(0)
- * Club domestic league appearances and goals

Matthew Lee Richards (born 26 December 1984) is an English former professional footballer who played as a midfielder or left back.

== Career ==
=== Ipswich Town ===
Matt is a graduate of the Ipswich Town academy, and made his debut in the UEFA Cup against Avenir Beggen aged just 17. He received his only England under-21 cap for appearing in the England U21 victory over Ukraine U21 in August 2004. He played a prominent role in Joe Royle's Play-off semi-finalist making teams in 2003/04 and 2004/05. When Club Captain Jim Magilton was made manager in 2006–07, Richards found himself out of favour. Originally regarded as a left-back, he is now much more comfortable as a midfielder, either playing on the left or in the centre.

==== Brighton & Hove Albion (loans) ====
On 18 September 2007, Richards joined League One side Brighton & Hove Albion on a provisional one-month loan deal, although the Seagulls had allegedly been tracking the player all through the summer of 2007.

Richards' loan deal at Brighton was extended by a further two months, running up until 18 December 2007. He played 14 League games in total during his three-month loan at the Withdean and ex-Brighton manager Dean Wilkins expressed his interest on loaning the player until the end of the 2007/08 season. On 17 January 2008, it was revealed that Richards had agreed to join Brighton on loan for the remainder of the 2007–08 season.

Richards once again rejoined Brighton on loan until the end of December 2008 on 21 July 2008. He scored his first goal for Brighton in a 4-0 Football League Cup win over Barnet on 12 August 2008. In the following round he scored the winning penalty as Brighton knocked out Premier League side Manchester City in a shootout.

==== Return to Ipswich ====
Richards made his Ipswich return in 2009 under new manager Roy Keane starting against Cardiff in a 3–0 win at Ninian Park. This would turn out to be his last game for the club as he was released on 14 May 2009.

=== Walsall ===
Richards had a trial spell with Burton Albion scoring in a friendly against Ilkeston Town, however following a successful trial at League One side Walsall, Richards penned a two-year contract with the Saddlers. Richards stated his desire to sign on at Walsall on Twitter, however, this was not possible.

=== Shrewsbury Town ===
Richards impressed during a trial period with Shrewsbury Town and underwent a medical at the Greenhous Meadow on 27 July 2011, with the deal expected to be completed in the following days. He signed a two-year deal with the Shropshire outfit on 28 July 2011, and scored his first goal in Shrewsbury colours on 8 October in a 3–2 home win over Barnet. The season finished with Shrewsbury earning promotion to League One with Richards playing in excess of 30 games and earning players, and fans player of the year awards.

Richards was released by Shrewsbury at the end of the 2012–13 season and joined Cheltenham Town on 5 July 2013.

=== Cheltenham Town ===
Richard joined League Two side Cheltenham Town on 5 July 2013. He scored his first goal for Cheltenham in a 3–1 defeat to Plymouth Argyle on 17 August 2013.

=== Dagenham & Redbridge ===
In August 2015, he signed for League Two side Dagenham & Redbridge on a one-year deal after impressing whilst on trial during pre-season. In May 2016 as his contract expired, he was released along with eleven players as Dagenham were relegated to the National League.

=== Later years ===
In November 2017, after a year out of the game, Richards joined Bath City of the National League South. On 23 March 2019, he joined Banbury United in the Southern Football League Premier Division. He left the club in late May, at the end of the season.

== Career statistics ==
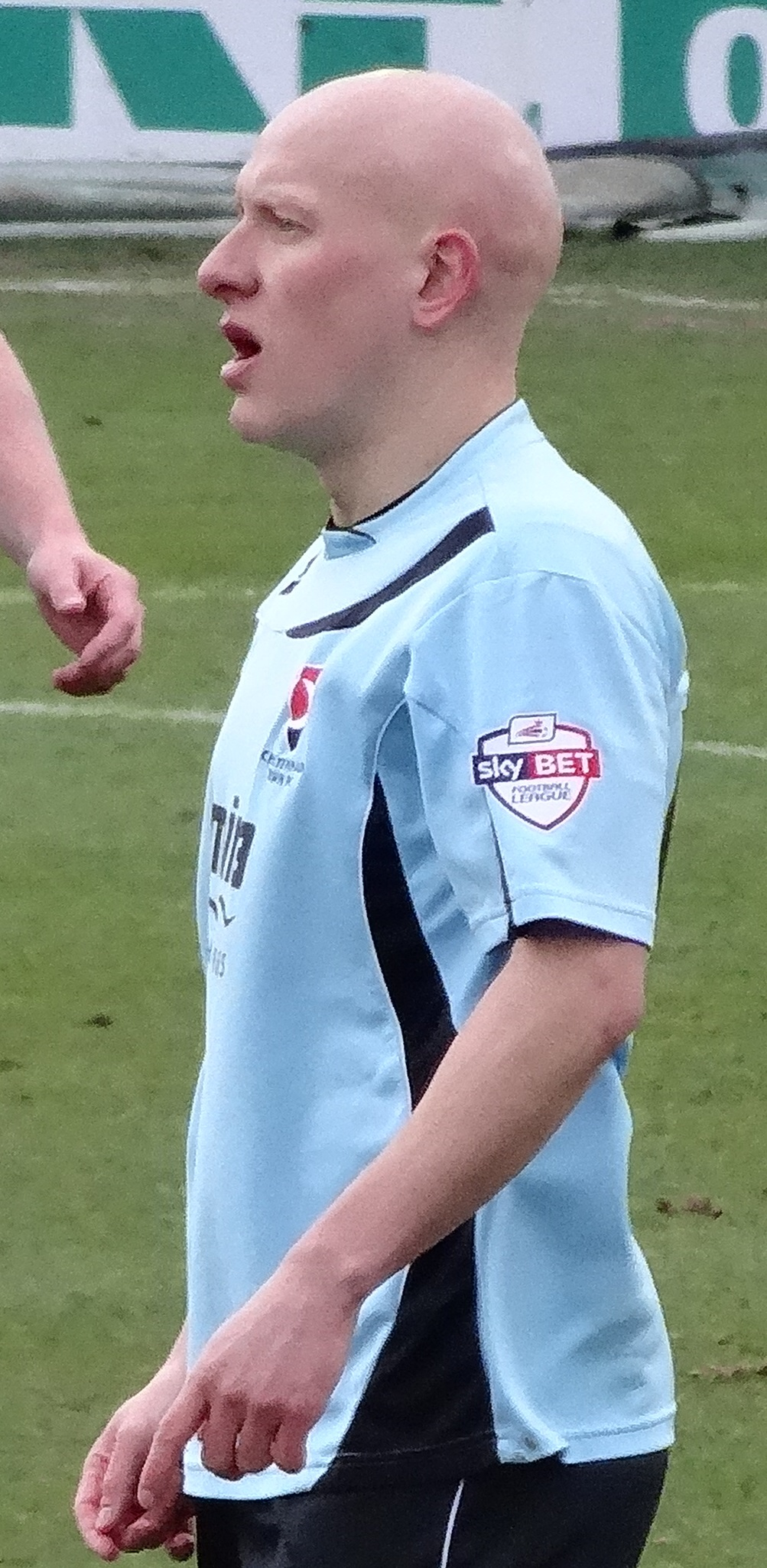
Richards playing for Cheltenham Town in 2014

As of match played 27 January 2018

Appearances and goals by club, season and competition
Club	Season	League			FA Cup		League Cup		Other		Total	
Club	Season	Division	Apps	Goals	Apps	Goals	Apps	Goals	Apps	Goals	Apps	Goals
Ipswich Town	2002–03	First Division	13	0	1	0	1	0	2 (Note: Appearances in UEFA Cup)	0	17	0
Ipswich Town	2003–04	First Division	44	1	2	0	2	0	2 (Note: Appearances in First Division play-offs)	0	50	1
Ipswich Town	2004–05	Championship	24	1	1	0	1	0	2 (Note: Appearances in Championship play-offs)	0	28	1
Ipswich Town	2005–06	Championship	38	4	1	0	1	0	—		40	4
Ipswich Town	2006–07	Championship	28	2	3	1	1	0	—		32	3
Ipswich Town	2008–09	Championship	1	0	0	0	0	0	—		1	0
Ipswich Town	Total		148	8	8	1	6	0	6	0	168	9
Brighton & Hove Albion (loan)	2007–08	League One	28	0	3	0	0	0	2 (Note: Appearance(s) in Football League Trophy)	0	33	0
Brighton & Hove Albion (loan)	2008–09	League One	23	1	2	0	3	1	4	0	32	2
Brighton & Hove Albion (loan)	Total		51	1	5	0	3	1	6	0	65	2
Walsall	2009–10	League One	40	4	2	0	1	0	1	0	44	4
Walsall	2010–11	League One	46	8	3	1	1	0	1	0	51	9
Walsall	Total		86	12	5	1	2	0	2	0	95	13
Shrewsbury Town	2011–12	League Two	42	5	3	0	2	0	1	0	48	5
Shrewsbury Town	2012–13	League One	43	7	0	0	1	0	1	0	45	7
Shrewsbury Town	Total		85	12	3	0	3	0	2	0	93	12
Cheltenham Town	2013–14	League Two	46	6	1	0	2	2	0	0	49	8
Cheltenham Town	2014–15	League Two	45	2	2	1	1	0	2	0	50	3
Cheltenham Town	Total		91	8	3	1	3	2	2	0	99	11
Dagenham & Redbridge	2015–16	League Two	10	0	0	0	0	0	1	0	11	0
Bath City	2017–18	National League South	19	3	0	0	—		6 (Note: Appearance(s) in FA Trophy)	0	25	3
Bath City	2018–19	National League South	5	0	0	0	—		1	0	6	0
Bath City	Total		24	3	0	0	0	0	7	0	31	3
Career total			495	44	24	3	17	3	26	0	562	50

== Honours ==
Shrewsbury Town

- Football League Two: 2011–12

Individual

- Shrewsbury Town Player of the Year: 2011–12
- Shrewsbury Town Players' Player of the Year: 2011–12
