= Terry Gornell =

English footballer (born 1989)

Personal information
- Full name: Terence Michael Gornell
- Date of birth: 16 December 1989 (age 36)
- Place of birth: Liverpool, England
- Height: 5 ft 11 in (1.80 m)
- Position: Striker

Youth career
- –2008: Tranmere Rovers

Senior career*
Years	Team	Apps	(Gls)
2008–2010	Tranmere Rovers	40	(3)
2008	→ Accrington Stanley (loan)	11	(4)
2010–2011	Accrington Stanley	40	(13)
2011–2013	Shrewsbury Town	53	(9)
2012–2013	→ Rochdale (loan)	8	(5)
2013	Rochdale	11	(0)
2013–2015	Cheltenham Town	59	(5)
2015–2017	Accrington Stanley	54	(9)
2017	Chorley	5	(0)
- * Club domestic league appearances and goals as of 04:16, 30 October 2020 (UTC)

Terence Michael Gornell (born 16 December 1989) is an English former footballer who played as a striker.

== Club career ==
=== Tranmere Rovers ===
Born in Liverpool, Gornell joined Tranmere Rovers at a young age and after coming through the club's academy, Gornell signed his first professional contract with the club in May 2008. This came after Gornell appeared on the first team bench as an un-used substitute in numbers of occasions in the 2007–08 season. While at the club's academy, Gornell considered Wayne Allison as his mentor.

Ahead of the new 2008–09 season, Gornell was given number fourteen shirt for the side. He made his début for Tranmere Rovers, coming on as a substitute in the 82nd minute, away to Grimsby Town, in the 2–0 defeat in the League Cup on 12 August 2008. Upon his return to Tranmere Rovers, Gornell's first league appearance for the club was at Accrington Stanley came on 25 November 2008, making his first start for the club, in a 2–0 win over Scunthorpe United. The next three months saw him away from the starting line–up, being placed on the substitute bench or not in the squad. On 21 February 2009 he scored his first Tranmere Rovers goal, against Milton Keynes Dons. Despite being further sidelined, Gornell ended up making ten appearances for the club. At the end of the 2008–09 season, he signed a two-year contract with Tranmere Rovers.

At the start of the 2009–10 season, Gornell scored his first goal of the season and then set one of the fourth goal, in a 4–2 win over Gillingham on 15 August 2009. However, he then spent two months on the sidelines, due to being on the substitute bench and competitions. On 12 October 2009 Gornell returned to the first team, starting a match and played 66 minutes before being substituted, in a 1–0 loss against Stockport County. Since returning to the first team, he continued to remain involved in a number of matches for the side. On 23 November 2009 Gornell scored his second goal of the season, in a 2–0 win against Southend United on 23 November 2009. He then scored again, in a 2–1 win over Aldershot Town in the second round of FA Cup replay on 8 December 2009. He then received a straight red card after stamping Billy Paynter, which saw Tranmere Rovers lose 3–0 to Swindon Town and turning out to be his last appearance of the season At the end of the 2009–10 season, Gornell went on to make twenty-seven appearances and scoring twice this season.

In the 2010–11 season, Gornell featured for three matches at the start of the season, but his first team opportunities was soon limited following the arrivals of Adam McGurk, Lucas Akins and Sam Morrow.

=== Accrington Stanley ===
Gornell went on loan to Accrington Stanley on a one-month deal on 20 September 2008. The same day, he made his Accrington Stanley debut, coming on as a substitute for Jamie Clarke in the 46th minute, in a 3–0 loss against Darlington. Gornell then scored three goals in three games between 11 October 2008 and 21 October 2008 against Bradford City, Luton Town and Shrewsbury Town. His time at the club saw him became a first team regular, scoring four goals in 11 Football League games before returning to his parent club. He stated his loan spell at Accrington Stanley helped him and described "dealing with the pressures of first-team football" as "a big learning experience".

On 27 August 2010, Gornell signed on a free transfer for Accrington Stanley on his return with a two-year contract. He made his club return the next day, in a 0–0 draw against Oxford United. Since joining Accrington Stanley, Gornell became a first team regular for the side, playing in the striker position. On 17 September 2010, he scored his first goals, in a 3–0 win over Lincoln City After the match, Gornell credited Manager John Coleman for helping him end "his goalscoring duck". He then scored two consecutive goals in two separate matches by the end of his first half of the season. Gornell then added three more goals throughout January, including scoring two goals in two matches. Gornell went to add four more goals by the end of the season, including another brace, in a 4–0 win over Hereford United on 29 March 2011. Despite missing three matches during the club's 2010–11 campaign, he scored a total of 13 goals from defence in 49 appearances as Accrington's joint top goalscorer for the season alongside Phil Edwards and Sean McConville.

Following this, Gornell was offered a new contract, but turned down an offer from Accrington Stanley, although the club would be owed a compensation payment given he was under 23. Gornell was linked with a move to Inverness CT, who initially signed him, only to retract the move.

=== Shrewsbury Town ===
On 4 July 2011, Gornell was named as a Shrewsbury Town player after agreeing terms with the club; however, negotiations remain ongoing with the fee that Accrington will receive from Shrewsbury for the striker. He agreed terms with and transferred to Shrewsbury Town on 5 July 2011.

Gornell made his debut in the opening game of the season, coming on as a substitute for Marvin Morgan in the 89th minute, in a 1–1 draw against Plymouth Argyle. This was followed up by scoring his first goal as a Shrewsbury Town player in a 1–1 draw with Burton Albion. Two weeks later on 27 August 2011, he scored his second goal for the club, in a 2–1 win against Swindon Town. However, during a 3–1 win against Hereford United on 10 September 2011, Gornell received a straight red card in the 62nd minute. After serving a three match suspension, he returned to the first team, coming on as an 80th-minute substitute, in a 2–0 win against Torquay United on 24 September 2011. After adding two more goals to his Shrewsbury Town's career, Gornell then scored in the first round of the FA Cup, in a 1–0 win against Newport County. On 28 January 2012 e scored his fifth goal of the season, in a 2–0 win against Hereford United. His performance attracted interests from Preston North End and Rochdale. Despite this, Gornell later scored four more goals, including a brace against Rotherham United on 14 April 2012. His involvement in the first team and contributions has helped the club gain promotion to League One. He scored nine more goals in forty-one league appearances in his first season at Shrewsbury Town.

However, Gornell's second season turned out to be unsuccessful with injury and lack of forms under manager Graham Turner despite his aim to score more goals to fill in for following the departure of James Collins. By the time he left Shrewsbury Town, Gornell made thirteen appearances in all competitions. Following his move to Rochdale, Manager Turner explained his decision to loan him out, citing his goal-scoring form, which was the main factor by making it improvement.

=== Rochdale ===
On 9 November 2012, Gornell signed for Rochdale on a one-month loan deal. He made his debut the following day, in a 2–1 win against Wycombe Wanderers. Two weeks later on 23 November 2012, Gornell scored his first goal, in a 3–1 loss against Southend United. On 7 December 2012, Gornell had his loan spell with the club extended until 5 January 2013. Later in the day facing against Exeter City, he scored a brace, but was received a straight red card at the last minutes, as Rochdale lost 3–2. After serving a three match suspension, Gornell scored a brace on his return, in a 4–2 win over Bradford City on 29 December 2012.

On 10 January 2013, Gornell signed for Rochdale permanently until the end of the season. However, Gornell failed to score since he turned his move to Rochdale permanently, due to his own injury concern. At the end of the 2012–2013 season, Gornell made nineteen appearances and scoring five times in all competitions. Following this, he was among eight players to be released by the club.

=== Cheltenham Town ===
On 12 July 2013, Gornell signed for League Two side Cheltenham Town on a two-year contract.

He made his debut for the club in the opening game of the season, in a 2–2 draw against Burton Albion. Three days later on 6 August 2013, Gornell scored his first goal for Cheltenham Town, in a 4–3 win against Crawley Town in the first round of the League Cup. Since joining the club, he became a first team regular for the side, playing in the striker position. Gornell then scored two goals in two games between 14 September 2013 and 21 September 2013 against Oxford United and Torquay United. He scored his third goal of the season, in a 3–0 win over Morecambe on 22 October 2013. However, Gornell scored only four goals in thirty-eight appearances in all competition.

In his second season at the club, Gornell continued to remain involve in the first team, playing in the striker position. He scored his first goal of the season on 8 October 2014, in the second round of Football League Trophy, in a 3–1 loss against Bristol City. It took until 29 October 2014 to confirm that Gornell's goal was officially credited after it was originally listed as an own goal but following an appeal to the Dubious Goals Panel. Ten days later on 18 October 2014, he scored a brace, in a 3–2 win against Northampton Town. This was followed up by scoring his fourth goal of the season, in a 2–1 win against Cambridge United three days later. With six months left to his contract, Gornell left the club by mutual consent following the arrival of Paul Buckle. He previously was placed on the transfer list at his request just two months prior to his departure. By the time Gornell left the Cheltenham Town, he made thirty appearances and scoring five times in all competitions.

=== Return to Accrington Stanley ===
Following his release by Cheltenham Town, Gornell joined Accrington Stanley for the third time on an eighteen-month contract.

Gornell re-debut for the third time five days later, in a 1–0 loss against Plymouth Argyle. This was followed up by scoring in the next matches against Oxford United and Southend United. Since re-joining the club, he became a first team regular for the side, playing in the striker position. However, Gornell was sent–off for a straight red card in the 41st minute, in a 1–1 draw against Morecambe on 3 April 2015. After serving a three match suspension, he returned to the first team, coming on as a 76th-minute substitute, in a 2–2 draw against Stevenage on 18 April 2015. In the last game of the season, Gornell scored his fourth goal of the season, in a 2–1 win against Mansfield Town. At the end of the 2014–15 season, he went on to make fifteen appearances and scoring four times in all competitions.

In the opening game of the 2015–16 season, Gornell captained Accrington Stanley for the first time in his career, starting the whole game, in a 1–1 draw against Luton Town. Three days later on 11 August 2015, he scored his first goal of the season against Hull City in the first round of the League Cup, as the club lost 4–3 in the penalty shootout following a 2–2 draw throughout 120 minutes. Gornell found himself, alternating between a starting and a substitute role throughout the 2015–16 season. He also captained Accrington Stanley for most of the season. On 4 January 2016 Gornell scored his second goal of the season, in a 3–2 win against Mansfield Town. However, he suffered ankle injury that saw him sidelined for a month. Despite this, Gornell went on to score two more goals later in the 2015–16 season. However, he then played in both legs of the League Two play–offs against AFC Wimbledon, as the club lost 3–2 on aggregate. At the end of the season, Gornell went on to make twenty–five appearances and scoring four times in all competitions. Following this, he signed a one–year contract extension after being offered a new contract by Accrington Stanley.

At the start of the 2016–17 season, however, Gornell suffered an injury in the 15th minute against Barnet on 13 August 2016 and was substituted, as the club lost 2–0. As a result, he missed three matches as a result. On 3 September 2016 Gornell returned to the first team, coming on as a 75th-minute substitute, in a 1–1 draw against Carlisle United. Between 27 September 2016 and 8 October 2016, he scored four times, including a brace against Chesterfield in the EFL Trophy match. Later in the 2016–17 season, Gornell found his playing time reduced and found himself placed on the substitute bench. At the end of the 2016–17 season, he went on to make twenty–four appearances and scoring four times in all competitions.

Following this, Gornell remained under contract for the 2017–18 season. However, on 28 June 2017, he announced his contract termination with Accrington Stanley by mutual consent.

=== Chorley ===
It was announced on 30 June 2017 that Chorley signed Gornell on a one–year contract.

He made his debut for the club in the opening game of the season against Kidderminster Harriers, as Chorley won 1–0. Gornell went on to make five appearances for the club before being leaving Chorley on 28 August 2017 by mutual consent, due to wanting to invest time into his company.

Gornell is currently a maths teacher at Wirral Grammar School for Boys.

== Career statistics ==
As of match played 19 August 2017.

Club statistics
Club	Season	League			FA Cup		League Cup		Other		Total	
Club	Season	Division	Apps	Goals	Apps	Goals	Apps	Goals	Apps	Goals	Apps	Goals
Tranmere Rovers	2008–09	League One	10	1	2	0	1	0	0	0	13	1
Tranmere Rovers	2009–10	League One	27	2	3	1	2	0	0	0	32	3
Tranmere Rovers	2010–11	League One	3	0	—		2	0	—		5	0
Tranmere Rovers	Total		40	3	5	1	5	0	0	0	50	4
Accrington Stanley (loan)	2008–09	League Two	11	4	—		—		—		11	4
Accrington Stanley	2010–11	League Two	40	13	2	0	—		2 (Note: Appearances in Football League Trophy)	0	44	13
Accrington Stanley	Total		51	17	2	0	—		2	0	55	17
Shrewsbury Town	2011–12	League Two	41	9	3	1	2	0	1	0	47	10
Shrewsbury Town	2012–13	League One	12	0	0	0	1	0	0	0	13	0
Shrewsbury Town	Total		53	9	3	1	3	0	1	0	60	10
Rochdale (loan)	2012–13	League Two	8	5	—		—		—		8	5
Rochdale	2012–13	League Two	11	0	—		—		—		11	0
Rochdale	Total		19	5	—		—		—		19	5
Cheltenham Town	2013–14	League Two	34	3	1	0	2	1	1	0	38	4
Cheltenham Town	2014–15	League Two	25	3	2	1	1	0	2	1	30	5
Cheltenham Town	Total		59	6	3	1	3	1	3	1	68	9
Accrington Stanley	2014–15	League Two	15	4	—		—		—		15	4
Accrington Stanley	2015–16	League Two	20	3	2	0	1	1	2 (Note: Appearances in Football League Two play-offs)	0	25	4
Accrington Stanley	2016–17	League Two	19	2	3	0	1	0	1 (Note: Appearance in EFL Trophy)	2	24	4
Accrington Stanley	Total		56	9	5	0	2	1	3	2	64	12
Chorley	2017–18	National League North	5	0	—		—		—		5	0
Career total			283	49	18	3	13	2	9	3	321	57
