= Craig Braham-Barrett =

English footballer

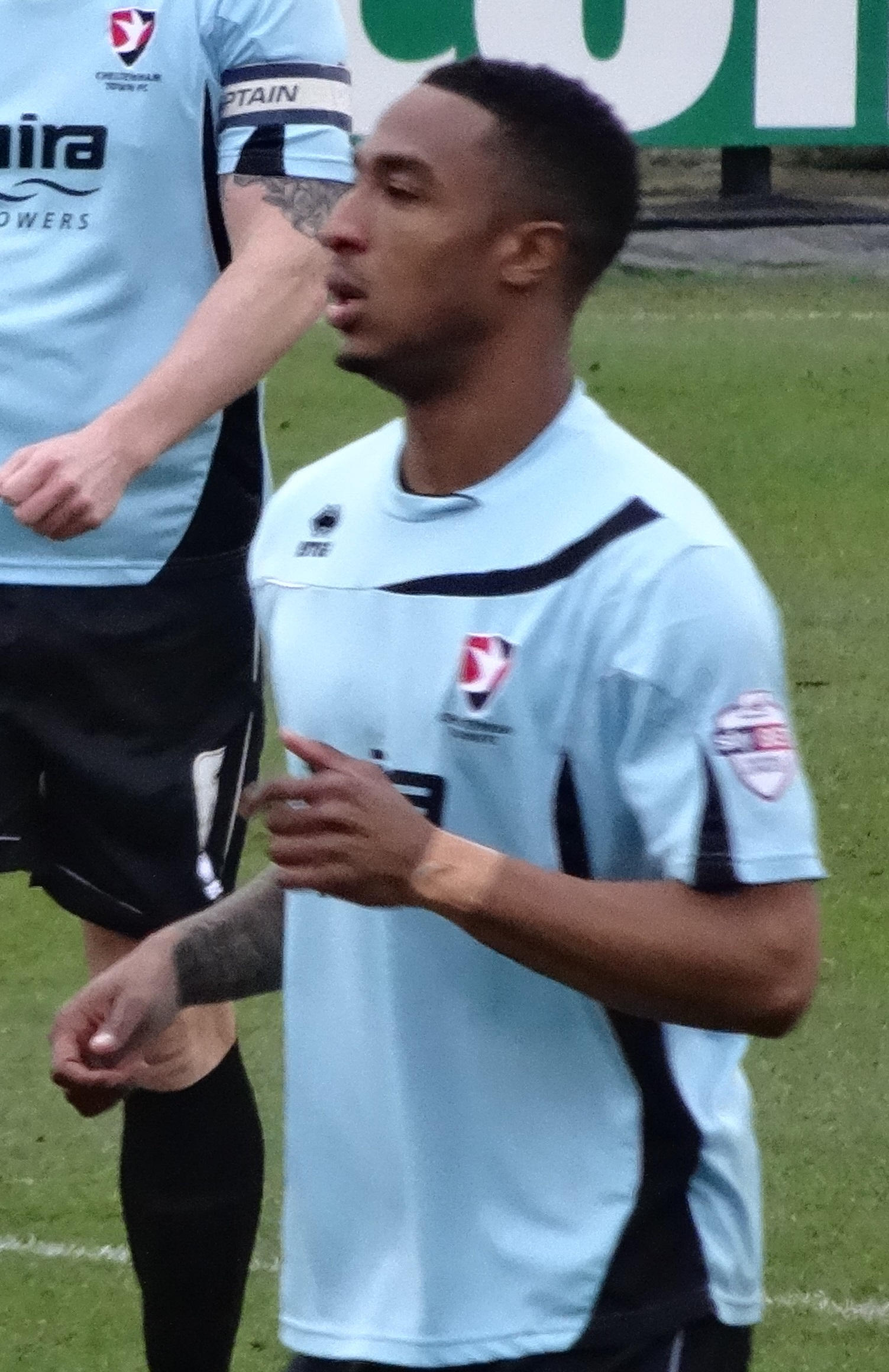
- Braham-Barrett with Cheltenham Town in 2014

Personal information
- Full name: Craig Michael Braham-Barrett
- Date of birth: 28 June 1988 (age 38)
- Place of birth: Greenwich, England
- Height: 1.75 m (5 ft 9 in)
- Position: Defender

Team information
- Current team: AFC Whyteleafe

Youth career
- Dulwich Hamlet
- 2000–2005: Charlton Athletic
- 2005–2006: Sheffield Wednesday

Senior career*
Years	Team	Apps	(Gls)
2006–2007	Aveley		
2007	Dulwich Hamlet	4	(0)
2007	Potters Bar Town	5	(0)
2007	Eastleigh		
2007–2008	East Thurrock United		
2008	Welling United	11	(1)
2008–2009	Peterborough United	0	(0)
2009	→ Kettering Town (loan)	2	(0)
2009	Grays Athletic	12	(0)
2009–2011	Farnborough	54	(1)
2011–2012	Havant & Waterlooville	23	(2)
2012	Sutton United	11	(0)
2012–2013	Macclesfield Town	40	(0)
2013	→ Cheltenham Town (loan)	3	(0)
2013–2015	Cheltenham Town	71	(0)
2015	Ebbsfleet United	0	(0)
2015	→ Woking (loan)	4	(0)
2015	→ Whitehawk (loan)	5	(0)
2016	→ Whitehawk (loan)	2	(0)
2016	Dover Athletic	11	(0)
2016–2017	Braintree Town	15	(1)
2016	→ Welling United (loan)	5	(0)
2017–2018	Chelmsford City	39	(0)
2018–2019	Welling United	35	(1)
2019–2020	Hemel Hempstead Town	20	(0)
2020–2021	Dartford	20	(0)
2021–2023	Tonbridge Angels	70	(0)
2023–2024	Dulwich Hamlet	27	(1)
2024–	AFC Whyteleafe	60	(0)

International career^{‡}
2018–2024	Montserrat	29	(0)
- * Club domestic league appearances and goals as of 19:57, 26 April 2026 (UTC) ‡ National team caps and goals as of 16:56, 10 September 2024 (UTC)

Craig Michael Braham-Barrett (born 28 June 1988) is a professional footballer. Born in England, he represents the Montserrat national football team. He plays for AFC Whyteleafe.

== Career ==
Braham-Barrett began his career with Dulwich Hamlet, before moving to Charlton Athletic, being released in 2007. He played non-league football with Eastleigh, East Thurrock United and Welling United before joining Peterborough United in October 2008 for a fee of £10,000. He failed to make an impression at London Road and re-entered non-league football with Grays Athletic, Farnborough Town, Havant & Waterlooville, Sutton United before joining Conference Premier side Macclesfield Town in July 2012. After a season at Macclesfield he joined Cheltenham Town on loan in July 2013. He made his Football League debut in a 2–2 draw with Burton Albion on 3 August 2013. He made his transfer permanent on 20 August 2013.

Following Cheltenham's relegation from the football league in 2015, Braham-Barrett joined Ebbsfleet United. He was loaned to Woking, then had two further loan spells at Whitehawk before signing permanently for Dover Athletic in March 2016. On 14 October of the same year Braham-Barrett re-joined Welling United from Braintree Town on a one-month loan.

On 14 June 2017, Braham-Barrett joined National League South side Chelmsford City. The following May he returned to Welling for his third spell at the club. In the summer of 2019, he signed for National League South side Hemel Hempstead Town. In January 2020 he joined Dartford.

On 18 June 2021, Braham-Barrett joined Tonbridge Angels ahead of the 2021–22 season.

On 3 May 2023, it was confirmed that Braham-Barrett had left Tonbridge Angels after two seasons at the club. On 4 June 2023 it was announced that Braham-Barrett signed with Dulwich Hamlet. Braham-Barrett joined AFC Whyteleafe in October 2024.

== International career ==
Braham-Barrett is eligible to play for Jamaica and also for Montserrat, who he qualifies for through his grandmother. In March 2015, he was called up to the 2018 FIFA World Cup qualifier against Curaçao for Montserrat, however, he declined the call to focus on his club football with Cheltenham.

In August 2018, Braham-Barrett accepted a call-up for Montserrat. On 8 September 2018, Braham-Barrett played the full 90 minutes in a 2–1 loss against El Salvador.

== Career statistics ==
As of match played 9 December 2023.

Appearances and goals by club, season and competition
Club	Season	League			FA Cup		League Cup		Other		Total	
Club	Season	Division	Apps	Goals	Apps	Goals	Apps	Goals	Apps	Goals	Apps	Goals
Peterborough United	2008–09	League Two	0	0	0	0	0	0	0	0	0	0
Kettering Town (loan)	2008–09	Conference Premier	2	0	0	0	—		0	0	2	0
Grays Athletic	2009–10	Conference Premier	12	0	0	0	—		0	0	12	0
Farnborough	2009–10	Southern League Premier Division	19	1	0	0	—		1 (Note: One appearance in the Southern League Cup)	0	20	1
Farnborough	2010–11	Conference South	35	0	1	0	—		4 (Note: One appearance in the FA Trophy, three in the Conference South Play-Offs)	0	40	0
Farnborough	Total		54	1	1	0	—		5	0	60	1
Havant & Waterlooville	2011–12	Conference South	23	2	2	1	—		1 (Note: One appearance in the FA Trophy)	0	26	3
Sutton United	2011–12	Conference South	11	0	0	0	—		1 (Note: One appearance in the Conference South Play-offs)	0	12	0
Macclesfield Town	2012–13	Conference Premier	40	0	6	0	—		1 (Note: One appearance in the FA Trophy)	0	47	0
Cheltenham Town (loan)	2013–14	League Two	3	0	0	0	1	0	0	0	4	0
Cheltenham Town	2013–14	League Two	26	0	1	0	1	0	0	0	28	0
Cheltenham Town	2014–15	League Two	45	0	2	0	1	0	2 (Note: Two appearances in the Football League Trophy)	0	50	0
Cheltenham Town	Total		71	0	3	0	2	0	2	0	78	0
Ebbsfleet United	2015–16	National League South	0	0	0	0	—		0	0	0	0
Woking (loan)	2015–16	National League	4	0	0	0	—		0	0	4	0
Whitehawk (loan)	2015–16	National League South	7	0	2	0	—		1 (Note: One appearance in the FA Trophy)	0	10	0
Dover Athletic	2015–16	National League	11	0	0	0	—		0	0	11	0
Braintree Town	2016–17	National League	15	1	0	0	—		0	0	15	1
Welling United (loan)	2016–17	National League South	5	0	0	0	—		1 (Note: One appearance in the FA Trophy)	0	6	0
Chelmsford City	2017–18	National League South	39	0	4	0	—		1 (Note: One appearance in the FA Trophy)	0	44	0
Welling United	2018–19	National League South	35	1	1	0	—		0	0	36	1
Hemel Hempstead Town	2019–20	National League South	20	0	0	0	—		1 (Note: One appearance in the FA Trophy)	0	21	0
Dartford	2019–20	National League South	7	0	0	0	—		6 (Note: Three appearances in the National League South Play-Offs, three appearances in the Kent Senior Cup)	0	13	0
Dartford	2020–21	National League South	13	0	1	0	—		2 (Note: Two appearances in the FA Trophy)	0	16	0
Dartford	Total		20	0	1	0	0	0	8	0	29	0
Tonbridge Angels	2021–22	National League South	32	0	0	0	—		4 (Note: Four appearances in the FA Trophy)	0	36	0
Tonbridge Angels	2022–23	National League South	38	0	0	0	—		4 (Note: Four appearances in the FA Trophy)	0	42	0
Tonbridge Angels	Total		70	0	0	0	0	0	8	0	78	0
Dulwich Hamlet	2023–24	Isthmian League Premier Division	8	1	1	0	—		2 (Note: One appearance in the FA Trophy) (Note: One appearance in the Velocity Cup)	0	11	1
Career total			440	6	21	1	3	0	32	0	496	7

== Honours ==
Welling United

- London Senior Cup (1): 2018–19
