= Jordan Wynter =

English footballer (born 1993)

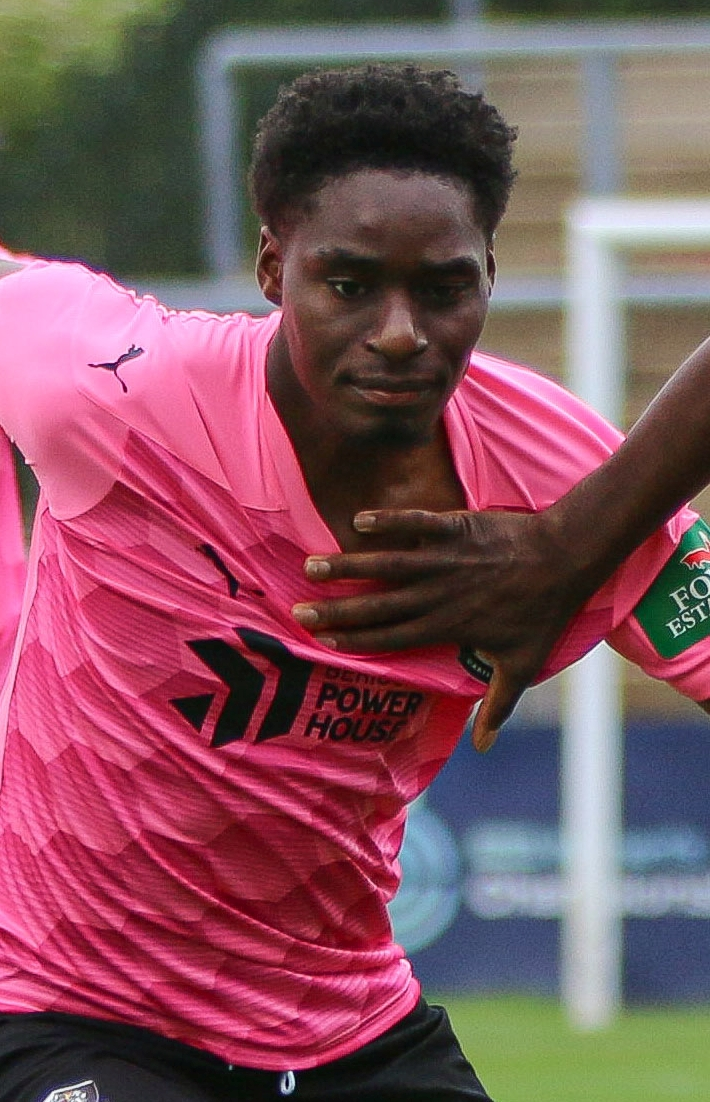
- Wynter playing for Dartford in August 2021.

Personal information
- Full name: Jordan James Cecil Wynter
- Date of birth: 24 November 1993 (age 32)
- Place of birth: Redbridge, England
- Height: 1.86 m (6 ft 1 in)
- Positions: Right-back; midfielder

Team information
- Current team: Dulwich Hamlet

Youth career
- 2002–2013: Arsenal

Senior career*
Years	Team	Apps	(Gls)
2013–2015	Bristol City	3	(0)
2014	→ Cheltenham Town (loan)	6	(1)
2015–2016	Cheltenham Town	10	(0)
2015	→ Farnborough (loan)	1	(0)
2015–2016	→ AFC Telford United (loan)	3	(0)
2016	→ AFC Telford United (loan)	14	(0)
2016	Barton Rovers	10	(1)
2016–2017	Bromley	12	(1)
2017–2018	Woking	25	(0)
2018–2019	Maidstone United	8	(0)
2018–2019	→ Dartford (loan)	28	(1)
2019–2024	Dartford	137	(1)
2024–	Dulwich Hamlet	22	(0)
- * Club domestic league appearances and goals as of 17:10, 15 February 2025 (UTC)

Jordan James Cecil Wynter (born 24 November 1993) is an English footballer who plays as a defender or midfielder. He currently plays for Dulwich Hamlet.

== Club career ==
=== Early career ===
Wynter joined Arsenal youth ranks in 2002 from local side Redbridge United, aged 8, and signed a professional deal in 2012. He made seven appearances for the under-21 side in 2012–13 season, and was awarded number 63 jersey for the first-team squad. On 22 May 2013, Wynter joined Bristol City, in a two-year deal. On 3 August, he made his professional debut, in a 2–2 home draw against Bradford City. He scored his first goal for the club 3 days later, in a 2–0 win against Gillingham in the League Cup.

=== Cheltenham Town ===
On 22 August 2014, Wynter joined League Two side Cheltenham Town on a one-month loan deal from Bristol City. A day later, Wynter scored on his Cheltenham debut during their 3–2 away victory against Tranmere Rovers. Wynter went onto appear five more times for Cheltenham before returning to Bristol City at the end of the month.

On 2 February 2015, Wynter returned Cheltenham Town to on an eighteen-month deal after leaving Bristol City on a free transfer. Five days later, Wynter made his Cheltenham return in their 3–1 home defeat against Burton Albion, featuring for the entire 90 minutes.

On 7 September 2015, Wynter joined Isthmian League Premier Division side Farnborough on a one-month loan deal. On the same day, Wynter made his Farnborough debut in their 3–2 home defeat against Staines Town, featuring for 63 minutes before being replaced by Nathan Chambers. Wynter made a total of five appearances for Farnborough before returning to Cheltenham after suffering an injury.

In December 2015, he joined AFC Telford United on a loan deal from Cheltenham Town. On 12 December 2015, Wynter made his Telford debut in their FA Trophy first round tie against Chester, which resulted in a 2–0 defeat for the Bucks. On 29 January 2016, Wynter's loan spell at Telford was extended until the end of the campaign.

=== Barton Rovers ===
In July 2016, preceding his release from Cheltenham, Wynter joined Southern League Division One Central side Barton Rovers. On the opening day of the 2016–17 campaign, Wynter made his Barton Rovers debut in their 2–1 home defeat against Fleet Town. On 27 September 2016, Wynter scored his first and only goal for Barton Rovers in their 6–3 away victory against Royston Town. Wynter made eleven appearances, scoring once for Barton Rovers in total before leaving the club in late 2016.

=== Bromley ===
In December 2016, Wynter joined National League side Bromley on a non-contract basis. On 17 December 2016, Wynter made his Bromley debut in their 2–1 victory against Macclesfield Town, coming off the bench in the 92nd minute to replace George Porter. After almost a month at the club, Wynter was finally rewarded with his first start in Bromley's 5–1 home defeat against Forest Green Rovers, featuring for the entire 90 minutes. Following this heavy defeat, Wynter failed to feature again until February. On 11 March 2017, Wynter went onto score his first goal for Bromley in their 3–0 home victory over North Ferriby United, coming on in the 92nd minute and scoring within seconds of featuring.

Although Wynter was invited back to pre-season training for Bromley's forthcoming season, he instead decided to leave the club.

=== Woking ===
On 30 June 2017, Wynter joined fellow National League side Woking on a one-year deal. On 12 August 2017, Wynter made his Woking debut during their 3–0 away defeat against Barrow, featuring for 63 minutes before being replaced by Chez Isaac. Following an injury to Richard Orlu, Wynter replaced the skipper and formed a partnership with Josh Staunton, in which Woking only lost once in the space of a month. Following a prolonged injury, Wynter returned to the Woking side after a three-month lay-off, replacing Joey Jones during the Cards' 3–0 away defeat against Leyton Orient.

=== Maidstone United ===
On 24 May 2018, following Woking's relegation to the National League South, Wynter opted to join Maidstone United on a one-year deal. On 28 September Wynter joined Dartford on an initial month's loan.

=== Dartford ===
On 15 May 2019, Wynter joined Dartford on a permanent basis.

On 11 May 2024, it was announced that Wynter would leave Dartford after six years at the club.

=== Dulwich Hamlet ===
On 17 May 2024, Wynter joined Dulwich Hamlet on a permanent basis.

== Personal life ==
Wynter is of Jamaican descent.

== Career statistics ==
As of match played 15 February 2025.

Club	Season	League			FA Cup		League Cup		Other		Total	
Club	Season	Division	Apps	Goals	Apps	Goals	Apps	Goals	Apps	Goals	Apps	Goals
Bristol City	2013–14	League One	3	0	1	0	1	1	1 (Note: One appearance in the Football League Trophy)	0	6	1
Bristol City	2014–15	League One	0	0	0	0	1	0	1 (Note: One appearance in the Football League Trophy)	0	2	0
Bristol City	Bristol City total		3	0	1	0	2	1	2	0	8	1
Cheltenham Town (loan)	2014–15	League Two	6	1	0	0	0	0	0	0	6	1
Cheltenham Town	2014–15	League Two	10	0	0	0	0	0	0	0	10	0
Farnborough (loan)	2015–16	Isthmian League Premier Division	1	0	2	0	—		0	0	3	0
AFC Telford United (loan)	2015–16	National League North	17	0	0	0	—		1 (Note: One appearance in the FA Trophy)	0	18	0
Barton Rovers	2016–17	Southern League Division One Central	10	1	0	0	—		1 (Note: One appearance in the FA Vase)	0	11	1
Bromley	2016–17	National League	12	1	0	0	—		2 (Note: Two appearances in the FA Trophy)	0	14	1
Woking	2017–18	National League	25	0	6	0	—		1 (Note: One appearance in the FA Trophy)	0	32	0
Maidstone United	2018–19	National League	8	0	0	0	—		0	0	8	0
Dartford (loan)	2018–19	National League South	28	1	1	0	—		3 (Note: Two appearances in the FA Trophy) (Note: One appearance in the Kent Senior Cup)	0	32	1
Dartford	2019–20	National League South	18	0	1	0	—		5 (Note: Two appearances in the Kent Senior Cup) (Note: Three appearances in the National League South Play-Offs)	1	24	1
Dartford	2020–21	National League South	13	0	0	0	—		2 (Note: Two appearances in the FA Trophy)	0	15	0
Dartford	2021–22	National League South	27	0	3	0	—		4 (Note: Three appearances in the FA Trophy) (Note: One appearance in the Kent Senior Cup)	0	34	0
Dartford	2022–23	National League South	39	0	1	0	—		2 (Note: One appearance in the FA Trophy) (Note: One appearance in the National League South Play-Offs)	0	42	0
Dartford	2023–24	National League South	40	1	1	0	—		3 (Note: Two appearances in the London Senior Cup) (Note: One appearance in the FA Trophy)	0	44	1
Dartford	Dartford total		165	2	7	0	0	0	19	1	191	3
Dulwich Hamlet	2024–25	Isthmian League Premier Division	22	0	0	0	—		3 (Note: Two appearances in the FA Trophy) (Note: One appearance in the London Senior Cup)	0	25	0
Career total			279	5	16	0	2	1	28	1	325	7
