= James Bowen (footballer) =

English footballer (born 1996)

Personal information
- Full name: James Bowen
- Date of birth: 4 February 1996 (age 30)
- Place of birth: Birmingham, England
- Height: 1.81 m (5 ft 11 in)
- Position: Left back

Team information
- Current team: Coleshill Town
- Number: 8

Youth career
- –2013: Cheltenham Town

Senior career*
Years	Team	Apps	(Gls)
2013–2017	Cheltenham Town	10	(0)
2013	→ Bishop's Cleeve (loan)		
2014	→ Evesham United (loan)	6	(2)
2015–2016	→ Gloucester City (loan)	15	(2)
2016	→ Hereford (loan)	15	(0)
2016	→ Stafford Rangers (loan)	33	(0)
2017	Hereford	0	(0)
2017	Solihull Moors	10	(0)
2018	Hereford	0	(0)
2018–2019	Leamington	17	(0)
2019	Redditch United	0	(0)
2019–2021	Halesowen Town	6	(0)
2021–2023	Boldmere St. Michaels	72	(4)
2023	Redditch United		
2023–2024	Sutton Coldfield Town	3	(0)
2024–	Coleshill Town	8	(0)
- * Club domestic league appearances and goals as of 10 November 2025

James Bowen (born 4 February 1996) is an English footballer who played for Northern Premier League Division One Midlands side Coleshill Town, where he played as a left back, he can also be deployed as a winger. He most recently joined Leamington based side Minds Matter United due to being a keen advocate for men's mental health.

== Playing career ==
Bowen began his career with Cheltenham Town, progressing through the club's youth setup. In the 2013 summer he was loaned to Bishop's Cleeve, appearing regularly during his spell.

On 28 March 2014 Bowen was loaned to Evesham United in a work experience deal. He made his debut for the club on 2 April, scoring a brace and providing an assist in a 4–0 home win against North Leigh.

On 1 July 2014 Bowen signed his first professional deal. On 15 November he made his professional debut, starting in a 1–5 away loss against Stevenage.

Prior to the 2015/16 campaign he joined Conference North club Gloucester City on loan until January. On 9 December 2015 it was announced that his contract will not be renewed at the end of the season. On 22 February Bowen joined Midland Football League side Hereford on an initial one-month loan deal.

After leaving Hereford he signed for Stafford Rangers, spending a season there before rejoining Hereford again for the start of the 2017–18 campaign.

On 23 February 2019, Bowen left National League North side Leamington, and joined Southern League Premier Central side Redditch United.

== Statistics ==
As of match played 23 February 2016

Appearances and goals by club, season and competition (Note: Lower league loan spells appearances are not included)
Club	Season	League			FA Cup		League Cup		Other (Note: Other competitive appearances, including the Football League Trophy and FA Trophy)		Total	
Club	Season	Division	Apps	Goals	Apps	Goals	Apps	Goals	Apps	Goals	Apps	Goals
Cheltenham Town	2014–15	League Two	3	0	0	0	0	0	0	0	0	0
Cheltenham Town	2015–16	National League	1	0	—		—		0	0	0	0
Cheltenham Town	Total		4	0	0	0	0	0	0	0	4	0
Gloucester City (loan)	2015–16	National League North	15	2	1	0	—		0	0	16	2
Career total			19	2	1	0	0	0	0	0	20	2
