= Matthew Gould (footballer) =

New Zealand association football player

Personal information
- Full name: Matthew Richard Gould
- Date of birth: 7 January 1994 (age 32)
- Place of birth: Warwick, England
- Height: 1.89 m (6 ft 2 in)
- Position: Goalkeeper

Team information
- Current team: Yeovil Town
- Number: 22

Senior career*
Years	Team	Apps	(Gls)
2011–2014	Hawke's Bay United	4	(0)
2014–2015	Cheltenham Town		
2015	→ Bishop's Cleeve (loan)		
2015–2016	Livingston	0	(0)
2015–2016	→ Stenhousemuir (loan)	6	(0)
2016	→ Stourbridge (loan)		
2016–2018	Stourbridge	138	(0)
2018–2020	Spennymoor Town	87	(0)
2020–2024	Altrincham	20	(0)
2021–2022	→ Nantwich Town (loan)		
2022	→ Chorley (loan)	1	(0)
2024–	Yeovil Town	1	(0)
- * Club domestic league appearances and goals as of 16:30, 25 April 2026 (UTC)

Matthew Richard Gould (born 7 January 1994) is a professional footballer who plays as a goalkeeper for National League club Yeovil Town where he is also goalkeeping coach. Born in England, he has been called up to the New Zealand national team.

== Club career ==
In September 2014, after four appearances for Hawke's Bay United in the New Zealand Football Championship, Gould signed for Cheltenham Town in EFL League Two. After a loan spell at Bishop's Cleeve, Gould signed for Livingston in 2015 but did not make an appearance for the first team. In 2016 after loan spells at Stenhousemuir and Stourbridge, Gould signed on to stay with Stourbridge playing in the Northern Premier League Premier Division. Gould help the club make the third round of the FA Cup after beating Northampton Town, who at the time were four divisions higher than Stourbridge, 1–0. They would lose to Wycombe Wanderers 2–1 in the next round. After playing in 138 games for the club, Gould left in 2018. On 16 August 2020, Gould signed with Altrincham. In 2021, after not appearing for Altrincham, Gould was loaned out to Nantwich Town for three months. On the 23 May 2022, Gould signed an extension with Altrincham where he would not only try to compete for the starting spot, but hold a dual role as the first-teams keeper coach after completing his UEFA qualifications.

In July 2024, Gould joined newly promoted National League side Yeovil Town in the role of player/goalkeeping coach. He signed a new contract with Yeovil at the end of 2025–26 season, signing a one-year deal to continue his role as player/goalkeeping coach.

== International career ==
In January 2022, he was named in the New Zealand national team senior squad for two matches in Abu Dhabi and Dubai.

== Personal life ==
Gould is the son of former Celtic player and current goalkeeping coach, Jonathan Gould, nephew of Richard Gould and grandson of former Wimbledon manager Bobby Gould.
