= Lee Vaughan =

English footballer (born 1986)

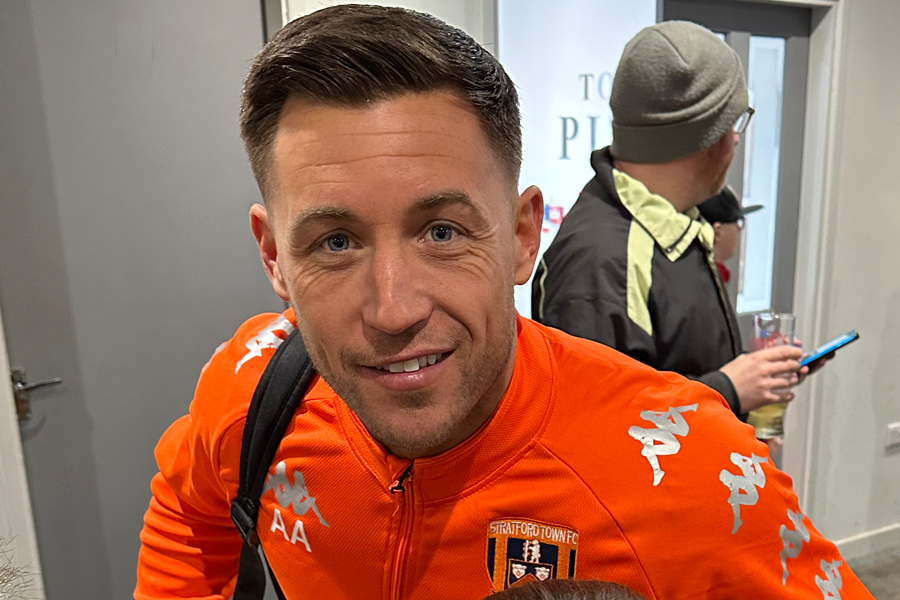
- Vaughan with Stratford Town in April 2023

Personal information
- Full name: Lee David Vaughan
- Date of birth: 17 July 1986 (age 40)
- Place of birth: Birmingham, England
- Position: Defender

Youth career
- Birmingham City
- Portsmouth

Senior career*
Years	Team	Apps	(Gls)
2004–2005	Chelmsley Town	17	(5)
2005–2006	Walsall	0	(0)
2005–2006	→ Willenhall Town (loan)	9	(0)
2006–2010	AFC Telford United	179	(7)
2010–2014	Kidderminster Harriers	157	(7)
2014–2016	Cheltenham Town	32	(0)
2015–2016	→ Tranmere Rovers (loan)	7	(0)
2016–2017	Tranmere Rovers	52	(2)
2017–2019	Kidderminster Harriers	46	(3)
2019–2020	Solihull Moors	35	(0)
2020–2021	AFC Telford United	15	(0)
2021	Barnet	20	(0)
2021–2023	Stourbridge	52	(4)
2023–2024	Stratford Town	13	(0)
Total		634	(28)

International career
2009–2011	England C	2	(0)
- * Club domestic league appearances and goals as of 14:51, 21 November 2024 (UTC)

Lee David Vaughan (born 17 July 1986) is an English retired footballer who played as a defender. He played in the Football League for Cheltenham Town.

== Career ==
A Birmingham City and Portsmouth trainee, Vaughan joined Walsall from Chelmsley Town in February 2005 in a non-contract basis. He had a loan spell at Willenhall Town, and subsequently moved to A.F.C. Telford United in the summer of 2006.

On 11 May 2010 Vaughan joined Kidderminster Harriers. He appeared in 157 league matches for Harriers, and was named in the 2012–13 Conference Team of the Year alongside teammates Josh Gowling and Anthony Malbon, a season when Harriers finished second in the league, before rejecting a new deal in May 2014.

On 19 May 2014 Vaughan signed a two-year deal with Football League Two club Cheltenham Town. He played his first match in the Football League on 9 August, starting in a 1–0 win at Bury. He was a regular in the side for the 2014–15 season, at the end of which Cheltenham were relegated to the National League, but could not keep his place in 2015–16. In November 2015, he joined another National League club, Tranmere Rovers, on loan, and the move was made permanent in January 2016 when Cheltenham cancelled his contract.

Despite missing the end of the 2016–17 National League season because of a broken leg, he was named in the National League Team of the Year. He rejoined Kidderminster Harriers in 2017, and returned to competitive action in December, playing regularly until the end of the National League North season and for the first half of the next. Vaughan then returned to the National League with Solihull Moors.

In June 2020, Vaughan re-joined AFC Telford United. He then joined Barnet in March 2021 on a deal until the end of the season. He made 20 appearances for the Bees before leaving on the expiry of his contract.

Vaughan joined Stourbridge in June 2021. In March 2023, he signed for Stratford Town.

In May 2024, Vaughan announced his retirement from playing.

== Coaching career ==
In October 2023, Vaughan was named player-assistant manager of Stratford Town. He departed the club in August 2024.

In November 2024, Vaughan was appointed assistant manager of Northern Premier League Division One West club Hednesford Town, once again supporting Gavin Hurren. Gavin and Lee took the club from 17th in the league to 2nd and was promoted through the playoffs

== Honours ==
AFC Telford United

- Conference League Cup: 2008–09

Cheltenham Town

- National League: 2015–16

Individual

- Conference Premier Team of the Year: 2012–13
