= Jack Dunn (footballer, born 1994) =

English footballer (born 1994)

Personal information
- Full name: Jack Anthony Dunn
- Date of birth: 19 November 1994 (age 31)
- Place of birth: Liverpool, England
- Height: 1.72 m (5 ft 8 in)
- Positions: Striker; winger; attacking midfielder

Team information
- Current team: Marine

Youth career
- 2010–2015: Liverpool

Senior career*
Years	Team	Apps	(Gls)
2015–2017	Liverpool	0	(0)
2015	→ Cheltenham Town (loan)	5	(3)
2015	→ Burton Albion (loan)	1	(0)
2016	→ Morecambe (loan)	7	(1)
2017	→ Tranmere Rovers (loan)	5	(0)
2017–2018	Tranmere Rovers	9	(0)
2018–2021	Warrington Town	43	(10)
2018	→ Widnes (loan)		
2020	→ Southport (loan)	3	(0)
2021–2022	Curzon Ashton		
2022	→ Marine (loan)	8	(2)
2022–2024	Marine	9	(1)

International career
2011	England U17	6	(0)
2012	England U18	1	(0)
2012	England U19	2	(0)
- * Club domestic league appearances and goals as of 17:17, 26 November 2022 (UTC)

Jack Anthony Dunn (born 19 November 1994) is an English footballer who last played for Marine. He primarily plays as an attacking midfielder or winger.

== Club career ==
=== Early career ===
Dunn was born and raised in Liverpool and has graduated through the ranks of the Liverpool F.C. Reserves and Academy having captained the Under-16's in 2010. In the same year, he made his debut for the Liverpool U18s.

He made his under-21 debut in March 2013 against the reserve team of Wolverhampton Wanderers and marked his debut by scoring. For the 2013–14 U21 season, he was a regular starter and was the team's top scorer with 10 goals from 18 appearances.

He got his first taste of playing for the senior team on 14 May 2014 in a post-season friendly against Shamrock Rovers. He came on in the 79th minute to replace Fabio Borini and then scored three minutes later to wrap up a dominant 4–0 victory.

==== Loan to Cheltenham Town ====
On 1 January, Dunn signed a one-month loan deal with Cheltenham Town along with fellow reserve teammates Kevin Stewart and Lloyd Jones. He made his Cheltenham, and senior debut, on 3 January in a League Two match against Oxford United. He marked his debut by scoring in the 2–1 victory for Cheltenham. At the end of the month he was recalled to Liverpool, after picking-up an injury.

==== Loan to Burton Albion ====
On 26 March 2015, Dunn joined Burton Albion on month-long loan. On 18 April 2015, Dunn made his debut for Burton Albion in a 2–1 win against Morecambe.

==== Loan to Morecambe ====
On 30 July 2016 he joined Morecambe on loan until January 2017. He scored a hat-trick for Morecambe in a 5–4 EFL Cup win against Rotherham United on 9 August 2016. He returned to the club before the end of the loan period.

=== Tranmere Rovers ===
On 9 June 2017, Dunn joined Tranmere Rovers after being released by Liverpool. He was released by Tranmere at the end of the 2017–18 season.

=== Warrington Town ===
Dunn completed a move to Warrington Town of the Northern Premier League in July 2018. Two months later, he was loaned out to fellow NPL club Widnes. He netted on his Widnes debut, scoring a winner during a victory away to Skelmersdale United on 7 October.

Dunn returned in mid November 2018 to Warrington Town from his loan spell at Widnes and became an integral member of the squad, playing most games.

On the last day of the winter transfer window he joined Southport on loan.

=== Curzon Ashton ===
Dunn joined Curzon Ashton in June 2021. In March 2022, he moved to Marine on loan where he scored the winning goal in the playoff final which saw Marine promoted to the Northern Premier League Premier Division.

=== Marine ===
After being released by Curzon Ashton in 2022, Dunn signed for Marine on a one-year contract in June 2022.

== International career ==
Dunn has represented England at Under-17, Under-18 and Under-19 level. He last featured for England U19s in a friendly against Switzerland on 30 May 2012.
