= Troy Brown (footballer) =

English footballer (born 1990)

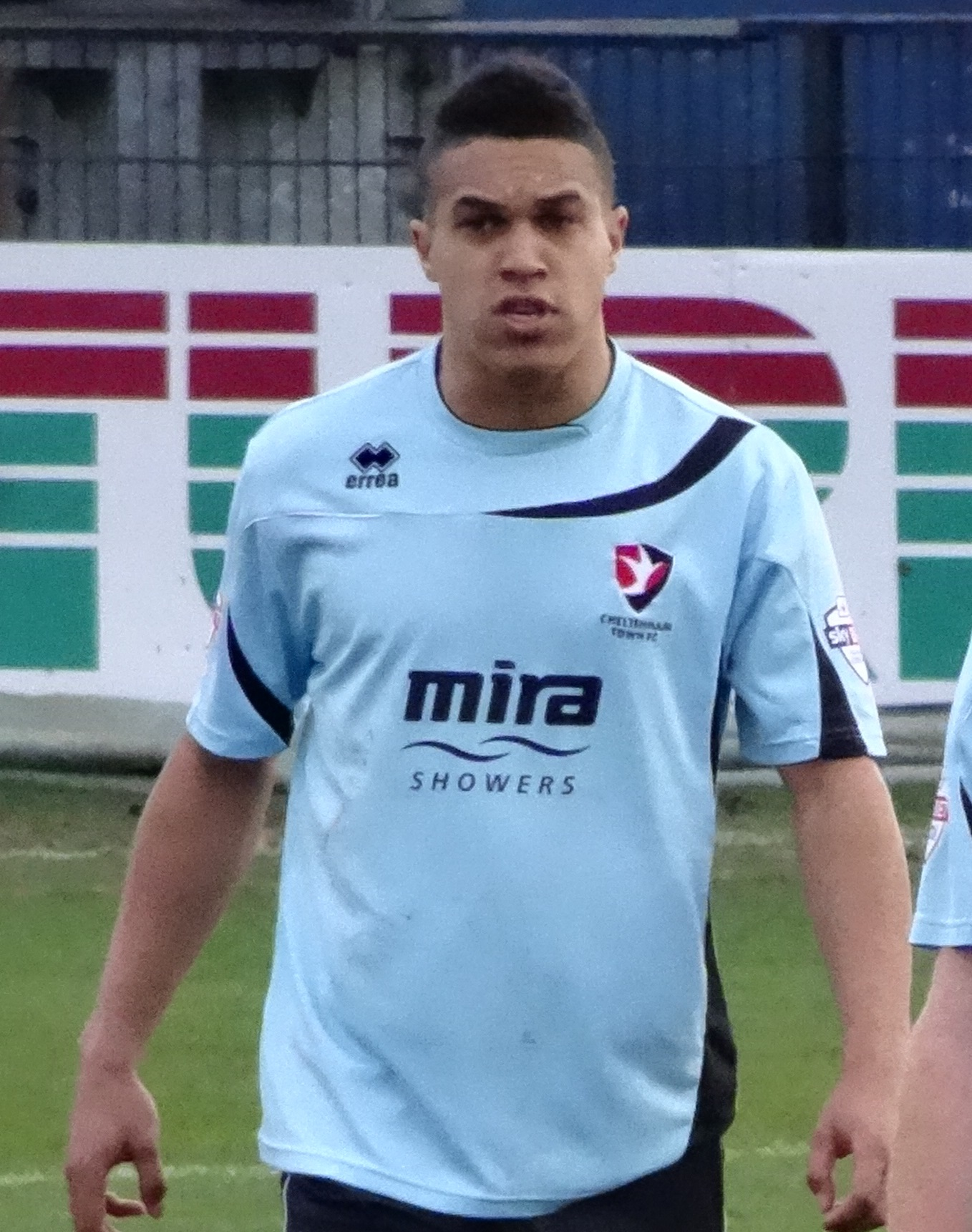
- Brown playing for Cheltenham Town in 2014

Personal information
- Full name: Troy Anthony Fraser Brown
- Date of birth: 17 September 1990 (age 36)
- Place of birth: Croydon, England
- Height: 1.85 m (6 ft 1 in)
- Position: Centre back

Youth career
- 2001–2009: Fulham
- 2009–2010: Ipswich Town

Senior career*
Years	Team	Apps	(Gls)
2010–2011	Ipswich Town	13	(0)
2011–2012	Rotherham United	6	(1)
2012	→ Aldershot Town (loan)	17	(2)
2012–2013	Aldershot Town	34	(3)
2013–2015	Cheltenham Town	82	(5)
2015–2019	Exeter City	106	(4)
2019–2020	Dundee United	5	(0)
2020	Chelmsford City	2	(0)
Total		265	(15)

International career
2006–2007	Wales U17	10	(0)
2007–2008	Wales U19	5	(0)
2010–2012	Wales U21	9	(0)
- * Club domestic league appearances and goals

Troy Anthony Fraser Brown (born 17 September 1990) is a retired professional footballer who played as a defender.

Brown began his senior career at Ipswich Town, making his debut in 2010. He left Ipswich in 2011 and joined Rotherham United, where he spent one season before joining Aldershot Town in 2012, following a loan spell. He spent one season at Aldershot before joining Cheltenham Town. After two seasons at Cheltenham he signed for Exeter City in 2015. He made over one hundred appearances for Exeter over four seasons. After leaving Exeter in 2019, he spent one season in Scotland with Dundee United before joining Chelmsford City in 2020.

Born in England, he played youth football for Wales up to under-21 level.

== Club career ==
=== Ipswich Town ===
Born in Croydon, Brown came through the academy at Fulham, having joined the club at the age of seven. Released during the summer of 2009, he spent time on trial with Charlton Athletic. and Ipswich Town, having to impress two managers (first Jim Magilton and then Roy Keane). He was offered a one-year contract. In April 2010, he was offered a contract extension.

On 2 May 2010, Brown made his league debut for Ipswich, coming off the bench to replace Jack Colback during a 3–0 defeat to Sheffield United in the final game of the 2009–10 season.

He was offered a twelve-month contract extension by the club in April 2011, but rejected it the following month.

=== Rotherham United and Aldershot Town ===
Brown joined Rotherham United in July 2011 as a free agent, signing a two-year contract with the club. Brown made his Rotherham United debut in the opening game of the season, as they beat Oxford United 1–0 at Don Valley Stadium. Brown then scored his first Rotherham United goal, in a 2–2 draw against Barnet on 20 August 2011.

However, Brown's first team run at Rotherham United was soon limited, due to national commitment and only four starts. To earn first team football, Brown joined Aldershot Town on loan until the end of the season. Brown made his Aldershot Town debut the next day, in a 3–0 loss against Oxford United. Brown then scored his first Aldershot Town goal, in a 4–1 win over Barnet on 25 February 2012. Brown then scored his second goal of the season, in a 1–1 draw against Dagenham & Redbridge on 13 April 2012. His first team of runs at the club soon led Aldershot Town confirmed their interests signing him. Upon returning to Rotherham United, Brown was released by the club, having got one year left to his contract. having made six appearances and scoring 1 goal. and then joined Aldershot Town on a permanent basis by newly appointed Aldershot manager Dean Holdsworth on the same day he was released.

Brown's first game after signing for the club on a permanent basis came in the opening game of the season, which he scored in a 2–0 win over Plymouth Argyle. Brown went to score two goals later in the season against Accrington Stanley on 12 January 2013 and another against Torquay United on 19 February 2013. However, an ankle injury during the game put Brown out of action for ten matches (although he was on the bench against Wycombe Wanderers) and made his return, in a 2–0 loss against Southend United on 16 April 2013. Despite the injury crisis, Brown scored three goals in his 32 appearances at the club.

After one season with Aldershot Town, resulting in the club's relegation, Lancashire was among thirteen players made redundant, in a wake of the club's administration. Brown was linked with a move to Yeovil Town, Gillingham and Port Vale.

=== Cheltenham Town ===
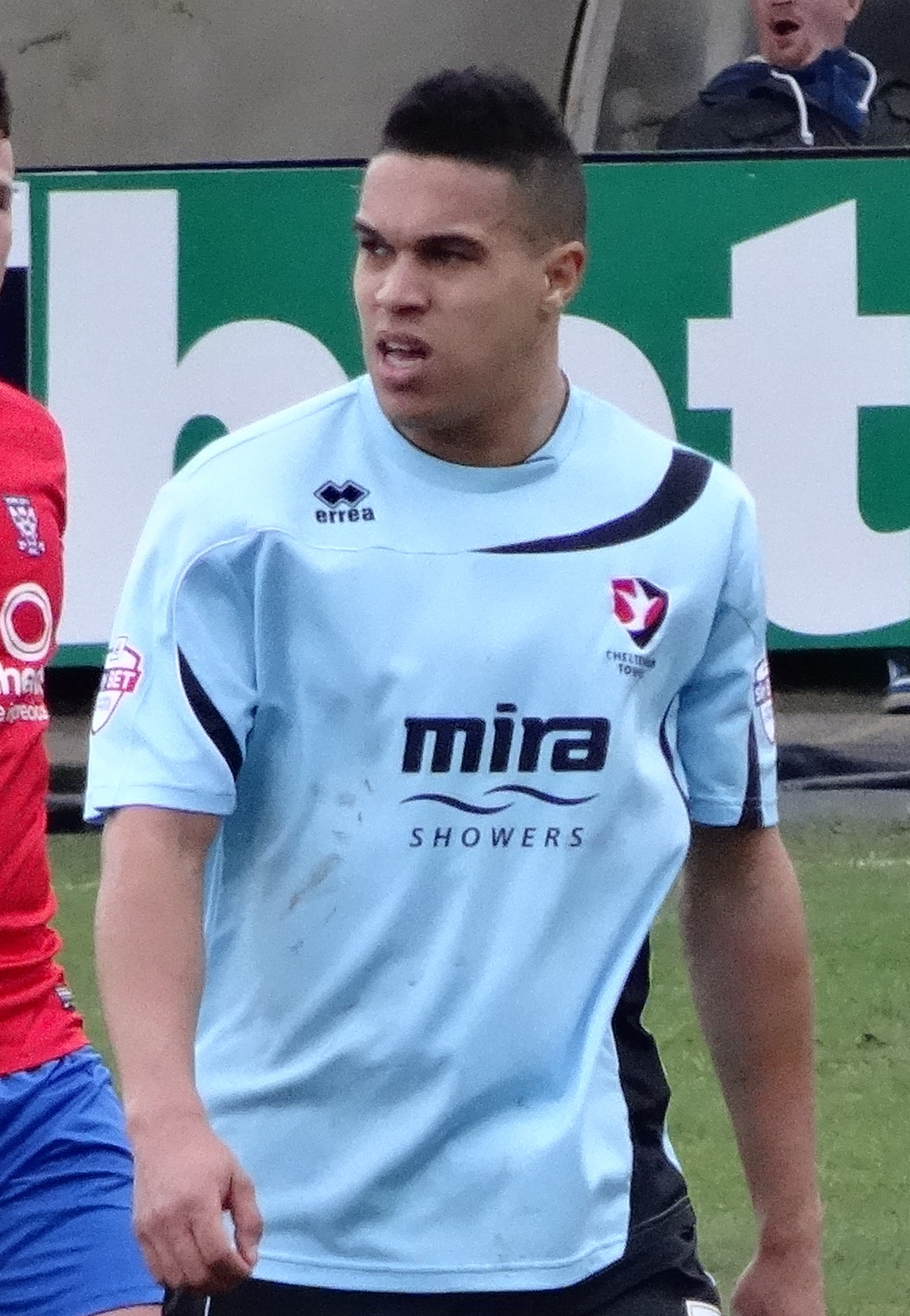
Brown playing for Cheltenham Town in 2014

It was announced on Wednesday 19 June 2013 that Brown would be signing for Cheltenham Town on a 2-year contract. Brown previously turned down offers from Torquay United and Bristol Rovers to join the club. Upon joining the club, Brown was given number 5 shirt.

Brown made his Cheltenham Town debut, in the opening game, in a 2–2 draw against Burton Albion. However to the start of the season, Brown was sidelined for four games after he tore his hamstring during a match against Accrington Stanley and made his return, in a 1–0 win over Wimbledon on 28 September 2013. His return performance was praised by local newspaper the Gloucestershire Echo, describing his performance "coming straight back in and taking charge of a defence that were shipping goals for fun showed a real maturity and talent." Brown scored his first Cheltenham Town goal, in a 2–1 loss against Rochdale on 19 October 2013. Brown scored his second goal of the season, in a 1–0 win over Morecambe, which saw him earned him listed for the Football League Team of the Week. Two weeks later, on 21 December 2013, Brown scored his third goal of the season, in a 2–0 win over Fleetwood Town. Then in the match against Accrington Stanley on 18 January 2014, Brown made a mistake when he allowed George Bowerman to score a free header, in a 2–1 loss. Brown then scored his fourth goal of the season, in a 4–3 loss against Wimbledon on 22 March 2014. Brown made forty-one appearances in all competitions and scoring four goals for the club in his first season there.

Then at the start of the 2014–15 season, Brown remained in the starting eleven throughout the season. Brown scored his first Cheltenham Town goal, in a 2–0 win over Tranmere Rovers on 28 February 2015. Following Matt Taylor's injury, Brown was appointed as captain for two games against Newport County and Portsmouth, which both games saw them earn two points and potential chance of survival in League Two. However, that did not happen, as Cheltenham Town were relegated from League Two.

After eighty-nine appearances for the Robins in all competitions, he was released on 4 May 2015 following their relegation from League Two.

=== Exeter City ===
Brown joined Exeter City on 3 July 2015, making his debut in a 3–2 win against Yeovil Town. In his first season at the club, Brown was part of the Exeter side that held Liverpool to a draw at St James Park in the third round of the FA Cup. He formed an integral part of the Exeter City defence that reached the play-off finals in the 2016–17 and 2017–18 seasons, enjoying a successful partnership at centre back with Jordan Moore-Taylor, though his 2017–18 season was curtailed following a knee injury sustained against Accrington Stanley in November 2017.

In an attempt to address the injury issues that had limited his playing time the previous season, in September 2018 Brown underwent surgery on his knee. He returned to the Exeter team sheet in March 2019, though struggled with fitness and missed the final three fixtures of the season following an injury sustained in a match against Crawley Town. Brown was released by Exeter at the end of the 2018–19 season.

=== Dundee United ===
In August 2019, Brown was on the verge of joining Bury, but this move did not happen prior to Bury's expulsion from the English Football League. On 9 September 2019, Brown signed for Scottish Championship club Dundee United, agreeing a six-month contract. Dundee United's manager Robbie Neilson revealed that he had been interested in signing Brown in January 2019, but disclosed that he decided not to pursue the player at that time as he felt Brown had "a couple of wee niggles". Neilson was keen to add a central defender to his squad following the discovery that an injury to Mark Connolly was likely to rule the player out of the team for several months. Brown left United in January 2020 after making five appearances.

=== Chelmsford City ===
On 21 February 2020, following the departure of Adrian Cașcaval from the club, Brown signed for Chelmsford City of National League South. In August 2020, Chelmsford confirmed the departure of Brown from the club.

== International career ==
Brown made his debut for Wales at under-17 level on 20 April 2006 in a 2–2 draw with USA. After winning two more caps in friendly matches against Bulgaria, he was named in the squad for both the qualifying round and elite round of the 2007 UEFA European Under-17 Football Championship, winning his last cap at under-17 level in the final group game of the elite round in a 3–0 defeat to Belarus.

In 2007, Brown moved up to under-19 level for the first time and was later part of the squad that played in the 2008 Milk Cup. Three years later, he was called up for the under-21s for the first time, going on to earn nine caps.

== Career statistics ==
As of 28 October 2019

Club	Season	League			FA Cup		League Cup		Other		Total	
Club	Season	Division	Apps	Goals	Apps	Goals	Apps	Goals	Apps	Goals	Apps	Goals
Ipswich Town	2009–10	Championship	1	0	0	0	0	0	–		1	0
Ipswich Town	2010–11	Championship	12	0	1	0	3	0	–		16	0
Ipswich Town	Total		13	0	1	0	3	0	0	0	17	0
Rotherham United	2011–12	League Two	6	1	0	0	0	0	0	0	6	1
Aldershot Town (loan)	2011–12	League Two	17	2	0	0	0	0	0	0	17	2
Aldershot Town	2012–13	League Two	34	3	4	0	1	0	2 (Note: Appearances in the EFL Trophy.)	0	41	3
Cheltenham Town	2013–14	League Two	39	4	1	0	1	0	0	0	41	4
Cheltenham Town	2014–15	League Two	43	1	2	0	1	0	2	0	48	1
Cheltenham Town	Total		82	5	3	0	2	0	2	0	89	5
Exeter City	2015–16	League Two	40	1	4	0	2	0	1	0	47	1
Exeter City	2016–17	League Two	30	2	0	0	1	0	3 (Note: Appearances in the League Two play-offs)	0	34	2
Exeter City	2017–18	League Two	25	1	1	0	1	0	1	0	28	1
Exeter City	2018–19	League Two	11	0	0	0	1	1	0	0	12	1
Exeter City	Total		106	4	5	0	5	1	5	0	121	5
Dundee United	2019–20	Scottish Championship	5	0	0	0	0	0	0	0	5	0
Career total			263	15	13	0	11	1	9	0	296	16
