= Eusébio Bancessi =

Bissau-Guinean footballer

Personal information
- Full name: Eusébio Armando Gomes Bancessi
- Date of birth: 4 August 1995 (age 31)
- Place of birth: Bissau, Guinea-Bissau
- Height: 1.79 m (5 ft 10 in)
- Position: Winger

Youth career
- –2012: Sporting CP
- 2012–2013: Benfica
- 2013–2014: Wolverhampton Wanderers

Senior career*
Years	Team	Apps	(Gls)
2013–2016	Wolverhampton Wanderers	0	(0)
2014	→ Cheltenham Town (loan)	4	(0)
2016	→ Telford United (loan)	4	(1)
2017	Pogoń Siedlce	12	(3)
2017–2018	Olimpia Grudziądz	21	(2)
2019–2022	Rapperswil-Jona	40	(4)
- * Club domestic league appearances and goals as of 11:29, 4 August 2024 (UTC)

Eusébio Armando Gomes Bancessi (born 4 August 1995) is a Bissau-Guinean footballer who plays as a winger. He is currently a free agent.

== Career ==
Bancessi was part of the youth system at Portuguese clubs Sporting CP and Benfica before moving to England in July 2013 to join the academy of Wolverhampton Wanderers. After scoring regularly in the Under-21 Premier League he was selected in several matchday squads at first team level as Wolves won the League One title, but he remained only an unused substitute on those occasions. During the close season he signed a new contract with Wolves that runs until summer 2017 (with the option of a further year).

In October 2014, he was loaned to League Two side Cheltenham Town for a month, for whom he made his professional debut on 11 October 2014 against Shrewsbury, in the first of four appearances for the club.

Bancessi joined Telford United on a one-month loan and he made his debut against Gainsborough Trinity wearing the number 7 shirt.

On 12 August 2019, Swiss club FC Rapperswil-Jona announced the signing of Bancessi. Following 40 league appearances for the club, Bancessi was released in February 2022.

== Honours ==
Wolverhampton Wanderers

- Football League One: 2013–14
