= 2013–14 Cheltenham Town F.C. season =

Cheltenham Town
2013–14 season
- Chairman: Paul Baker
- Manager: Mark Yates
- Stadium: Whaddon Road
- League Two: 17th
- FA Cup: First round
- League Cup: Second round
- Football League Trophy: First round
- Top goalscorer: League: Byron Harrison (13); All: Byron Harrison (15)
- Highest home attendance: 4,776 vs Portsmouth (7 September)
- Lowest home attendance: 2,050 vs Morecambe (22 October)
- Average home league attendance: 2,989

The 2013-14 season was the 127th season of Cheltenham Town's existence, and their fourteenth in the Football League since promotion from Conference National in 2000.

== League Two ==
=== League table ===
Pos	Team	Pld	W	D	L	GF	GA	GD	Pts
15	Accrington Stanley	46	14	15	17	54	56	−2	57
16	Exeter City	46	14	13	19	54	57	−3	55
17	Cheltenham Town	46	13	16	17	53	63	−10	55
18	Morecambe	46	13	15	18	52	64	−12	54
19	Hartlepool United	46	14	11	21	50	56	−6	53

Updated to match(es) played on 3 May 2014. Source: BBC Sport
Rules for classification: 1) Points; 2) Goal difference; 3) Number of goals scored

Overall								Home						Away					
Pld	W	D	L	GF	GA	GD	Pts	W	D	L	GF	GA	GD	W	D	L	GF	GA	GD
46	13	16	17	53	63	−10	55	5	9	9	29	35	−6	8	7	8	24	28	−4

Last updated: 4 May 2014.
Source: Football League Official Site

=== Results by matchday ===
Round	1	2	3	4	5	6	7	8	9	10	11	12	13	14	15	16	17	18	19	20	21	22	23	24	25	26	27	28	29	30	31	32	33	34	35	36	37	38	39	40	41	42	43	44	45	46
Ground	H	A	H	A	A	H	H	A	H	A	A	H	H	A	H	A	H	H	A	A	H	A	H	H	A	H	A	H	A	A	A	H	H	A	A	H	H	A	H	A	H	A	H	A	A	H
Result	D	L	L	W	L	D	D	L	W	L	W	L	W	D	D	W	D	D	D	W	D	W	W	L	L	L	D	D	D	L	W	L	W	D	D	W	D	L	L	W	L	D	L	W	L	L
Position	11	18	21	21	21	20	20	21	19	22	17	17	17	17	18	17	17	16	14	13	13	11	10	10	12	12	13	14	15	15	15	17	13	12	14	11	11	13	14	11	13	15	15	16	16	17

Updated to match(es) played on 11 May 2014. Source: Statto.com
A = Away; H = Home; W = Win; D = Draw; L = Loss

=== Matches ===
The fixtures for the 2014–15 season were announced on 18 June 2014 at 9am.

3 August 2013 1	Cheltenham Town	2–2	Burton Albion	Cheltenham
15:00	Cureton 18'; Harrison 32'	BBC Report	Kee 45' (pen.); Delap 56'	Stadium: Whaddon Road; Attendance: 3,189; Referee: Fred Graham

10 August 2013 2	Chesterfield	2–0	Cheltenham Town	Chesterfield
15:00	Roberts 23'; Doyle 89'	BBC Report		Stadium: Proact Stadium; Attendance: 5,367; Referee: Michael Bull

17 August 2013 3	Cheltenham Town	1–3	Plymouth Argyle	Cheltenham
15:00	Richards 72'	BBC Report	Morgan 18'; Hourihane 27'; Boco 38'	Stadium: Whaddon Road; Attendance: 3,450; Referee: Charles Breakspear

24 August 2013 4	Accrington Stanley	0–1	Cheltenham Town	Accrington
15:00		BBC Report	Taylor 71'	Stadium: Crown Ground; Attendance: 1,224; Referee: Scott Mathieson

31 August 2013 5	Bury	4–1	Cheltenham Town	Bury
15:00	Mayor 9'; Procter 12'; Cameron 17'; Reindorf 76'	BBC Report	Procter 12' (o.g.)	Stadium: Gigg Lane; Attendance: 2,910; Referee: Scott Duncan

7 September 2013 6	Cheltenham Town	2–2	Portsmouth	Cheltenham
15:00	McGlashan 36', 90+2'	BBC Report	Agyemang 5'; Ertl 44' (yellow card) 90+5'	Stadium: Whaddon Road; Attendance: 4,776; Referee: Brendan Malone

14 September 2013 7	Cheltenham Town	2–2	Oxford United	Cheltenham
15:00	Harrison 8'; Gornell 51'	BBC Report	Kitson 34'; Mullins 57'	Stadium: Whaddon Road; Attendance: 3,906

21 September 2013 8	Torquay United	4–2	Cheltenham Town	Torquay
15:00	Ball 2' 45'; Hawley 49'; Downes (yellow card) 50'; Chapell 89'	BBC Report	Harrison 13'; Noble (yellow card) 45'; Gornell 65'	Stadium: Plainmoor; Attendance: 2,407; Referee: Darren Deadman

28 September 2013 9	Cheltenham Town	1–0	AFC Wimbledon	Cheltenham
15:00	Noble (yellow card) 72'; Cureton 90+5'	BBC Report		Stadium: Whaddon Road; Attendance: 3,032; Referee: Darren Drysdale

5 October 2013 10	Scunthorpe United	2–0	Cheltenham Town	Scunthorpe
15:00	Esajas 6'; Winnall 90'	BBC Report		Stadium: Glanford Park; Attendance: 3,191; Referee: Darren Bond

12 October 2013 11	Dagenham & Redbridge	1–2	Cheltenham Town	Dagenham
15:00	Ogogo 40'	BBC Report	Cureton 40'; Lowe 59'	Stadium: Victoria Road; Attendance: 1,727; Referee: Keith Hill

19 October 2013 12	Cheltenham Town	1–2	Rochdale	Cheltenham
15:00	Brown 63'	BBC Report	Henderson 82' 90'	Stadium: Whaddon Road; Attendance: 2,887; Referee: Gavin Ward

22 October 2013 13	Cheltenham Town	3–0	Morecambe	Cheltenham
19:45	Richards 45'; Gornell 62'; Harrison 82'	BBC Report		Stadium: Whaddon Road; Attendance: 2,050; Referee: Andy Davies

26 October 2013 14	Northampton Town	1–1	Cheltenham Town	Northampton
14:00	Norris 44'	BBC Report	Harrison 10'	Stadium: Sixfields Stadium; Attendance: 4,033

2 November 2013 15	Cheltenham Town	2–2	York City	Cheltenham
15:00	Harrison 12'; Richards 45'	BBC Report	Bowman 20', 54'	Stadium: Whaddon Road; Attendance: 2,706

16 November 2013 16	Wycombe Wanderers	1–2	Cheltenham Town	High Wycombe
15:00	McClure 66'	BBC Report	Cureton 56'; Knott 67' (o.g.)	Stadium: Adams Park; Attendance: 3,207

23 November 2013 17	Cheltenham Town	0–0	Newport County	Cheltenham
15:00		BBC Report		Stadium: Whaddon Road; Attendance: 3,501; Referee: Andy Madley

26 November 2013 18	Cheltenham Town	0–0	Bristol Rovers	Cheltenham
19:45		BBC Report		Stadium: Whaddon Road; Attendance: 3,556; Referee: David Coote

30 November 2013 19	Southend United	1–1	Cheltenham Town	Southend-on-Sea
15:00	Hurst 41'	BBC Report	Richards 90' (pen.)	Stadium: Roots Hall; Attendance: 5,677; Referee: Trevor Kettle

7 December 2013 20	Morecambe	0–1	Cheltenham Town	Morecambe
15:00		BBC Report	Brown 80'	Stadium: Globe Arena; Attendance: 1,290; Referee: Kevin Wright

14 December 2013 21	Cheltenham Town	2–2	Hartlepool United	Cheltenham
15:00	McGlashan 4'; Roofe 38'	BBC Report	Franks 53', 71'	Stadium: Whaddon Road; Attendance: 2,491; Referee: Steven Rushton

21 December 2013 22	Fleetwood Town	0–2	Cheltenham Town	Fleetwood
15:00		BBC Report	Brown 1'; McGlashan 90'	Stadium: Highbury Stadium; Attendance: 2,300; Referee: Chris Sarginson

26 December 2013 23	Cheltenham Town	1–0	Exeter City	Cheltenham
15:00	Cureton 13'	BBC Report		Stadium: Whaddon Road; Attendance: 3,562; Referee: Simon Hooper

29 December 2013 24	Cheltenham Town	1–2	Mansfield Town	Cheltenham
15:00	Jombati 86'	BBC Report	Howell 21'; Rhead 45'	Stadium: Whaddon Road; Attendance: 2,928; Referee: Steve Martin

11 January 2014 25	Burton Albion	2–1	Cheltenham Town	Burton-upon-Trent
15:00	Knowles 72', 85'	BBC Report	Harrison 62'	Stadium: Pirelli Stadium; Attendance: 2,510; Referee: Seb Stockbridge

18 January 2014 26	Cheltenham Town	1–2	Accrington Stanley	Cheltenham
15:00	Cureton 72'	BBC Report	Bowerman 15'; Joyce 43'	Stadium: Whaddon Road; Attendance: 2,648; Referee: Tim Robinson

25 January 2014 27	Plymouth Argyle	2–1	Cheltenham Town	Plymouth
15:00	Young 83'	BBC Report	Harrison 53'	Stadium: Home Park; Attendance: 6,735; Referee: Lee Collins

1 February 2014 28	Cheltenham Town	1–1	Northampton Town	Cheltenham
15:00	Cureton 1'	BBC Report	Blair 76'	Stadium: Whaddon Road; Attendance: 2,707; Referee: Paul Tierney

8 February 2014 29	York City	0–0	Cheltenham Town	York
15:00		BBC Report		Stadium: Bootham Crescent; Attendance: 3,148; Referee: Darren Handley

11 February 2014 30	Bristol Rovers	1–0	Cheltenham Town	Bristol
19:45	O'Toole 34'	BBC Report		Stadium: Memorial Stadium; Attendance: 5,808; Referee: Ian Williamson

22 February 2014 31	Newport County	0–1	Cheltenham Town	Newport, Wales
15:00		BBC Report	Vincent 23'	Stadium: Rodney Parade; Attendance: 3,130; Referee: Steven Rushton

25 February 2014 32	Cheltenham Town	1–4	Chesterfield	Cheltenham
19:45	Harrison 57'	BBC Report	Gardner 22'; Doyle 23'; Banks 26'; Cooper 29'	Stadium: Whaddon Road; Attendance: 2,317; Referee: Graham Salisbury

1 March 2014 33	Cheltenham Town	2–1	Bury	Cheltenham
15:00	Vincent 18'; Harrison 82'	BBC Report	Platt 16'	Stadium: Whaddon Road; Attendance: 2,737; Referee: Andy Woolmer

8 March 2014 34	Portsmouth	0–0	Cheltenham Town	Portsmouth
15:00		BBC Report		Stadium: Fratton Park; Attendance: 17,254; Referee: Michael Bull

11 March 2014 35	Oxford United	1–1	Cheltenham Town	Oxford
19:45	Williams 78'	BBC Report	Cureton 84'	Stadium: Kassam Stadium; Attendance: 4,606; Referee: Tim Robinson

15 March 2014 36	Cheltenham Town	1–0	Torquay United	Cheltenham
15:00	Richards 75'	BBC Report		Stadium: Whaddon Road; Attendance: 3,105; Referee: Mark Haywood

18 March 2014 37	Cheltenham Town	1–1	Wycombe Wanderers	Cheltenham
19:45	Harrison 68'	BBC Report	Morgan 79' (pen.)	Stadium: Whaddon Road; Attendance: 2,267; Referee: Tony Harrington

22 March 2014 38	AFC Wimbledon	4–3	Cheltenham Town	Kingston upon Thames
15:00	Hylton 69', 71'; Nicholson 70'; Midson 90+7'	BBC Report	Brown 5'; McGlashan 49'; Taylor 74'	Stadium: Kingsmeadow; Attendance: 3,670; Referee: Jeremy Simpson

25 March 2014 39	Cheltenham Town	0–2	Scunthorpe United	Cheltenham
19:45		BBC Report	Winnall 45+1', 59'	Stadium: Whaddon Road; Attendance: 2,080; Referee: Charles Breakspear

29 March 2014 40	Hartlepool United	0–1	Cheltenham Town	Hartlepool
15:00		BBC Report	McGlashan 74'	Stadium: Victoria Park; Attendance: 3,328; Referee: Graham Salisbury

5 April 2014 41	Cheltenham Town	1–2	Southend United	Cheltenham
15:00	Harrison 45'	BBC Report	Corr 64'; Hurst 67'	Stadium: Whaddon Road; Attendance: 2,949; Referee: Michael Naylor

12 April 2014 42	Exeter City	1–1	Cheltenham Town	Exeter
15:00	Jordan Moore 12'	BBC Report	Harrison 27'	Stadium: St James Park; Attendance: 3,353; Referee: Lee Collins

18 April 2014 43	Cheltenham Town	1–2	Fleetwood Town	Cheltenham
15:00	Cureton 32'	BBC Report	Sarcevic 55' (pen.); Morris 65'	Stadium: Whaddon Road; Attendance: 2,890; Referee: Graham Horwood

21 April 2014 44	Mansfield Town	0–2	Cheltenham Town	Mansfield
15:00		BBC Report	Cureton 57', 79'	Stadium: Field Mill; Attendance: 3,586; Referee: Andy Woolmer

26 April 2014 45	Rochdale	2–0	Cheltenham Town	Rochdale
15:00	Vincenti 11'; Henderson 16'	BBC Report		Stadium: Spotland Stadium; Attendance: 4,372; Referee: Oliver Langford

3 May 2014 46	Cheltenham Town	2–3	Dagenham & Redbridge	Cheltenham
15:00	Elliott 18'; Richards 24'	BBC Report	Jombati 21' (o.g.); Doe 44'; Azeez 68'	Stadium: Whaddon Road; Attendance: 3,002; Referee: Tony Harrington

== FA Cup ==
9 November 2013 First round	Tamworth (5)	1–0	Cheltenham Town	Tamworth
15:00	Chadwick 20'	BBC Report		Stadium: The Lamb Ground; Attendance: 1,566; Referee: Richard Clark

== Football League Cup ==
6 August 2013 First round	Cheltenham Town	4–3 (a.e.t.)	Crawley Town (3)	Cheltenham
19:45	Richards 40'; Gornell 70'; Harrison 75', 114'	BBC Report	Alexander 23'; Adams 59', 65'	Stadium: Whaddon Road; Attendance: 1,562; Referee: Oliver Langford

27 August 2013 Second round	West Ham United (1)	2–1	Cheltenham Town	London
19:45	Morrison (yellow card) 37' (goal) 46'; Vaz Tê 42'; Adrián (yellow card) 56'	BBC Report	Richards 59' (pen.); Elliot (yellow card) 62'	Stadium: Boleyn Ground; Attendance: 23,440; Referee: Graham Scott

== Football League Trophy ==
3 September 2013 First round	Cheltenham Town	3–3 (4–5 p)	Plymouth Argyle (4)	Cheltenham
19:45	Gillespie 5', 61'; Taylor 67'	BBC Report	Boco 15'; Alessandra 17'; Bencherif 57'	Stadium: Whaddon Road; Attendance: 1,236; Referee: Mark Heywood
	Penalties
	Lowe (penalty scored); Noble (penalty scored); Deering (penalty scored); Taylor (penalty scored); Harrison (penalty missed)		(penalty scored) Boco; (penalty scored) Alessandra; (penalty scored) Hourihane; (penalty scored) Reckord; (penalty scored) Morgan

== Transfers and loans ==
=== In ===
Pos	Player	Transferred from	Fee	Date	Source
DF	(England) Craig Braham-Barrett	(England) Macclesfield Town	Free transfer		
DF	(England) Jamie Cureton	(England) Exeter City	Free transfer	17 June 2013	
CB	(Wales) Troy Brown	(England) Aldershot Town	Free transfer	21 June 2013	
MF	(England) Matt Richards	(England) Shrewsbury Town	Free transfer	5 July 2013	
ST	(England) Terry Gornell	(England) Rochdale	Free transfer	12 July 2013	
MF	(England) Ashley Vincent	(England) Port Vale	Free transfer	17 July 2013	

=== Out ===
Pos	Player	Transferred To	Fee	Date	Source
MF	(England) Marlon Pack	Unattached	Free transfer	2 August 2013	
WNG/ FW	(Wales) Kaid Mohamed	Port Vale	Free transfer	1 June 2013	
	(England) Bagasan Graham	Chelmsford City	Free transfer	August 2014	

=== Loan In ===
Position	Player	Loaned To	Start	End	Source
CB	(England) Ryan Inniss	(England) Crystal Palace	1 August 2013	1 October 2013	
ST	(England) Steven Gillespie	(England) Fleetwood Town	15 August 2013	15 September 2013	
MF	(England) David Noble	(England) Fleetwood Town	2 September 2013	27 May 2014	
MF	(England) Kemar Roofe	(England) West Bromwich Albion	28 November 2013	2 February 2014	
DF	(England) James Wilson	(England) Bristol City	28 November 2013	2 October 2013	
MF/ST	(England) Toby Ajala	(England) Bristol City	28 November 2013	10 January 2014	
DF	(England) Connor Goldson	(England) Shrewsbury Town	28 November 2013	10 January 2014	
	(England) Michael Ihiekwe	(England) Wolverhampton Wanderers	10 January 2014	13 June 2014	
	(Wales) Lee Lucas	(Wales) Swansea City	30 January 2014	1 March 2014	
	(England) Billy Daniels	(England) Coventry City	25 March 2014	13 June 2014	

=== Loan out ===
Position	Player	Loaned To	Start	End	Source
DF	(England) Keith Lowe	(England) York City	20 November 2013	6 January 2014	
