= 2007–08 Tranmere Rovers F.C. season =

Tranmere Rovers
2007–08 season
- Manager: Ronnie Moore
- Stadium: Prenton Park
- League One: 11th
- FA Cup: Third round
- Football League Cup: First round
- Johnstones Paint Trophy: Southern first round

This page shows the progress of Tranmere Rovers F.C. in the 2007–08 football season. During the season, Tranmere Rovers competed in League One in the English league system.

== League table ==
Pos	Team	Pld	W	D	L	GF	GA	GD	Pts
9	Northampton Town	46	17	15	14	60	55	+5	66
10	Huddersfield Town	46	20	6	20	50	62	−12	66
11	Tranmere Rovers	46	18	11	17	52	47	+5	65
12	Walsall	46	16	16	14	52	46	+6	64
13	Swindon Town	46	16	13	17	63	56	+7	61

Updated to match(es) played on unknown. Source: The Football League
Rules for classification: 1) points; 2) goal difference; 3) number of goals scored.

== Results ==
=== Football League One ===
11 August 2007 1	Tranmere Rovers	1–2	Leeds United	Birkenhead
	Greenacre 22'		Heath 55'; Kandol 89'	Stadium: Prenton Park; Attendance: 11,008

18 August 2007 2	Gillingham	0–2	Tranmere Rovers	Gillingham
			Greenacre 19'; Davies 50'	Stadium: Priestfield; Attendance: 5,302

25 August 2007 3	Tranmere Rovers	2–0	Brighton & Hove Albion	Birkenhead
	Greenacre 78'; Shuker 90'		Whing (red card) 90'	Stadium: Prenton Park; Attendance: 5,670

1 September 2007 4	Yeovil Town	1–1	Tranmere Rovers	Yeovil
	Stewart 57'		Davies 90'	Stadium: Huish Park; Attendance: 4,985

8 September 2007 5	Carlisle United	0–1	Tranmere Rovers	Carlisle
			Curran 42'	Stadium: Brunton Park; Attendance: 6,556

14 September 2007 6	Tranmere Rovers	2–1	Luton Town	Birkenhead
	Curran 83'; Kay 86'		Furlong 5'	Stadium: Prenton Park; Attendance: 6,525

22 September 2007 7	Cheltenham Town	1–1	Tranmere Rovers	Cheltenham
	Caines 50'		Greenacre 34'	Stadium: Whaddon Road; Attendance: 3,742

29 September 2007 8	Tranmere Rovers	2–2	Northampton Town	Birkenhead
	Shuker 69'; Taylor 88'		Kirk 12'; Hübertz 39'	Stadium: Prenton Park; Attendance: 6,338

2 October 2007 9	Tranmere Rovers	1–1	Crewe Alexandra	Birkenhead
	Shuker 65'		Roberts 56' (pen.)	Stadium: Prenton Park; Attendance: 6,155

6 October 2007 10	Southend United	1–2	Tranmere Rovers	Southend-on-sea
	Barrett 43'		Chorley 30'; Taylor 55'	Stadium: Roots Hall; Attendance: 7,619

12 October 2007 11	Tranmere Rovers	0–0	Walsall	Birkenhead
				Stadium: Prenton Park; Attendance: 7,697

20 October 2007 12	Swindon Town	1–0	Tranmere Rovers	Swindon
	Corr 88'			Stadium: County Ground; Attendance: 6,430

26 October 2007 13	Tranmere Rovers	3–0	Huddersfield Town	Birkenhead
	McLaren 29'; Cansdell-Sherriff 53'; Taylor 83'			Stadium: Prenton Park; Attendance: 6,008

3 November 2007 14	Nottingham Forest	2–0	Tranmere Rovers	Nottingham
	Agogo 50' (pen.); Tyson 78'			Stadium: City Ground; Attendance: 16,825

6 November 2007 15	Tranmere Rovers	0–1	Oldham Athletic	Birkenhead
			Davies 90'	Stadium: Prenton Park; Attendance: 5,473

17 November 2007 16	Doncaster Rovers	0–0	Tranmere Rovers	Doncaster
			Tremarco (red card) 47'	Stadium: Keepmoat Stadium; Attendance: 7,070

24 November 2007 17	Tranmere Rovers	0–1	Swansea City	Birkenhead
			Jennings 81' (o.g.)	Stadium: Prenton Park; Attendance: 6,149

4 December 2007 18	Hartlepool United	3–1	Tranmere Rovers	Hartlepool
	Liddle 3'; Brown 11'; Porter 58'		Cansdell-Sherriff 54'	Stadium: Victoria Park; Attendance: 3,583

8 December 2007 19	Tranmere Rovers	3–1	Bournemouth	Birkenhead
	Zola 23'; Greenacre 28' (pen.); Jennings 63'		Vokes 76'	Stadium: Prenton Park; Attendance: 5,043

15 December 2007 20	Port Vale	0–0	Tranmere Rovers	Stoke on Trent
				Stadium: Vale Park; Attendance: 3,604

22 December 2007 21	Luton Town	1–0	Tranmere Rovers	Luton
	Edwards 70'			Stadium: Kenilworth Road; Attendance: 6,070

26 December 2007 22	Tranmere Rovers	2–0	Carlisle United	Birkenhead
	McLaren 16'; Kay 45'			Stadium: Prenton Park; Attendance: 8,516

29 December 2007 23	Tranmere Rovers	1–0	Cheltenham Town	Birkenhead
	Zola 59'			Stadium: Prenton Park; Attendance: 6,111

1 January 2008 24	Crewe Alexandra	4–3	Tranmere Rovers	Crewe
	Roberts 30' (pen.), 48'; Maynard 67'; O'Donnell 89'		Taylor 8'; Greenacre 31'; Goodison (red card) 65'; McLaren 74'	Stadium: Gresty Road; Attendance: 5,137

8 January 2008 25	Leyton Orient	3–0	Tranmere Rovers	London
	Gray 11'; Thornton 84'; Demetriou 90'		Cansdell-Sherriff (red card) 50'	Stadium: Matchroom Stadium; Attendance: 3,447

11 January 2008 26	Tranmere Rovers	0–2	Bristol Rovers	Birkenhead
			Williams 12'; Lambert 58'	Stadium: Prenton Park; Attendance: 5,887

19 January 2008 27	Millwall	0–1	Tranmere Rovers	London
			Kay 87'	Stadium: The Den; Attendance: 8,925

26 January 2008 28	Tranmere Rovers	2–1	Yeovil Town	Birkenhead
	Zola 4'; Myrie-Williams 62' (pen.)		Kirk 51'; Bircham (red card) 71'	Stadium: Prenton Park; Attendance: 5,386

29 January 2008 29	Tranmere Rovers	2–0	Gillingham	Birkenhead
	McLaren 7'; Zola 14'			Stadium: Prenton Park; Attendance: 5,006

2 February 2008 30	Leeds United	0–2	Tranmere Rovers	Leeds
			Myrie-Williams 61'; Thomas-Moore 69'	Stadium: Elland Road; Attendance: 24,907

9 February 2008 31	Tranmere Rovers	1–1	Leyton Orient	Birkenhead
	Zola 2'		Chambers 87'	Stadium: Prenton Park; Attendance: 6,530

12 February 2008 32	Brighton & Hove Albion	0–0	Tranmere Rovers	Brighton
				Stadium: Withdean Stadium; Attendance: 4,797

16 February 2008 33	Tranmere Rovers	2–0	Millwall	Birkenhead
	Taylor 10'; Thomas-Moore 45'			Stadium: Prenton Park; Attendance: 6,108

23 February 2008 34	Bristol Rovers	1–1	Tranmere Rovers	Bristol
	Disley 81'		Kay 74'	Stadium: Memorial Stadium; Attendance: 7,777

1 March 2008 35	Tranmere Rovers	0–1	Doncaster Rovers	Birkenhead
			Coppinger 2'	Stadium: Prenton Park; Attendance: 7,551

8 March 2008 36	Oldham Athletic	3–1	Tranmere Rovers	Oldham
	Eardley 41' (pen.); Taylor 45'; Alessandra 76'		Jones 70'	Stadium: Boundary Park; Attendance: 5,442

11 March 2008 37	Swansea City	1–1	Tranmere Rovers	Swansea
	Tate 43'		Greenacre 90'	Stadium: Liberty Stadium; Attendance: 11,039

15 March 2008 38	Tranmere Rovers	3–1	Hartlepool United	Birkenhead
	Greenacre 36'; Nelson 64' (o.g.); Cansdell-Sherriff 90'		McCunnie (red card) 34'; Humphreys 71'	Stadium: Prenton Park; Attendance: 5,608

20 March 2008 39	Tranmere Rovers	2–0	Port Vale	Birkenhead
	Greenacre 68' (pen.); Thomas-Moore 88'			Stadium: Prenton Park; Attendance: 6,484

24 March 2008 40	Bournemouth	2–1	Tranmere Rovers	Bournemouth
	Goodison 1' (o.g.); Kuffour 34'		Kay 87'	Stadium: Fitness First Stadium; Attendance: 4,118

29 March 2008 41	Tranmere Rovers	2–1	Swindon Town	Birkenhead
	Jennings 12'; Greenacre 40'		Paynter 68'	Stadium: Prenton Park; Attendance: 5,815

5 April 2008 42	Walsall	2–1	Tranmere Rovers	Walsall
	N'Dour 45'; Demontagnac 59'		Myrie-Williams 3'; Chorley (red card) 40'	Stadium: Banks's Stadium; Attendance: 5,745

12 April 2008 43	Tranmere Rovers	0–2	Nottingham Forest	Birkenhead
			Tyson 34'; Morgan 51'	Stadium: Prenton Park; Attendance: 8,689

19 April 2008 44	Huddersfield Town	1–0	Tranmere Rovers	Huddersfield
	Booth 61'			Stadium: Galpharm Stadium; Attendance: 8,315

26 April 2008 45	Tranmere Rovers	1–0	Southend United	Birkenhead
	Kay 53'			Stadium: Prenton Park; Attendance: 5,842

3 May 2008 46	Northampton Town	2–1	Tranmere Rovers	Northampton
	Akinfenwa 3'; Hübertz 68'		Greenacre 43'; Goodison (red card) 80'	Stadium: Sixfields; Attendance: 5,088

=== FA Cup ===
10 November 2007 Round 1	Chesterfield	1–2	Tranmere Rovers	Chesterfield
	Lester 29'		Greenacre 37' (pen.); Kay 84'; Curran (red card) 90'	Stadium: Saltergate; Attendance: 4,296

1 December 2007 Round 2	Bradford City	0–3	Tranmere Rovers	Bradford
			Jennings 7'; Greenacre 37', 68'	Stadium: Coral Windows Stadium; Attendance: 6,379

5 January 2008 Round 3	Tranmere Rovers	2–2	Hereford United	Birkenhead
	Jennings 75'; Taylor 78'		Smith 65'; Benjamin 76'	Stadium: Prenton Park; Attendance: 6,909

16 January 2008 Round 3 replay	Hereford United	1–0	Tranmere Rovers	Hereford
	Johnson 72'			Stadium: Edgar Street; Attendance: 6,471

=== League Cup ===
14 August 2007 Round 1	Stockport County	1–0	Tranmere Rovers	Stockport
	McNeil 84'			Stadium: Edgeley Park; Attendance: 3,499

=== Football League Trophy ===
4 September 2007 Northern Section Round 1	Tranmere Rovers	0–1	Morecambe	Birkenhead
			Burns 55'	Stadium: Prenton Park; Attendance: 2,557

== Players ==
=== First-team squad ===
Includes all players who were awarded squad numbers during the season.

Note: Flags indicate national team as defined under FIFA eligibility rules; some limited exceptions apply. Players may hold more than one non-FIFA nationality.

No.	Pos.	Nation	Player
1	GK	WAL	Danny Coyne
2	DF	ENG	Robbie Stockdale
4	MF	ENG	Paul McLaren
5	DF	AUS	Shane Cansdell-Sherriff
6	DF	ENG	Antony Kay
7	MF	ENG	John Mullin
8	FW	COD	Calvin Zola
9	FW	ENG	Ian Thomas-Moore
10	FW	ENG	Chris Greenacre
11	MF	PAK	Adnan Ahmed
12	MF	ENG	Steve Jennings
13	GK	ENG	Shane McWeeney
14	DF	ENG	Ben Chorley

No.	Pos.	Nation	Player
15	DF	JAM	Ian Goodison
17	DF	ENG	Andy Taylor
18	FW	ENG	Jennison Myrie-Williams (on loan from Bristol City)
19	FW	ENG	Steve Davies
20	MF	ENG	Paul Henry
21	MF	ENG	Mike Jones
22	DF	WAL	Michael Johnston
23	FW	ENG	Chris Shuker
24	GK	NED	John Achterberg
25	FW	ENG	Craig Curran
26	DF	ENG	Danny Holmes
26	FW	ENG	Terry Gornell

=== Left club during season ===
Note: Flags indicate national team as defined under FIFA eligibility rules; some limited exceptions apply. Players may hold more than one non-FIFA nationality.

No.	Pos.	Nation	Player
16	MF	ENG	Kevin Cooper (returned to parent club Cardiff City following loan spell)
3	DF	ENG	Carl Tremarco (joined Wrexham on 18 January 2008)
9	FW	ENG	Gareth Taylor (joined Doncaster Rovers on 31 January 2008)
