= 2006–07 Tranmere Rovers F.C. season =

Tranmere Rovers
2006–07 season
- Manager: Ronnie Moore
- Stadium: Prenton Park
- League One: 9th
- FA Cup: Second round
- League Cup: First round
- Football League Trophy: Second round
- Top goalscorer: Chris Greenacre (19)

During the 2006–07 English football season, Tranmere Rovers competed in Football League One.

== First-team squad ==
Squad at end of season

Note: Flags indicate national team as defined under FIFA eligibility rules; some limited exceptions apply. Players may hold more than one non-FIFA nationality.

No.	Pos.	Nation	Player
1	GK	(England) ENG	Gavin Ward
2	DF	(Scotland) SCO	Robbie Stockdale (Note: Stockdale was born in Redcar, England, and represented them at U-21 level, but also qualified to represent Scotland internationally and made his international debut for Scotland in April 2002.)
3	DF	(England) ENG	Carl Tremarco
4	MF	(England) ENG	Paul McLaren
5	DF	(Australia) AUS	Shane Cansdell-Sherriff
6	MF	(Republic of Ireland) IRL	Jason McAteer (Note: McAteer was born in Tranmere, England, but also qualified to represent the Republic of Ireland internationally and made his international debut for the Republic of Ireland in March 1994.)
7	MF	(England) ENG	John Mullin
8	FW	(Democratic Republic of the Congo) COD	Calvin Zola
9	FW	(Wales) WAL	Gareth Taylor (Note: Taylor was born in Weston-super-Mare, England, but also qualified to represent Wales internationally through his father and made his international debut for Wales in 1995.)
10	FW	(England) ENG	Chris Greenacre
11	MF	(England) ENG	Kevin Ellison
12	MF	(England) ENG	Steven Jennings
13	GK	(England) ENG	Ben Hinchliffe (on loan from Preston North End)

No.	Pos.	Nation	Player
14	MF	(Republic of Ireland) IRL	John Thompson (on loan from Nottingham Forest)
15	DF	(Jamaica) JAM	Ian Goodison
16	DF	(England) ENG	Chris McCready
17	MF	(England) ENG	Oliver James
18	MF	(England) ENG	Danny Harrison
19	FW	(England) ENG	Steve Davies
20	MF	(England) ENG	Paul Henry
21	MF	(England) ENG	Mike Jones
22	DF	(Wales) WAL	Michael Johnston
23	MF	(England) ENG	Chris Shuker
24	GK	(Netherlands) NED	John Achterberg
25	FW	(England) ENG	Craig Curran
26	GK	(England) ENG	Shane McWeeney

=== Left club during season ===
Note: Flags indicate national team as defined under FIFA eligibility rules; some limited exceptions apply. Players may hold more than one non-FIFA nationality.

No.	Pos.	Nation	Player
26	GK	(England) ENG	Joe Hart (on loan from Manchester City)

== League table ==
Pos	Team	Pld	W	D	L	GF	GA	GD	Pts
7	Swansea City	46	20	12	14	69	53	+16	72
8	Carlisle United	46	19	11	16	54	55	−1	68
9	Tranmere Rovers	46	18	13	15	58	53	+5	67
10	Millwall	46	19	9	18	59	62	−3	66
11	Doncaster Rovers	46	16	15	15	52	47	+5	63

Rules for classification: In the Football League goals scored (GF) takes precedence over goal difference (GD).
