= 2008–09 Tranmere Rovers F.C. season =

Tranmere Rovers
2008–09 season
- Manager: Ronnie Moore
- Stadium: Prenton Park
- League One: 7th
- FA Cup: Second round
- Football League Cup: First round
- Football League Trophy: Northern area semi-finals
Home colours	Away colours	Third colours

During the 2008–09 English football season, Tranmere Rovers F.C. competed in Football League One.

== Season summary ==
In the 2007–08 season, Tranmere finished 11th and their ambition for 2008–09 was the play-offs. Their form in the first half of the season was mixed, but they found themselves in 8th place at Christmas. Tranmere finished 7th, missing out on the play-offs by one point. Despite this 7th-placed finish, manager Ronnie Moore was sacked and replaced by John Barnes in mid-June. A run of 5 games unbeaten in March/April led rovers into the play-off positions with 3 games remaining, but 7th placed Scunthorpe were two points behind and had played two games less. Tranmere lost to fellow play-off contenders Leeds United, but Scunthorpe lost too, leaving Rovers in 6th place. They failed to win their final 2 games, meaning they finished 7th.

== Kit ==
Tranmere's kits were manufactured by Vandanel and sponsored by the Wirral Metropolitan Council.

== Squad ==
Squad at end of season Note: Flags indicate national team as defined under FIFA eligibility rules; some limited exceptions apply. Players may hold more than one non-FIFA nationality.

No.	Pos.	Nation	Player
1	GK	(Wales) WAL	Danny Coyne
3	DF	(England) ENG	Andy Taylor
4	DF	(England) ENG	Ben Chorley
5	DF	(Jamaica) JAM	Ian Goodison
6	MF	(England) ENG	Antony Kay
7	FW	(England) ENG	Bas Savage
9	FW	(England) ENG	Ian Thomas-Moore
10	FW	(England) ENG	Chris Greenacre
11	MF	(Pakistan) PAK	Adnan Ahmed
12	MF	(England) ENG	Steve Jennings
13	DF	(Australia) AUS	Gareth Edds
14	FW	(England) ENG	Terry Gornell
15	DF	(England) ENG	Danny Holmes
16	MF	(The Gambia) GAM	Edrissa Sonko

No.	Pos.	Nation	Player
17	DF	(England) ENG	Luke Waterfall
18	DF	(England) ENG	Aaron Cresswell
19	MF	(England) ENG	Charlie Barnett
20	MF	(England) ENG	Paul Henry
21	FW	(England) ENG	Josh Macauley
22	MF	(Wales) WAL	Ash Taylor
23	MF	(England) ENG	Chris Shuker
24	GK	(Netherlands) NED	John Achterberg
25	FW	(England) ENG	Craig Curran
26	DF	(England) ENG	Ryan Shotton
28	MF	(England) ENG	Robbie Burns
29	GK	(England) ENG	Peter Kennedy
30	MF	(England) ENG	Ryan Fraughan

=== Left club during season ===
Note: Flags indicate national team as defined under FIFA eligibility rules; some limited exceptions apply. Players may hold more than one non-FIFA nationality.

No.	Pos.	Nation	Player
22	GK	(England) ENG	Phillip Palethorpe (Signed for Airbus UK Broughton F.C.)
27	MF	(England) ENG	Mark Wilson (on loan from Doncaster Rovers)
2	DF	(Spain) ESP	Godwin Antwi (on loan from Liverpool)

No.	Pos.	Nation	Player
28	DF	(England) ENG	John Johnson (on loan from Middlesbrough)
8	MF	(Republic of Ireland) IRL	George O'Callaghan (released)
8	MF	(England) ENG	Danny Mayor (on loan from Preston North End)

== Competitions ==
=== League One ===
==== League table ====
Pos	Team	Pld	W	D	L	GF	GA	GD	Pts	Promotion or relegation
5	Millwall	46	25	7	14	63	53	+10	82	Qualification for League One play-offs
6	Scunthorpe United (O, P)	46	22	10	14	82	63	+19	76	Qualification for League One play-offs
7	Tranmere Rovers	46	21	11	14	62	49	+13	74	
8	Southend United	46	21	8	17	58	61	−3	71	
9	Huddersfield Town	46	18	14	14	62	65	−3	68	

Updated to match(es) played on 2 May 2009. Source: The Football League
Rules for classification: 1) points; 2) goal difference; 3) number of goals scored.
(O) Play-off winners; (P) Promoted

==== Matches ====
League One match details
Date	Opponents	Venue	Result	Score F–A	Scorers	Attendance	Ref.
9 August 2008	Swindon Town	A	L	1–3	Savage 85'	7,975	
16 August 2008	Hartlepool United	H	W	1–0	Curran 23'	5,418	
23 August 2008	Leicester City	A	L	1–3	Shuker 80'	17,798	
30 August 2008	Northampton Town	H	W	4–1	Savage 35', Kay 38', Curran 45', Thomas-Moore 90'	5,034	
6 September 2008	Oldham Athletic	H	L	0–1		6,082	
13 September 2008	Huddersfield Town	A	W	2–1	Sonko 39', Shotton 49'	12,128	
20 September 2008	Peterborough United	A	D	2–2		5,735	
26 September 2008	Colchester United	H	L	3–4	Kay 12', Taylor 76', Shotton 78'	5,713	
4 October 2008	Carlisle United	A	W	2–1	Thomas-Moore 1', Shotton 80'	6,093	
11 October 2008	Millwall	H	L	1–3	Savage 90'	5,863	
18 October 2008	Leyton Orient	A	W	1–0	Shuker 39'	5,568	
21 October 2008	Cheltenham Town	H	W	2–0	Savage 69', Sonko 89'	4,535	
24 October 2008	Crewe Alexandra	H	W	2–0	Jennings 51', Shuker 74'	5,790	
28 October 2008	Stockport County	A	D	0–0		6,121	
1 November 2008	Milton Keynes Dons	A	L	0–1		8,185	
15 November 2008	Southend United	H	D	2–2	Thomas-Moore 8', Savage 14'	5,019	
22 November 2008	Yeovil Town	A	L	0–1		3,445	
25 November 2008	Scunthorpe United	H	W	2–0	Sonko 41', Shotton 75'	4,564	
6 December 2008	Leeds United	H	W	2–1	Kay 17', Moore 49'	8,700	
13 December 2008	Bristol Rovers	A	L	0–2		6,217	
20 December 2008	Brighton & Hove Albion	H	W	1–0	Kay 90'	4,885	
26 December 2008	Hereford United	A	D	2–2	Sonko 37', 61'	3,495	
28 December 2008	Walsall	H	W	2–1	Goodison 42', Kay 90'	5,913	
17 January 2009	Millwall	A	L	0–1		8,257	
24 January 2009	Carlisle United	H	W	4–1	Thomas-Moore 49', 77', Edds 53', Jennings 66'	5,924	
27 January 2009	Stockport County	H	W	2–1	Edds 57', Thomas-Moore 90' pen.	5,259	
31 January 2009	Crewe Alexandra	A	L	1–2	Kay 26'	4,936	
7 February 2009	Leyton Orient	H	D	0–0		4,892	
10 February 2009	Colchester United	A	W	1–0	Shotton 50'	3,588	
14 February 2009	Southend United	A	L	1–2	Thomas-Moore 63' pen.	6,507	
17 February 2009	Peterborough United	H	D	1–1	Barnett 16'	4,862	
21 February 2009	Milton Keynes Dons	H	L	1–1	Gornell 83'	5,625	
28 February 2009	Swindon Town	H	W	1–0	Kay 48'	5,153	
3 March 2009	Hartlepool United	A	L	1–2	Chorley 70'	3,033	
7 March 2009	Northampton Town	A	D	1–1	Savage 32'	4,546	
11 March 2009	Leicester City	H	W	2–0	Kay 47', Jennings 83' pen.	6,032	
14 March 2009	Huddersfield Town	H	W	3–1	Kay 6', 53', Savage 50'	5,515	
17 March 2009	Cheltenham Town	A	L	0–1		3,445	
21 March 2009	Oldham Athletic	A	W	2–0	Barnett 57', Thomas-Moore 75' pen.	7,489	
28 March 2009	Brighton & Hove Albion	A	D	0–0		5,819	
5 April 2009	Bristol Rovers	H	W	2–0	Cresswell 37', Thomas-Moore 64'	8,119	
11 April 2009	Walsall	A	W	1–0	Savage 80'	4,206	
13 April 2009	Hereford United	H	W	2–1	Savage 8', Barnett 27'	5,945	
18 April 2009	Leeds United	A	L	1–3	Sodje 27' o.g.	24,360	
25 April 2009	Yeovil Town	H	D	1–1	Kay 78'	8,306	
2 May 2009	Scunthorpe United	A	D	1–1	Curran 39'	8,029	

=== FA Cup ===
FA Cup match details
Round	Date	Opponents	Venue	Result	Score F–A	Scorers	Attendance	Ref.
First round	8 November 2008	Accrington Stanley	A	D	0–0		2,126	
First round replay	13 November 2008	Accrington Stanley	H	W	1–0	Shuker 69'	2,560	
Second round	29 November 2008	Peterborough United	A	D	0–0		5,980	
Second round replay	9 December 2008	Peterborough United	H	L	1–2	Kay 47'	3,139	

=== League Cup ===
League Cup match details
Round	Date	Opponents	Venue	Result	Score F–A	Scorers	Attendance	Ref.
First round	12 August 2008	Grimsby Town	A	L	0–2		1,858	

=== Football League Trophy ===
Football League Trophy match details
Round	Date	Opponents	Venue	Result	Score F–A	Scorers	Attendance	Ref.
First round	2 September 2008	Accrington Stanley	H	W	1–0	Sonko 49'	2,410	
Second round	6 October 2008	Crewe Alexandra	H	W	1–0	Shuker 86'	2,626	
Northern quarter-final	4 November 2008	Morecambe	H	W	1–0	Shotton 45'	2,110	
Northern semi-final	16 December 2008	Scunthorpe United	A	L	1–2	Thomas-Moore 53'	2,669	
