= 2009–10 Tranmere Rovers F.C. season =

Tranmere Rovers
2009–10 season
- Manager: John Barnes (until 9 October); Les Parry (caretaker from 9 October to 16 December, permanent manager thereafter)
- Stadium: Prenton Park
- Football League One: 19th
- FA Cup: Third round
- League Cup: Second round
- Football League Trophy: Second round
- Top goalscorer: Ian Thomas-Moore (13)
- Average home league attendance: 5,671

During the 2009–10 English football season, Tranmere Rovers F.C. competed in Football League One.

== Season summary ==
Jamaica manager John Barnes was appointed as Tranmere manager in mid-June, but only lasted until October. The Birkenhead club won only three of their first 14 games, culminating in a 5–0 loss at Millwall, with Barnes and his assistant Jason McAteer sacked six days later. Long-standing physio Les Parry was announced as caretaker manager, and was appointed permanently in December after winning 18 points during his time in charge. An away win at Stockport County on the last day of the season secured Tranmere's survival in League One, by a single point.

== Kit ==
Tranmere's kits were manufactured by Vandanel and sponsored by the Wirral Metropolitan Council.

== Players ==
=== First-team squad ===
Squad at end of season

Note: Flags indicate national team as defined under FIFA eligibility rules; some limited exceptions apply. Players may hold more than one non-FIFA nationality.

| No. | Pos. | Nation | Player |
|---|---|---|---|
| 1 | GK | ENG | Luke Daniels (on loan from West Bromwich Albion) |
| 2 | DF | ENG | Shaleum Logan (on loan from Manchester City) |
| 3 | DF | ENG | Aaron Cresswell |
| 4 | MF | AUS | Gareth Edds |
| 5 | DF | JAM | Ian Goodison |
| 6 | MF | ENG | Paul McLaren |
| 7 | FW | ENG | Bas Savage |
| 8 | DF | ENG | Marlon Broomes |
| 9 | FW | ENG | Ian Thomas-Moore |
| 10 | MF | IRL | Alan Mahon |
| 11 | MF | ENG | John Welsh |
| 12 | DF | WAL | Ash Taylor (Note: Taylor was born in Bromborough, England, but also qualifies to represent Wales internationally and has represented them at U-19 and U-21 level.) |
| 13 | GK | ENG | Joe Collister |
| 14 | FW | ENG | Terry Gornell |

| No. | Pos. | Nation | Player |
|---|---|---|---|
| 15 | FW | GRN | Kithson Bain |
| 16 | FW | ENG | Josh Macauley |
| 17 | MF | ENG | Thomas Baker |
| 18 | DF | ENG | Chris McCready |
| 19 | MF | ENG | Charlie Barnett |
| 20 | MF | ENG | Ryan Fraughan |
| 21 | MF | ENG | Andy Robinson (on loan from Leeds United) |
| 22 | GK | ENG | Andy Coughlin |
| 23 | MF | ENG | Chris Shuker |
| 24 | DF | CIV | Zoumana Bakayogo (Note: Bakayogo was born in Paris, France, but also qualifies to represent the Ivory Coast internationally and has represented them at U-23 level.) |
| 25 | FW | ENG | Craig Curran |
| 29 | MF | ENG | Joss Labadie (on loan from West Bromwich Albion) |
| 30 | DF | ENG | Ben Gordon (on loan from Chelsea) |
| 31 | GK | HUN | Péter Gulácsi (on loan from Liverpool) |

=== Left club during season ===
Note: Flags indicate national team as defined under FIFA eligibility rules; some limited exceptions apply. Players may hold more than one non-FIFA nationality.

| No. | Pos. | Nation | Player |
|---|---|---|---|
| 15 | DF | IRL | Gavin Gunning (on loan from Blackburn Rovers) |
| 18 | FW | ENG | Michael Ricketts (released) |
| 21 | MF | FRA | Sébastien Carole (to Brighton & Hove Albion) |

| No. | Pos. | Nation | Player |
|---|---|---|---|
| 26 | GK | ENG | David Martin (on loan from Liverpool) |
| 27 | FW | ENG | Marvin Sordell (on loan from Watford) |
| 28 | DF | ENG | Luke O'Neill (on loan from Leicester City) |
