= Shane Cansdell-Sherriff =

Australian soccer player (born 1982)

Personal information
- Full name: Shane Lewis Cansdell-Sherriff
- Date of birth: 10 November 1982 (age 44)
- Place of birth: Sydney, Australia
- Height: 1.82 m (6 ft 0 in)
- Position: Centre-back

Youth career
- NSWIS

Senior career*
Years	Team	Apps	(Gls)
1999–2003	Leeds United	0	(0)
2002–2003	→ Rochdale (loan)	3	(0)
2003–2006	AGF Aarhus	82	(7)
2006–2008	Tranmere Rovers	87	(6)
2008–2012	Shrewsbury Town	150	(9)
2012–2014	Preston North End	15	(1)
2013	→ Rochdale (loan)	17	(0)
2013–2014	→ Burton Albion (loan)	32	(0)
2014–2016	Burton Albion	66	(2)
2016	Manly United	7	(1)
2017	Maitland FC	17	(1)
2018–2020	Adamstown Rosebud	12	(0)
2021	Bankstown City	8	(0)

International career
1999	Australia U17	16	(5)
2004	Australia U23		

Managerial career
- 2017–2020: Adamstown Rosebud
- 2021–2022: Bankstown City
Medal record
Men's football
Representing Australia
FIFA U-17 World Championship
Runner-up	1999 New Zealand	Team
- * Club domestic league appearances and goals as of 17 June 2021

Shane Lewis Cansdell-Sherriff (born 10 November 1982) is a former Australian professional football centre-back. He represented Australia at the 2004 Summer Olympics in Greece.

== Playing career ==
=== Beginnings ===
At 16, Sherriff caught the attention of Leeds United after the 1999 FIFA U-17 World Championship, where Australia finished runners-up. He spent three years at Elland Road, but only tasted first-team football on loan at Rochdale in 2002. Sherriff was released by Leeds during the club's financial crisis in 2003 and signed for Danish Superliga side AGF Aarhus. After three fairly impressive years in Denmark that won him a spot in the Australian squad for the Athens Olympics, Sherriff was signed by Tranmere Rovers at the start of the 2006–07 season. He made over 40 appearances in his debut season and even became club captain. During the 2007–08 season, injuries to the Rovers' first-choice wingers Steve Davies and Chris Shuker, as well as the arrival of Andy Taylor at left-back, saw Sherriff frequently appearing on the left side of midfield.

=== Shrewsbury Town ===
On 28 June 2008, Sherriff signed for Football League Two side Shrewsbury Town on a two-year contract and scored a 40-yard long shot on his debut, a 4–0 win over Macclesfield Town, on 9 August 2008. He established himself as a first-team regular and in June 2010 signed a new two-year contract. Sherriff was considered to have reached the peak of his career at Shrewsbury, becoming both the club's captain and longest-serving player with over 160 appearances in all competitions. On 16 March 2011, he earned a national call-up.

=== Preston and Burton ===
After suffering a shoulder injury during a 2–1 home win to Southend United on 21 January 2012, Sherriff indicated his desire to extend his contract again at Shrewsbury Town, but ultimately rejected it and left for Football League One side Preston North End on 16 May. On 25 September 2013, he moved down a division on loan to Burton Albion for three months and then terminated his deal with Preston in May 2014 to stay at Burton. Sherriff was released at the end of the 2015–16 season.

=== Return to Australia ===
On 13 July 2016, Sheriff came back to Australia, signing for Manly United FC in the National Premier Leagues NSW. He stated his ambition of easing into the coaching profession as the main reason of his joining, saying, "I will be working on my coaching experience where I can. I would like to go into management once I finish playing so while I continue to play I will continue to learn as a player and how various coaching ideas effect players."

In 2020, after a year-long break, Sherriff returned to playing for Adamstown Rosebud as player-coach.

== Coaching career ==
On 25 July 2017, Sherriff began his coaching career for Adamstown Rosebud, a position he held for three years until December 2020. In March 2021, he was appointed as head coach of Bankstown City FC.

== Career statistics ==
Appearances and goals by club, season and competition
Club	Season	League			National Cup		League Cup		Other		Total	
Club	Season	Division	Apps	Goals	Apps	Goals	Apps	Goals	Apps	Goals	Apps	Goals
Rochdale	2002–03	Third Division	3	0	1	0	0	0	0	0	4	0
AGF	2003–04	Danish Superliga	29	4	1	0	0	0	0	0	29	4
AGF	2004–05	Danish Superliga	26	2	3	0	0	0	0	0	28	2
AGF	2005–06	Danish Superliga	27	1	1	0	0	0	0	0	27	1
AGF	Total		82	7	5	0	0	0	0	0	87	7
Tranmere Rovers	2006–07	League One	43	3	2	1	1	1	2	0	48	5
Tranmere Rovers	2007–08	League One	44	3	4	0	1	0	0	0	49	3
Tranmere Rovers	Total		87	6	6	1	2	1	2	0	97	8
Shrewsbury Town	2008–09	League Two	31	2	0	0	1	0	3	1	35	3
Shrewsbury Town	2009–10	League Two	41	1	1	0	1	1	1	0	44	2
Shrewsbury Town	2010–11	League Two	41	2	1	0	1	0	1	0	44	2
Shrewsbury Town	2011–12	League Two	37	4	3	0	2	0	1	0	43	4
Shrewsbury Town	Total		150	9	5	0	5	1	6	1	166	11
Preston North End	2012–13	League One	15	1	3	0	2	0	2	0	22	1
Rochdale	2012–13	League Two	17	0	0	0	0	0	0	0	17	0
Burton Albion	2013–14	League Two	32	0	1	0	0	0	2	0	34	0
Burton Albion	2014–15	League Two	37	2	1	0	2	0	1	0	41	2
Burton Albion	2015–16	League One	29	0	0	0	2	0	0	0	31	0
Burton Albion	Total		98	2	2	0	4	0	3	0	107	2
Manly United	2016	NPL NSW	7	1	0	0	0	0	0	0	7	1
Maitland	2017	NPL NNSW	17	1	3	1	0	0	0	0	20	2
Adamstown Rosebud	2018	NPL NNSW	6	0	0	0	0	0	0	0	6	0
Adamstown Rosebud	2020	NPL NNSW	6	0	0	0	0	0	0	0	6	0
Adamstown Rosebud	Total		12	0	0	0	0	0	0	0	12	0
Bankstown City	2021	NPL NSW 3	8	0	0	0	0	0	0	0	8	0
Career total			496	27	27	2	13	2	13	1	549	32

== Honours ==
Shrewsbury Town

- Football League Two runner-up: 2011–12

Burton Albion

- Football League One runner-up: 2015–16
- Football League Two: 2014–15

Australia U17

- FIFA U-17 World Championship runner-up: 1999
