= Ian Goodison =

Jamaican footballer (born 1972)

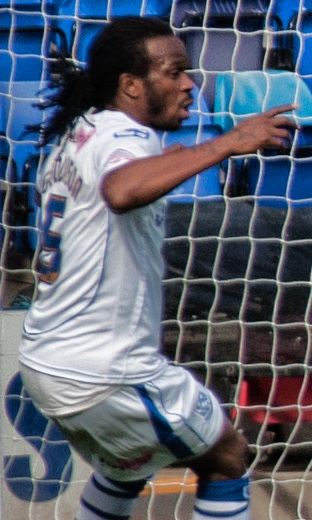
- Goodison with Tranmere Rovers in 2011

Personal information
- Full name: Ian De Souza Goodison
- Date of birth: 21 November 1972 (age 53)
- Place of birth: Montego Bay, Jamaica
- Height: 6 ft 3 in (1.91 m)
- Position: Defender

Senior career*
Years	Team	Apps	(Gls)
1996–1999	Olympic Gardens		
1999–2002	Hull City	70	(1)
2002–2004	Seba United		
2004–2014	Tranmere Rovers	364	(11)
2015–2016	Harbour View		

International career
1996–2009	Jamaica	128	(10)
- * Club domestic league appearances and goals

Ian De Souza Goodison (born 21 November 1972) is a Jamaican former professional footballer who played as a defender. He spent most of his career at English side Tranmere Rovers.

== Club career ==
=== Early career ===
Born in Montego Bay, Saint James, Goodison began his career in minor Jamaican football leagues and was discovered in 1996 by René Simões who introduced him straight into the national squad. He joined Olympic Gardens in 1997, sharing his playing time at the club with a Cayman Islands-based team before making his first foray into English football via Third Division side Hull City, when he was signed along with fellow countryman and good friend Theo Whitmore by Brian Little. The Jamaican impressed during his time at Hull, epitomised by the fact that he was their Player of the Season for the 2000–01 season (his first in English football). He scored his first and only goal for the club in a 2–1 win over Carlisle United. Despite his impressive start Little's departure as manager was followed by that of Goodison who returned to Jamaica to play for Seba United.

=== Tranmere Rovers ===
Goodison joined Tranmere in February 2004 under Brian Little and played in the heart of the defence. The former Jamaican international played more than 350 times for the club, and was named supporters' Player of the Season three times, and the North West League One Footballer of the Year award also three times. He played in the Tranmere team which reached the quarter final of the FA Cup in his first season, whilst with his second season at the club Tranmere finished third in League One and entered the end of season play-offs. At the end of the 2011–12 season he signed a one-year contract extension which kept him at the club beyond his 40th birthday. He was the first player ever to play for Tranmere while in his forties.

In May 2013, Goodison signed another year extension to his contract, keeping him at the club until the summer of 2014. The deal included an option for a testimonial at Prenton Park. On 27 August 2013, he played 120 minutes against Bolton Wanderers in the League Cup; his performance was praised by fans and he was labelled as the 'best player on the park' by manager Ronnie Moore. On 13 October 2013, Goodison made his 400th appearance for Tranmere and captained them to a 1–0 win against Bradford City.

On 9 December 2013, it was reported that he had been arrested as part of a police investigation into match fixing, however the charges were later dropped. In May 2015, a testimonial for Goodison was held at Prenton Park. A team of ex-Tranmere teammates, including Enoch Showunmi, Eugene Dadi, Owain Fon Williams, and Ryan Lowe, faced an International XI, composed of ex-Jamaica teammates such as Ricardo Fuller, Darren Byfield, and Ricardo Gardner and other notable international players, such as ex-Tranmere teammate John Achterberg and Fabrice Muamba, who has not played professionally since suffering a cardiac arrest whilst playing for Bolton. Brian Little and Ronnie Moore managed the two sides, with Mike Dean acting as referee.

== International career ==
Goodison made his debut for the Jamaica national team in a March 1996 friendly match against Guatemala and immediately scored his first international goal. Goodison was included in the 23-man squad named by Jamaica manager Theo Whitmore for the 2011 Gold Cup in the United States, though he was later dropped after failing to report for pre-tournament training in Brazil. As of May 2009, he has collected a country all-time record of 120 caps and scored 10 goals. 45 of those games were in FIFA World Cup qualification and in the 1998 tournament.

== Career statistics ==
=== Club ===
Appearances and goals by club, season and competition
Club	Season	League			FA Cup		League Cup		Other		Total	
Club	Season	Division	Apps	Goals	Apps	Goals	Apps	Goals	Apps	Goals	Apps	Goals
Hull City	1999–2000	Third Division	18	0	4	0	0	0	1 (Note: Appearance(s) in Football League Trophy)	0	23	0
Hull City	2000–01	Third Division	36	1	1	0	1	0	2 (Note: One appearance in Football League Trophy, one appearance in Third Division play-offs)	0	40	1
Hull City	2001–02	Third Division	16	0	2	0	1	0	2	0	21	0
Hull City	Total		70	1	7	0	2	0	5	0	84	1
Tranmere Rovers	2003–04	Second Division	12	0	2	0	0	0	0	0	14	0
Tranmere Rovers	2004–05	League One	44	1	1	0	1	0	5 (Note: Three appearances in Football League Trophy, two appearances in League One play-offs)	0	51	1
Tranmere Rovers	2005–06	League One	38	1	0	0	1	0	2	0	41	1
Tranmere Rovers	2006–07	League One	40	0	2	0	1	0	2	0	45	0
Tranmere Rovers	2007–08	League One	42	0	2	0	1	0	1	0	46	0
Tranmere Rovers	2008–09	League One	33	1	2	0	0	0	2	0	37	1
Tranmere Rovers	2009–10	League One	44	3	5	0	2	0	1	0	52	3
Tranmere Rovers	2010–11	League One	40	4	1	1	2	1	3	0	46	6
Tranmere Rovers	2011–12	League One	43	1	1	0	1	0	1	0	46	1
Tranmere Rovers	2012–13	League One	10	0	2	0	0	0	0	0	12	0
Tranmere Rovers	2013–14	League One	18	0	0	0	1	0	1	0	20	0
Tranmere Rovers	Total		364	11	18	1	10	1	18	0	410	13
Career total			434	12	25	1	12	1	23	0	494	14

=== International ===
Appearances and goals by national team and year
National team	Year	Apps	Goals
Jamaica	1996	13	2
Jamaica	1997	18	1
Jamaica	1998	21	4
Jamaica	1999	15	0
Jamaica	2000	15	0
Jamaica	2001	9	0
Jamaica	2002	8	1
Jamaica	2003	4	0
Jamaica	2004	11	1
Jamaica	2007	1	0
Jamaica	2008	12	1
Jamaica	2009	1	0
Total		128	10

Jamaica score listed first, score column indicates score after each Goodison goal.

International goals by date, venue, cap, opponent, score, result and competition
No.	Date	Venue	Cap	Opponent	Score	Result	Competition	Ref
1	3 March 1996	Independence Park, Kingston, Jamaica	1	Guatemala	1–0	2–0	Friendly	
2	17 November 1996	Independence Park, Kingston, Jamaica	13	Mexico	1–0	1–0	1998 FIFA World Cup qualification	
3	24 October 1997	Mindoo Phillip Park, Castries, Saint Lucia	29	Saint Lucia	1–0	3–1	Friendly	
4	22 February 1998	Independence Park, Kingston, Jamaica	38	Nigeria	1–1	2–2	Friendly	
5	22 July 1998	Independence Park, Kingston, Jamaica	48	Cayman Islands	1–0	4–0	1998 Caribbean Cup	
6	24 July 1998	Independence Park, Kingston, Jamaica	49	Netherlands Antilles	2–1	3–2	1998 Caribbean Cup	
7	26 July 1998	Independence Park, Kingston, Jamaica	50	Haiti	1–0	2–1	1998 Caribbean Cup	
8	29 August 2002	Vicarage Road, Watford, England	92	India	3–0	3–0	Friendly	
9	18 August 2004	Independence Park, Kingston, Jamaica	110	United States	1–0	1–1	2006 FIFA World Cup qualification	
10	15 June 2008	Independence Park, Kingston, Jamaica	120	Bahamas	6–0	7–0	2010 FIFA World Cup qualification	

== Honours ==
Jamaica

- Caribbean Cup: 1998

== See also ==
- List of men's footballers with 100 or more international caps
