= Steve Davies (footballer, born 1987) =

English footballer (born 1987)

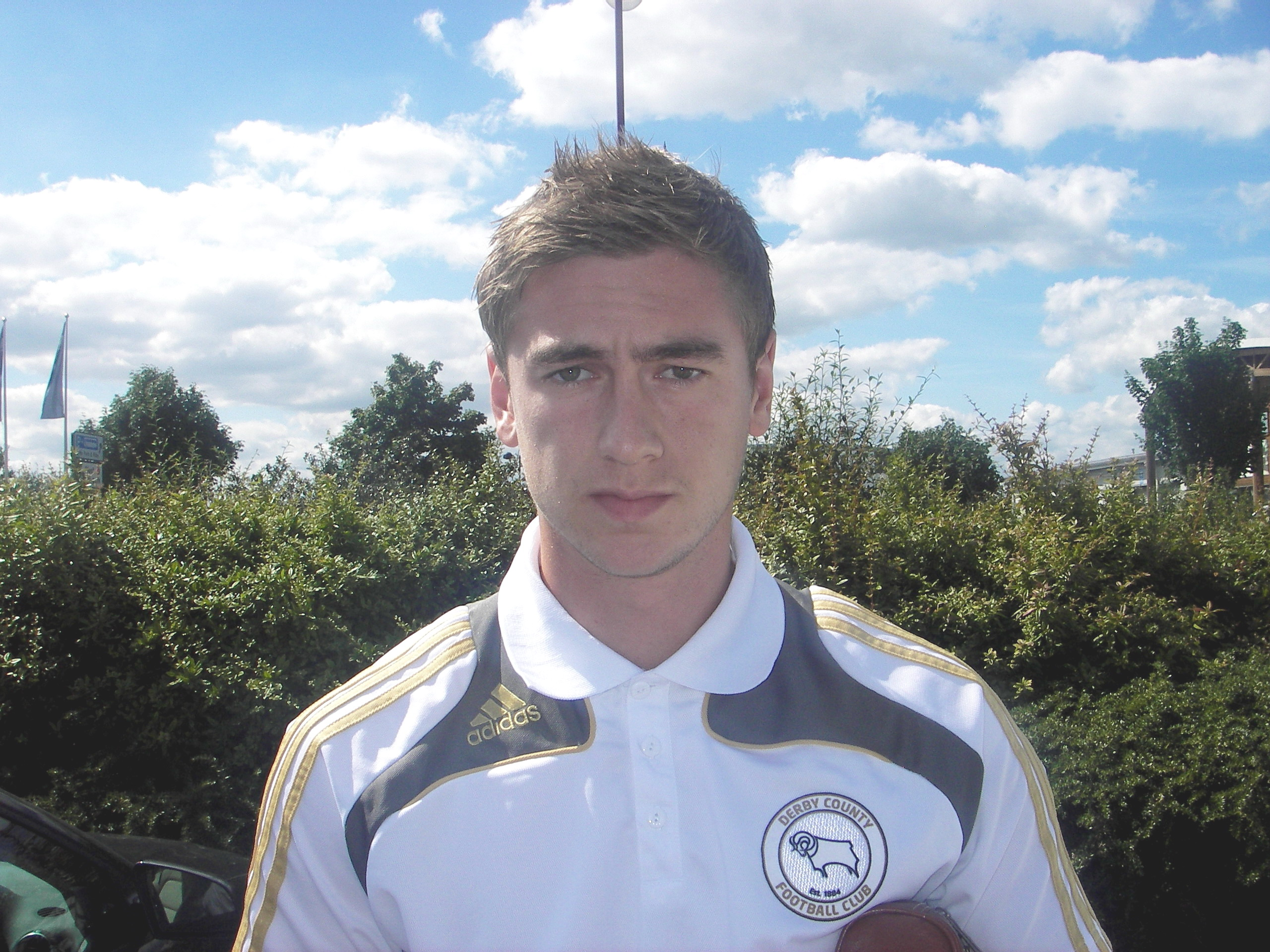
- Davies in 2008

Personal information
- Full name: Steven Gary Davies
- Date of birth: 29 December 1987 (age 38)
- Place of birth: Liverpool, England
- Height: 6 ft 1 in (1.85 m)
- Position: Striker

Team information
- Current team: Runcorn Town

Youth career
- –2005: Tranmere Rovers

Senior career*
Years	Team	Apps	(Gls)
2005–2008	Tranmere Rovers	60	(5)
2008–2012	Derby County	83	(21)
2012–2013	Bristol City	37	(13)
2013–2015	Blackpool	45	(8)
2015	→ Sheffield United (loan)	13	(2)
2015–2016	Bradford City	25	(5)
2016–2018	Rochdale	61	(16)
2018–2019	Blackpool	2	(0)
2019–2020	Hamilton Academical	22	(4)
2021–	Runcorn Town		
- * Club domestic league appearances and goals as of 11:41, 3 June 2020 (UTC)

Steven Gary Davies (born 29 December 1987) is an English professional footballer who plays as a striker for Runcorn Town.

== Career ==
=== Tranmere Rovers ===
Born in Liverpool, Merseyside, Davies came through the youth ranks at Tranmere Rovers, making his first team debut at the age of 17 on 12 August 2005 in a 4–0 victory against Oldham Athletic. He went on to make another 25 appearances in all competitions (the majority as a substitute) during the 2005–06 season, scoring twice.

Though initially established as a striker, lack of starting opportunities due to the form of Chris Greenacre saw him switch to the left wing from which he scored his first goal of the 2006–07 season in Tranmere's victory over Blackpool. Davies played on the wing and made 33 appearances, scoring once.

Following an impressive performance against them on the opening day of the 2007–08 season, Leeds United unsuccessfully attempted to sign the winger on three separate occasions, though a statement on the Tranmere website on 29 August 2007 saw manager Ronnie Moore refuse to rule out that a deal might eventually be made, though nothing eventually came of Leeds interest. Davies was involved in all 10 of Tranmere's opening fixtures but missed the majority of the rest of the campaign through injury, only returning to the side in April 2008 for the 2–0 home defeat against Forest. Davies finished the season with 12 appearances and two goals.

Davies contract with Tranmere expired at the close of the 2007–08 season and he attracted the interest of Championship side Derby, with Rams manager Paul Jewell willing to go to a tribunal to secure his services.

=== Derby County ===
Davies signed a three-year deal with newly relegated Derby on 12 June 2008. As the two clubs could not agree a fee for Davies, on 26 August 2008 a tribunal ordered Derby to pay Tranmere up to £725,000 in compensation. This figure comprised an initial fee of £275,000, an extra £250,000 based on appearances and an additional £200,000 if Derby won promotion back to the Premiership within 3 years, which they ultimately did not.

Davies scored his first goal for Derby County on 16 July 2008 in a pre-season friendly against Burton Albion, taking on 3 players before driving it into the bottom corner with his right foot. He made his competitive first team debut against Doncaster Rovers on 9 August 2008 replacing Andrejs Perepļotkins in the 64th minute, before making his first start against Lincoln City on 12 August 2008 in the 3–1 League Cup victory. He scored his first goal against Birmingham City on 30 September 2008, equalising in the closing minutes by getting on the end of a Nacer Barazite free kick to earn a 1–1 draw. He scored the winning goal in the F.A. Cup tie against Forest Green Rovers from the penalty spot to seal a 4–3 win before again scoring from the penalty spot against local rivals Nottingham Forest in a game which Derby won 3–1. Davies' fourth goal for the club came in the 84th minute away at Southampton where he salvaged a 1–1 draw for the Rams. At the end of March 2009, he suffered a hairline fracture of the fifth metatarsal in his right foot and was ruled out for the rest of the season.

Davies enjoyed a successful 2009–10 preseason for Derby, scoring four goals in as many games, prompting manager Nigel Clough to challenge to maintain the form and claim a first team spot heading into the new season. Despite starting in the first team, a succession of injuries meant that Davies only played in two matches between the end of August 2009 and January 2010. After returning to the side in a 1–1 draw away to Millwall in the FA Cup third round on 2 January 2010, Davies embarked on a run of five consecutive appearances, though four were as substitute, his best run of matches since March 2009, and netted twice – the equaliser in the Third Round replay against Millwall and a penalty in a 3–0 win at Peterborough United. Following this run, however, his fitness problems returned and he made four starts in the next seventeen fixtures and, after a late substitute appearance against Crystal Palace in the penultimate home fixture of the campaign, the club announced Davies was to undergo ankle surgery which ruled him out until 1 June. Davies finished the season with just 8 starts and 13 substitute appearances from Derby's 51 league and cup game programme, scoring twice.

Clough stated his intent to improve Davies conditioning for the 2010–11 season, stating "He will be back in training on 1 June, four weeks before everybody else." Davies subsequently damaged his cruciate ligaments in pre-season training and was ruled out for a further six months. Davies returned to the side in the final game of 2010, making a substitute appearance in a 5–2 defeat at Nottingham Forest. Two months later, Davies signed a one-year contract extension which kept him at the club until the summer of 2012. He scored his third goal of the season as Derby beat Swansea 2–1 on 12 March 2011. Davies finished the season off with 5 league goals, the joint second top scorer with Alberto Bueno & Jamie Ward, with the three being behind leading scorer Kris Commons who netted 13 times.

After a full pre-season schedule, Davies started in Derby's starting line-up and netted five times in his first eight league games, including the winner over Birmingham City and Watford as Derby found themselves in the top four for the majority of the opening 12 games of the season. Davies was displaying his best form in his three years at Derby before an innocuous-looking clash of heads in the 1–1 home draw with league leaders Southampton left Davies ruled out for 12 weeks after it left him with 10 metal plates in his skull. The injury meant that Davies had had six operations in his three years at Pride Park, following treatment for a fractured eye-socket and cheekbone, cruciate ligament damage in his knee, an ankle problem, a broken foot, hamstring, groin and hernia problems, and an infected big toe. It meant Davies had played a role in just 78 of Derby's 169 games (46%) on 21 October 2011 during his time at the club, despite being considered a first-team player by most commentators.

Davies featured in several reserve matches wearing a protective mask and made his first team return as a half-time substitute in a 1–0 defeat against Reading on 14 February 2012, after this game Davies declared himself fit to start for the first team. Davies made two further substitute appearance before he was named in the starting line-up in the game against Birmingham City 3 March, Davies scored his first goal since his return and his 6th of the season. On 6 March 2012, Davies scored both of Derby's goals in the 2–1 against Blackpool, Davies earned praise from both Derby coach Andy Garner and Blackpool mananager Ian Holloway for his performance in the game, with Davies' family thanking Holloway for his comments with an e-mail. Davies has scored further goals a loss against Watford and wins against Crystal Palace, at Leeds United and a penalty at Portsmouth. Davies finished the season as the club's top league scorer with 12 goals, Theo Robinson also scored 12 times in all competition but only 10 times in the league.

Davies had an option activated by the club to extend his contract until the summer of 2013, however, Davies was transfer listed by the club on 22 May 2012 after he turned down a new three-year contract by the club. Derby manager Nigel Clough said that Davies turned down the offer due to "family reasons" and fully respected his decision. In July 2012, it was reported the Ipswich Town were interested in Davies. Former Derby manager Paul Jewell keen to reunite with the player, however the two clubs were "a long way apart" in agreeing on a fee for Davies with Jewell valuing the player at £500,000 and Clough at £1 million. The clubs remained in talks to agree a fee. In August 2012, it was reported that the transfer was on the verge of collapse. Davies played his first game in Derby's pre-season campaign against Chesterfield on 11 August 2012, scoring in stoppage time in the 3–1 defeat. On 20 August 2012, it was reported that Derby and Bristol City had agreed on a transfer fee for Davies.

=== Bristol City ===
On 20 August 2012, Davies signed for Bristol City on a 3-year contract for £750,000, despite interest from divisional rivals Ipswich Town. He made his debut on 21 August, in a 4–1 win against Crystal Palace. On 22 September he scored his first goal for the club, earning his side a 2–2 draw against Watford. He scored again in the following game, this time in a 1–1 draw at home to Millwall on 2 October. On 20 October he scored twice in a 3–2 defeat to Bolton Wanderers. He scored again the following game, a 4–3 loss to Burnley and continued his scoring run in the following game, scoring for the third game in a row in a 2–1 loss against Hull City. In November he scored in back-to-back games, scoring a penalty in a 1–1 draw against Blackpool, and completing the scoring in a 3–1 win away to Middlesbrough. On 26 January 2013, Davies scored 1 goal and set up the winning goal as Bristol City beat Ipswich Town 2–1 at Ashton Gate. He scored his tenth goal for the club on 9 February, in a 2–0 win at home to Nottingham Forest.

=== Blackpool ===
On 27 July 2013, Blackpool announced the signing of Davies from Bristol City on a two-year contract, for a fee believed to be £500,000. Davies joined Sheffield United until the end of the 2014–15 season on 6 March 2015.

=== Bradford City ===
After his contract at Blackpool expired, Davies joined Bradford City on 30 June 2015 on a one-year contract.

=== Rochdale ===
On 17 August 2016, Davies signed for a one-year contract with Rochdale. On 18 February 2018, he scored an injury time equalizing goal against Tottenham Hotspur during a 2–2 draw, earning Rochdale a replay at Wembley in the 5th round of the FA Cup. He was released by Rochdale at the end of the 2017–18 season.

=== Blackpool ===
Davies rejoined Blackpool on a short-term contract until 12 January 2019 in October 2018.

=== Hamilton Academical ===
He moved to Scottish club Hamilton Academical in January 2019 on a short-term contract. He signed a new one-year contract with the club in June 2019.

=== Runcorn Town ===
In December 2021 he signed for Runcorn Town.

== Career statistics ==
As of match played 15 February 2020

Appearances and goals by club, season and competition
Club	Season	League			FA Cup		League Cup		Other		Total	
Club	Season	Division	Apps	Goals	Apps	Goals	Apps	Goals	Apps	Goals	Apps	Goals
Tranmere Rovers	2005–06	League One	22	2	1	0	1	0	2 (Note: Appearances in the Football League Trophy)	0	26	2
Tranmere Rovers	2006–07	League One	28	1	2	0	1	0	2	0	33	1
Tranmere Rovers	2007–08	League One	10	2	0	0	1	0	1	0	12	2
Tranmere Rovers	Total		60	5	3	0	3	0	5	0	71	5
Derby County	2008–09	Championship	19	3	1	1	4	0	—		24	4
Derby County	2009–10	Championship	18	1	3	1	1	0	—		22	2
Derby County	2010–11	Championship	20	5	1	0	0	0	—		21	5
Derby County	2011–12	Championship	26	12	0	0	1	0	—		27	12
Derby County	Total		83	21	5	2	6	0	0	0	94	23
Bristol City	2012–13	Championship	37	13	1	0	0	0	—		38	13
Blackpool	2013–14	Championship	28	3	0	0	1	0	—		29	3
Blackpool	2014–15	Championship	17	5	1	0	0	0	—		18	5
Blackpool	Total		45	8	1	0	1	0	0	0	47	8
Sheffield United (loan)	2014–15	League One	13	2	0	0	0	0	2 (Note: Two appearances and one goal in the League One play-offs)	1	15	3
Bradford City	2015–16	League One	25	5	1	0	1	0	2 (Note: One appearance in the Football League Trophy, two appearances in the League One play-offs)	0	29	5
Rochdale	2016–17	League One	29	9	4	3	1	0	3	1	37	13
Rochdale	2017–18	League One	32	7	2	1	2	0	0	0	36	8
Rochdale	Total		61	16	6	4	3	0	3	1	73	21
Blackpool	2018–19	League One	2	0	1	0	0	0	2	1	5	1
Hamilton Academical	2018–19	Scottish Premiership	9	2	1	0	0	0	—		10	2
Hamilton Academical	2019–20	Scottish Premiership	13	2	1	0	1	0	—		15	2
Hamilton Academical	Total		22	4	2	0	1	0	0	0	25	4
Career total			348	74	20	6	15	0	14	3	397	83
