= Steve Jennings (footballer) =

English footballer (born 1984)

Personal information
- Full name: Steven John Jennings
- Date of birth: 28 October 1984 (age 42)
- Place of birth: Liverpool, England
- Height: 5 ft 7 in (1.70 m)
- Position: Central midfielder

Youth career
- 1993–1998: Everton
- 1998–2002: Tranmere Rovers

Senior career*
Years	Team	Apps	(Gls)
2002–2009	Tranmere Rovers	140	(6)
2007	→ Hereford United (loan)	11	(0)
2009–2012	Motherwell	93	(2)
2012–2013	Coventry City	39	(0)
2013–2014	Tranmere Rovers	25	(1)
2014–2015	Port Vale	4	(0)
2014	→ Tranmere Rovers (loan)	8	(1)
2015–2017	Tranmere Rovers	79	(3)
2017–2018	Southport	12	(1)
2017–2018	→ Warrington Town (loan)	19	(3)
2018–2019	Barrow	14	(0)
2019–2020	Warrington Town	10	(0)
Total		454	(17)
- * Club domestic league appearances and goals

Steven John Jennings (born 28 October 1984) is an English former professional footballer who played as a central midfielder in the English Football League, Scottish Premier League and in English non-League football.

Jennings turned professional at Tranmere Rovers in October 2002 and made his first-team debut 12 months later. He remained with Tranmere for six seasons, also playing on loan at Hereford United in the latter half of the 2006–07 season. He signed with Scottish Premier League club Motherwell in July 2009. He spent three seasons in Scotland, featuring on the losing side in the 2011 final of the Scottish Cup. He then spent one season each at Coventry City and Tranmere Rovers before joining Port Vale in July 2014. He returned to Tranmere on loan later in the year before joining the club permanently in January 2015. He switched to Southport in June 2017 and was loaned out to Warrington Town in November 2017. He joined Barrow in August 2018 before returning to Warrington Town the following year.

== Career ==
=== Tranmere Rovers ===
Jennings was taken out of the Everton Academy by his father and instead joined the Tranmere Rovers Centre of Excellence in 1998. He was a key part of the Rovers youth team that reached the FA Youth Cup semi-finals in 2003. He signed a three-and-a-half-year professional contract with the club in October 2002. He made his first-team debut on 18 October 2003, coming on as a last minute substitute for Iain Hume in a 2–1 win over Oldham Athletic at Prenton Park. He made his first start on 13 December, in a 2–2 draw at Chesterfield. He played a total of four Second Division games during the 2003–04 campaign, and featured in 11 League One games during the 2004–05 season.

Jennings established himself in the Rovers first-team under Brian Little's stewardship in the 2005–06 campaign, featuring 43 times and scoring two goals. He scored his first senior goal on 18 October in a 2–1 Football League Trophy victory over Lincoln City. He scored his first league goal 11 days later, in a 2–0 victory at Doncaster Rovers. He signed a new two-year contract in April 2006. Having been limited to only five appearances in the first half of the 2006–07 season under new boss Ronnie Moore, Jennings joined Graham Turner's Hereford United on loan in January 2007. He impressed at Edgar Street, which led to his loan being extended to the end of the 2006–07 season, and he played a total of 11 League Two games for the "Bulls".

Jennings re-established his place at Tranmere during the 2007–08 season, appearing in all but five league matches, usually partnering Paul McLaren in the centre of midfield. He had an excellent season, winning praise for his high work rate and willingness to make challenges. He won the Players' Young Player of the Season award at the end of the season. He was voted Tranmere Player's Player of the Year at the end of the 2008–09 after missing only two league games due to suspension.

=== Motherwell ===
In July 2009, he became Jim Gannon's first signing as Motherwell manager when he joined the club on a one-year deal. He made his Scottish Premier League debut for the "Steelmen" at Fir Park on 22 August, in a 3–1 win over Kilmarnock. He scored his first goal for Motherwell in a 3–1 loss to St Johnstone on 26 December. He signed a new one-year contract in May 2010, leaving manager Craig Brown to say that the deal was a "massive boost" for the club and that "he's an excellent midfield player who has been at the heart of everything we did in the second half of the season".

The Association of British Bookmakers investigated "suspicious betting patterns" on a red card being shown to Jennings for dissent during a game in December 2010. Jennings was arrested, along with eight other men, on suspicion of conspiracy to defraud in October 2011. A week later, his club confirmed that he would continue to be available for first-team selection. Merseyside Police advised Jennings in April 2012 that their inquiries had ceased and that no further action would be taken. His solicitor said that Jennings felt vindicated in believing that there had been no criminal activity. After the police ended their investigation, Motherwell manager Stuart McCall criticised unnamed Scottish football officials who had suggested that Jennings should have been suspended while under suspicion.

He made 43 appearances in the 2010–11 campaign, including the Scottish Cup final defeat to Celtic at Hampden Park. He signed a one-year contract extension with Motherwell in July 2011. He played 37 games in the 2011–12 season, helping the club to qualify for the UEFA Champions League.

=== Coventry City ===
In August 2012, Jennings signed a two-year contract with Mark Robins's League One side Coventry City. He played 49 games in the 2012–13 campaign, with only two players playing more games for the "Sky Blues" that season. Despite this, he was judged to be surplus to requirements at the Ricoh Arena by new boss Steven Pressley, and his contract was terminated by mutual consent in September 2013.

=== Return to Tranmere Rovers ===
In October 2013, Jennings returned to Tranmere Rovers, still in League One and managed by Ronnie Moore, on non-contract terms. He impressed at Prenton Park and his short-term stay was extended into the summer. The club were relegated into League Two at the end of the 2013–14 season.

In July 2014, Jennings signed a one-year deal at League One club Port Vale, following a short period on trial. On 27 October 2014, after only six appearances for the "Valiants", Jennings returned to Tranmere Rovers for a third spell, signing on loan until January 2015; in doing so he was also reunited with manager Micky Adams, who had signed him for Port Vale three months earlier. He made a scoring start to his third spell at Prenton Park, netting from long range in a 2–2 draw with Stevenage on 1 November. He left Vale Park by mutual consent in January 2015, and signed a permanent contract with Tranmere. He ended the 2014–15 season with 36 appearances to his name, as Rovers were relegated out of the English Football League.

He signed a new one-year contract in May 2015, stating that "I want to make right the wrongs of the last couple of seasons". He was later appointed as club captain. He scored two goals in 45 appearances in the 2015–16 season, as Tranmere finished one place and two points outside the play-off zone. He signed a new one-year contract in May 2016. He played 20 games across the 2016–17 campaign after overcoming a knee injury which required surgery.

=== Later career ===
Jennings signed with National League North club Southport in June 2017, and was described as a "massive coup" for the "Sandgrounders" by manager Alan Lewer. On 3 November 2017, he joined Northern Premier League Premier Division side Warrington Town on a two-month loan deal; "Yellows" manager Paul Carden said that "Jenno is a player I know well and the opportunity to sign him was too good to turn down". After settling in well at Warrington he said he was "more than happy" to extend his loan deal. He helped Warrington to a third-place finish at the end of the 2017–18 season, which qualified them for the play-off semi-finals, where they were beaten 3–0 by Grantham Town.

On 14 August 2018, Jennings signed with National League side Barrow. He made his debut later that day, and was sent off in a 3–2 win over Chesterfield at Holker Street. He featured a total of 14 times for the "Bluebirds" throughout the 2018–19 campaign. In August 2019, he rejoined Warrington Town and played ten league games before retiring from football in January 2020.

== Style of play ==
Speaking in February 2014, Tranmere Rovers coach John McMahon labelled Jennings a "fire blanket" for his ability to break up opposition play across the pitch.

== Personal life ==
In September 2022, Jennings and Alan Rogers stood trial for allegedly blackmailing an unnamed football manager over gambling debts of nearly £1million. The case was dropped after the manager, who the court had granted anonymity, declined to give evidence.

== Career statistics ==
Appearances and goals by club, season and competition
Club	Season	League			FA Cup		League Cup		Other^{[A]}		Total	
Club	Season	Division	Apps	Goals	Apps	Goals	Apps	Goals	Apps	Goals	Apps	Goals
Tranmere Rovers	2003–04	Second Division	4	0	1	0	0	0	0	0	5	0
Tranmere Rovers	2004–05	League One	11	0	0	0	1	0	2	0	14	0
Tranmere Rovers	2005–06	League One	38	1	1	0	1	0	3	1	43	2
Tranmere Rovers	2006–07	League One	2	0	0	0	1	0	2	1	5	1
Tranmere Rovers	2007–08	League One	41	2	4	2	1	0	1	0	47	4
Tranmere Rovers	2008–09	League One	44	3	4	0	1	0	4	0	53	3
Tranmere Rovers	Total		140	6	10	2	5	0	12	2	167	10
Hereford United (loan)	2006–07	League Two	11	0	—		—		—		11	0
Motherwell	2009–10	Scottish Premier League	29	2	0	0	1	0	3	0	33	2
Motherwell	2010–11	Scottish Premier League	30	0	5	1	3	0	5	0	43	1
Motherwell	2011–12	Scottish Premier League	34	0	2	0	1	0	0	0	37	0
Motherwell	Total		93	2	7	1	5	0	8	0	113	3
Coventry City	2012–13	League One	39	0	3	1	1	0	6	1	49	2
Tranmere Rovers	2013–14	League One	25	1	0	0	—		—		25	1
Port Vale	2014–15	League One	4	0	0	0	2	0	0	0	6	0
Tranmere Rovers	2014–15	League Two	30	1	4	0	—		2	0	36	1
Tranmere Rovers	2015–16	National League	42	2	2	0	—		1	0	45	2
Tranmere Rovers	2016–17	National League	15	1	1	0	—		4	0	20	1
Tranmere Rovers	Total		87	4	7	0	0	0	7	0	101	4
Warrington Town	2017–18	Northern Premier League; Premier Division	19	3	0	0	1	0	5	0	25	3
Southport	2017–18	National League North	12	1	0	0	—		0	0	12	1
Southport	2018–19	National League North	0	0	0	0	—		0	0	0	0
Southport	Total		12	1	0	0	0	0	0	0	12	1
Barrow	2018–19	National League	14	0	0	0	—		0	0	14	0
Barrow	2019–20	National League	0	0	0	0	—		0	0	0	0
Barrow	Total		14	0	0	0	0	0	0	0	14	0
Warrington Town	2019–20	Northern Premier League; Premier Division	10	0	1	0	0	0	0	0	11	0
Career total			454	17	28	4	14	0	38	3	534	24

A. The "Other" column constitutes appearances and goals (including substitutes) in the UEFA Europa League, FA Trophy, Football League Trophy, and play-offs.

== Honours ==
Motherwell

- Scottish Cup runner-up: 2011
