= Chris Shuker =

English footballer (born 1982)

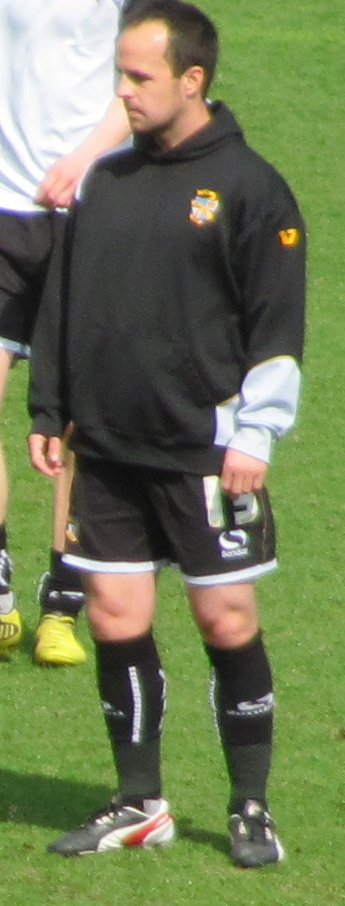
- Shuker warming up for Port Vale in 2013

Personal information
- Full name: Christopher Alan Shuker
- Date of birth: 9 May 1982 (age 44)
- Place of birth: Huyton, Liverpool, England
- Height: 5 ft 5 in (1.65 m)
- Position: Midfielder

Youth career
- Everton
- 1999–2000: Manchester City

Senior career*
Years	Team	Apps	(Gls)
2000–2004	Manchester City	5	(0)
2001	→ Macclesfield Town (loan)	8	(1)
2003	→ Walsall (loan)	5	(0)
2003	→ Rochdale (loan)	14	(1)
2003–2004	→ Hartlepool United (loan)	14	(1)
2004–2006	Barnsley	100	(17)
2006–2010	Tranmere Rovers	123	(14)
2010–2011	Morecambe	27	(2)
2012–2014	Port Vale	55	(1)
2014–2015	Tranmere Rovers	3	(0)
Total		354	(37)
- * Club domestic league appearances and goals

Christopher Alan Shuker (born 9 May 1982) is an English football coach and former player who made 402 appearances in a 14-year career as a midfielder in the English Football League.

He began his career at Manchester City, making his Premier League debut in 2002. He enjoyed loan spells out at Macclesfield Town, Walsall, Rochdale, and Hartlepool United, before signing a contract with Barnsley in March 2004. A key player at the club, he helped the "Tykes" to promotion out of the League One play-offs in 2006. He left the club after Barnsley withdrew their contract offer, and subsequently signed with Tranmere Rovers. He played 144 games for Rovers in league and cup competitions before transferring to Morecambe for the 2010–11 season. He joined Port Vale on non-contract terms in February 2012 and helped the club to secure promotion out of League Two in 2012–13. He retired in May 2014 due to a chronic knee injury but, having rejoined Tranmere Rovers as a coach in October 2014, returned to playing two months later.

== Career ==
=== Manchester City ===
A right-sided midfielder from Huyton, Liverpool, Shuker left the Everton academy at age 16 to begin his career in the Premier League with Manchester City, signing professional forms at the age of 17. He was loaned out to Third Division club Macclesfield Town in March 2001, where he made his competitive debut under Gil Prescott on 24 March, in a 2–1 win over Blackpool at Moss Rose, after replacing Richard Tracey on 79 minutes. Prescott handed Shuker first start seven days later, in a 1–0 defeat at Carlisle United. He scored his first senior goal in his third appearance for the club, his header was the only goal of a 1–0 home win, and "capped off a fine all-round performance" against Kidderminster Harriers. He returned to Maine Road at the end of the 2000–01 season having made eight appearances for Macclesfield; during his absence Manchester City had lost their top-flight status.

He marked his "Blues" debut with a goal five minutes after coming onto the pitch, as Kevin Keegan put him on for Eyal Berkovic 59 minutes into a 4–2 win over Notts County in the League Cup on 11 September 2001. He played cameo roles in 3–0 wins over Walsall and Barnsley, but played a total of just three games in 2001–02, as City won promotion out of the First Division. He signed a new one-year deal in January, along with fellow youth team graduate Joey Barton.

After scoring past Rochdale and Tranmere Rovers in pre-season friendlies, he was given his Premier League debut on the opening day of the 2002–03 season, as City were beaten 3–0 by Leeds United at Elland Road. He got his first start for the club on 15 September, as City drew 2–2 at home to Blackburn Rovers; he was taken off for Danny Tiatto on 61 minutes. He made his final appearance for the club 13 days later, as Michael Owen scored a hat-trick in 3–0 home defeat to Liverpool. He was sent out on a one-month loan to Colin Lee's Walsall in March 2003, and played five First Division games for the "Saddlers" before returning to Manchester. He signed a new one-year contract despite raising concerns over a lack of first-team opportunities.

He joined Alan Buckley's struggling Third Division Rochdale on a one-month loan at the start of the 2003–04 campaign, having scored against the club in a pre-season friendly. Booked in his first three games, he was sent off 67 minutes into a 2–2 draw with Cambridge United at Spotland. The loan was extended to three months, and on 30 September, he scored at former club Macclesfield, in a 2–1 defeat, as he "danced into the box before gleefully steering the ball into the far corner". He returned to Manchester in November after turning down the opportunity to add to his 15 appearances for the "Dale", and was sent out on loan to Neale Cooper's Second Division Hartlepool United the following month. He played 15 games for the "Pools", scoring one goal in a 5–2 thrashing of Port Vale at Vale Park.

=== Barnsley ===
He left Victoria Park in March 2004 and, later in the month, signed a short-term contract with Paul Hart's Barnsley, also of the Second Division. He played nine games for the "Tykes", to finish the campaign with 39 appearances spread across three different clubs.

On 10 August 2004, Shuker scored both of Barnsley's goals in a 2–1 win over Bristol City at Oakwell. He continued to impress, though was sent off in a 2–2 draw with Swindon Town on 23 October, after what the club website described as a "ridiculous refereeing decision". Playing despite suffering from mumps, he ended the 2004–05 League One campaign with eight goals in 48 games, including a 30 yards (27 m) strike against Peterborough and a "beautiful volley" against Stockport County. For his performances, the club named him 'Player of the Season' and eventually offered him a new one-year contract, which he signed "after weeks of uncertainty".

Barnsley won promotion under Andy Ritchie in 2005–06, and Shuker played a total of 57 competitive games in league and cup competitions and was an ever-present in the league. He scored ten goals, including braces against Oldham Athletic and Swindon Town; Barnsley won every game in which Shuker found the net. He played in both legs of the play-off semi-final win over Huddersfield Town, and also played in the Millennium Stadium final, scoring a penalty in the shoot-out victory over Swansea City. He was offered a new contract, however, the club withdrew the offer after four weeks; Shuker said that "the manager wanted me back, the lads as well, it seems the chairman is running the club, picking the players. Money wasn't the issue, I turned down an extra £500 from another club because I wanted to stay." A year later, former teammate Daniel Nardiello also criticized Chairman Sheperd, saying "He's made promises to me in the past and not kept them, but I never made a fuss and just got on with things. I didn't like the way he treated my mate Chris Shuker a couple of seasons ago either."

=== Tranmere Rovers ===
Shuker switched clubs to Tranmere Rovers in July 2006, then managed by Ronnie Moore, signing a two-year deal. He played 50 games in 2006–07, scoring seven goals, as Rovers missed out on the play-offs by eight points. For his performances he was named on the PFA Team of the Year, and was handed a new three-year contract. He was limited to 27 appearances in 2007–08, having picked up a knee injury in December.

Despite missing pre-season training due a muscle injury, he started the 2008–09 season in fine form, causing manager Ronnie Moore to remark that "Shuker looked like Shuker today and it has been coming. He's a menace, he's a threat, he can go round people, they didn't know what to do with him." He played a total of 35 games as Rovers missed out on the play-offs by two points. However, he was ruled out for the rest of the season having broken his arm in March 2009 "after messing about with his girlfriend". He scored in a pre-season friendly against Liverpool in July 2009. However, the club struggled in 2009–10 under John Barnes and then Les Parry, avoiding relegation by a single point; despite making 32 appearances, Shuker was released at the end of the season.

=== Morecambe ===
He had a trial with Scottish Premier League club Motherwell, scoring in a friendly win over Forfar Athletic. However, a deal was not agreed, and so he instead considered a move to New Zealand. Shuker eventually signed for Morecambe of League Two in August 2010. Sammy McIlroy's side struggled, and avoided losing their Football League status by only four points. Shuker played 30 games but was not offered a contract for the following season.

"I had a bit of a bad time mentally in the game with a few things that happened at Tranmere and then I went to Morecambe, where I didn't enjoy it. The training was poor and I basically spent my time thinking that I didn't want to be there. It wasn't a confidence issue with me it was more to do with the training and being unfit because of it. It was a bit of a bad 18 months for me. Players who don't have your ability, but who want it more, become better than you so I had to sort that out. They wanted it more than me there because that was where they loved playing and basically I didn't want to be at the club. That wasn't down to ability – if I wanted to I could turn it on. We did the same thing every day – playing 15-a-side games on a postage stamp. Touching the ball was like murder, and playing on a mud bath every single day was terrible."

— Shuker fell out of love with the game on the west coast.

=== Port Vale ===
Pre-season interest from Bury came to nothing, and Shuker then spent some months out of the game. In December 2011, he joined League Two side Port Vale on trial. He joined the club on non-contract terms on 14 February 2012. He scored his first goal for the "Valiants" in his fourth game for the club, hitting a long-range effort in a 2–2 draw with Accrington Stanley at the Crown Ground. He stayed at Vale Park, despite a financial crisis leaving manager Micky Adams unable to promise Shuker the payment of his wages as listed in the player's contract. He finished 2011–12 with 16 appearances and one goal to his name. He agreed to sign a two-year deal with the club in May 2012.

He began the 2012–13 season in a central midfield partnership with Sam Morsy rather than in his usual position on the wing. He scored his second and final goal for the club in a League Cup tie against Burnley. He was then in-and-out of the starting line-up, as Ryan Burge staked his claim for a first-team spot. Shuker featured 34 times by the end of the campaign, as Vale secured promotion with a third-place finish.

Shuker rarely featured in the first half of the 2013–14 campaign but began to feature regularly as a substitute in January. Manager Micky Adams revealed Shuker had been absent from first-team squad contention due to a chronic knee injury Shuker had been suffering with for years, but had become more serious with time to the point where his future as a footballer was in doubt. Shuker announced his retirement at the end of the season on account of the knee injury.

=== Tranmere Rovers return ===
In October 2014, Shuker joined the coaching staff at former club Tranmere Rovers, linking up with Micky Adams, his former manager at Port Vale. He returned to playing professionally on 26 December, when he replaced Steve Jennings 60 minutes into a 2–0 defeat at Burton Albion. Rovers were relegated out of the Football League at the end of the 2014–15 season.

== Style of play ==
In February 2012, Barnsley and Port Vale teammate Marc Richards described 5 ft 5 in (1.65 m) Shuker as "small, nippy, tricky and he's got a quality right foot."

== Career statistics ==
Appearances and goals by club, season and competition
Season	Club	League			FA Cup		League Cup		Other		Total	
Season	Club	Division	Apps	Goals	Apps	Goals	Apps	Goals	Apps	Goals	Apps	Goals
Manchester City	2000–01	Premier League	0	0	0	0	0	0	—		0	0
Manchester City	2001–02	First Division	2	0	0	0	1	1	—		3	1
Manchester City	2002–03	Premier League	3	0	0	0	0	0	—		3	0
Manchester City	2003–04	Premier League	0	0	0	0	0	0	0	0	0	0
Manchester City	Total		5	0	0	0	1	1	0	0	6	1
Macclesfield Town (loan)	2000–01	Third Division	8	1	—		—		—		8	1
Walsall (loan)	2002–03	First Division	5	0	—		—		—		5	0
Rochdale (loan)	2003–04	Third Division	14	1	0	0	1	0	0	0	15	1
Hartlepool United (loan)	2003–04	Second Division	14	1	1	0	—		—		15	1
Barnsley	2003–04	Second Division	9	0	—		—		—		9	0
Barnsley	2004–05	League One	45	7	1	0	2	1	0	0	48	8
Barnsley	2005–06	League One	46	10	5	0	2	0	4 (Note: 1 appearance in the Football League Trophy and 3 appearances in the play-offs.)	0	57	10
Barnsley	Total		100	17	6	0	4	1	4	0	114	18
Tranmere Rovers	2006–07	League One	46	6	1	0	1	0	2 (Note: Appearance(s) in the Football League Trophy.)	1	50	7
Tranmere Rovers	2007–08	League One	23	3	2	0	1	0	1	0	27	3
Tranmere Rovers	2008–09	League One	28	3	3	1	0	0	4	1	35	5
Tranmere Rovers	2009–10	League One	26	2	4	1	2	0	0	0	32	3
Tranmere Rovers	Total		123	14	10	2	4	0	7	2	144	18
Morecambe	2010–11	League Two	27	2	0	0	2	0	1	0	30	2
Port Vale	2011–12	League Two	16	1	—		—		—		16	1
Port Vale	2012–13	League Two	29	0	1	0	1	1	3	0	34	1
Port Vale	2013–14	League One	10	0	1	0	0	0	1	0	12	0
Port Vale	Total		55	1	2	0	1	1	4	0	62	2
Tranmere Rovers	2014–15	League Two	3	0	0	0	—		—		3	0
Career total			354	37	19	2	13	3	16	2	402	44

== Honours ==
Barnsley

- Football League One play-offs: 2006

Port Vale

- Football League Two third-place promotion: 2012–13

Individual

- Barnsley Player of the Year: 2004–05
- PFA Team of the Year: 2006–07 League One
