= St Bede's Roman Catholic High School, Blackburn =

St Bede’s RC High School

Location
- Green Lane; Blackburn; Lancashire, BB2 4SR; England
- Coordinates: 53.72757°N 2.51589°W

Information
- Type: Voluntary aided school
- Religious affiliation: Roman Catholic
- Local authority: Blackburn with Darwen
- Department for Education URN: 119793 Tables
- Ofsted: Reports
- Headteacher: Daniel Milton
- Gender: Coeducational
- Age: 11 to 16
- Enrolment: 1,066 as of December 2022
- Houses: Southworth Rigby Arrowsmith Plessington
- Colours: Yellow, Blue, Red, Green
- Website: http://www.stbedesblackburn.com/

St Bede's RC High School is a coeducational Roman Catholic secondary school located in Blackburn in the English county of Lancashire.

It is a voluntary aided school administered by Blackburn with Darwen Borough Council and the Roman Catholic Diocese of Salford. The school offers GCSEs and BTECs as programmes of study for pupils, and was extensively refurbished in 2013.

== Notable former pupils ==
- AJ Odudu, television presenter
- Andy Taylor, footballer
- Anthony Pilkington, Footballer
- Paula Walker, British Bobsleigh
- Junior Hoilett, Footballer
