= 2010–11 Shrewsbury Town F.C. season =

Shrewsbury Town
2010–11 season
- Chairman: Roland Wycherley
- Manager: Graham Turner
- FA Cup: First Round
- League Cup: Second Round
- Football League Trophy: Second Round
- Average home league attendance: 5,875

Shrewsbury Town's 2010-11 season was their 120th year in football and their 124th year in existence. They finished 12th in League Two the season prior.

== League Two results ==
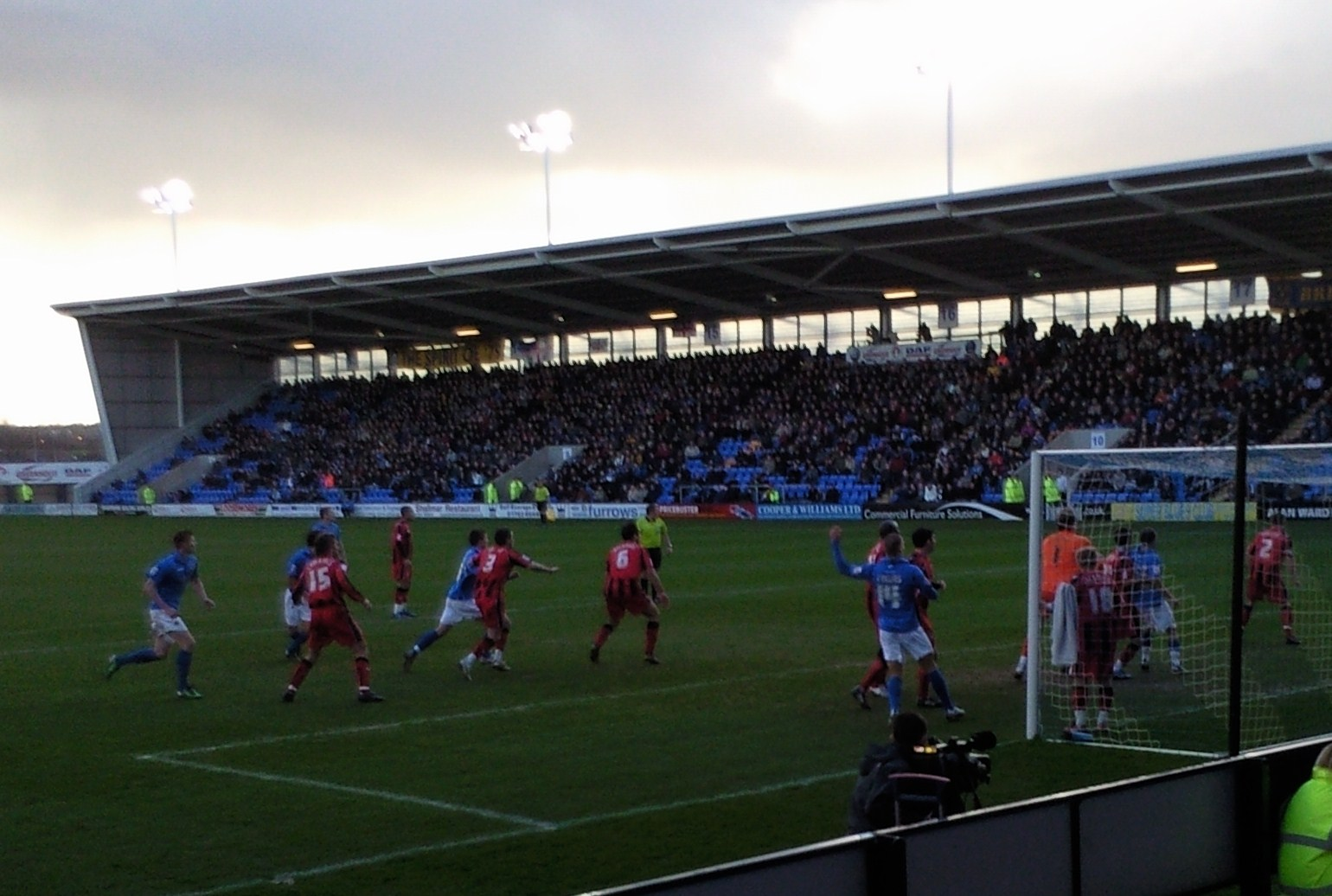
Action from the 0–0 draw at home to Gillingham in February

Date	Opponent	Venue	Result F–A	Attendance	Scorers	Ref.
7 August 2010	Bradford City	Home	3–1	6,993	Robinson 32', 51', 55'	
14 August 2010	Macclesfield Town	Away	1–0	2,302	Harrold 3'	
21 August 2010	Aldershot Town	Home	1–1	5,353	Sharps 29'	
28 August 2010	Stockport County	Away	4–0	4,350	Robinson 41', Harrold 58', Wright 63', 82'	
4 September 2010	Rotherham United	Home	1–0	6,206	Ainsworth 5'	
11 September 2010	Gillingham	Away	0–2	4,815	N/A	
18 September 2010	Northampton Town	Home	3–1	5,527	Harrold 12', Robinson 49', 53'	
25 September 2010	Wycombe Wanderers	Away	2–2	4,208	Bradshaw 76', Ainsworth 87'	
28 September 2010	Port Vale	Away	0–1	8,443	N/A	
2 October 2010	Torquay United	Home	1–1	6,034	Robinson 5'	
9 October 2010	Morecambe	Away	0–1	3,239	N/A	
16 October 2010	Lincoln City	Home	2–0	5,453	Wright 39', Robinson 42'	
23 October 2010	Chesterfield	Away	3–4	7,777	Wright 80', McIntyre 89', Disley 90+3'	
30 October 2010	Barnet	Home	2–1	5,331	Disley 39', Harrold 41'	
2 November 2010	Crewe Alexandra	Away	2–1	4,594	Wright 5', 90+3'	
13 November 2010	Stevenage	Away	1–1	2,765	Harrold 55'	
20 November 2010	Southend United	Home	1–1	5,406	Wright 49'	
23 November 2010	Hereford United	Home	4–0	6,565	Wright 14', 64', 77' Cansdell-Sherriff 72'	
11 December 2010	Cheltenham Town	Home	1–1	4,901	Bradshaw 89'	
1 January 2011	Burton Albion	Away	0–0	3,594	N/A	
3 January 2011	Crewe Alexandra	Home	0–1	6,561	N/A	
8 January 2011	Morecambe	Home	1–3	4,605	Cansdell-Sherriff 67'	
15 January 2011	Barnet	Away	1–1	2,164	Hughes 27' (o.g.)	
18 January 2011	Accrington Stanley	Away	3–1	1,362	Collins 50', 71', Wright 83'	
22 January 2011	Chesterfield	Home	0–0	6,483	N/A	
25 January 2011	Oxford United	Away	1–3	6,264	Wright 26'	
28 January 2011	Bury	Away	0–1	2,917	N/A	
1 February 2011	Burton Albion	Home	3–0	4,343	J. Taylor 55', 70', Harrold 72'	
5 February 2011	Southend United	Away	2–0	5,396	J. Taylor 43', Harrold 60'	
8 February 2011	Lincoln City	Away	5–1	3,202	J. Taylor 6', Kelly 13' (o.g.), Ainsworth 22', 24', 35'	
12 February 2011	Stevenage	Home	1–0	5,261	Wroe 38'	
26 February 2011	Gillingham	Home	0–0	5,574	N/A	
1 March 2011	Bury	Home	0–3	5,298	N/A	
5 March 2011	Northampton Town	Away	3–2	5,113	Davis 8', Collins 51', J. Taylor 87'	
8 March 2011	Port Vale	Home	2–2	6,402	Ainsworth 30', Collins 72'	
12 March 2011	Torquay United	Away	0–5	2,861	N/A	
19 March 2011	Wycombe Wanderers	Home	1–1	5,886	Collins 31'	
26 March 2011	Bradford City	Away	2–1	10,735	Bradshaw 77',87'	
29 March 2011	Rotherham United	Away	3–1	3,471	Collins 20', 48', Wroe 43'	
2 April 2011	Macclesfield Town	Home	4–1	5,396	Taylor 22', Ainsworth 67', 70', Harrold 90'	
9 April 2011	Aldershot Town	Away	0–3	2,371	N/A	
16 April 2011	Stockport County	Home	2–0	5,711	Bradshaw 17', Wroe 20'	
23 April 2011	Hereford United	Away	2–0	3,942	Collins 27', Bradshaw 56'	
25 April 2011	Accrington Stanley	Home	0–0	7,038	N/A	
30 April 2011	Cheltenham Town	Away	1–0	4,288	Wright 10'	
7 May 2011	Oxford United	Home	3–0	8,817	Wright 52', Davies 77', Ainsworth 89'	

=== Play-offs ===
Round	Date	Opponent	Venue	Result F–A	Attendance	Scorers	Ref.
Semi-final first leg	14 May 2011	Torquay United	Away	0–2			
Semi-final second leg	20 May 2011	Torquay United	Home	0–0			

== FA Cup results ==
Shrewsbury entered and left the FA Cup in the first round proper.

Round	Date	Opponent	Venue	Result F–A	Attendance	Scorers
1	6 November 2010	Southampton	Away	0–2	10,410	

== League Cup results ==
Round	Date	Opponent	Venue	Result F–A	Attendance	Scorers
1	10 August 2010	Charlton	Home	4–3	3,700	Robinson 36' Mambo 42' (o.g.) O'Donnell 62' Harrold 76'
2	24 August 2010	Stoke City	Away	1–2	11,995	Leslie 79'

== Football League Trophy results ==
Round	Date	Opponent	Venue	Result F–A	Attendance	Scorers
1	31 August 2010	Oldham Athletic	Away	1–0	2,703	Leslie 83'
2	5 October 2010	Bury	Away	0–0 (a.e.t.) (Note: Bury won 6–5 on penalties)	1,944	

== Squad statistics ==
Appearances for competitive matches only

No.	Pos.	Name	League Two		FA Cup		League Cup		Total		Discipline	
No.	Pos.	Name	Apps	Goals	Apps	Goals	Apps	Goals	Apps	Goals	Yellow card	Red card
1	GK	(England) Chris Neal	17 (1)	0	1	0	1	0	19 (1)	0	2	0
2	DEF	(England) David Raven	13	0	0	0	2	0	15	0	2	0
3	DEF	(England) Mat Sadler	19	0	1	0	2	0	22	0	1	0
4	MID	(England) Sean McAllister	14 (2)	0	1	0	2	0	17 (2)	0	2	0
5	DEF	(England) Ian Sharps	17	1	0	0	2	0	19	1	2	0
6	DEF	(Australia) Shane Cansdell-Sherriff	15 (2)	1	1	0	1	0	17 (2)	1	2	0
7	MID	(England) Mark Wright	19	10	1	0	2	0	22	10	2	0
8	MID	(England) Kevin McIntyre	9 (5)	1	1	0	1	0	11 (5)	1	1	1
9	FW	(England) Matt Harrold	16 (1)	5	0 (1)	0	1	1	17 (2)	6	2	1
10	FW	(England) Jake Robinson	19	8	1	0	1	1	21	9	2	0
11	MID	(England) Steven Leslie	4 (6)	10	0	0	1	1	5 (6)	1	0	0
