= Calvin Zola =

Congolese footballer (born 1984)

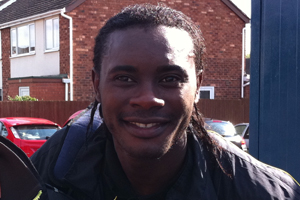
- Zola pictured in 2011

Personal information
- Full name: Calvin Zola-Makongo
- Date of birth: 31 December 1984 (age 41)
- Place of birth: Kinshasa, Zaire
- Height: 1.91 m (6 ft 3 in)
- Position: Forward

Youth career
- 2001–2003: Newcastle United

Senior career*
Years	Team	Apps	(Gls)
2003–2004	Newcastle United	0	(0)
2003–2004	→ Oldham Athletic (loan)	25	(5)
2004–2008	Tranmere Rovers	96	(16)
2008–2011	Crewe Alexandra	67	(21)
2011	→ Burton Albion (loan)	18	(3)
2011–2013	Burton Albion	67	(23)
2013–2014	Aberdeen	20	(3)
2014–2015	Stevenage	7	(0)
Total		300	(71)
- * Club domestic league appearances and goals

Calvin Zola-Makongo (born 31 December 1984), is a Congolese former professional footballer who played as a forward. Born in Kinshasa, Zaire, he began his career as a youth player at Newcastle United. Zola went on to have spells at Tranmere Rovers, Crewe Alexandra, Burton Albion and Aberdeen. His last club was Stevenage, who released him in May 2015 due to injury setbacks.

== Career ==
Zola began his career Newcastle United, and he spent a loan spell at Oldham Athletic before moving to Tranmere Rovers, where problems were discovered with his visa and he was unable to work (i.e. play) until a solution was reached. In May 2005 he was granted a full permit and returned in time for training for the 2005–06 season.

In June 2008, he signed with League One club Crewe Alexandra for a transfer fee of £200,000. On 18 January 2011, he signed on loan to Burton Albion until the end of the season. In May 2011, Zola was released from his contract at Crewe Alexandra. and agreed to join Burton on a permanent basis the following month.

On 18 June 2013, Zola signed a two-year deal with Scottish Premiership side Aberdeen. He scored his first goal for Aberdeen on 14 September 2013, in a 3–0 win against Partick Thistle. Zola had his contract cancelled by Aberdeen after the 2013–14 season, during which he had scored three goals.

Zola joined Stevenage on 20 June 2014 following his release from Aberdeen.

After an injury hit season, Zola was released by Stevenage on 20 May 2015, along with 12 other players.

== Career statistics ==
As of 2 May 2015

Appearances and goals by club, season and competition
Club	Season	League			FA Cup		League Cup		Other		Total	
Club	Season	Division	Apps	Goals	Apps	Goals	Apps	Goals	Apps	Goals	Apps	Goals
Newcastle United	2001–02	Premier League	0	0	0	0	0	0	0	0	0	0
Newcastle United	2002–03	Premier League	0	0	0	0	0	0	0	0	0	0
Newcastle United	2003–04	Premier League	0	0	0	0	0	0	0	0	0	0
Newcastle United	Total		0	0	0	0	0	0	0	0	0	0
Oldham Athletic (loan)	2003–04	Second Division	25	5	1	1	0	0	2 (Note: Appearance(s) in Football League Trophy)	1	28	7
Tranmere Rovers	2004–05	League One	15	2	1	0	2	1	1	1	19	4
Tranmere Rovers	2005–06	League One	22	4	0	0	0	0	1	0	23	4
Tranmere Rovers	2006–07	League One	29	5	1	0	1	0	0	0	31	5
Tranmere Rovers	2007–08	League One	30	5	4	0	1	0	0	0	35	5
Tranmere Rovers	Total		96	16	6	0	4	1	2	1	108	18
Crewe Alexandra	2008–09	League One	27	5	4	0	1	0	2	0	34	5
Crewe Alexandra	2009–10	League Two	34	15	1	1	1	1	1	1	37	18
Crewe Alexandra	2010–11	League Two	6	1	0	0	1	0	1	0	8	1
Crewe Alexandra	Total		67	21	5	1	3	1	4	1	79	24
Burton Albion (loan)	2010–11	League Two	18	3	1	1	0	0	0	0	19	4
Burton Albion	2011–12	League Two	36	12	1	1	1	1	1	0	39	14
Burton Albion	2012–13	League Two	31	11	4	3	1	0	2 (Note: Appearance(s) in Football League Two play-offs)	2	38	16
Burton Albion	Total		85	26	6	5	2	1	3	2	96	34
Aberdeen	2013–14	Scottish Premiership	20	3	1	0	3	0	0	0	24	3
Stevenage	2014–15	League Two	7	0	0	0	0	0	1	0	8	0
Career total			300	71	19	7	12	3	12	5	343	86
