= Andy Taylor (footballer, born 1986) =

English footballer and coach

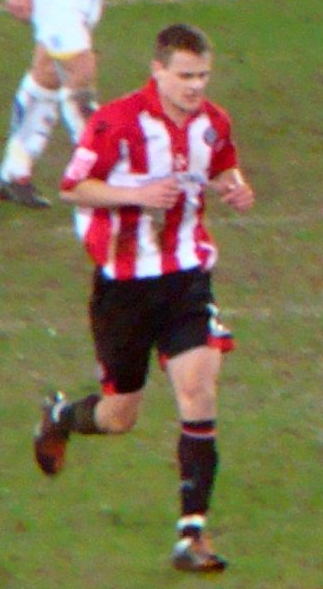
- Taylor playing for Sheffield United in 2010

Personal information
- Full name: Andrew Taylor
- Date of birth: 14 March 1986 (age 40)
- Place of birth: Blackburn, England
- Height: 5 ft 11 in (1.80 m)
- Position: Defender

Team information
- Current team: Barrow (assistant manager)

Senior career*
Years	Team	Apps	(Gls)
2004–2008	Blackburn Rovers	0	(0)
2006	→ Queens Park Rangers (loan)	3	(0)
2006	→ Blackpool (loan)	3	(0)
2006	→ Crewe Alexandra (loan)	4	(0)
2007	→ Huddersfield Town (loan)	8	(0)
2007–2008	→ Tranmere Rovers (loan)	10	(1)
2008–2009	Tranmere Rovers	59	(2)
2009–2012	Sheffield United	39	(0)
2012–2016	Walsall	140	(4)
2016–2018	Blackpool	45	(2)
2018–2019	Oldham Athletic	15	(0)
2019–2020	AFC Fylde	13	(1)
Total		339	(10)

International career
2002	England U16	4	(0)
2002–2003	England U17	6	(0)
2004	England U18	3	(0)
2004–2005	England U19	10	(0)
2005	England U20	1	(0)

Managerial career
- 2022: AFC Fylde (interim manager)
- 2024–2026: Bolton Wanderers B Team
- 2025: Bolton Wanderers (joint caretaker)
- * Club domestic league appearances and goals as of 04:41, 5 March 2020 (UTC)

Andrew Taylor (born 14 March 1986) is an English former footballer who played as a defender. He is currently the Assistant Manager at Barrow.

== Early life ==
Born in Blackburn, Lancashire, Taylor attended St Paul's RC Primary and St Bede's RC High School in Blackburn and is a product of Blackburn Rovers Youth Academy. Having represented England at both under-19 and under-20 level. Taylor then turned professional in 2004 and Taylor signed a new three-year deal with Blackburn Rovers in September 2005.

== Club career ==
=== Blackburn Rovers ===
Whilst at Blackburn, Taylor has had loan spells at Queens Park Rangers, Blackpool, Crewe Alexandra, Huddersfield Town (from 31 January 2007 to 5 April 2007) and Tranmere Rovers.

=== Tranmere Rovers ===
Tranmere decided to make his loan move permanent, signing him on a two-and-a-half-year contract for an undisclosed fee in the January 2008 transfer window. Taylor made 30 league appearances in total for Tranmere during the 2007–08 season, scoring a single goal, a half volley against Crewe on New Year's Day 2008. His only goal of the 2008–09 season came at home to Colchester, he curled in a long range free kick.

=== Sheffield United ===
Taylor was transferred to Sheffield United in July 2009 for an undisclosed fee. He made his full debut for The Blades came in the opening game of the season in August 2009; a 0–0 draw with Middlesbrough. After an initial run of games Taylor sustained an injury on Boxing Day 2010 which eventually kept him sidelined for fourteen months. On his return to fitness, he was unable to break back into the side and made only four more appearances for United during the 2011–12 season and was subsequently released by The Blades in May 2012 when his contract expired.

=== Walsall ===
After being released by Sheffield United, Taylor signed for Walsall on non-contract terms on 28 August. He played against Queens Park Rangers and had an excellent debut for the Saddlers. After the match, Taylor told the club's official website that he is happy to join Walsall, insisting he wanted to play regularly . Having made twenty-two appearances for the club, Taylor signed a new 18-month contract at the club.

On 12 October 2013 he scored a memorable free-kick in the sixth minute of injury time in a 1–1 game away to Colchester. The goal proved especially lucrative for a family in the Swedish city of Malmö who won 10.103.752 SEK (approximately £929,793) on the national football betting called Stryktipset.

=== Blackpool ===
He was released by Blackpool at the end of the 2017–18 season.

== International career ==
Taylor has represented England at international level being capped by both the England under-19 under-20 teams respectively.

== Coaching career ==
In July 2020, Taylor became a coach at AFC Fylde following his retirement. In September 2022, following the resignation of James Rowe, Taylor was appointed interim manager.

Taylor left his role at AFC Fylde in January 2024 in order to pursue a career in youth development.

On 12 January 2024, he agreed to become the new the head coach of the Bolton Wanderers B Team. On 22 January 2025, after manager Ian Evatt left the club by mutual consent; Taylor, Andrew Tutte, and Julian Darby were named as joint caretaker managers. Their first game in charge was a 1–0 away win against Huddersfield Town, which brought an end to Huddersfield 16 match unbeaten run. They took charge of one more match, a 3–1 home win against Northampton Town, before Steven Schumacher was hired as Evatt's replacement on 30 January. They returned to their youth/B team roles with a 100% winning record as caretakers. Taylor's Bolton B team won the 2025 Lancashire Senior Cup final, with Bolton B beating Burnley's reserves.

On 18 May 2026, it was announced that Taylor had left Bolton by mutual consent and later that day he became the new assistant manager at Barrow.

== Career statistics ==
Appearances and goals by club, season and competition
Club	Season	League			FA Cup		League Cup		Other		Total	
Club	Season	Division	Apps	Goals	Apps	Goals	Apps	Goals	Apps	Goals	Apps	Goals
Queens Park Rangers (loan)	2005–06	Championship	3	0	0	0	0	0	0	0	3	0
Blackpool (loan)	2005–06	League One	3	0	0	0	0	0	0	0	3	0
Crewe Alexandra (loan)	2006–07	League One	4	0	0	0	1	0	1 (Note: Appearance(s) in Football League Trophy)	0	6	0
Huddersfield Town (loan)	2006–07	League One	8	0	0	0	0	0	0	0	8	0
Tranmere Rovers (loan)	2007–08	League One	10	1	3	0	0	0	0	0	13	1
Loans from Blackburn:	Total		28	1	3	0	1	0	1	0	33	1
Tranmere Rovers	2007–08	League One	20	1	0	0	0	0	0	0	20	1
Tranmere Rovers	2008–09	League One	39	1	4	0	1	0	4	0	48	1
Tranmere Rovers	Total		59	2	4	0	1	0	4	0	68	2
Sheffield United	2009–10	Championship	26	0	3	0	1	0	0	0	30	0
Sheffield United	2010–11	Championship	9	0	0	0	1	0	0	0	10	0
Sheffield United	2011–12	League One	4	0	0	0	0	0	1 (Note: Appearance in League One play-offs)	0	5	0
Sheffield United	Total		39	0	3	0	2	0	1	0	45	0
Walsall	2012–13	League One	34	0	0	0	0	0	1	0	35	0
Walsall	2013–14	League One	33	1	2	0	1	0	1	0	37	1
Walsall	2014–15	League One	39	1	2	0	2	0	5	0	48	1
Walsall	2015–16	League One	34	2	3	0	0	0	2 (Note: One appearance in Football League Trophy and one in League One play-offs)	0	39	2
Walsall	Total		140	4	7	0	3	0	9	0	159	4
Blackpool	2016–17	League Two	38	2	5	0	0	0	2 (Note: Appearances in League Two play-offs)	0	45	2
Blackpool	2017–18	League One	7	0	1	0	1	0	4 (Note: Appearance in EFL Trophy)	0	13	0
Blackpool	Total		45	2	6	0	1	0	6	0	58	2
Oldham Athletic	2018–19	League Two	15	0	1	0	0	0	3	0	19	0
AFC Fylde	2019–20	National League	13	1	2	0	0	0	0	0	15	1
Career total			339	10	26	0	8	0	24	0	397	10

== Managerial statistics ==
As of match played 28 January 2025

Managerial record by team and tenure
Team	From	To	Record					Ref.
Team	From	To	P	W	D	L	Win %	Ref.
AFC Fylde (interim manager)	29 September 2022	14 November 2022	11	4	4	3	36.36	
Bolton Wanderers (joint caretaker)	22 January 2025	30 January 2025	2	2	0	0	100.00	
Total			13	6	4	3	46.15	—

== Honours ==
=== Player ===
Walsall

- Football League Trophy runner-up: 2014–15

=== Manager ===
Bolton Wanderers B

- Lancashire Senior Cup: 2024–25
