= Chris Greenacre =

British footballer (born 1977)

- Greenacre coaching the Wellington Phoenix in 2026.

Personal information
- Full name: Christopher Mark Greenacre
- Date of birth: 23 December 1977 (age 48)
- Place of birth: Wakefield, England
- Position: Striker

Team information
- Current team: Wellington Phoenix (head coach)

Youth career
- 1994: Leeds United

Senior career*
Years	Team	Apps	(Gls)
1995–2000	Manchester City	8	(1)
1997	→ Cardiff City (loan)	11	(2)
1998	→ Blackpool (loan)	4	(0)
1998–1999	→ Scarborough (loan)	12	(2)
1999	→ Northampton Town (loan)	0	(0)
1999–2000	→ Mansfield Town (loan)	10	(5)
2000–2002	Mansfield Town	111	(44)
2002–2005	Stoke City	75	(7)
2005–2009	Tranmere Rovers	142	(46)
2009–2012	Wellington Phoenix	84	(19)
Total		457	(126)

Managerial career
- 2013: Wellington Phoenix (interim)
- 2016–2017: Wellington Phoenix
- 2017: Wellington Phoenix Reserves
- 2018: Wellington Phoenix (interim)
- 2021–2026: Wellington Phoenix Reserves
- 2024–2026: New Zealand U20
- 2026–: Wellington Phoenix
- * Club domestic league appearances and goals

Christopher Mark Greenacre (born 23 December 1977) is an English football manager and former player who is the head coach of Wellington Phoenix.

Greenacre began his career with Manchester City in 1996. Whilst at Maine Road he was sent out on loan to Cardiff City, Blackpool, Scarborough, Northampton Town and Mansfield Town in order to gain first team experience. However, he failed to make the grade at Manchester City and so joined Mansfield Town on a permanent transfer. He became a prolific scorer for the "Stags" scoring 58 goals for the club in three seasons. This led to Division One side Stoke City signing him in August 2002. However, despite arriving with high expectations he struggled to cope with the higher level and managed just 9 goals in three seasons at the Britannia Stadium.

He left for Tranmere Rovers where he found his level and in four seasons at Tranmere Greenacre scored 53 goals. After his contract expired at Rovers he decided to join New Zealand based, A-League side Wellington Phoenix. He played three seasons for Wellington helping the club to three consecutive finals series places before retiring in 2012.

== Club career ==
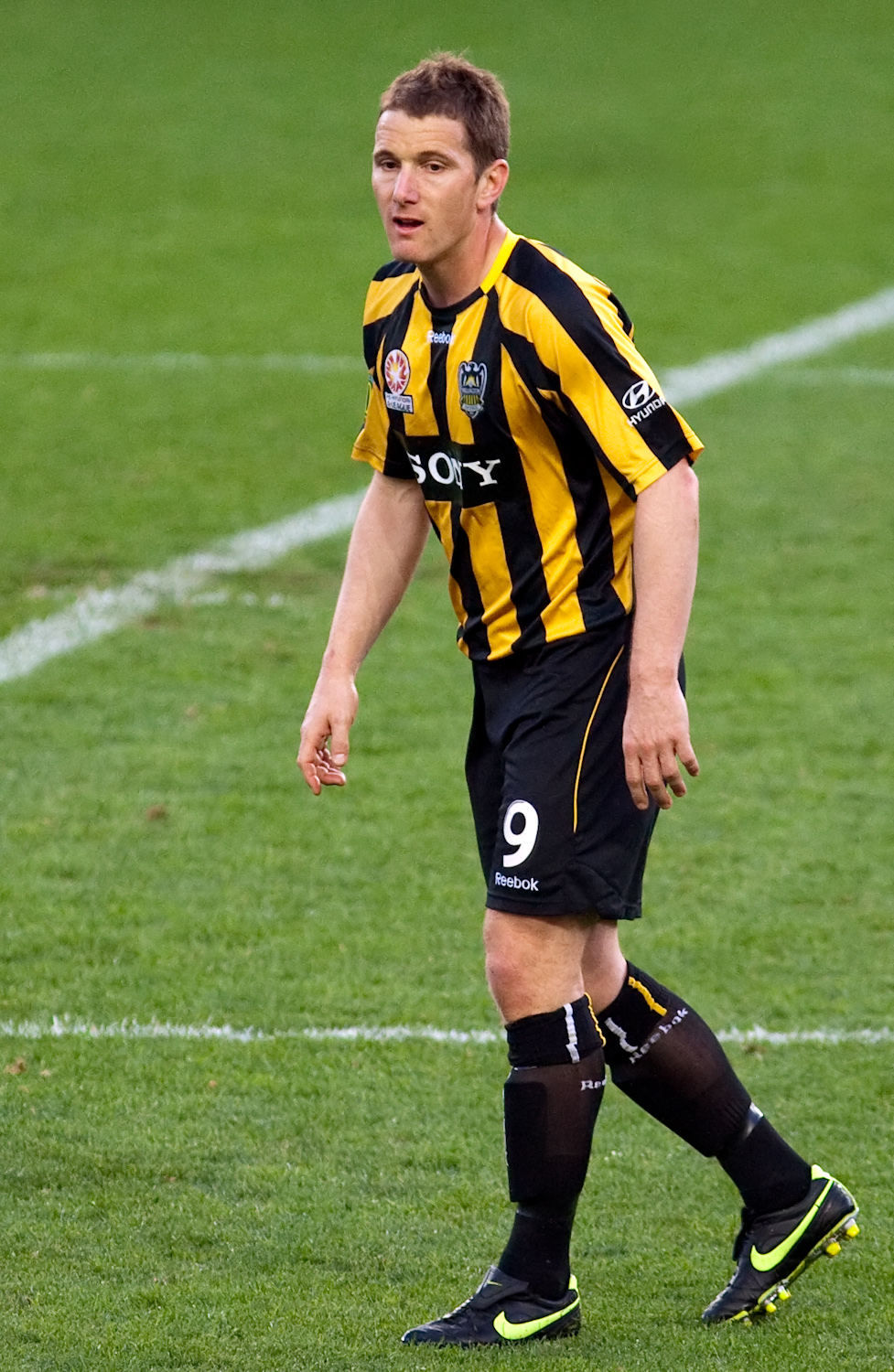
Greenacre playing for the Wellington Phoenix in 2009.

Greenacre was born in Wakefield and at the age of 13 he signed schoolboy forms at Manchester City, having previously been on the books at Leeds United. He signed as an apprentice at 16, and turned professional in 1995. His senior debut came in February 1997 against Swindon Town, when he came on as a substitute, replacing Paul Dickov. He made three further substitute appearances that season, without scoring. During his time at Manchester City most of his first team football came in the form of loan spells with lower league clubs. In his first start for Manchester City in October 1997, he scored the winning goal in a 1–0 win against Crewe Alexandra. This was his only goal for the club, and he started only two further matches.

Greenacre subsequently went on to play on loan for Cardiff City, Blackpool and Scarborough before joining Mansfield Town in 2000. He became a prolific goalscorer at the Field Mill scoring nine goals in 1999–2000, 21 in 2000–01 and 28 in 2001–02. This attracted the attentions from bigger club's and in the summer of 2002 he joined Stoke City. His start at Stoke was however hampered by injury. Greenacre had a frustrating 2002–03 which saw him make 33 appearances scoring six goals which included a vital winner against Brighton & Hove Albion. In 2003–04 he found himself out of the team after the arrival of Ade Akinbiyi and made 16 appearances scoring twice. In 2004–05 he played in 34 matches but only scored once and was released at the end of the season.

He joined Tranmere Rovers in July 2005. Under the management of Brian Little, Tranmere finished 18th in League One in the 2005–06 season, but Greenacre himself finished top scorer with 18 goals in 49 games for the club. This included a hat-trick against Yeovil Town on 28 December and two goals against Oldham Athletic in August. In 2006–07 under Ronnie Moore when Greenacre again finished top scorer, this time with a total of 19 goals, and signed a two-year extension to his contract at Prenton Park. A further 14 goals in all competitions during the 2007–08 season saw him again finish the season as the club's top scorer. He scored his first goals for the 2008–09 season with a brace away at Peterborough in a 2–2 draw.

On 21 April 2009, it was announced that Greenacre had signed with Wellington-based, New Zealand A-League club Wellington Phoenix on a two-year contract. He made his league debut on 9 August 2009 scoring in a losing effort to the Newcastle Jets FC. Before a bothersome knee injury, Greenacre had scored five goals in 16 appearances for the Phoenix.

Greenacre started season 2010–11 by scoring twice in the opening game of the season against the Gold Coast United FC at Westpac Stadium.

== Coaching career ==
Greenacre coaching the Wellington Phoenix in 2026.

On 22 July 2011, Greenacre accepted a player/coaching role with his club Wellington Phoenix. Greenacre already holds a UEFA B coaching licence and will reportedly be coaching the forwards as well as playing when chosen. On 18 July 2012 he announced his retirement from the game and accepted a position as assistant manager at Wellington Phoenix.

In October 2012, Due to the absence of Ricki Herbert due to international duties, Greenacre was appointed as the caretaker manager of the Wellington Phoenix for their Round 2 clash with Melbourne Heart. Despite missing 7 first team players due to international duties, and despite playing an away clash, the Phoenix managed to obtain a 1–1 draw with the Heart, courtesy of a Paul Ifill penalty.

On 26 February 2013, Greenacre was appointed interim manager of Wellington Phoenix until the end of the season after Ricki Herbert resigned. He was replaced by Ernie Merrick for the 2013–14 A-League season. Following Merrick's resignation on 5 December 2016, Greenacre was appointed as co-coach of the A-League side alongside Des Buckingham, originally as interim coaches, and in January 2017 confirmed for the roles until the end of the 2016-2017 season. Greenacre and Buckingham applied for the role on a permanent basis at the end of the season, but were passed over in favour of Darije Kalezic.

On 12 October 2017, Greenacre was appointed coach of Wellington Phoenix Reserves, taking over from Andy Hedge.

New Zealand football announced in January 2018 Greenacre would be assistant to Des Buckingham for the New Zealand national under-20 football team for the 2019 FIFA U-20 World Cup cycle. Greenacre would retain his position with the Wellington Phoenix while fulfilling this role.

Greenacre began his third period with the Wellington Phoenix A-League side when he was again appointed interim head coach following the departure of Darije Kalezic on 5 March 2018.

On 17 November 2021, Greenacre was confirmed as the head coach of the Wellington Phoenix FC Reserves. In his first season in charge, he guided the team to a third placed finish.

Greenacre was appointed as an assistant coach to Darren Bazley's All Whites staff for the September 2023, Olympic Qualifiers in Auckland. New Zealand qualified in an unbeaten campaign and headed to Paris for the 2024, Olympic Games.They beat Fiji in the final.

Greenacre was appointed as the head coach of New Zealand's Men's U20 team in January 2024. He was placed in charge for the upcoming 2025 World Cup Qualifying campaign in Samoa. New Zealand became the champions of OFC where they beat New Caledonia in the final, 0-3. New Zealand qualified for the final by beating Fiji, 1-0 after a Ryan Watson goal secured qualification. Greenacre will lead the team for the 2025 U20 Men's World Cup in Chile.

Following the resignation of Giancarlo Italiano after a 5–0 loss to Auckland FC, it was announced that Greenacre would take charge on an interim basis until the end of the 2025–26 season. This would be his fourth stint as interim manager of the team.

Greenacre began his fourth interim tenure with a 1–0 defeat to Sydney FC at Hnry Stadium. He then oversaw three consecutive victories, including a 1–0 win over Melbourne Victory at AAMI Park, Wellington Phoenix's first win in Melbourne since 2017, keeping Wellington's slim finals hopes alive. Though those hopes were effectively ended the following week by a 2–0 defeat to Melbourne City. Greenacre's final match as interim head coach came in a 4–0 loss to Macarthur FC in the Phoenix's final game of the season.

On 28 April, Greenacre was appointed Wellington Phoenix head coach on a permanent basis, becoming the club's seventh head coach in the A-League. He was appointed on a one-year deal for the 2026–27 A-League Men season, with the club holding an option for a further year.

== Personal life ==
Greenacre is a Leeds United supporter.

== Career statistics ==
Appearances and goals by club, season and competition
Club	Season	League			FA Cup		League Cup		Other		Total	
Club	Season	Division	Apps	Goals	Apps	Goals	Apps	Goals	Apps	Goals	Apps	Goals
Manchester City	1996–97	First Division	4	0	0	0	0	0	—		4	0
Manchester City	1997–98	First Division	3	1	1	0	0	0	—		4	1
Manchester City	1998–99	Second Division	1	0	0	0	0	0	0	0	1	0
Manchester City	Total		8	1	1	0	0	0	0	0	9	1
Cardiff City (loan)	1997–98	Third Division	11	2	0	0	0	0	0	0	11	2
Blackpool (loan)	1997–98	Second Division	4	0	0	0	0	0	0	0	4	0
Scarborough (loan)	1998–99	Third Division	12	2	0	0	0	0	1 (Note: Appearances in Football League Trophy)	0	13	2
Mansfield Town	1999–2000	Third Division	31	9	0	0	0	0	2	0	33	9
Mansfield Town	2000–01	Third Division	46	19	2	1	4	1	1	0	53	21
Mansfield Town	2001–02	Third Division	44	21	3	5	1	2	0	0	48	28
Mansfield Town	Total		121	49	5	6	5	3	3	0	134	58
Stoke City	2002–03	First Division	30	4	3	2	0	0	—		33	6
Stoke City	2003–04	First Division	13	2	2	0	1	0	—		16	2
Stoke City	2004–05	Championship	32	1	1	0	1	0	—		34	1
Stoke City	Total		75	7	6	2	2	0	—		83	9
Tranmere Rovers	2005–06	League One	45	16	1	1	1	0	2	1	49	18
Tranmere Rovers	2006–07	League One	44	17	2	2	1	0	2	0	49	19
Tranmere Rovers	2007–08	League One	40	11	2	3	1	0	1	0	44	14
Tranmere Rovers	2008–09	League One	13	2	2	0	1	0	4	0	20	2
Tranmere Rovers	Total		142	46	7	6	4	0	9	1	162	53
Wellington Phoenix	2009–10	A-League	24	6	—		—		—		24	6
Wellington Phoenix	2010–11	A-League	31	8	—		—		—		31	8
Wellington Phoenix	2011–12	A-League	29	5	—		—		—		29	5
Wellington Phoenix	Total		84	19	—		—		—		84	19
Career total			457	126	19	14	11	3	13	1	500	144

== Managerial statistics ==
As of 25 October 2026

Team	From	To	Record				
Team	From	To	G	W	D	L	Win %
Wellington Phoenix (interim)	26 February 2013	31 March 2013	6	2	1	3	33.33
Phoenix Reserves	17 November 2021	23 February 2026	109	52	17	40	47.71
New Zealand U20	16 January 2024	23 February 2026	8	6	0	2	75.00
Wellington Phoenix	23 February 2026	present	10	6	1	3	60.00
Total			133	66	19	48	49.62

== Honours ==
New Zealand

- OFC U-19 Championship: 2024

Individual

- PFA Team of the Year: 2001–02 Third Division

Men's U23 Olympic Games Paris Qualification, 2023
