= Michael Johnston (Welsh footballer) =

Welsh footballer (born 1987)

Personal information
- Date of birth: 16 December 1987 (age 38)
- Positions: Centre-back; left back; right back

Youth career
- 2006–2007: Tranmere Rovers U18

Senior career*
| Years | Team | Apps | (Gls) |
| 2007–2008 | Tranmere Rovers | | |
| 2007–2008 | →Bangor City (loan) | | |
| 2008–2015 | Bangor City | 239 | |
| 2015–2016 | Llandudno | 15 | |
| 2016 | Caernarfon Town | | |
| 2016–? | Brickfield Rangers | 5 | |
| 2019– | Bangor 1876 | 3 | (0) |

International career
- Wales U17
| | Wales U19 | 3 | (0) |

Managerial career
- 2022–2026: Bangor 1876
- * Club domestic league appearances and goals

Michael Johnston (born 16 December 1987) is a Welsh footballer, turned manager. He plays as a defender.

== Playing career ==
Michael Johnston began his career in the Tranmere Rovers youth system, and was a member of the Wales under-17 and under-19 teams. He joined Tranmere's reserve squad in 2007, and was loaned to Bangor City that September. After being voted Bangor City's player of the season, he joined them on a free transfer in April 2008. He remained with the club for eight seasons, winning three Welsh Cups and the Welsh Premier League championship in 2010–2011.

Johnston signed with Llandudno in 2015, where he played mostly at right back. He joined Caernarfon Town in July 2016, and moved to Brickfield Rangers in September.

In 2012, Dave Jones of the Daily Post nominated Johnston for the UEFA Best Player in Europe Award, writing "I cover the Welsh Premier week in, week out and he's one of the best defenders I've seen." In 2016 Jones named him one of the ten best defenders in WPL history.

In June 2019 he signed for Bangor City phoenix club Bangor 1876.

== Management career ==
In February 2022 he was appointed joint manager of Bangor 1876 alongside Mel Jones. He resigned in late August 2026 citing family and work commitments.
