= Josh Macauley =

English footballer

Personal information
- Full name: Joshua Lee Macauley
- Date of birth: 2 March 1991 (age 35)
- Place of birth: Liverpool, England
- Position: Forward

Senior career*
Years	Team	Apps	(Gls)
2008–2010	Tranmere Rovers	1	(0)
2009	→ Colwyn Bay (loan)	10	(5)
2010	→ Vauxhall Motors (loan)	4	(2)
2010–2011	Bala Town	26	(6)
2011–2012	Prescot Cables		
2012–2014	Aberystwyth Town		
2014–2015	Cefn Druids		
- * Club domestic league appearances and goals as of 16:14, 24 May 2010 (UTC)

Joshua Lee Macauley (born 2 March 1991) is an English footballer.

== Career ==
Beginning his career as a youth player at Tranmere Rovers, Macauley made his debut for the club on 24 January 2009 in 1–1 draw with Carlisle United as a substitute in place of Charlie Barnett. He joined Colwyn Bay on loan in September 2009 on an initial one-month loan deal. On his signing, Colwyn manager Neil Young stated "Josh will be a big asset for us with his power and pace and he is a goal-scorer". Macauley made his debut for the Seagulls against Rossendale United, scoring twice in a 4–0 win, and went on to score 5 goals in 10 appearances. He later spent time on loan at Conference North side Vauxhall Motors.

Released by Tranmere on his return, Macauley spent time on trial with Chester, managed by his former Colwyn Bay coach Neil Young, and Aberystywth Town before eventually signing for Bala Town. He went on to score six goals in twenty-six Welsh Premier League appearances for the club.

He then went on to join Prescot Cables before returning to the Welsh league, this time joining Aberystwyth Town in January 2012.

In the summer of 2014 he joined Cefn Druids.
