= Paul Henry (English footballer) =

English footballer

Personal information
- Full name: Paul Nicholas Henry
- Date of birth: 28 January 1988 (age 38)
- Place of birth: Liverpool, Merseyside, England
- Height: 5 ft 9 in (1.75 m)
- Position: Midfielder

Team information
- Current team: Marine

Youth career
- –2006: Tranmere Rovers

Senior career*
Years	Team	Apps	(Gls)
2006–2009	Tranmere Rovers	3	(0)
2008	→ The New Saints (loan)	7	(1)
2009–2010	Witton Albion		
2010	Northwich Victoria	12	(0)
2011–	Marine		
- * Club domestic league appearances and goals as of 11:09, 20 July 2009 (UTC)

Paul Nicholas Henry (born 28 January 1988) is an English footballer who plays for Marine. He previously played in the Football League for Tranmere Rovers.

== Career ==
Henry signed his second professional contract with Tranmere Rovers in July 2007 after captaining the reserves. The youngster, who is the nephew of former Rovers midfielder Nick Henry, is able to play in the centre of midfield or defence and was an unused substitute three times in 2007–08. He made his first appearance for the first team as a substitute during a 0–0 draw with Doncaster Rovers in November 2007 and made his first start against Luton Town a month later. In January 2008, Henry joined Welsh Premier League side The New Saints on loan.

He joined Witton Albion, and then Northwich Victoria before being was released by the Vics on 31 December 2010. He then signed for Marine shortly after.
