= John Achterberg =

Dutch footballer (born 1971)

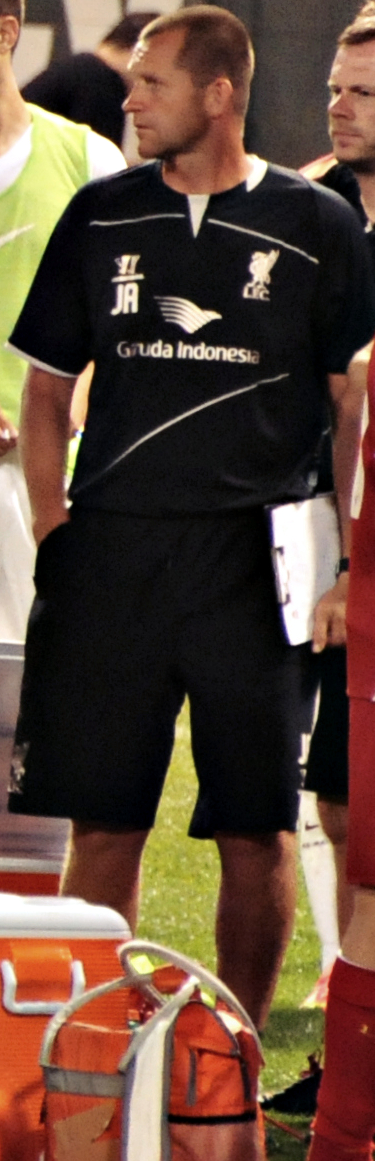
- Achterberg with Liverpool in 2014

Personal information
- Date of birth: 8 July 1971 (age 55)
- Place of birth: Utrecht, Netherlands
- Height: 1.85 m (6 ft 1 in)
- Position: Goalkeeper

Team information
- Current team: Al Qadsiah (goalkeeper coach)

Senior career*
Years	Team	Apps	(Gls)
1993–1996	NAC Breda	9	(0)
1996–1998	FC Eindhoven	38	(0)
1998–2009	Tranmere Rovers	351	(0)
Total		398	(0)
- * Club domestic league appearances and goals

John Achterberg (born 8 July 1971) is a Dutch former professional footballer who played as a goalkeeper for NAC Breda, FC Eindhoven and Tranmere Rovers. He is the goalkeeping coach for Al Qadsiah.

== Club career ==
Achterberg was born in Utrecht. He first signed for Tranmere Rovers in 1998, after a successful trial as a replacement for the Everton bound Steve Simonsen. He was immediately selected for the first team due to an injury to Danny Coyne, making his debut against Swindon Town on 25 September 1998. Achterberg then secured his place as Rovers' first choice goalkeeper after Coyne was transferred to Grimsby Town in 1999. Achterberg became part of the giant-killing cup teams that defeated such opponents as Everton, Southampton and other big teams. However after refusing to sign a new contract he was dropped by John Aldridge for the 2000 Football League Cup final and replaced by Joe Murphy. Achterberg's proficiency in goal was exemplified by the 20 clean sheets he kept during the 2003–04 season under the stewardship of Brian Little. One of his more memorable performances was against Millwall in an FA Cup quarter final at The New Den which was televised on BBC 1. The game finished goalless, but was largely dominated by Millwall and Achterberg managed to save a penalty kick from Kevin Muscat, despite having to play through injury.

Achterberg's 2005–06 season was less successful. After spending most of the season sidelined with injuries, he was replaced by Steve Wilson and Dino Seremet, who was on loan from Luton Town. Achterberg's chances of re-establishing himself as Tranmere's first choice goalkeeper in 2006–07 were hampered by the signing and good form of veteran journeyman Gavin Ward. Later in the season, an injury to Ward gave Achterberg a chance, but a re-occurrence of his own injury problems saw him sit out the closing months of the season.

Achterberg's contract expired in May 2007 and he was released by Tranmere on 25 May. This resulted in uproar from many Tranmere fans, who believed that Achterberg deserved a testimonial match, despite him falling just short of the ten years' service usually required to earn a testimonial at a club. On 31 May, however, he was given a two-year coaching and player contract with Tranmere. Achterberg made his 300th Rovers appearance in the opening day game of the 2008–09 season against Swindon Town. Achterberg had his testimonial game in 2009 for Tranmere against an Everton XI.

== Coaching career ==
After retiring from playing in 2009 with Tranmere Rovers, Achterberg joined Liverpool in June 2009 as a goalkeeping coach of the reserve and academy goalkeepers before being promoted to first-team goalkeeping coach in summer 2011.

On 19 July 2018, Liverpool officially confirmed the signing of Serie A Goalkeeper of the Year Alisson, for a fee of £66.8 million (€72.5 million), making him the most expensive goalkeeper of all time, surpassing the transfers of Ederson (most expensive in pound sterling) and Gianluigi Buffon (most expensive in Euros). The record stood for only four weeks, when Chelsea signed Kepa Arrizabalaga for a reported £71.6 million (€80 million) from Athletic Bilbao.

In his first season under Achterberg, Alisson kept a total of 21 clean sheets in Premier League, and won the Golden Glove. By doing so he broke the record of former Liverpool goalkeeper Pepe Reina for the most clean sheets by any Premier League goalkeeper in their debut season. In the Champions League knockout stages, meanwhile, Alisson played a starring role as Liverpool advanced to their second consecutive final in the competition; in their second-leg semi-final at home to Barcelona, he made a number of impressive saves as Liverpool overturned a 3–0 first leg deficit to advance past their opponents with a 4–0 home win. In the final on 1 June 2019, Alisson kept a clean sheet for Liverpool as they defeated Tottenham Hotspur 2–0, making eight saves in the process, as Achterberg won his second trophy with the club.

Earlier in the season, Alisson praised Achterberg in a post on Liverpool's official website. He said, “John has proved to be not just a great goalkeeping coach but a great guy, a great person. Since I arrived I’ve noticed he’s loved by all here. He leaves me very calm and relaxed on a day-to-day basis and we learn from each other’s work. I’ve pointed out some areas that contribute to his work and likewise he has helped me with things I can improve in on the pitch."

On 16 May 2021, Alisson scored a dramatic late winner in a 2–1 victory against West Bromwich Albion, making him the sixth goalkeeper to do so in the Premier League. With Liverpool chasing a spot in the top four and the score tied at 1–1, Achterberg yelled at Alisson to come up for a Liverpool corner in the 95th minute. The corner, taken by Trent Alexander-Arnold, found Alisson who managed to score with a header, the first goal scored by a keeper in a competitive match in Liverpool's 129-year history.

On 1 May 2024, it was reported that Achterberg was set to leave the club, after 15 years at Liverpool. This follows his contract expiring at the end of the season, as well as his intention to embark of a new challenge following the expected departure of manager Jurgen Klopp. On 17 May 2024, Klopp announced during his final press conference that Achterberg is set to join Saudi Pro League side Al-Ettifaq as part of the coaching staff led by manager and former Liverpool captain Steven Gerrard. Al-Ettifaq confirmed his arrival to the club on 16 June 2024.

== Honours ==
Tranmere Rovers

- Football League Cup runner-up: 1999–2000
