= Paul McLaren =

British association football player

Personal information
- Full name: Paul Andrew McLaren
- Date of birth: 17 November 1976 (age 50)
- Place of birth: High Wycombe, England
- Position: Midfielder

Senior career*
Years	Team	Apps	(Gls)
1994–2001	Luton Town	166	(4)
2001–2004	Sheffield Wednesday	97	(8)
2004–2006	Rotherham United	72	(4)
2006–2008	Tranmere Rovers	85	(5)
2008–2009	Bradford City	34	(3)
2009–2010	Tranmere Rovers	44	(0)
2010–2012	Oxford United	42	(2)
Total		540	(26)
- * Club domestic league appearances and goals

Paul Andrew McLaren (born 17 November 1976) is an English former professional footballer who last played for Oxford United in 2012. He was born in High Wycombe.

== Career ==
He began his career as a trainee for Luton Town, playing over 160 games over eight seasons. He left Luton to step up a Division for Sheffield Wednesday where he played 96 games and scored six goals. He turned down a contract offer, however, by Chris Turner after the club's relegation and subsequent failure to gain promotion to The Championship. He played for Rotherham United under Ronnie Moore and in the 2006–07 close season signed a two-year contract for Moore's new club Tranmere Rovers having left Rotherham. In his debut season at the centre of the Rovers midfield McLaren started 42 of Tranmere's 46 games in League One, and a further 43 the following season and being named Player of the year.

McLaren is a central midfielder, with an excellent assist record—13 during the 2007–08 season—mainly due to his passing and set piece ability.

He turned down a new contract offer from Tranmere and instead, on 1 July 2008, signed a two-year deal with League Two club Bradford City. He was one of four Bradford players to make his debut on the opening day of the 2008–09 season against Notts County, which Bradford won 2–1. His first goal for his new club came on 30 August 2008, with the opening goal in a 3–2 defeat to Aldershot Town. He was a regular in the Bradford side but missed a month of the season during February and March because of a calf injury, before leaving at the end of the season.

On 10 July 2009 McLaren rejoined Tranmere on a two-year contract. He scored his first Tranmere goal upon his return when he scored at home to Grimsby in a first-round League Cup tie on 11 August 2009. On 26 November 2010, McLaren decided to leave Tranmere Rovers as he wasn't enjoying the type of football they were playing. A little over a month later, on 31 December 2010, he joined Oxford United until the end of the 2010–11 season. In May 2012, McLaren left the club and rejoined his family in Cheshire.

== Career statistics ==
Appearances and goals by club, season and competition
Club	Season	League			FA Cup		League Cup		Other		Total	
Club	Season	Division	Apps	Goals	Apps	Goals	Apps	Goals	Apps	Goals	Apps	Goals
Luton Town	1995–96	Second Division	12	1	4	0	0	0	0	0	16	1
Luton Town	1996–97	Second Division	24	0	0	0	1	0	1 (Note: Appearance(s) in Division Two Play-offs)	0	26	0
Luton Town	1997–98	Second Division	43	0	1	0	2	0	2 (Note: Appearance(s) in Football League Trophy)	0	48	0
Luton Town	1998–99	Second Division	23	0	2	0	3	1	1	0	29	1
Luton Town	1999–2000	Second Division	29	1	4	0	1	0	0	0	34	1
Luton Town	2000–01	Second Division	35	2	3	1	4	0	1	0	43	3
Luton Town	Total		166	4	14	1	11	1	5		196	6
Sheffield Wednesday	2001–02	First Division	36	2	1	0	5	1	0	0	42	3
Sheffield Wednesday	2002–03	First Division	36	4	0	0	1	0	0	0	37	4
Sheffield Wednesday	2003–04	Second Division	25	2	1	0	0	0	1	0	27	2
Sheffield Wednesday	Total		97	8	2	0	6	1	1		106	9
Rotherham United	2004–05	Championship	33	1	1	0	0	0	0	0	34	1
Rotherham United	2005–06	League One	39	3	1	2	1	0	1	0	42	5
Rotherham United	Total		72	4	2	2	1	0	1		76	6
Tranmere Rovers	2006–07	League One	42	1	2	0	0	0	0	0	44	1
Tranmere Rovers	2007–08	League One	43	4	4	0	1	0	0	0	48	4
Tranmere Rovers	Total		85	5	6	0	1	0	0		92	5
Bradford City	2008–09	League Two	34	3	1	0	1	0	1	0	37	3
Tranmere Rovers	2009–10	League One	38	0	3	0	2	1	0	0	43	1
Tranmere Rovers	2010–11	League One	6	0	0	0	2	0	0	0	8	0
Tranmere Rovers	Total		44	0	3	0	4	1	0		51	1
Oxford United	2010–11	League Two	24	1	0	0	0	0	0	0	24	1
Oxford United	2011–12	League Two	18	1	1	0	0	0	2	0	21	1
Oxford United	Total		42	2	1	0	0	0	2		45	2
Career total			540	26	29	3	24	3	10	0	603	32
