= Olly Lancashire =

English footballer (born 1988)

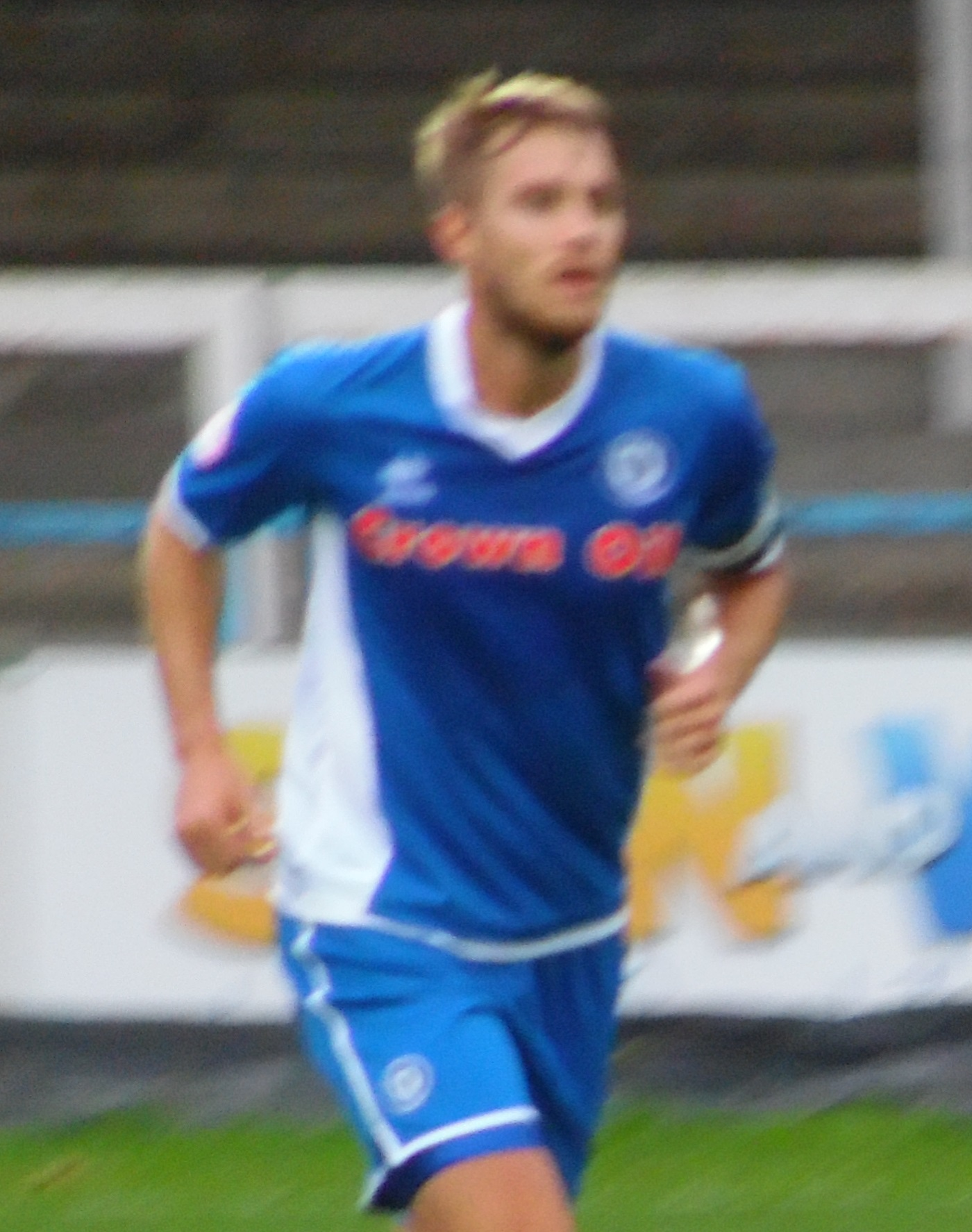
- Lancashire playing for Rochdale in 2015

Personal information
- Full name: Oliver James Lancashire
- Date of birth: 13 December 1988 (age 37)
- Place of birth: Basingstoke, England
- Height: 6 ft 1 in (1.85 m)
- Position: Centre back

Team information
- Current team: Southampton (Head of Player Strategy)

Youth career
- ?–2006: Crystal Palace
- 2006–2007: Southampton

Senior career*
Years	Team	Apps	(Gls)
2007–2010	Southampton	13	(0)
2009	→ Grimsby Town (loan)	8	(0)
2009	→ Grimsby Town (loan)	1	(0)
2010	→ Grimsby Town (loan)	16	(1)
2010–2012	Walsall	49	(1)
2012–2013	Aldershot Town	12	(0)
2013–2016	Rochdale	93	(2)
2016–2017	Shrewsbury Town	16	(1)
2017–2019	Swindon Town	55	(1)
2019–2021	Crewe Alexandra	31	(1)
2021–2024	Southampton	0	(0)
Total		294	(7)

International career
2007	England U19	2	(0)
- * Club domestic league appearances and goals

Oliver James Lancashire (born 13 December 1988) is an English former professional footballer who played as a centre back. He is Head of Player Strategy at EFL Championship club Southampton.

Lancashire began his career as a youth player for Crystal Palace before joining Southampton's academy. He captained Southampton's under-18 side and turned professional in July 2006, making his senior debut in 2008. Lancashire had three loan spells at Grimsby Town in 2009/10 and, following his release by Southampton, joined Walsall in July 2010. He made 58 appearances for Walsall, but was released in the summer of 2012 and subsequently went to Aldershot Town. In July 2013, Lancashire made a permanent transfer to then-League Two side Rochdale. He went on to play a season for Shrewsbury Town, followed by two for Swindon Town, before joining Crewe Alexandra in May 2019. He rejoined Southampton in July 2021 as a supporting player for the B team programme.

== Early life ==
Lancashire was born in Basingstoke, Hampshire, on 13 December 1988. He attended Hook Junior School and Robert May's School in Odiham. Lancashire began his career with Southampton, where he signed a two-year contract. Lancashire was linked with moves to the Premiership with Manchester City and Liverpool.

== Club career ==
=== Southampton ===
Lancashire made his first-team debut against Queens Park Rangers on 14 September 2008, but was sent off after 29 minutes, for a rash tackle on Damien Delaney. After a two match ban, Lancashire made his return and helped the club keep two clean sheets in a row, in wins against Doncaster Rovers and Norwich City. But several weeks later, on 21 October 2008, Lancashire, once again, received a red card after a second bookable offence, in a 0–0 draw against Sheffield United. While at Southampton, he never became a first team regular, looking out of his depth. Upon joining Walsall, Lancashire explained his discipline issue.

On 15 May 2010, Lancashire was named in a list of 13 players to be released from Southampton before the start of the 2010–11 season.

==== Grimsby Town (loan spells) ====
In October 2009, Lancashire signed on a one-month loan for Grimsby Town. In his second game for Town, against Accrington Stanley, on 30 October 2009, Lancashire received his third career red card, in only 15 league matches, after he was adjudged to have handled the ball in the penalty area. In his next appearance for Grimsby, he scored an own goal whilst playing against Leeds United in the Football League Trophy quarter final away at Elland Road on 10 November 2009.

Lancashire returned for a second spell on loan at Grimsby on 23 December 2009, only to be recalled on 31 December due to an injury crisis at his parent club.

On transfer deadline day 1 February 2010, Lancashire joined Grimsby for a third time, until the end of the season. He scored his first professional goal in a 2–0 win over Darlington on 24 April 2010. However, towards the end of the season, Grimsby Town were relegated from the Football League for the first time in nearly 100 years. After the relegation, he said his difficult spell at the club had made him a better player.

=== Walsall ===
On 14 July 2010, Lancashire joined Walsall, where manager Chris Hutchings said "He has shown plenty of promise and we have had some good reports on him. He will add competition to the central defensive positions."

Lancashire made his debut for the club, in the opening game of the season, coming on as a late substitute, in a 2–1 loss against Milton Keynes Dons. He made 29 appearances during the season. The club avoided relegation, but Lancashire was one of many players criticised by Hutchings for poor displays during the season. He later described the relegation survival as "definitely the biggest day of my career".

In the 2011–12 season, Lancashire made 20 appearances as the club again avoided relegation. In mid-December, he suffered a hamstring injury, recovering after a month out, and making his return on 15 February 2012, in a 2–1 defeat against Oldham Athletic. On 3 March 2012, Lancashire scored his first Walsall goal, an injury time equaliser, as Walsall drew 1–1 against Leyton Orient.

On 9 May 2012, it was announced that Lancashire had been released by Walsall.

=== Aldershot Town ===
On 14 June 2012, Lancashire signed with League Two side Aldershot Town on a two-year deal, following his release from Walsall. His time with Aldershot was hampered by injury; he made 15 appearances (12 league and three cup games). After one season with Aldershot Town, resulting in the club's relegation, Lancashire was among 13 players made redundant, after the club went into administration.

=== Rochdale ===
On 14 June 2013, Lancashire signed a one-year contract with Rochdale. He was given number six shirt and made his debut in the opening game of the season, in a 3–0 win over Hartlepool United. Lancashire quickly established himself as part of the team's first choice centre back pairing, along with on-loan Jack O'Connell. Due to the absence of first team captain Peter Cavanagh as a result of injury and suspension, he was handed the captain's armband.

After his debut, he appeared in 18 consecutive games until he was sent-off in a 4–0 loss against Scunthorpe United on 28 November 2013; this resulted a one-match ban. Lancashire was sent-off for the second time that season on 11 March 2014, in a 2–1 loss against League Two strugglers Torquay United. Having led Rochdale towards promotion to League One, Lancashire wrote to the club's supporters about the promotion.

On 27 June 2014, Lancashire signed a one-year extension with Rochdale.

At the start of the 2014–15 season, on 5 August 2014, Lancashire was named Rochdale captain after the departure of Peter Cavanagh. He started in the opening game of the season, in a 1–0 defeat against Peterborough United, but sustained a groin injury that was expected to keep him out for four to six weeks. Unexpectedly, Lancashire managed to recover from the injury and returned to training, but remained on the bench until coming on as substitute for Jamie Allen in the 33rd minute of a 3–2 win over Leyton Orient on 27 September 2014. Following his return, Lancashire retained his first team place, captaining the side in a FA Cup first round 0–0 draw against Northampton Town. In the replay, Lancashire scored in the last minute to send Rochdale through to the next round. Throughout the 2014–15 season, Lancashire continued to be injury-plagued making 28 appearances in all competitions.

=== Shrewsbury Town ===
On 20 May 2016, Lancashire signed a two-year deal at Shrewsbury Town after rejecting a new deal at Rochdale. He scored his first goal for Shrewsbury in a 3–2 loss at former club Walsall on 15 October 2016.

=== Swindon Town ===
On 28 June 2017, Lancashire joined League Two side Swindon Town on a two-year deal after terminating his contract with Shrewsbury. He scored his first goal for Swindon in a 3–2 EFL Cup defeat at Norwich City on 8 August 2017.

He was released by Swindon at the end of the 2018–19 season.

=== Crewe Alexandra ===
On 30 May 2019, he signed for Crewe Alexandra on a two-year contract. He scored his first Crewe goal on 19 January 2021 in a 3–2 win over Bristol Rovers. On 13 May 2021, Crewe announced that Lancashire was being released by the club.

== Coaching career ==
On 31 August 2021, Lancashire re-signed for Southampton in a support player role that will see him play and train with the club's B team and under-23 side in order to help progress the players mentally and set a standard of good behaviour. In February 2024, he moved into a Head of Player Strategy role.

== International career ==
Lancashire made two appearances for the England under-19 side in 2007, playing in friendly matches.

== Career statistics ==
Appearances and goals by club, season and competition
Club	Season	League			FA Cup		League Cup		Other		Total	
Club	Season	Division	Apps	Goals	Apps	Goals	Apps	Goals	Apps	Goals	Apps	Goals
Southampton	2008–09	Championship	11	0	1	0	0	0	—		12	0
Southampton	2009–10	League One	2	0	2	0	1	0	0	0	5	0
Southampton	Total		13	0	3	0	1	0	0	0	17	0
Grimsby Town (loan)	2009–10	League Two	25	1	0	0	0	0	1 (Note: Appearance(s) in Football League Trophy)	0	26	1
Walsall	2010–11	League One	29	0	3	0	1	0	1	0	34	0
Walsall	2011–12	League One	20	1	3	0	1	0	0	0	24	1
Walsall	Total		49	1	6	0	2	0	1	0	58	1
Aldershot Town	2012–13	League Two	12	0	0	0	1	0	2	0	15	0
Rochdale	2013–14	League Two	38	0	3	0	1	0	2	0	44	0
Rochdale	2014–15	League One	21	0	6	1	1	0	0	0	28	1
Rochdale	2015–16	League One	34	2	1	0	1	0	0	0	36	2
Rochdale	Total		93	2	10	1	3	0	2	0	108	3
Shrewsbury Town	2016–17	League One	16	1	1	0	1	0	3 (Note: Appearance(s) in EFL Trophy)	0	21	1
Swindon Town	2017–18	League Two	35	1	2	0	1	1	3	0	41	2
Swindon Town	2018–19	League Two	20	0	1	0	1	0	0	0	22	0
Swindon Town	Total		55	1	3	0	2	1	3	0	63	2
Crewe Alexandra	2019–20	League Two	9	0	0	0	2	0	0	0	11	0
Crewe Alexandra	2020–21	League One	22	1	1	0	1	0	2	0	26	1
Crewe Alexandra	Total		31	1	1	0	3	0	2	0	37	1
Southampton U-23s	2021–22	—			—		—		3	1	3	1
Southampton U-23s	2022–23	—			—		—		3	1	3	1
Southampton U-23s	Total		—		—		—		6	2	6	2
Career total			294	7	24	1	13	1	20	2	351	11
