= Johny Diba =

Congolese-born English footballer

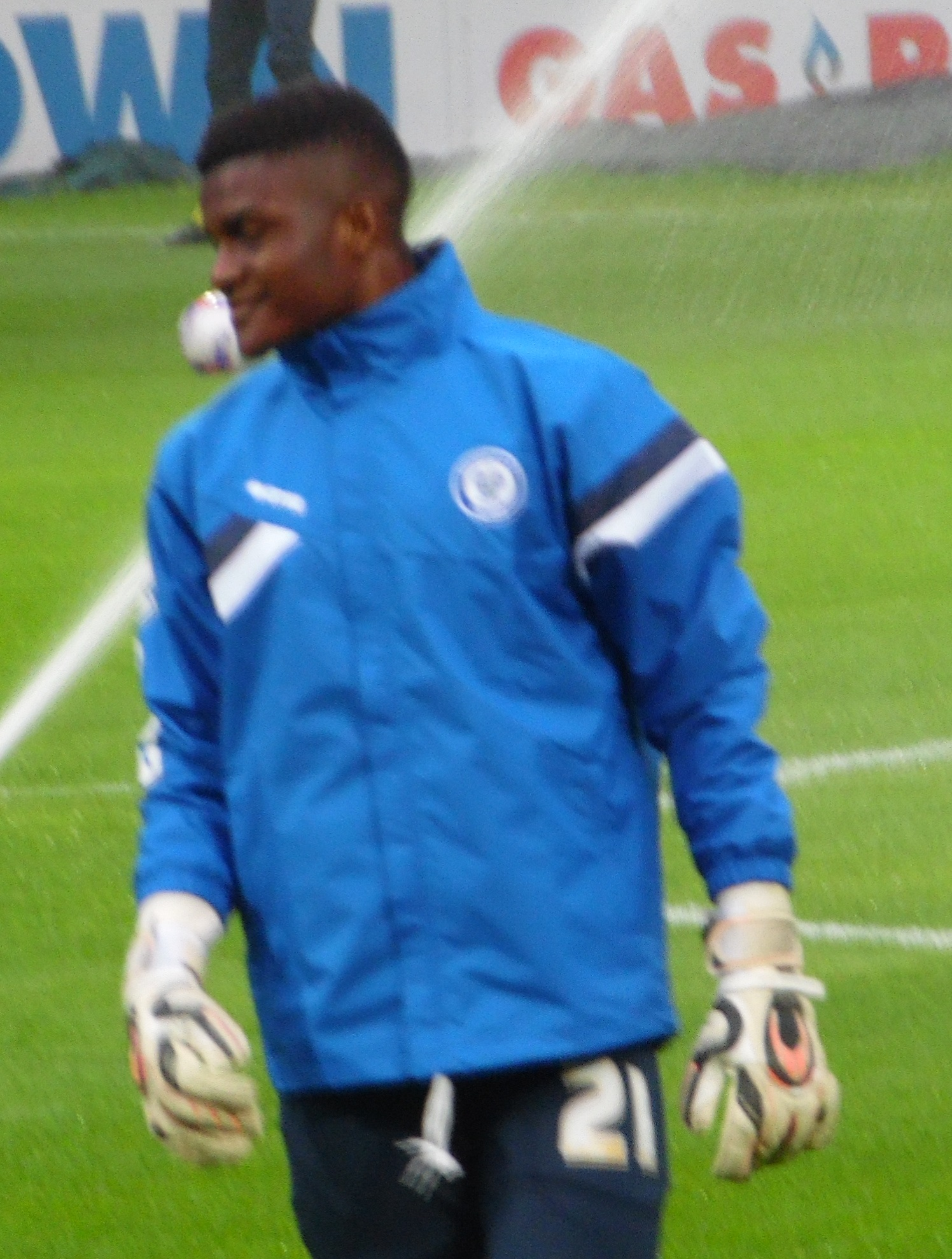
- Diba training with Rochdale in 2015

Personal information
- Full name: Jonathan Diba Musangu
- Date of birth: 12 October 1997 (age 29)
- Place of birth: Mbuji-Mayi, DR Congo
- Position: Goalkeeper

Youth career
- 2009–2014: Rochdale

Senior career*
Years	Team	Apps	(Gls)
2014–2017	Rochdale	1	(0)
2016	→ FC United of Manchester (loan)	5	(0)
2017	→ Glossop North End (loan)	5	(0)
2017–2018	Ashton United	1	(0)
2018–2019	Mossley	23	(0)
Total		35	(0)
- * Club domestic league appearances and goals

Jonathan "Johny" Diba Musangu (born 12 October 1997) is a Congolese-British convicted sex offender and former professional footballer. He played as a goalkeeper.

== Early life ==
Diba was born on 12 October 1997 in the Democratic Republic of the Congo and moved to Rochdale in England at a young age. He attended St Cuthbert's RC High School with whom he reached the final of the English National Schools Cup as a Year 7 in 2009 with a team that also included Connor Ronan, Kisimba Kisimba and Axel Tuanzebe, who all went on to turn professional.

== Club career ==
Diba joined the youth set up of his local side Rochdale at the age of 11. Diba was promoted to the first team squad at the start of the 2014–15 season, attending preseason training in Tenerife less than a month after completing his GCSEs. He made his debut for Rochdale at the age of 16 on 16 August 2014, replacing an injured Josh Lillis 60 minutes into a League One match with Chesterfield at the Proact Stadium. Diba received a yellow card for handling outside of the penalty area and conceded one goal from the penalty spot in what ended as a 2–1 defeat.

In August 2014, it was reported by the Daily Star that both Arsenal and Chelsea were interested in signing Diba. Arsenal scouted Diba in Rochdale's pre-season friendly against AFC Fylde later that month.

Diba signed his first professional contract on 18 November 2014. In the same month, Rochdale manager Keith Hill tipped Diba as a future Championship player along with his teammates Jamie Allen and Scott Tanser.

On 2 September 2016, Diba joined National League North side FC United of Manchester on a one-month loan. Diba made his debut for the club in a 0–0 draw against Curzon Ashton. Diba made five appearances for the club. On 1 April 2017, Diba joined NPL Division One North side Glossop North End on loan.

Diba was released by Rochdale at the end of the 2016–17 season following the expiration of his contract.

In September 2017, he joined Ashton United on the same day as fellow goalkeeper Ashley Frith.

In January 2018, Diba joined his last club Mossley. Diba played 23 times for Mossley.

== International career ==
In the 2011–12 season Diba attended two England U15 training camps. In November 2012 Diba was called up to a two-day England under-16 goalkeeper training camp at St George's Park National Football Centre. In 2014, Rochdale manager Keith Hill said to the local press that Diba should be considered for the England under-18 side.

== Sexual offences and criminal activity ==
In June 2021, Diba pleaded not guilty to three counts of raping a child under 13, three counts of rape, two counts of sexually assaulting a child under 13, two counts of inciting a child to engage in sexual activity, and three counts of sexual activity with a child. Diba did, however, plead guilty to a further charge of inciting a child to engage in sexual activity.

Following a four-week trial, Diba was found guilty of raping and sexually abusing six girls and a woman over a five-year period. Upon being found guilty, Diba fell to his knees and cried loudly. The hearing had to be paused whilst court staff carried him from the room. On 24 September 2021, Diba was jailed for 24 years with an extended licence period of four years.

== Career statistics ==
As of match played 23 April 2017.

Club	Season	League			FA Cup		League Cup		Other		Total	
Club	Season	Division	Apps	Goals	Apps	Goals	Apps	Goals	Apps	Goals	Apps	Goals
Rochdale	2014–15	League One	1	0	0	0	0	0	0	0	1	0
Rochdale	2015–16	League One	0	0	0	0	0	0	0	0	0	0
Rochdale	2016–17	League One	0	0	0	0	0	0	0	0	0	0
Rochdale	Total		1	0	0	0	0	0	0	0	1	0
FC United of Manchester (loan)	2016–17	National League North	5	0	0	0	—		0	0	5	0
Glossop North End (loan)	2016–17	Northern Premier League	5	0	0	0	—		0	0	5	0
Career total			11	0	0	0	0	0	0	0	11	0
