= Reuben Noble-Lazarus =

English-born Grenadian footballer (born 1993)

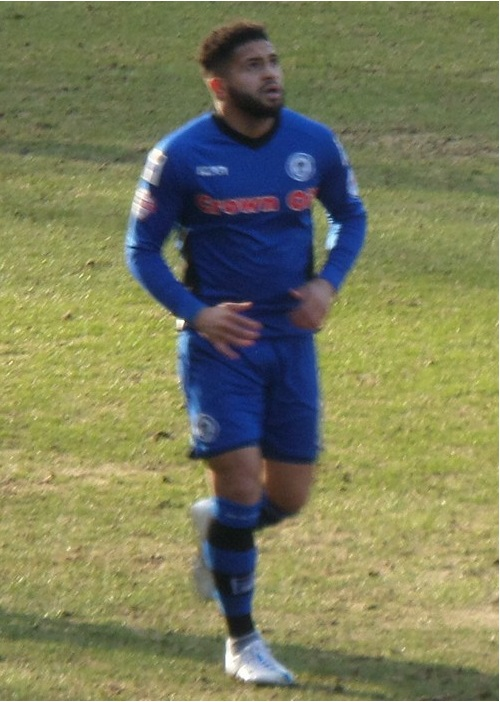
- Noble-Lazarus playing for Rochdale in 2015

Personal information
- Full name: Reuben Courtney Noble-Lazarus
- Date of birth: 16 August 1993 (age 33)
- Place of birth: Huddersfield, England
- Height: 5 ft 11 in (1.80 m)
- Position: Winger

Youth career
- –2008: Barnsley

Senior career*
Years	Team	Apps	(Gls)
2008–2015	Barnsley	46	(3)
2013–2014	→ Scunthorpe United (loan)	4	(0)
2014–2015	→ Rochdale (loan)	5	(1)
2015–2017	Rochdale	34	(2)
2018	Chorley	0	(0)
2020	Golcar United	2	(2)
2020–2021	FC Halifax Town	0	(0)
- * Club domestic league appearances and goals as of 08:45, 28 February 2020 (UTC)

Reuben Courtney Noble-Lazarus (born 16 August 1993) is an English-born Grenadian professional footballer. On 30 September 2008, he became the youngest player to debut in the English Football League, at 15 years and 45 days old, breaking the record previously established by Albert Geldard in 1929.

In the 2013–14 season, Noble-Lazarus spent time on loan at Scunthorpe United from Barnsley. In 2014, Noble-Lazarus moved to Rochdale on loan until January 2015, but made a permanent transfer to them at the end of his loan spell for an undisclosed fee.

== Club career ==
=== Barnsley ===
Noble-Lazarus was born in Huddersfield, West Yorkshire. He came on as a substitute during Barnsley's 3–0 Championship defeat by Ipswich Town in October 2008 aged 15 years and 45 days.

The previous weekend, Noble-Lazarus had scored a hat-trick for the Barnsley under-18 team, for whom he had played since he was 12 years old, and was selected as a substitute for the senior team's visit to Portman Road. Coming on in the 84th minute of the match to replace Martin Devaney, Noble-Lazarus surpassed the record of the youngest player in the Football League set by Bradford Park Avenue's Albert Geldard in September 1929, and equalled by Welshman Ken Roberts for Wrexham in 1951, by 113 days. He was too young to be paid for his appearance – Barnsley manager Simon Davey joked he would be given pizza and a ham sandwich for his efforts – and was due to return to Newsome High School in Huddersfield the following day.

Davey had wanted to play Noble-Lazarus in the League Cup earlier in the season but was prevented from doing so by the competition's rules, which prohibit the selection of players under the age of 15. The club has made an agreement with Noble-Lazarus' school to allow him to train with the club for two days each week. Davey said that the club would "nurture" Noble-Lazarus by ensuring that he is "...dipped in and dipped back out..." of the team. Noble-Lazarus was included in Barnsley's squad to face Doncaster Rovers the weekend after his debut, making another substitute appearance when he came on for Iain Hume in the 87th minute.

Under new boss Mark Robins, Noble-Lazarus was used twice as a substitute towards the end of the 2009/10 season. As a result, Noble-Lazarus attracted interests from clubs in the Premier League, such as, Aston Villa and Manchester United, which he went on to have trial at.

In the 2010–11 season, Noble-Lazarus continued to develop at Barnsley and made his first appearance of the season, coming on as a late substitute for goalscorer Jacob Mellis, in a 4–1 loss against Leicester City on 5 February 2011. He then made his first senior start against Doncaster Rovers in a 2–2 draw on 25 April 2011, and scored his first senior goal as a substitute against Millwall on the last day of the 2010/11 season. At the end of the 2010/11 season, Noble-Lazarus signed a contract extension with the club, signing a two-year deal.

The 2011–12 season saw Noble-Lazarus making his first appearance of the season, playing 22 minutes as a substitute, in a 1–0 loss against Southampton on 13 August 2011. However, he suffered ankle injury that kept him out for months. Although he was making good progress of recovering from ankle injury, it wasn't until on 2 January 2012 for Noble-Lazarus to make his first appearance since August, playing 37 minutes as a substitute, in a 2–0 loss against Doncaster Rovers. He finished the 2011–12 season, making 9 appearances in all competition.

At the start of the 2012–13 season, Noble-Lazarus was sidelined for two months, due to suffering from an injury. After returning from an injury, he made his first appearance of the season, where he played for 22 minutes as a substitute, in a 1–0 loss against Huddersfield Town on 11 November 2012. Noble-Lazarus then scored his first Barnsley goal of the season, in a 2–2 draw against Leicester City on 8 December 2012. Despite suffering from injuries, Noble-Lazarus signed a two-year contract with the club, keeping him until 2015 and finished the season, making 15 appearances and scoring once in all competitions.

With a handful of first team appearances at Barnsley and had his first team opportunities limited, Noble-Lazarus made his return to the first team at the club, where he played 13 minutes as a substitute, in a 2–0 win over Blackpool on 18 January 2014 and then scored his first goal two months later on 25 March 2014, in a 3–1 win over Reading. After the club were relegated to the League One, he finished the 2013–14 season, making 12 appearances and scoring once for the club.

==== Loan to Scunthorpe United ====
After being told by the Barnsley management that he would be loaned out, it was announced on 12 November 2013 that Noble-Lazarus signed on loan at League Two side Scunthorpe United until 1 January 2014.

Noble-Lazarus made his Scunthorpe United debut on 16 November 2013, where he played 45 minutes, in a 2–0 loss against Accrington Stanley. Having made four appearances, he, however, suffered a groin injury in December. Because he suffered a groin injury, the club decided against cancelling Noble-Lazarus's loan spell at Scunthorpe United. and returned to his parent club on 1 January 2014.

=== Rochdale ===
Despite given a chance ahead of the new season, Noble-Lazarus ended up making two appearances in all competitions, which both come from a league and League Cup, it was announced on 27 October 2014, Noble-Lazarus joined Rochdale on loan until January 2015.

Noble-Lazarus made his Rochdale debut on 15 November 2014, where he played for 22 minutes after coming on as a substitute, in a 1–0 loss against Port Vale on 15 November 2014. Three days later on 18 November 2014, he scored his first Rochdale goal, in the first round replay of FA Cup, in a 2–1 win over Northampton Town. Four days later, on 22 November 2014, he scored again, in a 2–2 draw against MK Dons. On 13 January 2015, Noble-Lazarus completed a permanent switch to the club, signing an 18-month deal. He went on to make twenty-three appearances and scoring once in all competition despite spending frequently on the substitute bench.

The 2015–16 season saw Noble-Lazarus starting well when he scored in the opening game of the season, in a 2–0 win over Peterborough United. He continued to make a handful appearance in the first team until he dislocated his shoulder in training that kept him out sidelined for months. After making his return to training in late-December, Noble-Lazarus made his first team return on 16 February 2016, where he played 31 minutes after coming on as a substitute, in a 2–2 draw against Crewe Alexandra. However, he once again suffered a hip problem. and despite returning to training, he never played again, making 10 appearances this season. At the end of the 2015–16 season, Noble-Lazarus was among eight players to be released by the club.

However, on 14 July 2016, Noble-Lazarus re-signed for Rochdale for the second time, signing a one-year contract with the club. Ahead of the 2016–17 season, his 11 shirt number was given to Nathaniel Mendez-Laing and wore number 16 shirt instead. Unfortunately for Noble-Lazarus, he missed the start of the season, with an injury After a month sidelined, Noble-Lazarus made his return to training.

=== Chorley ===
In October 2018, Noble-Lazarus joined National League North club Chorley, following an achilles injury. In December 2018, Noble-Lazarus was released by Chorley.

=== Golcar United ===
In February 2020 Noble-Lazarus joined Golcar United in Division One North of the North West Counties Football League.

=== FC Halifax Town ===
On 19 August 2020, Noble-Lazarus signed for FC Halifax Town. He was released after the 2020–21 season.

== International career ==
Noble-Lazarus, who is of Grenadian descent, expressed his desire to play for Grenada and wished to be part of the team for the 2018 FIFA World Cup qualifiers against Puerto Rico in June 2015.

== Career statistics ==
As of match played 30 April 2017.

Appearances and goals by club, season and competition
Club	Season	League			FA Cup		League Cup		Other		Total	
Club	Season	Division	Apps	Goals	Apps	Goals	Apps	Goals	Apps	Goals	Apps	Goals
Barnsley	2008–09	Championship	2	0	0	0	0	0	—		2	0
Barnsley	2009–10	Championship	2	0	0	0	0	0	—		2	0
Barnsley	2010–11	Championship	7	1	0	0	0	0	—		7	1
Barnsley	2011–12	Championship	8	0	1	0	0	0	—		9	0
Barnsley	2012–13	Championship	14	1	1	0	0	0	—		15	1
Barnsley	2013–14	Championship	12	1	0	0	0	0	—		12	1
Barnsley	2014–15	League One	1	0	—		1	0	0	0	2	0
Barnsley	Total		46	3	2	0	1	0	0	0	49	3
Scunthorpe United (loan)	2013–14	League Two	4	0	—		—		—		4	0
Rochdale	2014–15	League One	19	1	2	1	—		—		21	2
Rochdale	2015–16	League One	10	1	0	0	2	0	1 (Note: Appearance(s) in EFL Trophy)	0	13	1
Rochdale	2016–17	League One	10	1	3	0	0	0	3	1	16	2
Rochdale	Total		39	3	5	1	2	0	4	1	50	5
Career total			89	6	7	1	3	0	4	1	103	8
