= Rhys Bennett (footballer, born 1991) =

English footballer (born 1991)

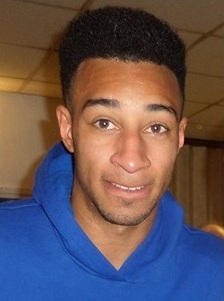
- Bennett in 2015

Personal information
- Full name: Rhys Gordon Bennett
- Date of birth: 1 September 1991 (age 35)
- Place of birth: Whitefield, England
- Height: 6 ft 3 in (1.91 m)
- Positions: Defender; defensive midfielder

Youth career
- Radcliffe Borough
- –2009: Bolton Wanderers

Senior career*
Years	Team	Apps	(Gls)
2009–2012	Bolton Wanderers	0	(0)
2011–2012	→ Falkirk (loan)	19	(0)
2012–2016	Rochdale	110	(6)
2016–2018	Mansfield Town	84	(4)
2018–2020	Peterborough United	50	(4)
2020–2021	Carlisle United	24	(5)
2021–2022	Gillingham	18	(0)
2022	Morecambe	12	(0)
2023	Rochdale	1	(0)
- * Club domestic league appearances and goals as of 11:58, 8 February 2023 (UTC)

Rhys Gordon Bennett (born 1 September 1991) is an English professional footballer who is currently without a club. He plays as a central defender, although he has also been deployed in defensive midfield, and as a full-back.

== Club career ==
=== Bolton Wanderers ===
Bennett started his professional career at Bolton Wanderers, regularly playing in the reserve side and wearing the captain's armband on occasions. Having not made an appearance for the first team he was sent out on loan to Falkirk in July 2011 by manager Owen Coyle.

==== Falkirk (loan) ====
On 6 July 2011, it was announced that Falkirk had signed Bennett on a six-month loan, which was extended until the end of the season on 9 January 2012.

Bennett made his debut on 23 July 2011, scoring a 26th-minute opener against Brechin City in the 1st round of the Scottish Challenge Cup. He made his league debut on 6 August 2011 in a 1–0 loss against Raith Rovers.

Bennett was an unused substitute when Falkirk defeated Hamilton Academical 1-0 in the 2012 Scottish Challenge Cup final.

=== Rochdale ===
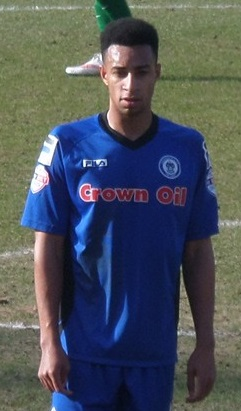
Bennett playing for Rochdale in 2015

On 11 June 2012, Rochdale announced that Bennett had signed a one-year contract at the club effective on 1 July 2012. He made his debut on 4 September in a 2–2 draw against Fleetwood Town in the Football League Trophy. The game went to a penalty shoot-out which Rochdale won 4–2 and progressed to the second round. He made his league debut on 15 September in a 2–1 win away to AFC Wimbledon.

He scored his first goal for the club on 1 December, in a 3–2 defeat to York City.

=== Mansfield Town ===
Bennett joined Mansfield Town on a free transfer in June 2016.

He was released by Mansfield at the end of the 2017–18 season.

=== Peterborough United ===
Bennett joined Peterborough United on a free transfer in May 2018. He followed in the footsteps of former Mansfield Town manager Steve Evans in the same season.

=== Carlisle United ===
On 12 November 2020, Bennett joined Carlisle United on a short-term deal until January 2021. On 5 January 2021, Bennett signed an extended deal to remain at the club until the end of the 2020–21 season. Bennett rejected a new offer from the Cumbrian club at the end of the season.

=== Gillingham ===
Bennett signed for EFL League One side Gillingham on 23 July 2021. He made his debut for the Gills on the opening day of the 2021–22 season in a 1–1 home draw to Lincoln City on 7 August 2021.

=== Morecambe ===
Having reached a mutual agreement with Gillingham to terminate his contract, Bennett signed for fellow EFL League One side Morecambe on 28 January 2022. He made his league debut for the Lancashire side the next day, appearing as a 28th minute substitute in a 2–2 away draw to Accrington Stanley. Bennett was released by the club at the end of the season.

=== Rochdale ===
On 28 January 2023, Bennett returned to Rochdale signing a contract till the end of the 2022–2023 season.

== Career statistics ==
As of match played 4 February 2023

Appearances and goals by club, season and competition
Club	Season	League			Cup		League Cup		Other		Total	
Club	Season	Division	Apps	Goals	Apps	Goals	Apps	Goals	Apps	Goals	Apps	Goals
Bolton Wanderers	2011–12	Premier League	0	0	0	0	0	0	0	0	0	0
Falkirk (loan)	2011–12	Scottish First Division	19	0	1	0	3	0	2 (Note: Appearances in Scottish Challenge Cup)	1	25	1
Rochdale	2012–13	League Two	33	2	2	0	0	0	2 (Note: Appearance(s) in Football League Trophy)	0	37	2
Rochdale	2013–14	League Two	22	0	3	0	0	0	0	0	25	0
Rochdale	2014–15	League One	39	2	5	1	1	0	1	0	46	3
Rochdale	2015–16	League One	16	2	2	0	1	0	2	0	21	2
Rochdale	Total		110	6	12	1	2	0	5	0	129	7
Mansfield Town	2016–17	League Two	46	2	1	0	1	0	6 (Note: Appearance(s) in EFL Trophy)	0	54	2
Mansfield Town	2017–18	League Two	38	2	3	0	1	0	1	0	43	2
Mansfield Town	Total		84	4	4	0	2	0	7	0	97	4
Peterborough United	2018–19	League One	37	4	3	0	1	0	4	0	45	4
Peterborough United	2019–20	League One	13	0	1	0	0	0	4	0	18	0
Peterborough United	Total		50	4	4	0	1	0	8	0	63	4
Carlisle United	2020–21	League Two	24	5	1	0	0	0	1	0	26	5
Gillingham	2021–22	League One	18	0	1	0	2	0	2	0	23	0
Morecambe	2021–22	League One	12	0	0	0	0	0	0	0	12	0
Rochdale	2022–23	League Two	1	0	0	0	0	0	0	0	1	0
Career total			318	19	23	1	10	0	25	1	376	21

== Honours ==
Falkirk

- Scottish Challenge Cup: 2011–12
