= 2013–14 Rochdale A.F.C. season =

English football club season

Rochdale A.F.C.
2013–14 season
- Chairman: Chris Dunphy
- Manager: Keith Hill
- Stadium: Spotland Stadium
- Football League Two: 3rd (promoted)
- FA Cup: Fourth round
- Football League Cup: First round
- Football League Trophy: Second round
- Top goalscorer: League: Scott Hogan (17 goals); All: Scott Hogan (19 goals)
Home colours	Away colours	Third colours

The 2013–14 season was Rochdale A.F.C.'s 107th in existence and their second consecutive season in League Two.

== League table ==
Pos	Team	Pld	W	D	L	GF	GA	GD	Pts	Promotion, qualification or relegation
1	Chesterfield (C, P)	46	23	15	8	71	40	+31	84	Promotion to Football League One
2	Scunthorpe United (P)	46	20	21	5	68	44	+24	81	Promotion to Football League One
3	Rochdale (P)	46	24	9	13	69	48	+21	81	Promotion to Football League One
4	Fleetwood Town (O, P)	46	22	10	14	66	52	+14	76	Qualification for League Two play-offs
5	Southend United	46	19	15	12	56	39	+17	72	Qualification for League Two play-offs

Updated to match(es) played on 3 May 2014. Source: BBC Sport
Rules for classification: 1) Points; 2) Goal difference; 3) Number of goals scored
(C) Champions; (O) Play-off winners; (P) Promoted

== Statistics ==
No.	Pos	Nat	Player	Total		League Two		FA Cup		League Cup		League Trophy	
No.	Pos	Nat	Player	Apps	Goals	Apps	Goals	Apps	Goals	Apps	Goals	Apps	Goals
1	GK	(England) ENG	Josh Lillis	52	0	45 + 0	0	4 + 0	0	1 + 0	0	2 + 0	0
2	DF	(Republic of Ireland) IRL	Joe Rafferty	34	1	31 + 0	0	1 + 0	0	1 + 0	0	1 + 0	1
3	DF	(England) ENG	Rhys Bennett	25	0	18 + 4	0	3 + 0	0	0 + 0	0	0 + 0	0
4	MF	(England) ENG	Peter Cavanagh	21	1	17 + 3	1	1 + 0	0	0 + 0	0	0 + 0	0
5	DF	(England) ENG	Ashley Eastham	20	0	15 + 0	0	3 + 0	0	1 + 0	0	1 + 0	0
6	DF	(England) ENG	Olly Lancashire	44	0	38 + 0	0	3 + 0	0	1 + 0	0	2 + 0	0
7	MF	(England) ENG	Peter Vincenti	49	7	31 + 11	5	3 + 1	2	1 + 0	0	2 + 0	0
8	MF	(England) ENG	Jason Kennedy	7	0	4 + 3	0	0 + 0	0	0 + 0	0	0 + 0	0
8	MF	(England) ENG	Andrew Tutte	14	2	7 + 4	2	1 + 0	0	1 + 0	0	1 + 0	0
9	FW	(England) ENG	George Donnelly	34	5	16 + 16	5	0 + 1	0	0 + 1	0	0 + 0	0
10	MF	(England) ENG	Reece Gray	3	0	0 + 3	0	0 + 0	0	0 + 0	0	0 + 0	0
11	FW	(Republic of Ireland) IRL	Scott Hogan	40	19	29 + 4	17	4 + 0	2	1 + 0	0	1 + 1	0
12	MF	(Northern Ireland) NIR	Matthew Lund	45	9	40 + 0	8	4 + 0	1	1 + 0	0	0 + 0	0
14	MF	(France) FRA	Bastien Héry	14	1	4 + 8	1	0 + 0	0	1 + 0	0	1 + 0	0
15	FW	(England) ENG	George Porter	2	0	1 + 1	0	0 + 0	0	0 + 0	0	0 + 0	0
15	DF	(England) ENG	Javan Vidal	3	0	2 + 0	0	0 + 0	0	0 + 0	0	1 + 0	0
16	FW	(Wales) WAL	Matt Done	44	0	25 + 13	0	3 + 1	0	1 + 0	0	1 + 0	0
17	DF	(England) ENG	Scott Tanser	0	0	0 + 0	0	0 + 0	0	0 + 0	0	0 + 0	0
19	FW	(England) ENG	Craig Lynch	1	0	0 + 1	0	0 + 0	0	0 + 0	0	0 + 0	0
19	DF	(England) ENG	Lee Molyneux	3	0	0 + 3	0	0 + 0	0	0 + 0	0	0 + 0	0
20	MF	(Republic of Ireland) IRL	Brian Barry-Murphy	3	0	3 + 0	0	0 + 0	0	0 + 0	0	0 + 0	0
21	GK	(Scotland) SCO	Robbie Thomson	1	0	1 + 0	0	0 + 0	0	0 + 0	0	0 + 0	0
22	DF	(England) ENG	Jack O'Connell	45	0	38 + 0	0	4 + 0	0	1 + 0	0	2 + 0	0
23	GK	(England) ENG	Steve Collis	0	0	0 + 0	0	0 + 0	0	0 + 0	0	0 + 0	0
24	MF	(England) ENG	Jamie Allen	29	6	22 + 3	6	1 + 1	0	0 + 0	0	1 + 1	0
25	DF	(England) ENG	Michael Rose	47	5	42 + 0	4	3 + 0	1	0 + 0	0	1 + 1	0
26	MF	(England) ENG	Joel Logan	0	0	0 + 0	0	0 + 0	0	0 + 0	0	0 + 0	0
28	MF	(Northern Ireland) NIR	Callum Camps	1	0	0 + 0	0	0 + 1	0	0 + 0	0	0 + 0	0
29	FW	(Republic of Ireland) IRL	Graham Cummins	31	4	15 + 12	4	0 + 2	0	0 + 0	0	1 + 1	0
33	DF	(Republic of Ireland) IRL	Sean McGinty	1	0	0 + 1	0	0 + 0	0	0 + 0	0	0 + 0	0
38	MF	(Republic of Ireland) IRL	Gary Dicker	15	1	10 + 2	1	1 + 0	0	0 + 0	0	2 + 0	0
39	DF	(England) ENG	Joe Bunney	24	3	7 + 14	3	1 + 1	0	0 + 0	0	0 + 1	0
40	FW	(England) ENG	Ian Henderson	52	12	45 + 0	11	4 + 0	1	0 + 1	0	2 + 0	0

== Match details ==
=== Pre-season friendlies ===
9 July 2013	Northwich Victoria	0–5	Rochdale	Stafford
19:45 BST		Report		Stadium: Marston Road

13 July 2013	FC Halifax Town	1–2	Rochdale	Halifax
15:00 BST		Report		Stadium: The Shay

16 July 2013	Stalybridge Celtic	0–3	Rochdale	Stalybridge
19:30 BST		Report		Stadium: Bower Fold

20 July 2013	Rochdale	2–2	Blackburn Rovers	Rochdale
15:00 BST	Hogan 12'; Vincenti 48'	Report	Campbell 61'; Pedersen 91'	Stadium: Spotland Stadium

23 July 2013	Macclesfield Town	0–3	Rochdale	Macclesfield
19:30 BST		Report		Stadium: Moss Rose

27 July 2013	Rochdale	1–1	Preston North End	Rochdale
15:00 BST		Report		Stadium: Spotland Stadium

29 July 2013	Winsford United	1–3	Rochdale	Winsford
19:30 BST		Report		Stadium: St. Luke's Barton Stadium

=== League Two ===
3 August 2013 1	Rochdale	3–0	Hartlepool United	Rochdale
15:00 BST	Hogan 14'; Rafferty (yellow card) 39'; Donnelly 50' (pen.); Henderson 57'	Report; Report		Stadium: Spotland Stadium; Attendance: 3,177; Referee: Michael Bull

10 August 2013 2	Burton Albion	1–0	Rochdale	Burton upon Trent
15:00 BST	Bell (yellow card) 38'; Lancashire 43' (o.g.)	Report	Cavanagh (red card) 7'; Henderson (yellow card) 35'	Stadium: Pirelli Stadium; Attendance: 2,679; Referee: Seb Stockbridge

17 August 2013 3	Rochdale	2–2	Chesterfield	Rochdale
	Donnelly (yellow card) 26'; Tutte 31' (pen.); Hogan (yellow card) 46' (goal) 51'; Rafferty (yellow card) 78'	Report; Report	Richards 19'; Roberts (yellow card) 29' (goal) 65'; Lee (yellow card) 30'; Hird (yellow card) 38'	Stadium: Spotland Stadium; Attendance: 2,899; Referee: Andy Haines

24 August 2013 4	Plymouth Argyle	1–0	Rochdale	Plymouth
	Berry (yellow card) 12'; Reid 25' (pen.); Branston (yellow card) 62'	Report	Lund (yellow card) 33'; O'Connell (yellow card) 38'; Done (yellow card) 53'	Stadium: Home Park; Attendance: 6,978; Referee: Brendan Malone

31 August 2013 5	Oxford United	1–1	Rochdale	Oxford
	Constable 24'; Hall (yellow card) 33'; Whing (yellow card) 40'	Report	Lund (yellow card) 16' (goal) 51'	Stadium: Kassam Stadium; Attendance: 5,260; Referee: Fred Graham

7 September 2013 6	Rochdale	1–0	Bury	Rochdale
	Lund (yellow card) 10'; Hogan (yellow card) 32' (goal) 36'; Vincenti (yellow card) 25' (yellow-red card) 38'	Report		Stadium: Spotland Stadium; Attendance: 5,616; Referee: Carl Boyeson

14 September 2013 7	Rochdale	1–0	Torquay United	Rochdale
	Henderson 77'; O'Connell (yellow card) 82'	Report		Stadium: Spotland Stadium; Attendance: 2,138; Referee: Mark Haywood

21 September 2013 8	Accrington Stanley	1–2	Rochdale	Accrington
	Odejayi 24'; McCartan (yellow card) 41'; Naylor (yellow card) 54'	Report	Lund 7'; Hogan 13'; Bennett (yellow card) 36'; Donnelly (red card) 45+3'	Stadium: Wham Stadium; Attendance: 2,180; Referee: Mark Brown

28 September 2013 9	Rochdale	3–2	Wycombe Wanderers	Rochdale
15:00	Hogan 5'; Bunney 10'; Rose 15'; Lund (yellow card) 50'	Report	Hause (yellow card) 31'; McClure 42'; Kuffour 58'; Johnson (yellow card) 85'	Stadium: Spotland Stadium; Attendance: 2,303; Referee: David Webb

5 October 2013 10	Portsmouth	3–0	Rochdale	Portsmouth
15:00	Wallace (yellow card) 16' (goal) 24'; Bradley (yellow card) 45+2'; N'Gala 52', 66'; Ertl (yellow card) 56'; Painter (yellow card) 78'	Report	Bennett (yellow card) 51'	Stadium: Fratton Park; Attendance: 15,155; Referee: Simon Hooper

12 October 2013 11	Rochdale	3–0	Newport County	Rochdale
15:00 BST	Vincenti 5'; Cummins 38'; Hery 72'	Report; Report	Hughes (yellow card) 30'; Chapman (yellow card) 43'	Stadium: Spotland Stadium; Attendance: 2,530; Referee: Steven Rushton

19 October 2013 12	Cheltenham Town	1–2	Rochdale	Cheltenham
15:00 BST	Penn (yellow card) 43'; McGlashan (yellow card) 45'; Braham-Barrett (yellow card) 55'; Brown 63'	Report; Report	Dicker (yellow card) 17'; Vincenti (yellow card) 37'; Henderson (yellow card) 62' (goal) 82', 90+3'	Stadium: Whaddon Road; Attendance: 2,887; Referee: Gavin Ward

22 October 2013 13	Rochdale	3–2	Northampton Town	Rochdale
19.45 BST	Henderson 26'; Rose 80'; Donnelly 90+1'	Report; Report	Norris 2'; Dallas 39'	Stadium: Spotland Stadium; Attendance: 2,362; Referee: Michael Naylor

26 October 2013 14	Dagenham & Redbridge	3–1	Rochdale	Dagenham
15:00 BST	Murphy 9'; Elito 52', 90+5'; Hoyte (yellow card) 88'	Report; Report	Rafferty (yellow card) 14'; Lancashire (yellow card) 58'; Dicker 64'; O'Connell (yellow card) 81'	Stadium: Victoria Road; Attendance: 1,742; Referee: Carl Berry

2 November 2013 15	Rochdale	1–2	AFC Wimbledon	Rochdale
15:00 GMT	Done (yellow card) 30'; Allen 35'; Rose (yellow card) 82'	Report; Report	Moore 54' (yellow card) 69'; Frampton 84'; Fuller (yellow card) 90+4'	Stadium: Spotland Stadium; Attendance: 2,483; Referee: Iain Williamson

16 November 2013 16	Morecambe	1–2	Rochdale	Morecambe
15:00 GMT	Sampson (yellow card) 20'; McCready (yellow card) 85'; Amond 89'; Mwasile (yellow card) 90'	Report; Report	Hughes (o.g.); Hogan 66'	Stadium: Globe Arena; Attendance: 2,563; Referee: Eddie Ilderton

23 November 2013 17	Rochdale	3–1	Exeter City	Rochdale
15:00 GMT	Rose 39'; Cummins 65'; Tutte 87'	Report	Baldwin (yellow card) 38'; Gow 46'	Stadium: Spotland Stadium; Attendance: 2,428; Referee: Jeremy Simpson

26 November 2013 18	Rochdale	0–4	Scunthorpe United	Rochdale
19:45 GMT	Tutte (yellow card) 46'; Lancashire (yellow card) 66' (yellow-red card) 69'; O'Connell (red card) 74'	Report	Cavanan 40'; Winnall 75' (pen.); Spencer 86'; Syers 90'	Stadium: Spotland Stadium; Attendance: 2,174; Referee: Tony Harrington

30 November 2013 19	York City	0–0	Rochdale	York
15:00 GMT	Jarvis (yellow card) 18'; Lowe (yellow card) 43'; O'Neill (yellow card) 89'	Report	Tutte (yellow card) 65'; Done (yellow card) 76'; Rose (yellow card) 84'	Stadium: Bootham Crescent; Attendance: 3,471; Referee: Andy Davies

14 December 2013 20	Rochdale	1–2	Fleetwood Town	Rochdale
15:00 GMT	Hogan 40'; Molyneux (yellow card) 85'	Report; Report	Sarcevic 50' (pen.); Roberts 83'	Stadium: Spotland Stadium; Attendance: 2,698; Referee: Richard Clark

20 December 2013 21	Southend United	1–1	Rochdale	Southend-on-Sea
19:45 GMT	Leonard (yellow card) 39'; Hurst 45'	Report	Allen 14'; Lund (yellow card) 86'	Stadium: Roots Hall; Attendance: 5,104; Referee: Graham Horwood

26 December 2013 22	Rochdale	3–0	Mansfield Town	Rochdale
15:00 GMT	Hogan 6', 50'; Lund 13'	Report; Report	Meikle (yellow card) 52'	Stadium: Spotland Stadium; Attendance: 2,671; Referee: Mark Haywood

29 December 2013 23	Rochdale	2–0	Bristol Rovers	Rochdale
15:00 GMT	Cavanagh (yellow card) 28'; Hogan 58'; Cummins 62'	Report; Report		Stadium: Spotland Stadium; Attendance: 2,576; Referee: Darren Drysdale

1 January 2014 24	Scunthorpe United	3–0	Rochdale	Scunthorpe
15:00 GMT	Syers 58'; Ribeiro (yellow card) 69'; Burton (yellow card) 69'; Winnall 82', 84'	Report; Report	Cavanagh (yellow card) 68'; Hogan (yellow card) 68'; Donnelly (yellow card) 69'; Lancashire (yellow card) 75'; Rose (yellow card) 47' (yellow-red card) 80'; Lund (yellow card) 84'	Stadium: Glanford Park; Attendance: 4,017; Referee: Andy Woolmer

11 January 2014 25	Hartlepool United	0–3	Rochdale	Hartlepool
15:00 GMT	Walton (yellow card) 41'	Report	Donnelly 50'; Cavanagh (yellow card) 57' (goal) 63'; Hogan (yellow card) 70'; Cummins 90'	Stadium: Victoria Park; Attendance: 3,685; Referee: Rob Lewis

18 January 2014 26	Rochdale	3–0	Plymouth Argyle	Rochdale
15:00 GMT	Allen 5'; Henderson 76'; Rose 89'	Report	Gurrieri (red card) 53'; Blanchard (yellow card) 82'; Purrington (yellow card) 85'	Stadium: Spotland Stadium; Attendance: 2,839; Referee: Mark Brown

21 January 2014 27	Chesterfield	2–2	Rochdale	Chesterfield
19:45 GMT	Roberts 40'; Richards 70' (red card) 90+1'	Report	Henderson 90+2' (pen.); Vincenti 90+3'; Cummins (yellow card) 90+3'	Stadium: Proact Stadium; Attendance: 5,078; Referee: Andy D'Urso

1 February 2014 28	Rochdale	0–1	Dagenham & Redbridge	Rochdale
15:00 GMT		Report	Wilkinson (yellow card) 59'; Murphy 63'	Stadium: Spotland Stadium; Attendance: 2,273; Referee: Andy Madley

8 February 2014 29	AFC Wimbledon	0–3	Rochdale	Kingston upon Thames
15:00 GMT	Pell (yellow card) 24'	Report	Hogan 66', 79', 82'	Stadium: Kingsmeadow; Attendance: 3,837; Referee: Oliver Langford

15 February 2014 30	Rochdale	2–1	Morecambe	Rochdale
15:00 GMT	Hogan 35'; Lund (yellow card) 40'; Henderson 73'; Rose (yellow card) 84'	Report	Redshaw 32'	Stadium: Spotland Stadium; Attendance: 2,344; Referee: Geoff Eltringham

18 February 2014 31	Rochdale	1–1	Burton Albion	Rochdale
19:45 GMT	Donnelly 67'; Done (yellow card) 75'; Kennedy (yellow card) 90+6'	Report	Phillips (yellow card) 25'; Ismail 35' (yellow card) 45+1'; Sharps (yellow card) 42'	Stadium: Spotland Stadium; Attendance: 2,092; Referee: Scott Duncan

22 February 2014 32	Exeter City	0–1	Rochdale	Exeter
15:00 GMT		Report	O'Connell (yellow card) 29'; Allen (yellow card) 35' (goal) 45'	Stadium: St James Park; Attendance: 3,169; Referee: Andy Woolmer

1 March 2014 33	Rochdale	3–0	Oxford United	Rochdale
15:00 GMT	Done (yellow card) 39'; Hogan 45', 50', 62'	Report	Raynes (yellow card) 9'	Stadium: Spotland Stadium; Attendance: 3,429; Referee: Eddie Ilderton

7 March 2014 34	Bury	0–0	Rochdale	Bury
19:45 GMT	McNulty (yellow card) 54'	Report	Henderson (yellow card) 34' (yellow-red card) 44'; Lillis (yellow card) 86'; Vincenti (yellow card) 89'	Stadium: Gigg Lane; Attendance: 6,295; Referee: Darren Drysdale

11 March 2014 35	Torquay United	2–1	Rochdale	Torquay
19:45 GMT	Pearce 45'; Labadie (yellow card) 70' (goal) 82'	Report	Allen 39'; Done (yellow card) 63'; Lancashire (yellow card) 16' (yellow-red card) 88'	Stadium: Plainmoor; Attendance: 1,627; Referee: Graham Horwood

15 March 2014 36	Rochdale	2–1	Accrington Stanley	Rochdale
15:00 GMT	Lund 77', 90+2'; Vincenti (yellow card) 90+7'	Report	Murphy (yellow card) 68'; Mingoia 72'	Stadium: Spotland Stadium; Attendance: 2,841; Referee: Andy D'Urso

18 March 2014 37	Northampton Town	0–3	Rochdale	Northampton
19:45 GMT	Ravenhill (yellow card) 48'; McSweeney (yellow card) 66'	Report	Henderson 6'; Lund 54' (yellow card) 45+2' (yellow-red card) 55'; Bunney 65'; Donnelly (yellow card) 81'	Stadium: Sixfields Stadium; Attendance: 3,695; Referee: Mark Heywood

22 March 2014 38	Wycombe Wanderers	0–2	Rochdale	High Wycombe
15:00 GMT	Wood (yellow card) 20'	Report	Cavanagh (yellow card) 36'; Allen 52'; Vincenti (yellow card) 60' (goal) 75'	Stadium: Adams Park; Attendance: 3,594; Referee: Carl Boyeson

25 March 2014 39	Rochdale	3–0	Portsmouth	Rochdale
19:45 GMT	Lund 16'; Henderson 59'; Vincenti 63'	Report		Stadium: Spotland Stadium; Attendance: 2,746; Referee: Nigel Miller

29 March 2014 40	Fleetwood Town	0–0	Rochdale	Fleetwood
15:00 GMT		Report	Rose (yellow card) 31'	Stadium: Highbury Stadium; Attendance: 4,261; Referee: Michael Naylor

5 April 2014 41	Rochdale	0–0	York City	Rochdale
15:00 BST	Done (yellow card) 40'; Rafferty (yellow card) 58'	Report	Lowe (yellow card) 81'	Stadium: Spotland Stadium; Attendance: 3,830; Referee: Kevin Wright

12 April 2014 42	Mansfield Town	3–0	Rochdale	Mansfield
15:07 BST	Tafazolli (yellow card) 14' (goal) 90'; Riley 72'; Rhead 87'	Report	Lancashire (yellow card) 27'; Done (yellow card) 40'; Hogan (yellow card) 52'; Cavanagh (yellow card) 61'; Donnelly (yellow card) 90+4'	Stadium: Field Mill; Attendance: 3,843; Referee: Trevor Kettle

18 April 2014 43	Rochdale	0–3	Southend United	Rochdale
15:00 BST	Done (yellow card) 49'; Lund (yellow card) 81'; Vincenti (yellow card) 84'	Report	Corr 12'; Murphy 44'; Timlin 46'; Hurst (yellow card) 55'	Stadium: Spotland Stadium; Attendance: 3,884; Referee: Jeremy Simpson

21 April 2014 44	Bristol Rovers	1–2	Rochdale	Bristol
13:00 BST	Mohamed 17'	Report	Bunney 46'; Lund 63'	Stadium: Memorial Stadium; Attendance: 8,158; Referee: Dean Whitestone

26 April 2014 45	Rochdale	2–0	Cheltenham Town	Rochdale
15:00 BST	Vincenti 11'; Henderson 16'	Report		Stadium: Spotland Stadium; Attendance: 4,372; Referee: Oliver Langford

3 May 2014 46	Newport County	2–1	Rochdale	Newport
15:00 BST	O'Connor 41'; Flynn (yellow card) 72'; Jackson (red card) 84'; Feely 88'	Report	Donnelly 28'; Lund (yellow card) 65'; Henderson (yellow card) 90+1'	Stadium: Rodney Parade; Attendance: 4,662; Referee: James Adcock

=== FA Cup ===
9 November 2013 1st round	Torquay United	0–2	Rochdale	Rochdale
15:00 GMT	O'Connor (yellow card) 13'	Report	Lancashire (yellow card) 40'; Rafferty (yellow card) 58'; Hogan 85'; Vincenti 89'	Stadium: Spotland Stadium; Attendance: 1,976; Referee: Keith Hill

7 December 2013 2nd round	Rotherham United	1–2	Rochdale	Rotherham
15:00 GMT	Frecklington 6' (yellow card) 80'; Brindley (yellow card) 29'; Morgan (yellow card) 55'; Tidser (yellow card) 35' (yellow-red card) 74'	Report	Lancashire (yellow card) 11'; Lund 55' (yellow card) 85'; Vincenti 83'; Bennett (yellow card) 90+4'	Stadium: New York Stadium; Attendance: 4,957; Referee: Graham Scott

4 January 2014 3rd round	Rochdale	2–0	Leeds United	Rochdale
15:00 GMT	Done (yellow card) 14'; Bunney (yellow card) 26'; Cavanagh (yellow card) 36'; Hogan 45+2'; Henderson 84'	Report	Pearce (yellow card) 32'; Pugh (yellow card) 88'	Stadium: Spotland Stadium; Attendance: 8,255; Referee: Mike Jones

25 January 2014 4th round	Rochdale	1–2	Sheffield Wednesday	Rochdale
	Eastham (yellow card) 6'; Lund (yellow card) 20'; Rose 60' (yellow card) 85'	Report	Mattock 51' (yellow card) 31' (yellow-red card) 64'; Semedo (yellow card) 55'; Onyewu 57'	Stadium: Spotland Stadium; Attendance: 8,240; Referee: Simon Hooper

=== League Cup ===
6 August 2014 1st round	Doncaster Rovers	1–0	Rochdale	Doncaster
19:45 BST	Khumalo 89'	Report		Stadium: Keepmoat Stadium; Attendance: 4,368; Referee: Gary Sutton

=== Football League Trophy ===
8 October 2013 1st round	Port Vale	0–1	Rochdale	Stoke-on-Trent
19:30 BST	Lines (yellow card) 34'; Myrie-Williams (yellow card) 49'; Jones (yellow card) 68'	Report	Henderson (yellow card) 26'; Rafferty 40'; Hogan (yellow card) 75'	Stadium: Vale Park; Attendance: 2,612; Referee: Scott Mathieson

12 November 2013 2nd round	Chesterfield	3–0	Rochdale	Chesterfield
19:45 GMT	Banks 45', 79'; Gnanduillet 73'	Report		Stadium: Proact Stadium; Attendance: 2,897; Referee: Christopher Sarginson
