= Nyal Bell =

English footballer (born 1997)

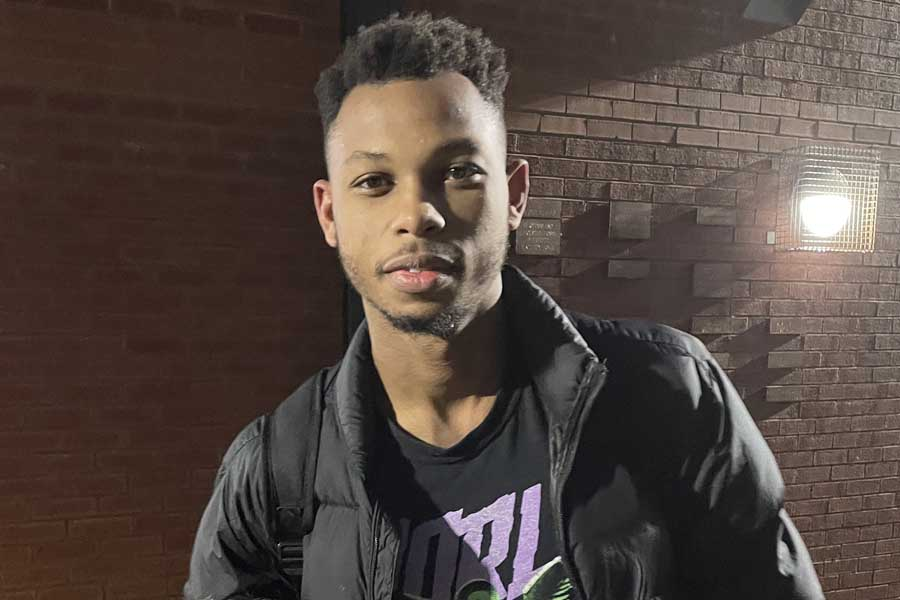
- Bell in January 2022

Personal information
- Full name: Nyal Aston Nathanial Bell
- Date of birth: 18 January 1997 (age 29)
- Place of birth: Manchester, England
- Height: 6 ft 2 in (1.88 m)
- Position: Forward

Team information
- Current team: Hyde United

Youth career
- –2014: Rochdale

Senior career*
Years	Team	Apps	(Gls)
2014–2016	Rochdale	3	(0)
2015	→ Droylsden (loan)	7	(0)
2016	→ Chester (loan)	3	(0)
2016–2018	Gateshead	9	(2)
2016	→ Altrincham (loan)	6	(0)
2017–2018	→ Chester (loan)	13	(1)
2018	→ Alfreton Town (loan)	12	(4)
2018–2021	Stockport County	74	(15)
2020–2021	→ Halifax Town (loan)	7	(3)
2021	→ Altrincham (loan)	9	(0)
2021–2022	Kidderminster Harriers	8	(0)
2021	→ Curzon Ashton (loan)	4	(0)
2021–2022	→ Tamworth (loan)	15	(3)
2022–2023	Southport	0	(0)
2023–	Hyde United	4	(0)
- * Club domestic league appearances and goals as of 22:13, 2 January 2024 (UTC)

Nyal Aston Nathanial Bell (born 18 January 1997) is an English footballer who plays as a forward for Hyde United.

== Playing career ==
=== Rochdale ===
A Rochdale youth graduate, Bell made his first team debut on 20 September 2014, coming on as a late substitute in a 1–0 home win against Coventry City. On 23 October he was included in LFE's XI for October, due to his good performances with the academy.

=== Droylsden ===
Nyal spent 1 month on loan at semi-pro club Droylsden after an unsuccessful second season spell at Rochdale.

==== Chester (loan) ====
Bell joined Chester on loan for initially a month.

=== Gateshead ===
On 15 June 2016, Bell joined Gateshead following his release by Rochdale.

=== Altrincham ===
Bell joined Altrincham on a one-month loan on 19 August. He made his debut the following day in a 0–2 defeat to Gainsborough Trinity.

=== Stockport County ===
In June 2018, Bell joined hometown team, Stockport County from Gateshead. Bell was a regular member of the Stockport starting eleven in their championship winning 2018/19 season, scoring 9 goals in 35 league appearances. Despite a slow start to the season Bell's performances quickly improved, toward the end of the season he became manager Jim Gannon's first choice striker over teammate Frank Mulhern.

In September 2018, Bell scored a goal against Leamington and celebrated in the corner with a man dressed as a bride. The moment was captured the following week in a match program entitled 'Ding Dong Bell'

==== FC Halifax Town (loan) ====
On 23 November 2020, Bell joined Halifax Town on a short-term loan deal. On 4 January 2021, Bell was recalled by his parent club Stockport County after scoring three goals from seven league games for Halifax Town.

==== Altrincham (second spell on loan) ====
On 16 March 2021, Bell returned to Altrincham on loan for the remainder of the 2020–21 season.

=== Kidderminster Harriers ===
On 28 June 2021, Bell agreed to join National League North side Kidderminster Harriers following his release from Stockport. Following the conclusion of the 2021-22 season, he was released by the club.

==== Tamworth (loan) ====
On 24 December 2021, Bell signed on loan for Southern League Premier Central side Tamworth on a deal running until 6 February 2022.

=== Southport ===
On 2 July 2022, Bell signed for Southport. Upon the expiry of his contract, he was released at the end of the season after an injury prevented him ever making an appearance for the club.

=== Hyde United ===
On 30 September 2023 Bell signed for Hyde United.

== Career statistics ==
As of match played 8 August 2017

Appearances and goals by club, season and competition
Club	Season	League			FA Cup		League Cup		Other		Total	
Club	Season	Division	Apps	Goals	Apps	Goals	Apps	Goals	Apps	Goals	Apps	Goals
Rochdale	2014–15	League One	3	0	0	0	0	0	0	0	3	0
Rochdale	2014–16	League One	0	0	0	0	0	0	0	0	0	0
Rochdale	Rochdale total		3	0	0	0	0	0	0	0	3	0
Droylsden (loan)	2015–16	NPL Division One North	4	0	0	0	0	0	1 (Note: Appearance in Manchester Premier Cup)	0	5	0
Chester (loan)	2015–16	National League	3	0	0	0	0	0	0	0	3	0
Gateshead	2016–17	National League	9	2	1	0	0	0	2 (Note: Appearances in FA Trophy)	0	12	2
Gateshead	2017–18	National League	0	0	0	0	0	0	0	0	0	0
Gateshead	Gateshead total		9	2	1	0	0	0	2	0	12	2
Altrincham (loan)	2016–17	National League North	3	0	0	0	0	0	0	0	3	0
Chester (loan)	2017–18	National League North	1	0	0	0	0	0	0	0	1	0
Career total			23	2	1	0	0	0	3	0	27	2
