= 2014–15 Rochdale A.F.C. season =

English football club season

Rochdale A.F.C.
2014–15 season
- Chairman: Chris Dunphy
- Manager: Keith Hill
- Stadium: Spotland Stadium
- League One: 8th
- FA Cup: Fourth round
- Football League Cup: First round
- Football League Trophy: Second round
- Top goalscorer: League: Ian Henderson (22); All: Ian Henderson (22)
Home colours	Away colours

The 2014–15 season was Rochdale A.F.C.'s 108th in existence. Rochdale returned to Football League One for 2014–15 following promotion in 2013–14 Football League Two.

Rochdale began the season on 9 August 2014, with the opening game of their League One campaign. They also competed in the two domestic cups, the FA Cup and the League Cup.

== Background ==
Rochdale finished third in the League two last season meaning that they gained automatic promotion to League One. Scott Hogan, George Donnelly and Matt Done left the club. Rochdale completed their first signing of the season on 15 May 2014 with the acquisition of Jack Muldoon from Workshop Town on a free transfer, and followed this up in the following five days with Sean McGinty from Sheffield United.

== Statistics ==
No.	Pos	Nat	Player	Total		League One		FA Cup		League Cup		League Trophy	
No.	Pos	Nat	Player	Apps	Goals	Apps	Goals	Apps	Goals	Apps	Goals	Apps	Goals
1	GK	(England) ENG	Josh Lillis	19	0	14 + 2	0	2 + 0	0	1 + 0	0	0 + 0	0
2	DF	(Republic of Ireland) IRL	Joe Rafferty	39	1	28 + 3	1	4 + 1	0	0 + 1	0	2 + 0	0
3	DF	(England) ENG	Rhys Bennett	46	3	33 + 6	2	5 + 0	1	1 + 0	0	0 + 1	0
5	DF	(England) ENG	Ashley Eastham	49	2	40 + 1	2	6 + 0	0	0 + 0	0	2 + 0	0
6	DF	(England) ENG	Olly Lancashire	28	1	16 + 5	0	6 + 0	1	1 + 0	0	0 + 0	0
7	MF	(England) ENG	Peter Vincenti	44	16	36 + 1	13	4 + 0	2	1 + 0	0	2 + 0	1
8	MF	(Northern Ireland) NIR	Matthew Lund	18	2	12 + 2	2	3 + 0	0	1 + 0	0	0 + 0	0
9	FW	(England) ENG	Calvin Andrew	41	6	5 + 27	5	1 + 5	0	1 + 0	0	0 + 2	1
10	FW	(Saint Kitts and Nevis) SKN	Febian Brandy	4	0	1 + 3	0	0 + 0	0	0 + 0	0	0 + 0	0
11	FW	(England) ENG	Reuben Noble-Lazarus	21	2	7 + 12	1	0 + 2	1	0 + 0	0	0 + 0	0
12	MF	(Republic of Ireland) IRL	Stephen Dawson	36	0	27 + 3	0	5 + 0	0	0 + 0	0	1 + 0	0
14	MF	(France) FRA	Bastien Héry	28	1	12 + 9	1	3 + 1	0	1 + 0	0	2 + 0	0
16	FW	(Wales) WAL	Matt Done	30	14	23 + 0	10	5 + 0	3	0 + 0	0	2 + 0	1
17	DF	(England) ENG	Scott Tanser	36	1	27 + 3	1	4 + 0	0	1 + 0	0	1 + 0	0
18	FW	(England) ENG	Jack Muldoon	6	0	2 + 1	0	1 + 1	0	0 + 0	0	0 + 1	0
19	MF	(Poland) POL	Tomasz Cywka	5	0	1 + 2	0	0 + 2	0	0 + 0	0	0 + 0	0
19	FW	(England) ENG	George Donnelly	4	0	1 + 2	0	0 + 0	0	0 + 1	0	0 + 0	0
19	GK	(England) ENG	Jamie Jones	13	0	13 + 0	0	0 + 0	0	0 + 0	0	0 + 0	0
20	MF	(Republic of Ireland) IRL	Brian Barry-Murphy	0	0	0 + 0	0	0 + 0	0	0 + 0	0	0 + 0	0
21	GK	(England) ENG	Johny Diba	1	0	0 + 1	0	0 + 0	0	0 + 0	0	0 + 0	0
22	GK	(Republic of Ireland) IRL	Conrad Logan	25	0	19 + 0	0	4 + 0	0	0 + 0	0	2 + 0	0
22	DF	(England) ENG	Jack O'Connell	31	5	28 + 1	5	0 + 0	0	0 + 0	0	2 + 0	0
24	MF	(England) ENG	Jamie Allen	41	0	33 + 2	0	2 + 2	0	0 + 0	0	2 + 0	0
25	DF	(England) ENG	Michael Rose	37	1	26 + 6	1	4 + 0	0	1 + 0	0	0 + 0	0
26	MF	(England) ENG	Joel Logan	10	0	4 + 4	0	1 + 0	0	0 + 1	0	0 + 0	0
27	MF	(England) ENG	Andy Cannon	19	0	16 + 2	0	0 + 0	0	0 + 0	0	1 + 0	0
28	MF	(Northern Ireland) NIR	Callum Camps	15	1	6 + 6	1	2 + 0	0	0 + 0	0	0 + 1	0
30	DF	(England) ENG	Kisimba Kisimba	0	0	0 + 0	0	0 + 0	0	0 + 0	0	0 + 0	0
31	FW	(England) ENG	Nyal Bell	3	0	0 + 3	0	0 + 0	0	0 + 0	0	0 + 0	0
32	MF	(England) ENG	William Hasler-Cregg	0	0	0 + 0	0	0 + 0	0	0 + 0	0	0 + 0	0
33	DF	(England) ENG	Tom Kennedy	24	0	22 + 1	0	0 + 0	0	0 + 0	0	1 + 0	0
34	MF	(England) ENG	James Hooper	0	0	0 + 0	0	0 + 0	0	0 + 0	0	0 + 0	0
39	DF	(England) ENG	Joe Bunney	22	2	10 + 9	2	0 + 2	0	1 + 0	0	0 + 0	0
40	FW	(England) ENG	Ian Henderson	50	22	44 + 0	22	4 + 0	0	1 + 0	0	1 + 0	0
45	FW	(England) ENG	Shamir Fenelon	5	0	0 + 4	0	0 + 0	0	0 + 0	0	1 + 0	0

== Players ==
=== Squad information ===
No.	Name	Position	Nationality	Place of birth	Date of birth (age)	Club caps	Club goals	Signed from	Date signed	Fee	Contract end
Goalkeepers
1	Josh Lillis	GK	(England)	Derby	24 June 1987 (age 39)	115	0	Scunthorpe United	1 July 2012	Free	2016
21	Johny Diba	GK	(England)	(Democratic Republic of the Congo) Mbuji-Mayi	12 October 1997 (age 29)	0	0	Academy	1 July 2014	Trainee	2015
23	Steve Collis	GK	(England)	Harrow	18 March 1981 (age 45)	0	0	Buxton	31 January 2013	Free	2015
Defenders
2	Joe Rafferty	RB	(Republic of Ireland)	(England) Liverpool	6 October 1993 (age 33)	52	0	Liverpool	6 July 2012	Free	2015
3	Rhys Bennett	CB	(England)	Ashton-in-Makerfield	1 September 1991 (age 35)	27	2	Bolton Wanderers	1 July 2012	Free	2016
4	Sean McGinty	CB	(Republic of Ireland)	(England) Maidstone	11 August 1993 (age 33)	1	0	Sheffield United	20 May 2014	Free	2015
5	Ashley Eastham	CB	(England)	Preston	22 March 1993 (age 33)	15	0	Blackpool	1 July 2013	Free	2015
6	Olly Lancashire	CB	(England)	Basingstoke	13 December 1988 (age 37)	28	0	Aldershot Town	1 July 2013	Free	2015
17	Scott Tanser	LB	(England)	Blackpool	23 October 1994 (age 32)	1	0	Academy	1 July 2013	Trainee	2015
25	Michael Rose	LB	(England)	Salford	28 July 1982 (age 44)	52	6	Colchester United	14 February 2013	Free	2015
Midfielders
7	Peter Vincenti	AM	(Jersey)	Saint Peter	7 July 1986 (age 40)	42	5	Aldershot Town	1 July 2013	Free	2016
8	Matty Lund	CM	(Northern Ireland) (England)	Manchester	21 November 1990 (age 35)	39	8	Stoke City	1 July 2013	Free	2015
12	Stephen Dawson	CM	(Republic of Ireland)	Dublin	4 December 1985 (age 40)	0	0	Barnsley	13 August 2014	Free	2015
14	Bastien Héry	DM	(France)	Brou-sur-Chantereine	23 March 1992 (age 34)	28	1	Sheffield Wednesday	1 July 2013	Free	2015
16	Matt Done	LM	(Wales)	Oswestry	22 July 1988 (age 38)	71	5	Barnsley	8 July 2013	Free	2016
20	Brian Barry-Murphy	CM	(Republic of Ireland)	Cork	27 July 1978 (age 48)	65	1	Bury	1 July 2010	Free	2015
24	Jamie Allen	CM	(England)	Rochdale	29 January 1995 (age 31)	21	6	Academy	1 July 2013	Trainee	2015
27	Andy Cannon	CM	(England)	Tameside	14 March 1996 (age 30)	0	0	Academy	1 July 2014	Trainee	2015
28	Callum Camps	AM	(Northern Ireland)	(England) Stockport	30 November 1995 (age 30)	2	0	Academy	2014	Trainee	2016
Forwards
18	Jack Muldoon	CF	(England)	Scunthorpe	19 May 1989 (age 37)	0	0	Worksop Town	15 May 2014	Free	2015
26	Joel Logan	CF	(England)	Manchester	25 January 1995 (age 31)	1	0	Academy	1 July 2013	Trainee	2015
39	Joe Bunney	CF	(England)	Manchester	26 September 1993 (age 33)	14	3	Stockport County	29 March 2013	Free	2015
40	Ian Henderson	CF	(England) (Scotland)	Thetford	24 January 1985 (age 41)	40	10	Colchester United	26 February 2013	Free	2015

=== Goalscorers ===
Includes all competitive matches. The list is sorted alphabetically by surname when total goals are equal.

Correct as of match played on 25 May 2015

No.	Nat.	Player	Pos.	League One	FA Cup	League Cup	Other	Total
40	(England)	Ian Henderson	FW	22	0	0	0	22
7	(Jersey)	Peter Vincenti	MF	13	2	0	1	16
16	(England)	Matt Done	FW	7	0	0	0	7
9	(England)	Calvin Andrew	FW	5	0	0	1	6
3	(England)	Rhys Bennett	MF	4	1	0	0	5
22	(England)	Jack O'Connell	DF	5	0	0	0	5
39	(England)	Joe Bunney	FW	2	0	0	0	2
4	(England)	Ashley Eastham	DF	2	0	0	0	2
6	(England)	Olly Lancashire	DF	1	1	0	0	2
8	(Northern Ireland)	Matty Lund	MF	2	0	0	0	2
28	(Northern Ireland)	Callum Camps	MF	1	0	0	0	1
2	(Republic of Ireland)	Joe Rafferty	DF	1	0	0	0	1
25	(England)	Michael Rose	DF	1	0	0	0	1
17	(England)	Scott Tanser	DF	1	0	0	0	1
11	(Grenada)	Reuben Noble-Lazarus	MF	0	1	0	0	1

== Match details ==
=== Pre-season ===
12 July 2014	AFC Fylde	1–2	Rochdale	Kellamergh Park, Warton
15:00 BST	Thomas 86'	Report	Camps 34'; Tanser 73'

15 July 2014	FC Halifax Town	2–1	Rochdale	Halifax
19:45 BST	Schofield 5'; Boden 60'	Report	Camps 90+1'	Stadium: The Shay

19 July 2014	Rochdale	2–1	Wigan Athletic	Rochdale
15:00 BST	Henderson 5'; Hery 37'	Report	Tavernier 45'	Stadium: Spotland Stadium

22 July 2014	Rochdale	0–2	Bolton Wanderers	Rochdale
19:45 BST		Report	Danns 23'; Wilkinson 78'	Stadium: Spotland Stadium

26 July 2014	Rochdale	1–3	Middlesbrough	Rochdale
15:00 BST	Henderson 41'	Report	Reach 4'; Kike 15' (pen.); Tomlin 44' (pen.)	Stadium: Spotland Stadium

29 July 2014	Macclesfield Town	0–2	Rochdale	Macclesfield
19:45 BST		Report	Bennett 24'; Camps 29'	Stadium: Moss Rose

2 August 2014	Bury	3–3	Rochdale	Bury
15:00 BST	Eastham 1' (o.g.); Nardiello 41'; Lowe 44'	Report	Bennett 9'; Logan 69', 90'	Stadium: Gigg Lane; Attendance: 1,277 (405 Dale fans)

=== League One ===
==== League table ====
Pos	Team	Pld	W	D	L	GF	GA	GD	Pts	Promotion, qualification or relegation
6	Chesterfield	46	19	12	15	68	55	+13	69	Qualification for League One play-offs (Note: Four teams play for one spot and promotion to Football League Championship.)
7	Bradford City	46	17	14	15	55	55	0	65	
8	Rochdale	46	19	6	21	72	66	+6	63	
9	Peterborough United	46	18	9	19	53	56	−3	63	
10	Fleetwood Town	46	17	12	17	49	52	−3	63	

Updated to match(es) played on 3 May 2015. Source: BBC Sport
Rules for classification: 1) Points; 2) Goal difference; 3) Number of goals scored

==== Matches ====
The fixtures for the 2014–15 season were announced on 18 June 2014 at 9am.

9 August 2014 1	Rochdale	0–1	Peterborough United	Rochdale
15:00	Lancashire (yellow card) 90+2'	Report; Report	Vassell 61'	Stadium: Spotland Stadium; Attendance: 3,613; Referee: Geoff Eltringham

16 August 2014 2	Chesterfield	2–1	Rochdale	Chesterfield
15:00	Roberts (yellow card) 20'; Doyle 39' (pen.), 76' (pen.)	Report; Report	Diba Musangu (yellow card) 72'; Bennett (yellow card) 74'; Henderson (yellow card) 87' (goal) 90+10' (pen.)	Stadium: Proact Stadium; Attendance: 5,682; Referee: Carl Boyeson

19 August 2014 3	Crewe Alexandra	2–5	Rochdale	Crewe
19:45	Haber 9', 62'; Ness (yellow card) 74'	Report; Report	Henderson 31'; Done 42', 55', 72'; Bastien Héry (yellow card) 57'; Vincenti 66'; Rafferty (yellow card) 85'	Stadium: Gresty Road; Attendance: 3,742; Referee: Keith Stroud

23 August 2014 4	Rochdale	1–1	Bristol City	Rochdale
15:00	Eastham (yellow card) 25'; Henderson 56'	Report; Report	Freeman 16'; Baldock (yellow card) 72'	Stadium: Spotland Stadium; Attendance: 3,115; Referee: Mark Haywood

30 August 2014 5	Rochdale	0–2	Bradford City	Rochdale
15:00	Rafferty (yellow card) 62'; Bennett (yellow card) 90+2'	Report; Report	Kennedy 60'; Hanson 66'; Dolan (yellow card) 90+1'	Stadium: Spotland Stadium; Attendance: 4,758; Referee: Nigel Miller

6 September 2014 6	Crawley Town	0–4	Rochdale	Crawley
15:00	McLeod (yellow card) 74'	Report; Report	Done 10'; Vincenti 54' 66'; Andrew 75' (yellow card) 77'; Rafferty (yellow card) 80'	Stadium: Broadfield Stadium; Attendance: 2,534; Referee: Graham Scott

13 September 2014 7	Sheffield United	1–0	Rochdale	Sheffield
15:00	Campbell-Ryce 84' (yellow card) 85'	Report; Report	Rafferty (yellow card) 29'; Done (yellow card) 54'; Logan (yellow card) 90+5'	Stadium: Bramall Lane; Attendance: 19,122; Referee: Gary Sutton

16 September 2014 8	Rochdale	4–0	Walsall	Rochdale
19:45	Done 5'; Eastham 30'; Henderson 37'; Butler 71' (o.g.)	Report; Report		Stadium: Spotland Stadium; Attendance: 2,082; Referee: Andrew Madley

20 September 2014 9	Rochdale	1–0	Coventry City	Rochdale
15:00	Henderson 29' (pen.); Rafferty (yellow card) 75'	Report; Report	Allsop (yellow card) 28'; Hines (yellow card) 56'; Webster (yellow card) 73'	Stadium: Spotland Stadium; Attendance: 3,583; Referee: Phil Gibbs

27 September 2014 10	Leyton Orient	2–3	Rochdale	Leyton
15:00	McAnuff 13'; Vincelot 42'; Omozusi (yellow card) 62'	Report	Done 4', 66'; Eastham (red card) 30'; Dawson (yellow card) 40'; Vincenti 48'; Cannon (yellow card) 54'; Tanser (yellow card) 74'	Stadium: Brisbane Road; Attendance: 4,405; Referee: Darren Sheldrake

4 October 2014 11	Rochdale	0–1	Barnsley	Rochdale
15:00		Report	Ramage 10'; Cole (yellow card) 29'; Hourihane (yellow card) 85'	Stadium: Spotland Stadium; Attendance: 4,380; Referee: Kevin Wright

18 October 2014 12	Rochdale	1–1	Gillingham	Rochdale
15:00	Vincenti 25'; Dawson (yellow card) 82'	Report	Dack (yellow card) 44'; McDonald 83'	Stadium: Spotland Stadium; Attendance: 2,574; Referee: Eddie Ilderton

21 October 2014 13	Swindon Town	2–3	Rochdale	Swindon
19:45	Rodgers 35'; Smith 77'	Report	Lund 49' (yellow card) 51'; Vincenti 60'; Dawson (yellow card) 71'; Héry 90+2'	Stadium: County Ground; Attendance: 6,718; Referee: Steve Martin

25 October 2014 14	Yeovil Town	0–3	Rochdale	Yeovil
15:00	Dawson (yellow card) 76'; Gillett (yellow card) 85'	Report	O'Connell 6'; Henderson 16', 53'	Stadium: Huish Park; Attendance: 3,601; Referee: Pat Miller

1 November 2014 15	Rochdale	3–0	Preston North End	Rochdale
15:00	O'Connell 28' (yellow card) 42'; Henderson 32'; Bennett (yellow card) 60'; Done 61'	Report	Welsh (yellow card) 28'; Jones (yellow card) 32'; Huntington (yellow card) 39'	Stadium: Spotland Stadium; Attendance: 6,102; Referee: Paul Tierney

15 November 2014 16	Port Vale	1–0	Rochdale	Burslem
15:00	Brown 64'; Neal (yellow card) 90+2'; Robertson (yellow card) 90+3'	BBC Report	O'Connell (yellow card) 45+2'; Dawson (yellow card) 70'; Lund (yellow card) 73'	Stadium: Vale Park; Attendance: 5,043; Referee: Graham Horwood

22 November 2014 17	Rochdale	1–3	Doncaster Rovers	Rochdale
15:00 GMT	Done 8' (red card) 54'; Lund (yellow card) 64'	Report	Bennett 25' (yellow card) 70'; Robinson 86'; Main 90'	Stadium: Spotland Stadium; Attendance: 3,229; Referee: Jeremy Simpson

25 November 2014 18	Milton Keynes Dons	2–2	Rochdale	Milton Keynes
19:45	Grigg 19'; Green 84'	Report	Flanagan 20' (o.g.); Hery (yellow card) 39'; Noble-Lazarus 76' (yellow card) 78'; Bennett (yellow card) 90+1'; Lancashire (yellow card) 90+4'	Stadium: Stadium mk Attendance: 6,720; Referee: Mark Haywood

29 November 2014 19	Rochdale	0–3	Oldham Athletic	Rochdale
15:00	Tanser (yellow card) 26'; Noble-Lazarus (yellow card) 75'; Andrew (yellow card) 85'	Report	Johnson 24', 80'; Wilson (yellow card) 29'; Jones (yellow card) 69'; Forte 72' (pen.)	Stadium: Spotland Stadium; Attendance: 7,269; Referee: Mark Haywood

13 December 2014 20	Colchester United	1–4	Rochdale	Colchester
15:00	Eastmond (yellow card) 30'; Massey 50' (yellow card) 90+2'	Report	Lund (yellow card) 3' (goal) 26'; Vincenti 29' (yellow card) 34'; Henderson 41' (pen.); O'Connell 56'	Stadium: Colchester Community Stadium; Attendance: 2,920; Referee: Charles Breakspear

20 December 2014 21	Rochdale	2–2	Notts County	Rochdale
15:00	Vincenti (yellow card) 44' (goal) 64'; Henderson 46'; Rafferty (yellow card) 72'; Done (yellow card) 90+5'	Report	Edwards 42'; Mullins (yellow card) 55'; Whitehouse (yellow card) 90+2'; Thompson 90+5'	Stadium: Spotland Stadium; Attendance: 2,814; Referee: Scott Mathieson

26 December 2014 22	Scunthorpe United	2–1	Rochdale	Scunthorpe
15:00	O'Neil 58'; Madden 77'; McSheffrey (yellow card) 90+3'	Report	Done 69' (yellow card) 87'	Stadium: Glanford Park; Attendance: 4,004; Referee: Tony Harrington

28 December 2014 23	Rochdale	0–2	Fleetwood Town	Rochdale
15:00		Report	Roberts 17'; Morris 38'; McLaughlin (yellow card) 53'	Stadium: Spotland Stadium; Attendance: 3,123; Referee: Bobby Madley

10 January 2015 24	Bradford City	1–2	Rochdale	Bradford
15:00	Pickford (red card) 11'; Stead 32'; Liddle (yellow card) 41'; Morais (yellow card) 82'	Report	Vincenti 13'; Lancashire (yellow card) 62'; Andrew 90+3'	Stadium: Valley Parade; Attendance: 13,571; Referee: Gavin Ward

17 January 2015 25	Rochdale	4–1	Crawley Town	Rochdale
15:00	Tanser 33'; Henderson 38', 88'; Andrew 90+3'	Report	Tomlin (yellow card) 7'; Elliott 76'	Stadium: Spotland Stadium; Attendance: 2,255; Referee: Trevor Kettle

31 January 2015 26	Coventry City	2–2	Rochdale	Coventry
15:00	Samuel 24'; Odelusi 38'; Fleck (yellow card) 81'; Nouble (yellow card) 90+2'	Report	Camps 33'; Andrew (yellow card) 62' (goal) 66'; Henderson (yellow card) 70'; Dawson (yellow card) 73'; Vincenti (yellow card) 87'	Stadium: Ricoh Arena; Attendance: 7,606; Referee: Andy Woolmer

10 February 2015 27	Walsall	3–2	Rochdale	Walsall
19:45	O'Connor 13'; Forde 19'; Hiwula 22'	Report	Vincenti 55'; Eastham 63'	Stadium: Bescot Stadium; Attendance: 3,567; Referee: Steve Martin

14 February 2015 28	Peterborough United	2–1	Rochdale	Peterborough
15:00	Beautyman 4'; Burgess 7' (yellow card) 80'; Brisley (yellow card) 73'; M. Smith (yellow card) 89'	Report	Rafferty 24' (yellow card) 90+2'; Bunney (yellow card) 43'	Stadium: Abax Stadium; Attendance: 5,163; Referee: Keith Hill

21 February 2015 29	Rochdale	1–0	Chesterfield	Rochdale
15:00 GMT	Héry (yellow card) 54'; Henderson (yellow card) 65'	Report	Gnanduillet (yellow card) 73'; Ryan (yellow card) 80'	Stadium: Spotland Stadium; Attendance: 2,967; Referee: David Coote

24 February 2015 30	Rochdale	1–2	Sheffield United	Rochdale
19:45 GMT	O'Connell 74'	Report	McNulty 21'; Murphy (yellow card) 44'; Brayford 61'	Stadium: Spotland Stadium; Attendance: 3,574; Referee: Tony Harrington

28 February 2015 31	Bristol City	1–0	Rochdale	Bristol
15:00 GMT	Wilbraham 14'	Report	Bunney (yellow card) 22'; Bennett (yellow card) 90'	Stadium: Ashton Gate; Attendance: 11,841; Referee: James Adcock

3 March 2015 32	Rochdale	4–0	Crewe Alexandra	Rochdale
19:45 GMT	Bennett (yellow card) 29'; Henderson 38' (pen.), 73' (pen.); Bunney 57', 80'	Report	Davis (yellow card) 26'	Stadium: Spotland Stadium; Attendance: 1,954; Referee: Paul Tierney

7 March 2015 33	Rochdale	2–1	Colchester United	Rochdale
15:00 GMT	Bennett 6' (yellow card) 30'; Henderson 55'	Report	Porter 63' (pen.); Noble-Lazarus (yellow card) 84'	Stadium: Spotland Stadium; Attendance: 2,625; Referee: Oliver Langford

14 March 2015 34	Fleetwood Town	1–0	Rochdale	Fleetwood
15:00 GMT	Morris 59'; Evans (yellow card) 76'; Proctor (yellow card) 90'	Report	Cannon (yellow card) 14'	Stadium: Highbury Stadium (Fleetwood); Attendance: 3,822; Referee: Jeremy Simpson

17 March 2015 35	Notts County	1–2	Rochdale	Nottingham
	McCourt (yellow card) 17'; Thompson 59'; Adams (yellow card) 73'; Edwards (yellow card) 83'	Report	Henderson 35'; Dawson (yellow card) 47'; Vincenti 54'	Stadium: Meadow Lane; Attendance: 3,159; Referee: Richard Clark

21 March 2015 36	Rochdale	3–1	Scunthorpe United	Rochdale
	Rose 22'; Henderson 61'; Vincenti 84'	Report	van Veen 60'	Stadium: Spotland Stadium; Attendance: 2,738; Referee: Christopher Sarginson

24 March 2015 37	Oldham Athletic	3–0	Rochdale	Oldham
	Turner 30', 61'; Forte 58'; Brown (yellow card) 59'	Report		Stadium: Boundary Park; Attendance: 5,322; Referee: Darren Bond

28 March 2015 38	Rochdale	2–1	Yeovil Town	Rochdale
	Jones (yellow card) 20'; Bennett 51'; O'Connell 53'	Report	Arthurworrey (yellow card) 50'; Hayter 56' (yellow card) 80'; Ofori-Twumasi (yellow card) 77'	Stadium: Spotland Stadium; Attendance: 2,650; Referee: Eddie Ilderton

3 April 2015 39	Preston North End	1–0	Rochdale	Preston
	Beckford 36'	Report		Stadium: Deepdale; Attendance: 12,288; Referee: Andy Woolmer

6 April 2015 40	Rochdale	1–0	Port Vale	Rochdale
15:00	Vincenti (yellow card) 90+2'; Andrew 90+5'; Héry (yellow card) 90+5'	Report	Duffy (yellow card) 90+2'; Marshall (yellow card) 90+4'	Stadium: Spotland Stadium; Attendance: 2,948; Referee: Andy Haines

11 April 2015 41	Doncaster Rovers	1–1	Rochdale	Doncaster
15:00	Wabara (yellow card) 15'; Bennett 17'; Furman (yellow card) 61'	Report	Henderson 59'	Stadium: Keepmoat Stadium; Attendance: 5,695; Referee: Gavin Ward

14 April 2015 42	Rochdale	2–4	Swindon Town	Rochdale
19:45	Henderson 45' (pen.); Thompson 90' (o.g.)	Report	Gladwin 20', 33', 45' (pen.); Smith 23'; Hylton (yellow card) 90+1'	Stadium: Spotland Stadium; Attendance: 2,344; Referee: Nigel Miller

18 April 2015 43	Gillingham	1–0	Rochdale	Gillingham
15:00	Dack 14'; McDonald (yellow card) 38'; Loft (yellow card) 53'; McGlashan (yellow card) 66'	Report	Jones (red card) 63'; Lund (red card) 70'	Stadium: Priestfield Stadium; Attendance: 5,430; Referee: Andy D'Urso

21 April 2015 44	Rochdale	1–0	Leyton Orient	Rochdale
19:45	Kennedy (yellow card) 15'; Henderson 66'; Vincenti (yellow card) 74'	Report	Mooney (yellow card) 55'; Lowry (yellow card) 71'; Baudry (yellow card) 72'	Stadium: Spotland Stadium; Attendance: 1,914; Referee: Darren Drysdale

25 April 2015 45	Rochdale	2–3	Milton Keynes Dons	Rochdale
15:00	Bennett (yellow card) 41'; Cannon (yellow card) 61'; Vincenti 66'; Noble-Lazarus (yellow card) 79'; Henderson 86'	Report	Carruthers 16'; Spence (yellow card) 27'; Bowditch 29'; Powell 76'; Alli (yellow card) 84'; Grigg (yellow card) 90+4'	Stadium: Spotland Stadium; Attendance: 3,501; Referee: Michael Bull

3 May 2015 46	Barnsley	5–0	Rochdale	Barnsley
12:15	Scowen (yellow card) 40' (goal) 66', 76'; Holgate 84'; Winnall 90'; Hourihane 90'	Report	Rafferty (yellow card) 25' (yellow-red card) 48'	Stadium: Oakwell Stadium; Attendance: 9,593; Referee: David Webb

=== FA Cup ===
The draw for the first round of the FA Cup was made on 27 October 2014.

8 November 2014 1st round	Northampton Town	0–0	Rochdale	Northampton
15:00	Cresswell (yellow card) 45'; Newey (yellow card) 59'; Tozer (yellow card) 75'	Report	Henderson (red card) 15'; Lund (yellow card) 69'	Stadium: Sixfields Stadium; Attendance: 2,790; Referee: Kevin Johnson

18 November 2014 1st round replay	Rochdale	2–1	Northampton Town	Rochdale
19:45	Noble-Lazarus 85'; Lancashire 90+4'	Report	Toney 4'	Stadium: Spotland Stadium; Attendance: 1,717; Referee: Richard Clark

7 December 2014 2nd round	Aldershot Town	0–0	Rochdale	Aldershot
14:00	Williams (yellow card) 54'; Gibbs (yellow card) 84'	Report	Vincenti (yellow card) 84'	Stadium: Recreation Ground; Attendance: 3,143; Referee: Phil Gibbs

16 December 2014 2nd round replay	Rochdale	4–1	Aldershot Town	Rochdale
19:45	Done 31', 81', 88'; Vincenti 75'	Report	Finchett 73'; Forbes (yellow card) 90+1'	Stadium: Spotland Stadium; Attendance: 2,077; Referee: Mark Brown

3 January 2015 3rd round	Rochdale	1–0	Nottingham Forest	Rochdale
15:00	Vincenti 12' (pen.)	Report	Assombalonga (yellow card) 65'; Burke (yellow card) 86'	Stadium: Spotland Stadium; Attendance: 6,791; Referee: Gary Sutton

26 January 2015 4th round	Rochdale	1–4	Stoke City	Rochdale
20:00	Vincenti (yellow card) 28'; Bennett 78' (yellow card) 89'	Report	Bojan 4' (yellow card) 29'; Wilson (yellow card) 37'; Ireland 52'; Moses 61'; Sidwell (yellow card) 74'; Bardsley (yellow card) 77'; Walters 90'	Stadium: Spotland Stadium; Attendance: 7,443; Referee: (England) Martin Atkinson

=== League Cup ===
The draw for the first round was made on 17 June 2014 at 10am. Rochdale were drawn at home to Preston North End.

12 August 2014 Round One	Rochdale	0–2	Preston North End	Rochdale
19:45		Report	Little 43'; Kilkenny 48'	Stadium: Spotland Stadium; Attendance: 2,348; Referee: Mark Brown

=== Football League Trophy ===
2 September 2014 Round One	Crewe Alexandra	0–3	Rochdale	Crewe
19:30		Report	Done 42'; Vincenti 64'; Andrew 88'	Stadium: Gresty Road; Attendance: 1,529; Referee: Scott Duncan

7 October 2014 Round Two	Rochdale	0–1	Walsall	Rochdale
19:45	Henderson (yellow card) 90+4'	Report	Manset 23'; Grimes (yellow card) 45'; Purkiss (yellow card) 72'	Stadium: Spotland Stadium; Attendance: 1,156; Referee: Mark Heywood

== Transfers ==
=== In ===
No.	Pos.	Nat.	Name	Age	EU	Moving from	Type	Transfer window	Ends	Transfer fee	Source
4	DF	(Republic of Ireland)	Sean McGinty	20	EU	Sheffield United	Free transfer	Summer	2015	Free	
18	FW	(England)	Jack Muldoon	24	EU	Worksop Town	Free transfer	Summer	2015	Free	
9	FW	(England)	Calvin Andrew	27	EU	York City	Free transfer	Summer	2016	Free	
12	MF	(Republic of Ireland)	Stephen Dawson	28	EU	Barnsley	Free transfer	Summer	2015	Free	
33	DF	(England)	Tom Kennedy	29	EU	Barnsley	Free transfer	Summer	2015	Free	
10	FW	(England)	Febian Brandy	25	EU	Rotherham United	Free transfer	Winter	2015	Free	
11	FW	(Grenada)	Reuben Noble-Lazarus	21	EU	Barnsley	Transfer	Winter	2016	Undisclosed	

=== Out ===
No.	Pos.	Nat.	Name	Age	EU	Moving to	Type	Transfer window	Transfer fee	Source
—	FW	(Nigeria)	Godwin Abadaki	20	EU	Free agent	Released	Summer	Free	
4	DF	(England)	Peter Cavanagh	32	EU	Altrincham	Released	Summer	Free	
10	FW	(England)	Reece Gray	21	EU	Free agent	Released	Summer	Free	
19	FW	(England)	Craig Lynch	22	EU	Free agent	Released	Summer	Free	
15	MF	(England)	George Porter	21	EU	Dagenham & Redbridge	Released	Summer	Free	
21	GK	(Scotland)	Robbie Thomson	21	EU	Cowdenbeath (Scotland)	Released	Summer	Free	
11	FW	(England)	Scott Hogan	22	EU	Brentford	Transfer	Summer	£750,000	
—	DF	(England)	D'Arcy O'Connor	19	EU	Hyde	Released	Summer	Free	
—	MF	(England)	Connor Martin	17–18	EU	Accrington Stanley	Free transfer	Summer	Free	
19	FW	(England)	George Donnelly	26	EU	Tranmere Rovers	Transfer	Summer	Undisclosed	
16	MF	(England)	Matt Done	26	EU	Sheffield United	Transfer	Winter	Undisclosed	

EU = if holds or not a European Union passport; Country: when 2 flags, 1st flag = country that plays for internationally, 2nd flag = country of birth; N = number on jersey; P = Position (for position name, pause mouse pointer on abbreviation); Name = Name on jersey (for more extensive name, pause mouse pointer on name); Age = age on the day of the signing; Moving from = only indicate the club the player was playing before start playing for this club in this season, for the type of the moving see Status column; Moving to = only indicates the club the player is going to play next, for the type of the moving see Status column; Ends = when the player's current contract ends; n/a = Not applicable.

=== Loans in ===
No.	Pos.	Name	Country	Age	Loan club	Started	Ended	Start source	End source
22	GK	Conrad Logan	(Republic of Ireland)	28	Leicester City	18 August 2014	1 January 2015		
45	FW	Shamir Fenelon	(England)	20	Brighton & Hove Albion	29 August 2014	8 October 2014		
29	DF	Jack O'Connell	(England)	20	Blackburn Rovers	1 September 2014	6 January 2015		
11	FW	Reuben Noble-Lazarus	(Grenada)	21	Barnsley	27 October 2014	13 January 2015		
19	MF	Tomasz Cywka	(Poland)	26	Blackpool	26 November 2014	6 January 2015		
22	DF	Jack O'Connell	(England)	20	Brentford	10 January 2015	29 March 2015		
19	GK	Jamie Jones	(England)	26	Preston North End	26 February 2015	30 June 2015		

Sources: For loan start source see "Start source". For loan end source see "End source".
EU = if holds or not a European Union passport; Country: when 2 flags, 1st flag = country that plays for internationally, 2nd flag = country of birth; No. = number on jersey; P = Position (for position name, pause mouse pointer on abbreviation); Name = Name on jersey (for more extensive name, pause mouse pointer on name); In/Out = In: The player came in on loan, Out: The player went out on loan; Loan club = the club that the player moved on loan to or the club that the player came from on loan; Started = the date when the player's loan started; Ended = the date when the player's loan ended.

=== Loans out ===
No.	Pos.	Name	Country	Age	Loan club	Started	Ended	Start source	End source
33	DF	Tom Kennedy	(England)	29	Bury	23 October 2014	22 November 2014		
33	DF	Tom Kennedy	(England)	29	Blackpool	22 November 2014	14 January 2015		
18	FW	Jack Muldoon	(England)	25	FC Halifax Town	30 January 2015	30 June 2015		
4	DF	Sean McGinty	(Republic of Ireland)	21	Aldershot Town	20 February 2015	30 June 2015		

Sources: For loan start source see "Start source". For loan end source see "End source".
EU = if holds or not a European Union passport; Country: when 2 flags, 1st flag = country that plays for internationally, 2nd flag = country of birth; No. = number on jersey; P = Position (for position name, pause mouse pointer on abbreviation); Name = Name on jersey (for more extensive name, pause mouse pointer on name); In/Out = In: The player came in on loan, Out: The player went out on loan; Loan club = the club that the player moved on loan to or the club that the player came from on loan; Started = the date when the player's loan started; Ended = the date when the player's loan ended.
