= Joel Logan =

English footballer

Personal information
- Full name: Joel Alexander Logan
- Date of birth: 25 January 1995 (age 31)
- Place of birth: Manchester, England
- Position: Midfielder

Team information
- Current team: Hyde United

Senior career*
Years	Team	Apps	(Gls)
2012–2016	Rochdale	13	(0)
2014	→ Southport (loan)	4	(0)
2014	→ Stalybridge Celtic (loan)	2	(0)
2015	→ Wrexham (loan)	3	(0)
2016	Hednesford Town	?	(?)
2016–2017	Guiseley	9	(0)
2017	→ FC Halifax Town (loan)	1	(0)
2017–2019	FC United of Manchester	26	(1)
2018–2019	→ Hednesford Town (loan)		
2019–	Hyde United	3	(0)
- * Club domestic league appearances and goals as of 22:08, 21 December 2019 (UTC)

Joel Alexander Logan (born 25 January 1995) is an English professional footballer who plays as a midfielder.

== Club career ==
After progressing through the Rochdale youth system he was promoted to the first team squad whilst still a youth team player. He made his professional debut on 20 October 2012, in a 3–1 defeat to Plymouth Argyle in League Two, coming on as a substitute for Peter Cavanagh.

On 27 March 2014, Logan joined Conference North side Stalybridge Celtic on loan until the end of the 2013–14 season.

On 1 August 2015, Logan joined Wrexham on loan for a month.

For the 2016–17 season he played for Guiseley.

In July 2017 he joined FC United of Manchester. He later signed a contract taking him through to May 2019 with the club.

In December 2018 he joined Hednesford Town on loan for a month. Ahead of the 2019–20 season, Logan joined Hyde United.

== Career statistics ==
As of match played 1 January 2018

Appearances and goals by club, season and competition
Club	Season	League			FA Cup		League Cup		Other		Total	
Club	Season	Division	Apps	Goals	Apps	Goals	Apps	Goals	Apps	Goals	Apps	Goals
Rochdale	2012–13	League Two	5	0	0	0	0	0	0	0	5	0
Rochdale	2013–14	League Two	0	0	0	0	0	0	0	0	0	0
Rochdale	2014–15	League One	8	0	1	0	1	0	0	0	10	0
Rochdale	Rochdale total		13	0	1	0	1	0	0	0	15	0
Southport (loan)	2013–14	Conference Premier	4	0	0	0	—		1 (Note: Appearance in the FA Trophy)	0	5	0
Stalybridge Celtic (loan)	2013–14	Conference North	2	0	0	0	—		0	0	2	0
Wrexham (loan)	2015–16	Conference Premier	3	0	0	0	—		0	0	3	0
Guiseley	2016–17	National League	9	0	0	0	—		0	0	9	0
FC Halifax Town (loan)	2016–17	National League North	1	0	0	0	—		0	0	1	0
FC United of Manchester	2017–18	National League North	14	0	1	0	—		0	0	15	0
Career total			46	0	2	0	1	0	1	0	50	0
