= Matt Done =

British footballer (born 1988)

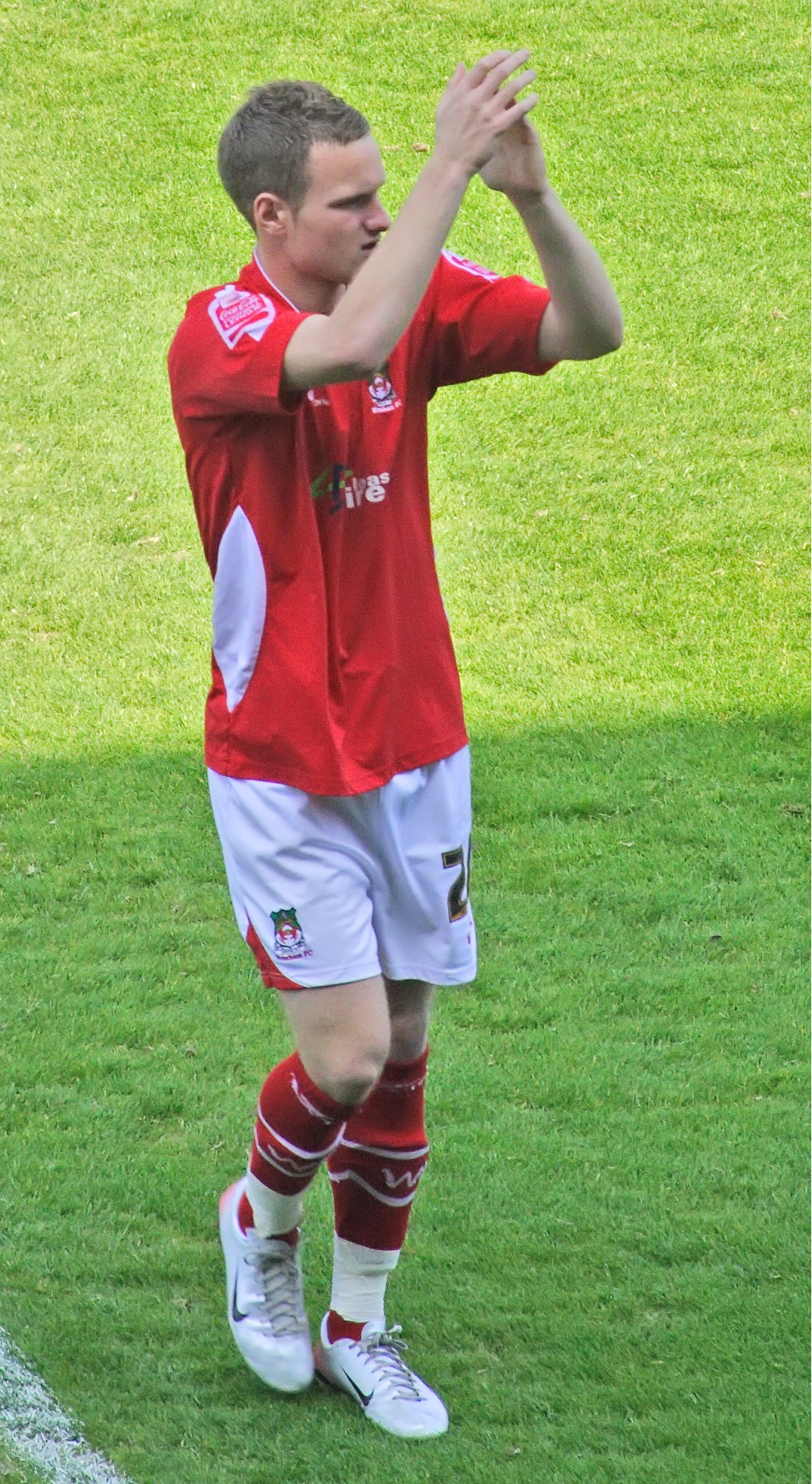
- Done playing for Wrexham in 2007

Personal information
- Full name: Matthew Done
- Date of birth: 22 July 1988 (age 38)
- Place of birth: Oswestry, England
- Height: 5 ft 10 in (1.78 m)
- Positions: Winger; striker

Team information
- Current team: Stockport County (first-team coach)

Youth career
- 2004–2005: Wrexham

Senior career*
Years	Team	Apps	(Gls)
2005–2008	Wrexham	66	(1)
2008–2010	Hereford United	56	(0)
2010–2011	Rochdale	33	(5)
2011–2013	Barnsley	44	(4)
2013	→ Hibernian (loan)	7	(0)
2013–2015	Rochdale	61	(10)
2015–2017	Sheffield United	77	(14)
2017–2022	Rochdale	168	(12)
Total		512	(46)

Managerial career
- 2024: Port Vale (joint-interim)
- * Club domestic league appearances and goals

Matthew Done (born 22 July 1988) is an English former professional footballer who is a coach at EFL League One club Stockport County. In a 17-year playing career, he scored 60 goals in 592 league and cup appearances, playing mostly as a winger or as a striker.

Done began his career at Wrexham, debuting at 17 in August 2005. He established himself in the first team during the 2006–07 and 2006–07 seasons but left the club following their relegation out of the English Football League. He joined Hereford United for an undisclosed fee and played 64 games throughout two seasons. He spent the 2010–11 campaign with Rochdale, where his performances earned him a move to Championship club Barnsley in June 2011. He made 47 appearances in two seasons, spending the latter half of the 2012–13 season on loan at Hibernian in the Scottish Premier League. Released by Barnsley, he rejoined Rochdale in July 2013.

He helped Rochdale to secure promotion out of League Two at the end of the 2013–14 season. He earned a move to League One rivals Sheffield United in February 2015. In two-and-a-half seasons with the club, he made 87 appearances and helped United to win promotion as champions of League One at the end of the 2016–17 campaign. He then joined Rochdale for a third spell in August 2017, where he would remain for another five seasons, making a further 200 appearances before his retirement at the end of the 2021–22 season.

He coached in the academy at Port Vale before being appointed joint interim coach of the first team in February 2024. He returned to Rochdale for a fourth time, this time as a coach, in July 2025.

== Early life ==
Matthew Done was born in Oswestry on 22 July 1988. He attended the Marches School and Technology College.

== Playing career ==
=== Wrexham ===
Done started his career at Wrexham through the Centre of Excellence in July 2004, and after progressing through the ranks at the club, he was called up to the first-team in the wake of the club's financial trouble. His debut came a month after his 17th birthday, as a substitute in a 1–0 defeat to Doncaster Rovers at the Racecourse Ground. He made his full debut on the last day of the 2005–06 season against Darlington. He made six appearances throughout the campaign and was offered a professional contract by manager Denis Smith.

Done broke into the first-team squad at the start of the 2006–07 season and scored his first goal for Wrexham in a 3–0 home win over Grimsby Town on 8 August. He went on to score in a 4–1 win at Sheffield Wednesday in the League Cup on 23 August. He recovered from an ankle injury, and finished the season with 38 appearances and two goals in all competitions.

In the 2007–08 season, Done remained a first-team regular. However, despite nursing injury concerns, he remained an unused substitute on several occasions this season. He was offered a new contract by Wrexham in May 2008 following the club's relegation to the Football Conference. However, Done left the club after rejecting the offer, with manager Brian Little admitting that Football League clubs had approached him.

=== Hereford United ===
On 17 June 2008, Done was signed by League One club Hereford United for an undisclosed fee, where manager Graham Turner had been an admirer for some time. Done made his Hereford United debut on the opening game of the 2008–09 season in a 2–1 loss at Leyton Orient. He scored his first goal at Edgar Street in a 2–1 defeat by Swindon Town in the Football League Trophy on 8 October. After losing his first-team place on several occasions during the season, Done managed to regain his first-team place and went on to make 39 appearances and score once in all competitions as the club were relegated into League Two.

Done started the opening game of the 2009–10 season against Morecambe and set up one of the goals in a 2–2 draw. However, he struggled to win starts and spent much of the season on the substitute bench, whilst he also struggled with injury concerns. As a result, Done made 25 appearances in all competitions and was released by the club at the expiry of his contract.

=== Rochdale ===
On 31 July 2010, Done signed a six-month contract for League One newcomers Rochdale. He made his Rochdale debut on 10 August, in the first round of the League Cup, in a 1–0 loss at Barnsley. He scored his first goal for the club in the Football League Trophy, in a 2–1 defeat at Port Vale on 31 August. On 27 November 2007, he scored again, in a 1–1 draw with Oldham Athletic. In December, he signed a contract to run until the end of the 2010–11 season. Done then scored two goals in two matches between 8 February and 12 February in wins over Bristol Rovers and Sheffield Wednesday. He went on to score goals against Carlisle United and Bournemouth. By the end of the 2010–11 season, Done had made 35 appearances, scoring five times in all competitions. On 16 May 2011, it was announced Matt had signed a new contract until the end of the 2011–12 season.

=== Barnsley ===
Just a month after signing a new contract with Rochdale, Done signed a two–year contract with Championship club Barnsley on 21 June 2011, along with Scott Wiseman. Done made his Barnsley debut in the first round of the League Cup on 9 August, where he played 27 minutes in a 2–0 loss against Morecambe. He scored his first goal for the club two weeks later, in a 2–1 win over Reading. However, he suffered injuries around September. After returning to the first-team against Bristol City on 29 October, he appeared in a handful of games and scored again on 26 December, in a 3–1 loss against Blackpool. Done went on to score two more goals later in the season against Derby County and Portsmouth. Despite suffering from another injury, Done played regularly during the 2011–12 season, making 33 appearances and scoring four times in all competitions.

Done suffered a knee injury early in the 2012–13 season. Barnsley then changed manager and new tactics meant that Done was surplus to requirements under new boss David Flitcroft. Up until leaving the club in January, Done went on to make 14 appearances in his second season for Barnsley.

On 31 January 2013, Done signed for Scottish Premier League club Hibernian on loan until the end of the 2012–13 season. Done scored his first goal for Pat Fenlon's "Hibees" on 3 March, in a 4–2 victory against Kilmarnock in the 2012–13 Scottish Cup. This was to be his only goal in nine appearances at Easter Road. Barnsley confirmed that Done would leave Oakwell at the end of his contract.

=== Return to Rochdale ===
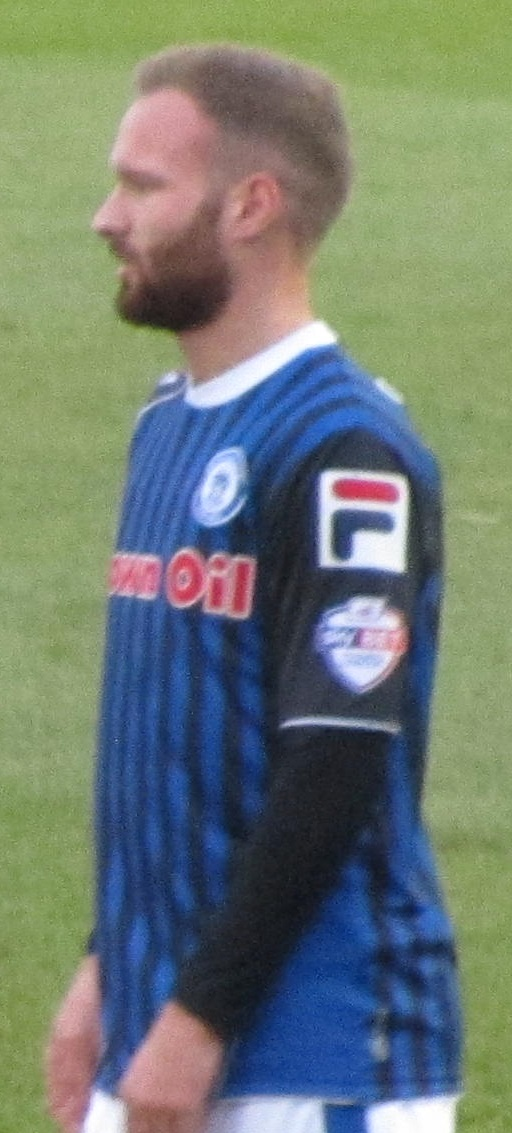
Done playing for Rochdale in 2013

Done re-signed for Rochdale on a one-year contract on 8 July 2013. He made his second debut for the club, coming on as a second-half substitute, in a 3–0 win over Hartlepool United in the opening game of the 2013–14 season. In a match against Wycombe Wanderers on 28 September, he set up two of Rochdale's three goals in a 3–2 win. Despite suffering setbacks due to injuries and suspension, Done played 38 times in Dale's promotion-winning season, and as a result he signed a new two-year contract on 27 May.

Done scored a hat-trick in a 5–2 win over Crewe Alexandra on 19 August 2014. For his performance, Done was named Football League's Team of the Week. He impressed once again on 6 September when he scored a goal and provided two assists in a 4–0 win over Crawley Town. Done went on to score regularly throughout 2014, including another hat–trick against Aldershot Town in the second round replay of FA Cup. In a 3–1 win over Doncaster Rovers on 22 November, he scored but was sent off in the second half for a foul on James Coppinger; the club launched an unsuccessful appeal against the suspension after the match. Done made 30 appearances and scored 10 times in all competitions in the first half of the 2014–15 campaign.

Following his move to Sheffield United, Done said that he loved playing every minute for Rochdale and he was emotional at the prospect of leaving Spotland. Manager Keith Hill admitted his departure benefited the club, saying it was "great business".

=== Sheffield United ===
On 2 February 2015, Matt Done signed a two-and-a-half-year deal with Sheffield United for an undisclosed fee. It was later reported that manager Nigel Clough had authorised a fee in the region of £500,000. Done scored on his Blades debut eight days later in a 4–1 victory over Colchester United at Bramall Lane. On 14 February, in his second match for United, Done scored a brace away at Bristol City in a 3–1 victory against the league leaders. He then went on a scoring spree when he scored against Notts County, Peterborough United, Fleetwood Town and Doncaster Rovers. In his first half-season at Sheffield United, Done made 14 appearances and scored seven times in all competitions.

Done injured his collarbone in the club's pre-season tour, and manager Nigel Adkins confirmed on Twitter that it was a broken collarbone, which would see him sidelined for the start of the new season. After returning to the training in late-September, Done scored on his first appearance of the 2015–16 season, in a 2–1 loss against Port Vale on 3 October. He scored again two weeks later in a 1–1 draw with Oldham Athletic. In the club's second meeting against Oldham Athletic on 5 December, in the second round of FA Cup, Done scored again, in a 1–0 win. After recovering from a hamstring injury he sustained against Bradford City on 28 December, Done scored twice on his return on 12 January, in a 3–3 draw with Wigan Athletic. He scored his fifth goal of the campaign on 5 March, in a 2–2 draw with Fleetwood Town. Since returning to the first-team in early-October, Done made 35 appearances and scored seven times in all competitions.

Ahead of the 2016–17 season, Done switched number shirts from 14 to 11 following the departure of Jose Baxter, who was released at the end of the 2015–16 season. Under the new management of Chris Wilder, Done began to play as a striker. Done went on to score two goals in two matches between 10 September and 17 September against Wimbledon and Peterborough United. As a result, it was reported by The Star that Done was among only a few players expected to be offered a new contract by Wilder. However, as the season progressed, Done's first-team opportunities soon became limited, due to his lack of his goal-scoring form, as well as Wilder's preference of striker Billy Sharp. As a result, Done was placed on the substitute bench for the rest of the season. On 14 April, he scored his third goal of the season, in a 3–0 win over Port Vale. Done made 35 appearances and scored three goals in the 2016–17 season as Sheffield United were promoted to Championship after six seasons in League One.

=== Third spell at Rochdale ===
After agreeing to a mutual termination of his contract with Sheffield United at the end of the 2016–2017 season, Done rejoined Rochdale on a two-year deal on 3 August 2017, announcing that he was "excited to be back". He made 57 appearances throughout the 2017–18 campaign, scoring eight goals.

He was offered a new contract by Rochdale at the end of the 2018–19 season, having scored two goals in 43 games. In June 2019, he signed a new two-year contract with the club, with manager Brian Barry-Murphy stated that the player still retained hunger and ambition. He played 31 games in the 2019–20 campaign, scoring one goal. He played 41 games in the 2020–21 season, scoring three goals, as Rochdale were relegated into League Two. On 21 June 2021, Done signed a new one-year contract with the club. The 2021–22 season would be his last as a professional, and he scored one goal in 28 matches to leave himself in the top ten of the club's all-time appearances list.

== Coaching career ==
Done was employed as a Player Development Phase Coach at Port Vale. He was put in interim charge of the first-team, along with fellow academy coaches Will Ryder and Danny Lloyd, on 6 February 2024, following the sacking of Andy Crosby. They took charge of two games before Darren Moore was appointed as the new manager on 13 February.

In July 2025, he returned to Rochdale as a first-team coach, joining former teammates Jimmy McNulty and Josh Lillis. In June 2026, Done followed McNulty to League One club Stockport County, once again being appointed first-team coach.

== Career statistics ==
=== Playing statistics ===
Appearances and goals by club, season and competition
Club	Season	League			National cup (Note: Includes FA Cup, Scottish Cup)		League cup (Note: Includes Football League Cup, Scottish League Cup)		Other		Total	
Club	Season	Division	Apps	Goals	Apps	Goals	Apps	Goals	Apps	Goals	Apps	Goals
Wrexham	2005–06	League Two	6	0	0	0	1	0	0	0	7	0
Wrexham	2006–07	League Two	34	1	2	0	1	1	2 (Note: One appearance in Football League Trophy, one appearance in FAW Premier Cup)	0	39	2
Wrexham	2007–08	League Two	26	0	1	0	1	0	1 (Note: Appearance(s) in Football League Trophy / EFL Trophy)	0	29	0
Wrexham	Total		66	1	3	0	3	1	3	0	75	2
Hereford United	2008–09	League One	36	0	1	0	1	0	1	1	39	1
Hereford United	2009–10	League Two	20	0	1	0	1	0	3	0	25	0
Hereford United	Total		56	0	2	0	2	0	4	1	64	1
Rochdale	2010–11	League One	33	5	0	0	2	0	1	1	36	6
Barnsley	2011–12	Championship	31	4	1	0	1	0	—		33	4
Barnsley	2012–13	Championship	13	0	0	0	1	0	—		14	0
Barnsley	Total		44	4	1	0	2	0	0	0	47	4
Hibernian (loan)	2012–13	Scottish Premier League	7	0	2	1	—		—		9	1
Rochdale	2013–14	League Two	38	0	4	0	1	0	1	0	44	0
Rochdale	2014–15	League One	23	10	5	3	0	0	2	1	30	14
Rochdale	Total		61	10	9	3	1	0	3	1	74	14
Sheffield United	2014–15	League One	15	7	0	0	—		2 (Note: Appearance(s) in League One play-offs)	1	17	8
Sheffield United	2015–16	League One	31	4	2	1	0	0	2	1	35	6
Sheffield United	2016–17	League One	31	3	0	0	1	0	3	0	35	3
Sheffield United	Total		77	14	2	1	1	0	7	2	87	17
Rochdale	2017–18	League One	46	6	7	2	2	0	2	0	57	8
Rochdale	2018–19	League One	36	2	2	0	1	0	4	0	43	2
Rochdale	2019–20	League One	24	0	4	0	2	1	1	0	31	1
Rochdale	2020–21	League One	37	3	0	0	2	0	2	0	41	3
Rochdale	2021–22	League Two	25	1	1	0	0	0	2	0	28	1
Rochdale	Total		168	12	14	2	7	1	11	0	200	15
Career total			512	46	33	7	18	2	29	5	592	60

=== Managerial statistics ===
As of match played 10 February 2024

Managerial record by team and tenure
Team	From	To	Record					Ref.
Team	From	To	P	W	D	L	Win %	Ref.
Port Vale (joint-interim manager)	6 February 2024	13 February 2024	2	0	1	1	0.0	
Total			2	0	1	1	0.0	

== Honours ==
Rochdale

- Football League Two third-place promotion: 2013–14

Sheffield United

- EFL League One: 2016–17
