= Jack O'Connell (English footballer) =

English association football player (born 1994)

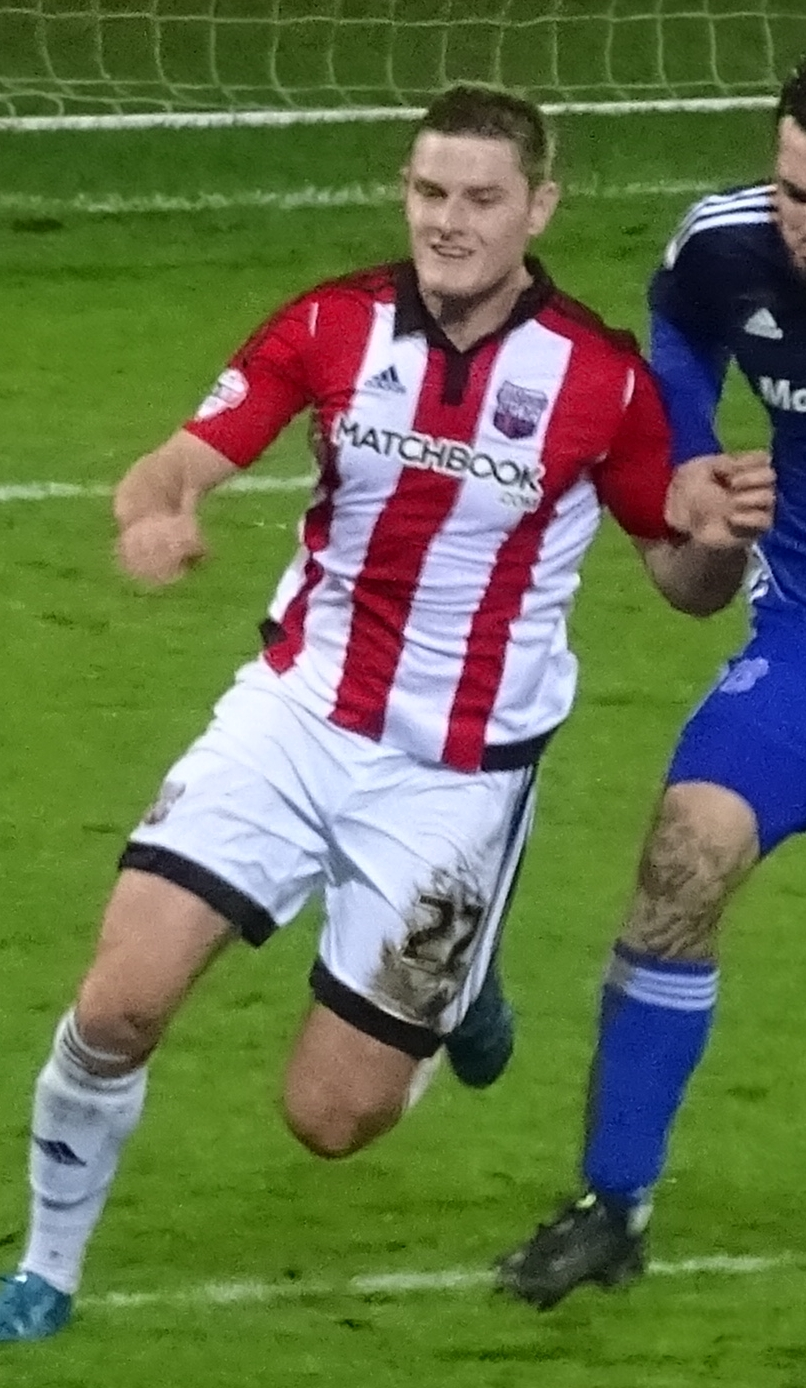
- O'Connell playing for Brentford in 2015

Personal information
- Full name: Jack William O'Connell
- Date of birth: 29 March 1994 (age 32)
- Place of birth: Liverpool, England
- Height: 6 ft 3 in (1.90 m)
- Position: Centre-back

Youth career
- 2010–2011: Litherland REMYCA
- 2011–2012: Blackburn Rovers

Senior career*
Years	Team	Apps	(Gls)
2012–2015	Blackburn Rovers	0	(0)
2012–2013	→ Rotherham United (loan)	3	(0)
2013	→ York City (loan)	18	(0)
2013–2014	→ Rochdale (loan)	38	(0)
2014–2015	→ Rochdale (loan)	17	(3)
2015–2016	Brentford	16	(1)
2015	→ Rochdale (loan)	12	(2)
2016–2023	Sheffield United	166	(7)
Total		270	(13)

International career
2012	England U18	1	(0)
2012–2013	England U19	8	(0)
- * Club domestic league appearances and goals

Jack William O'Connell (born 29 March 1994) is an English former professional footballer who played as a centre-back.

O'Connell began his career at Blackburn Rovers and came to prominence after captaining Rochdale to promotion from League Two in the 2013–14 season. He joined Championship club Brentford in February 2015, and remained there until July 2016 when signing for Sheffield United of League One. O'Connell was capped by England at under-18 and under-19 level, captaining the latter team.

== Early and personal life ==
O'Connell was born in Liverpool, Merseyside, and was raised by his mother along with his three brothers. He moved to Málaga, Spain, with his family during his childhood, where he lived for four years before returning to England. He was a boyhood fan of Liverpool O'Connell is in a relationship with women's footballer Alex Greenwood, the two having met at Cardinal Heenan High School where O'Connell was attending sixth form.

== Club career ==
=== Early years ===
O'Connell began his career with the youth team at Liverpool County Premier League Premier Division club REMYCA United at the age of 16. He made seven appearances in the first team before being named their Youth Player of the Year for the 2010–11 season.

=== Blackburn Rovers ===
After having trials with Premier League clubs Everton and Blackburn Rovers, O'Connell was signed by the academy of the latter on a two-year contract in the summer of 2011. A left-sided centre-back and left-back, he made 35 appearances and scored three goals for the academy and reserve teams during 2011–12 and was part of the academy team which reach the finals of the FA Youth Cup and the Premier Academy League. O'Connell signed a two-year professional contract with Rovers in May 2012.

After impressing on loan away from Ewood Park during the 2012–13 and 2013–14 seasons, O'Connell signed a new two-year contract in the summer of 2014. O'Connell received his maiden call into the first team squad on 12 August 2014, being named in the starting line-up for a League Cup first round match versus Scunthorpe United. He played the full 90 minutes of the 1–0 defeat. He was called into the squad for the club's next two Championship matches, before departing on loan. After his return, O'Connell's final involvement with the first team came on 3 January 2015, when he remained an unused substitute for a 2–1 FA Cup third round victory over Charlton Athletic. He departed Rovers on 2 February 2015, after making just one first team appearance in three and a half years at Ewood Park. He made 49 appearances and scored three goals for the club's reserve and academy teams.

==== Rotherham United (loan) ====
On 22 November 2012, O'Connell signed on loan for League Two club Rotherham United until 5 January 2013. O'Connell made the first senior appearance of his career on 24 November 2012, replacing Courtney Cameron in the 89th minute of a 1–0 away win against Exeter City. He made five appearances for Rotherham before returning to Blackburn.

==== York City (loan) ====
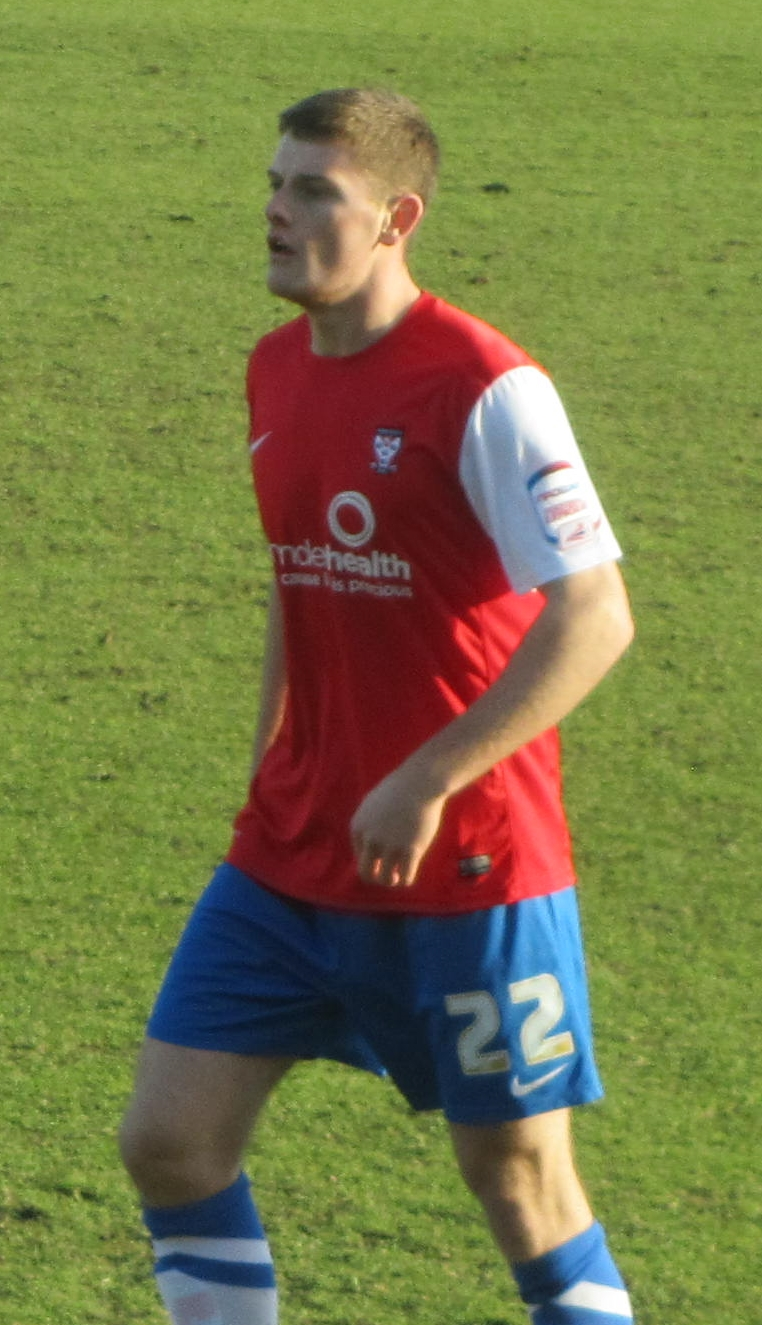
O'Connell playing for York City in 2013

O'Connell joined another League Two team, York City, on a one-month loan on 24 January 2013. He made his debut two days later in a 1–1 draw away to Gillingham. The loan was extended until the end of 2012–13 on 25 February 2013. O'Connell made 18 appearances for York before returning to Blackburn after his loan expired.

==== Rochdale (loans) ====
O'Connell signed for League Two team Rochdale on 22 July 2013 on a six-month loan. Consistently good displays saw manager Keith Hill extend O'Connell's loan until the end of 2013–14 in December 2013. He was also named captain by Hill. O'Connell made 45 appearances as Rochdale earned automatic promotion to League One after finishing third in League Two.

On 1 September 2014, O'Connell rejoined Rochdale on a loan running until 3 January 2015. He scored the first senior goal of his career with a header in a 3–0 win over Yeovil Town on 25 October 2014. O'Connell returned to Blackburn Rovers after his loan expired, having made 19 appearances and scored three goals during his spell with Rochdale. Across his two spells at Spotland, O'Connell made 64 appearances and scored three goals.

=== Brentford ===
On 2 February 2015, O'Connell signed for Championship club Brentford on a three-and-a-half-year contract. After a spell away on loan, he was an unused substitute on four occasions before the end of 2014–15. O'Connell made his long-awaited debut with a start at left back in Brentford's second match of 2015–16, a 4–0 League Cup first round defeat to Oxford United. A suspension to Harlee Dean in late November saw O'Connell come into the team and he headed his first Brentford goal to level the score at 2–2 in a West London derby with Fulham on 12 December. Despite the departure of first-choice centre-back James Tarkowski in January 2016, O'Connell remained as third-choice centre-back after being usurped by Yoann Barbet. He made sporadic appearances through to the end of the season and finished with eighteen appearances and one goal.

==== Return to Rochdale (loan) ====
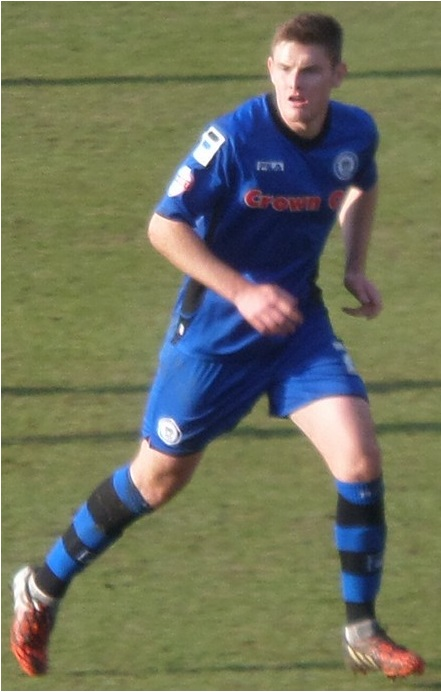
O'Connell playing for Rochdale in 2015

On 10 February 2015, O'Connell returned to League One team Rochdale on loan until the end of 2014–15. He made his third debut for the club in a 2–1 defeat to Peterborough United four days later. He made 12 appearances and scored two goals before being recalled by Brentford on 28 March. Earlier in the day he had celebrated the 100th professional appearance of his career with the winner in a 2–1 victory over Yeovil Town. Over the course of his three spells with Rochdale, O'Connell made 76 appearances and scored five goals.

=== Sheffield United ===
O'Connell signed for then League One club Sheffield United on 8 July 2016 on a three-year contract for an undisclosed fee. He scored his first goal for Sheffield United in an EFL Trophy tie against Grimsby Town on 9 November 2016. O'Connell made 50 appearances, scoring 6 goals, as Sheffield United were promoted to the Championship as League One champions. On 15 November 2017, O'Connell signed a new four-and-a-half-year contract with Sheffield United, keeping him at Bramall Lane until June 2022. On 28 April 2019 he saw his second promotion in three seasons with United, this time to the Premier League. As part of manager Chris Wilder's system, O'Connell would play as an outside centre-back, overlapping the wing-back to get into a crossing position.

=== Retirement ===
On 21 July 2023, O'Connell announced via his social media accounts that he would be retiring from football at the age of 29. O'Connell cited his knee injuries as the main reason for his retirement, among other complex reasons and decisions, and stated that "Walking away from football will leave a void in my life – but I have made peace with it. And I am grateful for the games I have played, the moments I lived out on the pitch, and to my team-mates – many of whom will be friends for life. It was all a dream come true."

== International career ==
O'Connell was capped once by the England under-18 team, playing the full 90 minutes of a 3–0 friendly victory over Poland on 7 March 2012. He made his debut for the under-19s in a 3–0 2013 UEFA European Under-19 Championship qualification win over Estonia on 26 September 2012. O'Connell won four further caps during the qualifying round, including three as captain. He won eight caps at under-19 level.

== Career statistics ==
As of end of 2020–21 season

Appearances and goals by club, season and competition
Club	Season	League			FA Cup		League Cup		Other		Total	
Club	Season	Division	Apps	Goals	Apps	Goals	Apps	Goals	Apps	Goals	Apps	Goals
Blackburn Rovers	2012–13	Championship	0	0	—		0	0	—		0	0
Blackburn Rovers	2014–15	Championship	0	0	0	0	1	0	—		1	0
Blackburn Rovers	Total		0	0	0	0	1	0	—		1	0
Rotherham United (loan)	2012–13	League Two	3	0	2	0	—		—		5	0
York City (loan)	2012–13	League Two	18	0	—		—		—		18	0
Rochdale (loan)	2013–14	League Two	38	0	4	0	1	0	2 (Note: Appearances in Football League Trophy)	0	45	0
Rochdale (loan)	2014–15	League One	29	5	—		—		2	0	31	5
Rochdale (loan)	Total		67	5	4	0	1	0	4	0	76	5
Brentford	2014–15	Championship	0	0	—		—		0	0	0	0
Brentford	2015–16	Championship	16	1	1	0	1	0	—		18	1
Brentford	Total		16	1	1	0	1	0	0	0	18	1
Sheffield United	2016–17	League One	44	4	2	1	1	0	3 (Note: Appearances in EFL Trophy)	1	50	6
Sheffield United	2017–18	Championship	46	0	1	0	1	0	—		48	0
Sheffield United	2018–19	Championship	41	3	0	0	1	0	—		42	3
Sheffield United	2019–20	Premier League	33	0	2	0	0	0	—		35	0
Sheffield United	2020–21	Premier League	2	0	0	0	0	0	—		2	0
Sheffield United	2021–22	Championship	0	0	0	0	0	0	—		0	0
Sheffield United	Total		166	7	5	1	3	0	3	1	177	9
Career total			270	13	12	1	6	0	7	1	296	15

== Honours ==
Sheffield United

- EFL League One: 2016–17
- EFL Championship second-place promotion: 2018–19
