= Jamie Allen (footballer, born January 1995) =

English footballer

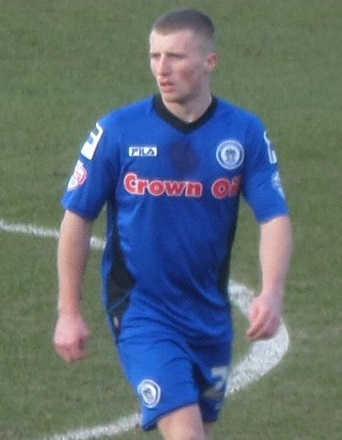
- Allen playing for Rochdale in 2015

Personal information
- Full name: Jamie Paul Allen
- Date of birth: 29 January 1995 (age 31)
- Place of birth: Rochdale, England
- Height: 5 ft 8 in (1.72 m)
- Position: Midfielder

Team information
- Current team: Rochdale
- Number: 24

Youth career
- 2003–2013: Rochdale

Senior career*
Years	Team	Apps	(Gls)
2013–2017	Rochdale	133	(11)
2017–2019	Burton Albion	71	(8)
2019–2026	Coventry City	174	(11)
2026–	Rochdale	0	(0)
- * Club domestic league appearances and goals as of 16:17 November 13th 2026(UTC)

Jamie Paul Allen (born 29 January 1995) is an English professional footballer who currently plays as a midfielder for League Two club Rochdale.

== Career ==
=== Rochdale ===
Born in Rochdale, Greater Manchester, Allen joined Rochdale's youth system in 2003, aged eight. After being instrumental in the Academy (being also shortlisted for League Two Apprentice of The Year), he signed a professional deal in 2013 summer.

Allen made his professional debut on 8 October, starting in a 1–0 win against Port Vale. He has been compared to Manchester United and England midfielder Paul Scholes. He made his league debut four days later, starting in a 3–0 home win over Newport County, hitting the bar in the lead-up to the second goal.

Allen scored his first professional goal on 2 November, but in a 2–1 home loss against AFC Wimbledon. On 27 June 2014, he signed a new two-year contract with Rochdale. On 7 August 2015, Allen was named captain of Rochdale.

=== Burton Albion ===
On 31 August 2017, Allen joined Championship club Burton Albion. He scored his first goal for Burton in a 2–1 win over Barnsley on 20 February 2018.

=== Coventry City ===
Allen signed a three-year contract with League One club Coventry City on 28 June 2019 for an undisclosed fee.

After injuries hampered the start of his time with The Sky Blues, Allen finally made his first League appearance for the club off the bench in a 1–1 draw with Sunderland.

Allen would go on to make a further 10 appearances before the season was curtailed due to the COVID-19 pandemic. Coventry were crowned Champions of League One and Allen picked up a winners medal.

In 2020–21, Allen was used mainly as a squad player as Coventry competed in The Championship for the first time in 8 years. His only goal of the season come in a 2–0 win against Sheffield Wednesday.

Allen became a key player in the Sky Blues squad in the 2021–22 and impressed with his energetic box to box midfield performances. His fine form throughout the campaign earned him a new contract until July 2024 His only goal of the 2021–22 season came in a 2–1 win against Reading at The Coventry Building Society Arena.

On February 6, 2024, Allen suffered a fractured cheekbone as a result of a challenge from Di'Shon Bernard of Sheffield Wednesday during a FA Cup 4th-round replay which Coventry won 4–1.

Following Coventry's title-winning campaign, he was released upon the expiry of his contract at the end of the 2025–26 season.

On 13 November 2026, he returned to Rochdale following his contract expiry at Coventry City.

== Career statistics ==
As of match played on 2 May 2026

Appearances and goals by club, season and competition
Club	Season	League			FA Cup		League Cup		Other		Total	
Club	Season	Division	Apps	Goals	Apps	Goals	Apps	Goals	Apps	Goals	Apps	Goals
Rochdale	2012–13	League Two	0	0	0	0	0	0	0	0	0	0
Rochdale	2013–14	League Two	25	6	2	0	0	0	2 (Note: Appearances in Football League Trophy)	0	29	6
Rochdale	2014–15	League One	35	0	4	0	0	0	2	0	41	0
Rochdale	2015–16	League One	38	3	0	0	2	0	0	0	40	3
Rochdale	2016–17	League One	31	2	2	0	2	0	2 (Note: Appearances in the EFL Trophy)	0	37	2
Rochdale	2017–18	League One	4	0	—		0	0	—		4	0
Rochdale	Total		133	11	8	0	4	0	6	0	151	11
Burton Albion	2017–18	Championship	29	1	0	0	1	0	—		30	1
Burton Albion	2018–19	League One	42	7	1	0	4	1	3	0	50	8
Burton Albion	Total		71	8	1	0	5	1	3	0	80	9
Coventry City	2019–20	League One	11	1	4	0	0	0	1	0	16	1
Coventry City	2020–21	Championship	22	1	0	0	1	0	—		23	1
Coventry City	2021–22	Championship	38	1	2	0	1	0	—		41	1
Coventry City	2022–23	Championship	37	6	1	0	1	1	3 (Note: Appearances in the EFL Championship play-offs)	0	42	7
Coventry City	2023–24	Championship	22	1	3	0	0	0	0	0	25	1
Coventry City	2024–25	Championship	21	0	2	0	3	0	2	0	28	0
Coventry City	2025–26	Championship	23	1	0	0	2	0	—		25	1
Coventry City	Total		174	11	12	0	8	1	6	0	200	12
Career total			378	30	21	0	17	2	15	0	431	32

== Honours ==
Coventry City

- EFL Championship: 2025–26
- EFL League One: 2019–20
