= 2018–19 Rochdale A.F.C. season =

English football club season

Rochdale
2018–19 season
- Chairman: Chris Dunphy
- Manager: Keith Hill (until 4 March); Brian Barry-Murphy (from 3 April)
- Stadium: Spotland
- League One: 16th
- FA Cup: Second round
- EFL Cup: Second round
- EFL Trophy: Third round
- Top goalscorer: League: Ian Henderson (15); All: Ian Henderson (16)
- Highest home attendance: 6,546 (6 Apr 2019 vs. Sunderland)
- Lowest home attendance: 615 (7 Nov 2018 vs. Leicester City U21)
- Average home league attendance: 3,574
- Biggest win: 3–0 (15 Sep 2018 vs. Gillingham)
- Biggest defeat: 0–5 (1 Jan 2019 at Doncaster Rovers)
| Home colours | Away colours | Third colours |

The 2018–19 season was Rochdale A.F.C.'s 112th in existence and their fifth consecutive season in League One. Along with competing in League One, the club participated in the FA Cup, EFL Cup and EFL Trophy. The season covers the period from 1 July 2018 to 30 June 2019.

== First-team squad ==
| No. | Name | Pos. | Nat. | Place of birth | Age | Apps | Goals | Signed from | Date signed | Fee | Ends |
|---|---|---|---|---|---|---|---|---|---|---|---|
Goalkeepers
| 1 | Josh Lillis | GK | (England) | Derby | 39 | 297 | 0 | Scunthorpe United | 1 July 2012 | Free | 2020 |
| 24 | Magnus Norman | GK | (England) | London | 29 | 12 | 0 | Fulham | 15 August 2018 | Loan | 2019 |
| 31 | Bradley Wade | GK | (England) | | 18 | 0 | 0 | Academy | 1 July 2018 | Trainee | 2019 |
Defenders
| 2 | Ryan McLaughlin | RB | (Northern Ireland) | Belfast | 32 | 2 | 0 | Blackpool | 23 January 2019 | Undisclosed | 2020 |
| 3 | Kgosi Ntlhe | LB | (South Africa) | Pretoria | 32 | 44 | 1 | Stevenage | 1 July 2017 | Free | 2019 |
| 4 | Jimmy McNulty | CB | (England) | Runcorn | 41 | 161 | 3 | Bury | 1 July 2015 | Free | 2019 |
| 5 | Ryan Delaney | CB | (Republic of Ireland) | Wexford | 30 | 53 | 4 | Burton Albion | 9 January 2018 | Undisclosed | 2021 |
| 6 | Ethan Ebanks-Landell | CB | (England) | West Bromwich | 33 | 4 | 1 | Wolverhampton Wanderers | 11 January 2019 | Loan | 2019 |
| 39 | Joe Bunney | LB | (England) | Gorton | 33 | 145 | 17 | Northampton Town | 31 January 2019 | Loan | 2019 |
| 41 | Luke Matheson | RB | (England) | | 24 | 6 | 0 | Academy | 1 July 2018 | Trainee | Undisclosed |
Midfielders
| 7 | Stephen Dooley | RM | (Northern Ireland) | Ballymoney | 35 | 17 | 1 | Coleraine | 1 July 2018 | Free | 2020 |
| 8 | Michael J. Williams | DM | (Wales) | Bangor | 31 | 40 | 0 | Liverpool | 1 July 2018 | Free | 2020 |
| 10 | Callum Camps | CM | (Northern Ireland) (England) | Tameside | 30 | 187 | 22 | Academy | 1 July 2013 | Trainee | 2020 |
| 14 | Oliver Rathbone | CM | (England) | Blackburn | 30 | 99 | 8 | Manchester United | 1 July 2015 | Free | 2019 |
| 15 | Joe Thompson | RM | (England) | Rochdale | 37 | 203 | 21 | Carlisle United | 7 August 2016 | Free | 2019 |
| 16 | Matt Done | LM | (England) | Oswestry | 38 | 196 | 30 | Sheffield United | 3 August 2017 | Free | 2019 |
| 19 | Brad Inman | CM | (Australia) | Adelaide | 34 | 73 | 12 | Peterborough United | 4 July 2018 | Free | 2019 |
| 25 | Daniel Adshead | CM | (England) | Manchester | 25 | 23 | 1 | Academy | 1 July 2017 | Free | 2019 |
| 27 | Ethan Hamilton | CM | (Scotland) | | 28 | 4 | 2 | Manchester United | 11 January 2019 | Loan | 2019 |
| 28 | Aaron Morley | CM | (England) | Bury | 26 | 12 | 0 | Academy | 1 March 2017 | Trainee | 2019 |
Forwards
| 9 | Calvin Andrew | CF | (England) | Luton | 39 | 191 | 28 | York City | 25 July 2014 | Free | 2020 |
| 11 | Jordan Williams | LW/CF | (England) | Warrington | 33 | 40 | 3 | Barrow | 1 July 2017 | Undisclosed | 2019 |
| 18 | Aaron Wilbraham | CF | (England) | Knutsford | 47 | 15 | 1 | Bolton Wanderers | 1 July 2018 | Free | 2019 |
| 23 | Rory Holden | CF | (Northern Ireland) | | 29 | 6 | 0 | Bristol City | 3 January 2019 | Loan | 2019 |
| 30 | Rekeil Pyke | CF | (England) | Leeds | 29 | 1 | 0 | Huddersfield Town | 30 January 2019 | Loan | 2019 |
| 36 | Matty Gillam | CF | (England) | Bexley | 28 | 27 | 5 | Academy | 1 July 2016 | Trainee | 2020 |
| 40 | Ian Henderson | CF | (England) | Bury St Edmunds | 41 | 290 | 105 | Colchester United | 1 July 2013 | Free | 2020 |

=== Statistics ===
As of 30 June 2019

| No. | Pos | Nat | Player | Total | | League One | | FA Cup | | League Cup | | League Trophy | |
| No. | Pos | Nat | Player | Apps | Goals | Apps | Goals | Apps | Goals | Apps | Goals | Apps | Goals |
|---|---|---|---|---|---|---|---|---|---|---|---|---|---|
| 1 | GK | (England) ENG | Josh Lillis | 28 | 0 | 25+1 | 0 | 1+0 | 0 | 1+0 | 0 | 0+0 | 0 |
| 2 | DF | (Northern Ireland) NIR | Ryan McLaughlin | 13 | 0 | 13+0 | 0 | 0+0 | 0 | 0+0 | 0 | 0+0 | 0 |
| 3 | DF | (South Africa) RSA | Kgosi Ntlhe | 23 | 3 | 14+5 | 3 | 0+0 | 0 | 2+0 | 0 | 2+0 | 0 |
| 4 | DF | (Scotland) SCO | Jimmy McNulty | 28 | 3 | 24+0 | 1 | 0+0 | 0 | 1+0 | 0 | 3+0 | 2 |
| 5 | DF | (Republic of Ireland) IRL | Ryan Delaney | 34 | 2 | 28+1 | 1 | 2+0 | 0 | 2+0 | 1 | 1+0 | 0 |
| 6 | DF | (England) ENG | Ethan Ebanks-Landell | 16 | 2 | 15+1 | 2 | 0+0 | 0 | 0+0 | 0 | 0+0 | 0 |
| 7 | MF | (Northern Ireland) NIR | Stephen Dooley | 27 | 1 | 16+6 | 0 | 2+0 | 0 | 0+1 | 0 | 2+0 | 1 |
| 8 | MF | (Wales) WAL | Jordan Williams | 32 | 0 | 21+6 | 0 | 1+0 | 0 | 1+0 | 0 | 3+0 | 0 |
| 9 | FW | (England) ENG | Calvin Andrew | 43 | 4 | 13+25 | 3 | 1+1 | 0 | 2+0 | 0 | 1+0 | 1 |
| 10 | MF | (Northern Ireland) NIR | Callum Camps | 42 | 3 | 38+1 | 3 | 1+0 | 0 | 1+1 | 0 | 0+0 | 0 |
| 11 | FW | (England) ENG | Jordan Williams | 23 | 3 | 11+7 | 2 | 2+0 | 0 | 0+0 | 0 | 3+0 | 1 |
| 13 | MF | (Republic of Ireland) IRL | Jimmy Keohane | 8 | 0 | 4+4 | 0 | 0+0 | 0 | 0+0 | 0 | 0+0 | 0 |
| 14 | MF | (England) ENG | Oliver Rathbone | 31 | 6 | 25+2 | 4 | 0+0 | 0 | 1+0 | 2 | 3+0 | 0 |
| 16 | MF | (England) ENG | Matt Done | 42 | 2 | 26+9 | 2 | 2+0 | 0 | 0+1 | 0 | 4+0 | 0 |
| 18 | FW | (England) ENG | Aaron Wilbraham | 25 | 4 | 16+7 | 4 | 0+0 | 0 | 0+1 | 0 | 0+1 | 0 |
| 19 | MF | (Australia) AUS | Brad Inman | 32 | 4 | 14+13 | 4 | 1+0 | 0 | 1+0 | 0 | 1+2 | 0 |
| 23 | FW | (England) ENG | Rory Holden | 6 | 0 | 5+0 | 0 | 0+0 | 0 | 0+0 | 0 | 1+0 | 0 |
| 24 | GK | (England) ENG | Andy Lonergan | 7 | 0 | 7+0 | 0 | 0+0 | 0 | 0+0 | 0 | 0+0 | 0 |
| 25 | MF | (England) ENG | Daniel Adshead | 16 | 1 | 8+2 | 0 | 1+0 | 0 | 0+0 | 0 | 4+1 | 1 |
| 26 | FW | (England) ENG | Zach Clough | 13 | 1 | 4+5 | 0 | 0+1 | 0 | 0+0 | 0 | 2+1 | 1 |
| 27 | MF | (Scotland) SCO | Ethan Hamilton | 14 | 4 | 13+1 | 4 | 0+0 | 0 | 0+0 | 0 | 0+0 | 0 |
| 28 | MF | (England) ENG | Aaron Morley | 6 | 0 | 2+0 | 0 | 0+0 | 0 | 0+0 | 0 | 4+0 | 0 |
| 30 | FW | (England) ENG | Rekeil Pyke | 6 | 0 | 3+3 | 0 | 0+0 | 0 | 0+0 | 0 | 0+0 | 0 |
| 36 | FW | (England) ENG | Matty Gillam | 13 | 2 | 5+4 | 1 | 0+0 | 0 | 0+1 | 0 | 2+1 | 1 |
| 39 | DF | (England) ENG | Joe Bunney | 16 | 0 | 12+4 | 0 | 0+0 | 0 | 0+0 | 0 | 0+0 | 0 |
| 40 | FW | (England) ENG | Ian Henderson | 47 | 21 | 43+0 | 20 | 2+0 | 1 | 2+0 | 0 | 0+0 | 0 |
| 41 | DF | (England) ENG | Luke Matheson | 7 | 0 | 0+3 | 0 | 0+0 | 0 | 0+0 | 0 | 3+1 | 0 |
| 42 | MF | (England) ENG | Florent Hoti | 2 | 0 | 0+0 | 0 | 0+0 | 0 | 0+0 | 0 | 1+1 | 0 |
| 44 | DF | (England) ENG | Juwon Hamzat | 1 | 0 | 0+0 | 0 | 0+0 | 0 | 0+0 | 0 | 1+0 | 0 |
| 45 | FW | (England) ENG | Florian Yonsian | 3 | 0 | 0+0 | 0 | 0+0 | 0 | 0+0 | 0 | 1+2 | 0 |
| 46 | DF | (England) ENG | Harrison Hopper | 1 | 0 | 0+0 | 0 | 0+0 | 0 | 0+0 | 0 | 0+1 | 0 |
| 49 | FW | (England) ENG | Lewis Bradley | 1 | 0 | 0+1 | 0 | 0+0 | 0 | 0+0 | 0 | 0+0 | 0 |
Players who left the club during the season:
| 2 | DF | (Republic of Ireland) IRL | Joe Rafferty | 31 | 1 | 24+1 | 0 | 2+0 | 0 | 1+1 | 0 | 1+1 | 1 |
| 6 | DF | (England) ENG | Harrison McGahey | 27 | 0 | 21+0 | 0 | 2+0 | 0 | 2+0 | 0 | 2+0 | 0 |
| 12 | DF | (England) ENG | Connor Randall | 3 | 0 | 1+0 | 0 | 0+0 | 0 | 1+0 | 0 | 1+0 | 0 |
| 15 | MF | (England) ENG | Joe Thompson | 1 | 0 | 0+1 | 0 | 0+0 | 0 | 0+0 | 0 | 0+0 | 0 |
| 17 | MF | (England) ENG | David Perkins | 21 | 0 | 11+6 | 0 | 0+1 | 0 | 1+0 | 0 | 2+0 | 0 |
| 21 | MF | (England) ENG | Sam Hart | 13 | 0 | 11+0 | 0 | 1+0 | 0 | 0+0 | 0 | 1+0 | 0 |
| 22 | GK | (United States) USA | Brendan Moore | 10 | 0 | 7+1 | 0 | 1+0 | 0 | 0+0 | 0 | 1+0 | 0 |
| 23 | DF | (Republic of Ireland) IRL | James Finnerty | 1 | 0 | 0+0 | 0 | 0+0 | 0 | 0+0 | 0 | 0+1 | 0 |
| 24 | GK | (England) ENG | Mangus Norman | 12 | 0 | 6+1 | 0 | 0+0 | 0 | 1+0 | 0 | 4+0 | 0 |
| 27 | MF | (England) ENG | Andy Cannon | 16 | 1 | 4+8 | 0 | 0+1 | 0 | 2+0 | 0 | 1+0 | 1 |

=== Goals record ===
As of 30 June 2019

| Rank | No. | Nat. | Po. | Name | League One | FA Cup | League Cup | League Trophy | Total |
|---|---|---|---|---|---|---|---|---|---|
| 1 | 40 | (England) | CF | Ian Henderson | 20 | 1 | 0 | 0 | 21 |
| 2 | 14 | (England) | CM | Oliver Rathbone | 4 | 0 | 2 | 0 | 6 |
| 3 | 9 | (England) | CF | Calvin Andrew | 3 | 0 | 0 | 1 | 4 |
| 3 | 18 | (England) | CF | Aaron Wilbraham | 4 | 0 | 0 | 0 | 4 |
| 3 | 19 | (Australia) | AM | Brad Inman | 4 | 0 | 0 | 0 | 4 |
| 3 | 27 | (Scotland) | CM | Ethan Hamilton | 4 | 0 | 0 | 0 | 4 |
| 7 | 3 | (South Africa) | LB | Kgosi Ntlhe | 3 | 0 | 0 | 0 | 3 |
| 7 | 4 | (Scotland) | CB | Jimmy McNulty | 1 | 0 | 0 | 2 | 3 |
| 7 | 10 | (Northern Ireland) | CM | Callum Camps | 3 | 0 | 0 | 0 | 3 |
| 7 | 11 | (England) | LW | Jordan Williams | 2 | 0 | 0 | 1 | 3 |
| 11 | 5 | (Republic of Ireland) | CB | Ryan Delaney | 1 | 0 | 1 | 0 | 2 |
| 11 | 6 | (England) | CB | Ethan Ebanks-Landell | 2 | 0 | 0 | 0 | 2 |
| 11 | 16 | (England) | LM | Matt Done | 2 | 0 | 0 | 0 | 2 |
| 11 | 36 | (England) | CF | Matty Gillam | 1 | 0 | 0 | 1 | 2 |
| 15 | ~~2~~ | (Republic of Ireland) | RB | Joe Rafferty | 0 | 0 | 0 | 1 | 1 |
| 15 | 7 | (Northern Ireland) | RM | Stephen Dooley | 0 | 0 | 0 | 1 | 1 |
| 15 | 25 | (England) | CM | Daniel Adshead | 0 | 0 | 0 | 1 | 1 |
| 15 | 26 | (England) | CF | Zach Clough | 0 | 0 | 0 | 1 | 1 |
| 15 | ~~27~~ | (England) | RM | Andy Cannon | 0 | 0 | 0 | 1 | 1 |
| Total | | | | | 50 | 2 | 3 | 10 | 65 |

=== Disciplinary record ===
As of 30 June 2019

| Rank | No. | Nat. | Po. | Name | League One | | | FA Cup | | | League Cup | | | League Trophy | | | Total | | |
| Rank | No. | Nat. | Po. | Name | Yellow card | (yellow card) (yellow-red card) | Red card | Yellow card | (yellow card) (yellow-red card) | Red card | Yellow card | (yellow card) (yellow-red card) | Red card | Yellow card | (yellow card) (yellow-red card) | Red card | Yellow card | (yellow card) (yellow-red card) | Red card |
|---|---|---|---|---|---|---|---|---|---|---|---|---|---|---|---|---|---|---|---|
| 1 | 8 | (Wales) | DM | Jordan Williams | 10 | 0 | 0 | 0 | 0 | 0 | 0 | 0 | 0 | 1 | 0 | 0 | 11 | 0 | 0 |
| 2 | 10 | (Northern Ireland) | CM | Callum Camps | 7 | 0 | 0 | 0 | 0 | 0 | 0 | 0 | 0 | 0 | 0 | 0 | 7 | 0 | 0 |
| 2 | 14 | (England) | CM | Oliver Rathbone | 7 | 0 | 0 | 0 | 0 | 0 | 0 | 0 | 0 | 0 | 0 | 0 | 7 | 0 | 0 |
| 2 | 27 | (Scotland) | CM | Ethan Hamilton | 5 | 1 | 0 | 0 | 0 | 0 | 0 | 0 | 0 | 0 | 0 | 0 | 5 | 1 | 0 |
| 5 | 6 | (England) | CB | Ethan Ebanks-Landell | 5 | 0 | 1 | 0 | 0 | 0 | 0 | 0 | 0 | 0 | 0 | 0 | 5 | 0 | 1 |
| 5 | 40 | (England) | CF | Ian Henderson | 6 | 0 | 0 | 0 | 0 | 0 | 0 | 0 | 0 | 0 | 0 | 0 | 6 | 0 | 0 |
| 7 | ~~6~~ | (England) | CB | Harrison McGahey | 4 | 0 | 0 | 1 | 0 | 0 | 0 | 0 | 0 | 0 | 0 | 0 | 5 | 0 | 0 |
| 7 | 16 | (England) | LM | Matt Done | 5 | 0 | 0 | 0 | 0 | 0 | 0 | 0 | 0 | 0 | 0 | 0 | 5 | 0 | 0 |
| 7 | ~~17~~ | (England) | CM | David Perkins | 3 | 0 | 0 | 0 | 0 | 0 | 0 | 0 | 0 | 2 | 0 | 0 | 5 | 0 | 0 |
| 7 | ~~21~~ | (England) | LB | Sam Hart | 5 | 0 | 0 | 0 | 0 | 0 | 0 | 0 | 0 | 0 | 0 | 0 | 5 | 0 | 0 |
| 7 | 39 | (England) | LB | Joe Bunney | 5 | 0 | 0 | 0 | 0 | 0 | 0 | 0 | 0 | 0 | 0 | 0 | 5 | 0 | 0 |
| 11 | 4 | (Scotland) | CB | Jimmy McNulty | 3 | 0 | 0 | 0 | 0 | 0 | 1 | 0 | 0 | 0 | 0 | 0 | 4 | 0 | 0 |
| 11 | 5 | (Republic of Ireland) | CB | Ryan Delaney | 3 | 0 | 0 | 1 | 0 | 0 | 0 | 0 | 0 | 0 | 0 | 0 | 4 | 0 | 0 |
| 11 | 19 | (Australia) | AM | Brad Inman | 3 | 0 | 0 | 1 | 0 | 0 | 0 | 0 | 0 | 0 | 0 | 0 | 4 | 0 | 0 |
| 14 | ~~2~~ | (Republic of Ireland) | RB | Joe Rafferty | 2 | 0 | 0 | 0 | 0 | 0 | 0 | 0 | 0 | 1 | 0 | 0 | 3 | 0 | 0 |
| 14 | 18 | (England) | CF | Aaron Wilbraham | 3 | 0 | 0 | 0 | 0 | 0 | 0 | 0 | 0 | 0 | 0 | 0 | 3 | 0 | 0 |
| 16 | 2 | (Northern Ireland) | RB | Conor McLaughlin | 2 | 0 | 0 | 0 | 0 | 0 | 0 | 0 | 0 | 0 | 0 | 0 | 2 | 0 | 0 |
| 16 | 7 | (Northern Ireland) | RM | Stephen Dooley | 2 | 0 | 0 | 0 | 0 | 0 | 0 | 0 | 0 | 0 | 0 | 0 | 2 | 0 | 0 |
| 16 | 11 | (England) | LW | Jordan Williams | 2 | 0 | 0 | 0 | 0 | 0 | 0 | 0 | 0 | 0 | 0 | 0 | 2 | 0 | 0 |
| 19 | 3 | (South Africa) | LB | Kgosi Nthle | 1 | 0 | 0 | 0 | 0 | 0 | 0 | 0 | 0 | 0 | 0 | 0 | 1 | 0 | 0 |
| 19 | 9 | (England) | CF | Calvin Andrew | 1 | 0 | 0 | 0 | 0 | 0 | 0 | 0 | 0 | 0 | 0 | 0 | 1 | 0 | 0 |
| 19 | ~~12~~ | (England) | RB | Connor Randall | 1 | 0 | 0 | 0 | 0 | 0 | 0 | 0 | 0 | 0 | 0 | 0 | 1 | 0 | 0 |
| 19 | 13 | (Republic of Ireland) | AM | Jimmy Keohane | 1 | 0 | 0 | 0 | 0 | 0 | 0 | 0 | 0 | 0 | 0 | 0 | 1 | 0 | 0 |
| 19 | ~~24~~ | (England) | GK | Mangus Norman | 0 | 0 | 1 | 0 | 0 | 0 | 0 | 0 | 0 | 0 | 0 | 0 | 0 | 0 | 1 |
| 19 | 24 | (England) | GK | Andy Lonergan | 1 | 0 | 0 | 0 | 0 | 0 | 0 | 0 | 0 | 0 | 0 | 0 | 1 | 0 | 0 |
| 19 | 25 | (England) | CM | Daniel Adshead | 0 | 0 | 0 | 0 | 0 | 0 | 0 | 0 | 0 | 1 | 0 | 0 | 1 | 0 | 0 |
| 19 | 26 | (England) | CF | Zach Clough | 1 | 0 | 0 | 0 | 0 | 0 | 0 | 0 | 0 | 0 | 0 | 0 | 1 | 0 | 0 |
| 19 | ~~27~~ | (England) | RM | Andy Cannon | 1 | 0 | 0 | 0 | 0 | 0 | 0 | 0 | 0 | 0 | 0 | 0 | 1 | 0 | 0 |
| Total | | | | | 89 | 1 | 2 | 3 | 0 | 0 | 1 | 0 | 0 | 5 | 0 | 0 | 98 | 1 | 2 |

=== Contracts ===
| Date | Position | Nationality | Name | Status | Contract Length | Expiry date | Ref. |
|---|---|---|---|---|---|---|---|
| 4 July 2018 | CB | (Republic of Ireland) | Ryan Delaney | Signed | 3 Years | June 2021 | |

== Transfers ==
=== Transfers in ===
| Date from | Position | Nationality | Name | From | Fee | Ref. |
|---|---|---|---|---|---|---|
| 1 July 2018 | RM | (Northern Ireland) | Stephen Dooley | (Northern Ireland) Coleraine | Undisclosed | |
| 1 July 2018 | CB | (Republic of Ireland) | James Finnerty | Aston Villa | Free transfer | |
| 1 July 2018 | DM | (England) | David Perkins | Wigan Athletic | Free transfer | |
| 1 July 2018 | CF | (England) | Aaron Wilbraham | Bolton Wanderers | Free transfer | |
| 1 July 2018 | DM | (Wales) | Jordan Williams | Liverpool | Free transfer | |
| 3 July 2018 | CM | (Australia) | Brad Inman | Peterborough United | Free transfer | |
| 23 January 2019 | RB | (Northern Ireland) | Ryan McLaughlin | Blackpool | Undisclosed | |
| 1 February 2019 | AM | (Republic of Ireland) | Jimmy Keohane | (Republic of Ireland) Cork City | Free transfer | |

=== Transfers out ===
| Date from | Position | Nationality | Name | To | Fee | Ref. |
|---|---|---|---|---|---|---|
| 1 July 2018 | CB | (England) | Reece Brown | Free agent | Released | |
| 1 July 2018 | CB | (Republic of Ireland) | Niall Canavan | Plymouth Argyle | Released | |
| 1 July 2018 | CF | (England) | Steve Davies | Blackpool | Released | |
| 1 July 2018 | DM | (Republic of Ireland) | Keith Keane | Free agent | Released | |
| 1 July 2018 | LB | (England) | Mark Kitching | Hartlepool United | Released | |
| 16 July 2018 | CB | (England) | Andy Hollins | Southport | Free transfer | |
| 1 December 2018 | CB | (Republic of Ireland) | James Finnerty | (Republic of Ireland) Bohemian | Mutual consent | |
| 2 January 2019 | RB | (England) | Andy Cannon | Portsmouth | Undisclosed | |
| 2 January 2019 | GK | (United States) | Brendan Moore | (United States) Atlanta United | Mutual Consent | |
| 4 January 2019 | CB | (England) | Harrison McGahey | Scunthorpe United | Undisclosed | |
| 5 January 2019 | DM | (England) | David Perkins | Tranmere Rovers | Undisclosed | |
| 23 January 2019 | RB | (Republic of Ireland) | Joe Rafferty | Preston North End | Undisclosed | |
| 5 February 2019 | RM | (England) | Joe Thompson | Retired | | |

=== Loans in ===
| Start date | Position | Nationality | Name | From | End date | Ref. |
|---|---|---|---|---|---|---|
| 15 August 2018 | GK | (England) | Magnus Norman | Fulham | 31 January 2019 | |
| 23 August 2018 | RB | (England) | Connor Randall | Liverpool | 1 January 2019 | |
| 30 August 2018 | LB | (England) | Sam Hart | Blackburn Rovers | 2 January 2019 | |
| 31 August 2018 | SS | (England) | Zach Clough | Nottingham Forest | 1 January 2019 | |
| 3 January 2019 | CF | (Northern Ireland) | Rory Holden | Bristol City | 31 May 2019 | |
| 11 January 2019 | CB | (England) | Ethan Ebanks-Landell | Wolverhampton Wanderers | 31 May 2019 | |
| 11 January 2019 | CM | (Scotland) | Ethan Hamilton | Manchester United | 31 May 2019 | |
| 30 January 2019 | CF | (England) | Rekeil Pyke | Huddersfield Town | 31 May 2019 | |
| 31 January 2019 | LB | (England) | Joe Bunney | Northampton Town | 31 May 2019 | |
| 31 January 2019 | SS | (England) | Zach Clough | Nottingham Forest | 31 May 2019 | |
| 7 February 2019 | GK | (England) | Andy Lonergan | Middlesbrough | 21 February 2019 | |

=== Loans out ===
| Start date | Position | Nationality | Name | To | End date | Ref. |
|---|---|---|---|---|---|---|
| 12 December 2018 | GK | (England) | Morgan Piper | Wythenshawe Town | Work experience | |
| 25 January 2019 | GK | (England) | Bradley Wade | Barrow | February 2019 | |
| 14 February 2019 | CF | (England) | Matty Gillam | (Republic of Ireland) Cork City | July 2019 | |

== Competitions ==
=== Friendlies ===
On 17 May 2018, Rochdale scheduled a friendly away to Tranmere Rovers for the following July. A match with Stalybridge Celtic was announced a day later, prior to a match versus Stockport County being set on 21 May.

| 6 July 2018 Friendly | Stalybridge Celtic | 0–3 | Rochdale | Stalybridge |
| 19:30 BST | | Report | Andrew 45'; Inman 54'; Rathbone 89' | Stadium: Bower Fold |

| 17 July 2018 Friendly | Stockport County | 0–1 | Rochdale | Stockport |
| 19:45 BST | | Report | Thompson 57' | Stadium: Edgeley Park |

| 21 July 2018 Friendly | Rochdale | 1–0 | Hull City | Rochdale |
| 15:00 BST | Rafferty 90' | Report | | Stadium: Spotland Stadium |

| 24 July 2018 Friendly | Rochdale | 3–2 | Middlesbrough | Rochdale |
| 19:30 BST | Andrew 69'; Inman 85'; Rathbone 90+1' | Report | Fletcher 13'; Chapman 52' | Stadium: Crown Oil Arena |

| 28 July 2018 Friendly | Tranmere Rovers | 1–3 | Rochdale | Birkenhead |
| 15:00 BST | Gilmour 82' | Report | Camps 31'; Inman 42'; Wilbraham 69' (pen.) | Stadium: Prenton Park |

| 31 July 2018 Friendly | FC United of Manchester | 2–4 | Rochdale | Moston |
| 19:45 BST | Barry-Murphy 12' (o.g.); Dickinson 27' | Report | Rathbone 39'; Gillam 45+1'; 56' (o.g.); Williams 63' | Stadium: Broadhurst Park |

=== League One ===
==== League table ====
| Pos | Team | Pld | W | D | L | GF | GA | GD | Pts |
|---|---|---|---|---|---|---|---|---|---|
| 14 | Accrington Stanley | 46 | 14 | 13 | 19 | 51 | 67 | −16 | 55 |
| 15 | Bristol Rovers | 46 | 13 | 15 | 18 | 47 | 50 | −3 | 54 |
| 16 | Rochdale | 46 | 15 | 9 | 22 | 54 | 87 | −33 | 54 |
| 17 | Wycombe Wanderers | 46 | 14 | 11 | 21 | 55 | 67 | −12 | 53 |
| 18 | Shrewsbury Town | 46 | 12 | 16 | 18 | 51 | 59 | −8 | 52 |

Source: EFL Official Website
Rules for classification: 1) Points; 2) Goal difference; 3) Number of goals scored; 4) Head-to-head results

==== Results summary ====
| Overall | | | | | | | | Home | | | | | | Away | | | | | |
| Pld | W | D | L | GF | GA | GD | Pts | W | D | L | GF | GA | GD | W | D | L | GF | GA | GD |
|---|---|---|---|---|---|---|---|---|---|---|---|---|---|---|---|---|---|---|---|
| 46 | 15 | 9 | 22 | 54 | 87 | −33 | 54 | 8 | 4 | 11 | 25 | 37 | −12 | 7 | 5 | 11 | 29 | 50 | −21 |

Last updated: 4 May 2019.

==== Results by matchday ====
| Matchday | 1 | 2 | 3 | 4 | 5 | 6 | 7 | 8 | 9 | 10 | 11 | 12 | 13 | 14 | 15 | 16 | 17 | 18 | 19 | 20 | 21 | 22 | 23 | 24 | 25 | 26 | 27 | 28 | 29 | 30 | 31 | 32 | 33 | 34 | 35 | 36 | 37 | 38 | 39 | 40 | 41 | 42 | 43 | 44 | 45 | 46 |
|---|---|---|---|---|---|---|---|---|---|---|---|---|---|---|---|---|---|---|---|---|---|---|---|---|---|---|---|---|---|---|---|---|---|---|---|---|---|---|---|---|---|---|---|---|---|---|
| Ground | A | H | A | H | H | A | A | H | A | H | H | A | H | A | A | H | H | A | H | A | A | H | A | H | H | A | H | A | H | A | A | H | H | A | A | H | H | H | A | H | A | A | H | A | H | A |
| Result | W | L | D | L | L | W | D | W | L | L | D | D | L | W | L | W | D | L | W | L | D | L | W | W | L | L | L | L | D | L | W | L | L | L | L | W | D | W | D | L | W | L | W | W | W | L |
| Position | 5 | 14 | 15 | 18 | 19 | 14 | 13 | 13 | 14 | 17 | 15 | 15 | 16 | 16 | 17 | 14 | 16 | 18 | 16 | 17 | 18 | 19 | 17 | 16 | 16 | 17 | 18 | 19 | 19 | 20 | 18 | 18 | 20 | 22 | 22 | 22 | 22 | 22 | 23 | 23 | 19 | 20 | 17 | 14 | 14 | 16 |

Updated to match(es) played on 9 April 2019. Source: Statto.com
A = Away; H = Home; W = Win; D = Draw; L = Loss

==== Matches ====
On 21 June 2018, the League One fixtures for the forthcoming season were announced.

| 4 August 2018 1 | Burton Albion | 1–2 | Rochdale | Burton upon Trent |
| 15:00 BST | Buxton (yellow card) 2'; Fox (yellow card) 60'; Boyce 71' | Report | Inman 10', 22'; MJ Williams (yellow card) 88' | Stadium: Pirelli Stadium; Attendance: 2,987; Referee: Darren Drysdale |

| 11 August 2018 2 | Rochdale | 1–4 | Peterborough United | Rochdale |
| 15:00 BST | Henderson 17' (pen.); McGahey (yellow card) 45+3' | Report | Cummings 25'; O'Hara 34', 90+3'; Woodyard (yellow card) 41'; Godden 45+3' | Stadium: Spotland Stadium; Attendance: 3,693; Referee: Anthony Backhouse |

| 18 August 2018 3 | Fleetwood Town | 2–2 | Rochdale | Fleetwood |
| 15:00 BST | Holt (yellow card) 3'; McNulty 29'(o.g.); Evans (yellow card) 45' (goal) 56'; Dempsey (yellow card) 88'; Cairns (yellow card) 90+2'; Jones (yellow card) 90+4' | Report | Henderson 50' (pen.), 90+5' | Stadium: Highbury Stadium; Attendance: 3,565; Referee: Dean Whitestone |

| 21 August 2018 4 | Rochdale | 0–4 | Barnsley | Rochdale |
| 19:45 BST | | Report | Potts 35'; Dougall (yellow card) 41'; Moore 42', 48', 68' | Stadium: Spotland Stadium; Attendance: 4,359; Referee: Michael Salisbury |

| 25 August 2018 5 | Rochdale | 1–2 | Walsall | Rochdale |
| 15:00 BST | Done (yellow card) 29'; Camps 79' | Report | Ginnelly 32'; Ismail 77' (red card) 86' | Stadium: Spotland Stadium; Attendance: 3,080; Referee: Graham Salisbury |

| 1 September 2018 6 | Coventry City | 0–1 | Rochdale | Coventry |
| 15:00 BST | | Report | Andrew 47'; Williams (yellow card) 57' | Stadium: Ricoh Arena; Attendance: 9,879; Referee: Charles Breakspear |

| 8 September 2018 7 | Scunthorpe United | 3–3 | Rochdale | Scunthorpe |
| 15:00 BST | Novak 2'; Colclough 18'; Goode 54'; Lund (yellow card) 73' | Report | Clough (yellow card) 26'; Rathbone 52', 66'; Camps (yellow card) 55'; Hart (yellow card) 68'; Gillam 83' | Stadium: Glanford Park; Attendance: 3,898; Referee: Ross Joyce |

| 15 September 2018 8 | Rochdale | 3–0 | Gillingham | Rochdale |
| 15:00 BST | Henderson 9', 18', 64' (yellow card) 86' | Report | | Stadium: Spotland Stadium; Attendance: 2,925; Referee: Martin Coy |

| 22 September 2018 9 | Sunderland | 4–1 | Rochdale | Sunderland |
| 15:00 BST | Loovens (yellow card) 22'; Maja 37', 45'; Gooch 41', 66' | Report | Rafferty (yellow card) 45+3'; Rathbone (yellow card) 51'; Henderson (yellow card) 52'; Done 71'; Hart (yellow card) 85' | Stadium: Stadium of Light; Attendance: 28,764; Referee: Trevor Kettle |

| 29 September 2018 10 | Rochdale | 1–3 | Portsmouth | Rochdale |
| 15:00 BST | Wilbraham 4' | Report | Lowe 25' (yellow card) 60'; Pitman 71'; Clarke 81' | Stadium: Spotland Stadium; Attendance: 3,796; Referee: John Busby |

| 2 October 2018 11 | Rochdale | 0–0 | Bristol Rovers | Rochdale |
| 19:45 BST | Norman (red card) 45+2'; Inman (yellow card) 71'; Hart (yellow card) 90' | Report | Craig (yellow card) 39'; Clarke (yellow card) 54' | Stadium: Spotland Stadium; Attendance: 2,301; Referee: Matt Donohue |

| 6 October 2018 12 | Blackpool | 2–2 | Rochdale | Blackpool |
| 15:00 BST | Thompson 5'; Tilt 29'; Guy (yellow card) 41'; Spearing (yellow card) 76' | Report | Delaney 9'; Hart (yellow card) 45+3'; MJ Williams (yellow card) 46'; Perkins (yellow card) 57'; Rathbone (yellow card) 69'; Andrew 86'; J Williams (yellow card) 90+3' | Stadium: Bloomfield Road; Attendance: 3,520; Referee: Robert Jones |

| 13 October 2018 13 | Rochdale | 2–3 | Doncaster Rovers | Rochdale |
| 15:00 BST | Henderson 59'; MJ Williams (yellow card) 70'; Cannon (yellow card) 73'; Ntlhe 82' | Report | Mason (yellow card) 17'; Crawford 20'; Wright (yellow card) 27'; Butler 50'; Anderson 68'; Taylor (yellow card) 88' | Stadium: Spotland Stadium; Attendance: 3,600; Referee: Scott Oldham |

| 20 October 2018 14 | Bradford City | 0–2 | Rochdale | Bradford |
| 15:00 BST | Wood (yellow card) 30'; O'Brien (yellow card) 66'; Miller (yellow card) 90'; O'Donnell (yellow card) 90+4' | Report | Henderson 83' (pen.), 90+5' (pen.); Done (yellow card) 90+1' | Stadium: Valley Parade; Attendance: 15,875; Referee: Ben Toner |

| 23 October 2018 15 | Wycombe Wanderers | 3–0 | Rochdale | High Wycombe |
| 19:45 BST | Morris 10'; Akinfenwa 67'; Onyedinma 72' | Report | Ntlhe (yellow card) 28'; Dooley (yellow card) 64' | Stadium: Adams Park; Attendance: 3,997; Referee: Brett Huxtable |

| 28 October 2018 16 | Rochdale | 1–0 | Charlton Athletic | Rochdale |
| 15:00 BST | Henderson 4'; Inman (yellow card) 45+1'; Rathbone (yellow card) 49' | Report | Taylor (penalty missed) 20'; Ward (yellow card) 48'; Cullen (yellow card) 82' | Stadium: Spotland Stadium; Attendance: 3,109; Referee: Andy Haines |

| 3 November 2018 17 | Rochdale | 0–0 | Luton Town | Rochdale |
| 15:00 GMT | | | Shinnie (yellow card) 8'; Hylton (red card) 74' | Stadium: Spotland Stadium; Attendance: 3,689; Referee: Ollie Yates |

| 17 November 2018 18 | Shrewsbury Town | 3–2 | Rochdale | Shrewsbury |
| 15:00 GMT | Norburn 32' (pen.), 72'; Okenabirhie 65' | Report | Camps (yellow card) 30'; Inman 45+1'; J. Williams 58'; Perkins (yellow card) 87' | Stadium: New Meadow; Attendance: 5,861; Referee: Lee Swabey |

| 24 November 2018 19 | Rochdale | 1–0 | Accrington Stanley | Rochdale |
| 15:00 GMT | Delaney (yellow card) 41'; Henderson 69'; McGahey (yellow card) 72' | Report | Finley (yellow card) 90' | Stadium: Spotland Stadium; Attendance: 3,497; Referee: Lee Probert |

| 27 November 2018 20 | Oxford United | 4–2 | Rochdale | Oxford |
| 19:45 GMT | Mackie 11'; Henry 14'; Browne (yellow card) 45+4' (goal) 52', 78' | Report | Henderson 30'; Randall (yellow card) 36'; Wilbraham (yellow card) 39'; McNulty (yellow card) 48'; M.J. Williams (yellow card) 55'; Camps 69'; McGahey (yellow card) 90+2' | Stadium: Kassam Stadium; Attendance: 5,204; Referee: Craig Hicks |

| 8 December 2018 21 | AFC Wimbledon | 1–1 | Rochdale | London |
| 15:00 GMT | Barcham 70'; Purrington (yellow card) 81' | Report | Andrew 35'; M.J. Willams (yellow card) 90+2' | Stadium: Kingsmeadow; Attendance: 3,988; Referee: Kevin Johnson |

| 15 December 2018 22 | Rochdale | 1–2 | Plymouth Argyle | Rochdale |
| 15:00 GMT | Perkins (yellow card) 62'; Inman 76' | Report | Grant 73'; Perkins 80' (o.g.) | Stadium: Spotland Stadium; Attendance: 2,863; Referee: Carl Boyeson |

| 22 December 2018 23 | Southend United | 1–2 | Rochdale | Southend-on-Sea |
| 15:00 GMT | White 81'; Dieng (yellow card) 90+2' | Report | Rathbone (yellow card) 5'; Williams 23'; Camps (yellow card) 51' (goal) 87' | Stadium: Roots Hall; Attendance: 5,735; Referee: Neil Hair |

| 26 December 2018 24 | Rochdale | 2–1 | Blackpool | Rochdale |
| 15:00 GMT | Rathbone 19'; Camps (yellow card) 31'; Henderson 89' | Report | Thompson (red card) 30'; Nottingham 35'; O'Connor (yellow card) 77' | Stadium: Spotland Stadium; Attendance: 4,006; Referee: Thomas Bramall |

| 29 December 2018 25 | Rochdale | 0–4 | Bradford City | Rochdale |
| 15:00 GMT | M.J. Williams (yellow card) 27'; Rathbone (yellow card) 47' | Report | Knight-Percival 23' (yellow card) 44'; Ball (yellow card) 42'; McGowan 48' (yellow card) 70'; Caddis (yellow card) 51'; Doyle 60' (pen.); Miller 89' | Stadium: Spotland Stadium; Attendance: 5,673; Referee: Andy Woolmer |

| 1 January 2019 26 | Doncaster Rovers | 5–0 | Rochdale | Doncaster |
| 15:00 GMT | May 1'; Crawford 23'; Marquis 28', 75'; T Anderson (yellow card) 50'; Coppinger 82' | Report | McGahey (yellow card) 39'; Williams (yellow card) 60'; Camps (yellow card) 66'; Inman (yellow card) 72'; Rathbone (yellow card) 75' | Stadium: Keepmoat Stadium; Attendance: 7,408; Referee: Martin Coy |

| 5 January 2019 27 | Rochdale | 0–4 | Burton Albion | Rochdale |
| 15:00 GMT | M.J. Williams (yellow card) 29'; Camps (yellow card) 35'; Rathbone (yellow card) 62' | Report | Myers-Harness 19', 30', 86'; Hutchinson (yellow card) 50'; Boyce 78' | Stadium: Spotland Stadium; Attendance: 2,666; Referee: Scott Duncan |

| 12 January 2019 28 | Peterborough United | 2–1 | Rochdale | Peterborough |
| 15:00 GMT | Tomlin 23'; Cooper 84' | Report | Done (yellow card) 37'; Hamilton (yellow card) 52' (goal) 90' | Stadium: London Road Stadium; Attendance: 6,025; Referee: Darren Drysdale |

| 19 January 2019 29 | Rochdale | 1–1 | Fleetwood Town | Rochdale |
| 15:00 GMT | Hamilton (yellow card) 42'; Henderson 75'; Camps (yellow card) 80' | Report | Madden 36'; Coyle (red card) 54'; Cairns (yellow card) 82' | Stadium: Spotland Stadium; Attendance: 2,713; Referee: Geoff Eltringham |

| 26 January 2019 30 | Barnsley | 2–1 | Rochdale | Barnsley |
| 15:00 GMT | Moore 54'; Dougall (yellow card) 57'; Woodrow 75'; Davies (yellow card) 83' | Report | Delaney (yellow card) 47'; Henderson 49'; Dooley (yellow card) 68'; Ebanks-Landell (yellow card) 90+5' | Stadium: Oakwell; Attendance: 11,379; Referee: Alan Young |

| 2 February 2019 31 | Walsall | 1–2 | Rochdale | Walsall |
| 15:00 GMT | Edwards 36'; Devlin (yellow card) 43'; Cook (yellow card) 83' | Report | Ebanks-Landell 4'; Hamilton 60' (yellow card) 78'; Henderson (yellow card) 90+6' | Stadium: Bescot Stadium; Attendance: 4,021; Referee: Scott Oldham |

| 9 February 2019 32 | Rochdale | 0–1 | Coventry City | Rochdale |
| 15:00 GMT | Ebanks-Landell (yellow card) 38'; Dooley (yellow card) 73'; Hamilton (yellow card) 76' | Report | Hiwula 68'; Thomas (yellow card) 90+3' | Stadium: Spotland Stadium; Attendance: 3,661; Referee: Paul Marsden |

| 19 February 2019 33 | Rochdale | 3–4 | AFC Wimbledon | Rochdale |
| 19:45 GMT | Pyke 2'; Hamilton 37'; Henderson 81' | Report | Pigott 36', 46', 90+5' (pen.) (yellow card) 90+6'; Wordsworth 76'; McDonald (yellow card) 88' | Stadium: Spotland Stadium; Attendance: 2,410; Referee: Michael Salisbury |

| 23 February 2019 34 | Plymouth Argyle | 5–1 | Rochdale | Plymouth |
| 15:00 GMT | Ladapo 26', 75'; Edwards 61'; Sarcevic (yellow card) 67'; Threlkeld 85'; Smith-Brown 90+4' | Report | Done 48'; Ebanks-Landell (red card) 58'; Camps (yellow card) 72' | Stadium: Home Park; Attendance: 9,360; Referee: Chris Sarginson |

| 2 March 2019 35 | Luton Town | 2–0 | Rochdale | Luton |
| 15:00 GMT | Mpanzu (yellow card) 24'; Hylton 59'; Shinnie (yellow card) 65'; Collins 90+1' | Report | Hamilton (yellow card) 1' (yellow-red card) 85'; Lonergan (yellow card) 45'; Williams (yellow card) 70' | Stadium: Kenilworth Road; Attendance: 9,905; Referee: Lee Swabey |

| 9 March 2019 36 | Rochdale | 2–1 | Shrewsbury Town | Rochdale |
| 15:00 GMT | Ntlhe 15'; Ebanks-Landell (yellow card) 43'; McNulty 47' (yellow card) 87'; Bunney (yellow card) 55' | Report | Waterfall (yellow card) 40'; Williams (yellow card) 51'; Docherty 90+1' | Stadium: Spotland Stadium; Attendance: 3,217; Referee: John Brooks |

| 12 March 2019 37 | Rochdale | 0–0 | Oxford United | Rochdale |
| 19:45 GMT | McNulty (yellow card) 32' | Report | Dickie (yellow card) 46' | Stadium: Spotland Stadium; Attendance: 2,331; Referee: Anthony Backhouse |

| 16 March 2019 P | Accrington Stanley | P–P | Rochdale | Accrington |
| 15:00 GMT | | Report | | Stadium: Crown Ground |
Note: Fixture was postponed due to a waterlogged pitch.

| 23 March 2019 38 | Rochdale | 3–1 | Scunthorpe United | Rochdale |
| 15:00 GMT | Wilbraham 14', 60'; Ntlhe 51' | Report | Hallam 16'; McGahey (yellow card) 27'; McMahon (yellow card) 42' | Stadium: Spotland Stadium; Attendance: 3,361; Referee: Eddie Ilderton |

| 30 March 2019 39 | Gillingham | 1–1 | Rochdale | Gillingham |
| 15:00 GMT | Byrne 45+2'; Hanlan (yellow card) 59'; Fuller (yellow card) 90+6' | Report | Henderson (yellow card) 22' (goal) 37'; Ebanks-Landell (yellow card) 52'; Wilbraham (yellow card) 62'; Andrew (yellow card) 65'; Bunney (yellow card) 80' | Stadium: Priestfield Stadium; Attendance: 4,686; Referee: Alan Young |

| 6 April 2019 40 | Rochdale | 1–2 | Sunderland | Rochdale |
| 15:00 BST | Henderson 28'; Bunney (yellow card) 50'; Williams (yellow card) 85' | Report | Hume (yellow card) 16'; McGeouch (yellow card) 53'; Wyke 56'; Honeyman 89' | Stadium: Spotland Stadium; Attendance: 6,546; Referee: Carl Boyeson |

| 9 April 2019 41 | Accrington Stanley | 0–1 | Rochdale | Accrington |
| 19:45 BST | | Report | McLaughlin (yellow card) 27'; Henderson (yellow card) 39'; Rathbone 71'; Hamilton (yellow card) 78' | Stadium: Crown Ground; Attendance: 2,824; Referee: Christopher Sarginson |

| 13 April 2019 42 | Portsmouth | 4–1 | Rochdale | Portsmouth |
| 15:00 BST | Hawkins 21'; Pitman 45+1' (pen.); Evans 62'; Lowe 79' | Report | Wilbraham (yellow card) 38' (goal) 54'; Ebanks-Landell (yellow card) 45'; Bunney (yellow card) 52' | Stadium: Fratton Park; Attendance: 18,197; Referee: Lee Swabey |

| 19 April 2019 43 | Rochdale | 1–0 | Wycombe Wanderers | Rochdale |
| 15:00 BST | Henderson 79'; Rathbone (yellow card) 83' | Report | | Stadium: Spotland Stadium; Attendance: 3,711; Referee: Andy Haines |

| 22 April 2019 44 | Bristol Rovers | 0–1 | Rochdale | Bristol |
| 15:00 BST | Upson (yellow card) 22'; Clarke (yellow card) 57' | Report | McNulty (yellow card) 14'; Bunney (yellow card) 38'; Williams (yellow card) 78'; Hamilton 82'; Done (yellow card) 85' | Stadium: Memorial Stadium; Attendance: 8,516; Referee: Craig Hicks |

| 27 April 2019 45 | Rochdale | 1–0 | Southend United | Rochdale |
| 15:00 BST | Williams (yellow card) 38'; Henderson 53' | Report | | Stadium: Spotland Stadium; Attendance: 5,000; Referee: Ben Toner |

| 4 May 2019 46 | Charlton Athletic | 4–0 | Rochdale | London |
| 17:30 BST | Aribo 19'; Andrew 32' (o.g.); Taylor 40'; Sarr (yellow card) 50'; Bielik 75' | Report | Keohane (yellow card) 57'; Delaney (yellow card) 90' | Stadium: The Valley; Attendance: 12,705; Referee: Charles Breakspear |

=== FA Cup ===
The first round draw was made live on BBC by Dennis Wise and Dion Dublin on 22 October. The draw for the second round was made live on BBC and BT by Mark Schwarzer and Glenn Murray on 12 November.

| 10 November 2018 First round | Rochdale | 2–1 | Gateshead | Rochdale |
| 15:00 GMT | Mellish 21' (o.g.); Henderson 23'; McGahey (yellow card) 31'; Inman (yellow card) 84' | Report | Mellish 49' | Stadium: Spotland Stadium; Attendance: 2,415; Referee: Peter Wright |

| 2 December 2018 Second round | Rochdale | 0–1 | Portsmouth | Rochdale |
| 14:00 GMT | Delaney (yellow card) 90' | Report | Lowe (yellow card) 45'; Thompson (yellow card) 61'; Green 90' | Stadium: Spotland Stadium; Attendance: 2,555; Referee: Sebastian Stockbridge |

=== EFL Cup ===
On 15 June 2018, the draw for the first round was made in Vietnam. The second round draw was made from the Stadium of Light on 16 August.

| 14 August 2018 First round | Grimsby Town | 0–2 | Rochdale | Cleethorpes |
| 19:45 BST | Welsh (yellow card) 68' | Report | Rathbone 39', 79'; McNulty (yellow card) 67' | Stadium: Blundell Park; Attendance: 1,781; Referee: Darren England |

| 28 August 2018 Second round | Middlesbrough | 2–1 | Rochdale | Middlesbrough |
| 19:45 BST | Johnson 37'; Hugill 53' | Report | Delaney 83' | Stadium: Riverside Stadium; Attendance: 10,344; Referee: Ben Toner |

=== EFL Trophy ===
On 13 July 2018, the initial group stage draw bar the U21 invited clubs was announced. The draw for the second round was made live on Talksport by Leon Britton and Steve Claridge on 16 November. On 8 December, the third round draw was drawn by Alan McInally and Matt Le Tissier on Soccer Saturday.

| Pos | Lge | Team | Pld | W | PW | PL | L | GF | GA | GD | Pts | Qualification |
|---|---|---|---|---|---|---|---|---|---|---|---|---|
| 1 | L1 | Rochdale | 3 | 2 | 0 | 1 | 0 | 6 | 3 | +3 | 7 | Round 2 |
| 2 | L2 | Bury | 3 | 2 | 0 | 0 | 1 | 6 | 4 | +2 | 6 | Round 2 |
| 3 | ACA | Leicester City U21 | 3 | 0 | 2 | 0 | 1 | 5 | 6 | −1 | 4 | |
| 4 | L1 | Fleetwood Town | 3 | 0 | 0 | 1 | 2 | 3 | 7 | −4 | 1 | |

Source: EFL.com

| 4 September 2018 Group Game 1 | Rochdale | 2–1 | Bury | Rochdale |
| 19:45 BST | Clough 16'; Gillam 19' | Report | Lavery 70' (pen.); Moore (yellow card) 89' | Stadium: Spotland Stadium; Attendance: 1582; Referee: Carl Boyeson |

| 9 October 2018 Group Game 2 | Fleetwood Town | 0–2 | Rochdale | Fleetwood |
| 19:45 BST | Dempsey (yellow card) 42'; Biggins (yellow card) 61'; Holt (yellow card) 78' | Report | J Williams 16'; Cannon 47' | Stadium: Highbury Stadium; Attendance: 669; Referee: Ross Joyce |

| 7 November 2018 Group Game 3 | Rochdale | 2–2 (3–4 p) | Leicester City U21 | Rochdale |
| 19:45 GMT | Andrew 5'; McNulty 17' | Report | Pașcanu 28'; Loft 66' | Stadium: Spotland Stadium; Attendance: 615; Referee: Thomas Bramall |
| | Penalties |
| | Clough (penalty missed); Perkins (penalty scored); Wilbraham (penalty scored); Hoti (penalty missed); Hooper (penalty scored); MJ Williams (penalty missed) | | Johnson (penalty missed); Dewsbury-Hall (penalty scored); Pașcanu (penalty scored); Thomas (penalty scored); Loft (penalty missed); Sherif (penalty scored) |

| 5 December 2018 Second round | Rochdale | P–P | Oldham Athletic | Rochdale |
| 19:00 GMT | | Report | | Stadium: Spotland Stadium |
Note: Fixture was postponed due to waterlogged pitch.

| 11 December 2018 Second round | Rochdale | 2–0 | Oldham Athletic | Rochdale |
| 19:00 GMT | Rafferty (yellow card) 52' (goal) 90+2' (pen.); Perkins (yellow card) 75'; Adshead 90+4' | Report | Maouche (red card) 51'; Clarke (yellow card) 52'; Hunt (yellow card) 63' | Stadium: Spotland Stadium; Attendance: 1,854; Referee: Oliver Langford |

| 8 January 2019 Third round | Rochdale | 2–4 | Manchester City U21 | Rochdale |
| 19:00 GMT | McNulty 4'; Dooley 29' | Report | Richards (penalty missed) 25' 84'; Sandler (yellow card) 27'; Bolton 50'; Braaf 67', 82' | Stadium: Spotland Stadium; Attendance: 2,176; Referee: Ross Joyce |
