= Harrison McGahey =

English footballer

Personal information
- Full name: Harrison McGahey
- Date of birth: 26 September 1995 (age 31)
- Place of birth: Preston, England
- Height: 1.87 m (6 ft 2 in)
- Position: Defender

Team information
- Current team: Flint Town United
- Number: 4

Youth career
- Blackburn Rovers
- Liverpool
- 2012–2014: Blackpool

Senior career*
Years	Team	Apps	(Gls)
2014	Blackpool	4	(0)
2014–2016	Sheffield United	22	(0)
2015	→ Tranmere Rovers (loan)	4	(0)
2016–2019	Rochdale	99	(0)
2019–2021	Scunthorpe United	58	(1)
2021–2024	Oldham Athletic	56	(0)
2024–2026	The New Saints	45	(1)
2026–	Flint Town United	11	(0)
- * Club domestic league appearances and goals as of 06:37, 7 November 2026 (UTC)

Harrison McGahey (born 26 September 1995) is an English professional footballer who plays as a defender for Cymru Premier club Flint Town United. McGahey began his career as a junior with Blackburn Rovers and then Liverpool, before moving to Blackpool where he eventually made his first team debut.

== Career ==
=== Blackpool ===
McGahey joined Blackpool aged 14 after spells in the youth teams of Blackburn Rovers and Liverpool. After helping the Blackpool youth side win the junior league title, McGahey signed a professional contract with the club. He then made his professional league début for Blackpool on 18 April 2014 in a 1–0 home defeat against Burnley. McGahey's deal was only a short-term one and after three first-team appearances he elected not to renew terms with the club.

=== Sheffield United ===
McGahey signed a two-year contract, with an option for a third, for Sheffield United for an undisclosed fee on 18 July 2014. Despite McGahey being out of contract, his age meant that Blackpool were due a fee and as such the two clubs agreed a compensation package.

McGahey joined Tranmere Rovers on loan until the end of the 2014–15 season on 13 February 2015. He was recalled one month later.

=== Rochdale ===
On 16 June 2016 McGahey joined Rochdale on a two-year deal.

He was offered a new contract by Rochdale at the end of the 2017–18 season.

=== Scunthorpe United ===
On 4 January 2019, McGahey signed for Scunthorpe United for an undisclosed fee on a two-and-a-half-year deal. He was one of 17 players released by Scunthorpe at the end of the 2020–21 season.

=== Oldham Athletic ===
On 22 June 2021, McGahey signed for Oldham Athletic.

=== The New Saints ===
On 17 June 2024, McGahey joined Cymru Premier side The New Saints.

=== Flint Town United ===
in June 2026 he joined Flint Town United.

== Career statistics ==
=== Club ===
As of end of 2023–24 season

Appearances and goals by club, season and competition
Club	Season	League			FA Cup		League Cup		Other		Total	
Club	Season	Division	Apps	Goals	Apps	Goals	Apps	Goals	Apps	Goals	Apps	Goals
Blackpool	2013–14	Championship	4	0	0	0	0	0	0	0	4	0
Sheffield United	2014–15	League One	15	0	1	0	4	0	2 (Note: Appearance(s) in the Football League Trophy)	0	22	0
Sheffield United	2015–16	League One	7	0	1	0	1	0	3	0	12	0
Sheffield United	Sheffield United		22	0	2	0	5	0	5	0	34	0
Tranmere Rovers (loan)	2014–15	League Two	4	0	0	0	0	0	0	0	4	0
Rochdale	2016–17	League One	36	0	5	0	2	0	4	0	47	0
Rochdale	2017–18	League One	42	0	6	0	1	0	4	0	53	0
Rochdale	2018–19	League One	21	0	2	0	2	0	2	0	27	0
Rochdale	Rochdale A.F.C.		99	0	13	0	5	0	10	0	127	0
Scunthorpe United	2018–19	League One	10	0	0	0	0	0	0	0	10	0
Scunthorpe United	2019–20	League Two	32	0	0	0	0	0	4	0	36	0
Scunthorpe United	2020–21	League Two	15	1	0	0	0	0	1	0	16	1
Scunthorpe United	Scunthorpe United		57	1	0	0	0	0	5	0	62	1
Oldham Athletic	2021–22	League Two	25	0	2	1	0	0	3	0	30	1
Oldham Athletic	2022–23	National League	6	0	0	0	—		0	0	6	0
Oldham Athletic	2023–24	National League	25	0	2	1	—		2 (Note: Appearance(s) in FA Trophy)	0	29	1
Oldham Athletic	Total		56	0	4	2	0	0	5	0	65	2
Career total			242	1	19	2	10	0	25	0	296	3
