= Joe Bunney =

English footballer (born 1993)

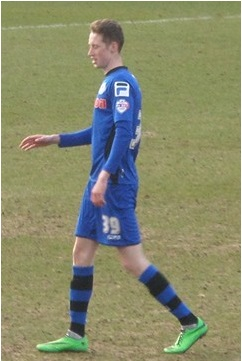
- Bunney playing for Rochdale in 2015

Personal information
- Full name: Joseph Elliott Bunney
- Date of birth: 26 September 1993 (age 33)
- Place of birth: Manchester, England
- Height: 6 ft 5 in (1.96 m)
- Positions: Left-back; forward

Youth career
- ?–2011: Lancaster City

Senior career*
Years	Team	Apps	(Gls)
2011–2012	Lancaster City		
2012	Kendal Town		
2012	Stockport County	1	(0)
2012–2013	Northwich Victoria		
2013–2018	Rochdale	122	(16)
2018–2019	Northampton Town	16	(0)
2018–2019	→ Blackpool (loan)	5	(0)
2019	→ Rochdale (loan)	16	(0)
2019–2020	Bolton Wanderers	2	(0)
2020	Matlock Town	2	(0)
2020–2021	Hartlepool United	4	(0)
2021	Grimsby Town	5	(0)
2021	Altrincham	4	(0)
2021–2022	Warrington Rylands	7	(5)
2022–2023	Macclesfield	17	(2)
2022–2023	→ Ashton United (loan)	3	(0)
2023	→ Marine (loan)	13	(0)
2023–2025	Stalybridge Celtic	0	(0)
2023	→ Workington (loan)	9	(2)
2024	→ Hyde United (loan)	9	(0)
2025	Nantwich Town	8	(1)
- * Club domestic league appearances and goals as of 20:51, 7 May 2024 (UTC)

Joseph Elliott Bunney (born 26 September 1993) is an English professional footballer who plays as a left-back or forward.

He has previously played professionally in the Football League for Rochdale, Northampton Town, Bolton Wanderers, Hartlepool United and Grimsby Town as well as at Non-league level for Lancaster City, Kendal Town, Stockport County, Northwich Victoria, Matlock Town, Altrincham, Warrington Rylands, Macclesfield, Ashton United and Marine.

== Club career ==
=== Early career ===
Born in Gorton, Manchester, Bunney worked his way through Lancaster City's youth system and broke into their first team during the 2011–12 season as the club competed in the Northern Premier League Division One North, whilst studying sports science at Myerscough College in Preston, Lancashire.

=== Rochdale ===
Bunney made his debut as a professional at Rochdale on 27 April 2013 as a substitute in a 1–0 victory against Plymouth, on the final day of the 2012–13 season with Bunney scoring the winning goal with a header after a cross from another débutante, Scott Tanser. On 1 July 2014, Bunney signed a new two-year contract at Rochdale.

=== Northampton Town ===
On 16 January 2018, Bunney signed for Northampton Town for an undisclosed fee.

On 25 June 2018, Bunney signed for Blackpool on loan.

On 31 January 2019, Bunney's loan at Blackpool was cut short and then loaned out to his former club Rochdale until the end of the season.

He was one of 3 transfer-listed by Northampton at the end of the 2018–19 season; a further 8 were released.

=== Bolton Wanderers ===
On 2 September 2019, Bunney signed for Bolton Wanderers on a free transfer from Northampton Town on a contract until the end of the season. The following weekend he was involved in a road traffic collision on the M55 motorway that left him with broken ribs and a broken collarbone. On 26 June it was announced Bunney would be one of 14 senior players released at the end of his contract on 30 June.

=== Matlock and Hartlepool ===
On 19 October 2020, Bunney signed for Matlock Town. He played two matches for the club, registering an assist in both games. A month later he signed for Hartlepool United on 30 November. He left on 26 January 2021 as he wanted to return to playing in the English Football League.

=== Grimsby Town ===
On 1 February 2021, Bunney joined League Two side Grimsby Town on a contract until the end of the 2020–21 season. Bunney had already played for Matlock and Hartlepool in the 2020–2021 season, usually meaning he wouldn't be able to sign for a third team as players can only play for two teams in one season – however FIFA changed the rules for that season to allow players to play for three teams, to alleviate the effects of the coronavirus pandemic on football.

On 18 March 2021, it was announced by manager Paul Hurst that Bunney had played his final game for the club after he was taken to hospital hours after a game against Carlisle United, and would effectively be leaving the club because of an unreported medical condition.

=== Return to Non-League ===
On 25 August 2021, Bunney signed a contract for National League side Altrincham.

On 8 October 2021, it was announced Bunney had signed for Warrington Rylands.

On 2 June 2022, Bunney joined Scunthorpe United on trial and played in a 3–2 pre-season defeat against Middlesbrough.

Bunney signed with Macclesfield ahead of the 2022–23 season. In December 2022, Bunney joined Ashton United on a three month loan. In February 2023, he signed for Marine on loan until 1 April. His loan spell was later extended until the end of the season, and he scored the winning penalty in the Liverpool Senior Cup final against Runcorn Linnets.

On 2 July 2023, Bunney signed for Stalybridge Celtic. In November 2023, he joined Workington on a one-month loan deal.

Bunney played for Nantwich Town in 2025.

== Career statistics ==
=== Club ===
As of match played 13 April 2024

Appearances and goals by club, season and competition
Club	Season	League			FA Cup		League Cup		Other		Total	
Club	Season	Division	Apps	Goals	Apps	Goals	Apps	Goals	Apps	Goals	Apps	Goals
Stockport County	2012–13	Conference Premier	1	0	0	0	—		0	0	1	0
Rochdale	2012–13	League Two	1	1	0	0	0	0	0	0	1	1
Rochdale	2013–14	League Two	21	3	2	0	0	0	1 (Note: Appearance(s) in the EFL Trophy.)	0	24	3
Rochdale	2014–15	League One	19	2	2	0	1	0	0	0	22	2
Rochdale	2015–16	League One	32	9	1	0	1	0	0	0	34	9
Rochdale	2016–17	League One	29	1	3	0	1	0	3	0	36	1
Rochdale	2017–18	League One	20	0	2	0	0	0	5	1	27	1
Rochdale	Total		122	16	10	0	3	0	9	0	144	17
Northampton Town	2017–18	League One	12	0	0	0	0	0	0	0	12	0
Northampton Town	2018–19	League One	0	0	0	0	0	0	0	0	0	0
Northampton Town	2019–20	League Two	4	0	0	0	1	0	1	0	6	0
Northampton Town	Total		16	0	0	0	1	0	1	0	18	0
Blackpool (loan)	2018–19	League One	5	0	0	0	0	0	1	0	6	0
Rochdale (loan)	2018–19	League One	16	0	0	0	0	0	0	0	16	0
Bolton Wanderers	2019–20	League One	2	0	0	0	0	0	0	0	2	0
Matlock Town	2020–21	NPL Premier Division	2	0	0	0	—		0	0	2	0
Hartlepool United	2020–21	National League	4	0	0	0	—		1 (Note: Appearance(s) in the FA Trophy.)	0	5	0
Grimsby Town	2020–21	League Two	5	0	0	0	0	0	0	0	5	0
Altrincham	2021–22	National League	4	0	0	0	—		0	0	4	0
Warrington Rylands	2021–22	NPL West Division	7	5	0	0	—		1	0	8	5
Macclesfield	2022–23	NPL West Division	17	2	2	0	—		6 (Note: Appearance(s) in the FA Trophy and Cheshire Senior Cup.)	1	25	3
Ashton United (loan)	2022–23	NPL Premier Division	3	0	—		—		—		3	0
Marine (loan)	2022–23	NPL Premier Division	13	0	—		—		3 (Note: Appearance(s) in the Liverpool Senior Cup.)	0	16	0
Workington (loan)	2023–24	NPL Premier Division	9	2	—		—		0	0	9	2
Hyde United (loan)	2023–24	NPL Premier Division	9	0	—		—		2	0	11	0
Career total			237	25	12	0	4	0	24	2	275	27

== Personal life ==
Bunney is married to England and Manchester United footballer Ella Toone.

== Legal issues ==
In 2024, Bunney claimed that actor Ryan Prescott and partner, actress Amy Lythgoe, were squatting in a property belonging to him, after their tenancy agreement had come to an end. This left Bunney's grandfather, who was planning to move into the property, homeless. Prescott 'strongly denied' these claims, and along with Lythgoe, filed a £60,000 libel and defamation case against Bunney at the High Court.

== Honours ==
Marine

- Liverpool Senior Cup: 2022–23

Macclesfield

- Northern Premier League Division One West: 2022–23
