= Andy Cannon =

English association football player (born 1996)

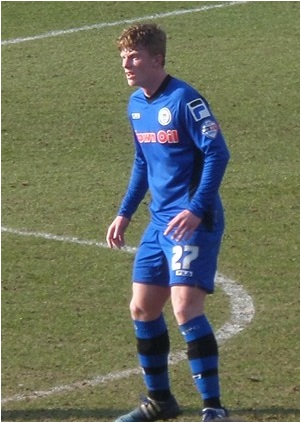
- Cannon playing for Rochdale in 2015

Personal information
- Full name: Andrew Francis Cannon
- Date of birth: 14 March 1996 (age 30)
- Place of birth: Ashton-under-Lyne, England
- Height: 1.76 m (5 ft 9 in)
- Position: Attacking midfielder

Team information
- Current team: Fleetwood Town
- Number: 7

Youth career
- –2014: Rochdale

Senior career*
Years	Team	Apps	(Gls)
2014–2019	Rochdale	100	(4)
2019–2021	Portsmouth	63	(3)
2021–2022	Hull City	15	(1)
2022	→ Stockport County (loan)	9	(1)
2022–2026	Wrexham	75	(8)
2026	→ Burton Albion (loan)	16	(0)
2026–	Fleetwood Town	0	(0)
- * Club domestic league appearances and goals as of 21:45, 14 July 2026 (UTC)

Andrew Francis Cannon (born 14 March 1996) is an English professional footballer who plays as an attacking midfielder for EFL League Two club Fleetwood Town.

== Early life and education ==
Cannon grew up in Simmondley, a small village in Derbyshire. He attended St Philip Howard Catholic Voluntary Academy, a Faith school located in Glossop.

== Career ==
=== Rochdale ===
Cannon made his first team debut for Rochdale on 27 September 2014, coming on as a second-half substitute for Bastien Hery in an away League One match against Leyton Orient at Brisbane Road.

On 20 May 2015, Cannon signed a contract extension at Rochdale to keep him at the club until the summer of 2017.

Cannon scored his first goal for Rochdale in a 3–2 loss to Peterborough United on 6 August 2016, and then scored his second goal for the club on 9 August 2016 in a 3–1 EFL Cup win over Chesterfield.

He was man of the match in Rochdale's 2–2 draw in the 5th round of the FA Cup against Tottenham Hotspur.

He was offered a new contract by Rochdale at the end of the 2017–18 season.

=== Portsmouth ===
Cannon signed for Portsmouth on 2 January 2019 for an undisclosed fee reported to be around £150,000. Kenny Jackett has suggested that he sees Cannon as an attacking midfielder. Cannon was cup-tied for Portsmouth's win in the 2019 EFL Trophy Final.

=== Hull City ===
On 16 June 2021, Cannon signed a two-year deal with Hull City, the club holding an option for a further year. He made his debut for Hull City on 7 August 2021, after coming on as a substitute in the 4–1 away win at Preston North End, scoring his first goal for Hull in added time.

=== Stockport County (loan) ===
On 24 March 2022, Cannon moved to Stockport County on loan for the remainder of the season.

Cannon made his debut for the Hatters on 26 March as a late substitute in the club's 2–0 league victory against Eastleigh and then 3 days later on 29 March made his first start for the club and scored his first goal in Stockport's 5–0 Cheshire Senior Cup victory against Crewe Alexandra. Cannon went on to help Stockport secure promotion back to the Football League by winning the National League trophy following a 2–0 win over FC Halifax Town on 15 May 2022.

=== Wrexham ===
On 9 December 2022, Cannon signed a permanent deal with Wrexham for an undisclosed fee. He made 16 appearances after the transfer to help Wrexham secure promotion to League Two. In the 2023–24 season, Cannon played in 35 league matches, starting in 31, as Wrexham secured their second consecutive promotion.

On 9 August 2024, Cannon signed a new contract at Wrexham, extending his commitment until 2026 with an option for 2027. On 15 May 2026 the club announced it was releasing the player.

=== Fleetwood Town ===
On 14 July 2026, Cannon signed a 3-year deal with EFL League Two side Fleetwood Town.

== Personal life ==
On 21 March 2020, it was reported that Cannon had tested positive for COVID-19 during the 2020 pandemic.

== Career statistics ==
As of 15 July 2026

Appearances and goals by club, season and competition
Club	Season	League			FA Cup		League Cup		Other		Total	
Club	Season	Division	Apps	Goals	Apps	Goals	Apps	Goals	Apps	Goals	Apps	Goals
Rochdale	2014–15	League One	18	0	0	0	0	0	1 (Note: Appearances in the EFL Trophy)	0	19	0
Rochdale	2015–16	League One	25	0	2	0	1	0	2	0	30	0
Rochdale	2016–17	League One	24	2	3	0	2	1	2	0	31	3
Rochdale	2017–18	League One	21	2	6	0	1	0	3	0	31	2
Rochdale	2018–19	League One	12	0	1	0	2	0	1	1	16	1
Rochdale	Total		100	4	12	0	6	1	9	1	127	6
Portsmouth	2018–19	League One	2	0	—		—		—		2	0
Portsmouth	2019–20	League One	18	1	3	0	2	0	5	0	28	1
Portsmouth	2020–21	League One	43	2	2	0	2	0	2	0	49	2
Portsmouth	Total		63	3	5	0	4	0	7	0	79	3
Hull City	2021–22	Championship	10	1	0	0	1	0	—		11	1
Hull City	2022–23	Championship	5	0	0	0	1	0	—		6	0
Hull City	Total		15	1	0	0	2	0	—		17	1
Stockport County (loan)	2021–22	National League	9	1	—		—		1 (Note: Appearance(s) in FA Trophy)	0	10	1
Wrexham	2022–23	National League	16	0	1	0	—		2	0	19	0
Wrexham	2023–24	League Two	35	6	4	2	1	0	1	0	41	8
Wrexham	2024–25	League One	24	2	1	0	0	0	3	0	28	2
Wrexham	2025–26	Championship	0	0	0	0	0	0	—		0	0
Wrexham	Total		75	8	6	2	1	0	6	0	88	10
Burton Albion (loan)	2025–26	League One	16	0	1	0	0	0	—		17	0
Fleetwood Town	2026–27	League Two	0	0	0	0	0	0	—		0	0
Career total			278	17	24	2	13	1	19	1	334	21

== Honours ==
Wrexham

- National League: 2022–23
- EFL League Two runner-up: 2023–24
- EFL League One runner up: 2024–25
