= Matty Gillam =

English footballer

Matty (The Beast) Gillam
Personal information
- Birth name: Matthew Rhys Gillam
- Date of birth: 4 October 1998 (age 28)
- Place of birth: Bexley, England
- Height: 1.82 m (6 ft 0 in)
- Position: Forward

Team information
- Current team: Congleton Town

Youth career
- –2016: Rochdale

Senior career*
Years	Team	Apps	(Gls)
2016–2020	Rochdale	20	(2)
2016	→ Stalybridge Celtic (loan)	2	(0)
2019	→ Cork City (loan)	3	(0)
2020–2021	Guiseley	6	(0)
2021–2022	Atherton Collieries	33	(7)
2022–2024	Glossop North End	42	(5)
2024–	Congleton Town F.C.		
- * Club domestic league appearances and goals as of 22:19, 31 March 2022 (UTC)

Matthew Rhys Gillam (born 4 October 1998) is an English footballer who plays for Northern Premier League side Congleton Town F.C..

== Career ==
=== Early life ===
Gillam was born in Bexley, Kent but moved with his family to Congleton, Cheshire, when he was only a few months old. He first started playing for a local junior side, where he was quickly scouted by Port Vale and signed up for their Academy system. At the age of 12 he was spotted by Manchester City scouts and spent three months there before joining the Stoke City Academy. He was not offered a scholarship by Stoke, so he subsequently moved to Rochdale where they did offer him one.

=== Rochdale ===
He signed his first professional contract with Rochdale during the summer of 2016, after the youngster came through the youth ranks at the Crown Oil Arena. His first appearance for the club came on 9 November 2016 in the EFL Trophy, with a 2-1 win over Hartlepool. He marked the occasion with a debut goal.

At the end of the 2017-2018 season, Gillam's contract was due to expire in the summer. On 25 May 2018, the 19 year old signed a new two-year deal with Rochdale. In February 2019, following a week long trial, Gillam signed a short term loan contract with Cork City until July.

=== Non-league ===
On 14 August 2020, following on from his release from Rochdale, he signed for National League North side Guiseley following a recommendation from his former Rochdale teammate, Brad Wade. The season was curtailed due to COVID-19 and Gillam only went on to make nine appearances for the club.

On 28 August 2021, he dropped down a division to sign for Northern Premier League Premier Division side Atherton Collieries, where he would contribute seven goals and four assists over 33 competitive appearances, before signing for Glossop North End on 6 June 2022.

== Career statistics ==
As of match played 12 March 2022

Appearances and goals by club, season and competition
Club	Season	League			FA Cup		EFL Cup		Other		Total	
Club	Season	Division	Apps	Goals	Apps	Goals	Apps	Goals	Apps	Goals	Apps	Goals
Rochdale	2016–17	League One	0	0	0	0	0	0	1 (Note: Appearance(s) in the EFL Trophy)	1	1	1
Rochdale	2017–18	League One	8	1	1	0	1	0	2	1	12	2
Rochdale	2018–19	League One	10	1	0	0	1	0	3	1	14	2
Rochdale	2019–20	League One	2	0	0	0	0	0	3	0	5	0
Rochdale	Total		20	2	1	0	2	0	9	3	32	5
Stalybridge Celtic (loan)	2016–17	National League North	2	0	—		—		—		2	0
Cork City	2019	LOI Premier Division	3	0	—		—		—		3	0
Guiseley	2020–21	National League North	6	0	3	0	—		0	0	9	0
Atherton Collieries	2021–22	NPL Premier Division	24	6	4	0	—		5 (Note: One appearance in the FA Trophy, four appearances and one goal in the Lancashire FA Challenge Trophy)	1	33	7
Career total			55	8	8	0	2	0	14	4	79	12
