= Josh Lillis =

English footballer

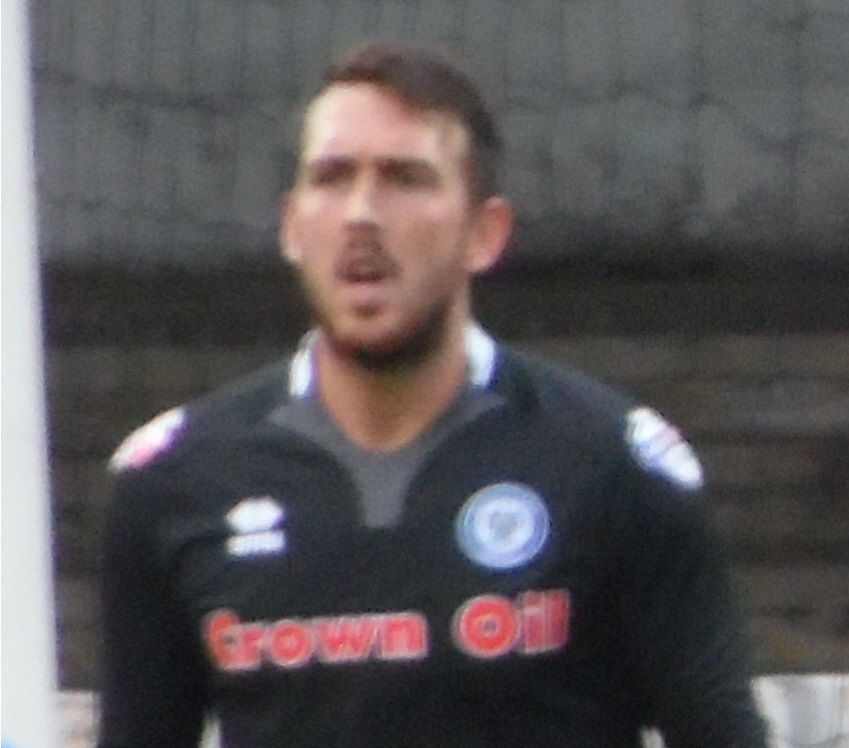
- Lillis playing for Rochdale in 2015

Personal information
- Full name: Joshua Mark Lillis
- Date of birth: 24 June 1987 (age 39)
- Place of birth: Derby, England
- Height: 6 ft 2 in (1.89 m)
- Position: Goalkeeper

Team information
- Current team: Rochdale (goalkeeping coach)

Youth career
- 2000–2004: Scunthorpe United

Senior career*
Years	Team	Apps	(Gls)
2004–2012	Scunthorpe United	39	(0)
2009	→ Notts County (loan)	5	(0)
2009	→ Grimsby Town (loan)	4	(0)
2009	→ Rochdale (loan)	1	(0)
2010–2011	→ Rochdale (loan)	23	(0)
2012–2020	Rochdale	228	(0)
2020	→ AFC Fylde (loan)	3	(0)
2020–2024	Barrow	5	(0)
- * Club domestic league appearances and goals

Joshua Mark Lillis (born 24 June 1987) is an English professional footballer who plays as a goalkeeper. He is goalkeeping coach at Rochdale.

He began his career at Scunthorpe United in the League One and Championship. He spent time on loan at Notts County, and Grimsby Town, before making a permanent move to former loan club Rochdale in 2012. In March 2020, he joined National League side AFC Fylde on loan, before moving permanently to League Two Barrow at the end of that season.

== Club career ==
=== Scunthorpe United ===
Born in Derby, Derbyshire, Lillis worked his way through Scunthorpe United's youth system, and made his début as a professional at Millwall on 22 December 2006. He spent most of his time at the Iron as the understudy of Joe Murphy, but has improved under the coaching of former Sheffield Wednesday stalwart Kevin Pressman.

In January 2009, Lillis went to Notts County on a one-month loan in order to experience more first team action. He made his début in 2–2 draw with Aldershot Town on 20 January 2009. His first clean sheet for the Magpies came on 14 February where Notts County beat Barnet 2–0. He returned to Scunthorpe making 5 appearances and 1 clean sheet.

On 1 September 2009, he signed for Grimsby Town on loan as cover for injured Nick Colgan. He made his début on 5 September 2009 against Port Vale, in a 4–0 defeat. He made four appearances before returning to the Iron. On 30 October he joined Rochdale on an emergency seven-day loan. His début was in a 4–0 win over AFC Bournemouth on 31 October 2009.

In July 2010, he was loaned to Rochdale again for six months.

Lillis returned to Scunthorpe at the end of his loan spell, but found his chances limited at Glanford Park and was released in May 2012.

=== Rochdale ===
On 12 June 2012, Rochdale announced that he had signed a two-year deal to return to Spotland where he had previously had a successful loan spell. After impressive displays in Rochdale's 2013/14 promotion campaign, Lillis has since committed himself to Rochdale for a further two years.

On 26 May 2016, Lillis signed a new two-year deal with Rochdale.

Lillis joined AFC Fylde on loan until the end of the season on 6 March 2020.

=== Barrow ===
Following his release from Rochdale at the end of the 2019/20 season, Lillis joined newly-promoted Barrow as a player-coach in September 2020.

He was one of three Barrow players to be offered a new contract at the end of the 2022–23 season.

Following the conclusion of the 2023–24 season, the club announced that they had offered Lillis a new contract which would see him become full-time goalkeeping coach. In June 2024, it was confirmed that he had been unable to agree a new contract with the club.

== Coaching career ==
On 11 October 2024, Lillis returned to former club Rochdale as goalkeeping coach.

== Personal life ==
He is the son of former Scunthorpe United player and assistant manager Mark Lillis.

== Career statistics ==
As of end of 2023–24 season

Club	Season	League			FA Cup		League Cup		Other		Total	
Club	Season	Division	Apps	Goals	Apps	Goals	Apps	Goals	Apps	Goals	Apps	Goals
Scunthorpe United	2006–07	League One	1	0	0	0	0	0	1 (Note: Appearance(s) in Football League Trophy)	0	2	0
Scunthorpe United	2007–08	Championship	3	0	1	0	1	0	—		5	0
Scunthorpe United	2008–09	League One	5	0	0	0	1	0	3 (Note: Two appearances in Football League Trophy, one appearance in League One play-offs)	0	9	0
Scunthorpe United	2009–10	Championship	8	0	1	0	1	0	—		10	0
Scunthorpe United	2010–11	Championship	15	0	0	0	0	0	—		15	0
Scunthorpe United	2011–12	League One	6	0	0	0	2	0	1	0	9	0
Scunthorpe United	Total		38	0	2	0	5	0	5	0	50	0
Notts County (loan)	2008–09	League Two	5	0	0	0	0	0	0	0	5	0
Grimsby Town (loan)	2009–10	League Two	4	0	0	0	0	0	0	0	4	0
Rochdale (loan)	2009–10	League Two	1	0	0	0	0	0	0	0	1	0
Rochdale (loan)	2010–11	League One	23	0	1	0	2	0	1	0	27	0
Rochdale	2012–13	League Two	46	0	2	0	1	0	0	0	49	0
Rochdale	2013–14	League Two	45	0	4	0	1	0	2	0	52	0
Rochdale	2014–15	League One	16	0	2	0	1	0	0	0	19	0
Rochdale	2015–16	League One	40	0	1	0	2	0	1	0	44	0
Rochdale	2016–17	League One	14	0	1	0	1	0	3 (Note: Appearances in EFL Trophy)	0	19	0
Rochdale	2017–18	League One	40	0	7	0	1	0	4	0	52	0
Rochdale	2018–19	League One	27	0	1	0	1	0	0	0	29	0
Rochdale	2019–20	League One	0	0	0	0	0	0	0	0	0	0
Rochdale	Total		228	0	18	0	8	0	10	0	264	0
AFC Fylde (loan)	2019–20	National League	3	0	0	0	0	0	0	0	3	0
Barrow	2020–21	League Two	0	0	1	0	0	0	2	0	3	0
Barrow	2021–22	League Two	0	0	0	0	0	0	2	0	2	0
Barrow	2022–23	League Two	3	0	0	0	0	0	2	0	5	0
Barrow	2023–24	League Two	2	0	0	0	0	0	3	0	5	0
Barrow	Total		5	0	1	0	0	0	9	0	15	0
Career total			328	0	22	0	15	0	24	0	389	0

== Honours ==
Scunthorpe United

- Football League One play-offs: 2009
- Football League Trophy runner-up: 2008–09

Individual

- Rochdale Player of the Year: 2015–16
