= Ian Henderson (footballer) =

English footballer

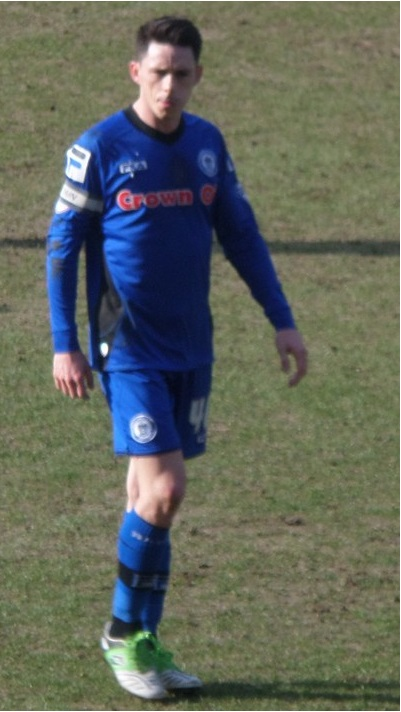
- Henderson playing for Rochdale in 2015

Personal information
- Full name: Ian Henderson
- Date of birth: 24 January 1985 (age 41)
- Place of birth: Bury St Edmunds, England
- Height: 5 ft 8 in (1.73 m)
- Positions: Forward; midfielder

Team information
- Current team: Rochdale
- Number: 40

Youth career
- –2002: Norwich City

Senior career*
Years	Team	Apps	(Gls)
2002–2007	Norwich City	68	(6)
2007	→ Rotherham United (loan)	18	(1)
2007–2008	Northampton Town	26	(0)
2008–2009	Luton Town	18	(1)
2009–2010	Ankaragücü	3	(0)
2010–2013	Colchester United	118	(24)
2013–2020	Rochdale	297	(112)
2020–2022	Salford City	61	(20)
2022–	Rochdale	152	(36)

International career
2003	England U18	3	(1)
2004–2005	England U20	1	(0)
- * Club domestic league appearances and goals as of 23:41, 4 January 2026 (UTC)

Ian Henderson (born 24 January 1985) is an English professional footballer who plays for EFL League Two club Rochdale. Henderson has played most of his career as a forward, but he has also been used in various midfield roles, he can operate on both sides of the pitch as a winger, and has captained his club on numerous occasions. Henderson is Rochdale's all-time leading goalscorer (with, as of 8 May 2025, 160 goals in all competitions, including 140 league goals).

Henderson started his career with Norwich City and made almost 70 first team appearances with them before joining Northampton Town in July 2007 following a six-month loan spell at Rotherham United. He remained at Northampton Town for 18 months and then played for Luton Town and in the Turkish football league with Ankaragücü, prior to signing for Colchester United in January 2010. Henderson hit 11 goals for Colchester United in the 2010–11 campaign, including home and away winners against Rochdale, and then scored again at Spotland for Colchester in October 2011. He scored 26 times in 130 outings for United, but left the club after manager Joe Dunne oversaw a shake-up of his squad earlier in 2013. Henderson was one of the most consistent performers in Rochdale's promotion campaign, missing only one game through suspension and scoring 11 goals, including several Goal of the Season contenders.

Henderson joined Rochdale on a free transfer in February 2013 after being released by Colchester. His performances led to the offer of a two-year contract, a deal which was extended until 2016.

Henderson has played internationally for England four times at under-18 and once at under-20 level, and is also eligible to represent Scotland.

== Club career ==
=== Norwich City ===
Born on 24 January 1985 in Bury St Edmunds, Suffolk, Henderson was a product of the Norwich City youth academy. He made his debut as substitute against Coventry City at Highfield Road in a 1–1 draw on 23 October 2002. He scored his first goal for the Canaries in a 4–2 defeat at Wimbledon on 2 November 2002, and was rewarded with a three-year professional contract at the end of January 2003, ending the season with 22 appearances. Following call-ups to both England Under-18s and Scotland Under-19s, the 2003–04 season saw Henderson win a First Division championship medal as Norwich won promotion to the Premier League. In November, he scored four goals in five games, including two in a 3–1 victory over Millwall at Carrow Road – and created a number of goals for other players. He signed a new contract in the summer of 2004 but found it difficult to establish himself in the team, making only a handful of appearances in the two subsequent seasons. His Norwich career suffered a further setback as a result of injuries.

==== Rotherham United (loan) ====
On 11 January 2007, after a five-month layoff caused by a knee injury, Henderson was loaned to Rotherham United to gain match fitness and experience in a deal at the end of the 2006–07 season. Henderson scored his only goal for Rotherham in their last home game of the season, a 4–2 defeat to Cheltenham Town. He made 18 appearances for the Millers, scoring once. At the end of the season, Henderson was released by the Canaries.

=== Northampton Town ===
Henderson signed for Northampton Town on 28 June 2007. On 27 December 2008, Northampton terminated Henderson's contract with immediate effect after Henderson did not start a game for the Cobblers during the 2008–09 season and he had failed to score in 33 first-team appearances.

=== Luton Town ===
Henderson signed for Luton Town on a short-term contract on 2 January 2009, and went on to make 18 league appearances in the 2008–09 season, scoring once against Dagenham & Redbridge. He was not offered a new contract at the end of the season, and was subsequently released from Luton.

=== Ankaragücü ===
Prior to the 2009–10 season, Henderson had a trial with Turkish Süper Lig side Ankaragücü, and on 27 July 2009, after a successful trial, signed a two-year contract until summer 2011. He made his debut for the Turkish club in the first league week of the 2009–10 season, coming on as a 59th minute substitute for Abdullah Çetin, in Ankaragücü's away game to Diyarbakirspor on 8 August 2009. After just six months in Turkey, Henderson had his contract with Ankaragucu cancelled.

=== Colchester United ===
On 7 January 2010, Henderson signed for Football League One side Colchester United on a 1p transfer. Henderson was sent off on his debut for Colchester United against his former club Norwich City. Henderson finished the 2010–11 season as top scorer for Colchester with 10 league goals and was the only one of United's players to hit double figures, attracting interest from other clubs with his contract set to expire. However, on 10 June 2011, Henderson signed a new contract with the U's. On 31 January 2013, Henderson had his contract with Colchester cancelled by mutual consent.

=== Rochdale ===
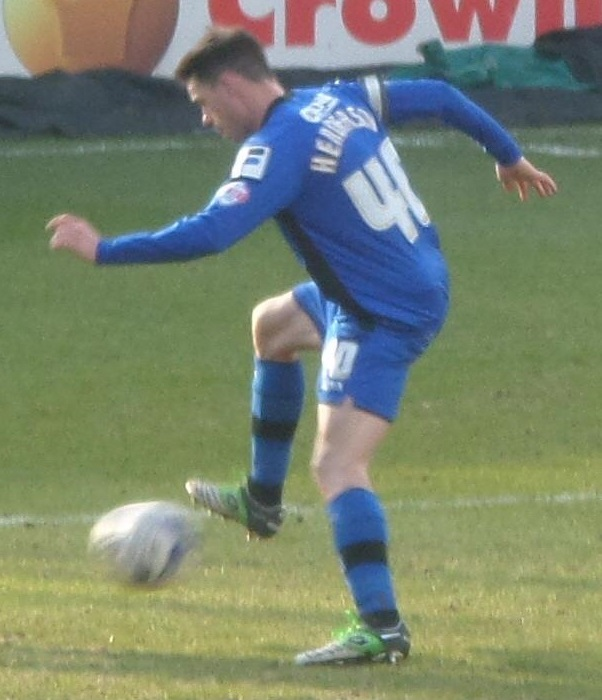
Henderson playing for Rochdale, 2015

After the cancellation of his contract with Colchester he joined Rochdale on a contract till the end of the season. In May 2013 he agreed a two-year extension at Rochdale. Henderson scored the second goal in the Rochdale shock 2–0 FA Cup victory against Leeds United on 4 January 2014. Henderson finished the 2014–15 season with 22 league goals and second highest total in the league that season.

On 23 October 2015, it was confirmed that Ian Henderson had signed a two-year contract extension at Rochdale and would be finishing his playing career at the club, citing a love for the club itself, the management, fans and his desire to settle down in the area.

=== Salford City ===
On 29 July 2020, Henderson signed for Salford City, on a two-year deal. On 12 September, he scored inside two minutes on his debut against Exeter City. The following week, he scored a hat-trick in a 4–0 away win against Grismby Town, becoming the first Salford player to score a hat-trick in the Football League. His four goals saw him win the EFL League Two Player of the Month award. After six goals and an assist in April 2021, Henderson was again awarded the Player of the Month award, his second of the season as well as manager Gary Bowyer winning the league's Manager of the Month award. He was released by Salford at the end of the 2021–22 season.

=== Return to Rochdale ===
Henderson returned to Rochdale ahead of the 2022–23 season on an initial one-year deal. On 8 November 2022 he became Rochdale's all-time leading goalscorer, scoring against his former club Salford City in a 1–0 home win to surpass Reg Jenkins' long standing record of 129 goals.

== International career ==
Henderson is eligible to play for Scotland through his Scottish father and since he had not played a UEFA/FIFA-recognised competitive match. In May 2003, he was called up to the England Under-18 squad for a tournament in Lisbon against Portugal, Sweden and Spain. Henderson played in all three games and had goals disallowed in the win over Sweden and the draw with Portugal but scored England's first in the 2–0 defeat of Spain that won England the Lisbon Trophy. Following this success, he was called up to the Scottish Under-19 side.

== Personal life ==
Henderson is the younger brother of Tommy Henderson, who was once also on the books at Carrow Road, but died in a car accident in December 2000.

== Career statistics ==
As of match played 5 May 2025

Club	Season	League			FA Cup		League Cup (Note: Appearances in EFL Cup, National League Cup)		Other		Total	
Club	Season	Division	Apps	Goals	Apps	Goals	Apps	Goals	Apps	Goals	Apps	Goals
Norwich City	2001–02	First Division	0	0	0	0	0	0	—		0	0
Norwich City	2002–03	First Division	20	1	2	0	0	0	—		22	1
Norwich City	2003–04	First Division	19	4	1	0	1	0	—		21	4
Norwich City	2004–05	Premier League	3	0	0	0	1	0	—		4	0
Norwich City	2005–06	Championship	24	1	1	0	3	0	—		28	1
Norwich City	2006–07	Championship	2	0	0	0	2	0	—		4	0
Norwich City	Total		68	6	4	0	7	0	0	0	79	6
Rotherham United (loan)	2006–07	League One	18	1	0	0	0	0	0	0	18	1
Northampton Town	2007–08	League One	23	0	2	0	2	0	0	0	27	0
Northampton Town	2008–09	League One	3	0	1	0	1	0	1 (Note: Appearance(s) in Football League Trophy)	0	6	0
Northampton Town	Total		26	0	3	0	3	0	1	0	33	0
Luton Town	2008–09	League Two	18	1	0	0	0	0	0	0	18	1
Ankaragücü	2009–10	Süper Lig	3	0	0	0	—		—		3	0
Colchester United	2009–10	League One	13	2	0	0	0	0	0	0	13	2
Colchester United	2010–11	League One	37	10	2	0	2	1	1	0	42	11
Colchester United	2011–12	League One	46	9	2	0	1	1	1	0	50	10
Colchester United	2012–13	League One	22	3	1	0	1	0	1	0	25	3
Colchester United	Total		118	24	5	0	4	2	3	0	130	26
Rochdale	2012–13	League Two	12	3	0	0	0	0	0	0	12	3
Rochdale	2013–14	League Two	45	11	4	1	1	0	2	0	52	12
Rochdale	2014–15	League One	44	22	4	0	1	0	1	0	50	22
Rochdale	2015–16	League One	39	13	1	0	2	0	0	0	42	13
Rochdale	2016–17	League One	42	15	3	2	2	1	2 (Note: Appearances in EFL Trophy)	1	49	19
Rochdale	2017–18	League One	39	13	7	6	2	0	2	1	50	20
Rochdale	2018–19	League One	45	20	2	1	2	0	0	0	49	21
Rochdale	2019–20	League One	31	15	6	0	2	1	0	0	39	16
Rochdale	Total		297	112	27	10	12	2	7	2	343	126
Salford City	2020–21	League Two	46	17	1	0	2	1	0	0	49	18
Salford City	2021–22	League Two	15	3	1	0	1	0	0	0	17	3
Salford City	Total		61	20	2	0	3	1	0	0	66	21
Rochdale	2022–23	League Two	44	8	1	0	2	0	3	2	50	10
Rochdale	2023–24	National League	39	11	1	0	—		1 (Note: Appearances in FA Trophy)	0	41	11
Rochdale	2024–25	National League	41	9	2	1	4	3	4	0	51	13
Rochdale	Total		124	28	4	1	6	3	8	2	142	34
Career total			733	192	45	11	35	8	19	4	832	215

== Honours ==
Norwich City

- Football League First Division: 2003–04

Rochdale

- Football League Two promotion: 2013–14
- National League play-offs: 2026

Individual

- PFA Team of the Year: 2013–14 League Two
- Rochdale Player of the Year: 2014–15, 2017–18, 2018–19
- EFL League Two Player of the Month: September 2020, April 2021
