= 2017–18 Rochdale A.F.C. season =

English football club season

Rochdale A.F.C.
2017–18 season
- Chairman: Chris Dunphy
- Manager: Keith Hill
- Stadium: Spotland Stadium
- League One: 20th
- FA Cup: Fifth round
- EFL Cup: Second round
- EFL Trophy: Third round
- Lancashire Senior Cup: First round
- Top goalscorer: League: Ian Henderson (13); All: Ian Henderson (20)
- Average home league attendance: 3,309
Home colours	Away colours

The 2017–18 season was Rochdale A.F.C.'s 111th in existence and their fourth consecutive season in League One. Along with competing in League One, the club participated in the FA Cup, EFL Cup and EFL Trophy. The season covers the period from 1 July 2017 to 30 June 2018.

== Statistics ==
As of 24 March 2018

No.	Pos	Nat	Player	Total		League One		FA Cup		League Cup		League Trophy	
No.	Pos	Nat	Player	Apps	Goals	Apps	Goals	Apps	Goals	Apps	Goals	Apps	Goals
1	GK	(England) ENG	Josh Lillis	52	0	40+0	0	7+0	0	1+0	0	4+0	0
2	DF	(Republic of Ireland) IRL	Joe Rafferty	46	1	30+3	1	7+0	0	2+0	0	4+0	0
3	DF	(South Africa) RSA	Kgosi Nthle	29	0	11+9	0	2+0	0	2+0	0	5+0	0
4	DF	(England) ENG	Jimmy McNulty	49	1	40+0	1	6+0	0	1+0	0	2+0	0
5	DF	(Republic of Ireland) IRL	Niall Canavan	6	0	3+0	0	0+0	0	2+0	0	1+0	0
6	DF	(England) ENG	Harrison McGahey	53	0	41+1	0	5+1	0	1+0	0	4+0	0
7	FW	(England) ENG	Stephen Humphrys	18	3	11+5	2	2+0	1	0+0	0	0+0	0
8	DF	(England) ENG	Reece Brown	4	0	2+1	0	0+0	0	1+0	0	0+0	0
9	FW	(England) ENG	Calvin Andrew	40	5	26+5	3	5+0	2	0+1	0	2+1	0
10	MF	(Northern Ireland) NIR	Callum Camps	53	4	41+1	2	6+0	1	1+0	1	3+1	0
11	MF	(England) ENG	Jordan Williams	20	0	7+5	0	0+1	0	1+1	0	2+3	0
12	DF	(Gibraltar) GIB	Scott Wiseman	13	0	7+6	0	0+0	0	0+0	0	0+0	0
14	MF	(England) ENG	Oliver Rathbone	42	1	30+3	1	2+2	0	1+0	0	4+0	0
15	MF	(England) ENG	Joe Thompson	11	1	3+7	1	0+1	0	0+0	0	0+0	0
16	MF	(England) ENG	Matt Done	56	9	39+6	7	6+1	2	2+0	0	1+1	0
17	MF	(Australia) AUS	Brad Inman	47	8	25+12	4	2+1	2	1+1	0	3+2	2
18	DF	(Republic of Ireland) IRL	Keith Keane	5	0	3+0	0	0+1	0	1+0	0	0+0	0
19	FW	(England) ENG	Steve Davies	36	8	7+25	7	0+2	1	0+2	0	0+0	0
21	DF	(Republic of Ireland) IRL	Ryan Delaney	22	2	16+2	2	4+0	0	0+0	0	0+0	0
22	GK	(United States) USA	Brendan Moore	8	0	6+0	0	0+0	0	1+0	0	1+0	0
25	MF	(England) ENG	Daniel Adshead	9	0	0+1	0	1+2	0	0+0	0	5+0	0
27	MF	(England) ENG	Andy Cannon	30	2	18+3	2	5+1	0	1+0	0	2+0	0
30	MF	(England) ENG	Billy Knott	4	0	1+3	0	0+0	0	0+0	0	0+0	0
31	DF	(England) ENG	Sam Hart	4	0	1+3	0	0+0	0	0+0	0	0+0	0
32	DF	(England) ENG	Mark Kitching	23	2	10+3	2	5+1	0	1+0	0	2+1	0
33	MF	(England) ENG	Alex Dobre	6	1	0+6	1	0+0	0	0+0	0	0+0	0
36	DF	(England) ENG	Matty Gillam	12	2	1+7	1	1+0	0	0+1	0	1+1	1
40	FW	(England) ENG	Ian Henderson	50	20	39+0	13	7+0	6	2+0	0	1+1	1
Player(s) who left during the season:
7	FW	(England) ENG	Jordan Slew	8	1	0+5	0	0+1	0	0+0	0	2+0	1
12	MF	(Wales) WAL	Jordan Williams	14	0	12+0	0	0+0	0	0+0	0	2+0	0
24	MF	(Northern Ireland) NIR	Jamie Allen	4	0	3+1	0	0+0	0	0+0	0	0+0	0
29	DF	(Montserrat) MSR	Donervon Daniels	18	0	14+1	0	3+0	0	0+0	0	0+0	0
39	DF	(England) ENG	Joe Bunney	27	1	18+2	0	2+0	0	0+0	0	5+0	1

=== Goals record ===
As of 6 May 2018

Rank	No.	Nat.	Po.	Name	League One	FA Cup	League Cup	League Trophy	Total
1	40	(England)	CF	Ian Henderson	13	6	0	1	20
2	16	(England)	LM	Matt Done	7	2	0	0	9
3	17	(Australia)	AM	Brad Inman	4	2	0	2	8
3	19	(England)	CF	Steve Davies	7	1	0	0	8
5	9	(England)	CF	Calvin Andrew	3	2	0	0	5
6	10	(Northern Ireland)	CM	Callum Camps	2	1	1	0	4
7	7	(England)	CF	Stephen Humphrys	2	1	0	0	3
8	21	(Republic of Ireland)	CB	Ryan Delaney	2	0	0	0	2
8	27	(England)	CM	Andy Cannon	2	0	0	0	2
8	32	(England)	LM	Mark Kitching	2	0	0	0	2
8	36	(England)	CF	Matty Gillam	1	0	0	1	2
12	2	(Republic of Ireland)	RB	Joe Rafferty	1	0	0	0	1
12	4	(England)	CB	Jimmy McNulty	1	0	0	0	1
12	14	(England)	CM	Oliver Rathbone	1	0	0	0	1
12	15	(England)	CM	Joe Thompson	1	0	0	0	1
12	33	(England)	CM	Alex Dobre	1	0	0	0	1
12	–	(England)	LB	Joe Bunney	0	0	0	1	1
12	–	(England)	CF	Jordan Slew	0	0	0	1	1
Total					50	15	1	6	72

=== Disciplinary record ===
As of 6 May 2018

Rank	No.	Nat.	Po.	Name	League One			FA Cup			League Cup			League Trophy			Total		
Rank	No.	Nat.	Po.	Name	Yellow card	(yellow card) (yellow-red card)	Red card	Yellow card	(yellow card) (yellow-red card)	Red card	Yellow card	(yellow card) (yellow-red card)	Red card	Yellow card	(yellow card) (yellow-red card)	Red card	Yellow card	(yellow card) (yellow-red card)	Red card
1	10	(Northern Ireland)	CM	Callum Camps	9	0	0	1	0	0	0	0	0	1	0	0	11	0	0
2	14	(England)	CM	Oliver Rathbone	7	0	0	1	0	0	1	0	0	0	0	0	9	0	0
3	4	(England)	CB	Jimmy McNulty	5	0	0	2	0	0	0	0	0	0	0	0	7	0	0
4	27	(England)	RM	Andy Cannon	4	0	0	1	0	0	0	0	0	1	0	0	6	0	0
5	2	(Republic of Ireland)	RB	Joe Rafferty	3	0	0	1	0	0	0	0	0	1	0	0	5	0	0
5	6	(England)	CB	Harrison McGahey	4	0	0	1	0	0	0	0	0	0	0	0	5	0	0
5	32	(England)	CF	Mark Kitching	3	0	0	1	0	0	0	0	0	1	0	0	5	0	0
5	—	(England)	LB	Joe Bunney	5	0	0	0	0	0	0	0	0	0	0	0	5	0	0
5	—	(Wales)	DM	Jordan Williams	5	0	0	0	0	0	0	0	0	0	0	0	5	0	0
10	9	(England)	CF	Calvin Andrew	3	0	0	1	0	0	0	0	0	0	0	0	4	0	0
10	19	(England)	CF	Steven Davies	3	0	0	1	0	0	0	0	0	0	0	0	4	0	0
10	40	(England)	CF	Ian Henderson	3	0	1	0	0	0	0	0	0	0	0	0	3	0	1
13	3	(South Africa)	LB	Kgosi Nthle	1	0	0	0	0	0	0	0	0	1	0	0	2	0	0
13	16	(England)	LM	Matt Done	2	0	0	0	0	0	0	0	0	0	0	0	2	0	0
13	21	(Republic of Ireland)	CB	Ryan Delaney	2	0	0	0	0	0	0	0	0	0	0	0	2	0	0
13	31	(England)	LB	Sam Hart	2	0	0	0	0	0	0	0	0	0	0	0	2	0	0
13	—	(Montserrat)	CB	Donervon Daniels	1	0	0	1	0	0	0	0	0	0	0	0	2	0	0
18	1	(England)	GK	Josh Lillis	1	0	0	0	0	0	0	0	0	0	0	0	1	0	0
18	7	(England)	CF	Stephen Humphrys	1	0	0	0	0	0	0	0	0	0	0	0	1	0	0
18	11	(England)	LW	Jordan Williams	1	0	0	0	0	0	0	0	0	0	0	0	1	0	0
18	15	(England)	CM	Joe Thompson	1	0	0	0	0	0	0	0	0	0	0	0	1	0	0
18	17	(Australia)	CM	Brad Inman	1	0	0	0	0	0	0	0	0	0	0	0	1	0	0
18	18	(Republic of Ireland)	CB	Keith Keane	0	0	1	0	0	0	0	0	0	0	0	0	0	0	1
18	—	(England)	CF	Jordan Slew	1	0	0	0	0	0	0	0	0	0	0	0	1	0	0
Total					67	0	2	11	0	0	1	0	0	5	0	0	84	0	2

== Transfers ==
=== Transfers in ===
Date from	Position	Nationality	Name	From	Fee	Ref.
1 July 2017	CB	(England)	Reece Brown	Bury	Free	
1 July 2017	GK	(United States)	Brendan Moore	Torquay United	Free	
1 July 2017	CF	(England)	Jordan Williams	Barrow	Undisclosed	
27 July 2017	LB	(South Africa)	Kgosi Ntlhe	Stevenage	Free	
3 August 2017	LM	(England)	Matt Done	Sheffield United	Free	
12 September 2017	CF	(England)	Jordan Slew	Plymouth Argyle	Free	
9 January 2018	DF	(Republic of Ireland)	Ryan Delaney	Burton Albion	Undisclosed	

=== Transfers out ===
Date from	Position	Nationality	Name	To	Fee	Ref.
1 July 2017	GK	(England)	Johny Diba	Ashton United	Released	(Note: Johny Diba joined Ashton United following his release.)
1 July 2017	GK	(Republic of Ireland)	Conrad Logan	Mansfield Town	Free	
1 July 2017	CM	(Northern Ireland)	Matty Lund	Burton Albion	Free	
1 July 2017	LW	(England)	Nathaniel Mendez-Laing	Cardiff City	Free	
1 July 2017	ST	(England)	David Owusu	Free agent	Released	
1 July 2017	RM	(Jersey)	Peter Vincenti	Coventry City	Free	
13 July 2017	AM	(Republic of Ireland)	Donal McDermott	Swindon Town	Free	
31 August 2017	CM	(England)	Jamie Allen	Burton Albion	Undisclosed	
16 January 2018	DF	(England)	Joe Bunney	Northampton Town	Undisclosed	

=== Loans in ===
Start date	Position	Nationality	Name	From	End date	Ref.
1 July 2017	CM	(Australia)	Brad Inman	Peterborough United	30 June 2018	
31 August 2017	CB	(England)	Donervon Daniels	Wigan Athletic	30 June 2018	
31 August 2017	DM	(Wales)	Jordan Williams	Liverpool	30 June 2018	
11 January 2018	MF	(England)	Billy Knott	Lincoln City	End of season	
17 January 2018	DF	(England)	Sam Hart	Blackburn Rovers	End of season	
18 January 2018	MF	(Romania)	Mihai Dobre	AFC Bournemouth	End of season	
31 January 2018	FW	(England)	Stephen Humphrys	Fulham	End of season	
31 January 2018	DF	(Gibraltar)	Scott Wiseman	Chesterfield	End of season	

=== Loans out ===
Start date	Position	Nationality	Name	To	End date	Ref.
27 August 2017	CB	(Northern Ireland)	Keith Kearney	Chorley	17 September 2017	
27 August 2017	DF	(England)	Isaac Ward	Chorley	17 September 2017	
10 October 2017	CB	(Northern Ireland)	Keith Kearney	Radcliffe Borough	31 October 2017	
8 November 2017	CB	(Northern Ireland)	Keith Kearney	Radcliffe Borough	6 December 2017	
12 January 2018	MF	(England)	Jordan Williams	Lincoln City	End of season	

== Competitions ==
=== Friendlies ===
As of 23 June 2017, Rochdale have announced six pre-season friendlies against Chorley Barnsley, Morecambe, FC Halifax Town, AFC Fylde and Middlesbrough.

15 July 2017	AFC Fylde	0–1	Rochdale	Medlar-with-Wesham
15:00 BST		Report	Davies 50'	Stadium: Mill Farm

18 July 2017	Chorley	0–4	Rochdale	Chorley
19:45 BST		Report	Trialist 35', 53', 56'; Davies 88'	Stadium: Victory Park

18 July 2017	FC Halifax Town	2–0	Rochdale	Halifax
19:30 BST	Denton 53'; Kosylo 66'	Report		Stadium: The Shay

22 July 2017	Rochdale	2–0	Middlesbrough	Spotland
15:00 BST	Ayala 51' (o.g.); Rathbone 87'	Report		Stadium: Spotland Stadium

25 July 2017	Rochdale	0–2	Barnsley	Spotland
19:30 BST		Report	Ugbo 68', 89'	Stadium: Spotland Stadium

29 July 2017	Morecambe	0–1	Rochdale	Morecambe
15:00 BST		Report	Davies 53'	Stadium: Globe Arena

=== League One ===
==== League table ====
Pos	Team	Pld	W	D	L	GF	GA	GD	Pts	Promotion, qualification or relegation
18	AFC Wimbledon	46	13	14	19	47	58	−11	53	
19	Walsall	46	13	13	20	53	66	−13	52	
20	Rochdale	46	11	18	17	49	57	−8	51	
21	Oldham Athletic (R)	46	11	17	18	58	75	−17	50	Relegation to EFL League Two
22	Northampton Town (R)	46	12	11	23	43	77	−34	47	Relegation to EFL League Two

Source: BBC Sport
Rules for classification: 1) Points; 2) Goal difference; 3) Number of goals scored
(R) Relegated

==== Results summary ====
Overall								Home						Away					
Pld	W	D	L	GF	GA	GD	Pts	W	D	L	GF	GA	GD	W	D	L	GF	GA	GD
26	4	10	12	26	37	−11	22	4	5	3	13	11	+2	0	5	9	13	26	−13

Last updated: 13 January 2018.

==== Results by matchday ====
Matchday	1	2	3	4	5	6	7	8	9	10	11	12	13	14	15	16	17	18	19	20	21	22	23	24	25	26	27	28	29	30	31	32	33	34	35	36	37	38	39	40	41	42	43	44	45	46
Ground	A	H	A	H	A	H	H	A	H	A	A	H	A	H	H	A	A	A	H	A	H	H	A	A	H	A	A	A	H	A	A	A	H	H	H	A	H	A	H	H	A	H	H	H	A	H
Result	L	D	L	D	D	L	W	L	W	D	D	L	D	D	W	D	L	L	W	L	D	D	L	L	L	L	W	L	D	L	W	W	D	D	L	D	W	W	D	L	W	D	D	D	L	W
Position	23	19	21	22	21	21	18	21	18	17	17	18	20	20	17	19	22	22	19	19	21	23	23	23	23	23	23	24	23	24	23	22	23	23	23	23	23	22	21	21	21	21	21	19	21	20

Updated to match(es) played on 13 January 2018. Source: Statto.com
A = Away; H = Home; W = Win; D = Draw; L = Loss

==== Matches ====
On 21 June 2017, the league fixtures were announced.

5 August 2017 1	Portsmouth	2–0	Rochdale	Portsmouth
15:00 BST	Pitman 46', 90+2'; Lowe (red card) 81'	Report	Keane (red card) 21'	Stadium: Fratton Park; Attendance: 18,009; Referee: Lee Probert

12 August 2017 2	Rochdale	1–1	Scunthorpe United	Rochdale
15:00 BST	Davies 55'	Report	Holmes 63'	Stadium: Spotland Stadium; Attendance: 3,218; Referee: Ross Joyce

19 August 2017 3	Shrewsbury Town	3–2	Rochdale	Shrewsbury
15:00 BST	Whalley 30' (pen.); Morris 33'; Payne 74'	Report	Davies 17' (pen.), 63' (pen.); McGahey (yellow card) 67'; Rafferty (yellow card) 68'	Stadium: New Meadow; Attendance: 5,001; Referee: Andy Haines

26 August 2017 4	Rochdale	0–0	Bury	Rochdale
15:00 BST	Cannon (yellow card) 43'; Done (yellow card) 65'	Report	Murphy (red card) 54'; Williams (yellow card) 90+2'	Stadium: Spotland Stadium; Attendance: 4,601; Referee: John Brooks

2 September 2017 5	Southend United	0–0	Rochdale	Southend-on-Sea
15:00 BST	McLaughlin (yellow card) 35'; Cox (yellow card) 45+3'; Bwomono (yellow card) 83'	Report	Kitching (yellow card) 20'; Williams (yellow card) 43'; Henderson (red card) 50'; McNulty (yellow card) 87'	Stadium: Roots Hall; Attendance: 6,208; Referee: Tim Robinson

9 September 2017 6	Rochdale	0–3	Blackburn Rovers	Rochdale
15:00 BST		Report	Smallwood 10'; Antonsson 57'; Dack (yellow card) 70'; Graham 79'	Stadium: Spotland Stadium; Attendance: 6,524; Referee: Steve Martin

12 September 2017 7	Rochdale	2–1	Doncaster Rovers	Rochdale
19:45 BST	Bunney (yellow card) 45'; McNulty (yellow card) 87'; Kitching 90+2'; Davies 90+4'	Report	Williams (yellow card) 40'; Marquis 74'	Stadium: Spotland Stadium; Attendance: 2,371; Referee: Ben Toner

16 September 2017 8	Milton Keynes Dons	3–2	Rochdale	Milton Keynes
15:00 BST	Ariyibi 13', 41'; Gilbey (yellow card) 51'; Seager 84'	Report	Inman 8'; McGahey (yellow card) 22'; Done 42'; Cannon (yellow card) 51'	Stadium: Stadium mk Attendance: 7,670; Referee: Gavin Ward

23 September 2017 9	Rochdale	3–0	Gillingham	Rochdale
15:00 BST	Henderson 24'; Rafferty 26'; Davies (yellow card) 36'; Williams (yellow card) 57'; Done 90+1'	Report	Eaves (yellow card) 30' (yellow-red card) 44'; Zakuani (yellow card) 48'	Stadium: Spotland Stadium; Attendance: 2,793; Referee: Eddie Ilderton

26 September 2017 10	Blackpool	0–0	Rochdale	Blackpool
19:45 BST	Ryan (yellow card) 72'	Report		Stadium: Bloomfield Road; Attendance: 3,399; Referee: David Webb

30 September 2017 11	AFC Wimbledon	0–0	Rochdale	Norbiton
15:00 BST		Report	Williams (yellow card) 31'; Bunney (yellow card) 50'	Stadium: Kingsmeadow; Attendance: 3,861; Referee: Chris Sarginson

7 October 2017 12	Rochdale	0–1	Rotherham United	Rochdale
15:00 BST	Bunney (yellow card) 43'; Williams (yellow card) 46'; McNulty (yellow card) 56'; Henderson (yellow card) 69'	Report	Wood 57'; Potter (yellow card) 76'; Williams (yellow card) 90+5'	Stadium: Spotland Stadium; Attendance: 4,113; Referee: David Coote

14 October 2017 13	Fleetwood Town	2–2	Rochdale	Fleetwood
15:00 BST	Eastham 25'; Burns (red card) 65'; Cole 83'	Report	Inman 48'; Henderson 53'	Stadium: Highbury Stadium; Attendance: 3,260; Referee: John Brooks

17 October 2017 14	Rochdale	2–2	Northampton Town	Rochdale
19:45 BST	Bunney (yellow card) 10'; Henderson 25', 62'; Rafferty (yellow card) 88'	Report	Taylor 70'; Buchanan 78'; O'Toole (yellow card) 89'	Stadium: Spotland Stadium; Attendance: 2,138; Referee: Darren Drysdale

21 October 2017 15	Rochdale	1–0	Bristol Rovers	Rochdale
15:00 BST	Done 7'	Report	Harrison (yellow card) 63'; Sinclair (yellow card) 87'	Stadium: Spotland Stadium; Attendance: 2,944; Referee: Scott Oldham

28 October 2017 16	Plymouth Argyle	1–1	Rochdale	Plymouth
15:00 BST	Grant 1'	Report	Done 33'; Williams (yellow card) 53'	Stadium: Home Park; Attendance: 8,805; Referee: Gavin Ward

11 November 2017 P	Rochdale	v	Wigan Athletic	Rochdale
15:00 GMT				Stadium: Spotland Stadium
Note: On 4 November 2017, the planned Wigan Athletic home fixture was postponed due to international call-ups.

18 November 2017 17	Oldham Athletic	3–1	Rochdale	Oldham
15:00 GMT	Dummigan 2'; Gardner (yellow card) 44'; Fané (yellow card) 59'; Placide (yellow card) 74'; Doyle 83', 86'	Report	Done 16'	Stadium: Boundary Park; Attendance: 6,129; Referee: Jeremy Simpson

21 November 2017 18	Charlton Athletic	2–1	Rochdale	Charlton
19:45 GMT	Forster-Caskey 35', 60'	Report	Gillam 13'; Rathbone (yellow card) 34'; Camps (yellow card) 56'; Henderson (yellow card) 64'	Stadium: The Valley; Attendance: 8,801; Referee: Charles Breakspear

25 November 2017 19	Rochdale	2–0	Peterborough United	Rochdale
15:00 GMT	Slew (yellow card) 21'; Andrew 33'; Camps 36'; Rathbone (yellow card) 68'; McNulty (yellow card) 90+1'	Report		Stadium: Spotland Stadium; Attendance: 2,555; Referee: Martin Coy

9 December 2017 20	Bradford City	4–3	Rochdale	Bradford
15:00 GMT	Kilgallon 8'; Wyke 40'; Poleon 42'; Robinson 78'; Vincelot (yellow card) 82'	Report	Henderson 41', 45+2'; Davies 75'; Rathbone (yellow card) 88'	Stadium: Valley Parade; Attendance: 19,621; Referee: Darren Bond

16 December 2017 21	Rochdale	0–0	Oxford United	Rochdale
15:00 GMT		Report		Stadium: Spotland Stadium; Attendance: 2,588; Referee: Carl Boyeson

23 December 2017 22	Rochdale	1–1	Walsall	Rochdale
15:00 GMT	Andrew 63'; Bunney (yellow card) 80'; Daniels (yellow card) 90'	Report	Guthrie (yellow card) 50'; Maziar Kouhyar 90'	Stadium: Spotland Stadium; Attendance: 2,702; Referee: Andy Haines

26 December 2017 23	Blackburn Rovers	2–0	Rochdale	Blackburn
15:00 GMT	Smallwood (yellow card) 24'; Ntlhe 35' (o.g.); Mulgrew 42' (pen.); Williams (yellow card) 84'; Nuttall (yellow card) 85'	Report		Stadium: Ewood Park; Attendance: 15,115; Referee: Michael Salisbury

29 December 2017 25	Doncaster Rovers	2–0	Rochdale	Doncaster
19:45 GMT	Whiteman 4'; May 27'; Marquis (yellow card) 64'	Report	Daniels (yellow card) 62'	Stadium: Keepmoat Stadium; Attendance: 7,997; Referee: Ross Joyce

1 January 2018 25	Rochdale	1–2	Blackpool	Rochdale
15:00 GMT	Kitching 90+3'	Report	Ryan (yellow card) 4'; Delfouneso 54'; Mafoumbi (yellow card) 60'; Mellor 67'	Stadium: Spotland Stadium; Attendance: 3,165; Referee: Anthony Backhouse

13 January 2018 26	Gillingham	2–1	Rochdale	Gillingham
15:00 GMT	Garmston 41'; Martin 63'; Eaves (yellow card) 77'		Ntlhe (yellow card) 7'; Cannon 27' (yellow card) 87'; Camps (yellow card) 75'	Stadium: Priestfield Stadium; Attendance: 4,352; Referee: Lee Swabey

20 January 2018 P	Rochdale	v	Southend United	Rochdale
15:00 GMT				Stadium: Spotland Stadium

27 January 2018 P	Walsall	v	Rochdale	Walsall
15:00 GMT				Stadium: Bescot Stadium

3 February 2018 27	Northampton Town	0–1	Rochdale	Northampton
15:00 GMT	Long (yellow card) 31'; Crooks (yellow card) 73'; Poole (yellow card) 79'	Report	Andrew 53'; Camps (yellow card) 67'	Stadium: Sixfields Stadium; Attendance: 5,475; Referee: John Busby

10 February 2018 P	Rochdale	v	Fleetwood Town	Rochdale
15:00 GMT				Stadium: Spotland Stadium

13 February 2018 28	Bristol Rovers	3–2	Rochdale	Horfield
19:45 GMT	Sercombe 49'; Partington 65', (yellow card) 71'; Lines 79', Lines (yellow card) 90+4'	Report	Henderson 29', 66'; Cannon (yellow card) 45+1'; Camps (yellow card) 78'	Stadium: Memorial Stadium; Attendance: 9,219; Referee: Chris Sarginson

21 February 2018 29	Rochdale	0–0	Milton Keynes Dons	Rochdale
19:45 GMT	Done (yellow card) 50'	Report	McGrandles (yellow card) 60'; Ward (yellow card) 73'	Stadium: Spotland Stadium; Attendance: 2,273; Referee: Ross Joyce

24 February 2018 30	Wigan Athletic	1–0	Rochdale	Wigan
15:00 GMT	Jacobs 12'	Report	McNulty (yellow card) 36'; Camps (yellow card) 55'	Stadium: DW Stadium; Attendance: 8,654; Referee: Ben Toner

6 March 2018 31	Walsall	0–3	Rochdale	Walsall
19:45 GMT	Leahy (yellow card) 66'	Report	McNulty 16'; Henderson 71'; Dobre 87'	Stadium: Bescot Stadium; Attendance: 3,505; Referee: Robert Lewis

10 March 2018 32	Rotherham United	0–1	Rochdale	Rotherham
15:00 GMT	Wood (yellow card) 88'; Newell (yellow card) 90+5'	Report	Humphrys 67'; Hart (yellow card) 86'; Davies (yellow card) 90+19'	Stadium: New York Stadium; Attendance: 8,418; Referee: Graham Salisbury

13 March 2018 33	Rochdale	0–0	Southend United	Rochdale
19:45 GMT	Delaney (yellow card) 58'	Report	Kightly (yellow card) 27'; Demetriou (yellow card) 51'	Stadium: Spotland Stadium; Attendance: 2,286; Referee: Eddie Ilderton

17 March 2018 34	Rochdale	1–1	AFC Wimbledon	Rochdale
15:00 GMT	Cannon 25'; Henderson (yellow card) 31'	Report	Oshilaja 7'	Stadium: Spotland Stadium; Attendance: 2,667; Referee: Scott Oldham

20 March 2018 35	Rochdale	0–2	Fleetwood Town	Rochdale
19:45 GMT		Report	Madden (yellow card) 37' (goal) 63'; Hunter (yellow card) 38'; Hiwula 90'	Stadium: Spotland Stadium; Attendance: 2,403; Referee: Trevor Kettle

24 March 2018 36	Scunthorpe United	1–1	Rochdale	Scunthorpe
15:00 GMT	Toney 51'; Ojo (yellow card) 68'	Report	Camps 20'; Rathbone (yellow card) 35'; Hart (yellow card) 50'; Andrew (yellow card) 68'	Stadium: Glanford Park; Attendance: 3,789; Referee: John Brooks

30 March 2018 37	Rochdale	3–1	Shrewsbury Town	Rochdale
15:00 GMT	Rathbone 45+12'; Davies 80'; Henderson 90+6'	Report	Thomas 8'; Morris (yellow card) 89'	Stadium: Spotland Stadium; Attendance: 4,098; Referee: Richard Clark

3 April 2018 38	Bury	0–2	Rochdale	Bury
19:45 GMT		Report	Delaney 30'; Henderson 43'	Stadium: Gigg Lane; Attendance: 4,628; Referee: Geoff Eltringham

7 April 2018 39	Rochdale	3–3	Portsmouth	Rochdale
15:00	Inman 13'; Humphrys 57'; Henderson 71'	Report	Pitman 26', 62'; Done 90+2' (o.g.)	Stadium: Spotland Stadium; Attendance: 3,781; Referee: Andy Haines

10 April 2018 40	Rochdale	1–4	Wigan Athletic	Rochdale
19:45	Rafferty (yellow card) 71'; Davies 87' (pen.)	Report	Burn 17'; Vaughan 54'; Jacobs 60'; Grigg 62'; Walton (yellow card) 88'	Stadium: Spotland Stadium; Attendance: 3,850; Referee: David Webb

14 April 2018 41	Peterborough United	0–1	Rochdale	Peterborough
15:00		Report	Henderson 16' (red card) 53'; Camps (yellow card) 36'; Kitching (yellow card) 38'; Andrew (yellow card) 87'	Stadium: London Road Stadium; Attendance: 5,496; Referee: Antony Coggins

17 April 2018 42	Rochdale	0–0	Oldham Athletic	Rochdale
19:45	Thompson (yellow card) 55'	Report	Fané (yellow card) 38'; Hunt (yellow card) 55'; Edmundson (yellow card) 57'; Haymer (yellow card) 76'; Gardner (yellow card) 80'	Stadium: Spotland Stadium; Attendance: 6,261; Referee: Peter Bankes

21 April 2018 43	Rochdale	1–1	Bradford City	Rochdale
15:00	Rathbone (yellow card) 22'; Done 41'; Lillis (yellow card) 74'; Humphrys (yellow card) 88'; Rafferty (yellow card) 89'; McGahey (yellow card) 90+6'	Report	Wyke 90+1'	Stadium: Spotland Stadium; Attendance: 4,365; Referee: Ollie Yates

24 April 2018 44	Rochdale	1–1	Plymouth Argyle	Rochdale
19:45	Delaney 55'	Report	Fox (yellow card) 5'; Vyner (yellow card) 17'; Grant 53'; Carey (yellow card) 64'	Stadium: Spotland Stadium; Attendance: 2,760; Referee: Darren Drysdale

28 April 2018 45	Oxford United	2–1	Rochdale	Oxford
15:00 BST	Mousinho 62' (pen.); Hall (yellow card) 78'; Ledson (yellow card) 81'; Kane 83' (pen.)	Report	Inman 59'; Camps (yellow card) 62'; Delaney (yellow card) 80'; Rathbone (yellow card) 81'	Stadium: Kassam Stadium; Attendance: 8,375; Referee: Nick Kinseley

5 May 2018 46	Rochdale	1-0	Charlton Athletic	Rochdale
17:30	McGahey (yellow card) 26'; Thompson 69'	Report		Stadium: Spotland Stadium; Attendance: 5,294; Referee: Tony Harrington

=== FA Cup ===
In the FA Cup, Rochdale were drawn at home to Bromley in the first round, Slough Town away in the second round and Doncaster Rovers away in the third round.

4 November 2017 First round	Rochdale	4–0	Bromley	Spotland
15:00 GMT	Inman 10', 53'; Henderson 31' (pen.), 84'; McNulty (yellow card) 64'	Report	Sutherland (yellow card) 35'; Williams (red card) 75'	Stadium: Spotland Stadium; Attendance: 2,241; Referee: Andrew Miller

4 December 2017 Second round	Slough Town	0–4	Rochdale	Slough
19:45 GMT		Report	Andrew 13'; Camps 68'; Henderson 89'; Done 90+2'	Stadium: Arbour Park; Attendance: 1,950; Referee: Robert Jones

6 January 2018 Third round	Doncaster Rovers	0–1	Rochdale	Doncaster
15:00 GMT	Marquis (yellow card) 28'	Report	McNulty (yellow card) 1'; Andrew 18'; Daniels (yellow card) 72'	Stadium: Keepmoat Stadium; Attendance: 4,513; Referee: Andy Woolmer

27 January 2018 Fourth round	Millwall	2–2	Rochdale	London
15:00 GMT	Wallace 17' (pen.); Thompson 90'	Report	Henderson 32'; Camps (yellow card) 35'; Andrew (yellow card) 52'; Done 53'	Stadium: The Den; Attendance: 8,346; Referee: Andrew Madley

6 February 2018 Fourth round replay	Rochdale	1–0	Millwall	Rochdale
19:45 GMT	Henderson 53'; Cannon (yellow card) 35'; Kitching (yellow card) 90+4'	Report	McLaughlin (yellow card) 85'	Stadium: Spotland Stadium; Attendance: 2,790; Referee: Tim Robinson

18 February 2018 Fifth round	Rochdale	2–2	Tottenham Hotspur	Rochdale
16:00 GMT	Henderson 45'; Rafferty (yellow card) 73'; Rathbone (yellow card) 85'; McGahey (yellow card) 88'; Davies 90+3'	Report	Lucas 59'; Alderweireld (yellow card) 64'; Kane 88' (pen.)	Stadium: Spotland Stadium; Attendance: 8,480; Referee: Bobby Madley

28 February 2018 Fifth round replay	Tottenham Hotspur	6–1	Rochdale	Wembley
	Son 23', 65', (yellow card) 28'; Foyth (yellow card) 44'; Lamela (yellow card) 45+5'; Llorente 47', 53', 59'; Walker-Peters 90+3'	Report	Humphrys 31'	Stadium: Wembley Stadium; Attendance: 24,627; Referee: Paul Tierney

=== EFL Cup ===
On 16 June 2017, Rochdale were drawn away to Mansfield Town in the first round.

8 August 2017 First round	Mansfield Town	0–1	Rochdale	Mansfield
19:45 BST		Report	Camps 17'	Stadium: Field Mill; Attendance: 1,457; Referee: Andy Madley

23 August 2017 Second round	Stoke City	4–0	Rochdale	Stoke-on-Trent
19:45 BST	Allen 16', 42'; Crouch 29'; Sobhi 81'	Report		Stadium: bet 365 Stadium; Attendance: 9,930; Referee: Scott Duncan

=== EFL Trophy ===
On 12 July 2017, Rochdale were drawn in the Northern Group C against Blackburn Rovers, Bury and Stoke City U23s. As winners of their group, Rochdale were drawn at home to Doncaster Rovers in the second round. A home tie against Lincoln City was confirmed for the third round stage.

Pos	Lge	Team	Pld	W	PW	PL	L	GF	GA	GD	Pts	Qualification
1	L1	Rochdale (Q)	3	1	1	1	0	5	1	+4	6	Round 2
2	L1	Blackburn Rovers	3	1	0	1	1	2	2	0	4	Round 2
3	L1	Bury	2	1	0	0	1	1	4	−3	3	
4	ACA	Stoke City U21s	2	0	1	0	1	0	1	−1	2	

Updated to match(es) played on 7 November 2017. Source: EFL.com
(Q) Qualified to the phase indicated

19 September 2017 Group Game 1	Bury	0–4	Rochdale	Bury
19:45 BST	Danns (yellow card) 6'; Shotton (yellow card) 60'	Report	Bunney 12'; Inman 18', 34'; Henderson 51'; Rafferty (yellow card) 62'	Stadium: Gigg Lane; Attendance: 1,451; Referee: Mark Heywood

3 October 2017 Group Game 2	Rochdale	0–0 (4–5 p)	Stoke City U23s	Spotland
19:45 BST	Ntlhe (yellow card) 74'	Report	Edwards (red card) 24'; Waddington (yellow card) 41'	Stadium: Spotland Stadium; Referee: Martin Coy
	Penalties
	Slew (penalty scored); Done (penalty missed); Williams (penalty scored); Kitching (penalty scored); Rafferty (penalty scored); Williams (penalty missed); Rathbone (penalty missed)		Campbell (penalty scored); Souttar (penalty missed); Pemberton (penalty scored); Waddington (penalty scored); Jarvis (penalty scored); McJannett (penalty missed); Shenton (penalty scored)

7 November 2017 Group Game 3	Rochdale	1–1 (5–3 p)	Blackburn Rovers	Spotland
19:45 GMT	Slew 72'	Report	Wharton (red card) 28'; Hart (yellow card) 41'; Nuttall 43'	Stadium: Spotland Stadium; Attendance: 1,080; Referee: Antony Backhouse
	Penalties
	Rafferty (penalty scored); Inman (penalty scored); Slew (penalty scored); Gillam (penalty scored); Bunney (penalty scored)		Hart (penalty scored); Ward (penalty scored); Smallwood (penalty missed); Bennett (penalty scored)

28 November 2017 Second round	Rochdale	1–1 (5–4 p)	Doncaster Rovers	Spotland
19:30 GMT	Gillam 33' (pen.); Camps (yellow card) 53'; Kitching (yellow card) 79'	Report	Whiteman (yellow card) 55'; Mandeville 72'	Stadium: Spotland Stadium; Attendance: 786
	Penalties
	Andrew (penalty scored); McGahey (penalty scored); Bunney (penalty scored); Inman (penalty scored); Kitching (penalty scored)		Mason (penalty scored); Mandeville (penalty scored); Ben Khémis (penalty scored); Alcock (penalty scored); Rowe (penalty missed)

9 January 2018 Third round	Rochdale	0–1	Lincoln City	Spotland
19:45 GMT	Cannon (yellow card) 79'	Report	Green (yellow card) 15'; Woodyard (yellow card) 19'; Palmer 88'	Stadium: Spotland Stadium; Attendance: 1,171; Referee: Ben Toner
