= Mark Kitching =

English footballer (born 1995)

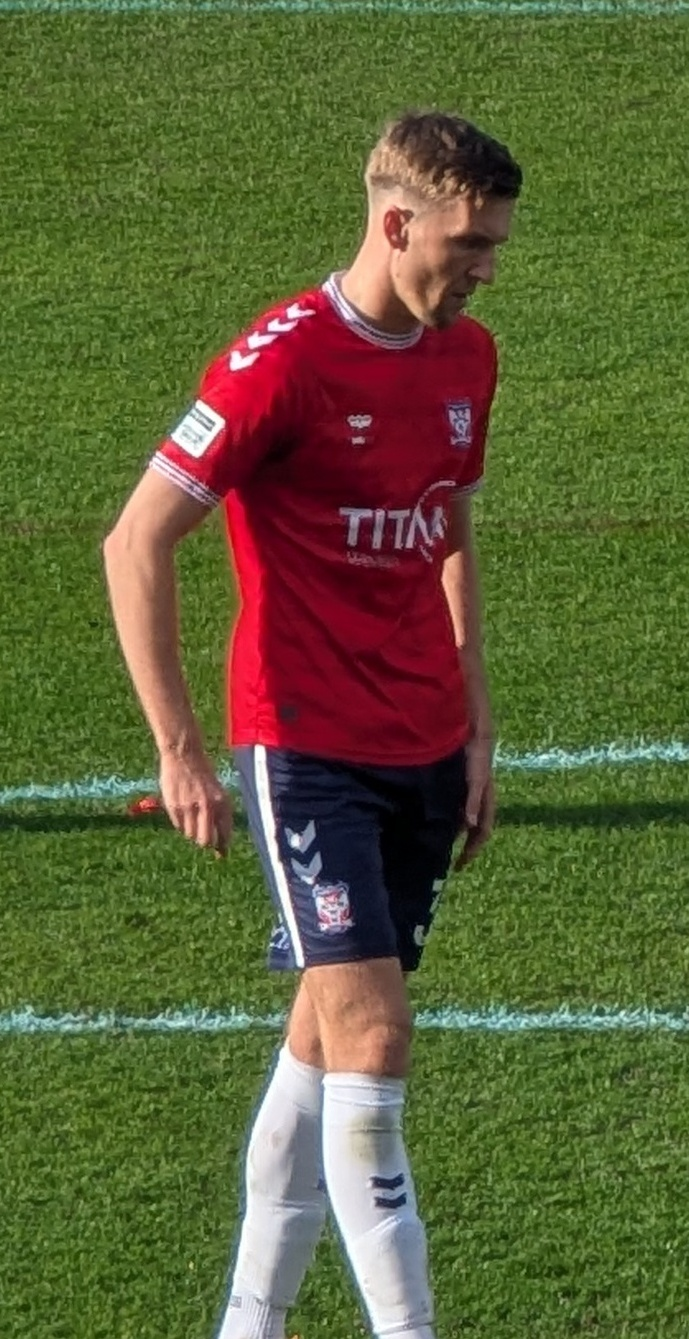
- Kitching in 2026

Personal information
- Full name: Mark Stephen Kitching
- Date of birth: 4 September 1995 (age 31)
- Place of birth: Guisborough, Cleveland, England
- Height: 6 ft 3 in (1.91 m)
- Positions: Left back; left midfielder

Team information
- Current team: York City
- Number: 3

Youth career
- –2013: Middlesbrough

Senior career*
Years	Team	Apps	(Gls)
2013–2017	Middlesbrough	0	(0)
2015–2016	→ York City (loan)	1	(0)
2017	→ Rochdale (loan)	0	(0)
2017–2018	Rochdale	18	(2)
2018–2020	Hartlepool United	78	(3)
2020–2022	Stockport County	49	(2)
2022–2025	Oldham Athletic	113	(5)
2025–	York City	50	(2)
- * Club domestic league appearances and goals as of 12 September 2026

Mark Stephen Kitching (born 4 September 1995) is an English professional footballer who plays as a left-back or left midfielder for EFL League Two club York City. He has played in the English Football League for York City, Oldham Athletic, Rochdale and Stockport County.

Kitching started his career with Middlesbrough and had a loan spell with League Two club York City from 2015 to 2016. He joined Rochdale in 2017, initially on loan, before moving to Hartlepool United in 2018.

== Career ==
=== Middlesbrough ===
Kitching was born in Guisborough, Cleveland. He progressed through the academy at Middlesbrough, the club he grew up supporting. His first involvement with the first team was as an unused substitute in a 1–0 home win over Derby County on 5 April 2014. Kitching signed a two-year professional contract with Middlesbrough in April 2014. He joined League Two club York City on a one-month youth loan on 26 November 2015, and made his debut two days later when starting in a 5–1 home defeat to Accrington Stanley. He lost his place in the team to Femi Ilesanmi, and returned to Middlesbrough in January 2016 without making any further appearances.

=== Rochdale ===
On 27 January 2017, Kitching joined League One club Rochdale on loan until the end of the 2016–17 season. He made his debut a day later as a 12th-minute substitute in a 4–0 home defeat by Huddersfield Town. He signed for Rochdale permanently on a one-and-a-half-year contract on 31 January 2017. He was released by Rochdale at the end of the 2017–18 season.

=== Hartlepool United ===
Kitching signed for National League club Hartlepool United on 3 July 2018 on a contract of undisclosed length.

=== Stockport County ===
Kitching signed for Stockport County on 17 July 2020 after turning down a new contract at Hartlepool United. He spent two full seasons at the club, where he won the National League title the previous season. On 20 October 2022, Kitching departed Stockport having had his contract terminated by mutual consent.

=== Oldham Athletic ===
Kitching joined National League club Oldham Athletic on 31 October 2022. In June 2025, Kitching won the National League playoffs with the club to get promoted to League Two. On 24 June 2025 it was announced Kitching would depart the club upon the expiry of his contract.

=== York City ===
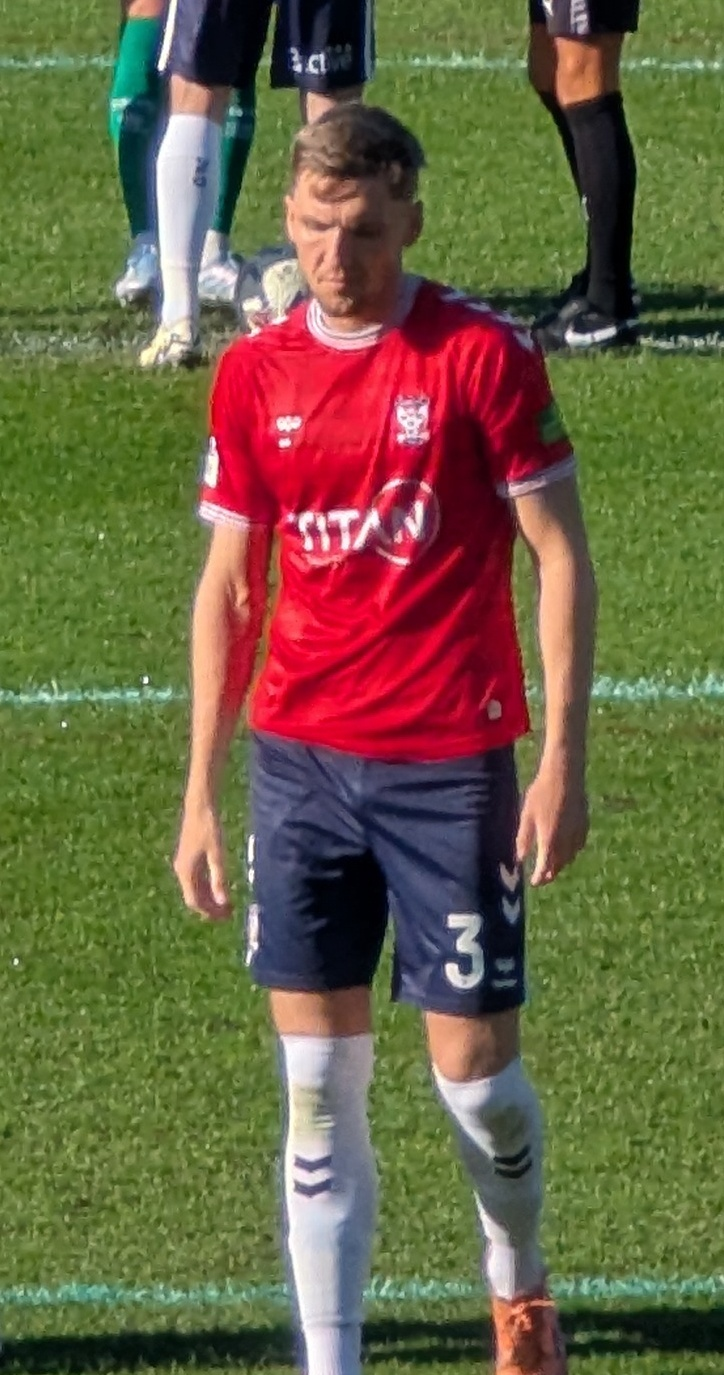
Kitching playing for York City in 2026

On 24 June 2025, Kitching signed for National League club York City.

== Career statistics ==
As of match played 25 April 2026

Appearances and goals by club, season and competition
Club	Season	League			FA Cup		EFL Cup		Other		Total	
Club	Season	Division	Apps	Goals	Apps	Goals	Apps	Goals	Apps	Goals	Apps	Goals
Middlesbrough	2013–14	Championship	0	0	0	0	0	0	0	0	0	0
Middlesbrough	2014–15	Championship	0	0	0	0	0	0	0	0	0	0
Middlesbrough	2015–16	Championship	0	0	0	0	0	0	0	0	0	0
Middlesbrough	2016–17	Premier League	0	0	0	0	0	0	0	0	0	0
Middlesbrough	Total		0	0	0	0	0	0	0	0	0	0
York City (loan)	2015–16	League Two	1	0	0	0	0	0	0	0	1	0
Middlesbrough U23	2016–17	N/A	0	0	0	0	0	0	2 (Note: Appearances in EFL Trophy)	0	2	0
Rochdale	2016–17	League One	5	0	1	0	0	0	0	0	6	0
Rochdale	2017–18	League One	13	2	6	0	1	0	3	0	23	2
Rochdale	Total		18	2	7	0	1	0	3	0	29	2
Hartlepool United	2018–19	National League	40	2	3	0	0	0	2 (Note: Appearance(s) in FA Trophy)	0	45	2
Hartlepool United	2019–20	National League	38	1	5	1	0	0	1	0	44	2
Hartlepool United	Total		78	3	8	1	0	0	3	0	89	4
Stockport County	2020–21	National League	17	2	3	0	0	0	2	0	22	2
Stockport County	2021–22	National League	26	0	4	0	0	0	4	0	34	0
Stockport County	2022–23	League Two	6	0	0	0	1	0	2	0	9	0
Stockport County	Total		49	2	7	0	1	0	8	0	65	2
Oldham Athletic	2022–23	National League	30	2	1	0	0	0	2	0	33	2
Oldham Athletic	2023–24	National League	43	0	2	0	0	0	2	0	47	0
Oldham Athletic	2024–25	National League	40	3	3	0	0	0	4	1	47	4
Oldham Athletic	Total		113	5	6	0	0	0	8	1	127	6
York City	2025–26	National League	44	2	2	1	0	0	1	0	47	3
Career total			303	14	30	2	2	0	25	1	360	17

== Honours ==
Stockport County

- National League: 2021–22

Oldham Athletic

- National League play-offs: 2025

York City

- National League: 2025–26
