= Brendan Moore =

American soccer player (born 1992)

Personal information
- Full name: Brendan Albert Moore
- Date of birth: April 16, 1992 (age 34)
- Place of birth: Elmira, New York, United States
- Height: 6 ft 3 in (1.91 m)
- Position: Goalkeeper

College career
Years	Team	Apps	(Gls)
2010–2014	North Carolina Tar Heels		

Senior career*
Years	Team	Apps	(Gls)
2011	Mississippi Brilla	6	(0)
2012	Orlando City U-23	13	(0)
2015–2016	Fleetwood Town	0	(0)
2016	→ Torquay United (loan)	12	(0)
2016–2017	Torquay United	46	(0)
2017–2019	Rochdale	14	(0)
2019–2020	Atlanta United	0	(0)
2019	→ Atlanta United 2 (loan)	9	(0)
- * Club domestic league appearances and goals as of 6:52, October 20, 2019 (UTC)

Brendan Albert Moore (born April 16, 1992) is an American soccer player. Moore is also a distinguished amateur tennis player. In December 2022, Moore captained his ALTA team to a C-4 Men's division title.

== Youth and college ==
=== Youth and college ===
Moore attended Centennial High School in Georgia, where he help lead the team to the AAAAA state championship match in 2009. Moore played college soccer at University of North Carolina from 2010 to 2014.

== Professional career ==
From 2015 through 2017, Moore spent time with Fleetwood Town and Torquay United in the English league system.

=== Rochdale ===
In July 2017, Moore moved to EFL League One club Rochdale. He made his league debut for the club on August 19, 2017, in a 3–2 away loss to Shrewsbury Town.

=== Atlanta United ===
On January 9, 2019, MLS side Atlanta United announced the signing of Moore as a Discovery Signing.

Following the 2020 season, Moore was released by Atlanta on November 24, 2020.

== Career statistics ==
=== Club ===
As of match played September 2, 2017

Appearances and goals by club, season and competition
Club	Season	League			FA Cup		League Cup		Other		Total	
Club	Season	Division	Apps	Goals	Apps	Goals	Apps	Goals	Apps	Goals	Apps	Goals
Fleetwood Town	2015–16	League One	0	0	0	0	0	0	0	0	0	0
Torquay United (loan)	2015–16	National	12	0	0	0	~	~	0	0	12	0
Torquay United	2016–17	National	46	0	2	0	~	~	1 (Note: Appearance in the FA Trophy)	0	49	0
Rochdale	2017–18	League One	6	0	0	0	1	0	1	0	8	0
Career total			64	0	2	0	1	0	2	0	69	0
