= List of association football clubs in New Zealand =

Association football, also known as football and soccer, is a popular recreational sport in New Zealand. The sport is administered in New Zealand by the governing body New Zealand Football (NZF). This is a list of association football clubs that play in the top leagues in New Zealand and Australia.

== Administration ==
New Zealand is divided up into six regional federations that help in the administration and promotion of the sport in New Zealand:

- Federation One (Northern Region Football) – Northland, Auckland
- Federation Two (WaiBOP Football) – Waikato, Bay of Plenty and King Country
- Federation Three (Central Football) – Gisborne, Hawke's Bay, Taranaki, Manawatū-Whanganui
- Federation Four (Capital Football) – Greater Wellington, including the Kāpiti Coast and Wairarapa
- Federation Five (Mainland Football) – Tasman, Marlborough, Nelson, West Coast, Northern and Central Canterbury
- Federation Six (Southern Football) – South Canterbury, Otago, Southland

== A-League ==
Team	Location	Home ground
Auckland FC	Auckland	Go Media Stadium
Wellington Phoenix	Wellington	Sky Stadium

The Wellington Phoenix is managed under New Zealand Football itself rather than one of the federations. Auckland and Wellington Phoenix are the only professional football clubs in New Zealand, with both of them playing in the Australian A-League.

== OFC Pro League ==
Team	Location
Auckland FC	Auckland
South Island United	Christchurch

== New Zealand National League ==
The New Zealand National League is the top men's football league in the New Zealand league system. Founded in 2021, the New Zealand National League is the successor to the New Zealand Football Championship. The league will be contested by ten teams, with teams qualifying from their regional leagues. Four teams will qualify from the Northern League, three qualify from the Central League, two qualify from the newly formed Southern League and the Wellington Phoenix Reserves are given an automatic spot each year.

The regional leagues runs from March through to September, with varying number of games in each region. The Championship phase runs after the completion of the regional leagues with each team playing each other once, followed by a grand final. Each season, two clubs gain qualification to the OFC Champions League, the continental competition for the Oceania region.

== Regional competition ==
Premier winter club competitions is divided into three regional leagues:

- The Northern League, consisting of teams from Federations One (Northland, Auckland) and Two (Waikato/Bay of Plenty)
- The Central League, consisting of teams from Federations Three (Central North Island) and Four (Greater Wellington)
- The Southern League, consisting of teams from Federation Five and Federation Six
- The Capital Football W-League, is a Women's Football league consisting of teams from Federations Four (Central North Island) and Five (Greater Wellington)

== Alphabetically ==
The divisions are correct for the 2024 season and the levels are stated as per the New Zealand football league system.

=== Key ===
Key to divisional change
New Club
Club was promoted to a higher Level
Club was transferred between divisions at the same Level
Club resigned or was demoted to a lower Level
Club was relegated to a lower Level

=== A ===
Club	League/Division	Lvl	Nickname	Change from 2022 to 2023
AFC Bohemian Celtic	Auckland Sunday Leagues	SUN	Bohs	
Al-Huda	Otago Division 2	5		Promoted from Otago Division 3
Albany United	NRFL Northern Conference	4	Reds	
Auckland City	Northern League	2	Navy Blues	
Auckland United	Northern League	2		

=== B ===
Club	League/Division	Lvl	Nickname	Change from 2022 to 2023
Balclutha	Southland Division 2	5		Promoted from Otago Division 1
Banks Peninsula	Mainland Division 9	13		
Bay Cosmos	Northland Division 4	9		
Bay Olympic	Northern League	2	Olympic	
Beachlands Maraetai	NRFL Northern Conference	4	Beachlands	
Blenheim Valley Sports	Marlborough Division 1	5	Valley	
Birkenhead United	Northern League	2	Birko	
Brooklyn Northern United	Capital 1	4	BNU	
Bream Bay United	Northland Division 1	6		
Bucklands Beach	NRFL Northern Conference	4	Bucklands	
Burnham	Mainland Division 6	10		Relegated from Mainland Division 11
Burwood	Mainland Premier League	3		

=== C ===
Club	League/Division	Lvl	Nickname	Change from 2022 to 2023
Cambridge	NRFL Southern Conference	4	Reds	
Carterton	Wairarapa 1	8		
Cashmere Technical	Southern League	2		
Castlecliff	Whanganui Championship	6		New Club
Central	Marlborough Division 1	5		
Central Brown	Northland Division 2	7		Promoted from Northland Division 4
Central United	NRF League One	5	Central	Relegated from NRFL Northern Conference
Christchurch United	Southern League	2	Rams	
Claudelands Rovers	NRFL Southern Conference	4	Rovers	
Clendon United	NRF Division 5	10		
Clevedon	NRF South Division 9	14		Promoted from NRF South Division 10
Coastal Spirit	Southern League	2		
Colo Boys	Auckland Sunday Leagues	SUN	Stags	

=== D ===
Club	League/Division	Lvl	Nickname	Change from 2022 to 2023
Dannevirke	Manawatu Division 2	7		
Douglas Villa	Capital 1	4		Promoted from Capital 2
Dunedin City Royals	Southern League	2		
Durie Hill	Whanganui Championship	6		
Drury United	NRF Division 4	9		Promoted from NRF Division 5

=== E ===
Club	League/Division	Lvl	Nickname	Change from 2022 to 2023
East Coast Bays	Northern League	2	Bays	Promoted from NRFL Championship
Eastern City	Waikato Division 4	9		New Club
Eastern Suburbs	Northern League	2	Lilywhites	
Ellerslie	NRFL Championship	3	Ponies	
Eltham	Taranaki Division 2	6		
Eskview United	Hawkes Bay Division 2	6		

=== F ===
Club	League/Division	Lvl	Nickname	Change from 2022 to 2023
FC Nelson	Nelson Premier Division 1	5		
FC Twenty 11	Southern League	2		
FC Western	Central Federation League	3		Promoted from Taranaki Premiership
FC Whangarei	Northland Division 1	6		
Featherston United	Wairarapa 1	8		
Feilding United	Horizons Premiership	4		
Fencibles United	NRFL Championship	3		
Ferrymead Bays	Southern League	2	Bays	
Franklin United	NRFL Championship	3		Promoted from NRFL Northern Conference

=== G ===
Club	League/Division	Lvl	Nickname	Change from 2022 to 2023
Geraldine	South Canterbury Division 1	4		Promoted from South Canterbury Division 2
Gisborne Bohemians	Gisborne Eastern 2	5		
Gisborne Thistle	Central Federation League	3	Thistle	
Gisborne United	Gisborne Eastern 1	4		
Glen Eden United	NRF Harbour Division 8	13		New Club
Golden Bay	Nelson Premier Division 1	5		Promoted from Nelson Division 2
Gore Wanderers	Southland Division 1	4		
Grants Braes	Otago Division 1	4		
Green Island	Southern Premier League	3		Relegated from Southern League
Greenhithe	NRF Division 5	10		Promoted from NRF Harbour Division 6
Greytown	Capital 2	5		Promoted from Capital 3

=== H ===
Club	League/Division	Lvl	Nickname	Change from 2022 to 2023
Halswell United	Mainland Premier League	3	Hawks	
Hamilton Wanderers	Northern League	2	Wanderers	
Hastings Hibernian	Hawkes Bay Division 2	6		
Hauraki Plains	Waikato Division 4	9		New Club
Havelock North Wanderers	Central Federation League	3	Wanderers	Promoted from Pacific Premiership
Hāwera	Taranaki Premiership	4		
Hibiscus Coast	NRFL Championship	3	Coast	
High School Old Boys AFC	Mainland Division 4	8		
High School Old Boys SC	Gisborne Division 1	4		Promoted from Gisborne Division 2
Hornby United	Mainland Division 3	7		
Huntly Thistle	Waikato Division 1	6	Thistle	Promoted from Waikato Division 2
Hurunui Rangers	Mainland Division 9	13		

=== I ===
Club	League/Division	Lvl	Nickname	Change from 2022 to 2023
Independiente	Auckland Sunday Leagues	SUN		
Inglewood	Taranaki Premiership	4		Promoted from Taranaki Championship
Internationale	Auckland Sunday Leagues	SUN		
Island Bay United	Central League	2	Sharks	Promoted from Capital Premier

=== K ===
Club	League/Division	Lvl	Nickname	Change from 2022 to 2023
Kaikohe	Northland Division 2	7		
Kaitaia United	Northland Division 1	6		Promoted from Northland Division 2
Kaitake	Taranaki Premiership	4		Promoted from Taranaki Championship
Kapiti Coast United	Horowhenua/Kapiti Division 1	8	KCU	
Kamo	Northland Division 1	6		Promoted from Northland Division 2
Kaponga	Taranaki Championship	5		Promoted from Taranaki Division 1
Katikati	Bay League Division 1A	6		
Kerikeri	Northland Division 1	6		

=== L ===
Club	League/Division	Lvl	Nickname	Change from 2022 to 2023
Levin	Horizons Premiership	4		
Linton	Horizons Championship	5		
Lower Hutt City	Capital Premier	3	Yellows	
Lynn-Avon United	NRF Division 5	10		Promoted from NRF Central Division 6

=== M ===
Club	League/Division	Lvl	Nickname	Change from 2022 to 2023
Madhatters	Northland Division 2	7		Relegated from Northland Division 1
Manakau United	Horowhenua/Kapiti Division 1	8		
Manawatu Plunderers	Manawatu Division 3	8		
Mangawhai	Northland Division 2	7		Relegated from Northland Division 1
Mangere United	NRF League One	5		Promoted from NRF Division 3
Manukau United	NRFL Championship	3		Relegated from Northern League
Manurewa	Northern League	2	Rewa	
Mapua Rangers	Nelson Division 2	6	Rangers	Promoted from Nelson Division 3
Martinborough	Wairarapa 2/3	9/10		
Masterton	Wairarapa 1	8		
Massey University	Manawatu Division 1	6	Massey	
Matamata Swifts	WaiBOP League One	5	Swifts	
Maycenvale United	Pacific Premiership	4		
Melville United	Northern League	2		
Metro	NRFL Championship	3		
Methven	Mainland Division 2	6		
Mid Canterbury United	Mainland Division 1	5		
Miramar Rangers	Central League	2	Rangers	
Morrinsville	Waikato Division 1	6		Promoted from Waikato Division 2
Mosgiel	Southern Premiership	3	Plainsmen	
Motueka	Nelson Premiership Division 1	5		
Moturoa	Taranaki Premiership	4	Reds	
Mount Albert-Ponsonby	NRFL Championship	3		

=== N ===
Club	League/Division	Lvl	Nickname	Change from 2022 to 2023
Naenae SC	Capital 3	6		
Napier City Rovers	Central League	2	Rovers	
Napier Marist	Pacific Premiership	4		
Napier South	Hawkes Bay Division 2	6		
Nelson Suburbs	Southern League	2	Suburbs	
New Plymouth Boys' High School	Taranaki Premiership	4		
New Plymouth Rangers	Central Federation League	3	Rangers	Promoted from Taranaki Premiership
Ngatapa	Gisborne Eastern 2	5		
Ngaruawahia United	NRFL Championship	3	Green Machine	
Ngongotahā Lakes	NRFL Southern Conference	4	Villagers	
Ngunguru	Northland Division 1	6		
Nomads United	Southern League	2	Nomads	
North End	Manawatu Division 1	6		
North Shore United	NRFL Championship	3	Shore	
North Wellington	Central League	2		
Northern	FootballSouth Premier League	3	Northern	
Northern Hearts	FootballSouth Premier League	3	Hearts	
Northern United	WaiBOP League One	5		Promoted from Waikato Division 1
Northern Rovers	NRFL Championship	3	Rovers	
Northern Wairoa	Northland Division 2	7		
Northland	NRFL Northern Conference	4		

=== O ===
Club	League/Division	Lvl	Nickname	Change from 2022 to 2023
Ohope Beach	Bay League 1A	6		New Club
Old Boys	Otago Division 1	4	Reds	Transferred from Southland Division 1
Ōmokoroa	Bay League 2A	7		New Club
Onehunga Sports	NRF South Division 6	11	Sports	Promoted from NRF Central Division 8
Onehunga Mangere United	NRFL Championship	3	OMU	
Onerahi	Northland Division 1	6		
Oratia United	NRFL Northern Conference	4	Tia	
Otago University	FootballSouth Premier League	3	Varsity	
Otaki	Horowhenua/Kapiti Division 1	8		
Otahuhu United	NRF Division 3	8		Promoted from NRF Division 4
Otorohanga	WaiBOP League One	5		
Otumoetai	NRFL Southern Conference	4		
Oxford	Mainland Division 1	5		Promoted from Mainland Division 4

=== P ===
Club	League/Division	Lvl	Nickname	Change from 2022 to 2023
Paekākāriki	Horowhenua/Kapiti Division 1	8		
Pahiatua	Manawatu Division 3	8		
Palmerston North Marist	Central Federation League	3	Marist	
Palmerston North United	Central Federation League	3		
Papakura City	NRF League One	5		
Papamoa	NRFL Southern Conference	4		
Papanui-Redwood	Mainland Division 5	9		
Papatoetoe	NRF League One	5	Reds	
Papatoetoe United	NRF Division 4	9		Promoted from NRF South Division 6
Parklands United	Mainland Premier League	3		
Peringa United	Central Federation League	4		Promoted from Taranaki Premiership
Petone	Central League	2	Settlers	
Picton	Marlborough Division 2	6		Relegated from Marlborough Division 1
Plains Rangers	Bay League Division 2B	8		Relegated from Bay League Division 2
Pleasant Point	South Canterbury Division 1	4		Promoted from South Canterbury Division 2
Porirua City	Wellington 1	8		
Port Hill United	Pacific Premiership	4		
Puhoi	NRF Harbour Division 8	13		New Club
Pukekohe	NRF Division 4	9		
Putaruru Rangers	Waikato Division 3	8	Rangers	Promoted from Waikato Division 4

=== Q ===
Club	League/Division	Lvl	Nickname	Change from 2022 to 2023
Queens Park	FootballSouth Premier League	3	Park	
Queenstown Rovers	FootballSouth Premier League	3	Rovers	

=== R ===
Club	League/Division	Lvl	Nickname	Change from 2022 to 2023
Rangers	Nelson Premier Division 1	5		
Ranui Swanson	NRF Division 5	10		Relegated from NRF League One
Rapa Nui	Auckland Sunday Leagues	SUN		
Red Sox Manawatu	Manawatu Division 1	6		
Richmond Athletic	Nelson Premier Division 1	5		
Rivercity	Whanganui Championship	6	Chiefs	
Roslyn-Wakari	FootballSouth Premier League	3		
RNZ Navy	NRF Division 4	9		

=== S ===
Club	League/Division	Lvl	Nickname	Change from 2022 to 2023
Seatoun	Capital Premier	3	Toon	
Selwyn United	Southern League	2		
Shockers	Gisborne Eastern 1	4		Promoted from Gisborne Eastern 2
South Auckland Rangers	NRF League One	5	Rangers	
Southend United	Southland Division 2	5		Relegated from Southland Division 1
Sperm Whales	Auckland Sunday Football Leagues	SUN	Spunkies	
St Albans Shirley	Mainland Division 2	6		
Stokes Valley	Capital 2	5		
Stop Out	Central League	2		
Stratford	Taranaki Division 2	6		

=== T ===
Club	League/Division	Lvl	Nickname	Change from 2022 to 2023
Tahuna	Nelson Premier Division 1	5		
Takapuna	NRFL Championship	3	Taka	Relegated from Northern League
Takaro	Horizons Premiership	4		
Taradale	Central Federation League	3		
Taupo	NRFL Southern Conference	4		
Tauranga City	Northern League	3	The Blues	Promoted from NRFL Championship
Tawa	Capital Premier	3		
Te Atatu	NRFL Northern Conference	5		Promoted from NRF League One
Te Awamutu	NRFL Southern Conference	4		
Te Kotahitanga	Capital Premier	3		New Club
Te Puke United	WaiBOP League One	6		Promoted from Bay League 1
Temuka United	South Canterbury Division 3	6		Relegated from South Canterbury Division 2
Thames	Waikato Division 2	7		
Tikipunga	Northland Division 1	6		
Thistle FC	Southland Division 1	4	Thistle	
Timaru Boys' High School	South Canterbury Division 1	4		
Timaru City	South Canterbury Division 3	6		
Thistle AFC	South Canterbury Division 1	4	Thistle	
Tokoroa	WaiBOP League One	5		
Trojans	Marlborough Division 1	5		
Tuakau	NRF South Division 5	10		

=== U ===
Club	League/Division	Lvl	Nickname	Change from 2022 to 2023
Uni-Mount Bohemian	NRF League One	5	Uni-Mount	
University of Auckland	Auckland Sunday Football Leagues	SUN		
University of Canterbury	Southern League	2		Promoted from Mainland Premier League
Upper Hutt City	Capital Premier	3		

=== V ===
Club	League/Division	Lvl	Nickname	Change from 2022 to 2023
Victoria University	Capital 1	4	Vic Uni	

=== W ===
Club	League/Division	Lvl	Nickname	Change from 2022 to 2023
Waiariki	Bay League 2B	8		New Club
Waiheke United	NRFL Northern Conference	4	Islanders	Relegated from NRFL Championship
Waihi	Waikato Division 2	7		
Waihopai	Southland Division 1	4		
Waikanae	Horowhenua/Kapiti Division 1	8		
Waikato Unicol	NRFL Southern Conference	4		
Waimakariri United	Mainland Premier League	3	Waimak	
Wainui	Gisborne Eastern 1	4		
Wainuiomata	Capital Premier	3		
Waiariki	Bay League 2B	8		New Club
Wairarapa United	Women's 1	4 (Note: Wairarapa United pulled their men's team out of the Central League before the start of the 2022 season, leaving the women's team as their top senior team.)	Rapa	
Wairoa Athletic	Gisborne Eastern 2	5		Relegated from Gisborne Eastern 1
Waitara	Taranaki Championship	5		Promoted from Taranaki Division 1
Waitemata	NRFL Northern Conference	4		
Waiuku	NRF League One	5	Blue Army	Promoted from NRF Division 5
Wakefield	Nelson Division 2	6		
Wanaka	FootballSouth Premier League	3		
Warkworth	NRF Harbour Division 6	11		Relegated from NRF Division 5b
Waterside Karori	Central League	2	Wharfies	
Wellington Marist	Capital 1	4	Marist	Promoted from Capital 2
Wellington Olympic	Central League	2	Greeks	
Wellington Phoenix Reserves	Central League	2	Nix	
Wellington United	Capital 3	6	Diamonds	
West Auckland	NRF League One	5		Relegated from NRFL Northern Conference
West Coast Rangers	Northern League	3	Rangers	
West End	South Canterbury Division 1	4		
West Hamilton United	WaiBOP League One	5		
Western	Mainland Premier League	3	Dub	
Western Rangers	Pacific Premiership	4		
Western Rovers FC	Southland Division 3	6		
Western Springs	Northern League	2	Springs	
Western Suburbs	Central League	2	Wests	
Whakatane Town	Bay League Division 1A	6		
Whanganui Athletic	Central Federation League	3		Relegated from Central League
Wanganui City	Horizons Premiership	4		
Wanganui Marist	Whanganui Championship	6		
Winton	Southland Division 2	5		Relegated from Southland Division 1
Woodleigh	Taranaki Championship	5		
Woodville	Manawatu Division 3	8		New Club
Wyndham Town	Southland Division 3	6		Relegated from Southland Division 2

=== Z ===
Club	League/Division	Lvl	Nickname	Change from 2022 to 2023
Zamantix Rovers	Auckland Sunday Football Leagues	SUN		

=== Clubs in system last season ===
Club	2022 League/Division	Lvl	Nickname
Horowhenua Coastal	Capital 1	4	
Kawerau	Bay League Division 1	6	
Marewa United	Hawkes Bay Division 3	6	
Paihia	Northland Division 2	7	
Te Anau	Southland Division 1	4	

== See also ==
- Association football in New Zealand
- List of football clubs in Cook Islands
- List of association football clubs in Niue
- List of association football clubs in Tokelau
- List of Australian rules football clubs in New Zealand
- List of baseball teams in New Zealand
- List of basketball teams in New Zealand
- List of cricket clubs in New Zealand
- List of rowing clubs in New Zealand
- List of rugby league clubs in New Zealand
- List of rugby union clubs in New Zealand
- List of yacht clubs in New Zealand
