= 2020 Women's Premiership (New Zealand) =

ISPS Handa Women's Premiership
- Season: 2020
- Champions: Canterbury United Pride
- Matches: 21
- Goals: 79 (3.76 per match)
- Top goalscorer: Rina Hirano and Kaley Ward (6)
- Biggest home win: Canterbury 6-0 Central (21 November 2020)
- Biggest away win: Capital 0-4 Canterbury (5 December 2020)
- Highest scoring: WaiBOP 4-4 Auckland (13 December 2020)
- All statistics correct as of 20 December 2020.

The 2020 Women's Premiership (currently known as the ISPS Handa Women's Premiership for sponsorship reasons) was the eighteenth season of the league, New Zealand's top level women's football league since its establishment in 2002. Seven teams again were involved in the season representing the different regions in New Zealand. The league after consultation and feedback from stakeholders, was reverted to a single round-robin format, with the two highest-placed sides progressing to a one-off grand final. Canterbury United Pride was again the team to beat, as they were looking at a threepeat, having played in every final since 2013, won five out of seven of those finals, including the last two years.

After an unbeaten regular season, Canterbury United Pride capped it off by completing the threepeat, beating 2nd place Capital Football 4–0 in the final.

== Teams ==
Locations of the 2020 National Women's League Teams

Team	Location	Ground	Coach
Northern Lights	North Shore	Allen Hill Stadium	Ben Bate
Auckland Football	Auckland	McLennan Park	Aaron McFarland
WaiBOP	Cambridge	John Kerkhof Park	Nico Girard and Tracy Wrigley
Central Football	Palmerston North	Massey Uni	Barry Scullion
Capital Football	Lower Hutt	Petone Memorial Park	Maia Vink
Canterbury United Pride	Christchurch	English Park	Alana Gunn
Southern United	Dunedin	Logan Park	Ignacio Sande

== Regular season ==
=== League table ===
Pos	Team	Pld	W	D	L	GF	GA	GD	Pts	Qualification
1	Canterbury United Pride (C)	6	6	0	0	23	3	+20	18	Qualification to the Final
2	Capital	6	4	1	1	11	5	+6	13	Qualification to the Final
3	Northern Lights	6	3	1	2	13	6	+7	10	
4	Southern United	6	2	0	4	6	18	−12	6	
5	WaiBOP	6	1	2	3	11	14	−3	5	
6	Auckland (Note: Auckland Football forfeited three matches (losing 9 points) for fielding an ineligible player in their Round 1, 2 and 3 games against Central Football, Canterbury United Pride and Capital Football and the results recorded as 3–0 wins for the opposition.)	6	1	1	4	8	17	−9	4	
7	Central Football	6	1	1	4	7	16	−9	4	

Source: NZ Football
Rules for classification: 1) points; 2) goal difference; 3) number of goals scored.
(C) Champions

=== Positions by round ===
Team ╲ Round	1	2	3	4	5	6	7
Auckland Football	1	1	1	1	1	6*	6
Canterbury United Pride	2	3	2	2	3	1	1
Capital Football	3	2	3	4	2	2	2
Central Football	7	6	6	6	6	5	7
Northern Lights	3	5	4	3	4	3	3
Southern United	6	7	7	7	7	7	4
WaiBOP	5	4	5	5	5	4	5

Qualification to Final

Source: NZ Football
- Auckland Football docked 9 points for fielding an ineligible player in their Round 1, 2 and 3 games against Central Football, Canterbury United Pride and Capital Football and the results recorded as 3–0 wins for the opposition.

=== Fixtures and results ===
New Zealand women's football league matches will take place from 31 October to 20 December with the draw reverting to a single-round robin competition with the top two teams progressing to the one-off final.

On the 11 December New Zealand Football announced Auckland Football had been docked 9 points for fielding an ineligible player in three of their ISPS Handa Women's Premiership games. The results from Round 1, 2 and 3 against Central Football, Canterbury United Pride and Capital Football were forfeited and results recorded as 3–0 wins for the opposition.

==== Round 1 ====
31 October 2020	Southern United	1–4	Canterbury United Pride	Logan Park, Dunedin
11:30	Murrell 90+1'	Report	Roome 21' (o.g.); Wall 61'; Nicholson 71', 83'	Referee: Lindsey Robinson

1 November 2020	Northern Lights	1–1	Capital	McFetridge Park, Auckland
13:00	Knott 41'	Report	Ward 89'	Referee: Sarah Jones

1 November 2020	Auckland Football	0–3*	Central Football	Riverhills Park, Auckland
14:00	Hirano 4', 21'; Takeda 11'; Berrier 12'; Anton 89'; Satchell 40'; Collins 45+2'; Dewell 62'; Russ 90+2'	Report	Furnell 90+1'	Referee: Eric Yu

Bye: WaiBOP
*Auckland Football beat Central Football 9–1 however it was ruled by NZ Football that they had fielded an ineligible player so forfeited the result. This meant the win was awarded as a 3–0 result to Central

==== Round 2 ====
7 November 2020	Central Football	2–2	WaiBOP	Massey University, Palmerston North
12:00	Lancaster 9'; Boxall 41'	Report	Wisnewski 30'; Brown 42'	Referee: Sarah Jones

7 November 2020	Capital Football	5–0	Southern United	Petone Memorial Park, Lower Hutt
13:00	Robertson 33'; Ward 38', 76', 80' (pen.); Brown 87'	Report		Referee: Simon Morris

7 November 2020	Canterbury United Pride	3–0*	Auckland Football	English Park, Christchurch
13:00	Lake 65' (pen.)	Report	O'Brien 6'; Cleverley 19', 21'; Hirano 37'	Referee: Lindsey Robinson

Bye: Northern Lights
*Auckland Football beat Canterbury United Pride 4–1 however it was ruled by NZ Football that they had fielded an ineligible player so forfeited the result. This meant the win was awarded as a 3–0 result to Canterbury

==== Round 3 ====
15 November 2020	Southern United	0–3	Northern Lights	Logan Park, Dunedin
12:00		Report	Pritchard 58', 89'; Savage 84'	Referee: Caleb Marsh

15 November 2020	WaiBOP	2–4	Canterbury United Pride	John Kerkhof Park, Cambridge
12:00	Foster 2'; Elliott 56'	Report	Hepburn 25'; Nicholson 41'; Rennie 47'; Lake 90'	Referee: Robbie Maris

15 November 2020	Auckland Football	0–3*	Capital Football	Riverhills Park, Auckland
14:00	O’Brien 14'; Philpot 34'; Takeda 38'	Report	Ward 90+3'	Referee: Lindsey Robinson

Bye: Central Football
*Auckland Football beat Capital Football 3–1 however it was ruled by NZ Football that they had fielded an ineligible player so forfeited the result. This meant the win was awarded as a 3–0 result to Capital

==== Round 4 ====
21 November 2020	Capital Football	1–0	WaiBOP	Petone Memorial Park, Lower Hutt
11:30	Ward 74'	Report		Referee: Lindsey Robinson

21 November 2020	Canterbury United Pride	6–0	Central Football	English Park, Christchurch
14:00	Rennie 40', 43', 59'; Lake 84' (pen.); Wall 85'; Clarke 90+2'	Report		Referee: Sarah Jones

22 November 2020	Northern Lights	4–1	Auckland Football	McFetridge Park, Auckland
13:00	Maynard 16'; Knott 27' (pen.); Savage 70' (pen.); Mittendorff 88'	Report	O’Brien 7'	Referee: Eric Yu

Bye: Southern United

==== Round 5 ====
29 November 2020	Central Football	0–1	Capital Football	Massey University, Palmerston North
12:00		Report	Errington 11'	Referee: Andrew Turner

29 November 2020	Auckland Football	3–0	Southern United	Riverhills Park, Auckland
12:30	Hirano 36', 43'; Cunningham-Lee 51'	Report		Referee: Sarah Jones

29 November 2020	WaiBOP	2–1	Northern Lights	John Kerkhof Park, Cambridge
14:00	Brown 45'; Cawte 47'	Report	Green 51'	Referee: Robbie Maris

Bye: Canterbury United Pride

==== Round 6 ====
5 December 2020	Capital Football	0–4	Canterbury United Pride	Petone Memorial Park, Lower Hutt
11:00		Report	Nicholson 15'; Lake 26'; Whinham 44'; Rennie 46'	Referee: Harrison Cook

6 December 2020	Southern United	2–1	WaiBOP	Logan Park, Dunedin
11:00	Hislop 14', 54'	Report	Bacon 24' (o.g.)	Referee: Caleb Marsh

6 December 2020	Northern Lights	4–0	Central Football	McFetridge Park, Auckland
13:00	Maynard 33', 90+4'; Stratford 43'; Tawharu 90+3'	Report		Referee: Lindsey Robinson

Bye: Auckland Football

==== Round 7 ====
13 December 2020	Central Football	2–3	Southern United	Massey University, Palmerston North
12:00	Boxall 45+11'; Jensen 56'		Bacon 45+9'; Hislop 58'; Fraser 68'	Referee: Max Lauridsen

13 December 2020	Canterbury United Pride	2–0	Northern Lights	English Park, Christchurch
13:00	Bray 79'; Longo 86'			Referee: Sarah Jones

13 December 2020	WaiBOP	4–4	Auckland Football	John Kerkhof Park, Cambridge
14:00	Wisnewski 18'; Foster 81'; Elliott 88'; Neems 90+4'		Cleverley 35'; O'Brien 42', 61'; Hirano 57'	Referee: Robbie Maris

Bye: Capital Football

== Final ==
20 December 2020
14:00

Canterbury United Pride	4–0	Capital Football
Rennie 53', 71'; Nicholson 79'; Dominikovich 85'	Report

English Park, Christchurch
Referee: Sarah Jones

== Statistics ==
As of 15 December 2020

=== Top scorers ===
Rank	Player	Club	Goals
1	Rina Hirano	Auckland Football	6
1	Kaley Ward	Capital Football	6
3	Tayla O'Brien	Auckland Football	5
3	Gabi Rennie	Canterbury United Pride	5
5	Rebecca Lake	Canterbury United Pride	4
5	Britney-Lee Nicholson	Canterbury United Pride	4
7	Daisy Cleverley	Auckland Football	3
7	Amy Hislop	Southern United	3
7	Arabella Maynard	Northern Lights	3
10	Mikaela Boxall	Central Football	2
10	Kelli Brown	WaiBOP	2
10	Chelsea Elliott	WaiBOP	2
10	Michaela Foster	WaiBOP	2
10	Chloe Knott	Northern Lights	2
10	Ava Pritchard	Northern Lights	2
10	Liz Savage	Northern Lights	2
10	Arisa Takeda	Auckland Football	2
10	Lara Wall	Canterbury United Pride	2
10	Grace Wisnewski	WaiBOP	2

=== Hat-tricks ===
Player	For	Against	Result	Date	Ref
Kaley Ward	Capital Football	Southern United	5–0	7 November 2020	
Gabi Rennie	Canterbury United Pride	Central Football	6–0	22 November 2020	

=== Own goals ===
Player	Club	Against	Round
Tahlia Roome	Southern United	Canterbury United Pride	1
Renee Bacon	Southern United	WaiBOP	6
