= 2018 FA Cup =

2018 FA Cup may refer to:

- 2017–18 FA Cup
  - 2018 FA Cup final
- 2017–18 FA Women's Cup
  - 2018 FA Women's Cup final
- 2018–19 FA Cup
- 2018–19 Women's FA Cup
