= Nicole Stratford =

New Zealand footballer

Personal information
- Full name: Nicole Ellen Stratford
- Date of birth: 1 February 1989 (age 37)
- Place of birth: New Zealand
- Height: 1.77 m (5 ft 10 in)
- Position: Defender

Team information
- Current team: Northern Lights

Senior career*
Years	Team	Apps	(Gls)
–2019	Glenfield Rovers		
2019	Carl Zeiss Jena (Note: Known during the 2019-20 season as FF USV Jena.)	4	(0)
2020-	Northern Lights		

International career^{‡}
2008	New Zealand U20		
2019–	New Zealand	2	(0)
- * Club domestic league appearances and goals as of 15:46, 27 December 2019 (UTC) ‡ National team caps and goals as of 15:46, 27 December 2019 (UTC)

Nicole Ellen Stratford (born 1 February 1989) is a New Zealand association footballer who plays as a defender for Northern Lights and the New Zealand women's national team.

== Career ==
Stratford was a member of the New Zealand under-20 national team which participated at the 2008 FIFA U-20 Women's World Cup in Chile.

In June 2019, Stratford received her first call-up to the New Zealand women's national team for the 2019 FIFA Women's World Cup in France, replacing the injured Meikayla Moore. Though unused in the World Cup, she made her international debut on 7 November 2019 against China in the 2019 Yongchuan International Tournament, which finished as a 0–2 loss. She made her second appearance three days later against Canada.

In 2019, Stratford joined German club USV Jena of the Frauen-Bundesliga on a one-year contract.

== Personal life ==
Stratford worked as a police officer in Auckland.

== Career statistics ==
=== International ===
As of 10 November 2019

New Zealand
Year	Apps	Goals
2019	2	0
Total	2	0
