= 2018 FA Cup final =

English association football match

2018 FA Cup Final
- The match was played at Wembley Stadium.
- Event: 2017–18 FA Cup
Chelsea	Manchester United
1	0
- Date: 19 May 2018
- Venue: Wembley Stadium, London
- Man of the Match: Antonio Rüdiger (Chelsea)
- Referee: Michael Oliver (Northumberland)
- Attendance: 87,647
- Weather: Sunny

The 2018 FA Cup final was an association football match between Manchester United and Chelsea on 19 May 2018 at Wembley Stadium in London, England. It was the 137th FA Cup final overall and was the showpiece match of English football's primary cup competition, the Football Association Challenge Cup (FA Cup), organised by the Football Association (FA). It was the second successive final for Chelsea following their defeat by Arsenal the previous year. The teams had met twice before in the FA Cup Final, winning one each between them. The first was in 1994, which Manchester United won 4–0, and most recently in 2007, when Chelsea – then managed by the incumbent Manchester United boss José Mourinho – won 1–0 after extra time.

Michael Oliver refereed the match which was notable for being the first FA Cup Final to use the video assistant referee (VAR) system. Prince William, Duke of Cambridge, and President of the FA, was absent as he was attending his brother's wedding. The trophy was instead presented by Jackie Wilkins, the widow of former Manchester United and Chelsea player Ray Wilkins, who died in April 2018.

The match was played in sunny conditions in front of a Wembley crowd of 87,647. After a relatively even start to the match, on 21 minutes, Chelsea's Eden Hazard was brought down in the Manchester United box and Oliver awarded a penalty. Hazard scored from the spot to make it 1–0 to Chelsea, a lead they maintained to half time. Manchester United dominated the second half, and saw a 63rd-minute goal from Alexis Sánchez ruled out for offside after being referred to VAR. The match ended 1–0 to Chelsea who won the FA Cup for the eighth time.

As winners, Chelsea qualified for the group stage of the 2018–19 UEFA Europa League, although they had qualified for that phase already via their league position. Chelsea also earned the right to play 2017–18 Premier League champions Manchester City for the 2018 FA Community Shield.

== Route to the final ==
=== Chelsea ===
Round	Opposition	Score
3rd Replay	Norwich City (A); Norwich City (H)	0–0; 1–1 (a.e.t.) (5–3 p)
4th	Newcastle United (H)	3–0
5th	Hull City (H)	4–0
QF	Leicester City (A)	2–1 (a.e.t.)
SF	Southampton (N)	2–0
Key: (H) = Home venue; (A) = Away venue; (N) = Neutral venue

Chelsea as a Premier League team entered the FA Cup in the third round, and were drawn against Championship club Norwich City on 7 January at Carrow Road. Chelsea made nine changes to their starting eleven from their previous league match against Arsenal but still dominated the match, which ended goalless. The replay was held 11 days later and was a 1–1 draw with goals from Michy Batshuayi in the 55th minute and Jamal Lewis in the 90th minute. The match went into extra time, during which Chelsea were reduced to nine men when both Pedro and Álvaro Morata were dismissed, each for two yellow cards. With no further goals, the match went to a penalty shootout that Chelsea won 5–3 after their goalkeeper Willy Caballero saved Nélson Oliveira's spot kick. The match was also notable for what the BBC reporter Emlyn Begley described as the "first video refereeing controversy" in English football when, after deliberation with VAR, Willian was booked for diving when he was brought down by Timm Klose in the Norwich penalty area; Alan Shearer described the decision as a "shambles". In the fourth round, Chelsea met Premier League opposition Newcastle United at Stamford Bridge, and won 3–0 with two goals from Batshuayi and one from Marcos Alonso.

In the fifth round, Chelsea faced Hull City, another Championship team, at home. Chelsea were dominant, scoring four times in the first half with goals from Willian (2), Pedro and Olivier Giroud, winning the game 4–0. In the quarter-finals, they visited the King Power Stadium to face fellow Premier League opponents Leicester City, where a goal for Chelsea from Morata and a Leicester equaliser from Jamie Vardy took the game to extra time. Substitute Pedro came off the bench and scored the winning goal to take Chelsea to the semi-final. There, they played Premier League opposition in Southampton at Wembley, and goals from strikers Giroud and Morata saw Chelsea win 2–0, and progress to the FA Cup Final for the second successive season.

=== Manchester United ===
Round	Opposition	Score
3rd	Derby County (H)	2–0
4th	Yeovil Town (A)	4–0
5th	Huddersfield Town (A)	2–0
QF	Brighton & Hove Albion (H)	2–0
SF	Tottenham Hotspur (N) (Note: Although Tottenham Hotspur played their home games at Wembley in 2017–18, it was designated as a neutral venue for the semi-final.)	2–1
Key: (H) = Home venue; (A) = Away venue; (N) = Neutral venue

Like Chelsea, Manchester United entered the cup in the third round because of their Premier League status. They were drawn at home against Championship side Derby County. Despite making five changes to the starting line-up from their previous league match, the Manchester United manager José Mourinho fielded a strong side, including Juan Mata, Paul Pogba, Marcus Rashford and Henrikh Mkhitaryan. United dominated the game and won 2–0 with late goals from Jesse Lingard and substitute Romelu Lukaku. Their fourth round opponents were League Two club Yeovil Town, the lowest ranked team remaining in the competition. Mourinho made ten changes for the match, played at Huish Park, which ended in a 4–0 victory for United with goals from Rashford, Ander Herrera, Lingard and Lukaku.

In the fifth round, Manchester United were drawn against fellow Premier League side Huddersfield Town away at Kirklees Stadium. Although Mata had a goal ruled out following a controversial VAR review, Lukaku scored in each half to secure a 2–0 win. In the quarter-finals, they played Premier League Brighton & Hove Albion at Old Trafford. Lukaku scored in the 37th minute and with Brighton's Jürgen Locadia missing four chances to equalise, a late goal from Nemanja Matić, the United midfielder, secured his side 2–0 victory. In the semi-final at Wembley Stadium, Manchester United faced fellow Premier League club Tottenham Hotspur, who took an early lead through Dele Alli. Alexis Sánchez equalised midway through the first half with a header from Pogba's cross past the Tottenham goalkeeper Michel Vorm. Herrera then put United ahead in the second half and his team held on for the 2–1 win and progression to the final.

== Match ==
=== Background ===
The 2018 final was the last match of the 2017–18 FA Cup and the 137th final of the FA Cup, the world's oldest football cup competition. This was Chelsea's thirteenth FA Cup final, having last progressed to the final the previous season where they lost 2–1 to Arsenal. Chelsea had won the cup on seven occasions, the most recent being in the 2012 FA Cup Final where they defeated Liverpool 2–1. Manchester United had featured in nineteen finals prior to 2018: their most recent appearance was in the 2016 final when they needed extra time to beat Crystal Palace 2–1. The 2018 final was the third to see Manchester United and Chelsea face one another: United won the 1994 FA Cup Final 4–0 while Chelsea were 1–0 winners in the 2007 final. In the two meetings between the clubs during the 2017–18 Premier League, Chelsea won 1–0 at Stamford Bridge in November 2017 while Manchester United won 2–1 at Old Trafford the following February. The season ended with Manchester United in second place, and Chelsea fifth, eleven points behind.

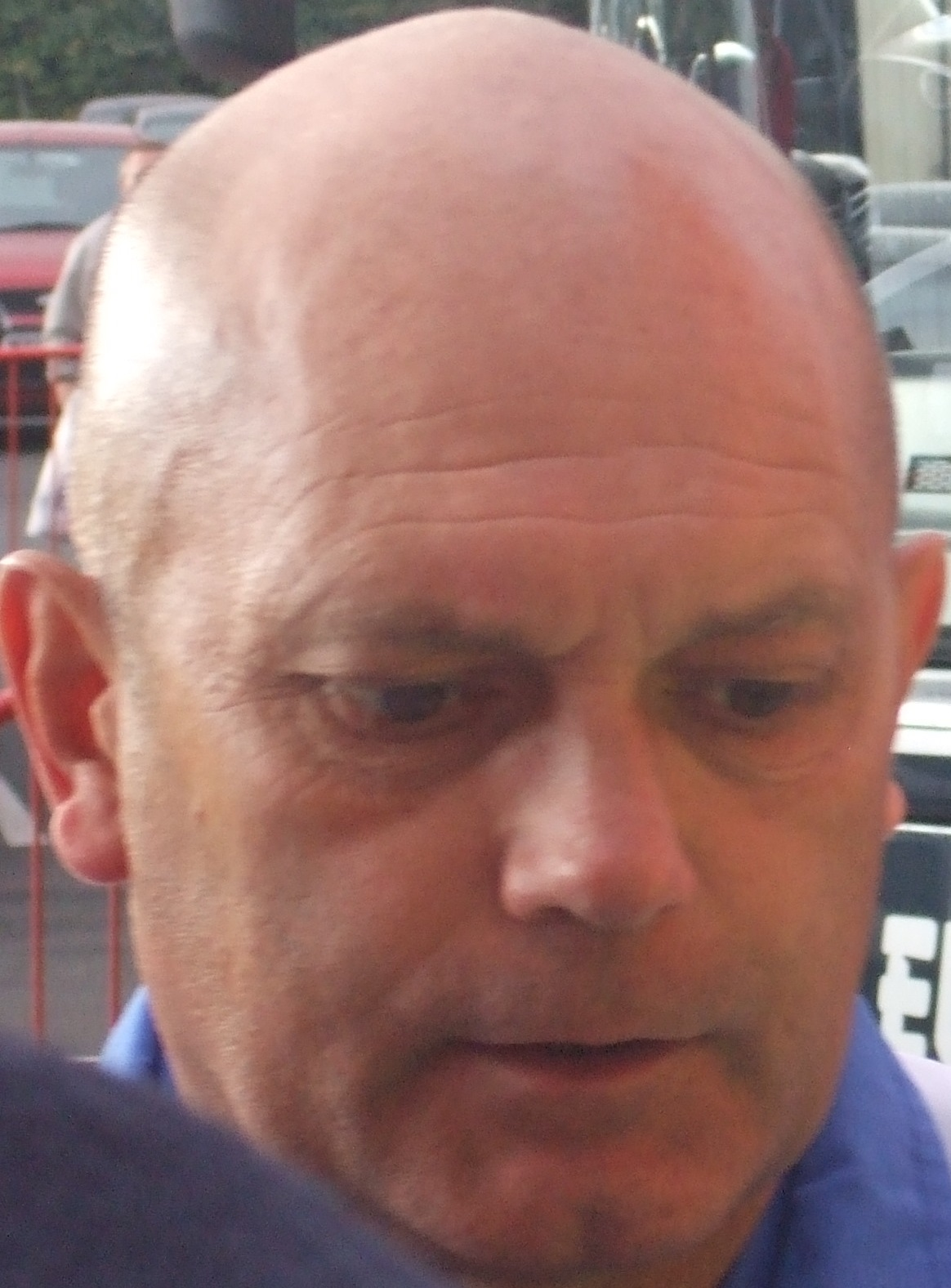
Ray Wilkins (pictured in 2008), who had played for both Chelsea and Manchester United. He had FA Cup success with both teams, as a player for United and then a coach for Chelsea.

Tributes for former Chelsea and Manchester United midfielder Ray Wilkins, who died on 4 April, were held before the match on the hoardings and the screens in the stadium, as well as a feature in the matchday programme. Wilkins won the FA Cup with both sides; in the 1983 final for United, (Note: Manchester United won the 1983 FA Cup Final after a replay; Wilkins scored in the first match.) and three times as assistant manager of Chelsea – in the 2000, 2009 and 2010 finals. The traditional performance of the hymn, "Abide with Me" was performed by the choir of the Royal Air Force and 14 individual fans of 14 different clubs with a flypast by three Royal Air Force Typhoons. The national anthem, "God Save the Queen", was sung by soprano Emily Haig who also performed it at the 2018 FA Women's Cup Final.

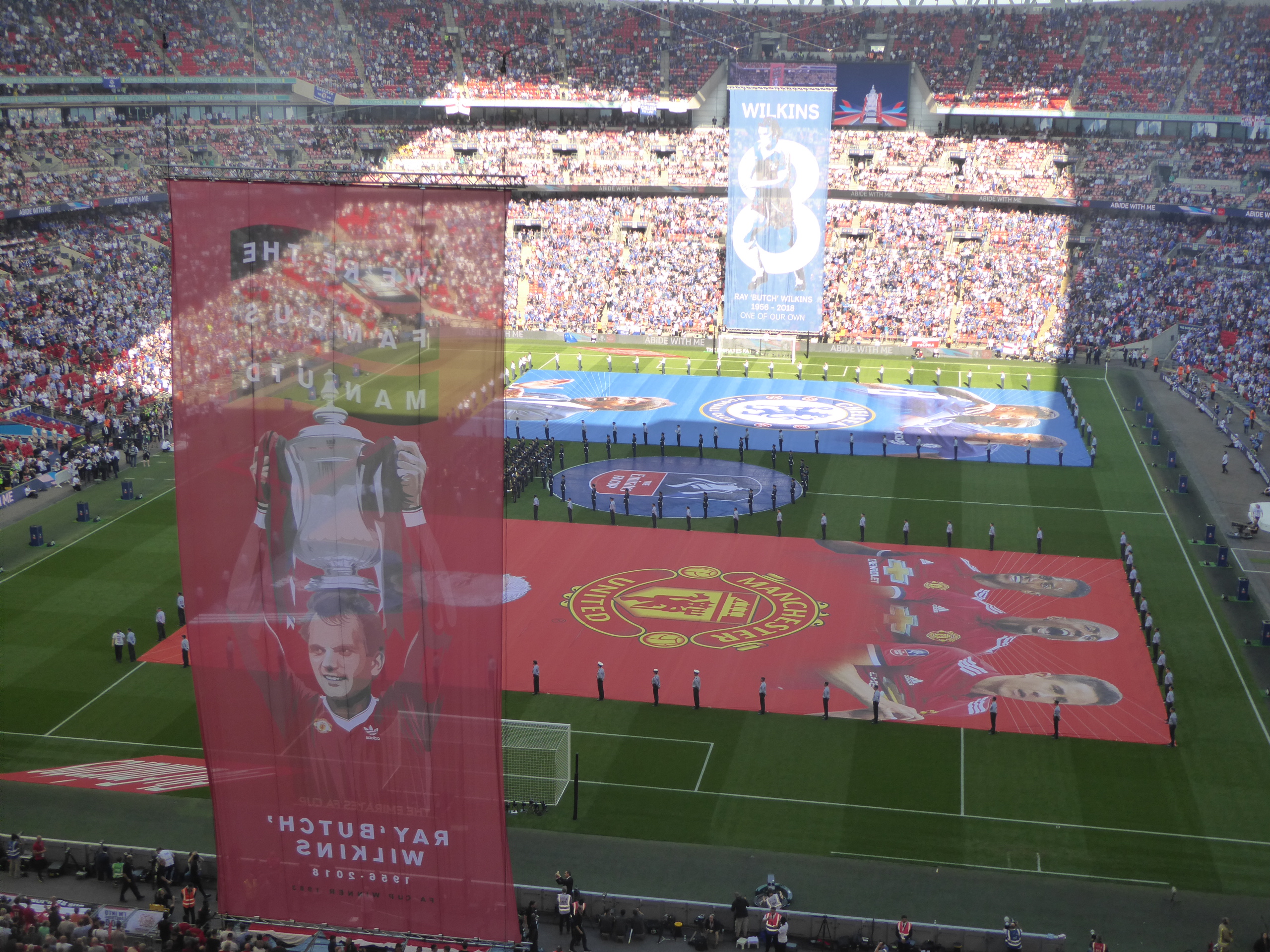
The opening ceremony of the final

The referee for the match was 33-year-old Michael Oliver from Northumberland. He previously officiated when these two sides met in the previous season's quarter-final, in which he sent off Manchester United's Herrera. Oliver became the youngest FA Cup final referee since the 1914 FA Cup Final between Burnley and Liverpool which was officiated by the 32-year-old Herbert Bamlett. Oliver's assistants were Ian Hussin from Liverpool and Lee Betts from Norfolk. The fourth official was Lee Mason of Lancashire, and the fifth official was Constantine Hatzidakis from Kent. For the first time in the final, there was a VAR, Neil Swarbrick of Lancashire. His assistant was Mick McDonough, also of Northumberland. The ball for the match was an FA Cup-branded variant of the Nike Ordem V, and featured the names of 137 players who had scored goals during the 2017–18 FA Cup season, in every round from the extra preliminary round through to the semi-finals.

Mourinho had made nine changes to his starting line-up for the final Premier League match against Watford the previous weekend. Of that eleven, just three were retained for the FA Cup final: Ashley Young, Rashford and Sánchez. Lukaku had also recovered from an ankle injury sustained in April to be selected amongst the substitutes. Sánchez and Giroud became the first players to appear in consecutive FA Cup finals but for different clubs since Brian Talbot accomplished the feat representing Ipswich Town in the 1978 final and Arsenal the following year. The Chelsea manager Antonio Conte made three changes from the team which lost in the league match against Newcastle United 3–0: Andreas Christensen, Emerson and Ross Barkley were dropped for Antonio Rüdiger, Alonso and Cesc Fàbregas. Speculation had surrounded Conte's position as Chelsea manager for several months. He confirmed that his future with the club would be clarified after the FA Cup Final.

=== First half ===
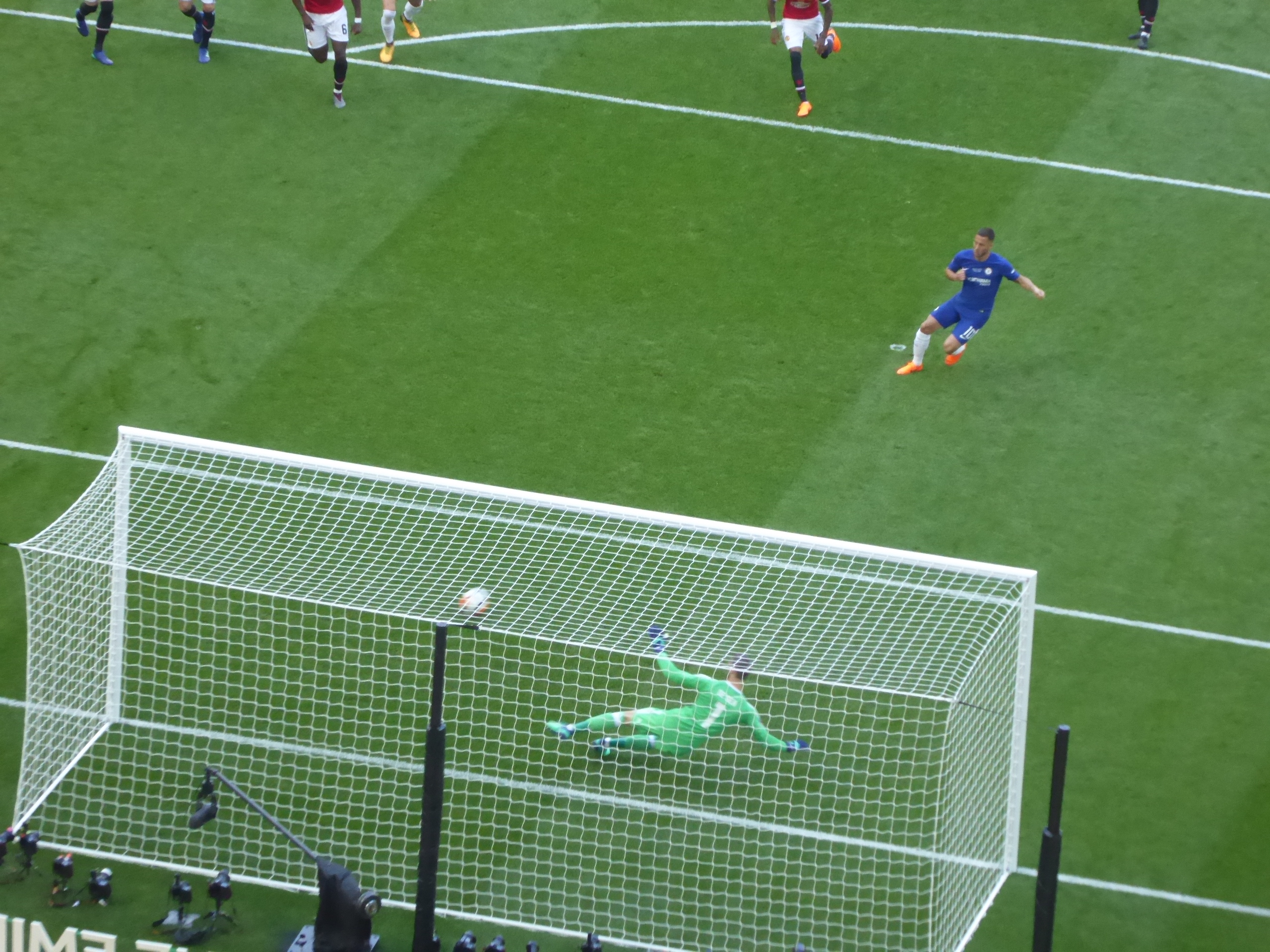
Hazard's first half penalty was the only goal of the game

The match, played in sunny conditions in front of a crowd of 87,647, was kicked off by Manchester United just after 5:15 p.m. Two minutes into the game, Alonso was fouled by Herrera, but the resulting free kick from Fàbregas went straight to the Manchester United goalkeeper David de Gea. Six minutes later, Lingard was brought down by the Chelsea midfielder N'Golo Kanté who conceded a free kick. From the set piece, Young's cross was cleared by Gary Cahill but a mistake from Phil Jones allowed Eden Hazard an opportunity: his shot was saved by the outstretched leg of De Gea. In the fourteenth minute, Chelsea's Tiémoué Bakayoko fell in the United penalty area after contact with Matić, but Oliver decided no foul had been made. Two minutes later, Sánchez also made an unsuccessful claim for a penalty after contact with both Victor Moses and César Azpilicueta sent him to the ground in the Chelsea box. After 21 minutes, Hazard received a pass from Fàbregas and made a run into Manchester United's box, where he was fouled by Jones with a sliding tackle, who received the first yellow card of the game. Oliver awarded a penalty which Hazard himself took, sending the ball low to the right past United goalkeeper De Gea to make it 1–0 to Chelsea. It was the first penalty scored outside a shootout in the FA Cup Final since Ruud van Nistelrooy scored for Manchester United in the 2004 final.

In the 26th minute, Pogba was fouled, allowing Sánchez to send a free kick toward Herrera. His misplaced shot ended back with Sánchez whose cross for Pogba was deflected out by Rüdiger: the resulting corner came to nothing. Pogba then shot wide of Thibaut Courtois' goal before a Sánchez strike from 25 yards (23 m) went off-target. On 35 minutes, Sánchez fouled Bakayoko on the edge of the United area, but the resulting free kick from Fàbregas struck the wall and was cleared. Three minutes later, Pogba won a corner from which Sánchez tried to score directly, but Fàbregas cleared at the near post. Chris Smalling then conceded a corner from another Chelsea free kick: Fàbregas' ball was punched away by De Gea. A minute before half time, Young was fouled by Moses. The free kick resulted in a corner for United, from which Young's cross was headed past Chelsea's right-hand goalpost by Jones. Rashford then missed a chance and the half ended 1–0 to Chelsea.

=== Second half ===
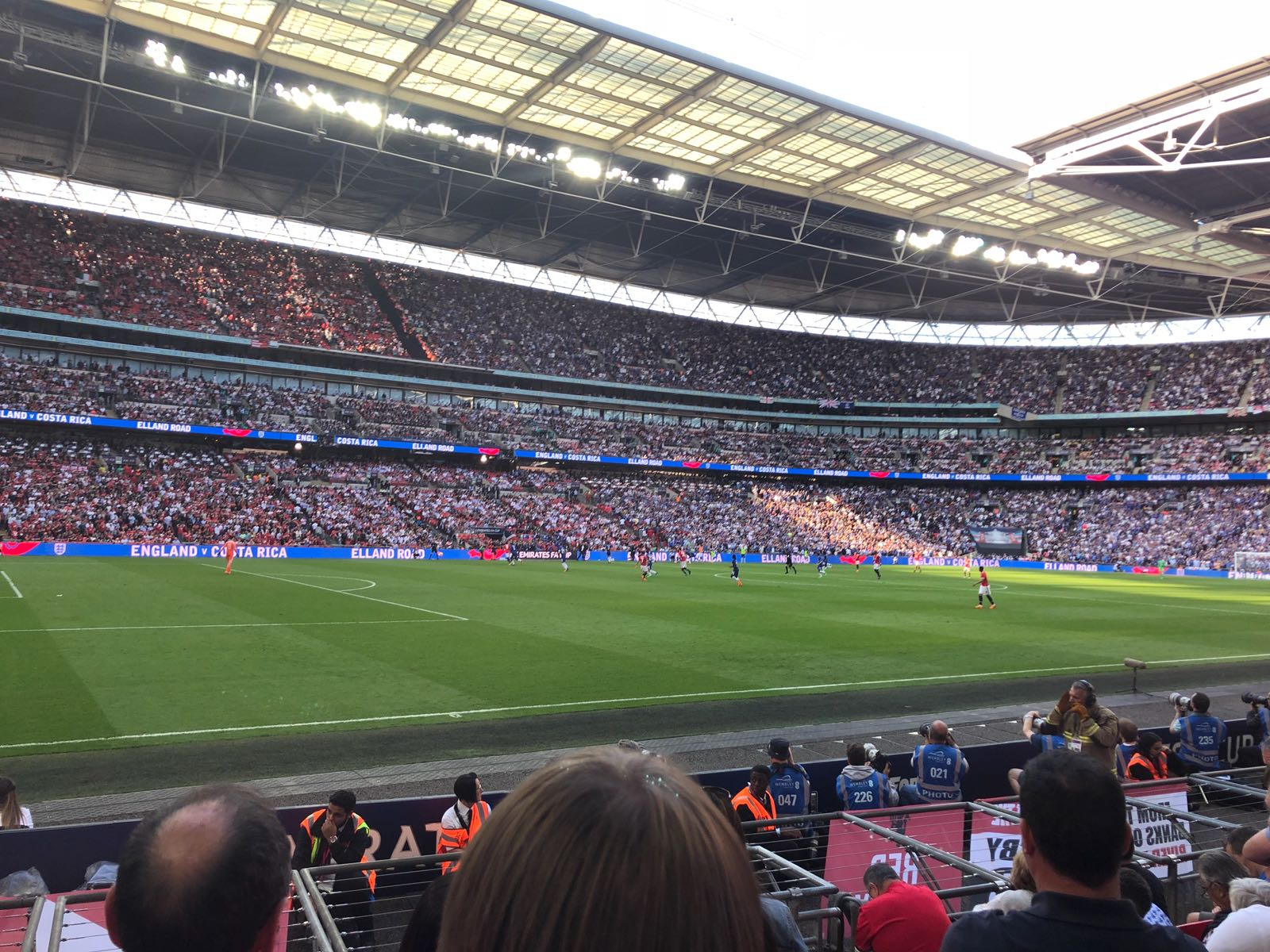
The game during the second half

No changes to either team were made during half time and Chelsea kicked off the second half. Seven minutes in, Young was fouled by Moses and United were awarded a free kick which was taken by Rashford. Pogba missed his header and Courtois was able to punch the ball clear. Two minutes later, Young received the ball from Herrera but chipped his shot over the Chelsea crossbar. Herrera then sent Antonio Valencia clear in the Chelsea box: he chose to pass to Rashford whose strike was cleared by Courtois, before Pogba's attempt was gathered by the goalkeeper. In the 57th minute, a corner from Pogba was cleared, and Hazard's quick break was ended by a Valencia foul for which he received the second booking of the game. Matić then shot wide of the Chelsea goal before Hazard's strike was saved by De Gea at the other end of the pitch. On 63 minutes, Rashford was brought down, winning a free kick which he took himself, finding Jones in the middle of the Chelsea penalty area. His header to the bottom-right corner was goal-bound but Courtois pushed it away, only for Sánchez to knee the ball into the net. The goal was subsequently disallowed as Sánchez was adjudged to have been in an offside position, which was then confirmed by VAR.

United continued to dominate the second half but in the 71st minute, Chelsea's Kanté made a run into the United penalty area and passed to Alonso whose shot was parried by De Gea. Moses attempted to take the rebound past Young, but the ball deflected off the United player's arm. Appeals for a penalty were turned down with VAR making the decision. In the 73rd minute, Rashford was sent clear by Lingard, but his shot was saved by Courtois. United then made the first substitutions of the afternoon, with Lingard and Rashford being replaced by Anthony Martial and Lukaku. Two minutes later, a shot from Martial was deflected and caught by Courtois before a clash of heads between Giroud and Jones meant the United defender had to leave the pitch for medical attention. With ten minutes remaining, a 25-yard (23 m) strike from Matić was pushed away by the United goalkeeper for a corner, from which Azpilicueta's deflected shot was caught by De Gea. Pogba then sent a header wide of the Chelsea goal before Sánchez's shot from 20 yards (18 m) went just wide of the post. With three minutes of the match left, Mata came on for Jones before Martial's lofted shot went high over the goal. In the 89th minute Chelsea made their first substitution with Morata coming on for Giroud, and shortly after, Hazard was replaced by Willian. Five minutes of additional time were indicated, and three minutes in, Courtois was booked for time-wasting. Despite late chances for both sides, no further goals were scored and the match ended 1–0 to Chelsea.

=== Details ===
19 May 2018
17:15 BST

Chelsea	1–0	Manchester United
Hazard 22' (pen.)	Reports

Wembley Stadium, London
Attendance: 87,647
Referee: Michael Oliver (Northumberland)

Chelsea	Manchester United

GK	13	(Belgium) Thibaut Courtois	(yellow card) 90+3'
CB	28	(Spain) César Azpilicueta
CB	24	(England) Gary Cahill (c)
CB	2	(Germany) Antonio Rüdiger
RWB	15	(Nigeria) Victor Moses
CM	14	(France) Tiémoué Bakayoko
CDM	7	(France) N'Golo Kanté
CM	4	(Spain) Cesc Fàbregas
LWB	3	(Spain) Marcos Alonso
CF	10	(Belgium) Eden Hazard		(substituted off) 90+1'
CF	18	(France) Olivier Giroud		(substituted off) 89'
Substitutes:
GK	1	(Argentina) Willy Caballero
DF	21	(Italy) Davide Zappacosta
DF	50	(England) Trevoh Chalobah
MF	8	(England) Ross Barkley
MF	11	(Spain) Pedro
MF	22	(Brazil) Willian		(substituted on) 90+1'
FW	9	(Spain) Álvaro Morata		(substituted on) 89'
Head coach:
(Italy) Antonio Conte

GK	1	(Spain) David de Gea
RB	25	(Ecuador) Antonio Valencia (c)	(yellow card) 58'
CB	12	(England) Chris Smalling
CB	4	(England) Phil Jones	(yellow card) 21'	(substituted off) 87'
LB	18	(England) Ashley Young
CM	21	(Spain) Ander Herrera
CM	31	(Serbia) Nemanja Matić
CM	6	(France) Paul Pogba
RF	14	(England) Jesse Lingard		(substituted off) 73'
CF	19	(England) Marcus Rashford		(substituted off) 73'
LF	7	(Chile) Alexis Sánchez
Substitutes:
GK	20	(Argentina) Sergio Romero
DF	3	(Ivory Coast) Eric Bailly
DF	36	(Italy) Matteo Darmian
MF	8	(Spain) Juan Mata		(substituted on) 87'
MF	39	(Scotland) Scott McTominay
FW	9	(Belgium) Romelu Lukaku		(substituted on) 73'
FW	11	(France) Anthony Martial		(substituted on) 73'
Manager:
(Portugal) José Mourinho

Man of the Match:
Antonio Rüdiger (Chelsea)

Assistant referees:
Ian Hussin (Liverpool)
Lee Betts (Norfolk)
Fourth official:
Lee Mason (Lancashire)
Reserve assistant referee:
Constantine Hatzidakis (Kent)
Video assistant referee:
Neil Swarbrick (Lancashire)
Assistant video assistant referee:
Mick McDonough (Northumberland)

Match rules

- 90 minutes
- 30 minutes of extra time if necessary
- Penalty shoot-out if scores still level
- Seven named substitutes
- Maximum of three substitutions, with a fourth allowed in extra time

=== Statistics ===
Statistics
	Chelsea	Manchester United
Total shots	6	18
Shots on target	3	5
Corner kicks	5	9
Fouls committed	11	13
Possession	33%	67%
Yellow cards	1	2
Red cards	0	0

== Post-match ==
As President of The Football Association, Prince William, Duke of Cambridge would normally have attended the final and presented the trophy to the winning captain at the conclusion of the game. However, as the final was scheduled for the same day as his brother's wedding, for which he was serving as best man, the trophy was instead presented by Jackie Wilkins, the widow of former Manchester United and Chelsea player Ray Wilkins, who died in April 2018. Chelsea's Rüdiger was named man of the match.

Cahill, the winning captain, said "We had a lot of defending to do ... This is a dream come true, as this is the first one as captain". Hazard added: "We tried to defend well. We scored one goal, it's enough today." Conte was upbeat: "I'm very satisfied because today was very difficult ... It showed great desire to finish the season in the right way despite the great difficulty we have had". Mourinho was indignant in defeat: "I congratulate them because they won, but I don't think they deserve to win. I congratulate because I am a sportsman." He also opined: "Every defeat hurts, but for me personally the ones that hurt less are when you give everything and you go without any regrets". BBC Sport correspondent Phil McNulty highlighted the performance of the Chelsea players Hazard, Courtois, Kanté, Cahill and Rüdiger, while criticising United trio Jones, Sánchez and Pogba. Sam Wallace, writing in The Daily Telegraph declared that "this was a dreadful final".

Chelsea won £1.8 million for winning the final and became the first club to win the FA Cup, the Women's FA Cup and the FA Youth Cup in the same season. As winners, Chelsea qualified for the group stage of the 2018–19 UEFA Europa League, although they had qualified for that phase already via their league position. This meant that Arsenal, who finished sixth in the league, gained qualification for the Europa League. Chelsea also earned the right to play 2017–18 Premier League champions Manchester City for the 2018 FA Community Shield.

It was the first time that Mourinho had lost a cup final in charge of an English team, after seven consecutive victories, and the defeat sealed his third-ever full season without winning silverware. It was the first domestic cup won by Conte, who lost the 2012 Coppa Italia Final with Juventus and the previous season's FA Cup Final as Chelsea manager. Conte was sacked by Chelsea in July 2018 before becoming the manager of Inter Milan on a three-year deal beginning with the 2019–20 Serie A season. He was replaced by Maurizio Sarri the following day. Mourinho remained through the summer at Manchester United, but, that December, with Manchester United 19 points behind the league leaders Liverpool, he was dismissed.
