= List of football clubs in the Cook Islands =

This is a list of football clubs in the Cook Islands.

== Clubs ==
- Puaikura F.C.
- Avatiu FC
- Matavera FC
- Nikao Sokattack FC
- PTC Coconuts
- Takuvaine FC
- Titikaveka FC
- Tupapa Maraerenga FC
- Vaipae (Aitutaki Football Association)
- Au (Aitutaki Football Association)
