= Eltham AFC =

- Full name: Eltham Association Football Club
- Founded: 1974
- Ground: Taumata Park, Eltham, New Zealand
- Coordinates: -39.43° S, 174.29° E
- League: Taranaki Division 2
- 2026: Taranaki Division 2, 3rd of 10
- Website: https://www.sporty.co.nz/elthamafc

Eltham AFC are a New Zealand association football club based in Eltham, in the Taranaki Region of the North Island. Its home ground is Taumata Park. The club competes in the Taranaki Division 2.

Eltham AFC has competed for the Chatham Cup twice, in 1978 and 1979, and was knocked out in the first round on both occasions.

== Honours ==
Duff Rose Bowl (Taranaki's premier knock-out trophy): 2009, 2018

Central Football Federation Cup: 2018

== History ==
An earlier association football club at Eltham was formed in a meeting at the Eltham Fire Brigade station in April 1906, with 20 members registered and Mr. W. H. Hutchinson appointed secretary. Eltham along with Kaponga and Hāwera were affiliated to the Taranaki Association Football Union in May 1906. The club won its first and only Taranaki Championship in 1906, beating New Plymouth in the final held at Inglewood.

The Taumata Park grandstand overlooking the club's home ground is Eltham’s Second World War memorial. It was opened on 10 August 1957.
