= Kaponga Soccer Club =

New Zealand association football club

- Full name: Kaponga Soccer Club
- Founded: 1906
- Ground: Victoria Park, Kaponga
- League: Taranaki Division Two
- 2025: 4th of 8
- Website: https://www.sporty.co.nz/kapongasoccer/Home
Home colours

Kaponga Soccer Club is an association football club based in the South Taranaki town of Kaponga, New Zealand, initially founded in 1906.

The Kaponga senior men's team currently play in the Taranaki Division Two administered by Central Football as Charrúa Kaponga.

== History ==
Early years

1906 - 1914

Kaponga won the Taranaki Championship (Julian Cup) twice in 1909 and 1912.

1923 - 1926

After reformation in 1923, Kaponga won the Taranaki Championship for a third time in 1924.

1954 - 1959

Kaponga again reformed in 1954 and won the Taranaki Southern Division.

The 1954 Taranaki Championship Final was lost to Taranaki Northern Division champions and eventual 1954 Julian Cup winner, New Plymouth Old Boys.

Kaponga once again disbanded before 1960.

1970 - 2025

== Grounds ==
The club is centered at Victoria Park in Kaponga, where the primary clubrooms are located. Matches are also frequently held at Alamein Park, located at the southern end of the township.

== Honours ==
- Taranaki Championship (H.R. Julian Cup)
  - Winners (3): 1909, 1912, 1924
- Manaia Hibernian Society 7-a-side Cup
  - Winners (1): 1926
- Taranaki Southern Division
  - Winners (1): 1954

== See also ==
- Football in New Zealand
- Taranaki (region)
