= Lindsey Robinson =

English football referee

- Full name: Lindsey Robinson
- Born: Blyth, England
| Years | | Role |
| 2008- | | Referee |

Lindsey Robinson (born 1980) is an English football referee who is currently the Referee Development Manager for New Zealand Football.

== Early life ==
Robinson grew up in the north-east of England and, along with her twin sister and two older brothers, took interest in football from an early age. She began playing football as a youth with Blyth Spartans Kestrels and later played for Sunderland and Newcastle United. She earned a degree in sport and exercise development from the University of Sunderland.

== Career ==
Robinson took a referee course in 2008, while working as a women's football development officer in County Durham. She became the first woman to referee in her local Sunday men's league, and received successive promotions in the early years of her career, regularly officiating matches in the Northern League Division Two, the Durham and Sunderland League, and the Durham County Cup.

Robinson later took up the role of Referee Development Officer for the Northumberland FA and was a regular official in the Women's Premier League and Women's Super League. She was an assistant referee at the Women's FA Cup final in 2014 and 2016. She was selected to referee the 2018 Women's FA Cup Final.

Later that year, she moved to New Zealand to take up a job as Football South's Referee Development Manager. In Robinson's first year in the role, the number of female referees registered with the federation almost doubled as she took part in initiatives such as the Capital Football Female Referee Development Programme. In 2021, she was appointed as Referee Development Manager for New Zealand Football.

Robinson refereed a ceremonial friendly match between two teams of local girls, held on a temporary pitch close to Mount Cook, to mark the one month countdown to the start of the 2023 FIFA Women's World Cup.
