= Aitutaki Football Association =

Governing body of association football in Aitutaki

- Headquarters: AFA Headquarters
- Location: Aitutaki, Cook Islands
- President: Tiraa Arere

The Aitutaki Football Association (also known as the Aitutaki Island Football Soccer Association) is the governing body for association football in the island of Aitutaki, Cook Islands. They are responsible for the governance and development of football at all levels in the area.

They oversee the Aitutaki football team and Aitutaki under-18 football team, as well as competitions on the island.

== History ==
The Aitutaki Football Association is a full member of the Cook Islands Football Association, and regularly send teams to Rarotonga to compete in the Kia Orana Youth Football Festival and Cook Islands Games. In 2013, FIFA's Goal Project funded the building of the Aitutaki Football Association Headquarters, which was opened in May 2013.
