= Papatoetoe United =

- Full name: Papatoetoe United Football Club
- Founded: 1996
- Ground: Kolmar Sports Centre
- Capacity: 5,000
- League: NRF Division 5
- 2026: NRF Division 5, 2nd of 8
Home colours

Papatoetoe United Football Club is a football club based in Papatoetoe, a suburb of Auckland, New Zealand. Founded in 1996, the club has a rich history and is known for its unique contributions to the local football community. The club competes in the NRF Division 5.

== History ==
Papatoetoe United was established in 1996 and has since become an integral part of the football scene in Papatoetoe and the wider Auckland region. The club has a strong tradition of promoting youth development and providing opportunities for local players to showcase their talent. Over the years, Papatoetoe United has produced several notable players who have gone on to represent professional clubs and even the New Zealand national team.

== Facilities ==
The club’s home ground is the Kolmar Sports Centre, which has a capacity of approximately 5,000 spectators. The venue includes pitches and amenities for players and spectators. Papatoetoe United manages the facility for those involved.

== Youth Development ==
One of the key strengths of Papatoetoe United is its focus on youth development. The club places great emphasis on nurturing young talent and providing a platform for players to develop their skills. It operates a comprehensive youth academy, offering coaching programs and opportunities for aspiring footballers to progress through various age groups. The club's commitment to youth development has led to the emergence of talented players who have achieved success at regional and national levels.

== Community engagement ==
Papatoetoe United actively engages with the local community and strives to make a positive impact beyond the football pitch. The club organises various community events, such as coaching clinics, tournaments, and fundraisers, to promote inclusivity and foster a sense of belonging among residents. Through these initiatives, Papatoetoe United has become a symbol of community pride, uniting people of diverse backgrounds through the love of football.
