= Central Football (New Zealand) =

New Zealand football club

- Headquarters: 46 Clyde Jeffery Drive, Park Island, Napier
- FIFA affiliation: New Zealand Football
- Chief Executive: [Darren Mason]
- Website: official website

Central Football is one of six federations of New Zealand Football, representing regions of Taranaki, Whanganui, Manawatū, Hawke's Bay and Gisborne.

== History ==
While New Zealand Football is the governing body, unlike other sports in New Zealand, the funding model for football means each seven regional federations look after football in their area themselves, only following New Zealand Football's plan as they see fit. For the local federations, the clubs fund the federation with the rest of the money coming from Sport New Zealand funding and about three per cent from New Zealand Football.

The region has also provided a women's representative team for the New Zealand Women's National League from its inaugural season in 2002 onwards.

== Board Members ==
As of 2022.

- Jamie Hall (Chairperson)
- Gary Mackenzie (Deputy Chair)
- Kerry Donovan
- Rod Pelosi
- Garret Blair
- Rori Moore
- John Sigurdsson
- Rachel Ingram

== Competitions ==
- Central League
- Central Federation League
- Women's Central League

Note: Central League includes teams from the Capital Football Federation and is a lower North Island competition managed by Capital Football.

== Affiliated clubs ==
As of 2022.

Manawatū Ashhurst Pohangina FC Bulls-Ohakea Junior FC Dannevirke SC Inc Feilding United AFC Hawks Women's SC Hokowhitu FC Levin AFC Manawatu Plunderers FC Marton United Massey University Football Club North End AFC Pahiatua FC Palmerston North Marist FC Red Sox Manawatu SC Ruahine AFC Takaro AFC Woodville AFC Palmerston North United FC	Gisborne Eastland Junior Football Inc Gisborne Bohemians FC Gisborne Marist Gisborne Thistle Gisborne United Riverina AFC Shockers FC Inc Wainui SC Wairoa Athletic AFC	Hawke's Bay Hastings Hastings Hibernian Sports Club Inc Haumoana Football Club Inc Havelock North Wanderers AFC Maycenvale United Western Rangers FC Central Hawkes Bay CHB Junior Football Inc Napier Eskview United FC Marewa United Napier City Rovers FC Napier Marist FC Napier South FC Port Hill United FC Scindians Taradale AFC	Whanganui Castlecliff Football Club Durie Hill FC Football Whanganui Hunterville SC Rivercity FC Station United Whanganui Athletic Wanganui City FC Wanganui Marist FC	Taranaki Bell Block United Junior FC Coastal Opunake Junior SC Eltham AFC FC Western Hāwera FC Inglewood AFC Kaponga SC Moturoa AFC New Plymouth Rangers Kaitake FC Oakura Junior SC Peringa United AFC Stratford AFC Waitara SC Woodleigh FC

== Central Federation Cup ==
The Lotto Central Federation Cup is the premier men's knock-out trophy of the Central Football Federation and is contested annually by clubs affiliated to the Central Football Federation.

Originally launched in 2001, the Central Federation Cup in its current form relaunched in 2009, and has been competed for each season since, with the exception of the COVID-19 affected 2020 season, when the first round of matches was initially scheduled then subsequently cancelled.

=== Central Federation Cup Champions ===
- 2009 - Wanganui City AFC
- 2010 - Gisborne City AFC
- 2011 - Maycenvale United²
- 2012 - Napier City Rovers FC²
- 2013 - Havelock North Wanderers AFC
- 2014 - Gisborne United AFC
- 2015 - Hāwera FC
- 2016 - Napier City Rovers FC²
- 2017 - Massey University Football Club
- 2018 - Eltham AFC
- 2019 - Massey University Football Club
- 2020 - Not contested
- 2021 - Massey University Football Club
- 2022 - Gisborne United AFC
- 2023 - Whanganui Athletic²
- 2024 - Taradale AFC
- 2025 - Napier City Rovers FC²
- ² denotes a club reserve side

== See also ==
- Association football in New Zealand
- Northern Region Football
- WaiBOP Football
- Capital Football
- Mainland Football
- Southern Football
