= 2018 Women's FA Cup final =

English football cup final

- The match programme cover
- Event: 2017–18 Women's FA Cup
Arsenal	Chelsea
1	3
- Date: 5 May 2018
- Venue: Wembley Stadium, London
- Player of the Match: Ramona Bachmann (Chelsea)
- Referee: Lindsey Robinson (Durham)
- Attendance: 45,423

The 2018 Women's FA Cup final was the 48th final of the FA Women's Cup, England's primary cup competition for women's football teams. The showpiece event was the 25th to be played directly under the auspices of the Football Association (FA) and was named the SSE Women's FA Cup Final due to sponsorship reasons.

The final was contested between Arsenal and Chelsea on 5 May 2018 at Wembley Stadium in London. The match was broadcast on BBC1. Chelsea won the match 3–1 in front of a record crowd of 45,423 to clinch their second title. As their men's counterpart won the 2017–18 FA Cup, Chelsea became the third club, after Southampton and Arsenal, to win both the men's and women's FA Cup in the same season.

== Match details ==
5 May 2018
17:30 BST

Arsenal	1–3	Chelsea
Miedema 73'	Report	Bachmann 48', 60'; Kirby 76'

Wembley Stadium, London
Attendance: 45,423
Referee: Lindsey Robinson (Durham)

Arsenal	Chelsea

GK	1	(Netherlands) Sari van Veenendaal
RB	18	(Scotland) Lisa Evans		(substituted off) 84'
CB	6	(England) Leah Williamson
CB	16	(Republic of Ireland) Louise Quinn
LB	3	(Scotland) Emma Mitchell		(substituted off) 84'
CM	20	(Netherlands) Dominique Janssen	(yellow card) 42'	(substituted off) 63'
AM	7	(Netherlands) Daniëlle van de Donk
AM	10	(Scotland) Kim Little (c)
LW	23	(England) Beth Mead
RW	8	(England) Jordan Nobbs
CF	11	(Netherlands) Vivianne Miedema
Substitutes:
GK	13	(England) Anna Moorhouse
DF	25	(Sweden) Jessica Samuelsson
MF	17	(United States) Heather O'Reilly		(substituted on) 63'
FW	9	(England) Danielle Carter		(substituted on) 84'
FW	15	(Republic of Ireland) Katie McCabe		(substituted on) 84'
Manager:
(Australia) Joe Montemurro

GK	1	(Sweden) Hedvig Lindahl
CB	4	(England) Millie Bright
CB	18	(Norway) Maren Mjelde
CB	16	(Sweden) Magdalena Eriksson
LB	20	(Sweden) Jonna Andersson	(substituted off) 70'
RB	3	(England) Hannah Blundell
CM	10	(South Korea) Ji So-yun
CM	17	(England) Katie Chapman (c)
AM	24	(England) Drew Spence	(substituted off) 74'
FW	14	(England) Fran Kirby
FW	23	(Switzerland) Ramona Bachmann	(substituted off) 85'
Substitutes:
GK	28	(England) Carly Telford
DF	2	(Norway) Maria Thorisdottir	(substituted on) 70'
DW	5	(England) Gilly Flaherty
MF	22	(Scotland) Erin Cuthbert	(substituted on) 74'
FW	9	(England) Eniola Aluko	(substituted on) 85'
Manager:
(England) Emma Hayes

Player of the match
Ramona Bachmann (Chelsea)

Assistant referees:
Stacey Pearson (Somerset)
Kirsty Dowle (Kent)
Fourth official:
Helen Byrne (Liverpool)

Match rules

- 90 minutes.
- 30 minutes of extra-time if necessary.
- Penalty shoot-out if scores still level.
- Five named substitutes.
- Maximum of three substitutions.

== In popular culture ==
Ahead of the game, Subbuteo launched an all-women game set for the first time.
