= 2017–18 FA Cup =

Football Association Challenge Cup

Tournament details
- Country: England; Wales
- Dates: 5 August – 14 October 2017 (qualifying competition); 3 November 2017 – 19 May 2018 (main competition)
- Teams: 737 (overall); 645 (qualifying competition); 124 (main competition)

Final positions
- Champions: Chelsea (8th title)
- Runners-up: Manchester United

Tournament statistics
- Matches played: 149
- Goals scored: 432 (2.9 per match)
- Attendance: 1,875,938 (12,590 per match)
- Top goal scorer(s): Will Grigg (7 goals)
- (Note: All statistics do not include qualifying play-offs)

The 2017–18 FA Cup (also known as the FA Challenge Cup) was the 137th edition of the oldest recognised football tournament in the world. It was sponsored by Emirates, and known as the Emirates FA Cup for sponsorship purposes. 737 clubs were accepted into the tournament. It began with the Extra preliminary round on 5 August 2017, and concluded with the final on 19 May 2018. The winners qualified for the 2018–19 UEFA Europa League group stage.

The third-round match between Brighton & Hove Albion and Crystal Palace on 8 January 2018 was the first competitive game in England where video assistant referee (VAR) technology was available, although it was not used.

Kelechi Iheanacho of Leicester City became the first player to score a goal awarded by a video assistant referee (VAR) in competitive English football as Leicester beat Fleetwood Town 2–0 in the FA Cup third-round replay on 16 January 2018. Referee Jon Moss initially disallowed the goal for offside but he consulted with video official Mike Jones, who told him Nathan Pond's trailing foot was keeping Iheanacho onside. The goal was awarded 67 seconds after it hit the back of the net.

Craig Pawson became the first referee in English football to watch a video recording at the sideline in the fourth round tie between Liverpool and West Bromwich Albion on 27 January 2018. He awarded a penalty to Liverpool.

Premier League side Arsenal were the defending champions, but they were eliminated by Nottingham Forest in the third round on 7 January 2018.

== Calendar and prizes ==
Round	Main date	Leagues entering at this round	New entries this round	Winners from previous round	Number of fixtures	Prize money
For the previous rounds look 2017–18 FA Cup qualifying rounds
First round proper	4 November 2017	EFL League One; EFL League Two	48	32	40	£18,000
Second round proper	2 December 2017	none	none	40	20	£27,000
Third round proper	6 January 2018	Premier League; EFL Championship	44	20	32	£67,500
Fourth round proper	27 January 2018	none	none	32	16	£90,000
Fifth round proper	17 February 2018	none	none	16	8	£180,000
Quarter- finals	17–18 March 2018	none	none	8	4	£360,000
Semi-finals	21–22 April 2018	none	none	4	2	£900,000 £450,000 (losers)
Final	19 May 2018	none	none	2	1	£1,800,000 £900,000 (losers)

== Qualifying rounds ==
All teams that entered the competition, but were not members of the Premier League or The Football League, competed in the qualifying rounds to secure one of 32 places available in the first round proper. The qualifying competition began with the extra preliminary round on 5 August 2016, with the final (fourth) qualifying round played over the weekend of 14 October.

The winners from the fourth qualifying round were Tranmere Rovers, Solihull Moors, Hartlepool United, Chorley, Shaw Lane, AFC Telford United, Gainsborough Trinity, Nantwich Town, AFC Fylde, Guiseley, Kidderminster Harriers, Hyde United, Gateshead, Macclesfield Town, Billericay Town, Leyton Orient, Hereford, Aldershot Town, Chelmsford City, Oxford City, Maidenhead United, Heybridge Swifts, Woking, Truro City, Bromley, Slough Town, Dartford, Boreham Wood, Maidstone United, Leatherhead, Sutton United and Ebbsfleet United.

Shaw Lane and Truro City were appearing in the competition proper for the first time. The reconstituted Hereford was also appearing at this stage for the first time in their own right, only three years after their formation following the demise of Hereford United. Truro City was only the second club from Cornwall ever to qualify for the first round of the FA Cup, with Falmouth Town last having done so in 1969-70. Of this season's other successful qualifiers, Billericay Town had not featured at this stage since 2007-08, Leatherhead had not done so since 2006-07, Heybridge Swifts since 2002-03, Hyde United since 1994-95 and Chorley since 1990-91.

== First round proper ==
The first round draw took place on 16 October and was broadcast live on BBC Two and BT Sport. All 40 first round proper ties were played on the weekend of 4 November. 32 teams from the qualifying competition joined the 48 teams from League One and League Two to compete in this round. The round included two teams from Level 8, Heybridge Swifts and Hyde United, who were the lowest-ranked teams still in the competition.

3 November 2017	Port Vale (4)	2–0	Oxford United (3)	Burslem, Stoke-on-Trent
19:45 GMT	Gunning 16'; Pope 53'	Report		Stadium: Vale Park; Attendance: 3,443; Referee: Mark Heywood

3 November 2017	Notts County (4)	4–2	Bristol Rovers (3)	Nottingham
19:45 GMT	Yates 30', 31'; Stead 58'; Grant 90+6'	Report	Sercombe 8'; Sinclair 12'	Stadium: Meadow Lane; Attendance: 4,228; Referee: Graham Salisbury

3 November 2017	Hyde United (8)	0–4	Milton Keynes Dons (3)	Hyde
19:55 GMT		Report	Nesbitt 14'; Aneke 45+3'; Ebanks-Landell 67'; Upson 73'	Stadium: Ewen Fields; Attendance: 3,123; Referee: David Webb

4 November 2017	Shaw Lane (7)	1–3	Mansfield Town (4)	Barnsley
12:30 GMT	Bennett 41'	Report	Pearce 34'; Rose 73', 78'	Stadium: Sheerien Park; Attendance: 1,576; Referee: Ben Toner

4 November 2017	Stevenage (4)	5–0	Nantwich Town (7)	Stevenage
15:00 GMT	Godden 16', 76', 88'; Smith 68', 73'	Report		Stadium: Broadhall Way; Attendance: 1,436; Referee: Michael Salisbury

4 November 2017	Bradford City (3)	2–0	Chesterfield (4)	Bradford
15:00 GMT	Gilliead 4'; Jones 44'	Report		Stadium: Valley Parade; Attendance: 4,747; Referee: Anthony Backhouse

4 November 2017	Morecambe (4)	3–0	Hartlepool United (5)	Morecambe
15:00 GMT	Ellison 4'; Fleming 67'; Loach 85' (o.g.)	Report		Stadium: Globe Arena; Attendance: 2,004; Referee: Tom Nield

4 November 2017	Yeovil Town (4)	1–0	Southend United (3)	Yeovil
15:00 GMT	Khan 29' (pen.)	Report		Stadium: Huish Park; Attendance: 2,079; Referee: Craig Hicks

4 November 2017	Peterborough United (3)	1–1	Tranmere Rovers (5)	Peterborough
15:00 GMT	Marriott 52'	Report	Cook 72'	Stadium: London Road; Attendance: 3,750; Referee: Charles Breakspear

15 November 2017 Replay	Tranmere Rovers (5)	0–5	Peterborough United (3)	Birkenhead
19:45 GMT		Report	Lloyd 16', 22', 73'; Baldwin 67'; Maddison 75' (pen.)	Stadium: Prenton Park; Attendance: 4,199; Referee: Michael Salisbury

4 November 2017	Forest Green Rovers (4)	1–0	Macclesfield Town (5)	Nailsworth
15:00 GMT	Doidge 42'	Report		Stadium: The New Lawn; Attendance: 1,387; Referee: Trevor Kettle

4 November 2017	AFC Fylde (5)	4–2	Kidderminster Harriers (6)	Wesham
15:00 GMT	Rowe 14', 48'; Smith 54'; Finley 64'	Report	Taylor 74'; Brown 90+2'	Stadium: Mill Farm; Attendance: 1,482; Referee: Daniel Middleton

4 November 2017	Luton Town (4)	1–0	Portsmouth (3)	Luton
15:00 GMT	Collins 45+1'	Report		Stadium: Kenilworth Road; Attendance: 5,333; Referee: Seb Stockbridge

4 November 2017	Shrewsbury Town (3)	5–0	Aldershot Town (5)	Shrewsbury
15:00 GMT	Rodman 20'; Whalley 24' (pen.); Payne 62'; Gnahoua 66'; Morris 68'	Report		Stadium: New Meadow; Attendance: 3,859; Referee: Ross Joyce

4 November 2017	Hereford (7)	1–0	AFC Telford United (6)	Hereford
15:00 GMT	Mills 68'	Report		Stadium: Edgar Street; Attendance: 4,712; Referee: Thomas Bramall

4 November 2017	Blackburn Rovers (3)	3–1	Barnet (4)	Blackburn
15:00 GMT	Nuttall 63'; Graham 70'; Antonsson 81'	Report	Akinola 31'	Stadium: Ewood Park; Attendance: 3,710; Referee: Carl Boyeson

4 November 2017	Ebbsfleet United (5)	2–6	Doncaster Rovers (3)	Northfleet
15:00 GMT	Kedwell 35' (pen.); Coulson 37'	Report	Rowe 45+1', 85'; Marquis 45+3'; Coppinger 52', 83' (pen.); Houghton 78'	Stadium: Stonebridge Road; Attendance: 2,069; Referee: Lee Collins

4 November 2017	Boreham Wood (5)	2–1	Blackpool (3)	Borehamwood
15:00 GMT	Turgott 68'; Holman 88'	Report	Philliskirk 62'	Stadium: Meadow Park; Attendance: 1,041; Referee: Chris Sarginson

4 November 2017	Colchester United (4)	0–1	Oxford City (6)	Colchester
15:00 GMT		Report	Paterson 46'	Stadium: Colchester Community Stadium; Attendance: 1,775; Referee: Alan Young

4 November 2017	Plymouth Argyle (3)	1–0	Grimsby Town (4)	Plymouth
15:00 GMT	Carey 9'	Report		Stadium: Home Park; Attendance: 5,137; Referee: John Busby

4 November 2017	AFC Wimbledon (3)	1–0	Lincoln City (4)	Norbiton, London
15:00 GMT	Taylor 7'	Report		Stadium: Kingsmeadow; Attendance: 3,394; Referee: Andy Woolmer

4 November 2017	Rochdale (3)	4–0	Bromley (5)	Rochdale
15:00 GMT	Inman 10', 53'; Henderson 31' (pen.), 84'	Report		Stadium: Spotland Stadium; Attendance: 2,241; Referee: Andrew Miller

4 November 2017	Carlisle United (4)	3–2	Oldham Athletic (3)	Carlisle
15:00 GMT	Bennett 22', 60'; Hope 36'	Report	Clarke 64'; Holloway 72'	Stadium: Brunton Park; Attendance: 3,965; Referee: Andy Haines

4 November 2017	Cheltenham Town (4)	2–4	Maidstone United (5)	Cheltenham
15:00 GMT	Dawson 52'; Finney 62' (o.g.)	Report	Sam-Yorke 20', 53'; Pigott 21'; Hines 43'	Stadium: Whaddon Road; Attendance: 2,799; Referee: Kevin Johnson

4 November 2017	Crewe Alexandra (4)	2–1	Rotherham United (3)	Crewe
15:00 GMT	Walker 47'; Ainley 89'	Report	Vaulks 21'	Stadium: Gresty Road; Attendance: 2,597; Referee: Scott Oldham

4 November 2017	Gillingham (3)	2–1	Leyton Orient (5)	Gillingham
15:00 GMT	Parker 20'; Eaves 75'	Report	Dayton 79'	Stadium: Priestfield Stadium; Attendance: 3,659; Referee: John Brooks

4 November 2017	Gainsborough Trinity (6)	0–6	Slough Town (7)	Gainsborough
15:00 GMT		Report	Lench 35', 46', 84'; Flood 52'; Williams 71'; Fraser 75'	Stadium: The Northolme; Attendance: 1,630; Referee: Peter Wright

4 November 2017	Northampton Town (3)	0–0	Scunthorpe United (3)	Northampton
15:00 GMT		Report		Stadium: Sixfields Stadium; Attendance: 2,820; Referee: Robert Jones

14 November 2017 Replay	Scunthorpe United (3)	1–0	Northampton Town (3)	Scunthorpe
19:45 GMT	Adelakun 32'	Report		Stadium: Glanford Park; Attendance: 1,880; Referee: Andy Haines

4 November 2017	Wigan Athletic (3)	2–1	Crawley Town (4)	Wigan
15:00 GMT	Toney 29'; Evans 71'	Report	Roberts 20'	Stadium: DW Stadium; Attendance: 3,288; Referee: Martin Coy

4 November 2017	Gateshead (5)	2–0	Chelmsford City (6)	Gateshead
15:00 GMT	Burrow 30'; Johnson 34'	Report		Stadium: Gateshead International Stadium; Attendance: 732; Referee: Peter Gibbons

4 November 2017	Newport County (4)	2–1	Walsall (3)	Newport
17:15 GMT	Nouble 18'; McCoulsky 46'	Report	Bakayoko 77'	Stadium: Rodney Parade; Attendance: 2,701; Referee: Gavin Ward

5 November 2017	Cambridge United (4)	1–0	Sutton United (5)	Cambridge
14:00 GMT	Ibehre 45'	Report		Stadium: Abbey Stadium; Attendance: 3,070; Referee: Darren Handley

5 November 2017	Guiseley (5)	0–0	Accrington Stanley (4)	Guiseley
14:00 GMT		Report		Stadium: Nethermoor Park; Attendance: 1,611; Referee: Antony Coggins

14 November 2017 Replay	Accrington Stanley (4)	1–1 (a.e.t.) (3–4 p)	Guiseley (5)	Accrington
19:45 GMT	McConville 47'	Report	Rooney 79' (pen.)	Stadium: Crown Ground; Attendance: 1,166; Referee: Charles Breakspear
	Penalties
	Kee (penalty missed); Brown (penalty missed); McConville (penalty scored); Jackson (penalty scored); Wilks (penalty scored)		Rooney (penalty scored); McFadzean (penalty missed); Haworth (penalty scored); Brown (penalty scored); Fondop (penalty scored)

5 November 2017	Leatherhead (7)	1–1	Billericay Town (7)	Leatherhead
14:00 GMT	Midson 21'	Report	Bricknell 67' (pen.)	Stadium: Fetcham Grove; Attendance: 1,797; Referee: Alan Dale

16 November 2017 Replay	Billericay Town (7)	1–3	Leatherhead (7)	Billericay
19:45 GMT	Cunnington 61'	Report	Midson 68', 82' (pen.); Moore 90+1'	Stadium: New Lodge; Attendance: 3,400; Referee: Dean Whitestone

5 November 2017	Coventry City (4)	2–0	Maidenhead United (5)	Rowleys Green, Coventry
14:00 GMT	Ponticelli 33', 44'	Report		Stadium: Ricoh Arena; Attendance: 3,370; Referee: Scott Duncan

5 November 2017	Dartford (6)	1–5	Swindon Town (4)	Dartford
14:00 GMT	Sho-Silva 83'	Report	Elšnik 12', 26'; Smith 23'; Linganzi 47'; Mullin 50'	Stadium: Princes Park; Attendance: 2,705; Referee: Darren Drysdale

5 November 2017	Woking (5)	1–1	Bury (3)	Woking
14:00 GMT	Philpot 25'	Report	Smith 1'	Stadium: Kingfield Stadium; Attendance: 1,858; Referee: Darren England

14 November 2017 Replay	Bury (3)	0–3	Woking (5)	Bury
19:45 GMT		Report	Charles-Cook 30'; Effiong 71'; Philpot 86'	Stadium: Gigg Lane; Attendance: 1,513; Referee: Ross Joyce

5 November 2017	Solihull Moors (5)	0–2	Wycombe Wanderers (4)	Solihull
14:00 GMT		Report	Freeman 16'; Mackail-Smith 28'	Stadium: Damson Park; Attendance: 1,544; Referee: Brett Huxtable

5 November 2017	Charlton Athletic (3)	3–1	Truro City (6)	Charlton, London
14:00 GMT	Reeves 10', 70'; Marshall 53'	Report	Harvey 59'	Stadium: The Valley; Attendance: 4,494; Referee: Dean Whitestone

5 November 2017	Exeter City (4)	3–1	Heybridge Swifts (8)	Exeter
14:00 GMT	Stockley 59', 63'; McAlinden 86'	Report	Bantick 70'	Stadium: St James Park; Attendance: 3,004; Referee: Neil Hair

6 November 2017	Chorley (6)	1–2	Fleetwood Town (3)	Chorley
19:45 GMT	Carver 58'	Report	D. Cole 77'; Sowerby 90+1'	Stadium: Victory Park; Attendance: 3,526; Referee: Peter Bankes

== Second round proper ==
The second round draw took place on 6 November and was broadcast live on BBC Two and BT Sport. All 20 second round proper ties were played on the weekend of 2 December. This round included three teams from Level 7 – Hereford, Slough Town, and Leatherhead – who were the lowest-ranked teams still in the competition.

1 December 2017	AFC Fylde (5)	1–1	Wigan Athletic (3)	Wesham
19:55 GMT	Rowe 70' (pen.)	Report	Grigg 44'	Stadium: Mill Farm; Attendance: 3,351; Referee: Darren Drysdale

12 December 2017 Replay	Wigan Athletic (3)	3–2	AFC Fylde (5)	Wigan
19:45 GMT	Toney 31'; Grigg 80', 84'	Report	Grand 40'; Rowe 65'	Stadium: DW Stadium; Attendance: 3,124; Referee: Ross Joyce

2 December 2017	Notts County (4)	3–2	Oxford City (6)	Nottingham
12:30 GMT	Duffy 31'; Stead 56' (pen.); Grant 90+5'	Report	Sinclair 53'; Paterson 73'	Stadium: Meadow Lane; Attendance: 5,092; Referee: John Brooks

2 December 2017	Milton Keynes Dons (3)	4–1	Maidstone United (5)	Denbigh, Milton Keynes
15:00 GMT	Nesbitt 54'; Agard 64', 70'; Pawlett 89'	Report	Okuonghae 25'	Stadium: Stadium mk Attendance: 4,804; Referee: Martin Coy

2 December 2017	Port Vale (4)	1–1	Yeovil Town (4)	Burslem, Stoke-on-Trent
15:00 GMT	Pope 63'	Report	Green 89'	Stadium: Vale Park; Attendance: 3,316; Referee: Scott Oldham

12 December 2017 Replay	Yeovil Town (4)	3–2 (a.e.t.)	Port Vale (4)	Yeovil
19:45 GMT	Khan 45+2', 95'; Zoko 109'	Report	Harness 83'; Kay 108'	Stadium: Huish Park; Attendance: 1,588; Referee: Gavin Ward

2 December 2017	Shrewsbury Town (3)	2–0	Morecambe (4)	Shrewsbury
15:00 GMT	Rodman 32'; Whalley 37' (pen.)	Report		Stadium: New Meadow; Attendance: 3,184; Referee: Craig Hicks

2 December 2017	Stevenage (4)	5–2	Swindon Town (4)	Stevenage
15:00 GMT	Samuel 18'; Godden 23'; Pett 45+3'; Newton 72', 77'	Report	Linganzi 33'; Taylor 42'	Stadium: Broadhall Way; Attendance: 1,883; Referee: Nick Kinseley

2 December 2017	Bradford City (3)	3–1	Plymouth Argyle (3)	Bradford
15:00 GMT	Vincelot 38'; Knight-Percival 50'; Wyke 64'	Report	Carey 63'	Stadium: Valley Parade; Attendance: 4,957; Referee: Tony Harrington

2 December 2017	Gillingham (3)	1–1	Carlisle United (4)	Gillingham
15:00 GMT	O'Neill 5'	Report	Grainger 18' (pen.)	Stadium: Priestfield Stadium; Attendance: 3,178; Referee: Andy Woolmer

19 December 2017 Replay	Carlisle United (4)	3–1	Gillingham (3)	Carlisle
19:45 GMT	Hope 7', 37'; Miller 90+3'	Report	Wagstaff 47'	Stadium: Brunton Park; Attendance: 2,357; Referee: Mark Heywood

2 December 2017	Forest Green Rovers (4)	3–3	Exeter City (4)	Nailsworth
15:00 GMT	Doidge 26', 90+2'; Laird 88'	Report	Moore-Taylor 58'; Stockley 64', 90+4'	Stadium: The New Lawn; Attendance: 2,250; Referee: Gavin Ward

12 December 2017 Replay	Exeter City (4)	2–1 (a.e.t.)	Forest Green Rovers (4)	Exeter
19:45 GMT	Sweeney 73' (pen.); Stockley 115'	Report	Doidge 30' (pen.)	Stadium: St James Park; Attendance: 2,923; Referee: Charles Breakspear

2 December 2017	Fleetwood Town (3)	1–1	Hereford (7)	Fleetwood
15:00 GMT	Cole 29'	Report	Dinsley 23'	Stadium: Highbury Stadium; Attendance: 2,567; Referee: Seb Stockbridge

14 December 2017 Replay	Hereford (7)	0–2	Fleetwood Town (3)	Hereford
19:45 GMT		Report	Bolger 10', 58'	Stadium: Edgar Street; Attendance: 4,235; Referee: David Coote

3 December 2017	Woking (5)	1–1	Peterborough United (3)	Woking
14:00 GMT	Ward 84'	Report	Tafazolli 24'	Stadium: Kingfield Stadium; Attendance: 3,072; Referee: Chris Sarginson

12 December 2017 Replay	Peterborough United (3)	5–2	Woking (5)	Peterborough
19:45 GMT	Doughty 29'; Marriott 45', 69'; Maddison 78' (pen.); Edwards 90+4'	Report	Effiong 19'; Young 68'	Stadium: London Road; Attendance: 3,022; Referee: Antony Coggins

3 December 2017	Newport County (4)	2–0	Cambridge United (4)	Newport
14:00 GMT	Labadie 2', 82'	Report		Stadium: Rodney Parade; Attendance: 2,748; Referee: Kevin Johnson

3 December 2017	Wycombe Wanderers (4)	3–1	Leatherhead (7)	High Wycombe
14:00 GMT	Saunders 29'; Mackail-Smith 76'; Akinfenwa 90+1'	Report	Midson 8' (pen.)	Stadium: Adams Park; Attendance: 3,835; Referee: Tim Robinson

3 December 2017	Doncaster Rovers (3)	3–0	Scunthorpe United (3)	Doncaster
14:00 GMT	Rowe 16', 67'; Mandeville 90+2'	Report		Stadium: Keepmoat Stadium; Attendance: 5,251; Referee: Mark Heywood

3 December 2017	AFC Wimbledon (3)	3–1	Charlton Athletic (3)	Norbiton, London
14:00 GMT	McDonald 10'; Taylor 70', 81' (pen.)	Report	Ahearne-Grant 22'	Stadium: Kingsmeadow; Attendance: 3,270; Referee: James Linington

3 December 2017	Mansfield Town (4)	3–0	Guiseley (5)	Mansfield
14:00 GMT	Spencer 31', 52', 65' (pen.)	Report		Stadium: Field Mill; Attendance: 4,081; Referee: Carl Boyeson

3 December 2017	Gateshead (5)	0–5	Luton Town (4)	Gateshead
14:00 GMT		Report	Lee 40'; Potts 62'; Lee 67'; Hylton 90+1'; Berry 90+4'	Stadium: Gateshead International Stadium; Attendance: 1,339; Referee: Ben Toner

3 December 2017	Blackburn Rovers (3)	3–3	Crewe Alexandra (4)	Blackburn
14:00 GMT	Samuel 11', 20'; Graham 15'	Report	Porter 35' (pen.), 66'; Nolan 63'	Stadium: Ewood Park; Attendance: 4,472; Referee: David Webb

13 December 2017 Replay	Crewe Alexandra (4)	0–1	Blackburn Rovers (3)	Crewe
19:45 GMT'		Report	Graham 24'	Stadium: Gresty Road; Attendance: 2,241; Referee: Anthony Backhouse

3 December 2017	Coventry City (4)	3–0	Boreham Wood (5)	Rowleys Green, Coventry
14:00 GMT	Nazon 27'; McNulty 40'; Shipley 48'	Report		Stadium: Ricoh Arena; Attendance: 2,985; Referee: Darren Handley

4 December 2017	Slough Town (7)	0–4	Rochdale (3)	Slough
19:45 GMT		Report	Andrew 13'; Camps 68'; Henderson 89'; Done 90+2'	Stadium: Arbour Park; Attendance: 1,950; Referee: Robert Jones

== Third round proper ==
The third round draw took place on 4 December 2017 and was broadcast live on BBC Two and BT Sport before the final second round tie between Slough Town and Rochdale. All 32 third round proper ties took place on the weekend of 5–8 January 2018. A total of 64 clubs played in the third round; 20 winners of the second round, and 44 teams from Premier League and EFL Championship entering in this round. For the first time in 67 years no non-league team (i.e. from Level 5 or below) made the third round proper, with all 32 such teams that advanced through qualifying being knocked out in the first two rounds, the last 10 in the second round proper.

5 January 2018	Liverpool (1)	2–1	Everton (1)	Liverpool
20:00 GMT	Milner 35' (pen.); Van Dijk 84'	Report	Sigurðsson 67'	Stadium: Anfield; Attendance: 52,513; Referee: Bobby Madley

5 January 2018	Manchester United (1)	2–0	Derby County (2)	Old Trafford, Greater Manchester
20:05 GMT	Lingard 84'; Lukaku 90'	Report		Stadium: Old Trafford; Attendance: 73,899; Referee: Kevin Friend

6 January 2018	Fleetwood Town (3)	0–0	Leicester City (1)	Fleetwood
12:35 GMT		Report		Stadium: Highbury Stadium; Attendance: 5,001; Referee: Simon Hooper

16 January 2018 Replay	Leicester City (1)	2–0	Fleetwood Town (3)	Leicester
19:50 GMT	Iheanacho 43', 77'	Report		Stadium: King Power Stadium; Attendance: 17,237; Referee: Jonathan Moss

6 January 2018	Middlesbrough (2)	2–0	Sunderland (2)	Middlesbrough
14:20 GMT	Gestede 10'; Braithwaite 42'	Report		Stadium: Riverside Stadium; Attendance: 26,399; Referee: Chris Kavanagh

6 January 2018	Ipswich Town (2)	0–1	Sheffield United (2)	Ipswich
15:05 GMT		Report	Thomas 25'	Stadium: Portman Road; Attendance: 12,057; Referee: Mike Jones

6 January 2018	Watford (1)	3–0	Bristol City (2)	Watford
15:05 GMT	Carrillo 37'; Deeney 57'; Capoue 85'	Report		Stadium: Vicarage Road; Attendance: 13,269; Referee: Craig Pawson

6 January 2018	Birmingham City (2)	1–0	Burton Albion (2)	Birmingham
15:05 GMT	Gallagher 56'	Report		Stadium: St Andrews; Attendance: 7,623; Referee: Jeremy Simpson

6 January 2018	Aston Villa (2)	2–3	Peterborough United (3)	Birmingham
15:05 GMT	Davis 8', 64'	Report	Marriott 75', 90+3'; Tafazolli 83'	Stadium: Villa Park; Attendance: 21,677; Referee: Robert Jones

6 January 2018	Bournemouth (1)	2–2	Wigan Athletic (3)	Bournemouth
15:00 GMT	Mousset 55'; S. Cook 90+2'	Report	Grigg 4'; Hyndman 29' (o.g.)	Stadium: Vitality Stadium; Attendance: 9,894; Referee: Andrew Madley

17 January 2018 Replay	Wigan Athletic (3)	3–0	Bournemouth (1)	Wigan
19:45 GMT	Morsy 9'; Burn 73'; Elder 76'	Report		Stadium: DW Stadium; Attendance: 4,709; Referee: Stuart Attwell

6 January 2018	Coventry City (4)	2–1	Stoke City (1)	Rowleys Green, Coventry
15:00 GMT	Willis 24'; Grimmer 68'	Report	Adam 54' (pen.)	Stadium: Ricoh Arena; Attendance: 14,199; Referee: Martin Atkinson

6 January 2018	Bolton Wanderers (2)	1–2	Huddersfield Town (1)	Horwich
15:00 GMT	Derik 64'	Report	Van La Parra 51'; Williams 52'	Stadium: Macron Stadium; Attendance: 11,574; Referee: Roger East

6 January 2018	Yeovil Town (4)	2–0	Bradford City (3)	Yeovil
15:00 GMT	Barnes 61'; Green 76'	Report		Stadium: Huish Park; Attendance: 3,040; Referee: John Brooks

6 January 2018	Brentford (2)	0–1	Notts County (4)	Brentford, London
15:00 GMT		Report	Stead 65'	Stadium: Griffin Park; Attendance: 6,935; Referee: Tim Robinson

6 January 2018	Queens Park Rangers (2)	0–1	Milton Keynes Dons (3)	Shepherd's Bush, London
15:00 GMT		Report	Cissé 60'	Stadium: Loftus Road; Attendance: 6,314; Referee: James Linington

6 January 2018	Exeter City (4)	0–2	West Bromwich Albion (1)	Exeter
15:00 GMT		Report	Rondón 2'; Rodriguez 25'	Stadium: St James Park; Attendance: 5,638; Referee: Lee Mason

6 January 2018	Doncaster Rovers (3)	0–1	Rochdale (3)	Doncaster
15:00 GMT		Report	Andrew 18'	Stadium: Keepmoat Stadium; Attendance: 4,513; Referee: Andy Woolmer

6 January 2018	Blackburn Rovers (3)	0–1	Hull City (2)	Blackburn
15:00 GMT		Report	Aina 58'	Stadium: Ewood Park; Attendance: 6,777; Referee: Oliver Langford

6 January 2018	Cardiff City (2)	0–0	Mansfield Town (4)	Cardiff
15:00 GMT		Report		Stadium: Cardiff City Stadium; Attendance: 6,378; Referee: Lee Probert

16 January 2018 Replay	Mansfield Town (4)	1–4	Cardiff City (2)	Mansfield
19:45 GMT	Rose 35'	Report	Ecuele Manga 34'; Hoilett 66', 89'; Pilkington 71'	Stadium: Field Mill; Attendance: 5,746; Referee: Geoff Eltringham

6 January 2018	Manchester City (1)	4–1	Burnley (1)	Manchester
15:00 GMT	Agüero 56', 58'; Sané 71'; B. Silva 82'	Report	Barnes 25'	Stadium: City of Manchester Stadium; Attendance: 53,285; Referee: Graham Scott

6 January 2018	Wolverhampton Wanderers (2)	0–0	Swansea City (1)	Wolverhampton
15:00 GMT		Report		Stadium: Molineux; Attendance: 22,976; Referee: Anthony Taylor

17 January 2018 Replay	Swansea City (1)	2–1	Wolverhampton Wanderers (2)	Swansea
19:45 GMT	J. Ayew 11'; Bony 69'	Report	Jota 66'	Stadium: Liberty Stadium; Attendance: 8,294; Referee: Chris Kavanagh

6 January 2018	Stevenage (4)	0–0	Reading (2)	Stevenage
15:00 GMT		Report		Stadium: Broadhall Way; Attendance: 3,877; Referee: Ben Toner

16 January 2018 Replay	Reading (2)	3–0	Stevenage (4)	Reading
20:00 GMT	Böðvarsson 32', 44', 64'	Report		Stadium: Madejski Stadium; Attendance: 4,986; Referee: Tim Robinson

6 January 2018	Newcastle United (1)	3–1	Luton Town (4)	Newcastle upon Tyne
15:00 GMT	Pérez 30', 36'; Shelvey 39'	Report	Hylton 49'	Stadium: St James' Park; Attendance: 47,069; Referee: Neil Swarbrick

6 January 2018	Millwall (2)	4–1	Barnsley (2)	Bermondsey, London
15:00 GMT	O'Brien 35', 56'; Thompson 47'; Onyedinma 61'	Report	Potts 11'	Stadium: The Den; Attendance: 5,319; Referee: Darren Bond

6 January 2018	Fulham (2)	0–1	Southampton (1)	Fulham, London
15:00 GMT		Report	Ward-Prowse 29'	Stadium: Craven Cottage; Attendance: 17,327; Referee: Michael Oliver

6 January 2018	Wycombe Wanderers (4)	1–5	Preston North End (2)	High Wycombe
15:00 GMT	O'Nien 45+1'	Report	Harrop 2', 85'; Browne 38', 78' (pen.); Horgan 50'	Stadium: Adams Park; Attendance: 4,928; Referee: Peter Bankes

6 January 2018	Carlisle United (4)	0–0	Sheffield Wednesday (2)	Carlisle
15:00 GMT		Report		Stadium: Brunton Park; Attendance: 7,793; Referee: David Webb

16 January 2018 Replay	Sheffield Wednesday (2)	2–0	Carlisle United (4)	Sheffield
19:45 GMT	Matias 28'; Nuhiu 66'	Report		Stadium: Hillsborough Stadium; Attendance: 12,003; Referee: Michael Salisbury

6 January 2018	Norwich City (2)	0–0	Chelsea (1)	Norwich
17:30 GMT		Report		Stadium: Carrow Road; Attendance: 23,598; Referee: Stuart Attwell

17 January 2018 Replay	Chelsea (1)	1–1 (a.e.t.) (5–3 p)	Norwich City (2)	Fulham, London
19:45 GMT	Batshuayi 55'	Report	Lewis 90+4'	Stadium: Stamford Bridge; Attendance: 39,684; Referee: Graham Scott
	Penalties
	Willian (penalty scored); David Luiz (penalty scored); Azpilicueta (penalty scored); Kanté (penalty scored); Hazard (penalty scored)		(penalty missed) Oliveira; (penalty scored) Maddison; (penalty scored) Vrančić; (penalty scored) Murphy

7 January 2018	Newport County (4)	2–1	Leeds United (2)	Newport
12:00 GMT	Shaughnessy 76' (o.g.); McCoulsky 88'	Report	Berardi 9'	Stadium: Rodney Parade; Attendance: 6,887; Referee: Mike Dean

7 January 2018	Shrewsbury Town (3)	0–0	West Ham United (1)	Shrewsbury
14:00 GMT		Report		Stadium: New Meadow; Attendance: 9,535; Referee: Paul Tierney

16 January 2018 Replay	West Ham United (1)	1–0 (a.e.t.)	Shrewsbury Town (3)	Stratford, London
19:45 GMT	Burke 112'	Report		Stadium: London Stadium; Attendance: 39,867; Referee: Jeremy Simpson

7 January 2018	Tottenham Hotspur (1)	3–0	AFC Wimbledon (3)	Wembley, London
15:00 GMT	Kane 63', 65'; Vertonghen 71'	Report		Stadium: Wembley Stadium; Attendance: 47,527; Referee: David Coote

7 January 2018	Nottingham Forest (2)	4–2	Arsenal (1)	West Bridgford
16:00 GMT	Lichaj 20', 44'; Brereton 64' (pen.); Dowell 85' (pen.)	Report	Mertesacker 23'; Welbeck 79'	Stadium: The City Ground; Attendance: 27,182; Referee: Jonathan Moss

8 January 2018	Brighton & Hove Albion (1)	2–1	Crystal Palace (1)	Falmer, Brighton and Hove
19:45 GMT	Stephens 21'; Murray 87'	Report	Sako 69'	Stadium: Falmer Stadium; Attendance: 14,507; Referee: Andre Marriner

== Fourth round proper ==
The draw for the fourth round proper took place on 8 January 2018 at 19:10 GMT and was broadcast live on BBC Two and BT Sport. This round included four teams from Level 4 – Yeovil Town, Notts County, Coventry City, and Newport County – who were the lowest-ranked teams still in the competition.

26 January 2018	Sheffield Wednesday (2)	3–1	Reading (2)	Sheffield
19:45 GMT	Nuhiu 29', 53'; Boyd 61'	Report	Dawson 87' (o.g.)	Stadium: Hillsborough Stadium; Attendance: 14,848; Referee: John Brooks

26 January 2018	Yeovil Town (4)	0–4	Manchester United (1)	Yeovil
19:55 GMT		Report	Rashford 41'; Herrera 61'; Lingard 89'; Lukaku 90+3'	Stadium: Huish Park; Attendance: 9,195; Referee: Paul Tierney

27 January 2018	Peterborough United (3)	1–5	Leicester City (1)	Peterborough
12:30 GMT	Hughes 58'	Report	Diabaté 9', 87'; Iheanacho 12', 29'; Ndidi 90+2'	Stadium: London Road; Attendance: 13,193; Referee: Michael Oliver

27 January 2018	Huddersfield Town (1)	1–1	Birmingham City (2)	Huddersfield
15:00 GMT	Mounié 21'	Report	Jutkiewicz 54'	Stadium: Kirklees Stadium; Attendance: 12,683; Referee: Neil Swarbrick

6 February 2018 Replay	Birmingham City (2)	1–4 (a.e.t.)	Huddersfield Town (1)	Birmingham
19:45 GMT	Adams 52'	Report	Roberts 60' (o.g.); Mounié 94'; Van La Parra 97'; Ince 106'	Stadium: St Andrew's; Attendance: 13,175; Referee: Paul Tierney

27 January 2018	Notts County (4)	1–1	Swansea City (1)	Nottingham
15:00 GMT	Stead 62'	Report	Narsingh 45'	Stadium: Meadow Lane; Attendance: 9,802; Referee: Mike Jones

6 February 2018 Replay	Swansea City (1)	8–1	Notts County (4)	Swansea
20:05 GMT	Abraham 18', 45+3'; Dyer 20', 30'; Naughton 53'; Routledge 57'; Carroll 65'; James 82'	Report	Husin 35'	Stadium: Liberty Stadium; Attendance: 7,822; Referee: Martin Atkinson

27 January 2018	Milton Keynes Dons (3)	0–1	Coventry City (4)	Denbigh, Milton Keynes
15:00 GMT		Report	Biamou 64'	Stadium: Stadium mk Attendance: 14,925; Referee: Peter Bankes

27 January 2018	Millwall (2)	2–2	Rochdale (3)	Bermondsey, London
15:00 GMT	Wallace 17' (pen.); Thompson 90'	Report	Henderson 32'; Done 53'	Stadium: The Den; Attendance: 8,346; Referee: Andrew Madley

6 February 2018 Replay	Rochdale (3)	1–0	Millwall (2)	Rochdale
19:45 GMT	Henderson 53'	Report		Stadium: Spotland Stadium; Attendance: 2,790; Referee: Tim Robinson

27 January 2018	Southampton (1)	1–0	Watford (1)	Southampton
15:00 GMT	Stephens 4'	Report		Stadium: St Mary's Stadium; Attendance: 25,195; Referee: Bobby Madley

27 January 2018	Middlesbrough (2)	0–1	Brighton & Hove Albion (1)	Middlesbrough
15:00 GMT		Report	Murray 90'	Stadium: Riverside Stadium; Attendance: 20,475; Referee: Anthony Taylor

27 January 2018	Wigan Athletic (3)	2–0	West Ham United (1)	Wigan
15:00 GMT	Grigg 7', 62' (pen.)	Report		Stadium: DW Stadium; Attendance: 14,194; Referee: Chris Kavanagh

27 January 2018	Hull City (2)	2–1	Nottingham Forest (2)	Kingston upon Hull
15:00 GMT	Bowen 18'; Dicko 40'	Report	Vellios 88'	Stadium: KCOM Stadium; Attendance: 13,450; Referee: Stuart Attwell

27 January 2018	Sheffield United (2)	1–0	Preston North End (2)	Sheffield
15:00 GMT	Sharp 80' (pen.)	Report		Stadium: Bramall Lane; Attendance: 15,680; Referee: Graham Scott

27 January 2018	Newport County (4)	1–1	Tottenham Hotspur (1)	Newport
17:30 GMT	Amond 38'	Report	Kane 82'	Stadium: Rodney Parade; Attendance: 9,836; Referee: Roger East

7 February 2018 Replay	Tottenham Hotspur (1)	2–0	Newport County (4)	Wembley, London
20:00 GMT	Butler 26' (o.g.); Lamela 34'	Report		Stadium: Wembley Stadium; Attendance: 38,947; Referee: Stuart Attwell

27 January 2018	Liverpool (1)	2–3	West Bromwich Albion (1)	Liverpool
19:45 GMT	Firmino 5' (penalty missed) 27'; Salah 78'	Report	Rodriguez 7', 11'; Matip 45+2' (o.g.)	Stadium: Anfield; Attendance: 53,342; Referee: Craig Pawson

28 January 2018	Chelsea (1)	3–0	Newcastle United (1)	Fulham, London
13:30 GMT	Batshuayi 31', 44'; Alonso 72'	Report		Stadium: Stamford Bridge; Attendance: 41,049; Referee: Kevin Friend

28 January 2018	Cardiff City (2)	0–2	Manchester City (1)	Cardiff
16:00 GMT		Report	De Bruyne 8'; Sterling 37'	Stadium: Cardiff City Stadium; Attendance: 32,339; Referee: Lee Mason

== Fifth round proper ==
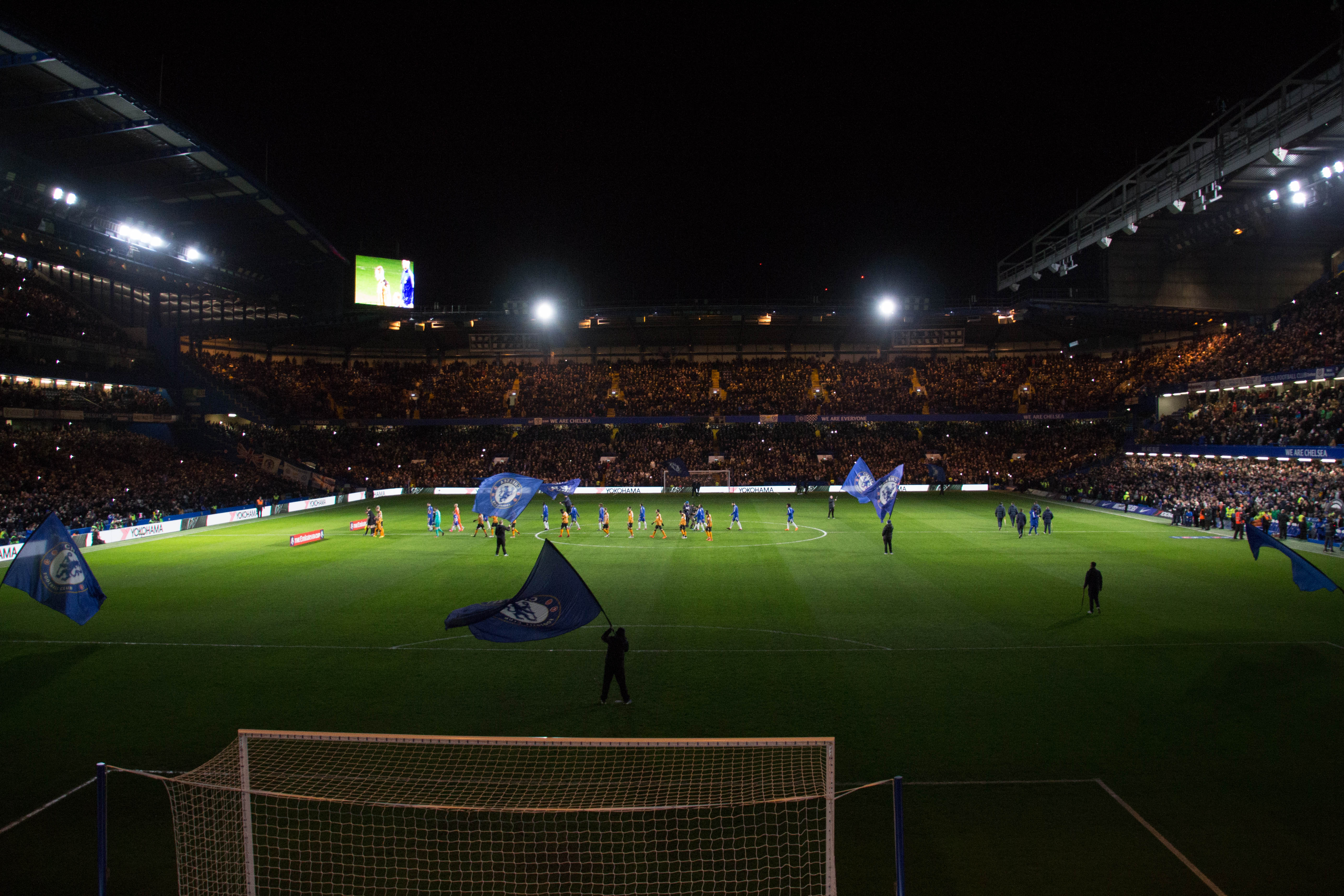
Chelsea hosting Hull City in an FA Cup fifth-round match at Stamford Bridge.

The draw for the fifth round proper took place on 29 January 2018 at 19:20 GMT and was broadcast live on BBC One. This round included one team from Level 4 still in the competition, Coventry City, who were the lowest-ranked team in this round.

16 February 2018	Leicester City (1)	1–0	Sheffield United (2)	Leicester
19:45 GMT	Vardy 66'	Report		Stadium: King Power Stadium; Attendance: 28,366; Referee: Lee Mason

16 February 2018	Chelsea (1)	4–0	Hull City (2)	Fulham, London
20:00 GMT	Willian 2', 32'; Pedro 27'; Giroud 42'	Report		Stadium: Stamford Bridge; Attendance: 39,591; Referee: Andre Marriner

17 February 2018	Sheffield Wednesday (2)	0–0	Swansea City (1)	Sheffield
12:30 GMT		Report		Stadium: Hillsborough Stadium; Attendance: 19,427; Referee: Paul Tierney

27 February 2018 Replay	Swansea City (1)	2–0	Sheffield Wednesday (2)	Swansea
19:45 GMT	J. Ayew 55'; Dyer 80'	Report		Stadium: Liberty Stadium; Attendance: 8,198; Referee: Stuart Attwell

17 February 2018	West Bromwich Albion (1)	1–2	Southampton (1)	West Bromwich
15:00 GMT	Rondón 58'	Report	Hoedt 11'; Tadić 56'	Stadium: The Hawthorns; Attendance: 17,600; Referee: Chris Kavanagh

17 February 2018	Brighton & Hove Albion (1)	3–1	Coventry City (4)	Falmer, Brighton and Hove
15:00 GMT	Locadia 15'; Goldson 34'; Ulloa 61'	Report	Clarke-Harris 77'	Stadium: Falmer Stadium; Attendance: 26,966; Referee: Craig Pawson

17 February 2018	Huddersfield Town (1)	0–2	Manchester United (1)	Huddersfield
17:30 GMT		Report	Lukaku 3', 55'	Stadium: Kirklees Stadium; Attendance: 17,861; Referee: Kevin Friend

18 February 2018	Rochdale (3)	2–2	Tottenham Hotspur (1)	Rochdale
16:00 GMT	Henderson 45'; Davies 90+3'	Report	Lucas 59'; Kane 88' (pen.)	Stadium: Spotland Stadium; Attendance: 8,480; Referee: Bobby Madley

28 February 2018 Replay	Tottenham Hotspur (1)	6–1	Rochdale (3)	Wembley, London
19:45 GMT	Son 23', 65'; Llorente 47', 53', 59'; Walker-Peters 90+3'	Report	Humphrys 31'	Stadium: Wembley Stadium; Attendance: 24,627; Referee: Paul Tierney

19 February 2018	Wigan Athletic (3)	1–0	Manchester City (1)	Wigan
19:55 GMT	Grigg 79'	Report		Stadium: DW Stadium; Attendance: 19,242; Referee: Anthony Taylor

== Quarter-finals ==
The draw for the quarter-finals took place on 17 February 2018 at 20:00 GMT and was broadcast live on BT Sport, the BBC Sport website and app, and BBC Radio 5 Live. This round included one team from Level 3 still in the competition, Wigan Athletic, who were the lowest-ranked team in this round.

There were no replays in the FA Cup quarter-finals, following a rule change introduced for the previous tournament. If a match was level after 90 minutes, 30 minutes of extra time were played. If the score had still been level, the tie would have been decided by a penalty shoot-out.

17 March 2018	Swansea City (1)	0–3	Tottenham Hotspur (1)	Swansea
12:15 GMT		Report	Eriksen 11', 62'; Lamela 45+1'	Stadium: Liberty Stadium; Attendance: 17,498; Referee: Kevin Friend

17 March 2018	Manchester United (1)	2–0	Brighton & Hove Albion (1)	Old Trafford, Greater Manchester
19:45 GMT	Lukaku 37'; Matić 83'	Report		Stadium: Old Trafford; Attendance: 74,241; Referee: Andre Marriner

18 March 2018	Wigan Athletic (3)	0–2	Southampton (1)	Wigan
13:30 GMT		Report	Højbjerg 62'; Cédric 90+1'	Stadium: DW Stadium; Attendance: 17,110; Referee: Michael Oliver

18 March 2018	Leicester City (1)	1–2 (a.e.t.)	Chelsea (1)	Leicester
16:30 GMT	Vardy 76'	Report	Morata 42'; Pedro 105'	Stadium: King Power Stadium; Attendance: 31,792; Referee: Craig Pawson

== Semi-finals ==
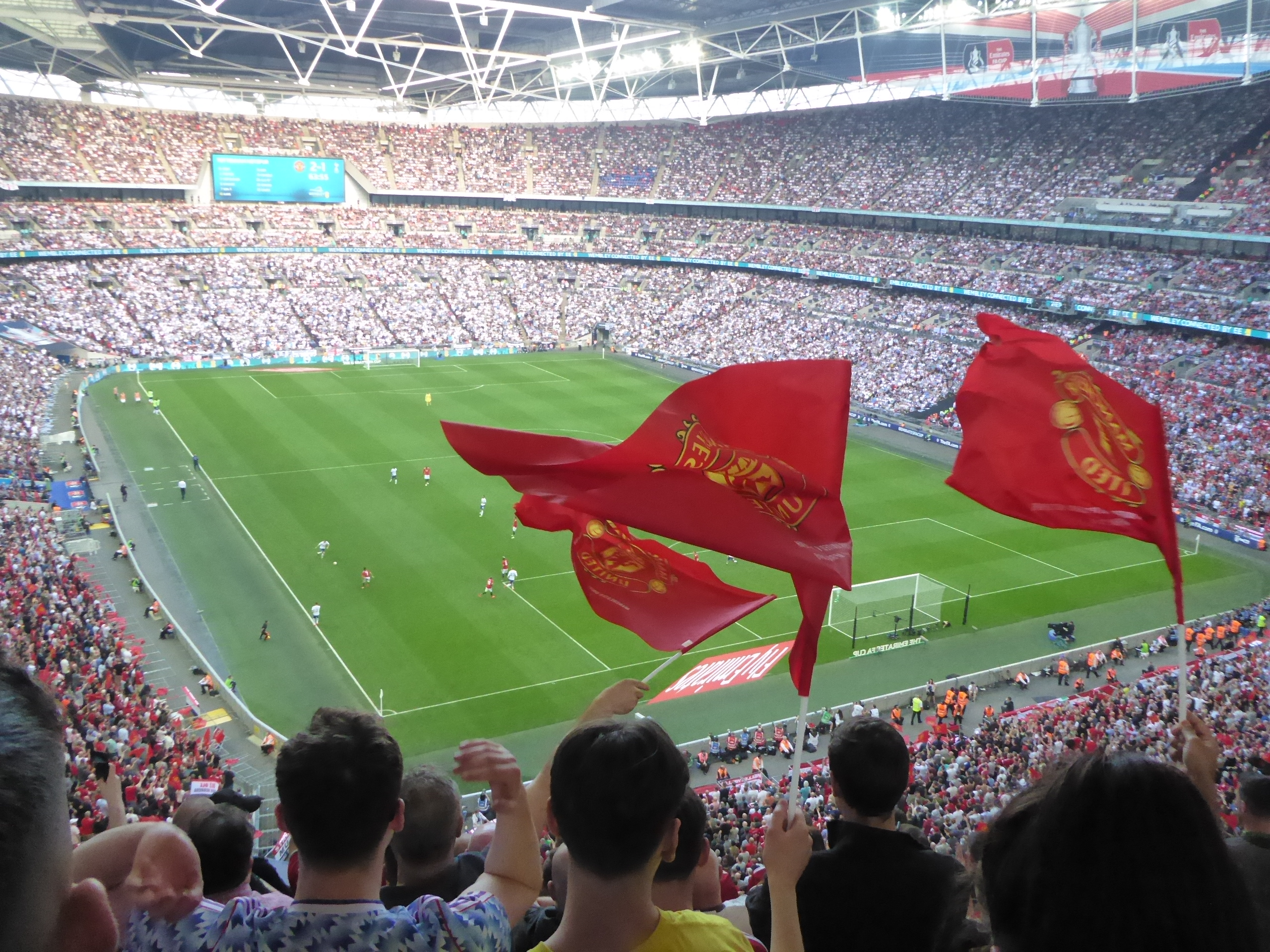
The first of the 2017-18 FA Cup semi-finals, Manchester United vs Tottenham, at Wembley Stadium.

The draw for the semi-finals took place on 18 March 2018, after the conclusion of the quarter-final match between Leicester City and Chelsea. The draw was conducted by Gianfranco Zola and Petr Čech. The semi-finals were played on Saturday 21 April and Sunday 22 April 2018 at Wembley Stadium. Although semi-final participants Tottenham Hotspur were using Wembley as their home ground during the construction of their new stadium, it was designated as a neutral venue for their tie.

21 April 2018	Manchester United (1)	2–1	Tottenham Hotspur (1)	Wembley, London
17:15 BST	Sánchez 24'; Herrera 62'	Report	Alli 11'	Stadium: Wembley Stadium; Attendance: 84,667; Referee: Anthony Taylor

22 April 2018	Chelsea (1)	2–0	Southampton (1)	Wembley, London
15:00 BST	Giroud 46'; Morata 82'	Report		Stadium: Wembley Stadium; Attendance: 73,416; Referee: Martin Atkinson

== Final ==
19 May 2018
17:15 BST

Chelsea	1–0	Manchester United
Hazard 22' (pen.)	Reports

Wembley Stadium, London
Attendance: 87,647
Referee: Michael Oliver (Northumberland)

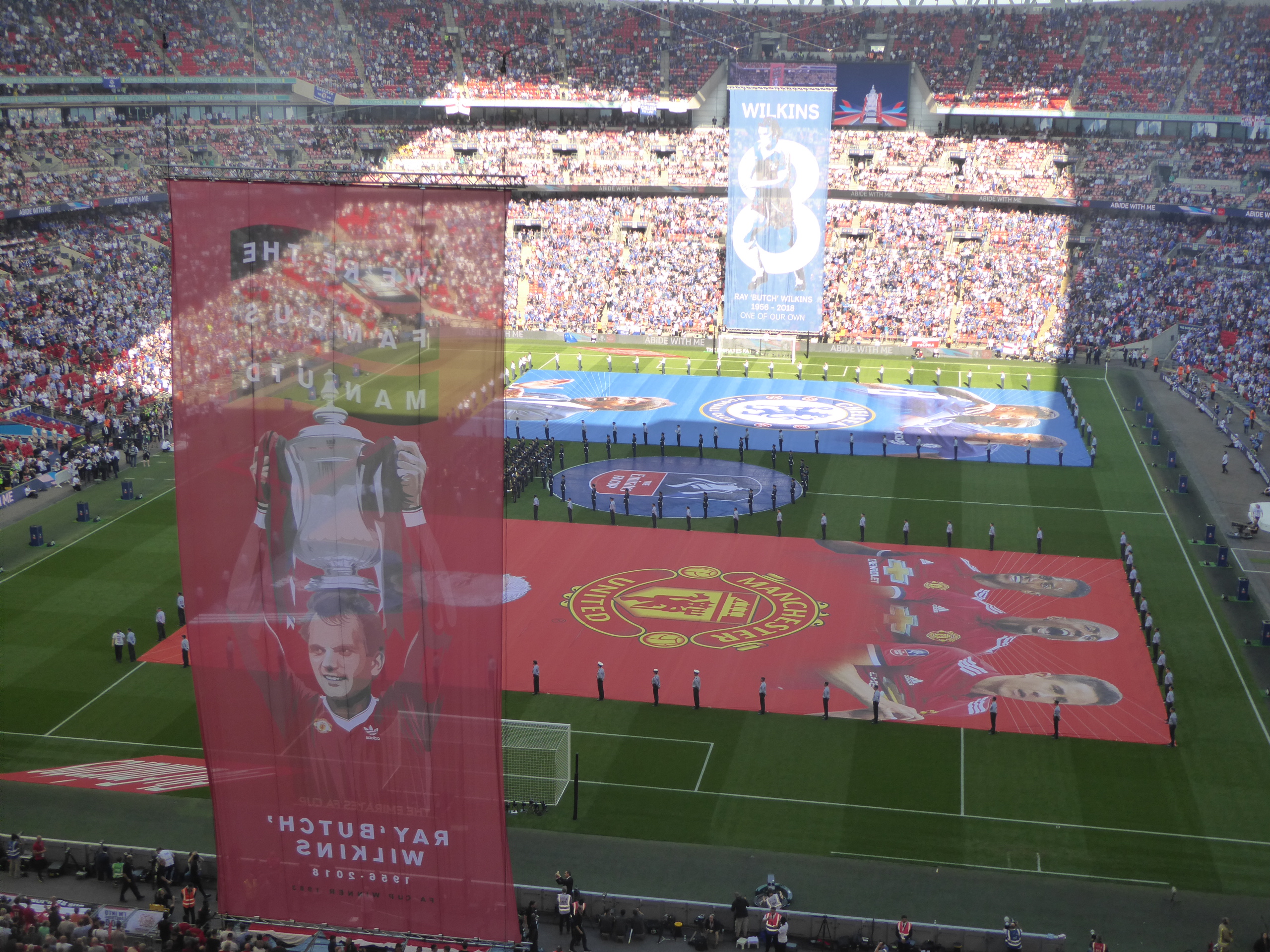
The 2018 FA Cup final.

== Top goalscorers ==
Rank	Player	Club	Goals
1	(Northern Ireland) Will Grigg	Wigan Athletic	7
2	(England) Ian Henderson	Rochdale	6
3	(Belgium) Romelu Lukaku	Manchester United	5
3	(England) Jack Marriott	Peterborough United	5
3	(England) Jayden Stockley	Exeter City	5

== Broadcasting rights ==
The domestic broadcasting rights for the competition were held by the BBC and subscription channel BT Sport. The BBC held the rights since 2014–15, while BT Sport since 2013–14. The FA Cup Final was required to be broadcast live on UK terrestrial television under the Ofcom code of protected sporting events.

The following matches were broadcast live on UK television:

Round	Date	Teams	Kick-off	Channels	
Round	Date	Teams	Kick-off	Digital	TV
First round	3 November	Hyde United v Milton Keynes Dons	7:55pm	BBC iPlayer	BBC Two
First round	4 November	Shaw Lane v Mansfield Town	12:30pm	BT Sport App	BT Sport 1
First round	4 November	Newport County v Walsall	5:15pm	S4C Clic	S4C
First round	6 November	Chorley v Fleetwood Town	7:45pm	BT Sport App	BT Sport 1
First round (Replay)	20 November	Tranmere Rovers v Peterborough United	7:45pm	BT Sport App	BT Sport 1
First round (Replay)	21 November	Billericay Town v Leatherhead	7:45pm	BT Sport App	BT Sport 1
Second round	1 December	AFC Fylde v Wigan Athletic	7:55pm	BBC iPlayer	BBC Two
Second round	2 December	Notts County v Oxford City	12:30pm	BT Sport App	BT Sport 1
Second round	4 December	Slough Town v Rochdale	7:45pm	BT Sport App	BT Sport 1
Second round (Replay)	14 December	Hereford v Fleetwood Town	7:45pm	BT Sport App	BT Sport 1
Third round	5 January	Liverpool v Everton	7:55pm	BBC iPlayer	BBC One
Third round	6 January	Fleetwood Town v Leicester City	12:45pm	BBC iPlayer	BBC One
Third round	6 January	Norwich City v Chelsea	5:30pm	BT Sport App	BT Sport 1
Third round	7 January	Newport County v Leeds United	12:00pm	BBC iPlayer	BBC One Wales
Third round	7 January	Shrewsbury Town v West Ham United	2:00pm	BBC iPlayer	BBC One
Third round	7 January	Nottingham Forest v Arsenal	4:00pm	BT Sport App	BT Sport 1
Third round	8 January	Brighton & Hove Albion v Crystal Palace	7:45pm	BT Sport App	BT Sport 1
Third round (Replay)	16 January	Leicester City v Fleetwood Town	8:00pm	BT Sport App	BT Sport 2
Third round (Replay)	17 January	Chelsea v Norwich City	7:45pm	BBC iPlayer	BBC One
Fourth round	26 January	Yeovil Town v Manchester United	7:55pm	BBC iPlayer	BBC One
Fourth round	27 January	Peterborough United v Leicester City	12:30pm	BT Sport App	BT Sport 2
Fourth round	27 January	Newport County v Tottenham Hotspur	5:30pm	BT Sport App	BT Sport 2
Fourth round	27 January	Liverpool v West Bromwich Albion	7:45pm	BT Sport App	BT Sport 2
Fourth round	28 January	Chelsea v Newcastle United	1:30pm	BT Sport App	BT Sport 2
Fourth round	28 January	Cardiff City v Manchester City	4:00pm	BBC iPlayer	BBC One
Fourth round (Replay)	6 February	Swansea City v Notts County	8:05pm	BBC iPlayer	BBC One
Fourth round (Replay)	7 February	Tottenham Hotspur v Newport County	7:45pm	BT Sport App	BT Sport 2
Fifth round	16 February	Chelsea v Hull City	8:00pm	BT Sport App	BT Sport 2
Fifth round	17 February	Sheffield Wednesday v Swansea City	12:30pm	BT Sport App	BT Sport 2
Fifth round	17 February	Huddersfield Town v Manchester United	5:30pm	BT Sport App	BT Sport 2
Fifth round	18 February	Rochdale v Tottenham Hotspur	4:00pm	BBC iPlayer	BBC One
Fifth round	19 February	Wigan Athletic v Manchester City	7:55pm	BBC iPlayer	BBC One
Fifth round (Replay)	27 February	Swansea City v Sheffield Wednesday	8:05pm	BBC iPlayer	BBC One
Fifth round (Replay)	28 February	Tottenham Hotspur v Rochdale	7:45pm	BT Sport App	BT Sport 2
Quarter-finals	17 March	Swansea City v Tottenham Hotspur	12:15pm	BT Sport App	BT Sport 1
Quarter-finals	17 March	Manchester United v Brighton & Hove Albion	7:45pm	BT Sport App	BT Sport 1
Quarter-finals	18 March	Wigan Athletic v Southampton	1:30pm	BBC iPlayer	BBC One
Quarter-finals	18 March	Leicester City v Chelsea	4:30pm	BBC iPlayer	BBC One
Semi-finals	21 April	Manchester United v Tottenham Hotspur	5:15pm	BBC iPlayer	BBC One
Semi-finals	22 April	Chelsea v Southampton	3:00pm	BT Sport App	BT Sport 1
Final	19 May	Chelsea v Manchester United	5:15pm	BBC iPlayer	BBC One
Final	19 May	Chelsea v Manchester United	5:15pm	BT Sport App	BT Sport 2
