= Northern Lights (football team) =

- Full name: Northern Lights
- Ground: Allen Hill Stadium
- Manager: Shane Verma
- League: National Women's League
- Website: http://www.nff.org.nz/northernlights

Northern Lights is a women's football team representing the Northern Football Federation in New Zealand. They currently play in the National Women's League, the top level of women's football in New Zealand. The team was previously known as Northern Football, until they were re-branded in 2018

== History ==
Originally known as Northern Football, the team made their debut in the National Women's League in 2010-11, qualifying for the playoffs unbeaten, but losing 10–1 to Waikato-Bay of Plenty in the semi-final. The team have won the New Zealand Championship three times, firstly in 2011-12, beating Waikato-Bay of Plenty in the play off final 3–0, and then again the following season, this time going undefeated and beating Auckland Football 2–0 in the final. They were unable to make it a hat trick of championships in 2013 however, losing 4–2 to Mainland Pride in the final, despite topping the regular season table. In 2014 the team failed to make the playoffs, finishing sixth in the regular season, winning only two of their seven games. They then won their third title in the 2015, finishing second after the regular season, they went on to beat the NZ Development Squad 4–3 in the semi-final before going on to beat first place Mainland Pride in the final 3–4 away from home, denying their opponents a three-peat of competition titles.

On 28 August 2018, it was decided that the women's teams from Northern Football Federation would be re-branded as the Northern Lights to provide an identity for the teams, players, staff and supporters and to help build on the growth of the Female game within the region.

== Final Appearances ==
- 2011: Northern Football* vs Waikato-Bay of Plenty (3-0)
- 2012: Northern Football* vs Auckland Football Federation (2-0)
- 2013: Northern Football* vs Mainland Pride (2-4)
- 2015: Northern Football vs Mainland Pride* (4–3)
- 2018: Canterbury United Pride* v Northern Lights (3–2)

*Home team for final.
