= Hāwera FC =

- Full name: Hāwera Football Club
- Founded: 1906
- Ground: Turuturu Park, Hāwera, New Zealand
- League: Taranaki Championship
- 2026: Taranaki Championship, 3rd of 7
- Website: www.sporty.co.nz/hawerafootball

Hāwera FC are a New Zealand association football club based in Hāwera, in the South Taranaki region of the North Island. The club competes in the Taranaki Championship. Its home ground is Turuturu Park.

The Hāwera Association Football Club was founded in April 1906.

Hāwera won the original Taranaki Championship and Julian Cup five times, in 1908, 1922, 1923, in 1931 shared the title with Albion AFC and 1937.

Hāwera entered the Chatham Cup for the first time in 1950 and were knocked out in the first ever Taranaki preliminary final. In 1951 Hāwera were knocked out in the Taranaki preliminary rounds by Overseas Football Club (New Plymouth). Hawera didn't enter the cup again until 1989. In 1990 the club reached the third round of the competition for the first time, its best result to date. Its last appearance in the Chatham Cup was in 2009.

The club first joined the Central League Division Three in 1991. With the introduction of the Central League Premier Division in 1992, and restructuring of the league, Hāwera FC were placed in Central League Division Two where the club remained until withdrawing from the competition at the completion of the 1995 season.

== Honours ==
Taranaki Championship – Julian Cup – 1908, 1922, 1923, 1931 (shared), 1937, 1980.

Taranaki Premiership – 1998, 2001.

Duff Rose Bowl – 1936, 1996, 2002, 2015.

Central Football Federation Cup – 2015 Champions
