= Nathaniel Mendez-Laing =

English footballer (born 1992)

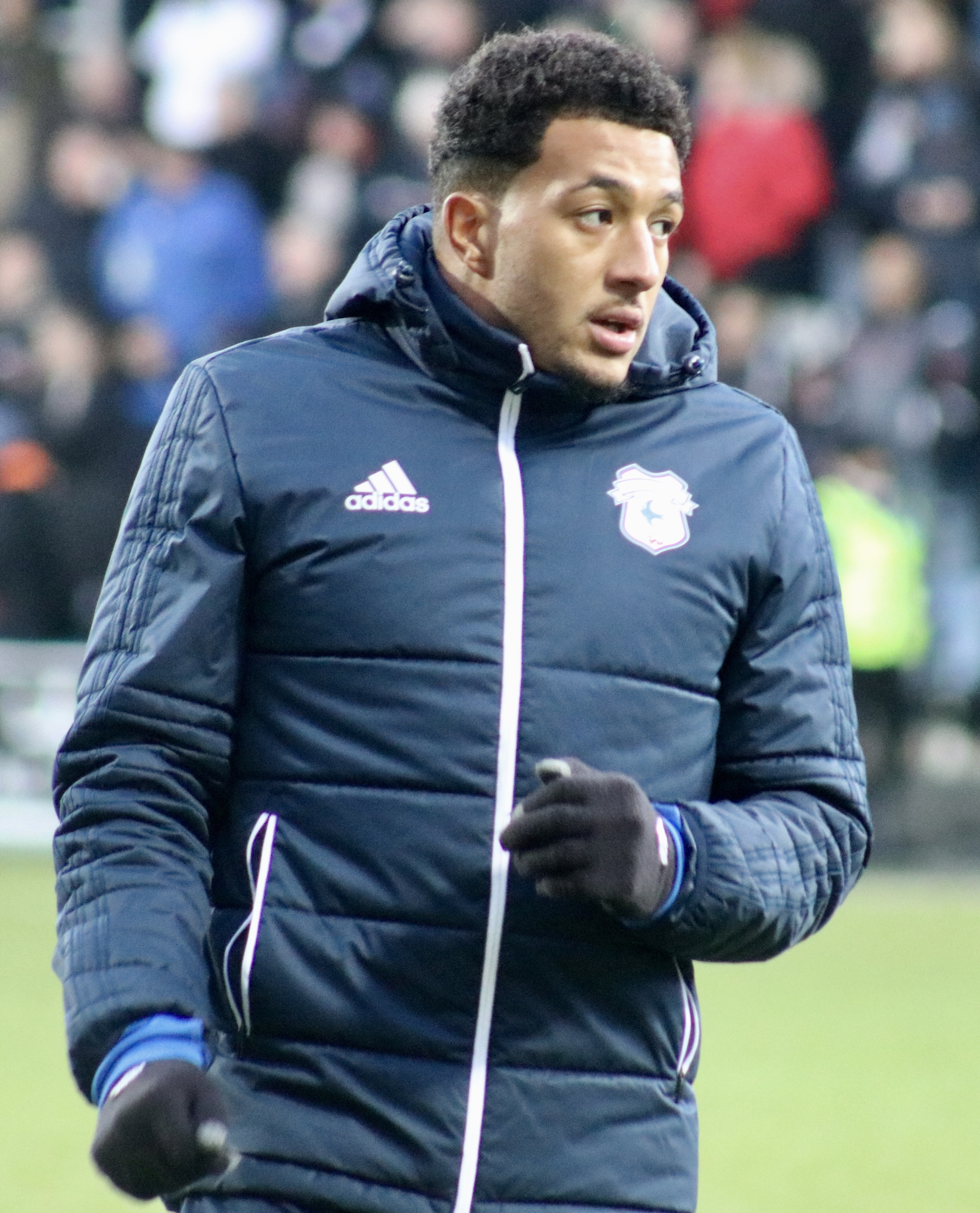
- Mendez-Laing training with Cardiff City in 2018

Personal information
- Full name: Nathaniel Otis Mendez-Laing
- Date of birth: 15 April 1992 (age 34)
- Place of birth: Birmingham, England
- Height: 1.80 m (5 ft 11 in)
- Position: Winger

Youth career
- –2009: Wolverhampton Wanderers

Senior career*
Years	Team	Apps	(Gls)
2009–2012	Wolverhampton Wanderers	0	(0)
2010–2011	→ Peterborough United (loan)	33	(5)
2011	→ Sheffield United (loan)	8	(1)
2012–2015	Peterborough United	51	(4)
2012	→ Portsmouth (loan)	8	(0)
2014	→ Shrewsbury Town (loan)	6	(0)
2015	→ Cambridge United (loan)	11	(1)
2015–2017	Rochdale	72	(15)
2017–2020	Cardiff City	85	(14)
2021	Middlesbrough	9	(1)
2021–2022	Sheffield Wednesday	18	(2)
2022–2025	Derby County	131	(19)
2025–2026	Milton Keynes Dons	26	(9)

International career^{‡}
2008	England U16	2	(0)
2008	England U17	7	(0)
2023–2025	Guatemala	19	(0)
- * Club domestic league appearances and goals as of 23 August 2026 (UTC) ‡ National team caps and goals as of 23:59, 5 September 2025

Nathaniel Otis Méndez-Laing (born 15 April 1992) is a professional footballer who plays as a winger. Born and raised in England to a Jamaican father and a Belizean mother of Guatemalan descent, he plays for the Guatemala national team at international level.

Born in Birmingham, he began his career with Wolverhampton Wanderers, making his professional debut in 2009 at the age of nineteen. However, after loan spells with Peterborough United and Sheffield United, he left the club, joining Peterborough on a permanent deal in 2012.

He made 60 appearances for Peterborough, spending time on loan with Portsmouth, Shrewsbury Town and Cambridge United, before joining Rochdale where he made 83 appearances during a two-year spell. In 2017, he joined Cardiff City, where he helped the side win promotion to the Premier League in his first season. In November 2020, his contract was terminated by the club for drug abuse after 92 appearances for the club.

In February 2021, he joined Middlesbrough, but was released by the club in May 2021. In November 2021, after a trial he joined Sheffield Wednesday, but left the club in June 2022, after rejecting a contract offer. In July 2022, he signed with Derby County and in his second season with the club, he helped the side win promotion to the Championship, he was also named the League One Team of the Season for the 2023–24 season. In the summer of 2025, Mendez-Laing signed for Milton Keynes Dons, after he played 145 times in three years at Derby.

Mendez-Laing has also represented England at under-16 and under-17 level, before declaring for Guatemala in 2023.

== Club career ==
=== Wolverhampton Wanderers ===
Born in Birmingham, West Midlands to a Jamaican father and a Belizean mother of Guatemalan descent, Mendez-Laing is a product of the Wolverhampton Wanderers academy. Having represented England at under-16 and under-17 level, he made his senior debut for Wolves on 25 August 2009 in a League Cup victory over Swindon Town and was named Man of the Match for his performance at the age of seventeen. He subsequently signed his first professional contract with the club in March 2010.

Mendez-Laing joined League One side Peterborough United on loan for the 2010–11 season on 1 July 2010. He made his debut for the club on the opening day of the 2010–11 season, starting in a 3–0 victory over Bristol Rovers. He made forty appearances in total, scoring five times, during the season as Peterborough made the play-offs, where they won promotion back to the Championship at the first attempt. During the close season, between June and August, it was confirmed that a fee had been agreed to permanently transfer Mendez-Laing to Peterborough, around £250,000. However, the move collapsed when personal terms could not be agreed.

Instead of moving back to Peterborough, Mendez-Laing moved on loan to League One side Sheffield United in a deal to run until 3 January 2012, making his début for the Blades a few days later, in the first found of the League Cup against Hartlepool United. He played regularly until picking up an injury at the end of September which sidelined him for a number of weeks. Having returned to his parent club for rehabilitation he then sustained another injury whilst warming up for his first game back at Bramall Lane which was to keep him out for the remainder of his loan spell, thus he returned to the Midlands having made eleven appearances and scoring one goal in his time at United.

=== Peterborough United ===
In July 2012, Mendez-Laing revived his move to former loan club Peterborough United, a deal that he had turned down the previous summer. He signed a three-year contract after the clubs agreed an undisclosed fee. He later commented on his departure from Wolves, stating that he chose to accept Peterborough's second offer as he "wanted to go and play" but believed he was given the wrong guidance. His Peterborough debut was delayed after he sustained a hamstring injury, which was expected to rule him out for between four and six weeks. He returned from injury on 15 September 2012 and scored his first goal for Peterborough on his debut in a 5–2 away defeat to Burnley. In November of that year Mendez-Laing was suspended and placed on the transfer list after a public-order offence in Peterborough town centre with teammates Gabriel Zakuani, Emile Sinclair and Tyrone Barnett, with manager Darren Ferguson announcing that Mendez-Laing subsequently had no future at the club.

On 15 November 2012, Mendez-Laing signed on a one-month loan for Portsmouth, making his debut, on 17 November 2012, in a 1–0 loss against Doncaster Rovers. After the match, Mendez-Laing spoke about his debut, saying Portsmouth could reap the benefits of reviving his career. After making four appearances, Mendez-Laing's loan spell at Portsmouth was extended until the start of January. After five further appearances however, Mendez-Laing returned to Peterborough.

Following his return from Portsmouth, Mendez-Laing made an appearance for Peterborough as a substitute in a 2–1 loss against Nottingham Forest. Soon after, manager Darren Ferguson explained his apparent change of heart regarding Mendez-Laing, saying that he (Ferguson) had now forgiven him, commenting "I don't bear grudges. Mendez-Laing is back at the club and it's now up to me and the coaching staff to get the best out of him as a player. He clearly has ability, but he must also now knuckle down and do all he can to help this team." His return saw him gain more playing time in the first team and he scored his second Peterborough goal, in a 5–1 win over Millwall on 19 February 2013. He scored his third goal in the last game of the season, a 3–2 loss against Crystal Palace, that confirmed Peterborough's relegation.

Ahead of the 2013–14 season, Mendez-Laing switched shirt number from 44 to 19. However, at the start of the season, he was left out for the first four matches at the start of the season and drew criticism from Ferguson over his fitness levels: "Mendez didn't come back to the club anywhere near fit enough." His first appearance of the 2013–14 season came on 24 August 2013 where he came on as a substitute for Lee Tomlin in the 74th minute during a 5–0 victory over Tranmere Rovers. His fitness concerns continued, resulting him being an unused substitute for four matches, although he scored a hat-trick for the club's reserve side in a 4–0 win over Thresham College. After this, Mendez-Laing returned to the first team and scored his first league goal of the season, in a 1–0 win over Shrewsbury Town on 19 October 2013.

On 30 January 2014, Mendez-Laing was sent out on loan to Shrewsbury Town on a short-term deal. He made his Shrewsbury debut two days later, coming on as a substitute for Bahrudin Atajić in the 59th minute of a 1–1 draw against Brentford. His loan spell at Shrewsbury was extended for another month despite suffering a slight hamstring injury that kept him out for a week. However, he suffered another injury, resulting his loan spell with Shrewsbury coming to an end by the end of March. After his return to Peterborough, Mendez-Laing returned to the first team and featured for the last three remaining games of the season, including a match against Shrewsbury Town, the team he played during the season, where he provided an assist for Josh McQuoid, who scored in a 4–2 win, resulting in Shrewsbury's relegation on 26 April 2014.

In the 2014–15 season, Mendez-Laing received praise from his manager Ferguson who stated "I've got a responsibility to manage him and get the best out of him. We feel we're there with that." His turnaround resulted in him featuring in the first team at the start of the season, providing an assist for Kenny McEvoy in a 3–2 win over Milton Keynes Dons on 16 August 2014. However, he suffered a thigh injury that kept him out until October. He made his first team return on 21 October 2014, coming on as a substitute for Ricardo Santos in the 74th minute, in a 1–0 loss against Crewe Alexandra. By the end of January, Mendez-Laing was told by the club that he could leave the club to find first team regular after he turned down two loan moves.

On 18 February 2015, Mendez-Laing was loaned to League Two side Cambridge United for the remainder of the 2014–15 season. He made an impact on his Cambridge debut when he scored his first goal for the club, though Cambridge United lost 6–2 to Portsmouth. He went on to make twenty-two appearances for the club before returning to his parent club at the end of the season. At the end of the 2014–15 season, he was released by Peterborough after spending three years there.

=== Rochdale ===
On 27 August 2015, Mendez-Laing joined League One side Rochdale on a one-year deal, making his debut as a substitute in place of Matty Lund during a 1–0 defeat to Burton Albion on 12 September 2015. Following his arrival, Rochdale manager Keith Hill stated his belief that he could "revive" Mendez-Laing's career, commenting "I personally don't think he has ever been fit enough to maintain and showcase his ability for 90 minutes." However, he did not make his first league start until October 2015, when mounting injuries saw him named in the starting line-up for a 3–2 defeat to Sheffield United. A month later, Mendez-Laing scored his first goals for the club with a hat-trick in a 3–1 victory over Swindon Town in the second round of the FA Cup. He scored his first league goal three weeks later during a 2–1 victory over Port Vale. He helped Rochdale to a mid-table finish, ending the season with a goal in their last match, a 2–1 victory over relegated Colchester United. Having scored 10 goals in 36 appearances, at the end of the season, Rochdale activated their one-year extension option on his contract to extend his stay at the club.

In his second season with Rochdale, Mendez-Laing started the campaign as an established player in the first team and scored his first goal of the season in a 3–1 victory over Chesterfield in the EFL Cup. He scored his first league goals of the season in October 2016, netting in back-to-back victories over Southend United and Bury. He reached double figures for both goals and assists, including scoring six goals in the final two months of the season, as Rochdale narrowly missed out on a spot in the play-offs by four points. With his contract due to expire, leaving him available on a free transfer, he became a transfer target for several Championship and League One sides following his performances for Rochdale.

=== Cardiff City ===
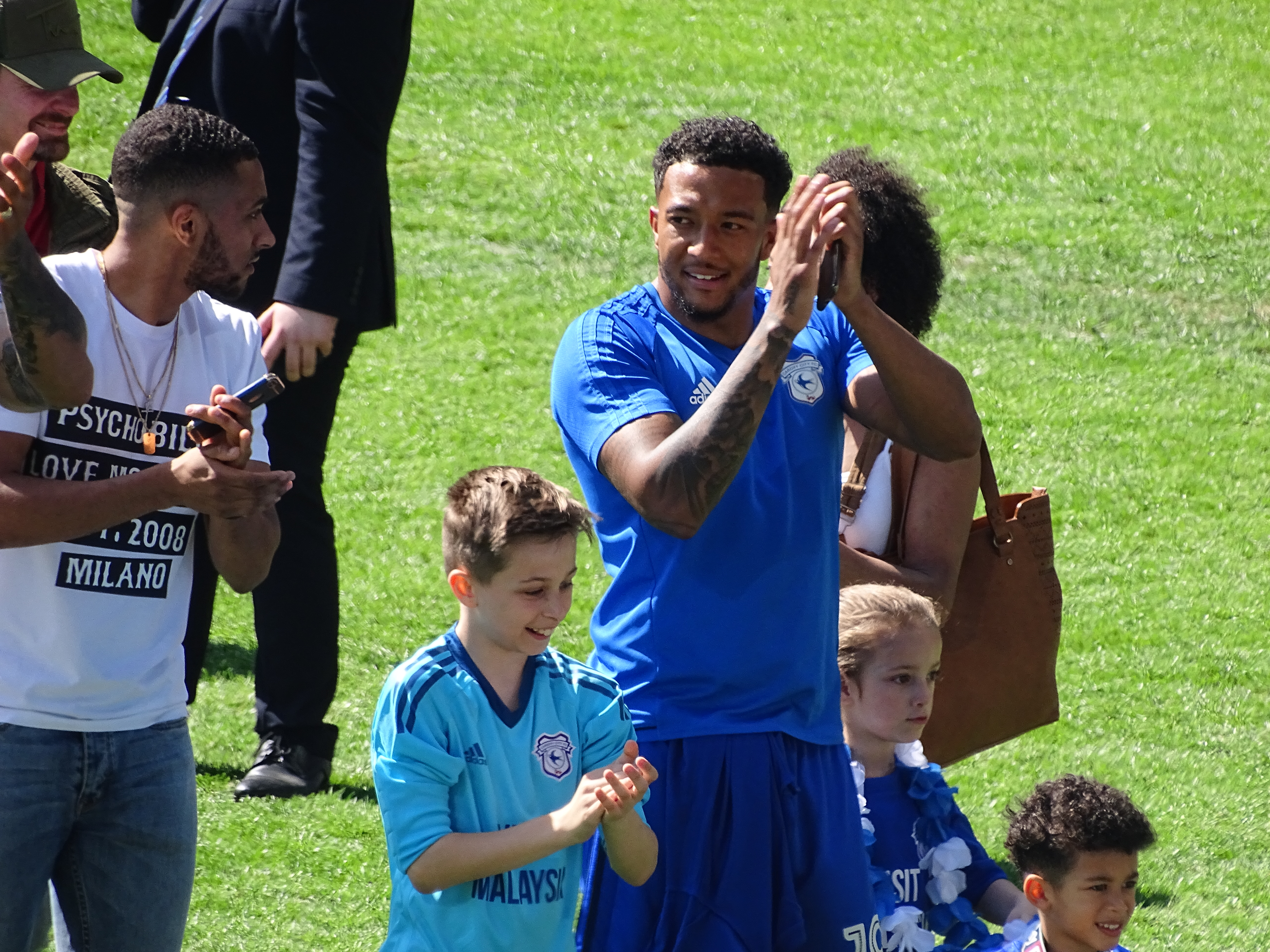
Nathaniel Mendez-Laing clapping following Cardiff City's promotion to the Premier League in 2018.

On 30 May 2017, Mendez-Laing agreed to join Championship side Cardiff City on a free transfer after turning down a new contract at Rochdale. He had been set to join a rival Championship club, with a deal due to be concluded later the same day, but was convinced to move by Cardiff manager Neil Warnock. He made his debut for the club on the opening day of the 2017–18 season during a 1–0 victory over Burton Albion, as a substitute in place of Bruno Ecuele Manga. He scored his first goal for the Bluebirds on 8 August, scoring in a 2–1 win over Portsmouth in the EFL Cup. Mendez-Laing was named August Player of the Month, following a further four goals, helping Cardiff to win their opening five league matches for the first time in their history. However, after a dip in form later in the season coupled with a month out through injury after being substituted within the first ten minutes of a Severnside derby, Cardiff manager Neil Warnock revealed that Mendez-Laing had been wrongly prescribed medication for his asthma that had affected his performances. In his first season with Cardiff, he made 42 appearances in all competitions, helping the side win promotion to the Premier League after finishing the season as runners-up.

Mendez-Laing was awarded a contract extension until 2021 during the summer. He made his first career appearance in the Premier League on the opening day of the 2018–19 season, starting in a 2–0 defeat to Bournemouth. Two games later, he suffered a knee injury following a collision with Huddersfield Town goalkeeper, Ben Hamer, which ruled him out for up to three months. He made his return in a 3–1 loss at West Ham United on 4 December, before starting the following game against Southampton. He scored his first Premier League goal on 29 January 2019, in a 2–1 loss against Arsenal. He scored twice in a 0–2 away win against Manchester United on 12 May 2019.

On 9 September 2020, Mendez-Laing's contract with Cardiff City was terminated, following an alleged breach of contract. It was later revealed that this was due to a positive drugs test, having been banned for three months for cocaine usage.

=== Middlesbrough ===
On 1 February 2021, Mendez-Laing joined fellow Championship side Middlesbrough, reuniting with Neil Warnock, his former manager at Cardiff City. Twelve days later, he made his debut for Boro as a substitute for Duncan Watmore in a 2–1 league defeat against Derby County. He scored his first goal for Middlesbrough in a 3–0 win over Stoke City on 13 March 2021.

On 28 May 2021, it was announced that he would leave Middlesbrough at the end of the season, following the expiry of his contract.

=== Sheffield Wednesday ===
On 22 November 2021, Mendez-Laing joined League One club Sheffield Wednesday, after spending time with the club on trial. He would make his first appearance for the club, coming off the bench against Wycombe Wanderers on 27 November 2021. His first goal for the club would come against Plymouth Argyle in EFL League One on 15 January 2022. A few days after his first goal for the club, it was reported that his contract would run out after their upcoming game against Oxford United. Following the end of the season, Mendez-Laing was offered a new contract by the Owls. On 22 June 2022, it was confirmed that he had rejected his new contract and would leave the club.

=== Derby County ===
On 2 July 2022, he joined Derby County on a two-year deal. He scored his first goal for Derby in a win against Barnsley on 13 August 2022. He would alternate as a winger and wing-back in the 2022–23 season and scored 8 goals in 51 games.

In the 2023–24 season, Mendez-Laing had a streak of three League One goals in as many games in a seven days as he scored against Exeter City on 24 October, Stevenage on 28 October and Northampton Town on 31 October 2023. Mendez-Laing scored seven goals and made ten assists in his first 28 games of the season and this was rewarded with a new two-and-a-half-year contract which was announced on 8 January 2024, extending his stay at Derby until June 2026. After assisting Tom Barkhuizen in Derby's 3–0 win at Bristol Rovers on 9 March 2024, Mendez-Laing broke Derby's record for league assists in a season with his 15th of the season, exceeding the record set by Craig Bryson of 14 league assists set in the 2013–14 season. These performances saw Mendez-Laing receive a nomination for League One Player of the Year in the EFL Awards, he was named in the League One Team of the Year in the same awards for the 2023–24 season. Mendez-Laing also had a spell captaining the at the team the end of the season and he scored in his 100th appearance for the club, in a 1–0 win at Cambridge United, a result which left Derby on the verge of promotion to the Championship, which was confirmed a week later. Mendez-Laing received a nomination for 2023–24 League One player of the season. Mendez-Laing played in all of Derby's 46 league matches during the season, scoring nine times and assisting a further 15 times.

Mendez-Laing became Derby's permanent captain for the 2024–25 season, with head coach Paul Warne stating he will keep the armband as long as he keeps up his performance level. Mendez-Laing lost the captaincy to midfielder Ebou Adams in February 2025 under new head coach John Eustace. Mendez-Laing received criticism from some Derby fans for his performances in the 2024–25 season as it was perceived that he struggled with the step up to Championship football. He scored three times for Derby during the season, with his goal in a 3–1 win over West Bromwich Albion on 21 April 2025 seen as a highlight, as during the end of the season he was mainly used as an impact substitute as Derby managed to survive relegation.

Mendez-Laing scored 21 times across 145 appearances between signing terms for Derby County in 2022 and leaving the club in May 2025.

=== Milton Keynes Dons ===
On 27 May 2025, despite having a full year left of his contract, it was reported that Derby County allowed Mendez-Laing to drop two divisions to join League Two side Milton Keynes Dons on a free transfer, reuniting with former Derby Head Coach Paul Warne. He made his debut for the club on 2 August 2025, the opening day of the 2025–26 season, in a 0–0 home draw with Oldham Athletic.

On 11 December 2025, Mendez-Laing was voted the PFA Fan's League Two Player of the Month for November after scoring in three consecutive games. A week later, he suffered a hamstring injury during the first half of a 1–1 draw with Cambridge United which required surgery and ruled him out for several months. Mendez-Laing made his return from injury on 28 March 2026, featuring in a 1–0 defeat away to Salford City.

Despite missing several months of the season due to injury, he made 25 league appearances and scored 9 goals across a campaign in which the club achieved a second-placed promotion to League One.

On 9 October 2026, Mendez-Laing agreed to terminate his contract with MK Dons by mutual consent.

== International career ==
Mendez-Laing has represented England at under-16 and under-17 level.

In June 2023 Mendez-Laing was named to Guatemala's preliminary squad for the 2023 CONCACAF Gold Cup. He was confirmed as part of the final squad on 15 June. On 28 June he made his international debut, starting in Guatemala's 2023 CONCACAF Gold Cup group D clash with Cuba at the DRV PNK Stadium in Miami, Florida. On 48 minutes Mendez-Laing played a through ball to substitute Darwin Lom who scored the game's only goal. Mendez-Laing picked up another assist in Guatemala's Gold Cup Group match with Guadeloupe, helping Guatemala to a 3–2 win and qualifying for the quarter-finals top of Group D.

Mendez-Laing was named to Guatemala's squad for the 2023-24 CONCACAF Nations League. During their match against Trinidad and Tobago, he assisted Rubio Rubin's 12th-minute goal.

== Personal life ==
In September 2026, Mendez-Laing was charged with assault by beating after his wife Saira had allegedly been hit over the head and suffered injuries to her arm following an argument over a phone.

== Career statistics ==
=== Club ===
As of 15 August 2026

Appearances and goals by club, season and competition
Club	Season	League			FA Cup		League Cup		Other		Total	
Club	Season	Division	Apps	Goals	Apps	Goals	Apps	Goals	Apps	Goals	Apps	Goals
Wolverhampton Wanderers	2009–10	Premier League	0	0	0	0	1	0	—		1	0
Peterborough United (loan)	2010–11	League One	33	5	3	0	2	0	2 (Note: One appearance in the Football League Trophy and one in the League One play-offs)	0	40	5
Sheffield United (loan)	2011–12	League One	8	1	0	0	1	0	2 (Note: Appearances in the Football League Trophy)	0	11	1
Peterborough United	2012–13	Championship	21	3	0	0	0	0	—		21	3
Peterborough United	2013–14	League One	16	1	2	1	2	0	3	1	23	3
Peterborough United	2014–15	League One	14	0	1	0	1	0	0	0	16	0
Peterborough United	Total		51	4	3	1	3	0	3	1	60	6
Portsmouth (loan)	2012–13	League One	8	0	0	0	0	0	—		8	0
Shrewsbury Town (loan)	2013–14	League One	6	0	—		—		—		6	0
Cambridge United (loan)	2014–15	League Two	11	1	0	0	0	0	0	0	11	1
Rochdale	2015–16	League One	33	7	1	3	0	0	2	0	36	10
Rochdale	2016–17	League One	39	8	4	1	2	1	4 (Note: Appearances in the EFL Trophy)	0	49	10
Rochdale	Total		72	15	5	4	2	1	6	0	85	20
Cardiff City	2017–18	Championship	38	6	2	0	2	1	0	0	42	7
Cardiff City	2018–19	Premier League	20	4	1	0	0	0	0	0	21	4
Cardiff City	2019–20	Championship	27	3	0	0	0	0	2 (Note: Appearances in the Championship play-offs)	0	29	3
Cardiff City	2020–21	Championship	0	0	0	0	0	0	0	0	0	0
Cardiff City	Total		85	13	3	0	2	1	2	0	92	14
Middlesbrough	2020–21	Championship	9	1	0	0	0	0	0	0	9	1
Sheffield Wednesday	2021–22	League One	18	2	0	0	0	0	1 (Note: Appearance(s) in League One Play-offs)	0	19	2
Derby County	2022–23	League One	44	7	3	0	2	0	2	1	51	8
Derby County	2023–24	League One	46	9	1	1	0	0	3	0	50	10
Derby County	2024–25	Championship	41	3	1	0	2	0	0	0	44	3
Derby County	Total		131	19	5	1	4	0	5	1	145	21
Milton Keynes Dons	2025–26	League Two	25	9	2	1	0	0	0	0	27	10
Milton Keynes Dons	2026–27	League One	1	0	0	0	1	0	0	0	2	0
Milton Keynes Dons	Total		26	9	2	1	1	0	0	0	29	10
Career Total			458	70	21	7	16	2	21	2	516	81

=== International ===
As of 5 September 2025

Appearances and goals by national team and year
National team	Year	Apps	Goals
Guatemala	2023	8	0
Guatemala	2024	7	0
Guatemala	2025	4	0
Total		19	0

== Honours ==
Peterborough

- Football League One play-offs: 2011
- Football League Trophy: 2013–14

Milton Keynes Dons

- EFL League Two runner-up: 2025–26

Individual

- EFL Championship Player of the Month: August 2017
- EFL League One Team of the Season: 2023–24
- PFA Fans' League One Player of the Month: February 2024
- PFA Fans' League Two Player of the Month: November 2025
