= 2016–17 Rochdale A.F.C. season =

English football club season

Rochdale A.F.C.
2016–17 season
- Chairman: Chris Dunphy
- Manager: Keith Hill
- Stadium: Spotland Stadium
- League One: 9th
- FA Cup: Fourth round
- EFL Cup: Second round
- EFL Trophy: Second round
- Top goalscorer: League: Ian Henderson (15); All: Ian Henderson (19)
Home colours	Away colours	Third colours

The 2016–17 season was Rochdale A.F.C.'s 110th in existence and their third consecutive season in League One. Along with competing in League One, the club participated in the FA Cup, League Cup and Football League Trophy.

The season covers the period from 1 July 2016 to 30 June 2017.

== Statistics ==
No.	Pos	Nat	Player	Total		League One		FA Cup		League Cup		League Trophy	
No.	Pos	Nat	Player	Apps	Goals	Apps	Goals	Apps	Goals	Apps	Goals	Apps	Goals
1	GK	(England) ENG	Josh Lillis	19	0	14+0	0	1+0	0	1+0	0	3+0	0
2	DF	(Republic of Ireland) IRL	Joe Rafferty	50	0	36+4	0	5+0	0	2+0	0	3+0	0
3	DF	(England) ENG	Scott Tanser	9	0	5+0	0	0+1	0	0+0	0	3+0	0
4	DF	(England) ENG	Jimmy McNulty	44	0	33+2	0	3+2	0	2+0	0	2+0	0
5	DF	(Republic of Ireland) IRL	Niall Canavan	33	2	23+2	2	2+1	0	2+0	0	3+0	0
6	DF	(England) ENG	Harrison McGahey	47	0	30+6	0	4+1	0	2+0	0	4+0	0
7	MF	(England) ENG	Peter Vincenti	16	1	3+11	1	1+0	0	0+0	0	1+0	0
8	MF	(Northern Ireland) NIR	Matty Lund	35	10	27+2	9	3+0	0	1+0	1	2+0	0
9	FW	(England) ENG	Calvin Andrew	43	7	31+8	7	2+0	0	1+1	0	0+0	0
10	MF	(Northern Ireland) NIR	Callum Camps	51	9	37+7	8	5+0	1	0+0	0	2+0	0
11	MF	(England) ENG	Nathaniel Mendez-Laing	49	10	30+9	8	2+2	1	0+2	1	1+3	0
12	MF	(Republic of Ireland) IRL	Donal McDermott	21	1	9+8	1	0+1	0	2+0	0	0+1	0
13	GK	(England) ENG	Ben Wilson	8	0	8+0	0	0+0	0	0+0	0	0+0	0
14	MF	(England) ENG	Oliver Rathbone	33	2	18+9	2	3+1	0	0+0	0	1+1	0
15	MF	(England) ENG	Joe Thompson	27	4	17+4	4	2+0	0	1+1	0	2+0	0
16	FW	(England) ENG	Reuben Noble-Lazarus	16	1	3+7	0	2+1	0	0+0	0	3+0	1
17	FW	(England) ENG	James Hooper	0	0	0+0	0	0+0	0	0+0	0	0+0	0
18	DF	(Republic of Ireland) IRL	Keith Keane	32	9	27+2	9	3+0	0	0+0	0	0+0	0
19	FW	(England) ENG	Steve Davies	37	4	16+13	0	4+0	3	0+1	0	0+3	1
20	DF	(Republic of Ireland) IRL	Brian Barry-Murphy	1	0	0+0	0	0+0	0	0+0	0	0+1	0
21	GK	(England) ENG	Johny Diba	0	0	0+0	0	0+0	0	0+0	0	0+0	0
22	FW	(England) ENG	Jack Redshaw	2	0	0+1	0	0+1	0	0+0	0	0+0	0
23	GK	(England) ENG	Steve Collis	0	0	0+0	0	0+0	0	0+0	0	0+0	0
24	DF	(England) ENG	Jamie Allen	37	2	26+5	2	1+1	0	2+0	0	1+1	0
25	GK	(Republic of Ireland) IRL	Conrad Logan	30	0	24+0	0	4+0	0	1+0	0	1+0	0
26	MF	(England) ENG	David Owusu	1	0	0+1	0	0+0	0	0+0	0	0+0	0
27	MF	(England) ENG	Andy Cannon	31	3	14+10	2	2+1	0	2+0	1	2+0	0
28	MF	(England) ENG	Aaron Morley	6	0	2+0	0	0+1	0	0+0	0	3+0	0
29	FW	(England) ENG	Sanmi Odelusi	19	1	1+14	0	0+0	0	1+0	0	2+1	1
30	DF	(England) ENG	Joel Taylor	1	0	1+0	0	0+0	0	0+0	0	0+0	0
32	DF	(England) ENG	Mark Kitching	6	0	4+1	0	0+1	0	0+0	0	0+0	0
36	FW	(England) ENG	Matty Gillam	1	1	0+0	0	0+0	0	0+0	0	1+0	1
39	FW	(England) ENG	Joe Bunney	36	1	28+1	1	3+0	0	0+1	0	2+1	0
40	MF	(England) ENG	Ian Henderson	49	19	39+3	15	3+0	2	2+0	1	2+0	1
45	DF	(England) ENG	Andrew Hollins	0	0	0+0	0	0+0	0	0+0	0	0+0	0
46	MF	(England) ENG	Neil Kengni-Kuemo	0	0	0+0	0	0+0	0	0+0	0	0+0	0
48	MF	(England) ENG	Jack Stewart	0	0	0+0	0	0+0	0	0+0	0	0+0	0

== Transfers ==
=== In ===
Date from	Position	Nationality	Name	From	Fee	Ref.
1 July 2016	CB	(Republic of Ireland)	Niall Canavan	Scunthorpe United	Free transfer	
1 July 2016	CB	(England)	Harrison McGahey	Sheffield United	Free transfer	
1 July 2016	AM	(England)	Oliver Rathbone	Manchester United	Free transfer	
7 August 2016	RM	(England)	Joe Thompson	Carlisle United	Free transfer	
10 August 2016	GK	(Republic of Ireland)	Conrad Logan	Hibernian	Free transfer	
17 August 2016	CF	(England)	Steve Davies	Bradford City	Free transfer	
3 January 2017	DM	(Republic of Ireland)	Keith Keane	Cambridge United	Free transfer	
31 January 2017	LB	(England)	Mark Kitching	Middlesbrough	Undisclosed	

=== Out ===
Date from	Position	Nationality	Name	To	Fee	Ref.
1 July 2016	SS	(England)	Lewis Alessandra	Hartlepool United	Free transfer	
1 July 2016	CF	(England)	Nyal Bell	Gateshead	Released	(Note: Following Bell's release, he signed for Gateshead.)
1 July 2016	CB	(England)	Rhys Bennett	Mansfield Town	Released	(Note: Following Bennett's release, he signed for Mansfield Town.)
1 July 2016	CB	(England)	Ashley Eastham	Fleetwood Town	Free transfer	
1 July 2016	LB	(England)	Tom Kennedy	Free agent	Mutual consent	
1 July 2016	CB	(England)	Olly Lancashire	Shrewsbury Town	Free transfer	
1 July 2016	CF	(England)	Billy Hasler-Cregg	Altrincham	Released	(Note: Following Hasler-Cregg's release, he signed for Altrincham.)
1 July 2016	CF	(England)	Grant Holt	Hibernian	Released	(Note: Following Holt's release, he signed for Hibernian.)
1 July 2016	CF	(England)	Joel Logan	Guiseley	Released	(Note: Following Logan's release, he signed for Guiseley.)
1 July 2016	LB	(England)	Michael Rose	Morecambe	Released	(Note: Following Rose's release, he signed for Morecambe.)
1 July 2016	CM	(England)	Dave Syers	Free agent	Released	
27 January 2017	LB	(England)	Scott Tanser	Port Vale	Mutual consent	
30 January 2017	MF	(England)	James Hooper	Carlisle United	Mutual consent	(Note: Following Hooper's departure, he joined Carlisle United.)

=== Loans in ===
Date from	Position	Nationality	Name	From	Date until	Ref.
25 July 2016	LW	(England)	Sanmi Odelusi	Wigan Athletic	20 January 2017	(Note: On 20 January 2017, Sanmi Odelusi's season-long loan was terminated.)
31 August 2016	CM	(Republic of Ireland)	Keith Keane	Cambridge United	3 January 2017	
20 January 2017	CF	(England)	Jack Redshaw	Blackpool	End of Season	
25 January 2017	LB	(England)	Joel Taylor	Stoke City	End of Season	
27 January 2017	LB	(England)	Mark Kitching	Middlesbrough	31 January 2017	(Note: On 31 January 2017, Mark Kitching's loan was made permanent.)
30 January 2017	GK	(England)	Ben Wilson	Cardiff City	End of Season	

=== Loans out ===
Date from	Position	Nationality	Name	To	Date until	Ref.
2 September 2016	GK	(England)	Johny Diba	FC United of Manchester	30 September 2016	
9 September 2016	CF	(England)	Matty Gillam	Stalybridge Celtic	11 October 2016	
9 September 2016	MF	(England)	James Hooper	FC United of Manchester	7 October 2016	
19 October 2016	MF	(England)	James Hooper	Stockport County	16 November 2016	

== Competitions ==
=== Pre-season friendlies ===
12 July 2016 Friendly	AFC Fylde	1–2	Rochdale	Medlar-with-Wesham
19:30	Gilchrist 66'	Report	Eccleston 25'; Henderson 51'	Stadium: Mill Farm

16 July 2016 Friendly	Curzon Ashton	1–3	Rochdale	Ashton-under-Lyne
15:00	Ennis 54'	Report	Mendez-Laing 12', 72'; Bunney 19'	Stadium: Tameside Stadium

19 July 2016 Friendly	Rochdale	1–1	Blackburn Rovers	Rochdale
19:45	McDermott 64'	Report	Graham 11'	Stadium: Spotland Stadium

23 July 2016 Friendly	Rochdale	4–1	Wigan Athletic	Rochdale
15:00	Noble-Lazarus 26'; Mendez-Laing 31'; Canavan 79'; Andrew 82'	Report	Wildschut 77'	Stadium: Spotland Stadium; Attendance: 5,084 (2,729 away)

26 July 2016 Friendly	Macclesfield Town	2–0	Rochdale	Macclesfield
19:00	Whitaker 17'; Holroyd 36'	Report		Stadium: Moss Rose

30 July 2016 Friendly	FC United of Manchester	0–3	Rochdale	Moston
15:00		Report	Odelusi 9'; Tanser 24'; Cannon 65'	Stadium: Broadhurst Park

=== League One ===
==== League table ====
Pos	Team	Pld	W	D	L	GF	GA	GD	Pts
7	Southend United	46	20	12	14	70	53	+17	72
8	Oxford United	46	20	9	17	65	52	+13	69
9	Rochdale	46	19	12	15	71	62	+9	69
10	Bristol Rovers	46	18	12	16	68	70	−2	66
11	Peterborough United	46	17	11	18	62	62	0	62

Source: BBC Sport
Rules for classification: 1) Points; 2) Goal difference; 3) Number of goals scored

==== Results by matchday ====
Matchday	1	2	3	4	5	6	7	8	9	10	11	12	13	14	15	16	17	18	19	20	21	22	23	24	25	26	27	28	29	30	31	32	33	34	35	36	37	38	39	40	41	42	43	44	45	46
Ground	H	A	A	H	H	A	A	H	A	H	A	H	H	A	A	H	A	H	H	A	H	A	H	H	A	A	H	H	A	A	H	A	H	A	A	H	H	A	A	H	H	A	A	H	A	H
Result	L	D	L	L	D	L	D	W	W	W	W	W	W	L	L	W	L	W	W	L	W	W	W	W	W	L	L	D	D	L	D	L	D	D	L	W	D	W	L	D	W	L	W	W	D	D
Position		16	21	22	23	24	24	23	19	15	11	6	4	5	9	6	10	7	5	5	5	5	4	4	4	5	6	7	7	9	8	10	11	11	13	10	10	8	9	10	8	9	8	9	8	9

Source: 11v11.com
A = Away; H = Home; W = Win; D = Draw; L = Loss

==== Matches ====
6 August 2016 1	Rochdale	2–3	Peterborough United	Rochdale
15:00 BST	Cannon 8'; Henderson 32' (pen.)	Report	Forrester 21', 37'; Baldwin (yellow card) 45+2'; Edwards 89'	Stadium: Spotland Stadium; Attendance: 3,243 (718 visiting)

13 August 2016 2	Sheffield United	1–1	Rochdale	Sheffield
15:00 BST	Fleck (yellow card) 23'; Sharp 81'	Report	McDermott (yellow card) 35'; Cannon 43'	Stadium: Bramall Lane; Attendance: 19,399; Referee: Kevin Johnson

16 August 2016 3	Port Vale	1–0	Rochdale	Burslem
19:45 BST	Grant (yellow card) 18'; Smith 52'; Streete (yellow card) 80'	Report	Cannon (yellow card) 17'; McNulty (yellow card) 72'; Canavan (yellow card) 90+5'	Stadium: Vale Park; Attendance: 3491; Referee: Robert Jones

20 August 2016 4	Rochdale	0–1	Milton Keynes Dons	Rochdale
15:00 BST	McGahey (yellow card) 50'; Lund (yellow card) 70'	Report	Upson (yellow card) 48'; Wootton 90+5'	Stadium: Spotland Stadium; Referee: Carl Boyeson

27 August 2016 5	Rochdale	1–1	AFC Wimbledon	Rochdale
15:00 BST	Camps (yellow card) 82' (yellow-red card) 82'; Mendez-Laing (yellow card) 90+4'; Allen 90+6'	Report	Robinson (yellow card) 9'; Barcham (yellow card) 12'; Meades (yellow card) 30'; Francomb (yellow card) 85'; Reeves (yellow card) 90+3'	Stadium: Spotland Stadium; Attendance: 2274; Referee: Christopher Sarginson

3 September 2016 6	Oxford United	1–0	Rochdale	Oxford
15:00 BST	Maguire (yellow card) 27'; Raglan (yellow card) 42'; Sercombe 88'	Report	Mendez-Laing (yellow card) 49'	Stadium: Kassam Stadium; Attendance: 6,939; Referee: Brendan Malone

10 September 2016 7	Bristol Rovers	2–2	Rochdale	Bristol
15:00 BST	Taylor 21', 49'; Lines (yellow card) 56'; Harrison (yellow card) 70'	Report	Camps 17'; Henderson 22'; Vincenti (yellow card) 42'; Allen (yellow card) 47'; Canavan (yellow card) 49' (yellow-red card) 72'; McNulty (yellow card) 90+4'	Stadium: Memorial Stadium; Attendance: 8057; Referee: Ross Joyce

17 September 2016 8	Rochdale	2–1	Fleetwood Town	Rochdale
15:00 BST	Lund 10' (yellow card) 70'; McGahey (yellow card) 23'; Davies 85'; Bunney (yellow card) 88'	Report	McLaughlin (yellow card) 19'; Grant 23' (pen.); Neal (yellow card) 58'; Woolford (yellow card) 81'	Stadium: Spotland Stadium; Attendance: 2499; Referee: Mark Heywood

24 September 2016 9	Millwall	2–3	Rochdale	South Bermondsey, London
15:00 BST	O'Brien 11'; Gregory 18' (pen.); Thompson (yellow card) 61' (yellow-red card) 73'; Webster (yellow card) 69'; Craig (yellow card) 74'; Abdou (yellow card) 86'; Williams (yellow card) 87'	Report	Camps 9'; Canavan (yellow card) 19'; Bunney (yellow card) 45+3'; Andrew 67' (yellow card) 85'; Henderson 90+3' (pen.)	Stadium: The Den; Attendance: 8143; Referee: John Brooks

27 September 2016 10	Rochdale	1–0	Bolton Wanderers	Rochdale
19:45 BST	Lund (yellow card) 32'; Davies 52'	Report	Taylor (yellow card) 61'	Stadium: Spotland Stadium; Attendance: 6,011; Referee: David Coote

1 October 2016 11	Charlton Athletic	0–1	Rochdale	Charlton, London
15:00 BST	Jackson (penalty missed); Lookman (yellow card) 90+3'	Report	Andrew 25'; Lund (yellow card) 40'	Stadium: The Valley; Attendance: 14,460; Referee: Robert Jones

8 October 2016 12	Rochdale	3–0	Southend United	Rochdale
15:00 BST	Canavan 18'; Andrew 27'; Mendez-Laing 83'	Report	Inniss (yellow card) 60'; O'Neill (yellow card) 75'	Stadium: Crown Oil Arena; Attendance: 2,600; Referee: Darren England

15 October 2016 13	Rochdale	2–0	Bury	Rochdale
15:00 BST	Henderson 38' (pen.); Mendez-Laing 74'; Andrew (yellow card) 79'; Bunney (yellow card) 79'	Report	Maher (yellow card) 17'; Mellis (yellow card) 39' (yellow-red card) 87'; Soares (yellow card) 43'; Vaughan (yellow card) 66'; Bryan (red card) 77'; Miller (yellow card) 79'; Kay (yellow card) 80'	Stadium: Crown Oil Arena; Attendance: 5,344; Referee: Peter Bankes

18 October 2016 14	Swindon Town	3–0	Rochdale	Swindon
19:45 BST	Furlong 24' (yellow card) 72'; Delfouneso 32' (yellow card) 45+2'; Thompson 80'	Report	Henderson (penalty missed) 47'; Keane (yellow card) 48'; Andrew (yellow card) 52'; Bunney (red card) 72'; Camps (yellow card) 77'; Cannon (yellow card) 79'	Stadium: County Ground; Attendance: 6,048; Referee: Gavin Ward

22 October 2016 15	Coventry City	2–0	Rochdale	Coventry
15:00 BST	Agyei 28'; Turnbull (yellow card) 38'; Wright 84'	Report	Lund (yellow card) 66'	Stadium: City of Coventry Stadium; Attendance: 8,133; Referee: Richard Clark

29 October 2016 16	Rochdale	1–0	Oldham Athletic	Rochdale
15:00 BST	Lund 40'	Report	Burgess (yellow card) 15'; Dummigan (yellow card) 65'; McLaughlin (yellow card) 90+4'	Stadium: Crown Oil Arena; Attendance: 5,204; Referee: Tony Harrington

12 November 2016 17	Bradford City	4–0	Rochdale	Bradford
15:00 GMT	Clarke 41'; Dieng 44'; Vincelot (yellow card) 55'; Hanson 59'; Marshall 63'	Report	Canavan (yellow card) 19' (yellow-red card) 58'; Bunney (yellow card) 66'; Noble-Lazarus (yellow card) 78'	Stadium: The Coral Windows Stadium; Attendance: 18,205; Referee: Ross Joyce

19 November 2016 18	Rochdale	4–0	Swindon Town	Rochdale
15:00 GMT	Rathbone (yellow card) 22'; Bunney 29' (yellow card) 30'; Lund 55'; Davies 57', 66' (pen.)	Report	Rodgers (yellow card) 25'; Goddard (yellow card) 31'; Raphael Branco (yellow card) 54'	Stadium: Crown Oil Arena; Attendance: 2,196; Referee: Darren Handley

22 November 2016 19	Rochdale	4–0	Walsall	Rochdale
19:45 GMT	Rathbone 32'; Noble-Lazarus 41'; Davies 76' (pen.), 90+1'	Report	Edwards (yellow card) 52'	Stadium: Crown Oil Arena; Attendance: 1,907; Referee: Andy Haines

26 November 2016 20	Gillingham	3–0	Rochdale	Gillingham
15:00 GMT	Nouble 53' (yellow card) 70'; Emmanuel-Thomas 89'; Byrne 90+1' (yellow card) 90+5'	Report	Rafferty (yellow card) 59'	Stadium: MEMS Priestfield Stadium; Attendance: 5,409; Referee: Trevor Kettle

10 December 2016 21	Rochdale	3–2	Scunthorpe United	Rochdale
15:00 GMT	Thompson 41'; Rathbone 53'; Andrew 75'; Henderson (yellow card) 90+1'	Report	Bishop (yellow card) 17' (goal) 84'; Hopper 80'	Stadium: Crown Oil Arena; Attendance: 3,445; Referee: Ben Toner

17 December 2016 22	Northampton Town	2–3	Rochdale	Northampton
15:00 GMT	Taylor 16'; Hoskins 57'	Report	Keane (yellow card) 6'; Lund 19', 63', 67' (yellow card) 40'; Henderson (yellow card) 72'	Stadium: Sixfields Stadium; Attendance: 5,247; Referee: Eddie Ilderton

26 December 2016 23	Rochdale	3–0	Chesterfield	Rochdale
15:00 GMT	Davies (penalty missed) 8'; Henderson (yellow card) 10' (goal) 44', 84'; Andrew 59'; Rathbone (yellow card) 87'	Report	Dimaio (yellow card) 49'	Stadium: Crown Oil Arena; Attendance: 3,863; Referee: Carl Boyeson

30 December 2016 24	Rochdale	2–1	Shrewsbury Town	Rochdale
19:45 GMT	Henderson 4'; Davies 28'	Report	Black (yellow card) 73'; Toney 86'	Stadium: Crown Oil Arena; Attendance: 3,235; Referee: Richard Clark

2 January 2017 25	Walsall	0–2	Rochdale	Walsall
15:00 GMT	Morris (yellow card) 25'; Etheridge (yellow card) 35'	Report	Henderson 23' (yellow card) 52'; Andrew (yellow card) 55'; Keane (yellow card) 57'; Thompson 74'	Stadium: The Banks's Stadium; Attendance: 4,667; Referee: Seb Stockbridge

14 January 2017 26	Southend United	2–1	Rochdale	Southend-on-Sea
15:00 GMT	Fortuné 15'; McGlashan (yellow card) 24' (yellow-red card) 34'; Cox 90+3'	Report	Keane (red card) 22'; Logan (yellow card) 25'; Lund (yellow card) 31'; Andrew 66'; Camps (yellow card) 74'	Stadium: Roots Hall Stadium; Attendance: 6,570; Referee: Rob Lewis

21 January 2017 27	Rochdale	0–4	Oxford United	Rochdale
15:00 GMT		Report	Taylor (yellow card) 12' (goal) 53'; Johnson 18'; Hall 29'; Ledson 73'	Stadium: Crown Oil Arena; Attendance: 3,246; Referee: Robert Jones

4 February 2017 28	Rochdale	0–0	Bristol Rovers	Rochdale
15:00 GMT	McNulty (yellow card) 62'; Camps (yellow card) 64'	Report	Lockyer (yellow card) 32'	Stadium: Spotland Stadium; Attendance: 3,168; Referee: Mark Brown

11 February 2017 29	Fleetwood Town	0–0	Rochdale	Fleetwood
15:00 GMT	Grant (yellow card) 37'; Eastham (yellow card) 76'	Report	Keane (yellow card) 28'; Cannon (yellow card) 85'	Stadium: Highbury Stadium; Attendance: 3,186; Referee: Jeremy Simpson

14 February 2017 30	Bolton Wanderers	1–0	Rochdale	Bolton
20:00 GMT	Morais 82'; Spearing (yellow card) 85'	Report	Kitching (yellow card) 49'; Keane (yellow card) 58'; Vincenti (yellow card) 90'	Stadium: Macron Stadium; Attendance: 13,313; Referee: Chris Kavanagh

18 February 2017 31	Rochdale	3–3	Charlton Athletic	Rochdale
15:00 GMT	Canavan 4'; Keane (yellow card) 34'; Andrew 70'; Mendez-Laing 84'; Rathbone (yellow card) 90+1'; Rafferty (yellow card) 90+4'	Report	Botaka 41'; Teixeira 67', 88'; Magennis (yellow card) 80'; Holmes (yellow card) 90'	Stadium: Crown Oil Arena; Attendance: 2,842; Referee: Scott Duncan

25 February 2017 32	Peterborough United	3–1	Rochdale	Peterborough
15:00 GMT	Lopes (yellow card) 22'; Baldwin 36' (yellow card) 57' (yellow-red card) 80'; Nichols 38'; Taylor 84'	Report	Rafferty (yellow card) 10' (yellow-red card) 45+3'; Thompson 40'; Keane (yellow card) 44'; McDermott (red card) 52'	Stadium: London Road Stadium; Attendance: 4,457; Referee: Chris Sarginson

4 March 2017 33	Rochdale	3–3	Sheffield United	Rochdale
15:00 GMT	Cannon (yellow card) 10'; Davies 20'; Lund 46' (yellow card) 71'; Mendez-Laing 78'	Report	Duffy 5'; Lafferty 11'; Coutts (yellow card) 41'; Sharp 68'	Stadium: Spotland Stadium; Attendance: 6,214; Referee: Seb Stockbridge

11 March 2017 34	Milton Keynes Dons	2–2	Rochdale	Milton Keynes
15:00 GMT	Upson (yellow card) 35'; Agard 70'; Reeves 90+1'	Report	Davies 17'; Cannon (yellow card) 58'; Mendez-Laing 84'	Stadium: Stadium:mk; Attendance: 10,569; Referee: Darren Drysdale

14 March 2017 35	Scunthorpe United	2–1	Rochdale	Scunthorpe
19:45 GMT	Mirfin (yellow card) 17'; Toffolo (yellow card) 24'; Clarke (yellow card) 45+3'; Madden 54'; Crooks 90+3'	Report	Rafferty (yellow card) 32'; Henderson 41' (yellow card) 84'; Camps (yellow card) 85'	Stadium: Glanford Park; Attendance: 3,225; Referee: David Webb

18 March 2017 36	Rochdale	4–1	Gillingham	Rochdale
15:00 GMT	Mendez-Laing 10' (yellow card) 81'; Henderson 33'; Camps 49'; Rathbone (yellow card) 83'; Vincenti 90'	Report	Parker 17'; Rehman (yellow card) 51' (yellow-red card) 59'; Ehmer (yellow card) 74'	Stadium: Spotland Stadium; Attendance: 2,582; Referee: Andy Haines

21 March 2017 37	Rochdale	3–3	Millwall	Rochdale
19:45 GMT	Allen (yellow card) 12'; Mendez-Laing 33'; Vincenti (yellow card) 36'; Henderson 44'; Camps 54'; McNulty (yellow card) 68'	Report	Gregory 14' (pen.); O'Brien 25'; Cooper (yellow card) 43'; Butcher (yellow card) 43'; Craig (yellow card) 53'; Wallace 77'	Stadium: Spotland Stadium; Attendance: 2,334; Referee: Darren England

25 March 2017 38	Chesterfield	1–3	Rochdale	Chesterfield
15:00 GMT	Dennis 51'; Donohue (yellow card) 60'; Anderson (yellow card) 76'; Faupala (red card) 90+6'	Report	Henderson 16'; Camps 40'; Allen 42'	Stadium: Proact Stadium; Attendance: 5,927; Referee: Mark Brown

28 March 2017 39	AFC Wimbledon	3–1	Rochdale	Kingston upon Thames, London
19:45 GMT	Kelly 53'; Taylor 55'; Parrett 58' (pen.)	Report	McNulty (yellow card) 25'; Lund (yellow card) 44'; Keane (red card) 45+1'; Henderson (yellow card) 45+3'; Camps 65'	Stadium: Kingsmeadow; Attendance: 3,812; Referee: Brett Huxtable

1 April 2017 40	Rochdale	1–1	Northampton Town	Rochdale
15:00 GMT	Mendez-Laing 58'; Vincenti (yellow card) 72'	Report	McCourt (yellow card) 45'; Anderson 90+3'	Stadium: Spotland Stadium; Attendance: 2,939; Referee: Ross Joyce

4 April 2017 41	Rochdale	3–0	Port Vale	Rochdale
19:45 GMT	Lund 33'; McDermott 42' (yellow card) 50'; Henderson 45+5' (pen.); Camps (yellow card) 49'; Andrew (yellow card) 60'	Report	Pugh (red card) 20'; Taylor (yellow card) 62'; Bikey (yellow card) 72'	Stadium: Spotland Stadium; Attendance: 4,387; Referee: Ben Toner

8 April 2017 42	Shrewsbury Town	1–0	Rochdale	Shrewsbury
15:00 BST	Payne (yellow card) 2' (goal) 16'	Report	McDermott (yellow card) 43'; Lund (yellow card) 58'	Stadium: New Meadow; Attendance: 5,002; Referee: Kevin Johnson

13 April 2017 43	Bury	0–1	Rochdale	Bury
19:45 BST		Report	Camps 45+1'; McNulty (yellow card) 60'; Rafferty (yellow card) 70'	Stadium: Gigg Lane; Attendance: 4,850; Referee: Darren Bond

17 April 2017 44	Rochdale	2–0	Coventry City	Rochdale
15:00 BST	Henderson 18', 52'; Rafferty (yellow card) 22'	Report	Bigirimana (yellow card) 45'	Stadium: Spotland Stadium; Attendance: 3,202; Referee: Nigel Miller

22 April 2017 45	Oldham Athletic	1–1	Rochdale	Oldham
15:00 BST	Clarke 67'; Fané (yellow card) 88'	Report	Camps 13'; Vincenti (yellow card) 90+4'	Stadium: Boundary Park; Attendance: 6,865; Referee: Kevin Friend

30 April 2017 46	Rochdale	1–1	Bradford City	Rochdale
12:00 BST	Lund 66' (yellow card) 77'	Report	Jones 9'	Stadium: Spotland Stadium; Attendance: 6,876; Referee: Steve Martin

=== FA Cup ===
6 November 2016 First round	Maidstone United	1–1	Rochdale	Maidstone
14:00 GMT	Taylor 21' (pen.); Rogers (yellow card) 45+3'; Mills (yellow card) 69'; Lokko (yellow card) 90+4'	Report	Canavan (yellow card) 20'; Lund (yellow card) 45+3'; Rathbone (yellow card) 59'; Camps 90+4'	Stadium: Gallagher Stadium; Attendance: 2,227; Referee: Charles Breakspear

15 November 2016 First round replay	Rochdale	2–0	Maidstone United	Rochdale
19:45 GMT	Davies 14', 22' (pen.)	Report	Loza (yellow card) 63'; Taylor (yellow card) 87'	Stadium: Crown Oil Arena; Attendance: 1,350; Referee: Nigel Miller

3 December 2016 Second round	Carlisle United	0–2	Rochdale	Carlisle
15:00 GMT		Report	Canavan (yellow card) 35'; Davies 48'; Mendez-Laing 90+3'	Stadium: Brunton Park; Attendance: 4,426; Referee: Mark Haywood

7 January 2017 Third round	Barrow	0–2	Rochdale	Barrow-in-Furness
15:00 GMT	Rowe (yellow card) 39'	Report	Henderson 17', 62'; Rathbone (yellow card) 33'	Stadium: Holker Street; Attendance: 4,414; Referee: David Webb

28 January 2017 Fourth round	Rochdale	0–4	Huddersfield Town	Rochdale
15:00 GMT	McGahey (yellow card) 66'	Report	Quaner 42'; Brown (yellow card) 51' (goal) 66' (pen.); Hefele 72', 84'	Stadium: Spotland Stadium; Attendance: 7,431; Referee: Oliver Langford

=== EFL Cup ===
9 August 2016 First round	Rochdale	3–1	Chesterfield	Rochdale
19:45 BST	Henderson 47'; Cannon 53'; Mendez-Laing 78'	Report	McGinn 30'	Stadium: Spotland Stadium

23 August 2016 Second round	Queens Park Rangers	2–1	Rochdale	Shepherd's Bush, London
19:45 BST	Sandro (yellow card) 29' (goal) 41', 74'	Report	Lund 5' (yellow card) 70'; Rafferty (yellow card) 66'	Stadium: Loftus Road

=== EFL Trophy ===
Pos	Div	Team	Pld	W	PW	PL	L	GF	GA	GD	Pts	Qualification
1	L1	Rochdale	3	2	1	0	0	5	3	+2	8	Advance to Round 2
2	ACA	Sunderland U21	3	2	0	1	0	4	2	+2	7	Advance to Round 2
3	L2	Notts County	3	1	0	0	2	4	5	−1	3	
4	L2	Hartlepool United	3	0	0	0	3	2	5	−3	0	

Source: Sky Sports

6 September 2016 Group stage 1	Rochdale	1–1 (4–2 p)	Sunderland U23	Rochdale
19:45 BST	Henderson 57'	Report	Embleton 51'; Denayer (yellow card) 57'; Nelson (yellow card) 74'	Stadium: Spotland Stadium; Attendance: 1184; Referee: Graham Salisbury
	Penalties
	Davies (penalty scored); Rafferty (penalty scored); Bunney (penalty scored); McGahey (penalty missed); Odelusi (penalty scored)		Honeyman (penalty missed); Kirchhoff (penalty scored); Robson (penalty missed); Greenwood (penalty scored)

4 October 2016 Group stage 2	Rochdale	2–1	Notts County	Rochdale
19:45 BST	Odelusi (yellow card) 60' (goal) 61'; Davies 69'	Report	Forte 25'; Aborah (yellow card) 58'	Stadium: Crown Oil Arena; Attendance: 1,147; Referee: Jeremy Simpson

9 November 2016 Group stage 3	Hartlepool United	1–2	Rochdale	Hartlepool
19:30 GMT	Donnelly (yellow card) 29'; Oates 85'	Report	Noble-Lazarus 21'; Gillam 67'	Stadium: The Northern Gas and Power Stadium; Attendance: 380; Referee: Scott Duncan

6 December 2016 Second round	Rochdale	0–2	Chesterfield	Rochdale
19:30 GMT	McNulty (yellow card) 20' (yellow-red card) 47'; McDermott (yellow card) 72'	Report	Maguire 24'; Donohue (yellow card) 29'; Evans (yellow card) 48' (goal) 59'; Anderson (red card) 66'; Evatt (yellow card) 75'	Stadium: Crown Oil Arena; Referee: Graham Salisbury
