= James Hooper (footballer) =

English footballer (born 1997)

Personal information
- Full name: James Hooper
- Date of birth: 10 February 1997 (age 29)
- Place of birth: Wythenshawe, England
- Height: 1.78 m (5 ft 10 in)

Team information
- Current team: Witton Albion

Youth career
- –2015: Rochdale

Senior career*
Years	Team	Apps	(Gls)
2015–2017	Rochdale	2	(0)
2016	→ FC United of Manchester (loan)	3	(1)
2016	→ Stockport County (loan)	2	(0)
2017	Carlisle United	1	(0)
2017	FC United of Manchester	9	(1)
2017–2018	Radcliffe Borough	37	(19)
2018	Salford City	3	(0)
2018–2019	Chorley	15	(3)
2020	West Didsbury & Chorlton	3	(3)
2020	Altrincham		
2020	Witton Albion (dual reg)	3	(2)
2020–2022	Witton Albion	18	(7)
2022	Atherton Collieries	8	(4)
2022	Workington	5	(2)
2022	Runcorn Linnets	42	(12)
2023	Moreland City	19	(6)
2023–2024	Runcorn Linnets	19	(2)
2024–	Witton Albion	1	(0)
- * Club domestic league appearances and goals as of 12:01, 11 September 2024 (UTC)

James Hooper (born 10 February 1997) is an English semi-professional footballer who plays as a forward for Witton Albion. He appeared in the Football League for Rochdale and Carlisle United.

== Playing career ==
=== Rochdale ===
Hooper turned professional at Rochdale in April 2015. He scored 23 goals at youth team level in the 2014–15 season and was named as youth team Player of the Season, which reportedly attracted interested from Norwich City. He made his debut in the Football League on 24 November, coming on for Donal McDermott 54 minutes into a 2–0 defeat to Gillingham at Priestfield Stadium.

==== Loans to FC United of Manchester and Stockport County ====
During his time at Rochdale he spent time on loan at both FC United and Stockport County.

=== Carlisle United ===
On 14 March 2017, Hooper joined Carlisle United on a short-term deal.

=== FC United of Manchester ===
He then joined FC United.

=== Radcliffe Borough ===
In 2017 he signed for Radcliffe Borough. He finished top goal scorer for Radcliffe in 2018 scoring 17 goals.

=== Salford City ===
In July 2018 after appearing on trial for the club a number of times in pre-season friendlies, he signed on a one-year contract for Salford City.

=== Chorley ===
In November 2018 he moved to Chorley.

=== Radcliffe ===
In September 2019 he moved to Radcliffe.

=== West Didsbury & Chorlton ===
After breaking his collarbone, he joined West Didsbury & Chorlton in January 2020 to regain his fitness, and scored three goals in three games with the club.

=== Altrincham ===
In February 2020 he joined Altrincham on non-contract terms.

=== Witton Albion ===
In February 2020 he joined Witton Albion on dual registration terms and then joined the club on a permanent deal in August 2020.

=== Atherton Collieries ===
In February 2022 he joined Atherton Collieries.

=== Workington ===
On 26 July 2022, Hooper signed for Workington.

=== Runcorn Linnets ===
On 21 September 2022, Hooper signed for Runcorn Linnets.

=== Moreland City ===
On 3 January 2023, Hooper signed for Moreland City.

=== Return to Runcorn ===
In October 2023, Hooper returned to England, rejoining Runcorn Linnets.

=== Return to Witton Albion ===
On 10 September 2024, Hooper returned to Witton Albion.

== Career statistics ==
Season	Club	League			FA Cup		League Cup		Other		Total	
Season	Club	Division	Apps	Goals	Apps	Goals	Apps	Goals	Apps	Goals	Apps	Goals
2015–16	Rochdale	League One	2	0	0	0	0	0	0	0	2	0
2016-17	Carlisle United	League Two	1	0	0	0	0	0	0	0	1	0
2018–19	Salford City	National League	0	0	0	0	0	0	0	0	0	0
Career total			3	0	0	0	0	0	0	0	3	0
