= Joel Taylor (footballer) =

English footballer (born 1996)

Personal information
- Full name: Joel Paul Antonio Taylor
- Date of birth: 24 March 1996 (age 30)
- Place of birth: West Bromwich, England
- Height: 1.78 m (5 ft 10 in)
- Position: Left back

Team information
- Current team: Hednesford Town

Youth career
- 2008–2016: Stoke City

Senior career*
Years	Team	Apps	(Gls)
2016–2017	Stoke City	0	(0)
2017	→ Rochdale (loan)	1	(0)
2017–2019	Kidderminster Harriers	56	(2)
2018	→ Halesowen Town (loan)	4	(0)
2019	→ Halesowen Town (loan)	5	(0)
2019–2020	Chester	37	(0)
2020–2021	Chesterfield	16	(0)
2021–2023	Notts County	22	(1)
2022–2023	→ Dagenham & Redbridge (loan)	7	(0)
2023	Wealdstone	3	(0)
2023–2024	Chester	28	(0)
2024–	Hednesford Town	0	(0)
- * Club domestic league appearances and goals as of 13:18, 29 May 2024 (UTC)

Joel Paul Antonio Taylor (born 24 March 1996) is an English footballer who plays as a left-back for National League North club Hednesford Town.

== Career ==
=== Stoke City ===
Taylor began his career at Stoke City where he progressed through their Academy and signed a professional contract in 2014. Taylor joined League One side Rochdale on loan in January 2017. He made his Football League debut on 4 February 2017 against Bristol Rovers. He was released by Stoke at the end of the 2016–17 season.

=== Kidderminster ===
Taylor joined Kidderminster Harriers in June 2017. On 4 December 2018, Taylor was loaned out to Halesowen Town until 5 January 2019. The deal was later extended for one month further. He returned to Kidderminster on 8 February 2019.

=== Chester ===
On 21 May 2019, Chester confirmed the signing of Taylor on a one-year deal.

=== Chesterfield ===
On 8 December 2020, Taylor joined Chesterfield for an undisclosed fee. He made his debut later that day, in a 1–0 victory over Sutton United.

=== Notts County ===
On 13 July 2021, Taylor joined Chesterfield's rivals Notts County on a two-year deal, signing for an undisclosed fee.

On 12 November 2022, Taylor joined Dagenham & Redbridge on a two-month loan deal.

On 13 March 2023, Taylor departed Notts County after his contract was terminated by mutual consent.

=== Wealdstone ===
The day after his release from Notts County, Taylor joined National League play-off hopefuls Wealdstone. Taylor was released by Wealdstone at the end of the 2022-2023 season.

=== Chester ===
On 30 May 2023, it was announced that Taylor would be rejoining Chester on a one-year deal.

=== Hednesford Town ===
On 27 May 2024, Taylor joined Northern Premier League Division One West club Hednesford Town.

== Honours ==
Hednesford Town

- Northern Premier League Division One West play-offs: 2025
- Northern Premier League Play Offs: 2025-26

== Career statistics ==
As of match played 27 March 2024

Appearances and goals by club, season and competition
Club	Season	League			FA Cup		League Cup		Other		Total	
Club	Season	Division	Apps	Goals	Apps	Goals	Apps	Goals	Apps	Goals	Apps	Goals
Stoke City U23	2016–17	—	—		—		—		3 (Note: Appearance(s) in EFL Trophy)	0	3	0
Stoke City	2016–17	Premier League	0	0	0	0	0	0	0	0	0	0
Rochdale (loan)	2016–17	League One	1	0	0	0	0	0	0	0	1	0
Kidderminster Harriers	2017–18	National League North	29	0	4	1	—		2 (Note: One appearance in FA Trophy, one in National League North play-offs)	0	35	1
Kidderminster Harriers	2018–19	National League North	27	2	0	0	—		0	0	27	2
Kidderminster Harriers	Total		56	2	4	1	—		2	0	62	3
Halesowen Town (loan)	2018–19	SFL Premier Division Central	9	0	0	0	—		0	0	9	0
Chester	2019–20	National League North	30	0	2	0	—		6 (Note: Four appearances in FA Trophy, one appearance in Cheshire Senior Cup, one appearance in National League North play-offs)	0	38	0
Chester	2020–21	National League North	7	0	3	0	—		0	0	10	0
Chester	Total		37	0	5	0	—		6	0	48	0
Chesterfield	2020–21	National League	16	0	—		—		2 (Note: One appearance in FA Trophy, one appearance in National League play-offs)	0	18	0
Notts County	2021–22	National League	20	0	4	0	—		3 (Note: Appearance(s) in FA Trophy)	0	27	0
Notts County	2022–23	National League	2	1	1	0	—		0	0	3	1
Notts County	Total		22	1	5	0	—		3	0	30	1
Dagenham & Redbridge (loan)	2022–23	National League	7	0	—		—		1	0	8	0
Wealdstone	2022–23	National League South	3	0	—		—		0	0	3	0
Chester	2023–24	National League North	26	0	5	0	—		1	0	32	0
Career total			177	3	19	1	0	0	18	0	214	4
