= 2015–16 Rochdale A.F.C. season =

English football club season

Rochdale
2015–16 season
- Chairman: Chris Dunphy
- Manager: Keith Hill
- Stadium: Spotland Stadium
- League One: 10th
- FA Cup: Second round
- League Cup: Second round
- League Trophy: Northern quarter-finals
- Lancashire Senior Cup: First round
- Top goalscorer: League: Ian Henderson (13); All: Ian Henderson (13)
Home colours	Away colours	Third colours

The 2015–16 season was Rochdale A.F.C.'s 109th in existence and their second consecutive season in League One. Along with competing in League One, the club also participated in the FA Cup, League Cup and JP Trophy. The season covers the period from 1 July 2015 to 30 June 2016.

== Statistics ==
No.	Pos	Nat	Player	Total		League One		FA Cup		League Cup		League Trophy	
No.	Pos	Nat	Player	Apps	Goals	Apps	Goals	Apps	Goals	Apps	Goals	Apps	Goals
1	GK	(England) ENG	Josh Lillis	44	0	40+0	0	1+0	0	2+0	0	1+0	0
2	DF	(England) ENG	Joe Rafferty	33	1	29+2	1	0+0	0	2+0	0	0+0	0
3	DF	(England) ENG	Rhys Bennett	21	2	7+9	2	1+1	0	0+1	0	1+1	0
4	DF	(England) ENG	Jimmy McNulty	52	0	46+0	0	2+0	0	2+0	0	2+0	0
5	DF	(England) ENG	Ash Eastham	24	2	19+1	2	1+0	0	1+0	0	2+0	0
6	MF	(England) ENG	Ollie Lancashire	36	2	34+0	2	1+0	0	1+0	0	0+0	0
7	MF	(England) ENG	Peter Vincenti	43	8	26+12	8	1+1	0	2+0	0	1+0	0
8	MF	(Northern Ireland) NIR	Matty Lund	32	1	25+4	1	1+0	0	0+0	0	2+0	0
9	FW	(England) ENG	Calvin Andrew	35	6	14+16	6	1+1	0	1+1	0	1+0	0
10	MF	(England) ENG	Lewis Alessandra	11	2	3+5	1	0+0	0	0+1	0	1+1	1
11	FW	(England) ENG	Reuben Noble-Lazarus	13	1	2+8	1	0+0	0	1+1	0	0+1	0
12	MF	(Republic of Ireland) IRL	Donal McDermott	43	3	32+5	2	1+1	0	1+1	1	2+0	0
15	DF	(Republic of Ireland) IRL	Niall Canavan	11	1	11+0	1	0+0	0	0+0	0	0+0	0
16	MF	(Republic of Ireland) IRL	John O'Sullivan	3	0	2+0	0	1+0	0	0+0	0	0+0	0
17	DF	(England) ENG	Scott Tanser	11	1	6+1	0	2+0	0	0+0	0	2+0	1
18	FW	(England) ENG	Grant Holt	14	2	3+11	2	0+0	0	0+0	0	0+0	0
19	MF	(England) ENG	Nathaniel Mendez-Laing	36	10	18+15	7	1+0	3	0+0	0	2+0	0
20	DF	(Republic of Ireland) IRL	Brian Barry-Murphy	2	0	0+1	0	0+0	0	0+0	0	0+1	0
21	GK	(England) ENG	Johny Diba	0	0	0+0	0	0+0	0	0+0	0	0+0	0
23	GK	(England) ENG	Steve Collis	0	0	0+0	0	0+0	0	0+0	0	0+0	0
24	DF	(England) ENG	Jamie Allen	40	3	35+3	3	0+0	0	2+0	0	0+0	0
25	DF	(England) ENG	Michael Rose	34	1	23+7	1	1+1	0	0+1	0	1+0	0
26	FW	(England) ENG	Joel Logan	0	0	0+0	0	0+0	0	0+0	0	0+0	0
27	MF	(England) ENG	Andy Cannon	30	0	22+3	0	1+1	0	1+0	0	2+0	0
28	MF	(Northern Ireland) NIR	Callum Camps	36	5	28+4	5	2+0	0	1+0	0	1+0	0
29	FW	(France) FRA	John-Christophe Ayina	1	0	0+0	0	0+0	0	0+0	0	0+1	0
29	MF	(England) ENG	Dave Syers	6	0	2+4	0	0+0	0	0+0	0	0+0	0
31	FW	(England) ENG	Nyal Bell	0	0	0+0	0	0+0	0	0+0	0	0+0	0
32	MF	(England) ENG	Billy Hasler-Cregg	0	0	0+0	0	0+0	0	0+0	0	0+0	0
33	DF	(England) ENG	Tom Kennedy	21	0	17+1	0	0+0	0	2+0	0	0+1	0
34	FW	(England) ENG	James Hooper	3	0	1+1	0	1+0	0	0+0	0	0+0	0
39	FW	(England) ENG	Joe Bunney	34	9	19+13	9	1+0	0	1+0	0	0+0	0
40	MF	(England) ENG	Ian Henderson	42	13	36+3	13	1+0	0	2+0	0	0+0	0
44	GK	(Portugal) POR	Joel Pereira	8	0	6+0	0	1+0	0	0+0	0	1+0	0
	DF	(England) ENG	Kisimba Kisimba	0	0	0+0	0	0+0	0	0+0	0	0+0	0

== Transfers ==
=== Transfers in ===
Date from	Position	Name	From	Fee	Ref.
1 July 2015	RW	Lewis Alessandra	(Plymouth Argyle)	Free transfer	
1 July 2015	LW	Donal McDermott	(Ramsbottom United)	Free transfer	
1 July 2015	CB	Jimmy McNulty	(Bury)	Free transfer	
27 August 2015	RW	Nathaniel Mendez-Laing	(Peterborough United)	Free transfer	
6 November 2015	FW	John-Christophe Ayina		Free transfer	
18 January 2016	MF	Dave Syers	(Scunthorpe United)	Free transfer	
18 February 2016	FW	Grant Holt	(Wigan Athletic)	Free transfer	

† Brackets around club names denote the player's contract with that club had expired before he joined Rochdale.

=== Transfers out ===
Date from	Position	Name	To	Fee	Ref.
1 July 2015	CF	Febian Brandy		Released	
1 July 2015	CM	Stephen Dawson	(Scunthorpe United)	Free transfer	
1 July 2015	DM	Bastien Héry	(Carlisle United)	Free transfer	
1 July 2015	CB	Sean McGinty	(Aldershot Town)	Free transfer	
1 July 2015	CF	Jack Muldoon	(Lincoln City)	Free transfer	
3 August 2015	GK	Rhys Lovett	Cheltenham Town	Free transfer	
8 January 2016	FW	John-Christophe Ayina	(Newport County)	Released	

† Brackets around club names denote the player joined that club after his Rochdale contract expired.

=== Loans in ===
Date from	Position	Name	From	Date until	Ref.
17 October 2015	GK	Joel Castro Pereira	Manchester United	3 January 2016	
26 November 2015	MF	John O'Sullivan	Blackburn Rovers	3 January 2016	
15 February 2016	DF	Niall Canavan	Scunthorpe United	End of season	

=== Loans out ===
Date from	Position	Name	To	Date until	Ref.
1 August 2015	CF	Joel Logan	Wrexham	10 January 2016	
18 September 2015	ST	Nyal Bell	Droylsden	17 November 2015	
18 September 2015	ST	Billy Hasler-Cregg	Droylsden	End of season	
29 January 2016	FW	Nyal Bell	Chester	End of season	
8 March 2016	FW	Lewis Alessandra	York City	End of season	

== Competitions ==
=== Pre-season friendlies ===
On 8 May 2015, Rochdale confirmed their first pre-season friendly against Macclesfield Town on 18 July 2015. On 11 May 2015, the second confirmed pre-season friendly was announced against Chester on 14 July 2015. On 14 May 2015, a friendly against AFC Fylde was announced. A day later the club confirmed their fourth friendly, against Blackburn Rovers. On 21 May 2015, a fifth friendly was announced against Huddersfield Town. On 29 May 2015, Rochdale announced they will face Accrington Stanley on 28 July 2015. On 21 July 2015, Dale announced a third pre-season friendly.

12 July 2015 Friendly	AFC Fylde	1–0	Rochdale	Warton
14:00 BST	Allen 68' (pen.)	Report		Stadium: Kellamergh Park

14 July 2015 Friendly	Chester	0–1	Rochdale	Chester
19:45 BST		Report	Henderson 84'	Stadium: Deva Stadium

18 July 2015 Friendly	Macclesfield Town	0–0	Rochdale	Macclesfield
15:00 BST		Report		Stadium: Moss Rose

21 July 2015 Friendly	Rochdale	2–1	Blackburn Rovers	Rochdale
19:45 BST	Henderson 32', 83'	Report	Williamson 19'	Stadium: Spotland

25 July 2015 Friendly	Rochdale	4–3	Huddersfield Town	Rochdale
15:00 BST	Andrew 7'; Alessandra (?); Camps (?), 38'	Report	Wells (?), 48'; Scannell (?)	Stadium: Spotland; Attendance: 1,165

28 July 2015 Friendly	Accrington Stanley	1–0	Rochdale	Accrington
19:45 BST	McCartan 65'	Report		Stadium: Crown Ground

1 August 2015 Friendly	Rochdale	2–1	Milton Keynes Dons	Rochdale
15:00 BST	Noble-Lazarus 62'; McDermott 83'	Report	Bowditch 38'	Stadium: Spotland

=== League One ===
==== League table ====
Pos	Team	Pld	W	D	L	GF	GA	GD	Pts
8	Coventry City	46	19	12	15	67	49	+18	69
9	Gillingham	46	19	12	15	71	56	+15	69
10	Rochdale	46	19	12	15	68	61	+7	69
11	Sheffield United	46	18	12	16	64	59	+5	66
12	Port Vale	46	18	11	17	56	58	−2	65

Updated to match(es) played on 1 July 2016. Source: BBC Sport
Rules for classification: 1) Points; 2) Goal difference; 3) Number of goals scored

==== Matches ====
On 17 June 2015, the fixtures for the forthcoming season were announced.

8 August 2015 1	Rochdale	2–0	Peterborough United	Rochdale
15:00 BST	Camps 18'; Noble-Lazarus 69'; Vincenti (yellow card) 90+2'	Report	Ntlhe (yellow card) 44'	Stadium: Spotland; Attendance: 3,319; Referee: Andy Haines

15 August 2015 2	Blackpool	0–2	Rochdale	Blackpool
15:00 BST	Redshaw (yellow card) 20'; Osayi-Samuel (yellow card) 23'	Report	Allen (yellow card) 18'; McDermott 58'; Henderson 87'	Stadium: Bloomfield Road; Attendance: 7,076; Referee: Darren Drysdale

18 August 2015 3	Rochdale	1–2	Walsall	Rochdale
19:45 BST	Andrew 80'; Rafferty (yellow card) 55'	Report	Taylor 65'; Mantom 71'; Morris (yellow card) 85'	Stadium: Spotland; Attendance: 2,381; Referee: David Webb

22 August 2015 4	Chesterfield	0–0	Rochdale	Chesterfield
15:00 BST	Evatt (yellow card) 87'	Report	Henderson (yellow card) 82'; Andrew (yellow card) 89'	Stadium: Proact Stadium; Attendance: 6,254; Referee: Keith Hill

29 August 2015 5	Rochdale	3–0	Barnsley	Rochdale
15:00 BST	Andrew 8'; Vincenti 36'; Henderson 63'; Kennedy (yellow card) 27'	Report	Hourihane (yellow card) 5'	Stadium: Spotland; Attendance: 3,618; Referee: Gary Sutton

5 September 2015 6	Fleetwood Town	1–1	Rochdale	Fleetwood
15:00 BST	Jónsson (yellow card) 82'; Matt 87'; Maxwell (yellow card) 90+4'	Report	Vincenti 55'; Rafferty (yellow card) 86'	Stadium: Highbury Stadium; Referee: Geoff Eltringham

12 September 2015 7	Burton Albion	1–0	Rochdale	Burton upon Trent
15:00 BST	Binnom-Williams (yellow card) 29'; Beavon 34'; Cansdell-Sherriff (yellow card) 60'; Butcher (yellow card) 79'	Report	Rafferty (yellow card) 24'; Allen (yellow card) 42'; Noble-Lazarus (yellow card) 90+4'	Stadium: Pirelli Stadium; Attendance: 2,787; Referee: Carl Boyeson

19 September 2015 8	Rochdale	2–1	Scunthorpe United	Rochdale
15:00 BST	Bunney 67'; Vincenti 85'	Report	Hopper (yellow card) 49'; Bishop (yellow card) 51'; Wallace 76'	Stadium: Spotland Stadium; Attendance: 2,958; Referee: Peter Bankes

26 September 2015 9	Millwall	3–1	Rochdale	Bermondsey
15:00 BST	Abdou 4'; Williams 45'; Morison 60'; O'Brien (yellow card) 63'	Report	Vincenti 43' (yellow card) 83'; Cannon (yellow card) 63'	Stadium: New Den; Attendance: 8,023; Referee: James Adcock

29 September 2015 10	Rochdale	3–2	Shrewsbury	Rochdale
19:45 BST	Vincenti 4' (yellow card) 86'; Cannon (yellow card) 10'; Henderson 12' (pen.); Allen 15'; Kennedy (yellow card) 73'	Report	Knight-Percival 35' (yellow card) 85'; Collins 41' (pen.); Halstead (yellow card) 86'; Tootle (yellow card) 90+1'	Stadium: Spotland Stadium; Attendance: 2,190; Referee: Seb Stockbridge

3 October 2015 11	Rochdale	1–3	Bradford	Rochdale
15:00 BST	McDermott (yellow card) 2'; Vincenti 41'	Report	Liddle (yellow card) 30'; Evans 34'; Cole 59'; Lancashire 61' (o.g.); Davies (yellow card) 68'	Stadium: Spotland Stadium; Attendance: 4,534; Referee: Richard Harrington

10 October 2015 12	Sheffield United	3–2	Rochdale	Sheffield
15:00 BST	Adams 29', 40'; Collins 74'	Report	Cannon (yellow card) 21'; Vincenti 37' (pen.); Alessandra 72'	Stadium: Bramall Lane; Attendance: 19,039; Referee: Oliver Langford

17 October 2015 13	Bury	0–0	Rochdale	Bury
15:00 BST	Pugh (yellow card) 32'; Brown (yellow card) 61'	Report	Lund (yellow card) 67'; Cannon (yellow card) 71'; Allen (yellow card) 88'; Vincenti (yellow card) 90+2'	Stadium: Gigg Lane; Attendance: 6,470; Referee: Andy Woolmer

20 October 2015 14	Rochdale	0–0	Coventry City	Rochdale
15:00 BST	Henderson (yellow card) 68'	Report		Stadium: Spotland Stadium; Attendance: 2,495; Referee: Mark Haywood

24 October 2015 15	Rochdale	0–0	Oldham Athletic	Rochdale
15:00 BST	Lancashire (yellow card) 23'; McNulty (yellow card) 54'; Cannon (yellow card) 56'; Camps (yellow card) 73'; Allen (yellow card) 83'	Report	Jones (yellow card) 32'; Kelly (yellow card) 62'; Eckersley (yellow card) 81'	Stadium: Spotland; Attendance: 5,690; Referee: Andy Madley

31 October 2015 16	Southend United	2–2	Rochdale	Southend-on-Sea
19:45 GMT	Timlin (yellow card) 24'; Mooney 39' (pen.); Leonard 41'	Report	Lillis (yellow card) 38'; Bunney 63'; Lancashire (yellow card) 72'; Rose 79'; Lund (yellow card) 90+1'	Stadium: Roots Hall; Attendance: 6,111; Referee: Steve Martin

14 November 2015 17	Rochdale	0–2	Wigan Athletic	Rochdale
12:30 GMT	Eastham (yellow card) 34'	Report	Pearce 16'; Morgan (yellow card) 36'; Jacobs 61'	Stadium: Spotland Stadium; Attendance: 3,835; Referee: Neil Swarbrick

21 November 2015 18	Doncaster	0–2	Rochdale	Doncaster
15:00 GMT	Williams (yellow card) 8'	Report	Cannon (yellow card) 23'; Henderson (yellow card) 34' (goal) 84', 90+6'; Rose (yellow card) 90+5'	Stadium: Keepmoat Stadium; Attendance: 5,521; Referee: Kevin Friend

24 November 2015 19	Gillingham	2–0	Rochdale	Gillingham
19:45 GMT	Dack 7'; Oshilaja (yellow card) 41' (goal) 80'; Donnelly (yellow card) 67'	Report	Camps (yellow card) 12'; Andrew (yellow card) 88'; Lancashire (yellow card) 90+4'	Stadium: Priestfield Stadium; Attendance: 5,088; Referee: Stuart Attwell

28 November 2015 20	Rochdale	2–1	Port Vale	Rochdale
15:00 GMT	O'Sullivan (yellow card) 15'; Henderson 40' (pen.); McDermott (yellow card) 54'; Mendez-Laing 78'; Andrew (yellow card) 81'; Camps (yellow card) 88'	Report	Birchall 13'; Dickinson (yellow card) 40' (yellow-red card) 90+6'	Stadium: Spotland Stadium; Attendance: 2,510; Referee: Darren England

12 December 2015 21	Swindon Town	2–1	Rochdale	Swindon
15:00 GMT	Robert 33'; Gladwin 34'	Report	O'Sullivan (red card) 12'; McDermott (yellow card) 40'; Henderson (yellow card) 58'; Lancashire 60'; Lund (yellow card) 71'; McNulty (yellow card) 90+6'	Stadium: County Ground; Attendance: 7,149; Referee: David Webb

19 December 2015 22	Rochdale	3–1	Colchester United	Rochdale
15:00 GMT	Henderson 30' (pen.); McDermott 34'; Lancashire 64'	Report	Porter 21'; Harriott (yellow card) 56'; Briggs (yellow card) 67'	Stadium: Spotland Stadium; Attendance: 2,205; Referee: Trevor Kettle

26 December 2015 Postponed	Rochdale	P–P	Crewe Alexandra	Rochdale
15:00 GMT		Report		Stadium: Spotland Stadium

28 December 2015 23	Scunthorpe United	1–1	Rochdale	Scunthorpe
15:00 BST	Mirfin 33'; Dawson (yellow card) 74'; Bishop (yellow card) 82' van Veen (yellow card) 88'	Report	McDermott (yellow card) 16'; Henderson 22'; Lancashire (yellow card) 48'; Lund (yellow card) 57'	Stadium: Glanford Park; Attendance: 3,860; Referee: Darren Bond

2 January 2016 24	Walsall	0–3	Rochdale	Walsall
15:00 BST		Report	Henderson 3'; McDermott (yellow card) 35'; Andrew 58', 77' (yellow card) 90+1'; Cannon (yellow card) 67'; Vincenti (yellow card) 82'	Stadium: Bescot Stadium; Attendance: 4,857; Referee: Graham Salisbury

9 January 2016 25	Rochdale	2–3	Chesterfield	Rochdale
15:00	Rose (yellow card) 22'; McDermott (yellow card) 46'; Lund (yellow card) 53'; Henderson 58'; Bennett 90+3'	Report	O'Shea 26'; Hird (yellow card) 35'; Ariyibi (yellow card) 48' (yellow-red card); Novak 78'; Ebanks-Blake 80'; Gardener (yellow card) 86'; Lee (yellow card) 90+4'	Stadium: Spotland Stadium; Attendance: 2,965; Referee: (England) Carl Boyeson

23 January 2016 26	Barnsley	6–1	Rochdale	Barnsley
15:00	Mawson 8'; Winnall 52' 69' 89'; Watkins 84'; Long 90+3'	Report	Mendez-Laing 65'; McNulty (yellow card) 89'	Stadium: Oakwell; Attendance: 8,823; Referee: (England) Nigel Miller

30 January 2016 27	Rochdale	2–1	Burton Albion	Rochdale
15:00	Camps 8'; Henderson 24' (pen.)	Report	Akins 78'	Stadium: Spotland Stadium; Attendance: 2,994; Referee: (England) Stuart Attwell

6 February 2016 28	Crewe Alexandra	2–0	Rochdale	Crewe
15:00	Fox (yellow card) 7'; Haber 31'; Inman 45'	Report	Rafferty (yellow card) 49'; Lund (yellow card) 57'	Stadium: Alexandra Stadium; Attendance: 4,130; Referee: (England) Ross Joyce

13 February 2016 29	Rochdale	0–1	Millwall	Rochdale
15:00	Lancashire (yellow card) 10'; Henderson (yellow card) 50'	Report	Nelson (yellow card) 50'; Gregory 54'; Martin (yellow card) 57'; Williams (yellow card) 76'	Stadium: Spotland Stadium; Attendance: 2,882; Referee: (England) Graham Salibury

16 February 2016 30	Rochdale	2–2	Crewe Alexandra	Rochdale
19:45	Bennett 2'; Bunney 6'; Lund (yellow card) 45+6'; Rose (yellow card) 45+6'	Report	Haber 24'; Seager 27'; Bakayogo (yellow card) 45+5'	Stadium: Spotland Stadium; Attendance: 1,985; Referee: (England) Eddie Ilderton

20 February 2016 31	Bradford City	2–2	Rochdale	Bradford
15:00	McArdle 40'; Davies 62'; McMahon (yellow card) 69'	Report	Bunney 12' 51'; Eastham (yellow card) 17'	Stadium: Coral Windows Stadium; Attendance: 17,936; Referee: (England) Richard Clark

23 February 2016 32	Rochdale	1–0	Fleetwood Town	Rochdale
19:45	Bunney 12'; Henderson (yellow card) 30'	Report	Maxwell (yellow card) 31'	Stadium: Spotland Stadium; Attendance: 1,767; Referee: (England) Darren Handley

27 February 2016 33	Rochdale	2–0	Sheffield United	Rochdale
15:00	Lund (yellow card) 25'; Canavan (yellow card) 29'; Vincenti (yellow card) 56' (goal) 67'; Holt 81'	Report	Adams (yellow card) 45+2'	Stadium: Spotland Stadium; Attendance: 4,210; Referee: (England) Mark Heywood

1 March 2016 34	Shrewsbury Town	2–0	Rochdale	Shrewsbury
19:45	Whalley 12'; Knight-Percival 45'	Report	Allen (yellow card) 83'	Stadium: Greenhous Meadow; Attendance: 4,221; Referee: (England) Ben Toner

5 March 2016 35	Coventry City	0–1	Rochdale	Coventry
15:00		Report	Camps (yellow card) 83'; Henderson 89' (pen.)	Stadium: Ricoh Arena; Attendance: 9,942; Referee: (England) Oliver Langford

12 March 2016 36	Rochdale	3–0	Bury	Rochdale
15:00	Mendez-Laing 11' 17'; Eastham 53'	Report	Gardener (yellow card) 26'; Pugh (yellow card) 57'	Stadium: Spotland Stadium; Attendance: 4,538; Referee: (England) Tony Harrington

19 March 2016 37	Oldham Athletic	2–3	Rochdale	Oldham
15:00	Amadi-Holloway 29' 71'	Report	Henderson (yellow card) 31' (yellow-red card) (goal) 37' (pen.); Gerrard 49' (o.g.); Camps 55'; Rafferty (yellow card) 90+4'	Stadium: Boundary Park; Attendance: 6,117; Referee: (England) Paul Tierney (referee)

25 March 2016 38	Rochdale	4–1	Southend United	Rochdale
15:00	Holt 41'; Rafferty 49'; McNulty (yellow card) 56'; Allen 61'; Vincenti (yellow card) 83'; Bunney 90'	Report	Payne 28'	Stadium: Spotland Stadium; Attendance: 3,018; Referee: (England) Jeremy Simpson

28 March 2016 39	Wigan Athletic	1–0	Rochdale	Wigan
13:30	Perkins (yellow card) 29'; Pearce (yellow card) 34'; McAleny 67'	Report	Henderson (red card) 33'; McNulty (yellow card) 70'; Rafferty (yellow card) 74'	Stadium: DW Stadium; Attendance: 10,407; Referee: (England) Mark Brown

2 April 2016 40	Rochdale	2–2	Doncaster Rovers	Rochdale
15:00	Camps 43'; Vincenti (yellow card) 83'; Canavan 90+6'	Report	Lund 57'; Butler 68'; Alcock (yellow card) 83' (yellow-red card); Chaplow (yellow card) 90+6'	Stadium: Spotland Stadium; Attendance: 2,727; Referee: (England) Darren Bond

9 April 2016 41	Peterborough United	1–2	Rochdale	Peterborough
15:00	Smith 34'; Maddison (yellow card) 90+1'	Report	Bunney 8'; Mendez-Laing 23'; Rafferty (yellow card) 53'; Lund (yellow card) 72'	Stadium: ABAX Stadium; Attendance: 4,785; Referee: (England) Fred Graham (referee)

16 April 2016 42	Rochdale	3–0	Blackpool	Rochdale
15:00	Eastham 45'; Bunney 50'; Mendez-Laing 60'; Vincenti (yellow card) 89'	Report	Boyce (yellow card) 88'	Stadium: Spotland Stadium; Attendance: 3,247; Referee: (England) Lee Collins

19 April 2016 43	Rochdale	1–1	Gillingham	Rochdale
19:45	Camps 45+1'; Rose (yellow card) 56'	Report	Egan 77'; Hessenthaler (yellow card) 80'	Stadium: Spotland Stadium; Attendance: 2,385; Referee: (England) Kevin Wright

23 April 2016 44	Port Vale	4–1	Rochdale	Burslem
15:00	Robinson 37'; O'Connor 45' (pen.) 76' (pen.); Hooper 46'	Report	Eastham (yellow card) 29'; Andrew 50'	Stadium: Vale Park; Attendance: 4,380; Referee: (England) Nick Kinseley

30 April 2016 45	Rochdale	2–2	Swindon Town	Rochdale
15:00	Henderson (yellow card) 16'; Camps (yellow card) 34'; Allen 45+2'; Lund (yellow card) 63' (goal) 67'	Report	Obika 2'; Ormonde-Ottewill (yellow card) 36' (red card) 88'; Thompson 45+1'; Thompson (yellow card) 45+3' (yellow-red card) 58'; Raphael Rossi Branco (yellow card) 65'	Stadium: Spotland Stadium; Attendance: 2,806; Referee: (England) Scott Duncan (referee)

8 May 2016 46	Colchester United	1–2	Rochdale	Colchester
12:30	Edwards 53'	Report	Mendez-Laing 18'; Andrew 69'	Stadium: Weston Homes Community Stadium; Attendance: 3,435; Referee: (England) Andrew Davies

=== FA Cup ===
On 26 October 2015, the first round draw was made. Rochdale were drawn at home against Swindon Town. Rochdale were at home to Bury in the second round.

7 November 2015 1st round	Rochdale	3–1	Swindon	Rochdale
15:00 BST	Mendez-Laing 24', 46', 69' (pen.)	Report	Ajose 71' (pen.)	Stadium: Spotland; Attendance: 2,060; Referee: Chris Sarginson

6 December 2015 2nd round	Rochdale	0–1	Bury	Rochdale
12:00		Report	Rose 8'	Stadium: Spotland; Attendance: 4,887; Referee: Darren Drysdale

=== League Cup ===
On 16 June 2015, the first round draw was made, Rochdale were drawn at home against Coventry City. Rochdale were drawn away to Hull City in the second round.

11 August 2015 1st round	Rochdale	1–1 (5–3 p)	Coventry City	Rochdale
19:45 BST	McDermott 45'	Report	Tudgay 84'	Stadium: Spotland; Attendance: 1,986; Referee: Eddie Ilderton
	Penalties
	Rose (penalty scored); Henderson (penalty scored); Kennedy (penalty scored); Rafferty (penalty scored); Andrew (penalty scored)		Tudgay (penalty scored); Morris (penalty scored); Maddison (penalty scored); Lameiras (penalty missed)

25 August 2015 2nd round	Hull City	1–0	Rochdale	Kingston upon Hull
19:45 BST	Luer 9'	Report		Stadium: KC Stadium; Attendance: 10,430; Referee: Mark Haywood

=== Football League Trophy ===
On 5 September 2015, the second round draw was shown live on Soccer AM and drawn by Charlie Austin and Ed Skrein. Rochdale will host Chesterfield.

6 October 2015 2nd round	Rochdale	2–1	Chesterfield	Rochdale
19:00 BST	Tanser 18'; Bennett (yellow card) 45'; Alessandra 66'		Eastham 65' (o.g.)	Stadium: Spotland; Attendance: 1,042; Referee: (England) Jeremy Simpson

10 November 2015 Northern QF	Rochdale	0–1	Morecambe	Rochdale
19:45 BST	McNulty (yellow card) 24'; Cannon (yellow card) 82'		Mullin 17'; Miller (yellow card) 79'; McGowan (yellow card) 88'	Stadium: Spotland; Attendance: 1,428; Referee: (England) David Coote

=== Lancashire Senior Cup ===
On the Lancashire FA website the first round details were announced, Rochdale will face Manchester United.

9 September 2015 1st round	Rochdale	2–3	Manchester United	Rochdale
19:45 BST	Alessandra 45'; Rose 62' (pen.)	Report	Fletcher 10', 18', 47' (pen.)	Stadium: Spotland Stadium; Referee: Paul Marsden
