= Donal McDermott =

Irish footballer

Personal information
- Full name: Donal Jeremiah McDermott
- Date of birth: 19 October 1989 (age 37)
- Place of birth: Dublin, Ireland
- Positions: Winger; forward

Youth career
- Ashbourne United
- Cherry Orchard
- 2006–2008: Manchester City

Senior career*
Years	Team	Apps	(Gls)
2008–2011	Manchester City	0	(0)
2008	→ Milton Keynes Dons (loan)	1	(0)
2009	→ Chesterfield (loan)	15	(5)
2010	→ Scunthorpe United (loan)	9	(0)
2011	→ Bournemouth (loan)	9	(1)
2011–2012	Huddersfield Town	9	(0)
2012–2014	Bournemouth	20	(1)
2014	Dundalk	12	(0)
2015	Salford City	0	(0)
2015	Ramsbottom United	9	(2)
2015–2017	Rochdale	54	(3)
2017–2018	Swindon Town	17	(1)

International career
2005–2006	Republic of Ireland U17	5	(2)
2007	Republic of Ireland U18	1	(0)
2007–2008	Republic of Ireland U19	6	(1)
- * Club domestic league appearances and goals

Donal Jeremiah McDermott (born 19 October 1989) is an Irish former footballer who last played for Swindon Town.

== Club career ==
=== Manchester City/Loan Spells ===
McDermott began his career at Ashbourne United then moved to Cherry Orchard of Dublin, where he was scouted, and signed up by Manchester City. McDermott was a member of the team that clinched the 2008 FA Youth Cup for the Blues.

On 12 September 2008, McDermott joined Football League One side Milton Keynes Dons on a one-month loan deal. The following day, he made his debut for the club against Oldham Athletic, coming on as a second-half substitute, in a 2–0 loss. This would turn out to be his only appearance for the Milton Keynes Dons as his loan spell was ended prematurely due to injury. McDermott returned to Manchester City where he remained in the reserves for the remainder of the season.

At the start of the 2009–10 season, McDermott signed a new two-year deal to stay at the City of Manchester Stadium. After signing the new contract, he joined Football League Two side Chesterfield on a three-month loan deal. McDermott made his debut on the opening day of the season in a defeat to Torquay United. A week later on 15 August 2009, he scored his first goal for the club on his home debut in a 1–0 win over Northampton Town. Since joining Chesterfield, McDermott became a first team regular for the club, playing in the midfield position. He then scored two goals in the next two matches between 12 September 2009 and 19 September 2009 against Dagenham & Redbridge and Macclesfield Town. Eleven days later on 30 September 2009, McDermott scored his fourth goal for Chesterfield, as well as, setting up one of the club's goals, in a 3–2 win against Grimsby Town. This was followed up by setting up two goals in the next two matches against Accrington Stanley and Bournemouth. Two weeks later on 24 October 2009, he scored his fifth goal of the season, in a 5–2 win against Burton Albion. McDermott returned to his parent club when his loan spell with the club expired at the end of October. By the time he left Chesterfield, McDermott made sixteen appearances and scoring five times for the club.

Following his loan spell at Chesterfield ended, McDermott spent the next three months, playing for the Manchester City Elite Development Squad. Towards the end of the January 2010 transfer window, he went out on loan for a third time, this time until the end of the season at Championship side, Scunthorpe United. McDermott made his debut for the club, coming on as a second-half substitute, in a 1–0 win against Queens Park Rangers on 30 January 2010. Following this, he found his playing time, mostly coming from the substitute bench. At the end of the 2009–10 season, McDermott went on to make nine appearances in all competitions.

For the first seven months of the 2010–11 season, McDermott continued to play for the Manchester City Elite Development Squad. On 24 March 2011, he was loaned out for a fourth time, this time to Football League One club Bournemouth. McDermott made his debut for the club, coming on as an 82nd-minute substitute, in a 2–2 draw against Charlton Athletic on 26 March 2011. Since joining Bournemouth, he was involved in a number of matches in the first team for the rest of the 2010–11 season. McDermott then scored his first goal for the club, in a 2–2 draw against Hartlepool United on 30 April 2011, resulting in them securing a League One play–offs place. In the follow–up match against Rochdale, however, he suffered a hamstring injury and was substituted in the 44th minute, as Bournemouth lost 2–1. McDermott recovered from his injury and returned to the starting line–up in the semi-final of League One play–offs against Huddersfield Town and scored his second goal for the club, in a 1–1 draw on 14 May 2011. In the return leg, he started the match and played 77 minutes before being substituted, as Bournemouth lost on penalties to Huddersfield Town after the semi-final finished 4–4 on aggregate. At the end of the 2010–11 season, McDermott made eleven appearances and scoring two times in all competitions.

=== Huddersfield Town ===
Despite interest from Bournemouth, it was announced on 1 July 2011 that McDermott signed a two-year contract with Huddersfield Town on the expiry of his contract at Eastlands. As he was offered a new deal, the fee will be decided by a tribunal. Upon joining the club, McDermott was given a number twenty shirt.

He made his Terriers debut, starting a match and playing 52 minutes before being substituted, in the 1–1 draw against Bury at the Galpharm Stadium on 6 August 2011 in the opening game of the season. After the match, manager Lee Clark said about McDermott: "He showed that he can be a genius in terms of creating chances. McDermott can put others in and also create opportunities for himself, but it's important he learns to do the right thing in the right areas of the pitch, because a couple of times at Port Vale, he got caught out. McDermott knows it and with our help, he'll learn, and McDermott will be an excellent acquisition for us, because in the final third, he's a real threat." McDermott then set up a goal for Lee Novak, who scored a winning goal, in a 3–2 win against Colchester United on 20 August 2011. Ten days later on 30 August 2011, he scored his first goal for the club in the 2–1 win over Northampton Town at the Sixfields Stadium in the Football League Trophy. For his performance, McDermott was nominated for the Ultimate Finish Award in Johnstone's Paint Trophy. Having become a first team regular at the start of the 2011–12 season, he soon lost his first team place, due to strong competitions. As a result, McDermott made four more appearances for the rest of the year. Manager Clark responded to his lack of first team opportunities, saying: "He has had to be patient and McDermott did lots of good things. There are things he has to work on, and we have to nurture him, but McDermott has unbelievable ability, which we see every week in training." By the time he left Huddersfield Town, McDermott made fourteen appearances and scoring once in all competitions.

=== AFC Bournemouth ===
On 31 January 2012, McDermott made a permanent switch from Huddersfield Town to return to Bournemouth. Upon joining the club, he said: "I have come here to fight for my place. There is an unbelievable squad here and it is down to me to work hard and get myself in the side. I am so happy to be back here and my aim is to help the club as much as I can. The quality is here to have success this season."

McDermott made his second debut for Bournemouth, starting a match and playing 68 minutes before being substituted, in a 2–0 win against Exeter City on 7 February 2012. Since re–joining the club, he found himself in and out of the starting line–up, playing in the midfield position. McDermott scored his first goal for the club in over a year, in a 1–1 draw against Scunthorpe United on 28 April 2012. In a follow–up match against Preston North End, he set up the only goal of the game by winning a penalty, allowing Charlie Daniels to successfully convert the penalty, in a 1–0 win. At the end of the 2011–12 season, McDermott went on to make fourteen appearances and scoring once in all competitions.

McDermott made his first appearance of the 2012–13 season, coming on as a 76th-minute substitute, against Oxford United in the first round of the League Cup, and was one of the three players to successfully convert their penalties as Bournemouth lost 5–3 on penalties following a 0–0 draw. However, he found his first team opportunities limited, due to competitions, with returning manager Eddie Howe challenged him to fight for his place in the first team. At one point, McDermott was linked with a move to Chesterfield, but the move was never materialised. He found his playing time mostly, coming from the substitute bench. Despite this, McDermott set up two goals, coming from the league against Notts County on 23 October 2012 and then from the FA Cup match against Dagenham & Redbridge on 3 November 2012. The club was later promoted to the Championship after beating Carlisle United 3–1 on 20 April 2013. At the end of the 2012–13 season, he went on to make eight appearances in all competitions.

In the 2013–14 season, McDermott continued to find his first team opportunities limited, as he found himself placed on the substitute bench. As a result, McDermott made only two appearances for the club this season, both of the matches were from League Cup. On 3 April 2014, Bournemouth announced his departure from the club despite having fifteen months left to his contract.

=== Dundalk and non–league football ===
On 5 July 2014, McDermott made a permanent switch from Bournemouth to Dundalk, marking his first club in his home country. He made his debut for the club, coming on as a 58th-minute substitute, in a 1–0 win against Shamrock Rovers on 13 July 2014. McDermott played in both legs of the UEFA Europa League second round against Hajduk Split, as Dundalk lost 3–2 on aggregate. McDermott found his playing time, mostly coming from the substitute bench for the rest of the 2014 season. Despite this, his contributions saw Dundalk win the title for the first time since the 1994–95 season after beating Cork City 2–0 in Oriel Park in the last game of the season. At the end of the 2014 season, he went on to play thirteen times for the club. Following this, McDermott left the club.

After leaving Dundalk at the end of the 2014 season, McDermott returned to England, where he joined Salford City on 6 January 2015. However, McDermott made no appearances for the club and he joined Ramsbottom United on 11 February 2015. McDermott made his Ramsbottom United debut, starting the whole game, in a 1–1 draw against Stamford on 14 February 2015. On 20 March 2015, he scored his first goal for the club, in a 3–3 draw against Blyth Spartans. This was followed up by scoring his second goal for Ramsbottom United, in a 2–1 win against Belper Town. At the end of the 2014–15 season, McDermott went on to make nine appearances and scoring two times in all competitions.

=== Rochdale ===
On 7 May 2015, McDermott signed a one-year contract with Rochdale. Upon joining the club, he was given a number twelve shirt.

McDermott made his debut for Rochdale, starting a match and playing 67 minutes before being substituted, in a 2–0 win over Peterborough United in the opening game of the season. Three days later on 11 August 2015, he scored his first goal for the club in the 45th minute against Coventry City in the first round of the League Cup and helped Rochdale win 5–3 on penalties following a 1–1 draw. His goal against Coventry City later earned him the club's Goal of the Month for August and Goal of the Season. Four days later on 15 August 2015, McDermott scored his second goal for the club, in a 2–0 win against Blackpool. Since joining Rochdale, McDermott quickly became a first team regular, playing in the midfield position. For his performance, he was awarded the club's Player of the Month for August. McDermott then scored his second goal for Rochdale, in a 3–1 win against Colchester United on 19 December 2015. Two weeks later on 2 January 2016, McDermott set up two goals for Calvin Andrew, who scored twice during the match, in a 3–0 win against Walsall. However, he was sidelined for a month after suffering a stomach complaint. On 5 March 2016, McDermott made his return to the starting line–up against Coventry City, playing 60 minutes before being substituted, in a 1–0 win. Following his return from injury, he began to contribute with six assists, including twice against Blackpool on 16 April 2016. McDermott also regained his first team place, playing in the midfield position. At the end of the 2015–16 season, he went on to make forty–three appearances and scoring three times in all competitions. Following this, McDermott signed a contract extension with the club.

At the start of the 2016–17 season, McDermott contributed to assist three goals, including two times in the League Cup. However, he found his playing time, mostly coming from the substitute bench throughout the 2016–17 season. However, McDermott was sidelined for a month when he suffered an injury while warming up prior to a match against Hartlepool United on 9 November 2016. McDermott made his return from injury against Chesterfield in the second round of the EFL Trophy, coming on as a 54th-minute substitute, in a 2–0 loss on 6 December 2016. After rehabilitating from his return for a month, he made his return to the first team, coming on as a 70th-minute substitute, in a 0–0 draw against Bristol Rovers on 4 February 2017. However, McDermott received a straight red card in the 52nd minute, just seven minutes after coming on as a second-half substitute, in a 3–1 loss against Peterborough United on 25 February 2017. After serving a three match suspension, he returned to the starting line–up against Gillingham on 18 March 2017, coming on as an 81st-minute substitute, in a 4–1 win. McDermott then scored his first goal of the season, in a 3–0 win against Port Vale on 4 April 2017. At the end of the 2016–17 season, he went on to make twenty–one appearances and scoring once in all competitions. Following this, McDermott was released by Rochdale.

=== Swindon Town ===
On 13 July 2017, McDermott joined League Two side Swindon Town on a one-year deal following a successful trial. Upon joining the club, he was given a number eighteen shirt.

After missing a match due to injury, McDermott made his debut for Swindon Town during their 1–1 home draw with Exeter City, featuring for 45 minutes before being replaced at half-time by Kaiyne Woolery on 12 August 2017. A week later, McDermott scored his first goal for the club in the club's 1–0 away victory against Morecambe, firing his effort past goalkeeper, Barry Roche in the 13th minute. However, in a match against Barnet on 2 September 2017, he received a straight red card in the 50th minute for a foul on David Tutonda, in a 4–1 loss. After serving a three match suspension, McDermott made his return to the first team, coming on as a 59th-minute substitute, in a 2–1 loss against Coventry City on 26 September 2017. However, after a 4–2 win against Bristol Rovers on 8 November 2017, he suffered ankle ligament injury and was sidelined for a month. On 15 December 2017, McDermott made his return to the starting line–up against Colchester United and played 68 minutes before being substituted, in a 3–2 loss. However, his return was short–lived when he suffered a groin injury that kept him out for two months. On 30 March 2018, McDermott made his return to the first team, coming on as an 86th-minute substitute, in a 1–1 draw against Morecambe. Following his return from injury, he appeared five more matches for Swindon Town. At the end of the 2017–18 season, McDermott went on to make twenty–one appearances and scoring once in all competitions. Following this, he was released by the club at the end of the 2017–18 season.

== International career ==
McDermott represented Republic of Ireland U17, Republic of Ireland U18 and Republic of Ireland U19.

== Personal life ==
In March 2012, McDermott was charged for driving under an influence whilst over the legal alcohol limit. A month later, he was given an 18-month driving ban.

== Career statistics ==
As of match played 28 April 2018.

Appearances and goals by club, season and competition
Club	Season	League			National Cup		League Cup		Other		Total	
Club	Season	Division	Apps	Goals	Apps	Goals	Apps	Goals	Apps	Goals	Apps	Goals
Milton Keynes Dons (loan)	2008–09	League One	1	0	0	0	0	0	0	0	1	0
Chesterfield (loan)	2009–10	League Two	15	5	0	0	1	0	2 (Note: Appearance(s) in Football League Trophy)	0	18	5
Scunthorpe United (loan)	2009–10	Championship	9	0	0	0	0	0	—		9	0
Bournemouth (loan)	2010–11	League One	9	1	0	0	0	0	2 (Note: Appearance(s) in League One play-offs)	1	11	2
Huddersfield Town	2011–12	League One	9	0	1	0	2	0	2	1	14	1
Bournemouth	2011–12	League One	14	1	0	0	0	0	0	0	14	1
Bournemouth	2012–13	League One	6	0	1	0	1	0	0	0	8	0
Bournemouth	2013–14	Championship	0	0	0	0	2	0	—		2	0
Bournemouth	Total		20	1	1	0	3	0	0	0	24	1
Dundalk	2014	League of Ireland Premier Division	12	0	1	0	1	0	2 (Note: Appearance(s) in UEFA Europa League)	0	16	0
Ramsbottom United	2014–15	Northern Premier League Premier Division	9	2	0	0	—		1 (Note: Appearance(s) in Northern Premier League Challenge Cup)	1	10	3
Rochdale	2015–16	League One	37	2	2	0	2	1	2	0	43	3
Rochdale	2016–17	League One	17	1	1	0	2	0	1 (Note: Appearance(s) in EFL Trophy)	0	21	1
Rochdale	Total		54	3	3	0	4	1	3	0	64	4
Swindon Town	2017–18	League Two	17	1	1	0	0	0	3	0	21	1
Career total			155	13	7	0	11	1	15	3	188	17

== Honours ==
Dundalk

- League of Ireland (1): 2014
