= Matty Lund =

English footballer (born 1990)

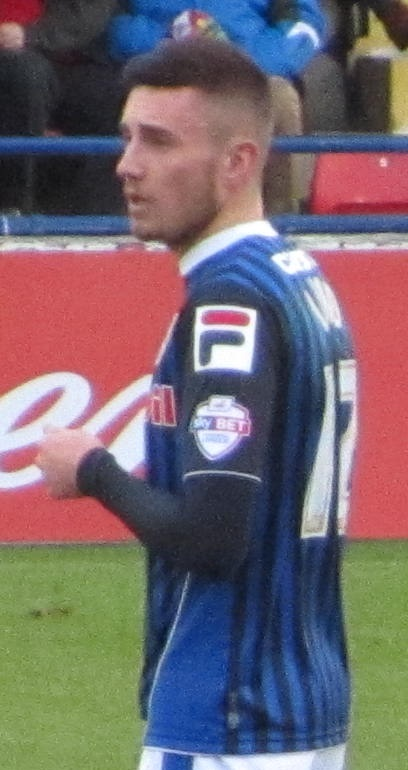
- Lund playing for Rochdale in 2013

Personal information
- Full name: Matthew Charles Lund
- Date of birth: 21 November 1990 (age 35)
- Place of birth: Manchester, England
- Height: 1.83 m (6 ft 0 in)
- Position: Midfielder

Youth career
- 2007–2009: Crewe Alexandra

Senior career*
Years	Team	Apps	(Gls)
2009–2013	Stoke City	0	(0)
2010	→ Hereford United (loan)	2	(0)
2011	→ Oldham Athletic (loan)	3	(0)
2012	→ Bristol Rovers (loan)	13	(2)
2012–2013	→ Bristol Rovers (loan)	18	(2)
2013	→ Southend United (loan)	12	(1)
2013–2017	Rochdale	112	(20)
2017–2018	Burton Albion	12	(1)
2018	→ Bradford City (loan)	10	(2)
2018–2020	Scunthorpe United	44	(6)
2020–2021	Rochdale	37	(12)
2021–2025	Salford City	143	(21)

International career^{‡}
2011–2012	Northern Ireland U21	6	(0)
2016–2017	Northern Ireland	3	(0)
- * Club domestic league appearances and goals as of 12:29, 13 May 2025 (UTC) ‡ National team caps and goals as of 22:35, 31 January 2020 (UTC)

Matthew Charles Lund (born 21 November 1990) is a professional footballer who plays as a midfielder.

A former Crewe Alexandra youth trainee, Lund began his senior career with English club Stoke City in the Premier League, where he failed to make his debut. He instead made his senior debut during a loan spell at Hereford United in November 2010. Further loan spells took Lund to Oldham Athletic and Bristol Rovers (twice) and he ended 2011–12 on loan at Southend United. In July 2013, Lund made a permanent transfer to then-League Two side Rochdale, after being released by Stoke City. He went on to enjoy an excellent season, scoring nine goals from midfield to help Rochdale to promotion.

Born in England, Lund has played internationally for the Northern Ireland national team six times at the under-21 level and three times at senior level.

== Club career ==
=== Stoke City ===
Lund started his career at Crewe Alexandra's Academy. He joined Stoke City in the summer of 2009 along with fellow Crewe teammate Ben Marshall. Unlike Marshall who went out on loan Lund stayed at Stoke and played in the reserve team. He had a number of impressive displays in the reserve squad most notably against Portsmouth where Lund scored three times and created two. His first appearance on the Stoke bench came in a Premier League game against Burnley in February 2010.

Lund joined Jamie Pitman at Hereford United on a month's loan on 23 November 2010. He made his professional debut in a 2–2 draw with Lincoln City in the FA Cup. He made his league debut in a 1–0 loss to Bradford City on 11 December 2010.

In July 2011 Lund joined League One side Oldham Athletic on loan until 21 November 2011. Lund made his debut for the club with an assist in a 1–0 pre season victory against Fleetwood Town and his competitive club debut on the first day of the 2011–12 season, starting the Football League match against Sheffield United. He was recalled by Stoke from his loan at Oldham on 9 September as Lund was not getting played in the first team.

On 30 January 2012 Lund joined Bristol Rovers on a month's loan, scoring his first two senior goals in his final loan appearance for the club. In July 2012 he re-joined Bristol Rovers on loan following a successful spell. He scored on his final appearance of his second loan spell in a 2–1 win over Plymouth Argyle. He joined Southend United on loan in February 2013. He played 13 games for the Shrimpers scoring once against Northampton Town. He was released by Stoke at the end of the 2012–13 season.

=== Rochdale ===
Lund joined Rochdale on 21 June 2013 signing a two-year contract.

On 31 October 2014, Lund signed a contract extension tying him to the club until summer 2016.

On 17 December 2016, Lund scored his first career hat-trick, scoring all three of Rochdale's goals in a 3–2 win against Northampton Town.

=== Burton Albion ===
On 19 May 2017, Lund joined Burton Albion signing a two-year contract after his four-year spell at Rochdale. He scored his first goal for Burton in a 3–2 EFL Cup win against Oldham Athletic on 9 August 2017.

On 26 January 2018, Matty joined Bradford City on loan for the rest of the season.

=== Scunthorpe United ===
On 3 August 2018, Matty joined Scunthorpe United for an undisclosed fee, signing a two-year deal with the club.

=== Rochdale return ===
On 31 January 2020, Lund returned to Rochdale for an undisclosed fee, signing a 18-month contract.

=== Salford City ===
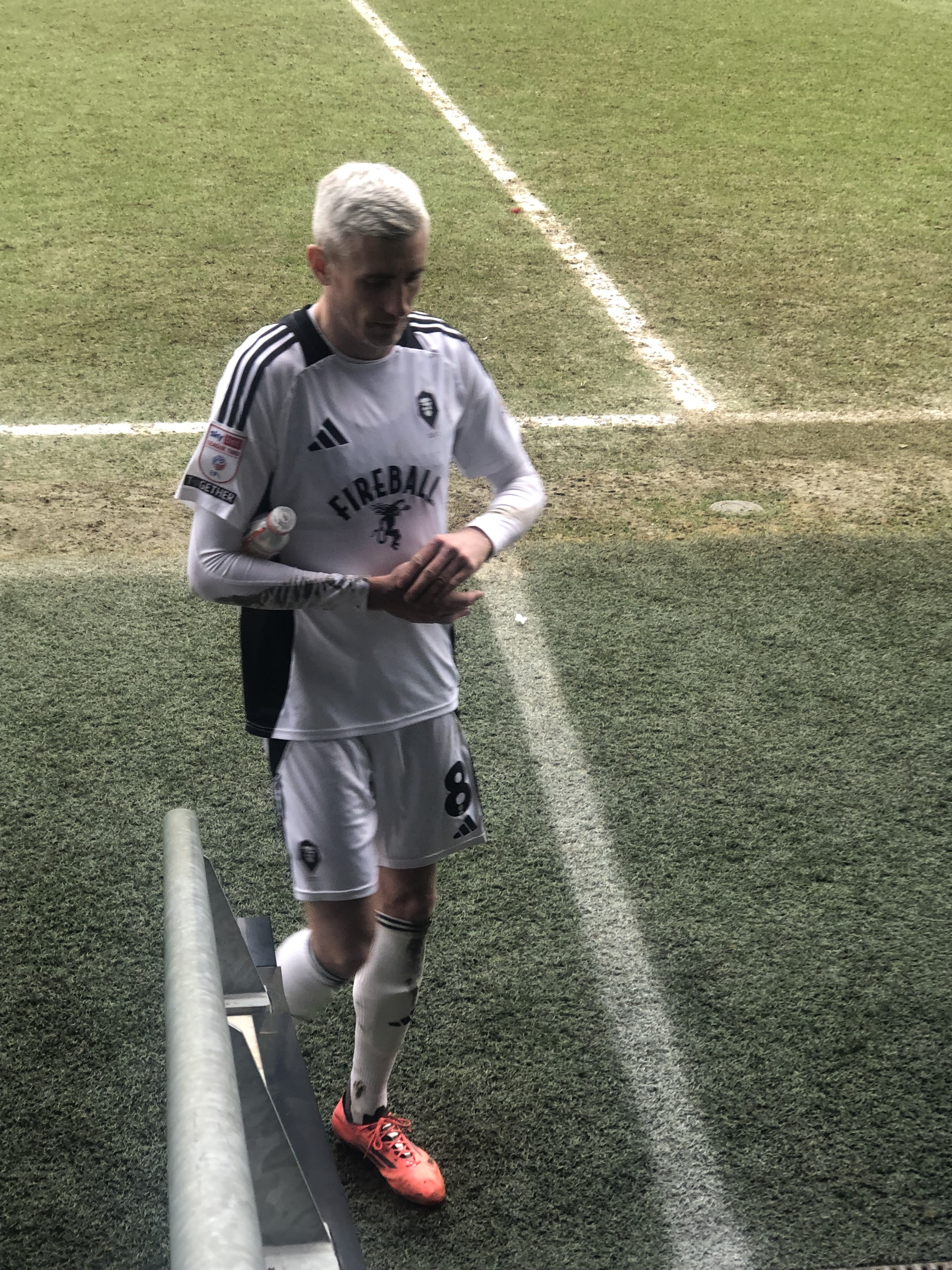
Lund playing for Salford City in 2025.

On 1 July 2021, Lund joined League Two side Salford City on a free transfer after turning down a new contract with Rochdale, signing a one-year deal with the option of a second. On 11 September, he scored his first goal for the club, scoring a last minute winner to beat Bradford City 1–0. on 31 October he scored a hat-trick against boyhood club Manchester United under 23s in the EFL Trophy in a 4-3 victory for Salford.

On 4 October 2024, Lund was appointed in the role of player-coach.

On 12 May 2025, the club announced he would be released in June when his contract expires.

== International career ==
Lund was called up to the Northern Ireland Under 21 side for the first time in February 2011. He was called up to the senior Northern Ireland squad for a UEFA Euro 2016 qualifier against Romania in November 2014. He was called up again in August 2016 for a 2018 FIFA World Cup qualifier against the Czech Republic.

== Style of play ==
Ian Henderson has described him as a player that is a "real good passer of the ball, he moves with the ball over distance, he can then chip in with a fair few goals too, a wise head on himself as well", and has described him as "exceptional" both offensively and defensively.

== Career statistics ==
=== Club ===
As of end of 2024–25 season

Appearances and goals by club, season and competition
Club	Season	League			FA Cup		League Cup		Other		Total	
Club	Season	Division	Apps	Goals	Apps	Goals	Apps	Goals	Apps	Goals	Apps	Goals
Stoke City	2009–10	Premier League	0	0	0	0	0	0	—		0	0
Stoke City	2010–11	Premier League	0	0	—		0	0	—		0	0
Stoke City	2011–12	Premier League	0	0	0	0	0	0	0	0	0	0
Stoke City	2012–13	Premier League	0	0	—		—		—		0	0
Stoke City	Total		0	0	0	0	0	0	0	0	0	0
Hereford United (loan)	2010–11	League Two	2	0	1	0	—		—		3	0
Oldham Athletic (loan)	2011–12	League One	3	0	—		—		—		3	0
Bristol Rovers (loan)	2011–12	League Two	13	2	—		—		—		13	2
Bristol Rovers (loan)	2012–13	League Two	18	2	1	0	1	0	—		20	2
Bristol Rovers (loan)	Total		31	4	1	0	1	0	0	0	33	4
Southend United (loan)	2012–13	League Two	12	1	—		—		1 (Note: Appearances in Football League Trophy)	0	13	1
Rochdale	2013–14	League Two	40	8	4	1	1	0	0	0	45	9
Rochdale	2014–15	League One	14	2	3	0	1	0	0	0	18	2
Rochdale	2015–16	League One	29	1	1	0	0	0	2	0	32	1
Rochdale	2016–17	League One	29	9	3	0	1	1	2 (Note: Appearances in EFL Trophy)	0	35	10
Rochdale	Total		112	20	11	1	3	1	4	0	130	22
Burton Albion	2017–18	Championship	12	1	0	0	2	1	—		14	2
Bradford City (loan)	2017–18	League One	10	2	—		—		—		10	2
Scunthorpe United	2018–19	League One	22	1	2	0	1	0	2	0	27	1
Scunthorpe United	2019–20	League Two	22	4	1	0	1	0	3	1	27	5
Scunthorpe United	Total		44	5	3	0	2	0	5	1	54	6
Rochdale	2019–20	League One	5	1	—		—		0	0	5	1
Rochdale	2020–21	League One	32	11	1	1	1	0	1	0	35	12
Rochdale	Total		37	16	1	1	1	0	1	0	40	13
Salford City	2021–22	League Two	40	7	2	0	1	0	0	0	43	7
Salford City	2022–23	League Two	28	7	2	0	1	0	5 (Note: Three appearances in EFL Trophy and two in League Two play-offs)	0	36	7
Salford City	2023–24	League Two	38	3	2	0	3	0	2	3	45	6
Salford City	2024–25	League Two	37	4	3	2	1	0	2	0	43	6
Salford City	Total		143	21	9	2	6	0	9	3	167	26
Career total			406	66	26	4	15	2	20	4	467	76

=== International ===
As of match played 2 June 2017

Appearances and goals by national team and year
National team	Year	Apps	Goals
Northern Ireland	2016	1	0
Northern Ireland	2017	2	0
Total		3	0
