= Calvin Andrew =

English footballer (born 1986)

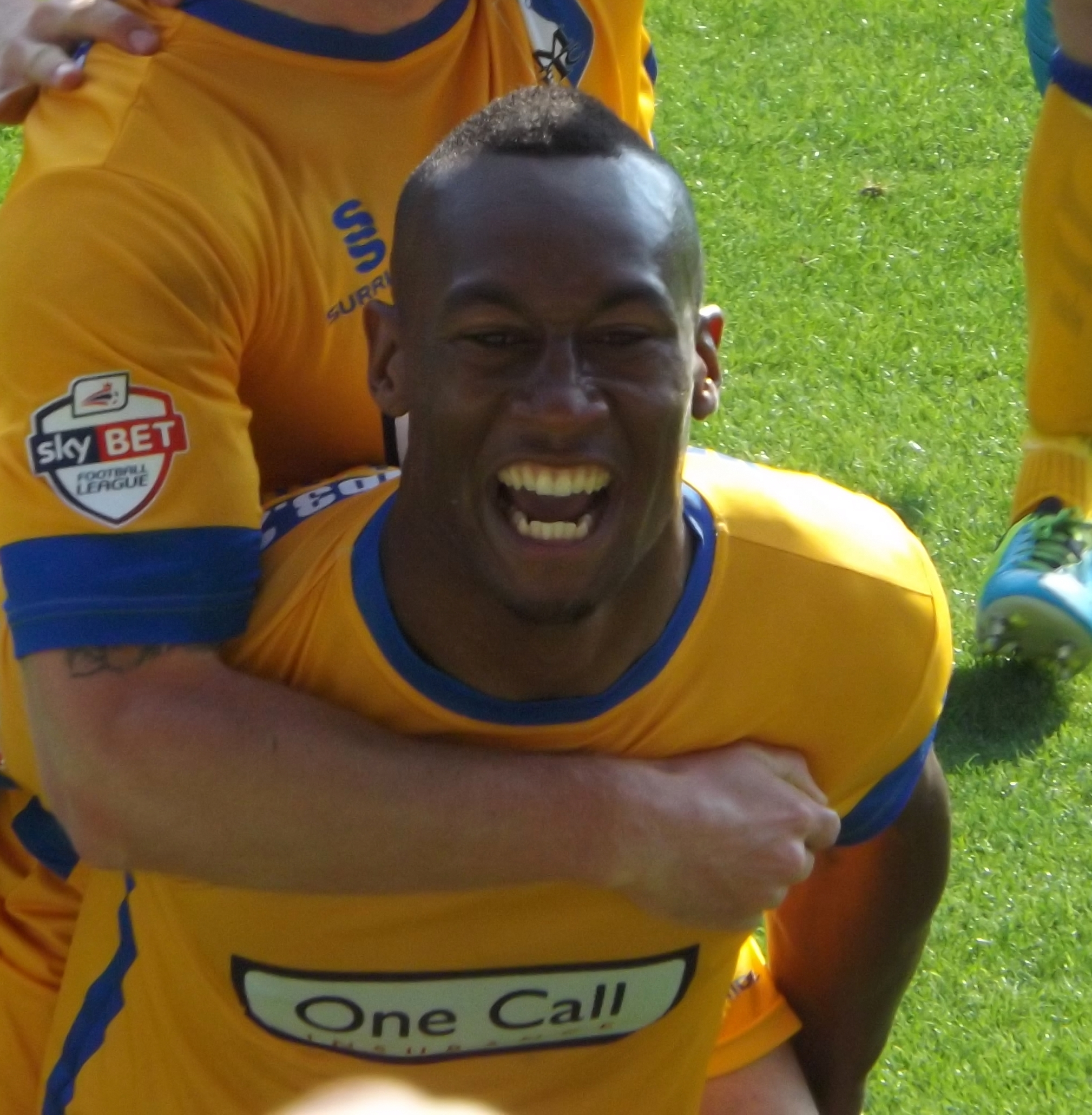
- Andrew playing for Mansfield Town in 2013

Personal information
- Full name: Calvin Hyden Andrew
- Date of birth: 19 December 1986 (age 39)
- Place of birth: Luton, England
- Height: 6 ft 2 in (1.88 m)
- Position: Striker

Youth career
- –2004: Luton Town

Senior career*
Years	Team	Apps	(Gls)
2004–2008	Luton Town	55	(4)
2005	→ Grimsby Town (loan)	8	(1)
2006	→ Bristol City (loan)	3	(0)
2008–2012	Crystal Palace	53	(2)
2009	→ Brighton & Hove Albion (loan)	9	(3)
2010	→ Millwall (loan)	3	(0)
2011	→ Swindon Town (loan)	10	(1)
2012	→ Leyton Orient (loan)	10	(0)
2012–2013	Port Vale	22	(1)
2013–2014	Mansfield Town	15	(1)
2014	York City	8	(1)
2014–2020	Rochdale	190	(24)
2021	Barrow	11	(1)
Total		397	(39)
- * Club domestic league appearances and goals

Calvin Hyden Andrew (born 19 December 1986) is an English former professional footballer who played as a striker.

Andrew began his career at Luton Town, debuting in the 2004–05 League One title-winning season. He was loaned out to Grimsby Town and Bristol City before becoming a first-team regular for Luton in the 2007–08 relegation season. He moved on to Championship club Crystal Palace, where injuries dogged him. He spent four years at Selhurst Park and spent time on loan at Brighton & Hove Albion, Millwall, Swindon Town, and Leyton Orient. He signed with Port Vale in November 2012 and helped the club to secure promotion out of League Two in 2012–13. He joined Mansfield Town for a brief stay in August 2013. He signed with York City for a brief spell in March 2014 before joining Rochdale four months later. He stayed at Rochdale for six seasons, making 231 league and cup appearances. He briefly joined Barrow in March 2021.

== Career ==
=== Luton Town ===
Born in Luton, Bedfordshire, Andrew began his career at Luton Town in their youth system and signed a professional contract with the club on 25 September 2004. He made his full first-team debut three days later, in a 2–0 defeat to Swansea City in a Football League Trophy match at Vetch Field. He made his League One debut on 7 December, replacing Rowan Vine 84 minutes into a 3–0 win over Wycombe Wanderers at Adams Park in the FA Cup. He made his first league start four days later, in a 1–0 victory over Port Vale at Kenilworth Road. He totalled 11 appearances in the 2004–05 season as Mike Newell's Luton were promoted as champions.

Andrew began 2005–06 on loan at League Two club Grimsby Town. He played nine matches for Grimsby, and scored his first goal in the English Football League on 27 August, in a 1–0 win over Barnet at Underhill. His loan spell at Blundell Park was ended on 20 November. He spent the second half of 2005–06 on loan at Gary Johnson's Bristol City, but because of a knee injury, he made just one start and two substitute appearances during his time at Ashton Gate. He returned to Luton to score in a 2–1 win over Plymouth Argyle at Home Park on 17 April. A knee ligament injury prevented him from featuring in the ill-fated 2006–07 season that saw Luton relegated from the Championship until the end of March. He featured seven times towards the end of the season, scoring once in a 3–1 win over Southend United at Roots Hall on 28 April.

He claimed four goals in 48 appearances playing under Kevin Blackwell and Mick Harford in 2007–08, as points deductions for financial irregularities led to massive problems on and off the field at Kenilworth Road and the club were relegated again as a result. Despite his low tally, Andrew's four goals were enough to win two FA Cup ties and three league points. Luton were deducted a record 30 points at the start of 2008–09, making a third relegation almost certain. With this in mind, the club needed to free up their wage bill and reduce further debt, so they decided to sell Andrew once their appeal was rejected.

=== Crystal Palace ===
Andrew moved to Neil Warnock's Crystal Palace on 18 July 2008 for a fee believed to be around £80,000. He played seven Championship matches for Palace, scoring one goal in a 4–2 defeat by Reading at the Madejski Stadium. In January 2009, Andrew signed on loan with League One club Brighton & Hove Albion until the end of the season, with manager Micky Adams looking for a physical presence to complement Nicky Forster up front. He scored a 90th-minute winner against Hartlepool United on his debut at the Withdean Stadium on 31 January. He had to return to Crystal Palace after tweaking his hamstring during his fourth game for Brighton. He then returned to Albion, now managed by his former Grimsby boss Russell Slade, to complete his loan spell and help the club to avoid relegation. However, his loan spell ended when he picked up a serious knee injury during a 1–0 win over Stockport County at the Withdean Stadium. Palace assistant manager Mick Jones said that it was "one of the worst injuries I have ever seen".

Andrew returned to first-team action with Palace in November. He went on to play 32 matches in the rest of 2009–10, scoring goals against Sheffield Wednesday and Preston North End. He began 2010–11 on the bench under new manager George Burley, and was loaned out to league rivals Millwall after recovering from a knee injury in November. He featured just three times for Kenny Jackett's Millwall, and spent only three weeks at The Den before being recalled to Palace on 13 December after the club lost loanee striker James Vaughan. He enjoyed another brief spell in and around the Palace first-team, before joining Swindon Town on loan in March after two months on the sidelines; the move reunited him with Paul Hart, who was Andrew's manager at Palace for a brief time in early 2010. He played 10 League One matches for Swindon as the lone striker in a 4–5–1 formation, scoring one goal in a 1–0 victory over Brentford at Griffin Park. He was given a new contract at the end of the season, having won over the fans with his hard-working style of play.

He featured five times for Palace at the start of 2011–12, but did not feature for ten weeks after scoring the winning goal in a 2–1 League Cup victory over Middlesbrough at Selhurst Park on 20 September. On 1 March, he signed for League One club Leyton Orient – and was reunited with manager Russell Slade – on loan until the end of the season. He failed to score in 10 matches for the Orient, though he only started two matches at Brisbane Road. He left Palace in May 2012 after manager Dougie Freedman rejected the opportunity to offer him a new contract. Andrew stated that "it's no one's fault but my own" for not making the most of the brief first-team opportunities he had been given.

On 2 August 2012, Andrew played for Crawley Town in a pre-season friendly with Charlton Athletic but failed to earn a contract with the club.

=== Port Vale ===
Andrew joined League Two club Port Vale on 26 November 2012 on a two-month contract; the move came days after the club failed to secure Lee Hughes on loan. The move reunited him with former Brighton manager Micky Adams, and Andrew said that "I think I'll do well here and score a lot of goals". Assistant manager Mark Grew said that his arrival was a "big plus" and that he would provide cover for top goalscorer Tom Pope as both players were "big and strong" strikers. He made his full debut at Vale Park on 4 December, in a 2–0 defeat to Bradford City in the Football League Trophy. Though often on the bench, he ended the month with "a hard-working and eye-catching display" on the left side of midfield in a 3–2 win over Dagenham & Redbridge. After his short-term contract expired, he agreed to extend his stay until the end of 2012–13. He scored his first goal for the Vale after he was given the rare chance to start a match as a striker on 23 February, in a 1–0 win over Torquay United at Plainmoor, after a Doug Loft shot deflected off Andrew into the net. Vale secured promotion with a third-place finish, with Andrew making 24 appearances. He was not offered a new contract at the end of the season and was released as a free agent.

=== Mansfield Town ===
Andrew signed with League Two club Mansfield Town following a trial period in August 2013. He scored his first goal for Mansfield on 28 September 2013, the only goal of the match against local rivals Chesterfield. However, this proved to be his only Mansfield goal in 2013–14, and he was released by the club on 6 January 2014, having made 16 appearances.

=== York City ===
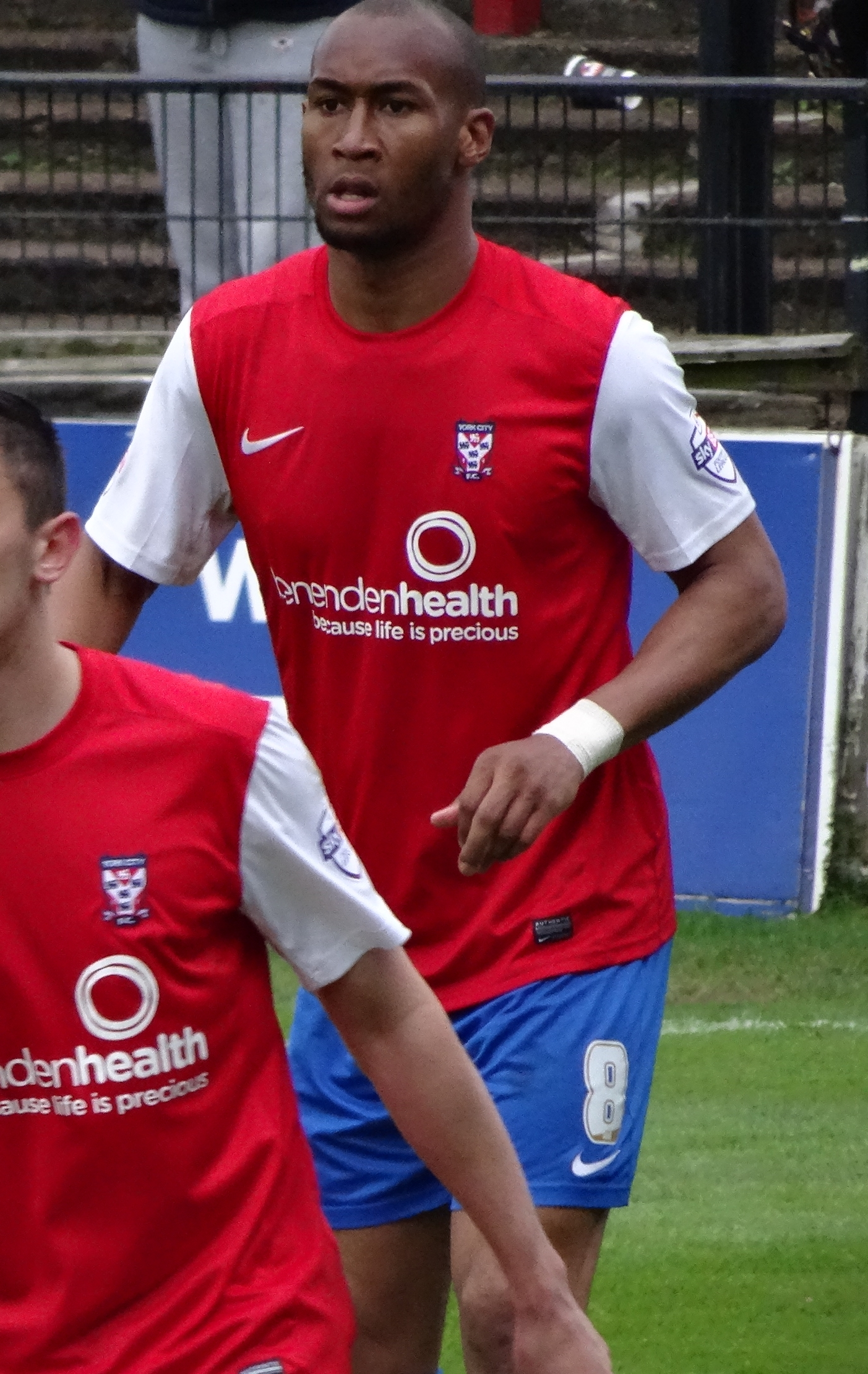
Andrew playing for York City in 2014

Andrew signed for another League Two club, York City, on a contract for the remainder of the season on 24 March 2014. He made his debut a day later as an 80th-minute substitute for Ryan Jarvis in a 1–0 home win over Torquay. The club released him in May 2014.

=== Rochdale ===
In July 2014, Andrew signed a two-year deal with newly promoted League One club Rochdale after impressing Keith Hill on a trial basis. He scored six goals in 41 appearances in 2014–15, including the only goal of the match against former club Port Vale on 6 April 2015 with a header from a Callum Camps in the fifth minute of stoppage time. On 2 January 2016, he scored a brace during a 3–0 win at Walsall and secured himself a place on the Football League team of the week. He scored six goals in 35 appearances in the 2015–16 season, and signed a new one-year contract in the summer.

On 29 October 2016, he elbowed Peter Clarke in the face during a 1–0 win over Oldham Athletic at Spotland; the incident was missed by the referee, but he was handed a 12-match suspension following a Football Association video review. This was the longest ban given to a professional footballer in England since Joey Barton received the same punishment in 2012. However, Andrew's suspension was later reduced to nine matches. He finished the 2016–17 season with seven goals in 43 appearances, and in December 2016 signed a contract extension until June 2018. He scored five goals in 40 appearances across the course of the 2017–18 campaign, having signed a one-year extension to his contract in November 2017 and then a further contract extension in June 2018 to keep him at the club until 2020. He contributed four goals from 43 appearances during the 2018–19 campaign. He won the League One PFA Player in the Community Award in March 2020; this followed his three successive PFA Community Champion awards from Rochdale. However, he was limited to just three league starts in the 2019–20 campaign and was released in June 2020.

=== Barrow ===
On 23 March 2021, Andrew joined League Two club Barrow until the end of the 2020–21 season. He started his first game for the "Bluebirds" on 27 April, where a 2–0 win at Forest Green Rovers secured Barrow's Football League status. However, he departed Holker Street in the summer as he was not offered a new contract by Barrow manager Mark Cooper.

== Style of play ==
In November 2012, Andrew described himself as "a pacey striker, I'm strong, I hold the ball up well, I can play in behind and go past people. I think I'll be quite exciting for the fans." In July 2014, Rochdale manager Keith Hill described him as "left footed with a good touch and had awareness of his team mates and the opposition".

== Media career ==
In August 2021, Andrew joined radio programme, BBC Squad Goals, as a co-presenter and continuing his playing career.

== Career statistics ==
Appearances and goals by club, season and competition
Club	Season	League			FA Cup		League Cup		Other		Total	
Club	Season	Division	Apps	Goals	Apps	Goals	Apps	Goals	Apps	Goals	Apps	Goals
Luton Town	2004–05	League One	8	0	2	0	0	0	1 (Note: Appearance(s) in Football League Trophy)	0	11	0
Luton Town	2005–06	Championship	1	1	0	0	—		—		1	1
Luton Town	2006–07	Championship	7	1	0	0	0	0	—		7	1
Luton Town	2007–08	League One	39	2	5	2	2	0	2	0	48	4
Luton Town	Total		55	4	7	2	2	0	3	0	67	6
Grimsby Town (loan)	2005–06	League Two	8	1	—		1	0	0	0	9	1
Bristol City (loan)	2005–06	League One	3	0	—		—		—		3	0
Crystal Palace	2008–09	Championship	7	1	1	0	2	0	—		10	1
Crystal Palace	2009–10	Championship	27	1	5	1	0	0	—		32	2
Crystal Palace	2010–11	Championship	13	0	1	0	1	0	—		15	0
Crystal Palace	2011–12	Championship	6	0	1	0	2	1	—		9	1
Crystal Palace	Total		53	2	8	1	5	1	0	0	66	4
Brighton & Hove Albion (loan)	2008–09	League One	9	3	—		—		1	0	10	3
Millwall (loan)	2010–11	Championship	3	0	—		—		—		3	0
Swindon Town (loan)	2010–11	League One	10	1	—		—		—		10	1
Leyton Orient (loan)	2011–12	League One	10	0	—		—		—		10	0
Port Vale	2012–13	League Two	22	1	1	0	0	0	1	0	24	1
Mansfield Town	2013–14	League Two	15	1	0	0	0	0	1	0	16	1
York City	2013–14	League Two	8	1	—		—		2 (Note: Appearances in League Two play-offs)	0	10	1
Rochdale	2014–15	League One	32	5	6	0	1	0	2	1	41	6
Rochdale	2015–16	League One	30	6	2	0	2	0	1	0	35	6
Rochdale	2016–17	League One	39	7	2	0	2	0	0	0	43	7
Rochdale	2017–18	League One	31	3	5	2	1	0	3 (Note: Appearance(s) in EFL Trophy)	0	40	5
Rochdale	2018–19	League One	38	3	2	0	2	0	1	1	43	4
Rochdale	2019–20	League One	20	0	4	0	3	0	2	0	29	0
Rochdale	Total		190	24	21	2	11	0	9	2	231	28
Barrow	2020–21	League Two	11	1	0	0	0	0	0	0	11	1
Career total			397	39	37	5	19	1	17	1	470	46

== Honours ==
Port Vale

- Football League Two third-place promotion: 2012–13
