= 2012–13 Tranmere Rovers F.C. season =

Tranmere Rovers F.C.
2012–13 season
- Chairman: Peter Johnson
- Manager: Ronnie Moore
- League One: 11th
- FA Cup: Third round
- Football League Cup: Second round
- Football League Trophy: First round
- Top goalscorer: League: Jake Cassidy (11); All: Jake Cassidy (11)
- Highest home attendance: 10,587 vs Milton Keynes Dons (16 November)
- Lowest home attendance: 4,342 vs Stevenage (24 March)
- Average home league attendance: 6,196 (10th in the league)
Home colours	Away colours

The 2012–13 season was the 112th season of competitive association football for Tranmere Rovers Football Club and their 86th season in the Football League. Based in Birkenhead, Wirral, the club competed in Football League One under Ronnie Moore in his first full season in charge.

== Season summary ==
Tranmere enjoyed a fine start to the season, standing top of League One at the end of January. Injuries to key players including Andy Robinson, Jean-Louis Akpa Akpro and captain James Wallace sparked a dramatic downturn in form. Tranmere fell to sixth by the end of March and finished the season 11th with no goals scored in their final six games.

== League One ==
=== League table ===
Pos	Team	Pld	W	D	L	GF	GA	GD	Pts
9	Walsall	46	17	17	12	65	58	+7	68
10	Crawley Town	46	18	14	14	59	58	+1	68
11	Tranmere Rovers	46	19	10	17	58	48	+10	67
12	Notts County	46	16	17	13	61	49	+12	65
13	Crewe Alexandra	46	18	10	18	54	62	−8	64

Updated to match(es) played on 27 April 2013. Source: BBC Sport
Rules for classification: 1) Points; 2) Goal difference; 3) Number of goals scored

Overall								Home						Away					
Pld	W	D	L	GF	GA	GD	Pts	W	D	L	GF	GA	GD	W	D	L	GF	GA	GD
46	19	10	17	58	48	+10	67	10	6	7	31	21	+10	9	4	10	27	27	0

Last updated: 3 May 2013.
Source: Football League Official Site

=== Results by matchday ===
Round	1	2	3	4	5	6	7	8	9	10	11	12	13	14	15	16	17	18	19	20	21	22	23	24	25	26	27	28	29	30	31	32	33	34	35	36	37	38	39	40	41	42	43	44	45	46
Ground	H	A	A	H	A	H	H	A	H	A	A	H	A	H	H	A	A	H	H	A	H	A	A	H	H	A	H	A	A	H	A	H	H	A	H	A	H	A	A	H	H	A	A	H	A	H
Result	W	W	D	W	D	W	W	W	D	W	W	W	L	L	D	W	W	L	D	D	D	D	L	W	W	W	W	L	W	L	L	L	L	W	D	L	W	L	L	W	L	L	L	L	L	D
Position	3	1	2	1	2	1	1	1	1	1	1	1	1	1	1	1	1	1	1	1	1	1	1	2	1	1	1	1	1	1	1	3	6	3	3	6	4	5	7	5	6	7	7	9	10	11

Updated to match(es) played on 3 May 2013. Source: Statto.com
A = Away; H = Home; W = Win; D = Draw; L = Loss

=== Matches ===
18 August 2012 1	Tranmere Rovers	3–1	Leyton Orient	Birkenhead
15:00	Bakayogo 34'; Akpa Akpro 57', 65'; Robinson (yellow card) 69'; Fon Williams (yellow card) 89'	TRFC Report; BBC Report	Cox (yellow card) 69'; Baudry (yellow card) 80'; Symes 88' (yellow card) 89'	Stadium: Prenton Park; Attendance: 5,063; Referee: Geoff Eltrigham

21 August 2012 2	Carlisle United	0–3	Tranmere Rovers	Carlisle
15:00	Berrett (yellow card) 61'; Livesey (yellow card) 66'; Thirlwell (yellow card) 68'; Symington (yellow card) 81'	TRFC Report; BBC Report	Robinson 12', 19', 66'; Palmer (yellow card) 39'; Holmes (yellow card) 59'	Stadium: Brunton Park; Attendance: 4,192; Referee: Graham Salisbury

25 August 2012 3	Shrewsbury Town	1–1	Tranmere Rovers	Shrewsbury
15:00	Hector (yellow card) 30'; Morgan 45+2'	TRFC Report; BBC Report	Akpa Akpro 88'	Stadium: New Meadow; Attendance: 6,253; Referee: Steven Rushton

1 September 2012 4	Tranmere Rovers	4–0	Colchester United	Birkenhead
15:00	Cassidy 40', 49', 77'; Bakayogo 58'	TRFC Report; BBC Report	Okuonghae (yellow card) 16'; Henderson (yellow card) 80'	Stadium: Prenton Park; Attendance: 4,711; Referee: Andrew Madley

8 September 2012 5	Crewe Alexandra	0–0	Tranmere Rovers	Crewe
15:00	Murphy (yellow card) 85'	TRFC Report; BBC Report	Wallace (yellow card) 90+2'	Stadium: Alexandra Stadium; Attendance: 5,740; Referee: Robert Madley

15 September 2012 6	Tranmere Rovers	2–0	Coventry City	Birkenhead
15:00	Cassidy 79'; Robinson 83' (yellow card) 84'	TRFC Report; BBC Report	Jennings (yellow card) 36'	Stadium: Prenton Park; Attendance: 6,087; Referee: Andy D'Urso

18 September 2012 7	Tranmere Rovers	3–0	Bury	Birkenhead
15:00	Robinson 35' (pen.) 68' (pen.) (yellow card) 62'; Cassidy 71'	TRFC Report; BBC Report	Lockwood (yellow card) 67'; Sodje (yellow card) 70'; Schumacher (yellow card) 79'	Stadium: Prenton Park; Attendance: 4,976; Referee: Trevor Kettle

22 September 2012 8	Crawley Town	2–5	Tranmere Rovers	Crawley
15:00	Simpson 12'; McFadzean 16'	TRFC Report; BBC Report	Holmes 2'; Taylor (yellow card) 29'; Cassidy 39', 53'; Akpa Akpro 46'; Robinson 90'	Stadium: Broadfield Stadium; Attendance: 3,099; Referee: Mike Russell

29 September 2012 9	Tranmere Rovers	1–1	Brentford	Birkenhead
15:00	Akpa Akpro 60'; Robinson (yellow card) 70'	TRFC Report; BBC Report	Logan (yellow card) 63'; Craig (yellow card) 77'; Douglas (yellow card) 79' (goal) 90+6'	Stadium: Prenton Park; Attendance: 5,720; Referee: Rob Lewis

2 October 2012 10	Scunthorpe United	1–3	Tranmere Rovers	Scunthorpe
15:00	Hawley 15'; Prutton (yellow card) 60'	TRFC Report; BBC Report	Wallace 64'; Akpa Akpro 66', 88'; Palmer (yellow card) 70'	Stadium: Glanford Park; Attendance: 2,768; Referee: Paul Tierney

6 October 2012 11	Notts County	0–1	Tranmere Rovers	Nottingham
15:00	Regan (yellow card) 49'; Bishop (yellow card) 51'	TRFC Report; BBC Report	Thompson 22'	Stadium: Meadow Lane; Attendance: 7,260; Referee: Tony Bates

13 October 2012 12	Tranmere Rovers	3–2	Yeovil Town	Birkenhead
15:00	Wallace (yellow card) 41' (goal) 45'; Cassidy 51'; Holmes 78' (yellow card) 79'	TRFC Report; BBC Report	Madden 9'; Burn (yellow card) 21'; Foley 29'; Smith (yellow card) 41'; Edwards (yellow card) 42' (yellow-red card) 73'; Marsh-Brown (yellow card) 90+3'	Stadium: Prenton Park; Attendance: 6,344; Referee: Kevin Wright

20 October 2012 13	Bournemouth	3–1	Tranmere Rovers	Bournemouth
19:45	Francis (yellow card) 17' (goal) 72'; Arter (yellow card) 31' (goal) 58'; Gibson 53' (o.g.); Pugh (yellow card) 75'; Partington (yellow card) 87'; Daniels (yellow card) 90+2'	TRFC Report; BBC Report	Jervis 39'; Bakayogo (yellow card) 45+2'	Stadium: Dean Court; Attendance: 6,233; Referee: David Phillips

23 October 2012 14	Tranmere Rovers	1–2	Doncaster Rovers	Birkenhead
15:00	Wallace (yellow card) 44'; Cassidy 87'	TRFC Report; BBC Report	Paynter 48'; Hume 90+2'	Stadium: Prenton Park; Attendance: 7,386; Referee: Scott Mathieson

27 October 2012 15	Tranmere Rovers	1–1	Preston North End	Birkenhead
15:00	Cassidy (yellow card) 20' (goal) 85'	TRFC Report; BBC Report	Monakana (yellow card) 9'; Huntington 50'; Keane (yellow card) 54'; Welsh (yellow card) 90+2'	Stadium: Prenton Park; Attendance: 7,732; Referee: Phil Gibbs

7 November 2012 16	Hartlepool United	0–2	Tranmere Rovers	Hartlepool
15:00	Richards (yellow card) 47'	TRFC Report; BBC Report	Robinson (yellow card) 10' (goal) 79' (pen.); Gibson (yellow card) 62'; Stockton 90+3'	Stadium: Victoria Park; Attendance: 3,285; Referee: Gary Sutton

10 November 2012 17	Oldham Athletic	0–1	Tranmere Rovers	Oldham
15:00	Furman (yellow card) 5'; Wesolowski (yellow card) 53'; Byrne (yellow card) 72'	TRFC Report; BBC Report	Taylor (yellow card) 40'; McGurk 54'; Palmer (yellow card) 74'; Kay (yellow card) 78'	Stadium: Boundary Park; Attendance: 5,159; Referee: Andy Woolmer

16 November 2012 18	Tranmere Rovers	0–1	Milton Keynes Dons	Birkenhead
19:45	Gibson (yellow card) 23'; Jervis (yellow card) 24'	TRFC Report; BBC Report	Gleeson 87'; Smith (yellow card) 90'	Stadium: Prenton Park; Attendance: 10,587; Referee: Michael Naylor

20 November 2012 19	Tranmere Rovers	0–0	Walsall	Birkenhead
15:00	Taylor (yellow card) 55'	TRFC Report; BBC Report	Brandy (yellow card) 69'	Stadium: Prenton Park; Attendance: 4,717; Referee: Jeremy Simpson

24 November 2012 20	Stevenage	1–1	Tranmere Rovers	Stevenage
15:00	Charles (yellow card) 25'; Tansey 90+2'	TRFC Report; BBC Report	Cassidy 78'	Stadium: Broadhall Way; Attendance: 3,069; Referee: James Adcock

8 December 2012 21	Tranmere Rovers	2–2	Portsmouth	Birkenhead
19:45	Taylor 31'; O'Halloran 74'	TRFC Report; BBC Report	McLeod (yellow card) 30'; Gyepes 50'; Jervis (yellow card) 75'; Russell (yellow card) 81'; Williamson (yellow card) 90+1'	Stadium: Prenton Park; Attendance: 5,591; Referee: David Webb

15 December 2012 22	Sheffield United	0–0	Tranmere Rovers	Sheffield
15:00		TRFC Report; BBC Report	McGurk (yellow card) 89'	Stadium: Bramall Lane; Attendance: 19,163; Referee: Eddie Ilderton

21 December 2012 23	Swindon Town	5–0	Tranmere Rovers	Swindon
15:00	Hollands 4'; De Vita 7'; Williams 21', 51'; Ritchie 33'	TRFC Report; BBC Report		Stadium: County Ground; Attendance: 8,885; Referee: Tony Bates

26 December 2012 24	Tranmere Rovers	2–1	Crewe Alexandra	Birkenhead
15:00	McGurk 58'; Power 63'; Bakayogo (yellow card) 66'	TRFC Report; BBC Report	Inman 12'; Davis (yellow card) 90+3'	Stadium: Prenton Park; Attendance: 7,252; Referee: Paul Tierney

29 December 2012 25	Tranmere Rovers	1–0	Scunthorpe United	Birkenhead
15:00	Stockton 59'	TRFC Report; BBC Report	Barcham (yellow card) 36'; Djeziri (yellow card) 45'; Reid (yellow card) 78'	Stadium: Prenton Park; Attendance: 6,044; Referee: Andy Davies

1 January 2013 26	Bury	0–1	Tranmere Rovers	Bury
15:00	Worrall (yellow card) 45+3'	TRFC Report; BBC Report	Robinson 56'; Daniels (yellow card) 75'	Stadium: Gigg Lane; Attendance: 3,208; Referee: Nigel Miller

12 January 2013 27	Tranmere Rovers	2–0	Crawley Town	Birkenhead
15:00	Amoo 30'; Bakayogo 39'; Daniels (yellow card) 73'	TRFC Report; BBC Report	Hunt (yellow card) 47'; Bulman (yellow card) 67'	Stadium: Prenton Park; Attendance: 5,011; Referee: Lee Mason

16 January 2013 28	Coventry City	1–0	Tranmere Rovers	Coventry
19:45	Clarke 20'	TRFC Report; BBC Report	Bakayogo (yellow card) 58'; Holmes (yellow card) 81'	Stadium: Ricoh Arena; Attendance: 9,668; Referee: Gavin Ward

19 January 2013 29	Brentford	1–2	Tranmere Rovers	Brentford
15:00	Dean (yellow card) 41' (goal) 50'; Douglas (yellow card) 75'; Bidwell (yellow card) 90+1'	TRFC Report; BBC Report	Robinson 42' (pen.); Bakayogo (yellow card) 56'; McGurk 66' (yellow card) 75'; Fon Williams (yellow card) 75'; Power (yellow card) 90+3'	Stadium: Griffin Park; Attendance: 6,948; Referee: Darren Deadman

2 February 2013 30	Tranmere Rovers	0–1	Carlisle United	Birkenhead
15:00	Akpa Akpro (red card) 36'; Holmes (yellow card) 67'	TRFC Report; BBC Report	Loy 44'	Stadium: Prenton Park; Attendance: 5,713; Referee: Tony Harrington

9 February 2013 31	Leyton Orient	2–1	Tranmere Rovers	Leyton
15:00	McDonald 9'; Rowlands 67'; Smith (yellow card) 90+2'	TRFC Report; BBC Report	O'Halloran 75'	Stadium: Brisbane Road; Attendance: 4,351; Referee: Trevor Kettle

15 February 2013 32	Tranmere Rovers	0–2	Shrewsbury Town	Birkenhead
15:00	Palmer (red card) 6'; Taylor (yellow card) 52'	TRFC Report; BBC Report	Porter 10'; Gayle 67'	Stadium: Prenton Park; Attendance: 9,127; Referee: Mark Brown

19 February 2013 33	Tranmere Rovers	1–3	Swindon Town	Birkenhead
15:00	Daniels 78'	TRFC Report; BBC Report	Collins 48'; Roberts 71', 90+3'; McEveley (yellow card) 79'	Stadium: Prenton Park; Attendance: 5,223; Referee: Chris Sarginson

23 February 2013 34	Colchester United	1–5	Tranmere Rovers	Colchester
15:00	Okuonghae 29'; Thompson (yellow card) 65'	TRFC Report; BBC Report	Power 11'; Akpa Akpro 41'; Corry (yellow card) 48'; Taylor 65'; Stockton 85'; O'Halloran 90+1'	Stadium: Colchester Community Stadium; Attendance: 3,077; Referee: Keith Stroud

26 February 2013 35	Tranmere Rovers	1–1	Notts County	Birkenhead
19:45	Bell-Baggie 29'; Power (yellow card) 88'	TRFC Report; BBC Report	Bishop 74'; Judge (yellow card) 76'	Stadium: Prenton Park; Attendance: 4,703; Referee: Scott Duncan

2 March 2013 36	Yeovil Town	1–0	Tranmere Rovers	Yeovil
15:00	Upson 58'; Madden (yellow card) 74'	TRFC Report; BBC Report	Bakayogo (yellow card) 9'; Holmes (yellow card) 58'; Goodison (yellow card) 74'; Amoo (yellow card) 80'	Stadium: Huish Park; Attendance: 4,862; Referee: Darren Sheldrake

9 March 2013 37	Tranmere Rovers	1–0	Oldham Athletic	Birkenhead
15:00	Goodison (yellow card) 9'; Power 61' (yellow card) 64'	TRFC Report; BBC Report	Brown (yellow card) 11'; Tarkowski (yellow card) 18'	Stadium: Prenton Park; Attendance: 5,560; Referee: Tim Robinson

12 March 2013 38	Walsall	2–0	Tranmere Rovers	Walsall
19:45	Grigg 50' (pen.); Westcarr 57' (yellow card) 60'; Brandy (yellow card) 60'	TRFC Report; BBC Report	Holmes (yellow card) 51'; Power (yellow card) 60'	Stadium: Bescot Stadium; Attendance: 3,775; Referee: Graham Salisbury

16 March 2013 39	Milton Keynes Dons	3–0	Tranmere Rovers	Milton Keynes
15:00	Lewington 9'; Kay (yellow card) 14'; Gleeson 43'; Potter 51'; Chicksen (yellow card) 81'	TRFC Report; BBC Report		Stadium: Stadium:mk; Attendance: 9,682; Referee: Oliver Langford

24 March 2013 40	Tranmere Rovers	3–1	Stevenage	Birkenhead
15:00	Bakayogo 10', 38'; Gibson 17'	TRFC Report; BBC Report	Freeman 12'; Gray (yellow card) 16'; Dunne (yellow card) 25'	Stadium: Prenton Park; Attendance: 4,342; Referee: Graham Scott

29 March 2013 41	Tranmere Rovers	0–1	Sheffield United	Birkenhead
15:00	Sidibé (yellow card) 77'	TRFC Report; BBC Report	Flynn (yellow card) 38'; Maguire (yellow card) 40'; Taylor 42' (o.g.)	Stadium: Prenton Park; Attendance: 9,145; Referee: Andy Haines

1 April 2013 42	Portsmouth	1–0	Tranmere Rovers	Portsmouth
19:45	Connolly 53'	TRFC Report; BBC Report	Gibson (yellow card) 49'	Stadium: Fratton Park; Attendance: 12,014; Referee: Andrew Madley

6 April 2013 43	Doncaster Rovers	1–0	Tranmere Rovers	Doncaster
15:00	Jones 63'	TRFC Report; BBC Report	McGinty (yellow card) 53'; Taylor (yellow card) 63'	Stadium: Keepmoat Stadium; Attendance: 7,979; Referee: David Coote

13 April 2013 44	Tranmere Rovers	0–1	Hartlepool United	Birkenhead
19:45	Gibson (yellow card) 9'; Power (yellow card) 21'	TRFC Report; BBC Report	Austin 10'; Monkhouse (yellow card) 40'; Rutherford (yellow card) 90+2'	Stadium: Prenton Park; Attendance: 4,721; Referee: Lee Collins

20 April 2013 45	Preston North End	1–0	Tranmere Rovers	Preston
15:00	Monakana 45+3'	TRFC Report; BBC Report	O'Halloran (yellow card) 34'	Stadium: Deepdale; Attendance: 10,467; Referee: Carl Boyeson

27 April 2013 46	Tranmere Rovers	0–0	Bournemouth	Birkenhead
15:00		TRFC Report; BBC Report	Arter (yellow card) 88'	Stadium: Prenton Park; Attendance: 6,745; Referee: Eddie Ilderton

== FA Cup ==
13 November 2012 First round	Braintree Town (5)	0–3	Tranmere Rovers	Braintree
19:45		TRFC Report; BBC Report	Thompson 24'; Stockton 53'; Power 90'	Stadium: Cressing Road; Attendance: 1,503; Referee: Dean Whitestone

1 December 2012 Second round	Tranmere Rovers	2–1	Chesterfield (4)	Birkenhead
15:00	Stockton 42' (yellow card) 71'; McGurk 57'; Gibson (yellow card) 65'; Goodison (yellow card) 70'; Fon Williams (yellow card) 86'	TRFC Report; BBC Report	Cooper 31'; Boa Morte (yellow card) 54'; Darikwa (yellow card) 64'; Hird (yellow card) 76'	Stadium: Prenton Park; Attendance: 3,781; Referee: Robert Madley

5 January 2013 Third round	Derby County (2)	5–0	Tranmere Rovers	Derby
15:00	Davies 42'; Sammon 54'; Brayford 63'; Hendrick 72'; Bennett 87'	TRFC Report; BBC Report		Stadium: Pride Park Stadium; Attendance: 11,740; Referee: Mark Halsey

== Football League Cup ==
14 August 2012 First round	Chesterfield (4)	1–2 (a.e.t.)	Tranmere Rovers	Chesterfield
19:45	Trotman (yellow card) 27'; Hird (yellow card) 44'; Togwell (yellow card) 66'; Whataker (yellow card) 81'; Lester 109'	TRFC Report; BBC Report	Bakayogo (yellow card) 74'; Stockton 93'; Bell-Baggie 120+2'; Wallace (yellow card) 120+3'	Stadium: Proact Stadium; Attendance: 3,088; Referee: David Webb

28 August 2012 Second round	Aston Villa (1)	3–0	Tranmere Rovers	Birmingham
19:45	Delph 38' (yellow card) 77'; Herd 66'; Bent 81'	TRFC Report; BBC Report	Taylor (yellow card) 28'; Holmes (yellow card) 85'	Stadium: Villa Park; Attendance: 15,319; Referee: James Adcock

== Football League Trophy ==
4 September 2012 First round	Port Vale (4)	2–0	Tranmere Rovers	Burslem
19:45	Morsy (yellow card) 29'; Myrie-Williams 57', 75' (pen.)	TRFC Report; BBC Report	Golobart (yellow card) 74'	Stadium: Vale Park; Attendance: 2,702; Referee: Steve Martin

== Players ==
Transfers, contract extensions and loans are listed from the last day of the previous season till the final day of this season

=== Transfers ===
In
Date	Player	Age	Previous club	Ends	Fee
7 June 2012	(England) Danny Harrison	29	Rotherham United	1 July 2013	Free
19 June 2012	(France) Jean-Louis Akpa Akpro	27	Rochdale	1 July 2014	Free
26 June 2012	(England) James Wallace	20	Everton	1 July 2014	Undisclosed
5 July 2012	(England) Paul Black	22	Oldham Athletic	1 July 2013	Free
26 July 2012	(Northern Ireland) Jason Mooney	23	Wycombe Wanderers	1 July 2013	Free
1 August 2012	(Sierra Leone) Abdulai Bell-Baggie	20	Salisbury City	1 July 2013	Free
3 August 2012	(England) Joe Thompson	23	Rochdale	1 July 2014	Free
9 January 2013	(England) David Amoo	21	Preston North End	1 July 2013	Free

Out
Date	Player	Age	Status	Next club	Fee
8 May 2012	(England) Joss Labadie	21	Released	Notts County	Free
8 May 2012	(England) Enoch Showunmi	30	Released	Notts County	Free
8 May 2012	(Republic of Ireland) Martin Devaney	31	Released	Kidderminster Harriers	Free
8 May 2012	(Northern Ireland) Robbie Weir	23	Released	Burton Albion	Free
8 May 2012	(England) Andy Coughlin	19	Released	Wrexham	Free
8 May 2012	(England) Mustafa Tiryaki	25	Released	1461 Trabzon	Free
8 May 2012	(England) David Raven	27	Released	Inverness Caledonian Thistle	Free
14 May 2012	(England) John Welsh	28	Transfer	Preston North End	Free
24 May 2012	(Northern Ireland) David Buchanan	26	Transfer	Preston North End	Free
3 August 2012	(England) Lucas Akins	23	Transfer	Stevenage	Undisclosed
20 November 2012	(England) Will Vaulks	19	Released	Falkirk	Free
3 January 2013	(Northern Ireland) Mark McChrystal	28	Released	Bristol Rovers	Free
29 April 2013	(England) Paul Black	23	Released	Mansfield Town	Free
29 April 2013	(England) Danny Harrison	30	Released	Chester	Free
29 April 2013	(England) Adam McGurk	24	Released	Burton Albion	Free
29 April 2013	(England) David Amoo	22	Released	Carlisle United	Free
29 April 2013	(England) Michael Kay	23	Released	Chester	Free

=== Contract extensions ===
Date	Player	Age	Ends
11 May 2012	(Wales) Ian Goodison	39	1 July 2013
11 May 2012	(Wales) Ash Taylor	21	1 July 2014
16 May 2012	(England) Andy Robinson	32	1 July 2013
29 January 2013	(England) Cole Stockton	18	1 July 2015
31 January 2013	(England) Jake Kirby	18	1 July 2015
7 February 2013	(England) Danny Holmes	24	1 July 2015
4 March 2013	(England) Max Power	19	1 July 2015
7 March 2013	(Sierra Leone) Abdulai Bell-Baggie	20	1 July 2015

=== Loans ===
In
Player	Age	Signed from	Date	
Player	Age	Signed from	Started	Ended
(Scotland) Liam Palmer	20	Sheffield Wednesday	17 July	end of the season
(Wales) Jake Cassidy	19	Wolverhampton Wanderers	2 August	1 January
(England) Ben Gibson	19	Middlesbrough	14 August	13 December
(Spain) Román Golobart	20	Wigan Athletic	31 August	3 October
(England) Jake Jervis	21	Birmingham City	20 October	19 November
(England) Nathan Eccleston	21	Blackpool	25 October	19 November
(Montserrat) Donervon Daniels	18	West Bromwich Albion	22 November	19 March
(Scotland) Michael O'Halloran	21	Bolton Wanderers	22 November	end of the season
(Republic of Ireland) Paul Corry	22	Sheffield Wednesday	15 February	18 March
(Mali) Mamady Sidibé	33	Stoke City	21 February	end of the season
(England) Ben Gibson	20	Middlesbrough	14 March	end of the season
(Republic of Ireland) Sean McGinty	19	Manchester United	28 March	end of the season

Out
Player	Age	Signed to	Date	
Player	Age	Signed to	Started	Ended
(England) Will Vaulks	18	Workington	21 August	20 November
(Northern Ireland) Mark McChrystal	28	Scunthorpe United	20 November	24 December
(England) Joe Thompson	23	Rochdale	1 March	4 April

=== Season statistics ===
No.	Nat	Player	Total		League One		FA Cup		League Cup		League Trophy		Discipline		Signed^{†}		
No.	Nat	Player	A	G	A	G	A	G	A	G	A	G	Booked	Sent off (straight red)	Status	Joined	Left
Goalkeepers
1	(Wales)	Owain Fôn Williams	51+0	–	45+0	–	3+0	–	2+0	–	1+0	–	3	–	–	–	–
23	(England)	Sam Ramsbottom	–	–	–	–	–	–	–	–	–	–	–	–	youth	–	–
33	(Northern Ireland)	Jason Mooney	1+0	–	1+0	–	–	–	–	–	–	–	–	–	–	–	–
Defenders
2	(England)	Danny Holmes	49+0	2	43+0	2	3+0	–	2+0	–	1+0	–	7	–	–	–	–
3	(England)	Paul Black	2+9	–	2+8	–	0+1	–	–	–	–	–	–	–	–	–	29.04
4	(Wales)	Ash Taylor	47+0	2	44+0	2	2+0	–	1+0	–	–	–	6	–	–	–	–
5	(Jamaica)	Ian Goodison	10+2	–	9+1	–	1+1	–	–	–	–	–	3	–	–	–	–
14	(Ivory Coast)	Zoumana Bakayogo	52+0	5	46+0	5	3+0	–	2+0	–	1+0	–	6	–	–	–	–
18	(Northern Ireland)	Mark McChrystal	–	–	–	–	–	–	–	–	–	–	–	–	–	–	03.01
19	(England)	Michael Kay	4+5	–	3+3	–	–	–	1+1	–	0+1	–	1	–	–	–	29.04
20	(England)	Will Vaulks	–	–	–	–	–	–	–	–	–	–	–	–	–	–	20.11
21	(England)	Ben Gibson	33+0	1	28+0	1	2+0	–	2+0	–	1+0	–	5	–	loan	– 14.03	13.12 –
23	(Spain)	Román Golobart	2+0	–	1+0	–	–	–	–	–	1+0	–	–	–	loan	31.08	03.10
23	(Montserrat)	Donervon Daniels	11+3	1	10+3	1	1+0	–	–	–	–	–	2	–	loan	22.11	19.03
27	(Republic of Ireland)	Sean McGinty	3+0	–	3+0	–	–	–	–	–	–	–	1	–	loan	28.03	–
Midfielders
6	(Scotland)	Liam Palmer	45+1	–	42+1	–	1+0	–	2+0	–	–	–	3	1	loan	–	–
7	(England)	Joe Thompson	11+13	2	7+12	1	1+1	1	2+0	–	1+0	–	–	–	–	–	–
8	(England)	James Wallace	23+0	2	19+0	2	2+0	–	2+0	–	–	–	4	–	–	–	–
10	(England)	Andy Robinson	38+0	10	33+0	10	3+0	–	2+0	–	–	–	5	–	–	–	–
12	(England)	Danny Harrison	7+11	–	4+9	–	2+0	–	0+2	–	1+0	–	–	–	–	–	29.04
15	(England)	Jake Kirby	0+6	–	0+4	–	0+1	–	–	–	0+1	–	–	–	–	–	–
17	(England)	Max Power	27+5	4	25+2	3	1+2	1	0+1	–	1+0	–	5	–	–	–	–
22	(Sierra Leone)	Abdulai Bell-Baggie	21+13	2	20+11	1	–	–	0+2	1	1+0	–	–	–	–	–	–
24	(Republic of Ireland)	Paul Corry	5+1	–	5+1	–	–	–	–	–	–	–	1	–	loan	15.02	18.03
Forwards
9	(Wales)	Jake Cassidy	28+0	11	26+0	11	–	–	1+0	–	1+0	–	1	–	loan	–	01.01
11	(Northern Ireland)	Adam McGurk	23+7	4	20+7	3	2+0	1	–	–	1+0	–	2	–	–	–	29.04
16	(England)	Cole Stockton	9+27	6	5+26	3	3+0	2	1+0	1	0+1	–	1	–	–	–	–
18	(England)	David Amoo	6+5	1	6+5	1	–	–	–	–	–	–	1	–	–	09.01	29.04
20	(Scotland)	Michael O'Halloran	19+6	3	17+6	3	2+0	–	–	–	–	–	1	–	loan	22.11	–
24	(England)	Jake Jervis	5+0	1	4+0	1	1+0	–	–	–	–	–	1	–	loan	20.10	19.11
25	(England)	Nathan Eccleston	1+0	–	1+0	–	–	–	–	–	–	–	–	–	loan	25.10	19.11
23	(Mali)	Mamady Sidibé	10+0	–	10+0	–	–	–	–	–	–	–	1	–	loan	21.02	–
26	(France)	Jean-Louis Akpa Akpro	29+1	8	27+1	8	–	–	2+0	–	–	–	–	1	–	–	–
		Own goals		–		–		–		–		–					
		Total	52	65	46	58	3	5	2	2	1	0	60	2			

^{†} Statuses are mentioned for youth academy players without senior contract and players who were signed on non-contract basis or on loan. Dates joined and left are mentioned only for players who changed club between the first and the last matchday of the season.

Last updated: 27 April 2013.
Source: 11v11.com
