= 2012–13 Football League One =

Football League One
- Season: 2012–13
- Champions: Doncaster Rovers (1st divisional title)
- Promoted: Doncaster Rovers; Bournemouth; Yeovil Town
- Relegated: Scunthorpe United; Portsmouth; Hartlepool United; Bury
- Matches: 552
- Goals: 1,367 (2.48 per match)
- Top goalscorer: Paddy Madden (23 goals)
- Biggest home win: Preston North End 5–0 Hartlepool United; Swindon Town 5–0 Portsmouth; Swindon Town 5–0 Tranmere Rovers
- Biggest away win: Hartlepool United 0–5 Coventry City
- Highest scoring: 8 goals Sheffield United 5–3 Bournemouth
- Longest winning run: 8 games Bournemouth; Yeovil Town
- Longest unbeaten run: 16 games Sheffield United
- Longest winless run: 22 games Portsmouth
- Longest losing run: 9 games Colchester United, Portsmouth
- Highest attendance: 23,431; Sheffield United v Brentford (16 April 2013)
- Lowest attendance: 1,396; Bury v Stevenage (19 March 2013)
- Average attendance: 6,319

The 2012–13 Football League One (referred to as the Npower Football League One for sponsorship reasons) was the ninth season of the league under its current title and twenty-first season under its current league division format. The season began on 18 August 2012 and ended on 27 April 2013.

== Changes from last season ==
=== Team changes ===
==== To League One ====
Relegated from the Championship

- Portsmouth
- Coventry City
- Doncaster Rovers

Promoted from League Two

- Swindon Town
- Shrewsbury Town
- Crawley Town
- Crewe Alexandra

==== From League One ====
Promoted to the Championship

- Charlton Athletic
- Sheffield Wednesday
- Huddersfield Town

Relegated to League Two

- Wycombe Wanderers
- Chesterfield
- Exeter City
- Rochdale

== League table ==
Pos	Team	Pld	W	D	L	GF	GA	GD	Pts	Promotion, qualification or relegation
1	Doncaster Rovers (C, P)	46	25	9	12	62	44	+18	84	Promotion to Football League Championship
2	Bournemouth (P)	46	24	11	11	76	53	+23	83	Promotion to Football League Championship
3	Brentford	46	21	16	9	62	47	+15	79	Qualification for League One play-offs (Note: Four teams play for one spot and promotion to Football League Championship.)
4	Yeovil Town (O, P)	46	23	8	15	71	56	+15	77	Qualification for League One play-offs
5	Sheffield United	46	19	18	9	56	42	+14	75	Qualification for League One play-offs
6	Swindon Town	46	20	14	12	72	39	+33	74	Qualification for League One play-offs
7	Leyton Orient	46	21	8	17	55	48	+7	71	
8	Milton Keynes Dons	46	19	13	14	62	45	+17	70	
9	Walsall	46	17	17	12	65	58	+7	68	
10	Crawley Town	46	18	14	14	59	58	+1	68	
11	Tranmere Rovers	46	19	10	17	58	48	+10	67	
12	Notts County	46	16	17	13	61	49	+12	65	
13	Crewe Alexandra	46	18	10	18	54	62	−8	64	
14	Preston North End	46	14	17	15	54	49	+5	59	
15	Coventry City	46	18	11	17	66	59	+7	55 (Note: On 28 March Coventry City were deducted ten points for entering administration.)	
16	Shrewsbury Town	46	13	16	17	54	60	−6	55	
17	Carlisle United	46	14	13	19	56	77	−21	55	
18	Stevenage	46	15	9	22	47	64	−17	54	
19	Oldham Athletic	46	14	9	23	46	59	−13	51	
20	Colchester United	46	14	9	23	47	68	−21	51	
21	Scunthorpe United (R)	46	13	9	24	49	73	−24	48	Relegation to Football League Two
22	Bury (R)	46	9	14	23	45	73	−28	41	Relegation to Football League Two
23	Hartlepool United (R)	46	9	14	23	39	67	−28	41	Relegation to Football League Two
24	Portsmouth (R)	46	10	12	24	51	69	−18	32 (Note: On 20 April Portsmouth were deducted ten points after coming out of administration.)	Relegation to Football League Two

Updated to match(es) played on 27 April 2013. Source: BBC Sport
Rules for classification: 1) Points; 2) Goal difference; 3) Number of goals scored
(C) Champions; (O) Play-off winners; (P) Promoted; (R) Relegated

== Play-offs ==
Semifinals
3	Brentford (p)	1	3	4 (5)
6	Swindon Town	1	3	4 (4)
4	Yeovil Town	0	2	2
5	Sheffield United	1	0	1

Final
3	Brentford	1
4	Yeovil Town	2

== Team overview ==
=== Stadia and locations ===
Locations of League One 2012–13 teams

Team	Location	Stadium	Capacity
Bournemouth	Bournemouth	Dean Court	10,700
Brentford	Brentford, Greater London	Griffin Park	12,763
Bury	Bury	Gigg Lane	11,840
Carlisle United	Carlisle	Brunton Park	16,981
Colchester United	Colchester	Colchester Community Stadium	10,064
Coventry City	Coventry	Ricoh Arena	32,609
Crawley Town	Crawley	Broadfield Stadium	5,996
Crewe Alexandra	Crewe	Alexandra Stadium	10,153
Doncaster Rovers	Doncaster	Keepmoat Stadium	15,231
Hartlepool United	Hartlepool	Victoria Park	8,240
Leyton Orient	Leyton, Greater London	Brisbane Road	9,271
Milton Keynes Dons	Milton Keynes	Stadium:mk	22,000
Notts County	Nottingham	Meadow Lane	21,388
Oldham Athletic	Oldham	Boundary Park	10,638
Portsmouth	Portsmouth	Fratton Park	20,224
Preston North End	Preston	Deepdale	23,408
Scunthorpe United	Scunthorpe	Glanford Park	9,088
Sheffield United	Sheffield	Bramall Lane	32,702
Shrewsbury Town	Shrewsbury	Greenhous Meadow	9,875
Stevenage	Stevenage	Broadhall Way	6,722
Swindon Town	Swindon	County Ground	15,728
Tranmere Rovers	Birkenhead	Prenton Park	16,789
Walsall	Walsall	Bescot Stadium	11,300
Yeovil Town	Yeovil	Huish Park	9,565

=== Personnel and sponsoring ===
Note: Flags indicate national team as has been defined under FIFA eligibility rules. Players may hold more than one non-FIFA nationality.

Team	Manager^{1}	Team captain	Kit manufacturer	Shirt sponsor
Bournemouth	Eddie Howe	Miles Addison	Fila	Energy Consulting
Brentford	Uwe Rösler	Kevin O'Connor	Puma	SkyeX
Bury	Kevin Blackwell	Steven Schumacher	Surridge	Bury Council
Carlisle United	Greg Abbott	Lee Miller	Fila	Eddie Stobart Transport
Colchester United	Joe Dunne	Kemal Izzet	Puma	Sponsors on a match-by-match basis (H); JobServe (A)
Coventry City	Steven Pressley	Carl Baker	Puma	City Link
Crawley Town	Richie Barker	Josh Simpson	Puma	Global Freight Solutions
Crewe Alexandra	Steve Davis	Luke Murphy	Carbrini	Mornflake Oats
Doncaster Rovers	Paul Dickov	Rob Jones	Nike	One Call Insurance
Hartlepool United	Colin Cooper	Sam Collins	Nike	Dove Energy
Leyton Orient	Russell Slade	Nathan Clarke	Nike	Samsung (H); FIFA 13 (A)
Milton Keynes Dons	Karl Robinson	Dean Lewington	Vandanel	Case Security
Notts County	Chris Kiwomya	Neal Bishop	Fila	3663 (H); Vision Express (A & 3rd)
Oldham Athletic	Lee Johnson	Dean Furman	Fila	Carbrini
Portsmouth	Guy Whittingham	Johnny Ertl	Kappa	Jobsite
Preston North End	Simon Grayson	John Mousinho	Puma	Magners (H); Tennent's Lager (A)
Scunthorpe United	Brian Laws	Paul Reid	Nike	Rainham Steel
Sheffield United	David Weir	Michael Doyle	Macron	Westfield Health (H); Redtooth (A & 3rd)
Shrewsbury Town	Graham Turner	Matt Richards	Joma	Greenhous
Stevenage	Graham Westley	Mark Roberts	Puma	Stapleton's Tyres
Swindon Town	Kevin MacDonald	Alan McCormack	Adidas	Samsung (H); FIFA 13 (A)
Tranmere Rovers	Ronnie Moore	James Wallace	Fila	Wirral
Walsall	Dean Smith	Andy Butler	Diadora	SR Timber Merchants
Yeovil Town	Gary Johnson	Jamie McAllister	Vandanel	W+S Recycling

- ^{1} According to current revision of List of English Football League managers

=== Managerial changes ===
Team	Outgoing manager	Manner of departure	Date of vacancy	Position in table	Incoming manager	Date of appointment
Bournemouth	Lee Bradbury	Sacked	25 March 2012	Pre-season	Paul Groves	11 May 2012
Crawley Town	Steve Evans	Signed by Rotherham United	9 April 2012	Pre-season	Sean O'Driscoll	16 May 2012
Crawley Town	Sean O'Driscoll	Signed by Nottingham Forest	19 July 2012	Pre-season	Richie Barker	7 August 2012
Bury	Richie Barker	Signed by Crawley Town	7 August 2012	Pre-season	Kevin Blackwell	26 September 2012
Coventry City	Andy Thorn	Sacked	26 August 2012	14th	Mark Robins	19 September 2012
Colchester United	John Ward	Sacked	24 September 2012	22nd	Joe Dunne	27 September 2012
Bournemouth	Paul Groves	Sacked	3 October 2012	20th	Eddie Howe	12 October 2012
Hartlepool United	Neale Cooper	Resigned	24 October 2012	24th	John Hughes	14 November 2012
Scunthorpe United	Alan Knill	Sacked	29 October 2012	22nd	Brian Laws	30 October 2012
Portsmouth	Michael Appleton	Signed by Blackpool	7 November 2012	17th	Guy Whittingham	24 April 2013
Doncaster Rovers	Dean Saunders	Signed by Wolverhampton Wanderers	6 January 2013	2nd	Brian Flynn	17 January 2013
Oldham Athletic	Paul Dickov	Resigned	3 February 2013	20th	Lee Johnson	18 March 2013
Notts County	Keith Curle	Sacked	3 February 2013	10th	Chris Kiwomya	23 February 2013
Preston North End	Graham Westley	Sacked	13 February 2013	17th	Simon Grayson	18 February 2013
Coventry City	Mark Robins	Signed by Huddersfield Town	14 February 2013	8th	Steven Pressley	8 March 2013
Swindon Town	Paolo Di Canio	Resigned	18 February 2013	6th	Kevin MacDonald	28 February 2013
Stevenage	Gary Smith	Sacked	20 March 2013	15th	Graham Westley	30 March 2013
Sheffield United	Danny Wilson	Sacked	10 April 2013	5th	David Weir	10 June 2013
Doncaster Rovers	Brian Flynn	Appointed as "Director of Football"	3 May 2013	1st	Paul Dickov	20 May 2013
Hartlepool United	John Hughes	Sacked	9 May 2013	24th	Colin Cooper	24 May 2013

== Results ==
Home \ Away	BOU	BRE	BRY	CRL	COL	COV	CRA	CRE	DON	HAR	LEY	MKD	NTC	OLD	POR	PNE	SCU	SHU	SHR	STE	SWI	TRA	WAL	YEO
Bournemouth		2–2	4–1	3–1	1–0	0–2	3–0	3–1	1–2	1–1	2–0	1–1	3–1	4–1	2–0	1–1	1–0	0–1	2–1	1–1	1–1	3–1	1–2	3–0
Brentford	0–0		2–2	2–1	1–0	2–1	2–1	5–1	0–1	2–2	2–2	3–2	2–1	1–0	3–2	1–0	1–0	2–0	0–0	2–0	2–1	1–2	0–0	1–3
Bury	2–2	0–0		1–1	1–2	0–2	0–2	2–2	2–0	2–1	0–2	1–4	0–2	0–1	2–0	1–2	2–1	0–2	2–2	2–0	0–1	0–1	1–1	3–2
Carlisle United	2–4	2–0	2–1		0–2	1–0	0–2	0–0	1–3	3–0	1–4	1–1	0–4	3–1	4–2	1–1	1–1	1–3	2–2	2–1	2–2	0–3	0–3	3–3
Colchester United	0–1	1–3	2–0	2–0		1–3	1–1	1–2	1–2	3–1	2–1	0–2	0–2	0–2	2–2	1–0	1–2	1–1	0–0	1–0	0–1	1–5	2–0	2–0
Coventry City	1–0	1–1	2–2	1–2	2–2		3–1	1–2	1–0	1–0	0–1	1–1	1–2	2–1	1–1	1–1	1–2	1–1	0–1	1–2	1–2	1–0	5–1	0–1
Crawley Town	3–1	1–2	3–2	1–1	3–0	2–0		2–0	1–1	2–2	1–0	2–0	0–0	1–1	0–3	1–0	3–0	0–2	2–2	1–1	1–1	2–5	2–2	0–1
Crewe Alexandra	1–2	0–2	1–0	1–0	3–2	1–0	2–0		1–2	2–1	1–1	2–1	1–2	0–2	1–2	1–0	1–0	1–0	1–1	1–2	2–1	0–0	2–0	0–1
Doncaster Rovers	0–1	2–1	2–1	0–2	1–0	1–4	0–1	0–2		3–0	2–0	0–0	0–1	1–0	1–1	1–3	4–0	2–2	1–0	1–1	1–0	1–0	1–2	1–1
Hartlepool United	1–2	1–1	2–0	1–2	0–0	0–5	0–1	3–0	1–1		2–1	0–2	2–1	1–2	0–0	0–1	2–0	1–2	2–2	0–2	0–0	0–2	0–0	0–0
Leyton Orient	3–1	1–0	2–0	4–1	0–2	0–1	0–1	1–1	0–2	1–0		2–0	2–1	1–1	1–0	2–0	1–3	0–1	2–1	0–1	0–0	2–1	2–1	4–1
Milton Keynes Dons	0–3	2–0	1–1	2–0	5–1	2–3	0–0	1–0	3–0	1–0	1–0		1–1	2–0	2–2	1–1	0–1	1–0	2–3	0–1	2–0	3–0	2–4	1–0
Notts County	3–3	1–2	4–1	1–0	3–1	2–2	1–1	1–1	0–2	2–0	1–1	1–2		1–0	3–0	0–1	1–0	1–1	3–2	1–2	1–0	0–1	0–1	1–2
Oldham Athletic	0–1	0–2	1–2	1–2	1–1	0–1	2–1	1–2	1–2	3–0	2–0	3–1	2–2		1–0	3–1	1–1	0–2	1–0	0–1	0–2	0–1	1–1	1–0
Portsmouth	1–1	0–1	2–0	1–1	2–3	2–0	1–2	2–0	0–1	1–3	2–3	1–1	0–2	0–1		0–0	2–1	3–0	3–1	0–0	1–2	1–0	1–2	1–2
Preston North End	2–0	1–1	0–0	1–1	0–0	2–2	1–2	1–3	0–3	5–0	0–0	0–0	0–0	2–0	1–1		3–0	0–1	1–2	2–0	4–1	1–0	1–3	3–2
Scunthorpe United	1–2	1–1	1–2	3–1	1–0	1–2	2–1	1–2	2–3	1–2	2–1	0–3	2–2	2–2	2–1	2–3		1–1	0–0	1–0	3–1	1–3	1–1	0–4
Sheffield United	5–3	2–2	1–1	0–0	3–0	1–2	0–2	3–3	0–0	2–3	0–0	0–0	1–1	1–1	1–0	0–0	3–0		1–0	4–1	2–0	0–0	1–0	0–2
Shrewsbury Town	0–3	0–0	0–0	2–1	2–2	4–1	3–0	1–0	1–2	1–1	0–2	2–2	2–2	1–0	3–2	1–0	0–1	1–2		2–1	0–1	1–1	1–0	1–3
Stevenage	0–1	1–0	2–2	1–1	0–2	1–3	1–2	2–2	1–2	1–0	0–1	0–2	2–0	1–2	2–1	1–4	1–0	4–0	1–1		0–4	1–1	3–1	0–2
Swindon Town	4–0	0–1	0–1	4–0	0–1	2–2	3–0	4–1	1–1	1–1	0–1	1–0	0–0	1–1	5–0	1–1	1–1	0–0	2–0	3–0		5–0	2–2	4–1
Tranmere Rovers	0–0	1–1	3–0	0–1	4–0	2–0	2–0	2–1	1–2	0–1	3–1	0–1	1–1	1–0	2–2	1–1	1–0	0–1	0–2	3–1	1–3		0–0	3–2
Walsall	3–1	2–2	1–1	1–2	1–0	4–0	2–2	2–2	0–3	1–1	1–2	1–0	1–1	3–1	2–0	3–1	1–4	1–1	3–1	1–0	0–2	2–0		2–2
Yeovil Town	0–1	3–0	2–1	1–3	3–1	1–1	2–2	1–0	2–1	1–0	3–0	2–1	0–0	4–1	1–2	3–1	3–0	0–1	2–1	1–3	0–2	1–0	0–0	

Updated to match(es) played on 27 April 2013. Source: The Football League
Legend: Blue = home team win; Yellow = draw; Red = away team win.

== Season statistics ==
=== Top scorers ===
As of 27 April 2013

Rank	Player	Club	Goals
1	(Republic of Ireland) Paddy Madden	Yeovil Town^{1}	23
2	(England) Leon Clarke	Coventry City^{2}	19
2	(Northern Ireland) Will Grigg	Walsall	19
2	(Jersey) Brett Pitman	Bournemouth	19
5	(Jamaica) Clayton Donaldson	Brentford	18
6	(Jamaica) Kevin Lisbie	Leyton Orient	16
6	(Republic of Ireland) David McGoldrick	Coventry City	16
8	(England) James Hayter	Yeovil Town	14
9	(England) Jose Baxter	Oldham Athletic	13
9	(Republic of Ireland) James Collins	Swindon Town	13
9	(England) Lewis Grabban	Bournemouth	13
9	(England) Billy Paynter	Doncaster Rovers	13

1. - includes 1 goal for Carlisle United
2. - includes 11 goals for Scunthorpe United

=== Assists ===
As of 27 April 2013

Rank	Player	Club	Assists
1	(Wales) David Cotterill	Doncaster Rovers	20
2	(England) Mark Duffy	Scunthorpe United	15
3	(England) Dean Cox	Leyton Orient	14
4	(England) Lee Croft	Oldham Athletic	12
5	(England) Dean Bowditch	Milton Keynes Dons	11
5	(Republic of Ireland) Alan Judge	Notts County	11
5	(Scotland) Matt Ritchie	Bournemouth	11
8	(England) Evan Horwood	Hartlepool	10
8	(England) Marvin Morgan	Shrewsbury Town	10
8	(England) Luke Murphy	Crewe Alexandra	10
8	(England) Ed Upson	Yeovil Town	10

=== Hat-tricks ===
Player	For	Against	Result	Date
(England) Andy Robinson	Tranmere Rovers	Carlisle United	0–3	21 August 2012
(Wales) Jake Cassidy	Tranmere Rovers	Colchester United	4–0	1 September 2012
(England) Dean Bowditch	Milton Keynes Dons	Bury	1–4	22 September 2012
(England) Nicky Wroe	Preston North End	Scunthorpe United	2–3	23 October 2012
(Spain) Dani Lopez	Stevenage	Sheffield United	4–0	16 March 2013

=== Scoring ===
- First goal of the season: David McAllister for Sheffield United against Shrewsbury Town (18 August 2012)
- Fastest goal of the season: 56 seconds, A-Jay Leitch-Smith for Crewe Alexandra against Scunthorpe United (21 August 2012)
- Latest goal of the season: 95 minutes and 26 seconds, Paddy Madden for Carlisle United against Portsmouth (25 August 2012)
- Largest winning margin: 5 goals
  - Preston North End 5–0 Hartlepool United (18 September 2012)
  - Hartlepool United 0–5 Coventry City (17 November 2012)
  - Swindon Town 5–0 Tranmere Rovers (21 December 2012)
  - Swindon Town 5–0 Portsmouth (1 January 2013)
- Highest scoring game: 8 goals
  - Sheffield United 5–3 Bournemouth (1 September 2012)
- Most goals scored in a match by a single team: 5 goals
  - Brentford 5–1 Crewe Alexandra (25 August 2012)
  - Sheffield United 5–3 Bournemouth (1 September 2012)
  - Preston North End 5–0 Hartlepool United (18 September 2012)
  - Crawley Town 2–5 Tranmere Rovers (22 September 2012)
  - Hartlepool United 0–5 Coventry City (17 November 2012)
  - Milton Keynes Dons 5–1 Colchester United (24 November 2012)
  - Coventry City 5–1 Walsall (8 December 2012)
  - Swindon Town 5–0 Portsmouth (1 January 2013)
  - Colchester United 1–5 Tranmere Rovers (23 February 2013)
- Most goals scored in a match by a losing team: 3 goals
  - Sheffield United 5–3 Bournemouth (1 September 2012)

=== Clean sheets ===
- Most clean sheets: 21
  - Sheffield United
- Fewest clean sheets: 5
  - Scunthorpe United

=== Discipline ===
- Most yellow cards (club): 92
  - Oldham Athletic
- Most yellow cards (player): 12
  - Harry Arter (AFC Bournemouth)
- Most red cards (club): 7
  - Notts County
- Most red cards (player): 3
  - Antony Kay (Milton Keynes Dons)

== Awards ==
=== Monthly awards ===
Month	Manager of the Month		Player of the Month		Reference
Month	Manager	Club	Player	Club	Reference
August	(England) Ronnie Moore	Tranmere Rovers	(England) Andy Robinson	Tranmere Rovers	
September	(England) Ronnie Moore	Tranmere Rovers	(Wales) Jake Cassidy	Tranmere Rovers	
October	(Northern Ireland) Danny Wilson	Sheffield United	(England) George Long	Sheffield United	
November	(England) Eddie Howe	Bournemouth	(Jamaica) Kevin Lisbie	Leyton Orient	
December	(England) Mark Robins	Coventry City	(Republic of Ireland) David McGoldrick	Coventry City	
January	(England) Dean Smith	Walsall	(Republic of Ireland) Paddy Madden	Yeovil Town	
February	(Scotland) John Hughes	Hartlepool United	(England) Peter Hartley	Hartlepool United	
March	(England) Russell Slade	Leyton Orient	(Jersey) Brett Pitman	Bournemouth	
April	(England) Eddie Howe	Bournemouth	(England) Matt Smith	Oldham Athletic	

=== Other awards ===
Month	Award	Player	Club	Notes
August	Young Player of the Month	(England) Max Clayton	Crewe Alexandra	
September	Young Player of the Month	(England) George Bowerman	Walsall	
February	Young Player of the Month	(England) George Long	Sheffield United	
