= Jake Kirby =

English footballer

Personal information
- Full name: Jake Antony Kirby
- Date of birth: 9 May 1994 (age 32)
- Place of birth: Liverpool, England
- Height: 5 ft 11 in (1.80 m)
- Position: Midfielder

Team information
- Current team: Nantwich Town

Youth career
- Tranmere Rovers

Senior career*
Years	Team	Apps	(Gls)
2012–2018	Tranmere Rovers	98	(8)
2015	→ Stockport County (loan)	11	(4)
2018–2019	Stockport County	42	(8)
2023–	Nantwich Town	0	(0)
- * Club domestic league appearances and goals as of 10:26, 21 October 2023 (UTC)

Jake Antony Kirby (born 9 May 1994) is an English professional footballer who plays as a midfielder for Northern Premier League Division One West club Nantwich Town.

== Career ==
Kirby came through Tranmere Rovers's youth system and was awarded his first professional one-year contract by the club in April 2012.

He made his Football League debut against Scunthorpe United on 5 May 2012 as a substitute for Jake Cassidy, playing the last 15 minutes of the match. He made six more appearances in the first half of the next season before being offered a new two-and-a-half-year contract.

The next season Kirby became regular first-team player, making 35 appearances and scoring two first senior goals against Coventry City, one away and one at home as Tranmere finished 21st in the division and relegated to the League Two.

One year until contract expire, Kirby extended it till summer 2017 on 26 May 2014. The 2014/15 campaign saw Rovers relegated from Football League, while Kirby made 20 appearances and scored a goal - winning one against Northampton Town.

On 28 August 2015 Kirby was loaned to the National League North side Stockport County, where he reunited with former teammates Kayode Odejayi, Andy Robinson and Abdulai Bell-Baggie. Following day he made his County debut as a substitute. On 31 September, Stockport beat AFC Fylde 3-2 after Kirby scored the winning goal in the fifth minute of stoppage time. Initial one-month loan was later extended to three months. On 26 November he was recalled to the parent club. He was released by Tranmere at the end of the 2017–18 season and went to Stockport County for a second spell in that summer.

He retired in September 2019.

In October 2023, Kirby made his return to football when he joined Northern Premier League Division One West club Nantwich Town.

== Playing style ==
He can play in five positions: central midfield, right midfield, left midfield, behind the striker and as a striker.

== Statistics ==
As of match played 30 April 2016.

Club	Season	League			FA Cup		League Cup		Other		Total	
Club	Season	Division	Apps	Goals	Apps	Goals	Apps	Goals	Apps	Goals	Apps	Goals
Tranmere Rovers	2011–12	League One	1	0	—		—		—		1	0
Tranmere Rovers	2012–13	League One	4	0	1	0	—		1 (Note: Appearance in the Football League Trophy)	0	6	0
Tranmere Rovers	2013–14	League One	31	2	2	0	1	0	1	0	35	2
Tranmere Rovers	2014–15	League Two	17	1	1	0	—		2	0	20	1
Tranmere Rovers	2015–16	National League	15	3	0	0	0	0	1	0	16	3
Tranmere Rovers	Total		69	6	4	0	1	0	4	0	76	6
Stockport County (loan)	2015–16	National League North	11	4	0	0	0	0	0	0	11	4
Career total			80	10	4	0	1	0	4	0	88	10
