= Cole Stockton =

English footballer (born 1994)

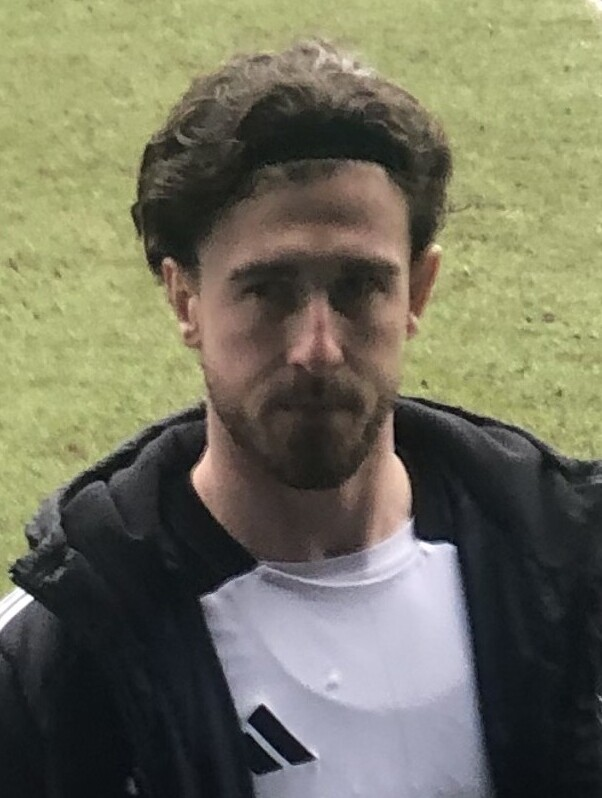
- Cole Stockton in 2025.

Personal information
- Full name: Cole John Stockton
- Date of birth: 13 March 1994 (age 32)
- Place of birth: Huyton, England
- Height: 6 ft 1 in (1.86 m)
- Position: Forward

Team information
- Current team: Accrington Stanley
- Number: 13

Youth career
- –2011: Tranmere Rovers

Senior career*
Years	Team	Apps	(Gls)
2011–2017	Tranmere Rovers	97	(14)
2011–2012	→ Vauxhall Motors (loan)	4	(1)
2012	→ Vauxhall Motors (loan)	4	(0)
2015	→ Southport (loan)	10	(3)
2016	→ Morecambe (loan)	7	(2)
2016–2017	→ Morecambe (loan)	19	(5)
2017–2018	Heart of Midlothian	12	(0)
2018	Carlisle United	12	(1)
2018–2019	Tranmere Rovers	16	(1)
2019	→ Wrexham (loan)	5	(0)
2019–2023	Morecambe	153	(52)
2023–2024	Burton Albion	10	(0)
2024	→ Barrow (loan)	17	(7)
2024–2026	Salford City	49	(17)
2026–	Accrington Stanley	0	(0)
- * Club domestic league appearances and goals as of 00:52, 7 December 2025 (UTC)

Cole John Stockton (born 13 March 1994) is an English professional footballer who plays as a forward for EFL League Two club Accrington Stanley.

Stockton overcame a serious bout of septicaemia and began his career at Tranmere Rovers. He made his debut in senior football on loan at Vauxhall Motors during the 2011–12 season and turned professional at Tranmere in April 2012. He spent the 2015–16 season on loan at Southport and Morecambe, and also spent the first half of the 2016–17 campaign on loan at Morecambe. He returned to Tranmere and helped the club to reach the play-off final, where they were beaten by Forest Green Rovers. He left Tranmere at the end of his contract, moving from the National League to the Scottish Premiership after being signed by Heart of Midlothian in June 2017. He returned to the English Football League with Carlisle United in January 2018, before leaving Carlisle to rejoin Tranmere Rovers eight months later. He spent the second half of the 2018–19 season on loan at Wrexham. He rejoined Morecambe in June 2019. He scored six goals and fifteen goals in the 2019–20 and 2020–21 seasons, before scoring 26 goals in 50 appearances during the 2021–22 campaign; this scoring record earned him two successive League One Player of the Month and Goal of the Month awards and a place on the PFA Team of the Year.

== Early life ==
Stockton suffered a life-threatening bout of septicaemia during a trial with Tranmere Rovers at the age of thirteen. Whilst he was recovering from this illness, his father, Stephen, died from a disease of the liver.

== Career ==
=== Tranmere Rovers ===
Stockton came through Tranmere Rovers' youth system. He joined Vauxhall Motors in the Conference North on loan in November 2011. Tranmere manager Les Parry said that the experience would toughen up the teenager as he "will get kicked and elbowed". He made his debut as a late substitute, in the club's FA Trophy victory over Marine on 26 November. He scored three times whilst on loan, twice in a 4–4 draw with Kidderminster Harriers, and the winning goal in a 3–2 victory over Worcester City. He was recalled to Tranmere after the club underwent an injury crisis. He made his debut for Tranmere on 17 January 2012, coming on as an 84th-minute substitute for Lucas Akins in a 0–0 draw with Rochdale in a League One fixture at Prenton Park. He returned to Vauxhall Motors on a second one-month loan spell on 11 February, as striker Leighton McGivern was unavailable. He was awarded his first professional contract by Tranmere in April.

On 15 August 2012, Stockton scored on his first start for Tranmere in a 2–1 win over Chesterfield in the League Cup. His first Football League goal for the club came on 7 November, in a 2–0 victory at Hartlepool United. He was singled out for praise by manager Ronnie Moore after scoring a goal and setting up a further two goals in a 3–0 win at Braintree Town in the FA Cup first round on 13 November. He signed a new two-and-a-half-year contract in January. He ended the 2012–13 season with six goals from nine starts and twenty-seven substitute appearances. He started five games and made twenty-one substitute appearances in the 2013–14 campaign, scoring goals against Bolton Wanderers, Brentford and Walsall.

Stockton signed a new long-term deal on 26 August 2014, keeping him at the club until the summer of 2017. Four days later he scored two goals against Morecambe as Tranmere won the game 2–1; manager Rob Edwards commented that Stockton was in good form but was "frustrating at times" due to his slow "progress in his game and his ability and touch". On 3 January, Stockton scored a late goal against Premier League side Swansea City as Tranmere lost 6–2 and were knocked out of FA Cup; manager Micky Adams had commented before the game that "the likes of Max Power and Cole Stockton can show people they are good players". However, the following month he was ruled out of action for six weeks after undergoing a hernia operation. He ended the 2014–15 season with six goals in nineteen starts and eight substitute appearances as Rovers were relegated out of the Football League.

He enjoyed a good pre-season and went into the 2015–16 campaign as manager Gary Brabin's only target man striker. Despite this, on 18 September he joined Paul Carden's National League rivals Southport on a three-month loan deal. He made his debut for the "Sandgrounders" the following day against FC Halifax Town, and scored a goal in a 2–2 draw. On 3 October, he scored both of Port's goals in a 2–1 victory at Woking. He played two games for Tranmere after returning from Haig Avenue. On 17 March 2016, he joined League Two side Morecambe on an initial 28-day loan. He remained at the Globe Arena until the end of the 2015–16 season, scoring two goals in seven games.

In July 2016, he re-joined Morecambe on loan ahead of the 2016–17 season. He scored ten goals in twenty-six games for the "Shrimps", before he returned to Tranmere in January. He went on to help Rovers secure a place in the play-offs with a second-place finish, scoring five goals in sixteen league games, as well as four appearances and five goals in the FA Trophy after he scored a hat-trick in a 5–1 win over Barrow. He then scored two goals in a 5–2 aggregate victory over Aldershot Town in the play-off semi-finals. He went on to play in the play-off final defeat to Forest Green Rovers at Wembley Stadium, missing three second half chances – "denied by a brilliant low saved" from goalkeeper Sam Russell, missing an open goal, and having a glancing header go wide of the post. Manager Micky Mellon was disappointed to lose Stockton after he chose to leave the club on a free transfer.

=== Heart of Midlothian ===
Stockton signed for Scottish Premiership club Heart of Midlothian on a pre-contract on 2 June 2017, joining on a two-year deal on 1 July after his Tranmere contract came to an end. Hearts struggled at the start of the 2017–18 season and Stockton criticised outgoing manager Ian Cathro's training methods and claimed that interim manager Jon Daly had improved his fitness. In December, Stockton was criticised for attending a party in blackface to impersonate Mr. T, and he subsequently apologised. Speaking later that month, manager Craig Levein said that Stockton must get stronger and improve his hold up play in order to secure more game time. He failed to score in four starts and eleven substitute appearances for Hearts, and was allowed to leave Tynecastle by mutual consent on 26 January 2018.

=== Carlisle United ===
On 26 January 2018, Stockton signed for League Two club Carlisle United. Manager Keith Curle had attempted to sign him the previous summer. He made his debut for the "Cumbrians" the following day, coming on as a 77th-minute substitute in a 1–0 win over Forest Green Rovers at Brunton Park. On 3 February, he scored in his first start for the "Blues", in a 4–3 defeat at Wycombe Wanderers. This was his only goal in ten starts and two substitute appearances in the second half of the 2017–18 campaign. He left the club by mutual consent on 2 August 2018 as new manager John Sheridan looked to free up money in the wage bill for new signings.

=== Return to Tranmere Rovers ===
On 2 August 2018, Stockton re-signed for Tranmere Rovers – newly promoted to League Two – on a one-year contract. He made fifteen starts and five substitute appearances in the first half of the 2018–19 season. On 7 January 2019, he joined National League club Wrexham on loan until the end of the 2018–19 season; he stated that he aimed to win promotion with Bryan Hughes's "Red Dragons". However he made just one start and seven substitute appearances in the league for Wrexham, scoring one goal against Gateshead, and did not feature in the play-off quarter-final defeat to Eastleigh.

=== Return to Morecambe ===
On 12 June 2019, Stockton signed for Morecambe. Manager Jim Bentley said that: "he's had a couple of up and down seasons at various clubs but we feel he has good strengths that will help us improve". He scored six goals in 27 starts and eight substitute appearances in the 2019–20 campaign, which was ended prematurely due to the COVID-19 pandemic in England with Morecambe in 22nd place; Stockton was the club's top goalscorer having scored one more cup goal than Lewis Alessandra.

He scored fifteen goals in 46 starts and three substitute appearances in the 2020–21 season, with Carlos Mendes Gomes beating his goal tally by a single goal. Morecambe qualified for the play-offs with a fourth-place finish, having missed out on automatic promotion by one point. They played Stockton's former club Tranmere Rovers in the play-off semi-finals, and won 3–2 on aggregate; Stockton provided an assist for Liam McAlinden in the first leg victory at Prenton Park. They went on to beat Newport County 1–0 in the play-off final at Wembley, with Mendes Gomes scoring the winning goal from the penalty spot in extra time. In June, he signed a two-year deal with the club following promotion to League One.

Stockton was given the EFL League One Player of the Month award for August 2021 after scoring four goals in five matches. This award came the day after he won the Goal of the Month award for his opening day finish at Ipswich Town. This impressive start to the season continued for Stockton and after five goals in September, Stockton was again awarded the division's Player of the Month award. He also won the Goal of the Month award for a second consecutive month after a forty-yard lob against AFC Wimbledon. Manager Stephen Robinson compared him to Harry Kane and admitted that "when we are without him we really struggle". He finished the 2021–22 season with 26 goals in 50 starts, helping Morecambe to finish two places and two points above the relegation zone, and was named on the PFA Team of the Year.

He was offered a new contract in August 2022 that manager Derek Adams said would make him the club's highest paid player. However, he did not sign a new deal and left the club following the 2022–23 season after his contract expired.

=== Burton Albion ===
On 19 June 2023, it was announced that Stockton would join EFL League One club Burton Albion on a two-year contract.

On 17 January 2024, Stockton joined League Two club Barrow on loan until the end of the season.

=== Salford City ===
Stockton signed for EFL League Two side Salford City on 7 June 2024 on a two-year deal.

On 1 June 2026, it was announced by the club that Stockton would leave the club on expiry of his contract.

=== Accrington Stanley ===
Stockton signed for EFL League Two side Accrington Stanley on 9 July 2026 on a two-year deal.

== Style of play ==
A target man forward, Stockton scores the majority of his goals with his right-foot. Manager Micky Mellon stated that "he's a good size and he uses his physique very well. He knows how to use his frame and his strength... he's got an unbelievable strike on him [and] he's a good finisher... but he's not going to run channels for you and things like that".

== Career statistics ==
As of match played 27 April 2024

Appearances and goals by club, season and competition
Club	Season	League			National Cup (Note: Includes FA Cup)		League Cup (Note: Includes League Cup/EFL Cup and Scottish League Cup)		Other		Total	
Club	Season	Division	Apps	Goals	Apps	Goals	Apps	Goals	Apps	Goals	Apps	Goals
Tranmere Rovers	2011–12	League One	1	0	0	0	0	0	0	0	1	0
Tranmere Rovers	2012–13	League One	31	3	3	2	1	1	1 (Note: Appearance in Football League Trophy)	0	36	6
Tranmere Rovers	2013–14	League One	21	2	2	0	2	1	1	0	26	3
Tranmere Rovers	2014–15	League Two	22	4	3	2	1	0	1	0	27	6
Tranmere Rovers	2015–16	National League	6	0	—		—		0	0	6	0
Tranmere Rovers	2016–17	National League	16	5	—		—		7 (Note: Four appearances and five goals in FA Trophy, three appearances and three goals in National League play-offs)	8	23	13
Tranmere Rovers	Total		97	14	8	4	4	2	10	8	119	28
Vauxhall Motors (loan)	2011–12	Conference North	8	1	—		—		3 (Note: Appearance(s) in FA Trophy)	2	11	3
Southport (loan)	2015–16	National League	10	3	1	0	—		1 (Note: Appearance in Lancashire Senior Cup)	1	12	4
Morecambe (loan)	2015–16	League Two	7	2	—		—		—		7	2
Morecambe (loan)	2016–17	League Two	19	5	2	0	2	2	3 (Note: Appearance(s) in EFL Trophy)	3	26	10
Morecambe (loan)	Total		26	7	2	0	2	2	3	3	33	12
Heart of Midlothian	2017–18	Scottish Premiership	12	0	0	0	3	0	—		15	0
Carlisle United	2017–18	League Two	12	1	—		—		—		12	1
Tranmere Rovers	2018–19	League Two	16	1	2	0	1	0	1	1	20	2
Wrexham (loan)	2018–19	National League	8	1	—		—		1	0	9	1
Morecambe	2019–20	League Two	30	5	1	1	1	0	3	0	35	6
Morecambe	2020–21	League Two	40	13	3	2	2	0	4 (Note: One appearance in EFL Trophy, three appearances in League Two play-offs)	0	49	15
Morecambe	2021–22	League One	44	23	3	1	2	2	1	0	50	26
Morecambe	2022–23	League One	39	11	1	0	2	0	2	1	44	12
Morecambe	Total		153	52	8	4	7	2	10	1	178	59
Burton Albion	2023–24	League One	10	0	2	0	1	0	3	1	16	1
Barrow (loan)	2023–24	League Two	17	7	—		—		—		17	7
Career total			367	87	23	8	18	6	32	17	440	118

== Honours ==
Morecambe

- EFL League Two play-offs: 2021

Individual

- PFA Team of the Year: 2021–22 League One
- EFL League One Player of the Month: August 2021, September 2021
- EFL League One Goal of the Month: August 2021, September 2021
