= Max Power (footballer) =

English footballer (born 1993)

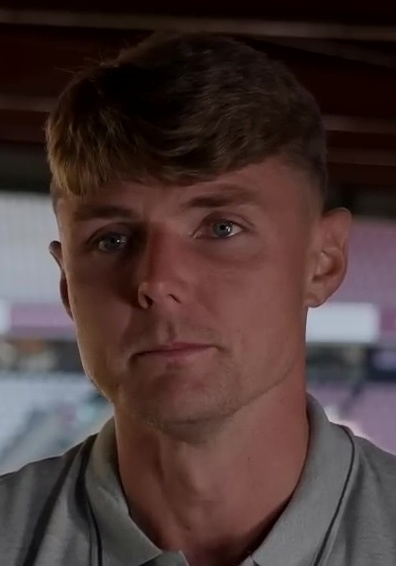
- Power with Bradford City in 2025

Personal information
- Full name: Max McAuley Power
- Date of birth: 27 July 1993 (age 33)
- Place of birth: Birkenhead, England
- Height: 5 ft 11 in (1.81 m)
- Positions: Midfielder; right back

Team information
- Current team: Wigan Athletic
- Number: 8

Youth career
- 2002–2011: Tranmere Rovers

Senior career*
Years	Team	Apps	(Gls)
2011–2015	Tranmere Rovers	109	(12)
2015–2019	Wigan Athletic	127	(11)
2018–2019	→ Sunderland (loan)	16	(2)
2019–2021	Sunderland	92	(9)
2021–2023	Wigan Athletic	89	(4)
2023–2024	Al-Qadsiah	10	(0)
2024–2025	AGF	14	(0)
2025–2026	Bradford City	43	(0)
2026–	Wigan Athletic	10	(1)
- * Club domestic league appearances and goals as of 21:24, 11 November 2026 (UTC)

Max McAuley Power (born 27 July 1993) is an English professional footballer who plays as a midfielder for EFL League One club Wigan Athletic.

== Career ==
=== Tranmere Rovers ===
==== Early career ====
Born in Birkenhead, Wirral, Power joined local Tranmere Rovers' youth set-up at the age of eight and captained the club at every age group including the first team. He chose to join the team instead of signing for Liverpool. After impressing in the Tranmere Rovers Reserve team he was awarded a professional contract in May 2011. Manager Les Parry was confident Power had a bright future in the game, but warned the youngster about his aggression. He compared him to Joss Labadie, another young and talented Rovers midfielder with a reputation as a hothead. Power spent time on loan at Colwyn Bay in the 2010–11 season.

==== 2011–12 season ====
Power made his first team debut in the Football League Trophy clash with Port Vale on 30 August 2011; he replaced Andy Robinson on 66 minutes before he went on to score a penalty in the penalty shootout victory. On 10 September he made his League One debut, starting in a 0–2 defeat away to Huddersfield Town and making way for Labadie after 77 minutes. He ended his first season with four league appearances and two in the Football League Trophy.

==== 2012–13 season ====
Power scored his first goal for the club on 13 November 2012, concluding a 3–0 win against Braintree Town in the FA Cup first round after coming on for James Wallace. He scored his first league goal for the club on 26 December, as they came from behind to win 2–1 against Crewe Alexandra at Prenton Park. On 4 March, he extended his contract, keeping him at the club until June 2015.

==== 2013–14 season ====
In the following season, Power scored his first goal on 15 March 2014, equalising in the 15th minute of an eventual 1–2 home defeat by Swindon Town. His only other goal of the campaign was on 12 April, opening a 2–1 home win over Shrewsbury Town; both teams were relegated at the end of the season.

==== 2014–15 season ====
On 7 October 2014, Power opened the scoring as Tranmere drew 1–1 at home against Carlisle United in the Football League Trophy second round, advancing via a penalty shootout. He scored the only goal in the FA Cup first round against Bristol Rovers on 8 November, converting a penalty after handball by Mark McChrystal. Three days later, he equalised as Tranmere came from behind to win 2–1 at Bury in the quarter-finals of the Football League Trophy.

He opened the scoring in the semi-finals on 9 December, a 2–2 draw against Walsall, and scored in the shootout although his team were knocked out. A week later, Power concluded a 2–1 comeback to defeat Oxford United in an FA Cup second round replay. He again netted in the third round on 3 January 2015, albeit in a 2–6 defeat to Premier League club Swansea City. On his 100th league appearance for Tranmere, he opened the scoring in a 2–1 win away to Cambridge United on 17 March. Tranmere needed to win away at Plymouth Argyle on 25 April to retain their place in The Football League, but Power fouled Dominic Blizzard to concede a penalty which Reuben Reid scored. He equalised from the edge of the penalty area, but his team lost 2–3, and thus were relegated to the Conference, ending a 94-year tenure in the league.

=== Wigan Athletic ===
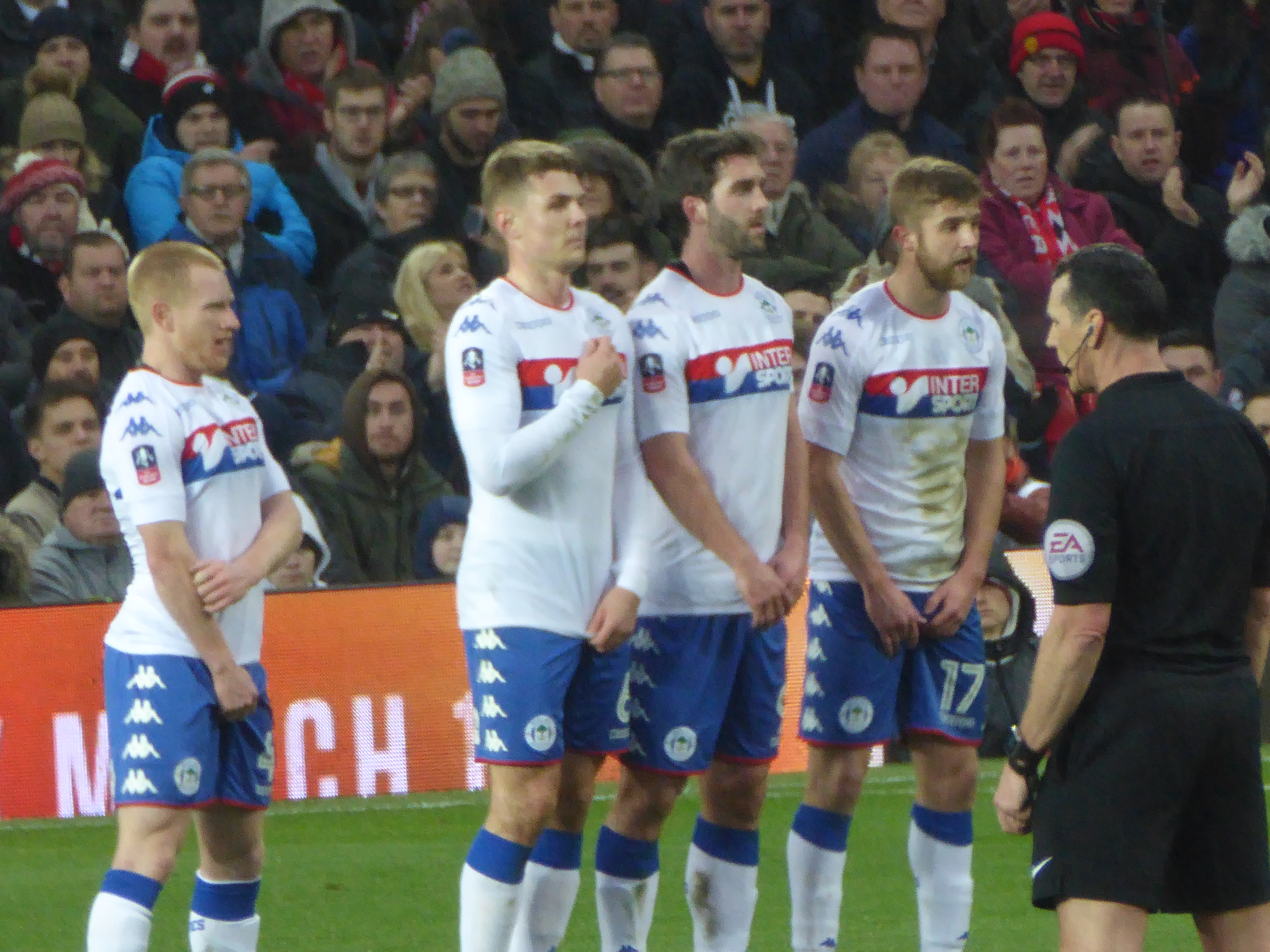
Power (wearing No.6) in the Wigan Athletic wall, facing a Manchester United free-kick, 2017

On 3 July 2015, Power signed for Wigan Athletic on a three-year contract. He scored a free-kick in the club's first pre-season match, a 2–1 win against Queen of the South in La Manga Club. On 9 August he played the full 90 minutes as Wigan began the League One season with a 2–0 defeat to Coventry City at the Ricoh Arena. On 26 September, he scored his first goal for Wigan in a 1–1 draw at Oldham Athletic, opening the scoring from 30 yards.

=== Sunderland ===
On 9 August 2018, Power signed for Sunderland on loan from Wigan Athletic. During his loan spell, Power received three straight red cards against Oxford United, Bradford City and Walsall, although the latter was rescinded 2 days later. On 2 January 2019, Power's loan to Sunderland became permanent, signing a 2 1/2-year contract. Power also went on to make appearances in both the 2019 EFL Trophy Final and the League One play-off final, suffering defeat in both. Power was named Sunderland's team captain at the beginning of the 2020–21 season. He subsequently lifted the trophy following Sunderland's 1–0 win over Tranmere in the 2021 EFL Trophy Final. On 25 May 2021 it was announced that he would leave Sunderland at the end of the season, following the expiry of his contract.

=== Return to Wigan Athletic ===
On 16 June 2021, Power agreed to reunite with manager Leam Richardson ahead of the 2021–22 campaign on a two-year deal. In April 2022 Power picked up his third League One title with Wigan Athletic following a 3–0 victory over Shrewsbury Town.

=== Al-Qadsiah ===
On 12 July 2023, Power joined Saudi First Division League club Al-Qadsiah.

=== AGF ===
On 2 September 2024, following a successful trial period, Power joined Danish Superliga club AGF on a contract until the end of the season. On 30 April 2025, the club announced that Power had departed by mutual consent, enabling him to explore new opportunities prior to the contract's scheduled expiration in May.

=== Bradford City ===
In May 2025, Power signed for Bradford City. In July 2025 he was announced as club captain.

=== Wigan Athletic ===
On 6 June 2026, Power returned for a third spell with League One club Wigan Athletic, signing a two-year deal for an undisclosed fee.

== Personal life ==
Power attended Wirral Grammar School for Boys, and is named after his parents' pet Labrador Retriever. He once feared that he was named after Homer Simpson's brief name change in The Simpsons episode "Homer to the Max", before discovering that the episode aired when he was six years old. He has also posed for a motoring magazine which shares his name.

== Career statistics ==
As of 22 September 2026

Appearances and goals by club, season and competition
Club	Season	League			National cup (Note: Includes FA Cup, King's Cup, Danish Cup)		League cup (Note: Includes EFL Cup)		Other		Total	
Club	Season	Division	Apps	Goals	Apps	Goals	Apps	Goals	Apps	Goals	Apps	Goals
Tranmere Rovers	2011–12	League One	4	0	0	0	0	0	2 (Note: Appearance(s) in Football League Trophy)	0	6	0
Tranmere Rovers	2012–13	League One	27	3	3	1	1	0	1	0	32	4
Tranmere Rovers	2013–14	League One	33	2	0	0	2	0	1	0	36	2
Tranmere Rovers	2014–15	League Two	45	7	4	3	1	0	3	3	53	13
Tranmere Rovers	Total		109	12	7	4	4	0	7	3	127	19
Wigan Athletic	2015–16	League One	44	6	1	0	1	0	2	0	48	6
Wigan Athletic	2016–17	Championship	42	0	2	0	1	0	—		45	0
Wigan Athletic	2017–18	League One	40	5	7	0	1	0	1 (Note: Appearance(s) in EFL Trophy)	0	49	5
Wigan Athletic	2018–19	Championship	1	0	0	0	0	0	—		1	0
Wigan Athletic	Total		127	11	10	0	3	0	3	0	143	11
Sunderland	2018–19	League One	35	4	3	0	1	0	7 (Note: Four appearances in EFL Trophy, three in League One play-offs)	0	46	4
Sunderland	2019–20	League One	31	2	2	0	4	1	1	0	38	3
Sunderland	2020–21	League One	42	5	1	0	1	0	9 (Note: Seven appearances and one goal in EFL Trophy, two in League One play-offs)	1	53	6
Sunderland	Total		108	11	6	0	6	1	17	1	137	13
Wigan Athletic	2021–22	League One	44	3	5	1	2	0	3	1	54	5
Wigan Athletic	2022–23	Championship	39	1	2	0	0	0	0	0	41	1
Wigan Athletic	Total		83	4	7	1	2	0	3	1	95	6
Al-Qadsiah	2023–24	Saudi First Division League	10	0	1	0	—		—		11	0
AGF	2024–25	Danish Superliga	14	0	4	0	—		—		18	0
Bradford City	2025–26	League One	43	0	1	0	2	0	5 (Note: Three appearances in EFL Trophy, two appearances in EFL League Two play-offs)	0	51	0
Wigan Athletic	2026–27	League One	7	1	0	0	1	0	1	0	9	1
Career total			501	39	36	5	18	1	36	5	583	50

== Honours ==
Wigan Athletic

- Football/EFL League One: 2015–16, 2017–18, 2021–22

Sunderland

- EFL Trophy: 2020–21; runner-up: 2018–19

Al-Qadsiah

- Saudi First Division League: 2023–24
