= Michael Kay (footballer) =

English footballer (born 1989)

Personal information
- Full name: Michael Joseph Kay
- Date of birth: 12 September 1989 (age 37)
- Place of birth: Consett, England
- Height: 1.85 m (6 ft 1 in)
- Position: Defender

Youth career
- 1997–2007: Sunderland

Senior career*
Years	Team	Apps	(Gls)
2007–2011	Sunderland	0	(0)
2010	→ Gateshead (loan)	8	(1)
2011	→ Tranmere Rovers (loan)	22	(1)
2011–2013	Tranmere Rovers	12	(0)
2013–2015	Chester	75	(2)
Total		117	(4)

International career
2005	England U17	2	(0)
- * Club domestic league appearances and goals

Michael Joseph Kay (born 9 December 1989 in Consett, England) is an English former footballer. He usually played in the right back position, but could also play as a central defender and has been known to fill in as a left back on occasion. He is a former England Under-17 international. He is no relation to former Sunderland defender John Kay. He is now an engineer at openreach working as a cabler on fnd fibre build. Kay is now a key member of the famous MOFO FC 6-a-side team on the Wirral. The side recently secured their first Premier Division title, following previous successes in the lower divisions during their 25-year existence.

== Club career ==
Kay joined Sunderland's academy at 7 years of age and progressed through the ranks before making his professional debut on 4 February 2009 against Blackburn Rovers in a FA Cup 4th Round Replay. He regularly captained Sunderland's reserve team during the 2009–10 season.

On 30 September 2010 he joined Gateshead on a one-month loan deal. On 2 October, Kay scored on his Gateshead debut against Mansfield Town at Gateshead International Stadium. On 26 October, it was announced that Gateshead had extended Kay's loan for a further 28 days.

On 6 January 2011 he went on another loan, this time for a month at Tranmere Rovers and made his club debut on 8 January against Walsall. On 7 April Sunderland announced that he was amongst eight players to be released at the end of the season. He scored his first goal for Tranmere Rovers on 25 April 2011 in a 4–0 win over Exeter City.

At the end of the 2010–11 season he was offered a contract by Tranmere and it has been reported by local media that he has accepted this deal. In the summer of 2013, he joined Chester.

== Career statistics ==
=== Club ===
As of match played 13 April 2024

Appearances and goals by club, season and competition
Club	Season	League			FA Cup		League Cup		Other		Total	
Club	Season	Division	Apps	Goals	Apps	Goals	Apps	Goals	Apps	Goals	Apps	Goals
Sunderland	2007–08	Premier League	0	0	0	0	0	0	0	0	0	0
Sunderland	2008–09	Premier League	0	0	1	0	0	0	0	0	1	0
Sunderland	2009–10	Premier League	0	0	0	0	0	0	0	0	0	0
Sunderland	2010–11	Premier League	0	0	–		0	0	0	0	0	0
Sunderland	Total		0	0	1	0	0	0	0	0	1	0
Gateshead (loan)	2010–11	Conference Premier	8	1	1	0	–		0	0	9	1
Tranmere Rovers (loan)	2010–11	League One	22	1	–		0	0	0	0	22	1
Tranmere Rovers	2011–12	League One	6	0	0	0	1	0	2 (Note: Appearance(s) in Football League Trophy)	0	9	0
Tranmere Rovers	2012–13	League One	6	0	0	0	2	0	1	0	9	0
Tranmere Rovers	Total		34	1	0	0	3	0	3	0	40	1
Chester	2013–14	Conference Premier	30	0	1	0	–		2 (Note: Appearance(s) in Cheshire Senior Cup)	0	33	0
Chester	2014–15	Conference Premier	33	0	3	0	–		2 (Note: Appearance(s) in FA Trophy)	0	38	0
Chester	2015–16	National League	12	2	1	0	–		1	0	14	2
Chester	Total		75	2	5	0	–		5	0	85	2
Career Total			117	4	7	0	3	0	8	0	135	4
