= 2013–14 Tranmere Rovers F.C. season =

Tranmere Rovers F.C.
2013–14 season
- Chairman: Peter Johnson
- Manager: Ronnie Moore; (until 17 February); John McMahon; (from 17 February)
- League One: 21st (relegated)
- FA Cup: Second round
- Football League Cup: Third round
- Football League Trophy: First round
- Top goalscorer: League: Ryan Lowe (19); All: Ryan Lowe (20)
- Highest home attendance: 9,598 vs Bradford City; (3 May)
- Lowest home attendance: 3,717 vs Swindon Town; (25 March)
- Average home league attendance: 5,113; (16th in the league)
Home colours	Away colours

The 2013–14 season was the 113th season of competitive association football and the 87th season in the Football League played by Tranmere Rovers Football Club, a professional football club based in Birkenhead, Wirral.

== League One ==
=== League table ===
Pos	Team	Pld	W	D	L	GF	GA	GD	Pts	Promotion, qualification or relegation
19	Crewe Alexandra	46	13	12	21	54	80	−26	51	
20	Notts County	46	15	5	26	64	77	−13	50	
21	Tranmere Rovers (R)	46	12	11	23	52	79	−27	47	Relegation to Football League Two
22	Carlisle United (R)	46	11	12	23	43	76	−33	45	Relegation to Football League Two
23	Shrewsbury Town (R)	46	9	15	22	44	65	−21	42	Relegation to Football League Two

Updated to match(es) played on 3 May 2014. Source: BBC Sport
Rules for classification: 1) Points; 2) Goal difference; 3) Number of goals scored
(R) Relegated

Overall								Home						Away					
Pld	W	D	L	GF	GA	GD	Pts	W	D	L	GF	GA	GD	W	D	L	GF	GA	GD
46	12	11	23	52	79	−27	47	6	8	9	30	39	−9	6	3	14	22	40	−18

Last updated: 3 May 2014.
Source: Football League Official Site

=== Results by matchday ===
Round	1	2	3	4	5	6	7	8	9	10	11	12	13	14	15	16	17	18	19	20	21	22	23	24	25	26	27	28	29	30	31	32	33	34	35	36	37	38	39	40	41	42	43	44	45	46
Ground	A	H	A	H	A	H	H	A	H	A	A	H	A	H	A	H	A	A	H	A	H	A	A	H	H	A	H	H	A	H	A	H	H	A	A	H	A	H	H	A	H	A	A	H	A	H
Result	L	D	L	L	W	D	L	L	L	L	W	L	D	W	D	D	W	L	W	L	L	W	L	D	D	L	W	L	W	L	D	W	D	L	L	W	L	L	D	W	W	L	L	D	L	L
Position	22	18	19	22	18	18	17	19	21	24	21	22	22	21	20	21	19	20	19	20	20	19	20	20	20	21	17	18	17	17	18	18	18	20	21	19	20	20	20	19	19	19	19	19	21	21

Updated to match(es) played on 3 May 2014. Source: Statto.com
A = Away; H = Home; W = Win; D = Draw; L = Loss

=== Matches ===
3 August 2013 1	Walsall	3–1	Tranmere Rovers	Walsall
15:00	Westcarr 4', 71'; Lalkovic 25'	TRFC Report; BBC Report	Akpa Akpro (yellow card) 36'; Robinson 40'; Power (yellow card) 45'; Holmes (yellow card) 57'; Koumas (yellow card) 87'; Horwood (yellow card) 90'	Stadium: Bescot Stadium; Attendance: 4,788; Referee: Brendam Malone

10 August 2013 2	Tranmere Rovers	3–3	Crawley Town	Birkenhead
15:00	Horwood (yellow card) 9'; Thompson 16', 44'; Power (yellow card) 28'; Robinson (yellow card) 54'; Lowe 90'	TRFC Report; BBC Report	Walsh 10', 81'; Clarke 55'	Stadium: Prenton Park; Attendance: 4,763; Referee: Keith Hill

17 August 2013 3	Crewe Alexandra	2–1	Tranmere Rovers	Crewe
15:00	Colclough 42', 85'; Osman (yellow card) 76'	TRFC Report; BBC Report	Holmes (yellow card) 12' (yellow-red card) 33'; Thompson (yellow card) 16'; Akpa Akpro 87'	Stadium: Alexandra Stadium; Attendance: 4,720; Referee: Andrew Madley

24 August 2013 4	Tranmere Rovers	0–5	Peterborough United	Birkenhead
15:00	Atkinson (yellow card) 7'; Jones (red card) 38'; Power (yellow card) 49'; Lowe (yellow card) 58'	TRFC Report; BBC Report	Rowe 14'; Barnett 34'; McCann 38' (pen.); Assombalonga 59'; Little 68'	Stadium: Prenton Park; Attendance: 4,592; Referee: Jeremy Simpson

31 August 2013 5	Oldham Athletic	0–1	Tranmere Rovers	Oldham
15:00	Lanzoni (yellow card) 81'	TRFC Report; BBC Report	Rowe (yellow card) 65'; Lowe 90'	Stadium: Boundary Park; Attendance: 4,792; Referee: Eddie Ilderton

7 September 2013 6	Tranmere Rovers	0–0	Stevenage	Birkenhead
15:00	Thompson (yellow card) 15'; Power (yellow card) 81'	TRFC Report; BBC Report	Deacon (yellow card) 45'; Doughty (yellow card) 81'; Heslop (yellow card) 89'; Touncara (yellow card) 90+1'	Stadium: Prenton Park; Attendance: 4,156; Referee: Craig Pawson

14 September 2013 7	Tranmere Rovers	3–4	Brentford	Birkenhead
15:00	Atkinson 44'; Dugdale 55'; Akpa Akpro (yellow card) 80'; Robinson (yellow card) 83'; Stockton 90'	TRFC Report; BBC Report	Taylor 3'; Donaldson 14', 71'; Forshaw 90' (pen.)	Stadium: Prenton Park; Attendance: 4,454; Referee: Scott Duncan

21 September 2013 8	Notts County	2–0	Tranmere Rovers	Nottingham
15:00	Labadie 7' (yellow card) 63'; Leacock (yellow card) 67'; Harber 79'	TRFC Report; BBC Report	Rowe (yellow card) 5'; Hateley (yellow card) 82'	Stadium: Meadow Lane; Attendance: 3,938; Referee: Seb Stockbridge

28 September 2013 9	Tranmere Rovers	0–1	Port Vale	Birkenhead
15:00	Lowe (yellow card) 25'; Rowe (yellow card) 38'	TRFC Report; BBC Report	Griffith (yellow card) 43'; Williamson (yellow card) 45'; Lines 56'; Neal (yellow card) 64'; Myrie-Williams (yellow card) 82'	Stadium: Prenton Park; Attendance: 5,334; Referee: Paul Tierney

5 October 2013 10	Swindon Town	1–0	Tranmere Rovers	Swindon
15:00	N'Guessan 29' (pen.); Thompson (yellow card) 90'	TRFC Report; BBC Report	Lowe (yellow card) 85'	Stadium: County Ground; Attendance: 7,889; Referee: Charles Breakspear

13 October 2013 11	Bradford City	0–1	Tranmere Rovers	Bradford
15:00	Hanson (yellow card) 29'; Thompson (yellow card) 59'; Folan (yellow card) 85'	TRFC Report; BBC Report	McNulty (yellow card) 16'; Goodison (yellow card) 27'; Lowe 69'; Williams (yellow card) 83'	Stadium: Valley Parade; Attendance: 14,674; Referee: Darren Drysdale

19 October 2013 12	Tranmere Rovers	0–4	Leyton Orient	Birkenhead
15:00	Ridehalgh (yellow card) 45+2'; Goodison (red card) 64'; Lowe (yellow card) 78'	TRFC Report; BBC Report	Lisbie 22', 61'; Baudry (yellow card) 56'; Cox 78'; Batt 85'	Stadium: Prenton Park; Attendance: 4,313; Referee: Richard Clark

22 October 2013 13	Rotherham United	1–1	Tranmere Rovers	Rotherham
19:45	Agard 60'; Milsom (yellow card) 79'; Skarz (yellow card) 84'	TRFC Report; BBC Report	Stockton (yellow card) 69'; Lowe 84' (pen.)	Stadium: New York Stadium; Attendance: 7,511; Referee: Tony Harrington

26 October 2013 14	Tranmere Rovers	3–2	Milton Keynes Dons	Birkenhead
15:00	Lowe 7' 66' (pen.); Rowe 84'; Horwood (yellow card) 90+2'	TRFC Report; BBC Report	Powell 39'; Banton 49'; Spence (yellow card) 66'	Stadium: Prenton Park; Attendance: 4,100; Referee: Steve Rushton

2 November 2013 15	Preston North End	1–1	Tranmere Rovers	Preston
15:00	Wright (yellow card) 83'; Keane (yellow card) 84'; Garner 90+1' (yellow card) 90+1'	TRFC Report; BBC Report	Atkinson 55'; Williams (yellow card) 87'; Power (yellow card) 90+2'	Stadium: Deepdale; Attendance: 9,496; Referee: Geoff Eltringham

16 November 2013 16	Tranmere Rovers	1–1	Bristol City	Birkenhead
15:00	Ridehalgh 41'; McNulty (yellow card) 45'	TRFC Report; BBC Report	Baldock 14'; Gillett (yellow card) 61'; Pack (yellow card) 89'	Stadium: Prenton Park; Attendance: 4,932; Referee: Kevin Wright

23 November 2013 17	Coventry City	1–5	Tranmere Rovers	Northampton
15:00	Webster (yellow card) 63'; Baker 76' (pen.)	TRFC Report; BBC Report	Lowe 4', 44', 54'; Kirby 37'; Holmes (yellow card) 76'; Taylor (red card) 78'; Wallace 89'	Stadium: Sixfields Stadium; Attendance: 1,815; Referee: Darren Deadman

26 November 2013 18	Wolverhampton Wanderers	2–0	Tranmere Rovers	Wolverhampton
19:45	Griffiths 17'; Edwards 42'	TRFC Report; BBC Report	Sodje (yellow card) 82'; Wallace (yellow card) 82'	Stadium: Molineux Stadium; Attendance: 14,989; Referee: Graham Scott

30 November 2013 19	Tranmere Rovers	2–1	Colchester United	Birkenhead
15:00	Lowe 32', 56' (pen.)	TRFC Report; BBC Report	Dickson (yellow card) 44'; Morrison 90'	Stadium: Prenton Park; Attendance: 4,148; Referee: Dean Whitestone

14 December 2013 20	Carlisle United	4–1	Tranmere Rovers	Carlisle
15:00	Lawrence 1', 67'; Ehmer (yellow card) 38'; Amoo 52'; Robson (yellow card) 73'; Berrett 76'	TRFC Report; BBC Report	Taylor (yellow card) 59'; Akpa Akpro (yellow card) 79'; Lowe 81'	Stadium: Brunton Park; Attendance: 3,793; Referee: Andrew Madley

20 December 2013 21	Tranmere Rovers	1–2	Gillingham	Birkenhead
19:45	McNulty (red card) 56'; Lowe 77'; Robinson (yellow card) 81'	TRFC Report; BBC Report	Dack (yellow card) 34'; Akinfenwa 45', 69'; Nelson (yellow card) 77'	Stadium: Prenton Park; Attendance: 6,251; Referee: Robert Lewis

26 December 2013 22	Shrewsbury Town	0–1	Tranmere Rovers	Shrewsbury
15:00	Reach (yellow card) 45'	TRFC Report; BBC Report	Robinson 45'; Peterson (yellow card) 74'; Ridehalgh (yellow card) 90'	Stadium: New Meadow; Attendance: 6,056; Referee: Andy Woolmer

29 December 2013 23	Sheffield United	3–1	Tranmere Rovers	Sheffield
15:00	Murphy 9'; McMahon (yellow card) 27'; Baxter 56'; Maguire (yellow card) 60'; Flynn 67'	TRFC Report; BBC Report	Robinson (yellow card) 51'; Akpa Akpro (yellow card) 54'; Jennings (yellow card) 79'; Taylor 85'	Stadium: Bramall Lane; Attendance: 17,460; Referee: David Webb

1 January 2014 24	Tranmere Rovers	1–1	Wolverhampton Wanderers	Birkenhead
15:00	Lowe 34'; Wallace (red card) 45'; Petersen (yellow card) 49'; Taylor (yellow card) 81'	TRFC Report; BBC Report	Stearman (red card) 20'; Edwards 55'; McDonald (yellow card) 56'	Stadium: Prenton Park; Attendance: 6,158; Referee: Darren Deadman

11 January 2014 25	Tranmere Rovers	1–1	Walsall	Birkenhead
15:00	Stockton 78'	TRFC Report; BBC Report	Lalkovič 19' (yellow card) 67'; Taylor (yellow card) 39'; Chambers (yellow card) 60'	Stadium: Prenton Park; Attendance: 4,871; Referee: Andy Haines

18 January 2014 26	Peterborough United	3–0	Tranmere Rovers	Peterborough
15:00	Assombalonga 5' (pen.), 87'; Brisley (yellow card) 72'; Ajose 75'	TRFC Report; BBC Report	Jennings (yellow card) 23'; Pennington (yellow card) 69'; Arthurworrey (yellow card) 77'	Stadium: London Road Stadium; Attendance: 5,297; Referee: Gavin Ward

25 January 2014 27	Tranmere Rovers	1–0	Crewe Alexandra	Birkenhead
15:00	Pennington 28'; Kennedy (yellow card) 36'; Koumas (yellow card) 83'	TRFC Report; BBC Report	Evans (yellow card) 37'; Mellor (yellow card) 39'	Stadium: Prenton Park; Attendance: 5,045; Referee: Scott Mathieson

28 January 2014 28	Tranmere Rovers	1–2	Rotherham United	Birkenhead
19:45	Robinson 90'	TRFC Report; BBC Report	Revell 39', 65'	Stadium: Prenton Park; Attendance: 3,777; Referee: Steve Bratt

1 February 2014 29	Milton Keynes Dons	0–1	Tranmere Rovers	Milton Keynes
15:00		TRFC Report; BBC Report	Taylor (yellow card) 62'; Lowe 90' (yellow card) 90'	Stadium: Stadium:mk

8 February 2014 30	Tranmere Rovers	1–2	Preston North End	Birkenhead
15:00	Cassidy (yellow card) 33'; Taylor 45'; Pennington (yellow card) 90'	TRFC Report; BBC Report	Garner 18', 52'; Laird (yellow card) 60'	Stadium: Prenton Park; Attendance: 5,895; Referee: David Coote

15 February 2014 31	Bristol City	2–2	Tranmere Rovers	Bristol
15:00	Baldock 13'; Williams 78'	TRFC Report; BBC Report	Cassidy 19'; Jennings (yellow card) 22'; Lowe (yellow card) 29'; Arthurworrey (yellow card) 64'; Koumas 80'; Pennington (yellow card) 85'	Stadium: Ashton Gate Stadium; Attendance: 11,340; Referee: Michael Bull

22 February 2014 32	Tranmere Rovers	3–1	Coventry City	Birkenhead
15:00	Lowe 12' (pen.); Wallace (yellow card) 35' (goal) 48'; Kirby 64' (yellow card) 83'; Taylor (yellow card) 75'	TRFC Report; BBC Report	Petrasso 79'; Fleck (yellow card) 90'	Stadium: Prenton Park; Attendance: 5,279; Referee: Andy Madley

1 March 2014 33	Tranmere Rovers	2–2	Oldham Athletic	Birkenhead
15:00	Robinson (yellow card) 3'; Grounds 31' (o.g.); Taylor (yellow card) 39'; Lowe 76'	TRFC Report; BBC Report	Wesolowski 12' (yellow card) 49'; Ridehalgh 59' (o.g.)	Stadium: Prenton Park; Attendance: 5,061; Referee: Charles Breakspear

8 March 2014 34	Stevenage	3–1	Tranmere Rovers	Stevenage
15:00	Dembélé (yellow card) 10'; Obeng (yellow card) 14'; Smith 21'; Charles 71'; Mousinho 74'	TRFC Report; BBC Report	Fôn Williams (yellow card) 74'; Cassidy (yellow card) 87'; Obeng 88' (o.g.)	Stadium: Broadhall Way; Attendance: 2,577; Referee: Simon Hooper

11 March 2014 35	Brentford	2–0	Tranmere Rovers	Brentford
19:45	McCormack (yellow card) 39'; Tarkowski 62' (yellow card) 79'; Donaldson 74'	TRFC Report; BBC Report	Wallace (yellow card) 25'; Cassidy (yellow card) 62'	Stadium: Griffin Park; Attendance: 5,646; Referee: Trevor Kettle

15 March 2014 36	Tranmere Rovers	3–2	Notts County	Birkenhead
15:00	Koumas 25'; Lowe 28'; Jennings 84'; Fôn Williams (yellow card) 90'	TRFC Report; BBC Report	Murray 14'; Tyson (yellow card) 59'; Sheehan 61'; Mullins (yellow card) 82'; Grealish (yellow card) 90'	Stadium: Prenton Park; Attendance: 4,292; Referee: Keith Stroud

22 March 2014 37	Port Vale	3–2	Tranmere Rovers	Burslem
15:00	Pope 3'; Knott 47'; Williamson 56'; Griffith (yellow card) 79'	TRFC Report; BBC Report	Taylor 58'; Koumas 60' (yellow card) 63'; Arthurworrey (yellow card) 74'; Goodison (yellow card) 90'	Stadium: Vale Park; Attendance: 5,449; Referee: Richard Clark

25 March 2014 38	Tranmere Rovers	1–2	Swindon Town	Birkenhead
19:45	Power 15'; Robinson (yellow card) 89'	TRFC Report; BBC Report	Smith 12'; Storey 68'; Reckord (yellow card) 90'	Stadium: Prenton Park; Attendance: 3,717; Referee: Graham Salisbury

29 March 2014 39	Tranmere Rovers	0–0	Carlisle United	Birkenhead
15:00	Cassidy (yellow card) 44'; Goodison (yellow card) 90'	TRFC Report; BBC Report		Stadium: Prenton Park; Attendance: 5,215; Referee: Stuart Attwell

5 April 2014 40	Colchester United	1–2	Tranmere Rovers	Colchester
15:00	Olufemi (yellow card) 19'; Sears 45'	TRFC Report; BBC Report	Akpa Akpro 36'; Arthurworrey (yellow card) 49'; Lowe 63'; Power (yellow card) 87'; Holmes (yellow card) 90'	Stadium: Colchester Community Stadium; Attendance: 3,443; Referee: Andy Davies

12 April 2014 41	Tranmere Rovers	2–1	Shrewsbury Town	Birkenhead
15:00	Power 19'; Koumas (yellow card) 34'; Brown 85'; Lowe (yellow card) 90'	TRFC Report; BBC Report	Parry 73'; Grandison (yellow card) 90'	Stadium: Prenton Park; Attendance: 5,698; Referee: David Phillips

15 April 2014 42	Crawley Town	2–0	Tranmere Rovers	Crawley
19:45	Tubbs 37'; Jones (yellow card) 64'; Edwards 86'; Sadler (yellow card) 90'	TRFC Report; BBC Report	Rowe (yellow card) 90'	Stadium: Broadfield Stadium; Attendance: 3,443; Referee: James Linington

18 April 2014 43	Gillingham	2–0	Tranmere Rovers	Gillingham
15:00	Martin (yellow card) 35'; Hessenthaler (yellow card) 52'; Dack 78' (yellow card) 79'; McDonald 90'	TRFC Report; BBC Report		Stadium: Priestfield Stadium; Attendance: 7,343; Referee: Michael Naylor

21 April 2014 44	Tranmere Rovers	0–0	Sheffield United	Birkenhead
19:45		TRFC Report; BBC Report	Maguire (yellow card) 54'	Stadium: Prenton Park; Attendance: 5,950; Referee: Stephen Martin

26 April 2014 45	Leyton Orient	2–0	Tranmere Rovers	Leyton
15:00	Lisbie 44'; Cuthbert (yellow card) 69'; Dagnall 77'	TRFC Report; BBC Report	Jennings (yellow card) 29'; Rowe (yellow card) 68'; Williams (yellow card) 69'	Stadium: Brisbane Road; Attendance: 4,923; Referee: Darren Sheldrake

3 May 2014 46	Tranmere Rovers	1–2	Bradford City	Birkenhead
15:00	Pennington 7'; Brown (red card) 31'	TRFC Report; BBC Report	Jones (yellow card) 15'; Stead 81'; Mclean 87'	Stadium: Prenton Park; Attendance: 9,598; Referee: Graham Scott

== FA Cup ==
9 November 2013 First round	Accrington Stanley (4)	0–1	Tranmere Rovers	Accrington
15:00		TRFC Report; BBC Report	90' Lowe	Stadium: Crown Ground; Attendance: 1,711; Referee: Seb Stockinbridge

7 December 2013 Second round	Peterborough United (3)	5–0	Tranmere Rovers	Peterborough
15:00	Assombalonga 38', 64', 73'; Jeffers 45', 90'	TRFC Report; BBC Report		Stadium: London Road Stadium; Attendance: 3,269; Referee: Michael Naylor

== Football League Cup ==
6 August 2013 First round	Tranmere Rovers	2–0	Mansfield Town (4)	Birkenhead
19:45	Robinson 2'; Atkinson 45'	TRFC Report; BBC Report		Stadium: Prenton Park; Attendance: 3,067; Referee: David Webb

27 August 2013 Second round	Tranmere Rovers	1–1 (a.e.t.) (4–2 p)	Bolton Wanderers (2)	Birkenhead
19:45	Stockton 45'	TRFC Report; BBC Report	Beckford 66'	Stadium: Prenton Park; Attendance: 3,379; Referee: Stephen Martin
	Penalties
	Power (penalty scored); Akpa Akpro (penalty scored); Horwood (penalty scored); Rowe (penalty scored)		(penalty missed) Moritz; (penalty scored) Beckford; (penalty scored) Mills; (penalty missed) Baptiste

25 September 2013 Third round	Tranmere Rovers	0–2	Stoke City (1)	Birkenhead
19:45		TRFC Report; BBC Report	Ireland 23'; Crouch 90'	Stadium: Prenton Park; Attendance: 5,559; Referee: David Coote

== Football League Trophy ==
3 September 2013 First round	Tranmere Rovers	1–2	Fleetwood Town (4)	Birkenhead
19:45	Horwood 37'	TRFC Report; BBC Report	Matt 48', 66'	Stadium: Prenton Park; Attendance: 1,937; Referee: Carl Boyeson

== Players ==
Transfers, contract extensions and loans are listed from the last day of the previous season till the final day of this season

=== Transfers ===
In
Date	Player	Age	Previous club	Ends	Fee
19 June 2013	(England) Stephen Foster	32	Barnsley	1 July 2015	Free
19 June 2013	(England) Evan Horwood	27	Hartlepool United	1 July 2015	Free
21 June 2013	(England) Ryan Lowe	34	Milton Keynes Dons	1 July 2015	Free
15 July 2013	(England) Akpo Sodje	33	Scunthorpe United	1 July 2014	Free
19 July 2013	(England) James Rowe	21	Forest Green Rovers	1 July 2014	Free
1 August 2013	(Wales) Jason Koumas	33	Wigan Athletic	1 July 2014	Free
21 September 2013	(England) Tom Hateley	24	Motherwell	20 January 2014	Free
27 September 2013	(England) Antonie Boland	18	Blackburn Rovers	1 July 2014	Free
27 September 2013	(Republic of Ireland) Callum Morris	21	Wigan Athletic	1 July 2014	Free
22 October 2013	(England) Steve Jennings	28	Coventry City	non-contract	Free
3 January 2014	(England) Liam Ridehalgh	22	Huddersfield Town	1 July 2016	Free

Out
Date	Player	Age	Status	Next club	Fee
22 July 2013	(Ivory Coast) Zoumana Bakayoko	26	Transfer	Leicester City	Free
29 August 2013	(England) Stephen Foster	32	Released	Retired	Free
20 January 2014	(England) Tom Hateley	24	Released	Śląsk Wrocław	Free
17 April 2014	(England) Akpo Sodje	34	Released	Retired	Free
17 April 2014	(England) Andy Robinson	34	Released	Shrewsbury Town	Free

=== Contract extensions ===
Date	Player	Age	Ends
9 May 2013	(Jamaica) Ian Goodison	40	1 July 2014
14 June 2013	(Northern Ireland) Jason Mooney	24	1 July 2014
19 June 2013	(England) Andy Robinson	23	1 July 2014
8 July 2013	(Wales) Owain Fôn Williams	26	1 July 2015
10 January 2014	(England) Steve Jennings	29	1 July 2014
2 May 2014	(England) James Rowe	22	1 July 2015

=== Loans ===
In
Player	Age	Signed from	Date	
Player	Age	Signed from	Started	Ended
(England) Chris Atkinson	21	Huddersfield Town	18 July	31 December
(England) Andrai Jones	21	Barnsley	17 August	17 September
(England) Adam Dugdale	25	Crewe Alexandra	30 August	30 September
(England) Liam Ridehalgh	22	Huddersfield Town	28 September	31 December
(England) Jimmy McNulty	28	Barnsley	3 October	2 January
(England) Bradley Watkins	19	Aston Villa	11 October	11 November
(England) Ryan Edwards	20	Blackburn Rovers	28 November	31 December
(Sweden) Kristoffer Peterson	19	Liverpool	28 November	31 December
(England) Jon Otsemobor	30	Milton Keynes Dons	28 November	31 December
(England) Matthew Pennington	19	Everton	1 January	24 February
(England) Stephen Arthurworrey	19	Fulham	1 January	end of the season
(Scotland) Matthew Kennedy	19	Everton	9 January	24 February
(Wales) Jake Cassidy	20	Wolverhampton Wanderers	20 January	28 April
(England) Junior Brown	24	Fleetwood Town	6 March	end of the season
(United States) Gboly Ariyibi	19	Leeds United	25 March	end of the season
(England) Matthew Pennington	19	Everton	27 March	end of the season

Out
Player	Age	Signed to	Date	
Player	Age	Signed to	Started	Ended
(France) Jean-Louis Akpa Akpro	29	Bury	24 January	29 March
(England) Akpo Sodje	34	Macclesfield Town	20 February	20 March
(England) Evan Horwood	28	Northampton Town	24 March	end of the season

=== Season statistics ===
No.	Nat	Player	Total		League One		FA Cup		League Cup		League Trophy		Discipline		Signed^{†}		
No.	Nat	Player	A	G	A	G	A	G	A	G	A	G	Booked	Sent off (straight red)	Status	Joined	Left
Goalkeepers
1	(Wales)	Owain Fôn Williams	49+0	–	43+0	–	2+0	–	3+0	–	1+0	–	5	–	–	–	–
13	(England)	Sam Ramsbottom	–	–	–	–	–	–	–	–	–	–	–	–	youth	–	–
25	(England)	Bradley Watkins	–	–	–	–	–	–	–	–	–	–	–	–	loan	11.10	11.11
30	(Wales)	Luke Pilling	–	–	–	–	–	–	–	–	–	–	–	–	youth	–	–
33	(Northern Ireland)	Jason Mooney	3+0	–	3+0	–	–	–	–	–	–	–	–	–	–	–	–
Defenders
2	(England)	Danny Holmes	29+4	–	25+3	–	2+0	–	2+1	–	–	–	5	1	–	–	–
3	(England)	Evan Horwood	16+6	1	12+6	–	–	–	3+0	–	1+0	1	3	–	–	–	–
4	(Wales)	Ash Taylor	46+1	3	41+1	3	1+0	–	3+0	–	1+0	–	5	1	–	–	–
5	(Jamaica)	Ian Goodison	17+3	–	15+3	–	–	–	1+0	–	1+0	–	3	1	–	–	–
6	(England)	Tom Hateley	10+0	–	8+0	–	1+0	–	1+0	–	–	–	1	–	–	21.09	20.01
6	(England)	Stephen Foster	5+0	–	4+0	–	–	–	1+0	–	–	–	–	–	–	–	29.08
18	(England)	Andrai Jones	2+1	–	1+1	–	–	–	-	–	1+0	–	–	1	loan	17.08	17.09
20	(England)	Adam Dugdale	5+0	1	4+0	1	–	–	1+0	–	–	–	–	–	loan	30.08	30.09
20	(England)	Jimmy McNulty	14+0	–	12+0	–	2+0	–	–	–	–	–	2	1	loan	03.10	02.01
23	(England)	Liam Ridehalgh	38+0	1	36+0	1	2+0	–	–	–	-	–	2	-	loan / –	28.09	–
27	(Wales)	Ben Maher	–	–	–	–	–	–	–	–	–	–	–	–	youth	–	–
28	(England)	Antonie Boland	–	–	–	–	–	–	–	–	–	–	–	–	–	27.09	–
29	(England)	Matthew Pennington	17+0	2	17+0	2	–	–	–	–	–	–	-	–	loan	01.01; 27.03	24.02 –
29	(England)	Ryan Edwards	1+0	-	-	-	1+0	–	–	–	–	–	3	–	loan	28.11	31.12
31	(England)	Jon Otsemobor	2+0	-	2+0	-	–	–	–	–	–	–	-	–	loan	28.11	31.12
32	(England)	Stephen Arthurworrey	15+2	-	15+2	-	–	–	–	–	–	–	4	–	loan	01.01	–
Midfielders
7	(England)	Joe Thompson	7+1	2	6+0	2	–	–	1+0	–	0+1	–	2	–	–	–	–
8	(England)	James Wallace	17+2	2	16+2	2	1+0	–	–	–	–	–	3	1	–	–	–
11	(Sierra Leone)	Abdulai Bell-Baggie	5+10	–	4+8	–	1+0	–	0+2	–	–	–	–	–	–	–	–
12	(England)	James Rowe	11+13	1	7+12	1	0+1	–	3+0	–	1+0	–	5	–	–	–	–
14	(England)	Chris Atkinson	28+0	3	22+0	2	2+0	–	3+0	1	1+0	–	1	–	loan	–	31.12
15	(England)	Jake Kirby	21+14	2	19+12	2	2+0	–	0+1	–	0+1	–	1	–	–	–	–
17	(England)	Max Power	30+6	2	27+6	2	–	–	2+0	–	1+0	–	6	–	–	–	–
18	(England)	Steve Jennings	23+2	1	23+2	1	–	–	–	–	–	–	4	–	–	22.10	–
20	(Scotland)	Matthew Kennedy	8+0	–	8+0	–	–	–	–	–	–	–	1	–	loan	09.01	24.02
22	(Wales)	Jason Koumas	26+8	4	24+7	4	1+0	–	1+1	–	–	–	4	–	–	–	–
24	(Republic of Ireland)	Callum Morris	–	–	–	–	–	–	–	–	–	–	–	–	–	27.09	–
25	(Sweden)	Kristoffer Peterson	7+0	–	6+0	–	1+0	–	–	–	–	–	2	–	loan	28.11	31.12
25	(United States)	Gboly Ariyibi	0+2	–	0+2	–	–	–	–	–	–	–	–	–	loan	25.03	–
Forwards
9	(England)	Ryan Lowe	49+1	20	44+1	19	2+0	1	2+0	–	1+0	–	7	–	–	–	–
10	(England)	Andy Robinson	10+10	4	9+10	3	–	–	1+0	1	–	–	6	–	–	–	17.04
14	(Wales)	Jake Cassidy	19+0	1	19+0	1	–	–	–	–	–	–	4	–	loan	20.01	28.04
16	(England)	Cole Stockton	5+21	3	2+19	2	0+2	–	2+0	1	1+0	–	1	–	–	–	–
19	(England)	Akpo Sodje	5+6	–	3+6	–	–	–	1+0	–	1+0	–	1	–	–	–	17.04
20	(England)	Junior Brown	8+1	1	8+1	1	–	–	–	–	–	–	–	1	loan	06.03	–
21	(England)	Liam Davies	–	–	–	–	–	–	–	–	–	–	–	–	youth	–	–
26	(France)	Jean-Louis Akpa Akpro	24+7	2	21+4	2	1+1	–	2+1	–	0+1	–	5	–	–	–	–
		Own goals		1		1		–		–		–					
		Total	52	56	46	51	2	1	3	3	1	1	86	7			

^{†} Statuses are mentioned for youth academy players without senior contract and players who were signed on non-contract basis or on loan. Dates joined and left are mentioned only for players who changed club between the first and the last matchday of the season.

Last updated: 3 May 2014.
Source: 11v11.com
