= Ash Taylor =

Footballer (born 1990)

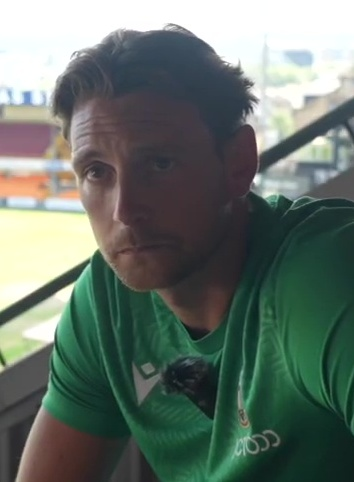

Personal information
- Full name: Ashton John Taylor
- Date of birth: 2 September 1990 (age 36)
- Place of birth: Bromborough, England
- Height: 1.93 m (6 ft 4 in)
- Position: Defender

Youth career
- 2002: Tranmere Rovers

Senior career*
Years	Team	Apps	(Gls)
2009–2014	Tranmere Rovers	183	(8)
2009	→ Colwyn Bay (loan)	14	(3)
2014–2017	Aberdeen	100	(9)
2017–2019	Northampton Town	78	(6)
2019–2021	Aberdeen	45	(2)
2021–2022	Walsall	11	(1)
2022–2023	Kilmarnock	43	(7)
2023–2024	Bradford City	12	(0)
2024–2025	FCB Magpies	17	(1)
2025–2026	Europa	6	(0)
2026	Europa Point	1	(0)

International career^{‡}
2009	Wales U19	3	(0)
2012	Wales U21	1	(0)

Managerial career
- 2025–: Gibraltar U19
- * Club domestic league appearances and goals as of 22:44, 10 January 2026 (UTC) ‡ National team caps and goals as of 19:07, 1 March 2012 (UTC)

Ashton John Taylor (born 2 September 1990) is a former professional footballer who played as a defender. He began his career with Tranmere Rovers, and during his time there had a loan spell at Colwyn Bay. He later played for Scottish club Aberdeen before moving to English club Northampton Town for two years, after which he re-signed for Aberdeen. Born in England, he has represented Wales at youth international level.

== Club career ==
=== Tranmere Rovers ===
Taylor started his footballing career at Tranmere Rovers as a youth team player at the age of 10. In the summer of 2007, he signed as a first-year scholar at Tranmere Rovers. In January 2009, Taylor signed his first professional contract with the club.

He joined Colwyn Bay on loan in 2009, where he made a total of 14 appearances. Whilst on loan, Taylor scored a hat-trick in a 4–1 win over Lancaster City in the Northern Premier League Division One North in March 2009.

Following his return from Colwyn Bay, Taylor made his first team debut in a League One match against Scunthorpe United, a 1–1 away draw on 2 May 2009, replacing Antony Kay as a substitute in the 89th minute.

At the start of the 2009–10 season, Taylor signed a twelve-month contract extension keeping him at the club until 2011. He scored his first goal for Tranmere in a 1–0 win at Leyton Orient in the FA Cup First Round in November 2009. His first league goal came on 26 January 2010, as Tranmere beat Yeovil Town 2–1. In February 2010, Taylor sustained a hamstring injury that kept him out for three weeks. He made his return, in a 0–0 draw against Bristol Rovers on 15 March 2010. After making his return, Taylor continued to make more appearances and went on to make thirty-three appearances. At the end of the season he won Tranmere's "Young Player of The Season" award for the 2009–10 season. On 21 May 2010, he extended his contract by another year, until 2012.

Taylor missed the first the half of the 2010–11 season when he damaged his cartilage in training, requiring an operation that would keep him out of action for "four to six weeks at best and up to three months if the damage to a cartilage requires a full repair." He returned to training and started his rehabilitation process in September 2010. Following his return, Manager Les Parry praised Taylor for his recovery. After being on the bench for three matches since his return, Taylor made his first appearance of the season, in the Football League Trophy Northern Area final, as Tranmere lost 2–0 to Huddersfield Town. After the match, Taylor said he was surprised to have been selected having initially expected to play a reserve match before making his return Following his 50th appearance for the club, Manager Parry said that he believed Taylor had the potential to become the next captain of Tranmere Rovers.

In Tranmere's opening match of the 2011–12 season Taylor scored the equalizer in a 1–1 draw with Port Vale in the first round of the Northern section of the Football League Trophy. With the scores level after extra–time the match went to a penalty shootout where Taylor scored the winning penalty as Tranmere won 4–2. He scored his first league goal of the season, on 17 September 2011, as Tranmere won 2–1 against Wycombe Wanderers. In the second round of the Football League Trophy, Taylor scored Tranmere's first goal in the match against Accrington Stanley, but the game was later abandoned after 39 minutes following a serious injury to Accrington's Tom Bender. In the rematch on 13 October 2011, Taylor scored from a free kick, in a 1–0 win to send Tranmere through to the next round. Taylor's season ended early when he missed the final two league matches due to a calcium problem. Taylor made thirty-seven league appearances during the season, scoring twice. He also played 3607 minutes in all competitions.

On 8 May 2012, Taylor signed a new two-year contract with Tranmere. He scored his first goal of the 2012–13 season in a 2–2 draw against Portsmouth on 7 December 2012. Then, his second goal of the season came on 23 February 2013, in a 5–1 victory over Colchester United. Taylor made forty-four league appearances, missing two others while on international duty with Wales Under-21s.

On 23 November 2013, Taylor received a straight red card in the second half against Coventry City after a foul on Franck Moussa, despite that Tranmere won the match 5–1. Afterwards Tranmere Manager Ronnie Moore said he was disappointed with Taylor's challenge and decided against appealing the decision. Following his return, it took time for Taylor to score his first goal of the season, it came on 29 December 2013, in a 3–1 victory over Sheffield United. He then scored his second goal of the season, in a 2–1 loss against Preston North End on 8 February 2014. After the match, Taylor expressed his disappointment with the result. Taylor scored his third goal, on 22 March 2014, in a 3–2 loss against Port Vale. With Tranmere in a relegation fight, Taylor remained confident that the club would remain in League One, however on the final day of the season a home defeat against Bradford City and results elsewhere meant they were relegated to Football League Two. At the end of the season, Taylor was among five players to be offered a new contract.

=== Aberdeen (first spell) ===
Taylor signed for Scottish Premiership side Aberdeen on 28 May 2014. He made his debut for the club on 11 July 2014, against FK Daugava Riga in the Europa League first qualifying round second leg. On his league debut in the opening game of the season against Dundee United, he was criticised when his pass back to his goalkeeper was intercepted by Ryan Dow who went on to score as Aberdeen lost 3–0. Taylor scored his first goal for the Dons in a 4–0 win against Livingston in the Scottish League Cup. Taylor began to find his form from then on in and scored his first league goal in a 3–0 win against Hamilton Academical. On 15 January 2015, Taylor extended his contract with the club until 2017. Just a week after signing new contract, Taylor suffered a knee injury and had to be substituted in the 63rd minute during a 3–3 draw against Dundee. As a result, Taylor had a surgery on his knee and was out for two months. After making his return, coming as a substitute in a 4–0 loss against Celtic, Taylor scored his second goal in the next game, in a 2–1 win over Motherwell on 13 March 2015. His third goal later came on 8 April 2015, in a 1–0 win over Inverness Caledonian Thistle. Taylor made 37 appearances in all competitions as Aberdeen finished second and qualified for European Football for the second season running. At the end of the 2016–17 season, Aberdeen confirmed that Taylor would be leaving the club after playing a total of 100 league appearances.

=== Northampton Town ===
On 5 July 2017, Taylor signed a three-year contract with EFL League One club Northampton Town. He was one of 3 transfer-listed by Northampton at the end of the 2018–19 season; a further 8 were released.

=== Aberdeen (second spell) ===
On 4 June 2019, Taylor re-signed with Aberdeen on a two-year deal.

=== Walsall ===
On 7 July 2021, Taylor joined League Two side Walsall on a two-year deal. On 14 January 2022, his contract with Walsall was terminated by mutual consent.

=== Kilmarnock ===
Following Derek McInnes appointment as Kilmarnock manager Ash returned to Scotland to join Scottish Championship side Kilmarnock on an 18-month deal. Ash would score the equaliser in the penultimate game of the season against Abroath which Kilmarnock went on to win securing Kilmarnock's return to the Premiership. On the opening game of the 2022–23 Premiership season Ash would score a last minute equaliser against Dundee United at Rugby Park.

=== Bradford City ===
On 16 June 2023, Taylor signed for Bradford City on a free transfer on an initial two-year deal.

=== Gibraltar ===
On 5 June 2024, it was announced that Taylor would join Gibraltar Football League side FCB Magpies, scoring on his debut on 11 July in their UEFA Conference League qualifier against Derry City. After one season, he moved to Europa, making his debut on 22 August 2025 against Mons Calpe. He moved again in January 2026, joining Europa Point. On the 25th of February Taylor announced his retirement from professional football.

== International career ==
Taylor represented Wales under-19 in the Milk Cup in 2009.

He was named in the Wales Under-21 squad for the friendly match against Austria on 18 May 2010. Two years later, he was selected again for Wales Under-21 squad for the qualifying match against Andorra where he made his debut, coming on as a substitute in the 57th minute, in a 4–0 win.

== Personal life ==
He attended South Wirral High School and grew up in Eastham, Wirral. In 2014, he was engaged to model India Lea and planned to marry in Italy before his contract with Aberdeen began.

== Career statistics ==
As of match played 28 May 2023

Appearances and goals by club, season and competition
Club	Season	League			National cup		League cup		Other		Total	
Club	Season	Division	Apps	Goals	Apps	Goals	Apps	Goals	Apps	Goals	Apps	Goals
Tranmere Rovers	2008–09	League One	1	0	0	0	0	0	0	0	1	0
Tranmere Rovers	2009–10	League One	33	1	5	1	2	0	1 (Note: Appearance(s) in Football League Trophy)	0	41	2
Tranmere Rovers	2010–11	League One	26	0	0	0	0	0	1	0	27	0
Tranmere Rovers	2011–12	League One	37	2	1	0	0	0	3	2	41	4
Tranmere Rovers	2012–13	League One	44	2	2	0	1	0	0	0	47	2
Tranmere Rovers	2013–14	League One	42	3	1	0	3	0	1	0	47	3
Tranmere Rovers	Total		183	8	9	1	6	0	6	2	204	11
Aberdeen	2014–15	Scottish Premiership	32	3	1	0	2	1	2 (Note: Appearances in UEFA Europa League)	0	37	4
Aberdeen	2015–16	Scottish Premiership	37	4	1	0	1	0	6	0	45	4
Aberdeen	2016–17	Scottish Premiership	31	2	5	0	2	0	6	0	44	2
Aberdeen	Total		100	9	7	0	5	1	14	0	126	10
Northampton Town	2017–18	League One	45	6	2	0	1	0	4 (Note: Appearances in EFL Trophy)	1	52	7
Northampton Town	2018–19	League Two	33	0	0	0	1	0	2	0	36	0
Northampton Town	Total		78	6	2	0	2	0	6	1	88	7
Aberdeen	2019–20	Scottish Premiership	14	1	4	0	0	0	2	0	20	1
Aberdeen	2020–21	Scottish Premiership	31	1	0	0	0	0	1	0	32	1
Aberdeen	Total		45	2	4	0	0	0	3	0	52	2
Walsall	2021–22	League Two	11	1	0	0	1	0	3	0	15	1
Kilmarnock	2021–22	Scottish Championship	11	3	1	0	0	0	0	0	12	3
Kilmarnock	2022–23	Scottish Premiership	32	4	2	0	7	0	0	0	41	4
Kilmarnock	Total		43	7	3	0	7	0	3	0	53	7
Career total			460	33	25	1	21	1	32	3	538	38
