= Jake Cassidy =

Welsh footballer (born 1993)

Personal information
- Full name: Jake Ashley Cassidy
- Date of birth: 9 February 1993 (age 33)
- Place of birth: Glan Conwy, Wales
- Height: 6 ft 2 in (1.88 m)
- Position: Forward

Team information
- Current team: Silsden

Youth career
- Conwy Rovers
- –2010: Llandudno Junction
- 2010: Airbus UK Broughton

Senior career*
Years	Team	Apps	(Gls)
2009–2010	Llandudno Junction	32	(28)
2010–2015	Wolverhampton Wanderers	20	(0)
2012	→ Tranmere Rovers (loan)	10	(5)
2012–2013	→ Tranmere Rovers (loan)	26	(11)
2014	→ Tranmere Rovers (loan)	19	(1)
2014–2015	→ Notts County (loan)	16	(4)
2015	→ Southend United (loan)	17	(0)
2015–2016	Oldham Athletic	21	(0)
2016–2017	Guiseley	30	(8)
2017–2019	Hartlepool United	43	(7)
2018–2019	→ Maidstone United (loan)	16	(2)
2019	→ Maidstone United (loan)	7	(0)
2019–2020	Maidenhead United	28	(5)
2020	Stevenage	9	(1)
2020–2021	York City	12	(1)
2021–2022	Darlington	37	(5)
2022–2023	Guiseley	29	(5)
2023	Ossett United	2	(0)
2023–	Silsden		(2)

International career
2011	Wales U19	5	(1)
2011–2013	Wales U21	8	(0)
- * Club domestic league appearances and goals as of 09:33, 24 June 2024 (UTC)

Jake Ashley Cassidy (born 9 February 1993) is a Welsh professional footballer who plays as a forward for Northern Premier League Division One East club Silsden. He made well over 100 appearances in the Football League playing for Wolverhampton Wanderers, Tranmere Rovers, Notts County, Southend United, Oldham Athletic and Stevenage. He has represented Wales at both under-19 and under-21 levels.

== Club career ==
Cassidy joined Welsh Alliance club Llandudno Junction aged 16, where he made an immediate impact in his first season, scoring 28 times in 32 appearances in the 2009–10 season.

His debut season earned him a move to Welsh Premier League side Airbus UK Broughton in Summer 2010, and his impressive appearances for the club in a series of pre-season games saw him immediately depart for Wolverhampton Wanderers. He signed a two-year deal (with an option for a third) with the English Premier League side for an undisclosed fee following a short trial.

In March 2012, he moved on loan to League One side Tranmere Rovers, in a move later extended to run until the end of the season. He made his professional debut on 17 March 2012 in a 1–1 draw at Sheffield United, and scored in his second appearance, a 2–0 win at Rochdale. In total, he scored five times in ten appearances.

Ahead of the 2012–13 season the striker returned for a second loan period with Tranmere Rovers, a move which lasted until January 2013. He scored his first goals of his return with a hat-trick against Colchester United in a 4–0 win on 1 September 2012 that put Tranmere top of the league. Cassidy was named the League One Player of the Month for September 2012, after scoring seven league goals during the month. He returned to Wolves after his loan spell ended having scored 11 goals in 26 appearances.

Cassidy made his Wolves debut as a substitute in the club's FA Cup elimination at Luton Town on 5 January 2013, the final game of Ståle Solbakken's tenure, before being selected to start Wolves' next league game by their new manager Dean Saunders. He made six league appearances as the club unsuccessfully fought to avoid relegation to League One.

At the start of the 2013–14 season, under new manager Kenny Jackett, Cassidy became a regular member of Wolves' matchday squads, starting several matches and appearing often as a substitute. However, he failed to score in any of these games.

In January 2014 he joined Tranmere Rovers for a third loan spell, after a three-month deal was agreed. This loan spell, however, was less successful than his previous two as he scored just once in 19 appearances as the club struggled to avoid relegation.

After having signed a new one-year contract at Wolves (with an option for a further year), he was loaned to League One team Notts County in July 2014 until January 2015, during which time he scored four times during 20 appearances.

On 15 January 2015, he was loaned out for the rest of the season to League Two side Southend United. He won a play-off final promotion medal with Southend United.

On 23 June 2015, Cassidy signed for Oldham Athletic on a two-year contract with effect from 1 July plus an option for a further year. His contract was mutually terminated on 31 August 2016 after just one season.

In October, Cassidy signed a short-term contract – later extended to the end of the 2016–17 season – with National League club Guiseley, for which he scored eight goals in 34 games. At the end of the season he joined Hartlepool United on a two-year deal. He scored 7 goals in 44 games for Pools, and had two loan spells with Maidstone United during the 2018–19 season, scoring 4 goals in 30 games. Cassidy joined Maidenhead United for the 2019–20 season.

Cassidy signed for League Two club Stevenage for a five-figure fee on 14 January 2020. He was released at the end of the season.

Cassidy signed for York City on 18 August 2020. He made 15 appearances for the Minstermen in the curtailed 2020–21 season, scoring one goal.

Cassidy joined National League North club Darlington in July 2021, and was one of six debutants in the starting eleven for their first match of the season, a 3–2 defeat at home to Alfreton Town. He opened the scoring in the next match two days later with the aid of an errant defensive clearance, but hosts Curzon Ashton came back to win 2–1. He scored five goals from 37 league appearances, but was one of ten players released at the end of the season.

On 27 May 2022, he signed for newly relegated Northern Premier League Premier Division club Guiseley, returning to Nethermoor after five years away.

Cassidy joined Northern Premier League First Division East club Ossett United on 29 September 2023. He played only three matches before moving on to Silsden of the Northern Counties East Premier Division, for whom he scored four goals from 25 appearances.

== International career ==
Cassidy was capped by Wales at both under-19 and under-21 levels. He scored once for the under-19s, against Scotland in September 2011.

== Career statistics ==
As of end of 2023–24 season

Appearances and goals by club, season and competition
Club	Season	League			FA Cup		League Cup		Other		Total	
Club	Season	Division	Apps	Goals	Apps	Goals	Apps	Goals	Apps	Goals	Apps	Goals
Wolverhampton Wanderers	2012–13	Championship	6	0	1	0	―		―		7	0
Wolverhampton Wanderers	2013–14	League One	14	0	2	0	1	0	1 (Note: Appearances in Football League Trophy)	0	18	0
Wolverhampton Wanderers	Total		20	0	3	0	1	0	1	0	25	0
Tranmere Rovers (loan)	2011–12	League One	10	5	―		―		―		10	5
Tranmere Rovers (loan)	2012–13	League One	26	11	0	0	1	0	1	0	28	11
Tranmere Rovers (loan)	2013–14	League One	19	1	―		―		―		19	1
Tranmere Rovers (loan)	Total		55	17	0	0	1	0	1	0	57	17
Notts County (loan)	2014–15	League One	16	3	1	0	1	0	2	1	20	4
Southend United (loan)	2014–15	League Two	17	0	―		―		―		17	0
Oldham Athletic	2015–16	League One	21	0	1	0	1	0	0	0	23	0
Oldham Athletic	2016–17	League One	0	0	―		2	0	―		2	0
Oldham Athletic	Total		21	0	1	0	3	0	0	0	25	0
Guiseley	2016–17	National League	30	8	2	0	―		2 (Note: Appearances in FA Trophy)	0	34	8
Hartlepool United	2017–18	National League	35	5	0	0	―		1	0	36	5
Hartlepool United	2018–19	National League	8	2	―		―		―		8	2
Hartlepool United	Total		43	7	0	0	―		1	0	44	7
Maidstone United (loan)	2018–19	National League	23	2	3	0	―		4	2	30	4
Maidenhead United	2019–20	National League	28	5	3	1	―		1	0	32	6
Stevenage	2019–20	League Two	9	1	―		―		1 (Note: Appearance in EFL Trophy)	0	10	1
York City	2020–21	National League North	12	1	2	0	―		1	0	15	1
Darlington	2021–22	National League North	37	5	2	0	―		0	0	39	5
Guiseley	2022–23	Northern Premier League; Premier Division	29	5	2	1	―		3	1	34	7
Ossett United	2023–24	Northern Premier League; Division One East	2	0	―		―		1 (Note: Appearance in West Riding County Cup)	0	3	0
Silsden	2023–24	Northern Counties East League; Premier Division		2	0	0	―			2 (Note: Goals in FA Vase)	25	4
Career total			342	56	19	2	6	0	18	6	411	64

== Honours ==
Wolverhampton Wanderers

- Football League One: 2013–14

Southend United

- Football League Two play-offs: 2015
