= James Wallace (English footballer) =

English footballer

Personal information
- Full name: James Robert Wallace
- Date of birth: 19 December 1991 (age 34)
- Place of birth: Liverpool, England
- Height: 5 ft 11 in (1.80 m)
- Position: Midfielder

Youth career
- 2005–2009: Everton

Senior career*
Years	Team	Apps	(Gls)
2009–2012	Everton	0	(0)
2010	→ Bury (loan)	0	(0)
2011	→ Stockport County (loan)	14	(1)
2011–2012	→ Shrewsbury Town (loan)	3	(0)
2012	→ Stevenage (loan)	0	(0)
2012	→ Tranmere Rovers (loan)	18	(2)
2012–2014	Tranmere Rovers	37	(4)
2014–2017	Sheffield United	14	(0)
2016	→ Shrewsbury Town (loan)	7	(0)
2016−2017	→ Tranmere Rovers (loan)	3	(0)
2017–2018	Tranmere Rovers	8	(0)
2018–2019	Fleetwood Town	18	(1)
Total		122	(8)

International career
2009	England U19	2	(0)
2011	England U20	4	(0)
- * Club domestic league appearances and goals

James Robert Wallace (born 19 December 1991) is an English former footballer who played as a midfielder. He is the current chief scout at Preston North End. He started his career at Everton's youth academy aged 13, and progressed through the club's youth system before playing regularly for the reserve side. Following a string of loans to Bury, Stockport County, Shrewsbury Town, Stevenage and Tranmere Rovers, he eventually left Everton without playing a league game, joining Tranmere on a permanent basis in 2012 and then Sheffield United in 2014. Born in Liverpool, Wallace has represented England at under-19 and under-20 level, despite having represented the Republic of Ireland at under-16 level.

== Club career ==
=== Everton ===
Wallace joined Everton's youth academy at 13, before joining the reserves and ultimately progressing to the senior squad. He made his competitive debut for Everton against Sigma Olomouc in the UEFA Europa League in August 2009, coming on as a 66th-minute substitute in a 1–1 draw in Olomouc. It was to be Wallace's only first-team appearance of the 2009–10 campaign, as he was sidelined later that year with a double hernia problem that subsequently kept him out of action until 2010.

After making no first-team appearance at the start of Everton's 2010–11 season, Wallace joined Bury on a one-month loan deal in November 2010. He made his debut for the club two days later, in an FA Cup Second Round match against Peterborough United, playing the whole game in a 2–1 defeat. Wallace made no further appearances for Bury during his one-month loan spell due to the adverse weather conditions that resulted in a spate of postponements throughout December 2010, and the player returned to his parent club shortly before the start of 2011.

In February 2011, Wallace was loaned out, this time joining relegation threatened League Two side Stockport County, with the deal running for a month. He made a scoring debut for Stockport in a game against Macclesfield Town, scoring the opening goal of the game with a "superb 25-yard strike", although the club went on to lose the match 4–1. Wallace played in five games during his loan spell as Stockport had a brief up-turn in form, and the loan deal was later extended to the end of the 2010–11 season. Towards the latter stages of the campaign, Wallace was made Stockport captain, and made a total of 14 appearances during his three-month spell with the club, scoring one goal. On returning to Everton, Wallace was handed a new one-year contract with the club.

Wallace did not feature in any of Everton's pre-season fixtures ahead of the 2011–12 campaign, and was again a regular for the club's reserve side at the start of the season. After making no first-team appearances, Wallace signed for League Two side Shrewsbury Town on 3 November 2011, joining the club on a month's loan. Shrewsbury manager Graham Turner stated that he had previously tried to sign Wallace on a number of occasions, but was unable to bring the player to the club as a result of Wallace's international commitmentsand injury problems. Wallace made his debut for Shrewsbury in a 2–0 victory at Dagenham & Redbridge two days after joining the club, although was sent off after just 25 minutes for a "lunge" on Dagenham's Jon Nurse. As a result of the red card, Wallace missed Shrewsbury's three next games. Wallaces loan spell was extended for a further month on at the end of November, with Turner stating – "We want to see more of him. He wants to see more of us". Wallace only made one further appearance for Shrewsbury, but despite only playing three times for the club in the space of two months due to the three-match suspension and injury problems, Turner stated a desire to renew the loan deal for a third time – "Wallace hasn't had the best time here – he's only played about 40 minutes in his two months with us due to not being able to play in the FA Cup, suspension and injuries. I want him to get back to Everton get his injury cleared up, and we'll take it on from there".

After just four days back at Everton, Wallace joined League One club Stevenage on a one-month loan deal in January 2012. Following Stevenage manager Graham Westley's departure to Preston North End, Wallace's loan spell at Stevenage was cancelled by mutual consent on two weeks later, with the player having made no first-team appearances for the club.

Three days after leaving Stevenage, Wallace signed a one-month loan deal with Tranmere Rovers, making his debut two days later in a 2–1 away defeat to Bournemouth. In February 2012, Tranmere extended Wallace's loan deal a further month, before Wallace scored his first goal for the club in a 2–0 win over Rochdale in March.

=== Tranmere Rovers ===
At the end of the season, Wallace was linked with clubs in the Championship and League One, but joined Tranmere Rovers on a permanent basis. His move delighted manager Ronnie Moore, who said, "I'm delighted that James will be returning to the club as we were really keen to sign him. He was fantastic for us last season and played a big part in our climb up the table; he's got bags of energy, tackles well, can pick out a pass and has goals in him too. He's turned down some big clubs to come to us, which shows how much he enjoyed it here last season. It's a big signing for the club, and I think we've got a very good player on our hands. He's a leader, a talker and he'll make an excellent captain for the club."

=== Sheffield United ===
After Wallace's contract with Tranmere expired after two seasons, he went on to sign a two-year deal with Sheffield United on 13 June 2014. Wallace's time at the Blades was blighted by injuries which hampered his spell at the club.

==== Shrewsbury Town (loan) ====
Wallace joined Shrewsbury Town on loan until the end of the season in January 2016, linking up once again with the club he had a brief spell with in 2011. He was sidelined for a lengthy period after picking up a knee injury in a league match against Southend United the following month, making a total of eight appearances in all competitions before his loan expired in May.

=== Return to Tranmere Rovers ===
Wallace re-joined Tranmere Rovers on an initial short-term loan deal on 28 November 2016. He rejoined the club on a permanent basis in January 2017, signing an 18-month contract.

=== Fleetwood Town ===
When Wallace did not agree a new contract with Tranmere, he was snapped up by League One side Fleetwood Town.

== Later career ==
After retiring at the end of the 2018–19 season, Wallace became Fleetwood Town's chief scout. In June 2022, he was appointed in the same role at Preston North End.

== International career ==
=== Republic of Ireland ===
Wallace previously played for Republic of Ireland at under-16 level, and participated in the 2007 Montaigu Tournament for the Republic of Ireland. However, it was later found that he was not eligible to play for the Republic of Ireland national team.

=== England ===
Wallace was subsequently called up to represent the England U19 side in March 2009, although he was an unused substitute in a 0–0 draw with Czech Republic at the Bescot Stadium. Wallace made his debut for the England U19s in September 2009, coming on as a second-half substitute, replacing Andros Townsend, in a 2–1 victory against Russia, and made his first U19 start for England the following month, playing the whole game as England beat Finland 3–1.

Wallace was called up to represent the England U20 squad in February 2011, playing in a 2–1 defeat to France, and was later named in Brian Eastick's 21-man squad to represent the England U20s at the 2011 FIFA U-20 World Cup, which took place in Colombia throughout July and August 2011. Wallace was an unused substitute in England's first group match, a 0–0 draw with North Korea, Wallace made his first appearance in the next match against Argentina, which also ended goalless. Wallace made two further appearances for England under-20s, both as a substitute, as England were eventually knocked out 1–0 by Nigeria.

== Personal life ==
Born in Fazakerley, Liverpool, Wallace is the nephew of former Doncaster Rovers footballer Gregg Blundell. As of 2026, his son, Blake, is in the Everton Football Club academy and is signed until 2028, where he'll be in Under 15s.

== Career statistics ==
=== Club ===
Appearances and goals by club, season and competition
Club	Season	League			FA Cup		League Cup		Other		Total	
Club	Season	Division	Apps	Goals	Apps	Goals	Apps	Goals	Apps	Goals	Apps	Goals
Everton	2009–10	Premier League	0	0	0	0	0	0	1 (Note: Appearance(s) in UEFA Europa League)	0	1	0
Everton	2010–11	Premier League	0	0	0	0	0	0	—		0	0
Everton	2011–12	Premier League	0	0	0	0	0	0	—		0	0
Everton	Total		0	0	0	0	0	0	1	0	1	0
Bury (loan)	2010–11	League Two	0	0	1	0	—		—		1	0
Stockport County (loan)	2010–11	League Two	14	1	—		—		—		14	1
Shrewsbury Town (loan)	2011–12	League Two	3	0	0	0	—		—		3	0
Tranmere Rovers (loan)	2011–12	League One	18	2	—		—		—		18	2
Tranmere Rovers	2012–13	League One	19	2	2	0	2	0	0	0	23	2
Tranmere Rovers	2013–14	League One	18	2	1	0	0	0	0	0	19	2
Tranmere Rovers	Total		37	4	3	0	2	0	0	0	42	4
Sheffield United	2014–15	League One	10	0	1	0	2	0	0	0	13	0
Sheffield United	2015–16	League One	4	0	0	0	2	0	1 (Note: Appearance(s) in Football League Trophy)	0	7	0
Sheffield United	2016–17	League One	0	0	0	0	0	0	0	0	0	0
Sheffield United	Total		14	0	1	0	4	0	1	0	20	0
Shrewsbury Town (loan)	2015–16	League One	7	0	1	0	—		—		8	0
Tranmere Rovers (loan)	2016–17	National League	3	0	—		—		0	0	3	0
Tranmere Rovers	2016–17	National League	6	0	—		—		2 (Note: Appearance(s) in National League play-offs)	0	8	0
Tranmere Rovers	2017–18	National League	2	0	0	0	—		0	0	2	0
Tranmere Rovers	Total		8	0	0	0	—		2	0	10	0
Fleetwood Town	2018–19	League One	18	1	3	0	1	0	2	0	24	1
Career total			122	8	9	0	7	0	6	0	144	8
