= List of Tranmere Rovers F.C. managers =

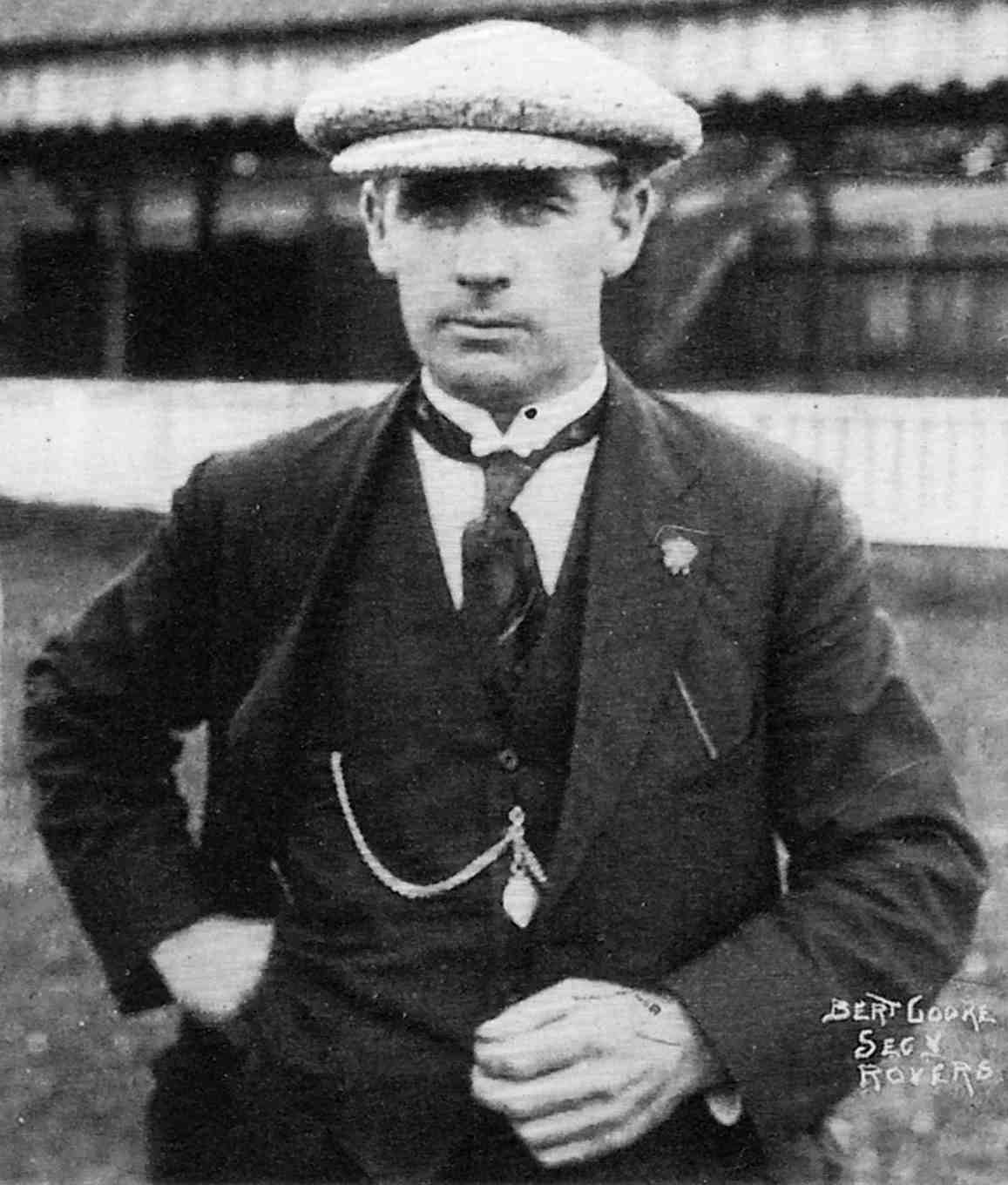
Bert Cooke in 1921

Tranmere Rovers Football Club are an English team founded in 1884, and based in Birkenhead, Wirral. As of the end of the 2014–15 season, the club has had 28 managers. The first man to hold this position was Bert Cooke, appointed in 1912. He oversaw the club's entry into the Football League and remained in charge for 23 years, the longest spell of any manager at the club. Major changes were not seen until businessman Dave Russell took over in 1961. His introductions included the team's current all-white kit and regularly arranged floodlit home fixtures on Friday evenings rather than the usual Saturday afternoon.

Tranmere's most successful period came at the end of the twentieth century. John King returned for his third spell at the club in 1987, having previously both played and managed the team. He led them to victory in the League Trophy, and from the bottom of the Fourth Division to reach the play-offs for promotion to the Premier League on three occasions. Success continued under King's replacement, John Aldridge, including an appearance in the 2000 Football League Cup Final.

After Ronnie Moore was sacked in April 2014, assistant John McMahon took over once again as caretaker manager, but he could not stop the club from being relegated into League Two. At the end of 2014, the club announced the appointment of Rob Edwards as their new manager, but following a further decline which had seen Tranmere slump to the bottom of League Two, he was sacked on 13 October 2014. He was followed by the former Leicester City manager Micky Adams, but shortly before the club's relegation from League Two was confirmed in April 2015, he in turn was dismissed and replaced by Gary Brabin. Brabin left the club in September 2016.

== History ==
From their foundation in 1884 until they became a limited company, Tranmere Rovers were run under the presidency of local businessman James McGaul. The first man to hold a position equivalent to what is today referred to as a manager was Bert Cooke, who was appointed manager in 1912, though the directors continued to choose the team for each game. Cooke stayed in charge for 23 years, the longest spell of any manager at the club. He oversaw the club's victory in the Lancashire Combination in 1914, promotion to the Central League in 1919 and, as founder members of Division Three North, their first Football League match on 27 August 1921. He also developed a string of talented local youngsters, including Dixie Dean and Pongo Waring. However, in 1935, Cooke's career ended in discredit; following illegal payments to directors and players, he was sacked and replaced by Jack Carr.

Jim Knowles, a former film extra, took over the following year and led the club to the Division Three North championship. This remains their sole championship in the Football League. However, they were relegated the next season having won just 6 of 42 matches, the all-time worst record of any team in Division Two. Knowles left the club at the outbreak of the Second World War.

Tranmere rejoined the peacetime Football League in Division Three North and stayed there until the 1958 restructuring of the football league's lower divisions. Manager Peter Farrell led them to finish 11th in the final season of the Northern Section, securing a place in the new national Division Three where they were again founder members. The final match against Wrexham, also playing for a place in the higher league, attracted a crowd of 19,615, which remains the highest attendance at a Prenton Park league match.

In 1961, Dave Russell joined the club from Bury who were, at the time, two divisions above Tranmere. Considered a shrewd businessman, Russell made some revolutionary changes. He developed a successful youth policy which included England international Roy McFarland among its graduates. More visibly, he introduced an all-white kit to set the team apart from local rivals, Division One club Everton; these have been Tranmere's usual colours since. He also took advantage of the floodlights, regularly arranging home fixtures on Friday evenings rather than the usual Saturday afternoon. This allowed supporters to watch Tranmere on Fridays and Everton or Liverpool on Saturdays; Friday night games continued until the 1990s. Russell guided Rovers back to Division Three in 1967, a year before a new 4,000-seater main stand was opened. He became general manager in 1969, allowing Jackie Wright to take over.

John King joined the club as manager in 1975, having already made 241 appearances as a player, and spent seven years as captain. He secured promotion from the Fourth Division, but was sacked following subsequent relegation. However, in his second spell as manager from 1987, King took the team from the bottom of Division Four to the brink of English football's top league. Under his leadership, they won the League Trophy in 1990, and reached the play-offs for promotion to the newly formed Premier League in 1993, 1994, and 1995. In 1996, King was given the position of director of football and replaced by player-manager John Aldridge.

Aldridge had played a large part in Tranmere's success under King, retiring in 1998 with a total of 174 goals in 294 games. As a manager, he is remembered for the team's cup runs. Tranmere reached the 2000 Football League Cup Final, beating top-flight Middlesbrough and Coventry City, before losing 2–1 to Leicester City in the last League Cup game to be played at the original Wembley Stadium. The following season, the club progressed in the FA Cup, beating local Premier League rivals Everton 3–0 at Goodison Park, then Southampton 4–3 (after being 0–3 down), before losing to Liverpool. With the club struggling in the league, Aldridge resigned one week after the Liverpool defeat. Both King and Aldridge have been honoured in the Tranmere Hall of Fame. In 2009, long-serving club physiotherapist Les Parry took over as manager from former England international John Barnes. Parry was sacked on 4 March 2012 and replaced by Ronnie Moore.

In February 2014 it was reported that Moore was under investigation by The Football Association, for breaching its rules against betting on competitions in which his club were involved. He was suspended, and after admitting the FA's charges was sacked on 9 April 2014. On 27 May 2014, the club announced that Rob Edwards had been appointed as their new manager, but he was sacked on 13 October 2014. Former Port Vale manager Micky Adams' appointment was announced on 16 October 2014, but he in turn left the club on 19 April 2015, when the club were bottom of the league with two matches remaining. The following week, Tranmere were relegated from the Football League, ending their 94-year stay in the leagues. Gary Brabin was appointed as manager on 5 May 2015.

== Managers ==
This list comprises all those who have held the position of manager of the first team of Tranmere. Each manager's entry includes his dates of tenure and the club's overall competitive record (in terms of matches won, drawn and lost). All full-time managers are listed, along with caretaker managers where known. Statistics are correct as at the end of the match played on 9 September 2023.

List of managers
| Manager | From | To | P | W | D | L | W% | Honours | Notes | References |
|---|---|---|---|---|---|---|---|---|---|---|
| Bert Cooke | August 1912 | 30 April 1935 | 607 | 258 | 123 | 226 | 42.5 | Lancashire Combination champions 1913–14 Welsh Cup finalists 1933–34 (Note: The club also won the Welsh Cup on 4 May 1935, days after Cooke's departure.) | | (Note: Statistics from 27 August 1921.) |
| Jack Carr | 28 May 1935 | November 1936 | 60 | 27 | 17 | 16 | 45.0 | | | |
| Jim Knowles | November 1936 | January 1939 | 98 | 38 | 16 | 44 | 38.8 | Third Division North champions 1937–38 | | |
| Bill Ridding (Note: Competitive football was abandoned during the Second World War. Some sources list Jimmy Moreton (1939–42), Bill Ridding (1942–46) and Tommy Jones (1946) as managers, while other sources name only Ridding.) | January 1939 | May 1945 | 20 | 3 | 3 | 14 | 15.0 | | | |
| Ernie Blackburn | September 1946 | 13 December 1955 | 421 | 172 | 83 | 166 | 40.9 | | | |
| Noel Kelly | 13 December 1955 | September 1957 | 107 | 26 | 25 | 56 | 24.3 | | Player-manager | |
| Peter Farrell | 5 October 1957 | 12 December 1960 | 164 | 63 | 34 | 67 | 38.4 | | Player-manager | |
| Walter Galbraith | 7 January 1961 | 25 November 1961 | 43 | 20 | 3 | 20 | 46.5 | | | |
| Dave Russell | 15 December 1961 | 23 December 1969 | 379 | 167 | 82 | 130 | 44.1 | Fourth Division promotion 1966–67 | | |
| Jackie Wright | 23 December 1969 | 9 April 1972 | 109 | 25 | 48 | 36 | 22.9 | | | |
| Ron Yeats | 10 April 1972 | 4 April 1975 | 141 | 42 | 41 | 58 | 29.8 | | Player-manager | |
| John King | 13 April 1975 | 30 September 1980 | 246 | 80 | 73 | 93 | 32.5 | Fourth Division promotion 1975–76 | | |
| Bryan Hamilton | 1 October 1980 | 7 February 1985 | 205 | 67 | 56 | 82 | 32.7 | | Player-manager | |
| Frank Worthington | 9 July 1985 | 11 February 1987 | 83 | 24 | 23 | 36 | 28.9 | | Player-manager | |
| Ronnie Moore | 11 February 1987 | 13 April 1987 | 12 | 3 | 4 | 5 | 25.0 | | Player-manager | |
| John King | 13 April 1987 | 12 April 1996 | 488 | 211 | 129 | 148 | 43.2 | Third Division promotion 1990–91 Fourth Division promotion 1988–89; League Trophy champions 1989–90; League Trophy finalists 1990–91 | | |
| John Aldridge | 12 April 1996 | 17 March 2001 | 269 | 93 | 78 | 98 | 34.6 | League Cup finalists 1999–2000 | Player-manager | |
| Ray Mathias Kevin Sheedy | 18 March 2001 | 7 May 2001 | 11 | 1 | 3 | 7 | 9.1 | | Caretakers | |
| Dave Watson | 20 May 2001 | 1 August 2002 | 55 | 22 | 15 | 18 | 40.0 | | | |
| Ray Mathias | 1 August 2002 | 29 September 2003 | 66 | 29 | 18 | 19 | 43.9 | | | |
| John McMahon | 29 September 2003 | 12 October 2003 | 3 | 1 | 0 | 2 | 33.3 | | Caretaker (1st spell) | |
| Brian Little | 12 October 2003 | 9 June 2006 | 147 | 61 | 43 | 43 | 41.5 | | | |
| Ronnie Moore | 9 June 2006 | 5 June 2009 | 158 | 65 | 38 | 55 | 41.1 | | | |
| John Barnes | 14 June 2009 | 9 October 2009 | 14 | 3 | 1 | 10 | 21.4 | | | |
| Les Parry | 9 October 2009 | 4 March 2012 | 131 | 40 | 34 | 57 | 30.5 | | | |
| Ronnie Moore | 5 March 2012 | 17 February 2014 | 111 | 41 | 25 | 45 | 36.9 | | | |
| John McMahon | 17 February 2014 | 27 May 2014 | 6 | 1 | 1 | 4 | 16.7 | | Caretaker (2nd spell) | |
| Rob Edwards | 27 May 2014 | 13 October 2014 | 14 | 2 | 4 | 8 | 14.3 | | | |
| Micky Adams | 16 October 2014 | 19 April 2015 | 38 | 10 | 11 | 17 | 26.3 | | | |
| Alan Rogers | 19 April 2015 | 5 May 2015 | 2 | 0 | 0 | 2 | 0.0 | | Caretaker | |
| Gary Brabin | 5 May 2015 | 18 September 2016 | 60 | 28 | 15 | 17 | 46.7 | | | |
| Paul Carden | 19 September 2016 | 7 October 2016 | 3 | 1 | 1 | 1 | 33.3 | | Interim | |
| Micky Mellon | 7 October 2016 | 6 July 2020 | 198 | 91 | 45 | 62 | 46.0 | National League promotion 2017–18; League Two promotion 2018–19 | | |
| Mike Jackson | 18 July 2020 | 31 October 2020 | 13 | 3 | 5 | 5 | 23.1 | | | |
| Ian Dawes Andy Parkinson | 31 October 2020 | 21 November 2020 | 5 | 4 | 1 | 0 | 80.0 | | Caretakers | |
| Keith Hill | 21 November 2020 | 11 May 2021 | 40 | 20 | 10 | 10 | 50.0 | EFL Trophy finalists 2020–21 | | |
| Ian Dawes | 11 May 2021 | 30 May 2021 | 2 | 0 | 1 | 1 | 0.0 | | Caretaker | |
| Micky Mellon | 1 June 2021 | 19 March 2023 | 97 | 39 | 25 | 33 | 40.2 | | | |
| Ian Dawes | 20 March 2023 | 10 September 2023 | 19 | 3 | 5 | 11 | 15.8 | | | |
| Nigel Adkins | 2 November 2023 | 26 February 2025 | 72 | 23 | 16 | 33 | 31.9 | | | |
| Andy Crosby | 26 February 2025 | 4 March 2026 | 54 | 17 | 15 | 22 | 31.5 | | | |
| Andy Parkinson | 4 March 2026 | 10 March 2026 | 1 | 0 | 0 | 1 | 0.0 | | Caretaker (2nd spell) | |
| Pete Wild | 10 March 2026 | 11 May 2026 | 10 | 1 | 3 | 6 | 10.0 | | Interim | |
| Darrell Clarke | 26 May 2026 | Current | | | | | | | | |
