= 2013–14 Football League One =

Football League One
- Season: 2013–14
- Champions: Wolverhampton Wanderers (3rd divisional title)
- Promoted: Wolverhampton Wanderers; Brentford; Rotherham United
- Relegated: Tranmere Rovers; Carlisle United; Shrewsbury Town; Stevenage
- Matches: 552
- Goals: 1,473 (2.67 per match)
- Top goalscorer: 24 goals – Sam Baldock (Bristol City)
- Biggest home win: Rotherham United 6–0 Notts County (1 March 2014)
- Biggest away win: Tranmere Rovers 0–5 Peterborough United (24 August 2013)
- Highest scoring: 10 goals Wolverhampton Wanderers 6–4 Rotherham United (18 April 2014)
- Longest winning run: 9 games Wolverhampton Wanderers
- Longest unbeaten run: 19 games Brentford
- Longest winless run: 13 games Bradford City
- Longest losing run: 6 games Sheffield United
- Highest attendance: 30,110; Wolverhampton Wanderers v Rotherham United (18 April 2014)
- Lowest attendance: 1,603; Coventry City v Carlisle United (18 February 2014)
- Average attendance: 7,488

The 2013–14 Football League One (referred to as Sky Bet League One for sponsorship reasons) is the tenth season of the league under its current title and twenty-first season under its current league division format. The season began on 2 August 2013 and finished on 3 May 2014 with all matches that day kicking off simultaneously.

Of the 24 teams which participate, seventeen of these remain following the 2012–13 Football League One. They are joined by three teams from 2012–13 Football League Championship, and four teams from the 2012–13 Football League Two.

== Changes from last season ==
=== Team changes ===
The following teams have changed division since the 2012–13 season.

==== To League One ====
Promoted from League Two

- Gillingham
- Rotherham United
- Port Vale
- Bradford City

Relegated from Championship

- Bristol City
- Wolverhampton Wanderers
- Peterborough United

==== From League One ====
Relegated to League Two

- Bury
- Hartlepool United
- Portsmouth
- Scunthorpe United

Promoted to Championship

- Doncaster Rovers
- Bournemouth
- Yeovil Town

== League table ==
Pos	Team	Pld	W	D	L	GF	GA	GD	Pts	Promotion, qualification or relegation
1	Wolverhampton Wanderers (C, P)	46	31	10	5	89	31	+58	103	Promotion to Football League Championship
2	Brentford (P)	46	28	10	8	72	43	+29	94	Promotion to Football League Championship
3	Leyton Orient	46	25	11	10	85	45	+40	86	Qualification for League One play-offs (Note: Four teams play for one spot and promotion to Football League Championship.)
4	Rotherham United (O, P)	46	24	14	8	86	58	+28	86	Qualification for League One play-offs
5	Preston North End	46	23	16	7	72	46	+26	85	Qualification for League One play-offs
6	Peterborough United	46	23	5	18	72	58	+14	74	Qualification for League One play-offs
7	Sheffield United	46	18	13	15	48	46	+2	67	
8	Swindon Town	46	19	9	18	63	59	+4	66	
9	Port Vale	46	18	7	21	59	73	−14	61	
10	Milton Keynes Dons	46	17	9	20	63	65	−2	60	
11	Bradford City	46	14	17	15	57	54	+3	59	
12	Bristol City	46	13	19	14	70	67	+3	58	
13	Walsall	46	14	16	16	49	49	0	58	
14	Crawley Town	46	14	15	17	48	54	−6	57	
15	Oldham Athletic	46	14	14	18	50	59	−9	56	
16	Colchester United	46	13	14	19	53	61	−8	53	
17	Gillingham	46	15	8	23	60	79	−19	53	
18	Coventry City	46	16	13	17	74	77	−3	51 (Note: On 2 August Coventry City were deducted 10 points for exiting administration without a CVA.)	
19	Crewe Alexandra	46	13	12	21	54	80	−26	51	
20	Notts County	46	15	5	26	64	77	−13	50	
21	Tranmere Rovers (R)	46	12	11	23	52	79	−27	47	Relegation to Football League Two
22	Carlisle United (R)	46	11	12	23	43	76	−33	45	Relegation to Football League Two
23	Shrewsbury Town (R)	46	9	15	22	44	65	−21	42	Relegation to Football League Two
24	Stevenage (R)	46	11	9	26	46	72	−26	42	Relegation to Football League Two

Updated to match(es) played on 3 May 2014. Source: BBC Sport
Rules for classification: 1) Points; 2) Goal difference; 3) Number of goals scored
(C) Champions; (O) Play-off winners; (P) Promoted; (R) Relegated

== Play-offs ==
Semifinals
3	Leyton Orient	1	2	3
6	Peterborough United	1	1	2
4	Rotherham United	1	3	4
5	Preston North End	1	1	2

Final
3	Leyton Orient	2 (3)
4	Rotherham United (p)	2 (4)

== Team overview ==
=== Stadia and locations ===
Locations of League One 2013-14 teams

Team	Location	Stadium	Capacity
Bradford City	Bradford	Valley Parade	25,136
Brentford	London (Brentford)	Griffin Park	12,763
Bristol City	Bristol	Ashton Gate	21,497
Carlisle United	Carlisle	Brunton Park	16,981
Colchester United	Colchester	Colchester Community Stadium	10,064
Coventry City^{1}	Northampton	Sixfields Stadium	7,653
Crawley Town	Crawley	Checkatrade.com Stadium	5,996
Crewe Alexandra	Crewe	Alexandra Stadium	10,153
Gillingham	Gillingham	Priestfield Stadium	11,582
Leyton Orient	London (Leyton)	Matchroom Stadium	9,271
Milton Keynes Dons	Milton Keynes	Stadium:mk	30,500
Notts County	Nottingham	Meadow Lane	21,388
Oldham Athletic	Oldham	Boundary Park	10,638
Peterborough United	Peterborough	London Road Stadium	15,315
Port Vale	Stoke-on-Trent	Vale Park	19,052
Preston North End	Preston	Deepdale	23,408
Rotherham United	Rotherham	New York Stadium	12,021
Sheffield United	Sheffield	Bramall Lane	32,702
Shrewsbury Town	Shrewsbury	Greenhous Meadow	9,875
Stevenage	Stevenage	Broadhall Way	6,722
Swindon Town	Swindon	County Ground	15,728
Tranmere Rovers	Birkenhead	Prenton Park	16,789
Walsall	Walsall	Banks's Stadium	11,300
Wolverhampton Wanderers	Wolverhampton	Molineux	31,700

Bradford City	Brentford	Bristol City	Carlisle United	Colchester United	Coventry City
Valley Parade	Griffin Park	Ashton Gate	Brunton Park	Colchester Community Stadium	Sixfields Stadium ^{1}
Capacity: 25,136	Capacity: 12,763	Capacity: 21,497	Capacity: 18,202	Capacity: 10,105	Capacity: 7,653
Crawley Town	Crewe Alexandra	Gillingham	Leyton Orient	Milton Keynes Dons	Notts County
The Checkatrade.com Stadium	Alexandra Stadium	Priestfield Stadium	Matchroom Stadium	Stadium mk	Meadow Lane
Capacity: 5,996	Capacity: 10,153	Capacity: 11,582	Capacity: 9,271	Capacity: 30,500	Capacity: 20,229
Oldham Athletic	Peterborough United	Port Vale	Preston North End	Rotherham United	Sheffield United
Boundary Park	London Road	Vale Park	Deepdale	New York Stadium	Bramall Lane
Capacity: 10,638	Capacity: 15,315	Capacity: 19,052	Capacity: 24,500	Capacity: 12,021	Capacity: 32,702
Shrewsbury Town	Stevenage	Swindon Town	Tranmere Rovers	Walsall	Wolverhampton Wanderers
Greenhous Meadow	The Lamex Stadium	County Ground	Prenton Park	Banks's Stadium	Molineux
Capacity: 9,875	Capacity: 6,722	Capacity: 14,700	Capacity: 16,567	Capacity: 11,300	Capacity: 30,852

- ^{1} From 5 September 2014, Coventry played their home games at the Ricoh Arena in Coventry

=== Personnel and sponsoring ===
Note: Flags indicate national team as has been defined under FIFA eligibility rules. Players may hold more than one non-FIFA nationality.

Team	Manager	Team captain	Kit manufacturer	Shirt sponsor
Bradford City	Phil Parkinson	Gary Jones	Nike	JCT600
Brentford	Mark Warburton	Kevin O'Connor	adidas	SkyeX
Bristol City	Steve Cotterill	Sam Baldock	adidas	Blackthorn Cider
Carlisle United	Graham Kavanagh	Lee Miller	Fila	Eddie Stobart
Colchester United	Joe Dunne	Brian Wilson	Puma	Weston Homes (H); JobServe (A)
Coventry City	Steven Pressley	Carl Baker	Puma	None
Crawley Town	John Gregory	Josh Simpson	Puma	32Red
Crewe Alexandra	Steve Davis	Abdul Osman	Carbrini	Mornflake Oats
Gillingham	Peter Taylor (interim)	Adam Barrett	Vandanel	Medway Electrical & Mechanical Services
Leyton Orient	Russell Slade	Nathan Clarke	Nike	Samsung (H); FIFA 14 (A)
Milton Keynes Dons	Karl Robinson	Dean Lewington	Sondico	Case Security
Notts County	Shaun Derry	Dean Leacock	Fila	3663 (H); Vision Express (A & 3rd)
Oldham Athletic	Lee Johnson	Korey Smith	Fila	Blacks
Peterborough United	Darren Ferguson	Tommy Rowe	Nike	Stadium Energy
Port Vale	Micky Adams	Doug Loft	Sondico	GMB
Preston North End	Simon Grayson	John Welsh	Nike	The Carers' Trust
Rotherham United	Steve Evans	Craig Morgan	Puma	Parkgate Shopping (H); TGB Sheds (A)
Sheffield United	Nigel Clough	Michael Doyle	Macron	VSportsGames (H); Topspring (A & 3rd)
Shrewsbury Town	Michael Jackson	Tamika Mkandawire	Surridge	Greenhous
Stevenage	Graham Westley	Jon Ashton	Fila	STS Tyre Pros
Swindon Town	Mark Cooper	Darren Ward	adidas	Samsung(H); FIFA 14 (A)
Tranmere Rovers	John McMahon (interim)	James Wallace	Fila	Home Bargains
Walsall	Dean Smith	Andy Butler	Diadora	CAT communications
Wolverhampton Wanderers	Kenny Jackett	Sam Ricketts	Puma	What House?

==== Managerial changes ====
Team	Outgoing manager	Manner of departure	Date of vacancy	Position in table	Incoming manager	Date of appointment
Swindon Town	Kevin MacDonald	Mutual Consent	13 July 2013	Pre-season	Mark Cooper	13 July 2013
Carlisle United	Greg Abbott	Sacked	9 September 2013	22nd	Graham Kavanagh	1 October 2013
Sheffield United	David Weir	Sacked	11 October 2013	23rd	Nigel Clough	23 October 2013
Gillingham	Martin Allen	Sacked	13 October 2013	17th	Peter Taylor	11 November 2013
Notts County	Chris Kiwomya	Sacked	27 October 2013	24th	Shaun Derry	6 November 2013
Crawley Town	Richie Barker	Sacked	27 November 2013	12th	John Gregory	3 December 2013
Bristol City	Sean O'Driscoll	Sacked	28 November 2013	22nd	Steve Cotterill	3 December 2013
Brentford	Uwe Rösler	Signed by Wigan Athletic	7 December 2013	4th	Mark Warburton	10 December 2013
Shrewsbury	Graham Turner	Resigned	21 January 2014	21st	Micky Mellon	12 May 2014
Tranmere Rovers	Ronnie Moore	Sacked	9 April 2014	19th	Rob Edwards	27 May 2014

== Results ==
Home \ Away	BRA	BRE	BRI	CRL	COL	COV	CRA	CRE	GIL	LEY	MKD	NTC	OLD	PET	PTV	PNE	ROT	SHU	SHR	STE	SWI	TRA	WAL	WOL
Bradford City		4–0	1–1	4–0	2–2	3–3	2–1	3–3	1–1	1–1	1–0	1–1	2–3	1–0	1–0	0–0	0–1	2–0	2–1	2–3	1–1	0–1	0–2	1–2
Brentford	2–0		3–1	0–0	3–1	3–1	1–0	5–0	2–1	0–2	3–1	3–1	1–0	3–2	2–0	1–0	0–1	3–1	1–0	2–0	3–2	2–0	1–0	0–3
Bristol City	2–2	1–2		2–1	1–1	1–2	2–0	0–0	2–1	2–2	2–2	2–1	1–1	0–3	5–0	1–1	1–2	0–1	1–1	4–1	0–0	2–2	1–0	1–2
Carlisle United	1–0	0–0	2–4		2–4	0–4	1–1	2–1	1–2	1–5	3–0	2–1	0–1	2–1	0–1	0–1	1–2	1–0	0–0	0–0	1–0	4–1	1–1	2–2
Colchester United	0–2	4–1	2–2	1–1		2–1	1–1	1–2	3–0	1–2	3–1	0–4	0–1	1–0	1–0	1–2	0–0	0–1	1–0	4–0	1–2	1–2	1–1	0–3
Coventry City	0–0	0–2	5–4	1–2	2–0		2–2	2–2	2–1	3–1	1–2	3–0	1–1	4–2	2–2	4–4	0–3	3–2	0–0	1–0	1–2	1–5	2–1	1–1
Crawley Town	1–0	0–1	1–1	0–0	1–0	3–2		1–2	3–2	2–1	0–2	1–0	1–0	1–0	0–3	2–2	1–2	0–2	1–1	1–1	0–0	2–0	0–0	2–1
Crewe Alexandra	0–0	1–3	1–0	2–1	0–0	1–2	1–0		0–3	1–2	2–0	1–3	1–1	2–2	1–2	2–1	3–3	3–0	1–1	0–3	1–1	2–1	0–3	0–2
Gillingham	0–1	1–1	1–1	1–0	0–1	4–2	1–0	1–3		1–2	3–2	2–1	0–1	2–2	3–2	1–2	3–4	0–1	1–1	3–2	2–0	2–0	2–2	1–0
Leyton Orient	0–1	0–1	1–3	4–0	2–1	2–0	2–3	2–0	5–1		2–1	5–1	1–1	1–2	3–2	0–1	1–0	1–1	3–0	2–0	2–0	2–0	1–1	1–3
Milton Keynes Dons	2–3	2–2	2–2	0–1	0–0	1–3	0–2	1–0	0–1	1–3		3–1	2–1	0–2	3–0	0–0	3–2	0–1	3–2	4–1	1–1	0–1	1–0	0–1
Notts County	3–0	0–1	1–1	4–1	2–0	3–0	1–0	4–0	3–1	0–0	1–3		3–2	2–4	4–2	0–1	0–1	2–1	2–3	0–1	2–0	2–0	1–5	0–1
Oldham Athletic	1–1	0–0	1–1	1–0	0–2	0–0	1–0	1–1	1–0	1–1	1–2	1–1		5–4	3–1	1–3	0–2	1–1	1–2	1–0	2–1	0–1	0–1	0–3
Peterborough United	2–1	1–3	1–2	4–1	2–0	1–0	0–2	4–2	2–0	1–3	2–1	4–3	2–1		0–0	2–0	0–1	0–0	1–0	0–1	1–0	3–0	0–0	1–0
Port Vale	2–1	1–1	1–1	2–1	2–0	3–2	2–1	1–3	2–1	0–2	1–0	2–1	1–0	0–1		0–2	2–0	1–2	3–1	2–2	2–3	3–2	1–0	1–3
Preston North End	2–2	0–3	1–0	6–1	1–1	1–1	1–0	0–2	3–1	1–1	2–2	2–0	2–1	3–1	3–2		3–3	0–0	5–2	3–0	2–1	1–1	2–1	0–0
Rotherham United	0–0	3–0	2–1	0–0	2–2	1–3	2–2	4–2	4–1	2–1	2–2	6–0	3–2	0–1	1–0	0–0		3–1	2–2	2–1	0–4	1–1	1–1	3–3
Sheffield United	2–2	0–0	3–0	1–0	1–1	2–1	1–1	3–1	1–2	1–1	0–1	2–1	1–1	2–0	2–1	0–1	1–0		2–0	1–0	1–0	3–1	1–1	0–2
Shrewsbury Town	2–1	1–1	2–3	2–2	1–1	1–1	1–1	1–3	2–0	0–2	0–0	1–0	1–2	2–4	0–0	0–1	0–3	2–0		1–0	2–0	0–1	0–1	0–1
Stevenage	1–1	2–1	1–3	1–3	2–3	0–1	2–0	1–0	3–1	0–1	2–3	0–1	3–4	0–1	1–1	1–1	0–3	0–0	1–3		2–0	3–1	3–2	0–0
Swindon Town	1–0	1–0	3–2	3–1	0–0	2–1	1–1	5–0	2–2	1–3	1–2	2–0	0–1	2–1	5–2	1–0	1–2	2–1	3–1	1–0		1–0	1–3	1–4
Tranmere Rovers	1–2	3–4	1–1	0–0	2–1	3–1	3–3	1–0	1–2	0–4	3–2	3–2	2–2	0–5	0–1	1–2	1–2	0–0	2–1	0–0	1–2		1–1	1–1
Walsall	0–2	1–1	0–1	2–0	0–1	0–1	1–2	1–1	1–1	1–1	0–3	1–1	1–0	2–0	0–2	0–3	1–1	2–1	1–0	2–1	1–1	3–1		0–3
Wolverhampton Wanderers	2–0	0–0	3–1	3–0	4–2	1–1	2–1	2–0	4–0	1–1	0–2	2–0	2–0	2–0	3–0	2–0	6–4	2–0	0–0	2–0	3–2	2–0	0–1	

Updated to match(es) played on 3 May 2014. Source: http://www.football-league.co.uk/page/ResultsSearch/0,,10794~2013000025,00.html
Legend: Blue = home team win; Yellow = draw; Red = away team win.

== Season statistics ==
=== Top scorers ===
As of 3 May 2014.

Rank	Player	Club	Goals
1	(England) Sam Baldock	Bristol City	24
2	(Democratic Republic of the Congo) Britt Assombalonga	Peterborough United	23
3	(England) Kieran Agard	Rotherham United	21
3	(England) Callum Wilson	Coventry City	21
5	(England) Ryan Lowe	Tranmere Rovers	19
5	(Republic of Ireland) Dave Mooney	Leyton Orient	19
7	(England) Joe Garner	Preston North End	18
8	(Mali) Nouha Dicko	Rotherham United/Wolverhampton Wanderers	17
8	(Jamaica) Clayton Donaldson	Brentford	17
8	(England) Cody McDonald	Gillingham	17

=== Scoring ===
- First goal: Kevin McDonald for Sheffield United against Notts County (2 August 2013)
- Fastest goal: 12 seconds
  - Kieran Agard for Rotherham United against Gillingham (3 April 2014 )
- Largest winning margin: 6 goals
  - Rotherham United 6–0 Notts County (1 March 2014)
- Highest scoring game: 10 goals
  - Wolverhampton Wanderers 6–4 Rotherham United (18 April 2014)
- Most goals scored in a match by a single team: 6 goals
  - Rotherham United 6–0 Notts County (1 March 2014)
  - Preston North End 6–1 Carlisle United (12 April 2014)
  - Wolverhampton Wanderers 6–4 Rotherham United (18 April 2014)
- Most goals scored in a match by a losing team: 4 goals
  - Coventry 5–4 Bristol City (12 August 2013)
  - Oldham 5–4 Peterborough United (25 January 2014)
  - Wolverhampton Wanderers 6–4 Rotherham United (18 April 2014)
