= Ian Dawes =

Ian Dawes is the name of:

- Ian Dawes (footballer, born 1963), footballer for QPR and Millwall, manager for Redhill
- Ian Dawes (footballer, born 1984), footballer for Lancaster City and Marine, manager for Tranmere Rovers
