= 2018 National League play-off final =

- Event: 2017–18 National League
Boreham Wood	Tranmere Rovers
1	2
- Date: 12 May 2018
- Venue: Wembley Stadium, London
- Referee: Neil Hair
- Attendance: 16,306

The 2018 National League play-off final, known as the Vanarama National League Promotion Final for sponsorship reasons, was a football match played at Wembley Stadium in London on 12 May 2018 to decide the second team to be promoted from the National League to EFL League Two for the 2018–19 season. The culmination of the 2018 National League play-offs saw Tranmere Rovers beat Boreham Wood to earn promotion alongside the National League champions Macclesfield Town.

Boreham Wood entered the play-offs having finished fourth in the 2017–18 National League while Tranmere Rovers finished two places above in second. The play-off format was changed for this season with second and third place teams receiving a bye to the semi-finals while the fourth to seventh place teams played a qualifying round to determine the other two semi-finalists. Boreham Wood beat seventh-placed AFC Fylde 2–1 in their qualifying round and third-placed Sutton United 3–2 in the semi-final. Tranmere faced sixth-placed Ebbsfleet United in their semi-final, after Ebbsfleet beat Aldershot Town in the other qualifying round via a penalty-shootout, Tranmere won 4–2 to reach the final.

After only 54 seconds, Tranmere's Liam Ridehalgh was sent off for a two-footed challenge on Ricky Shakes. Nonetheless, Andy Cook soon scored to give Tranmere the lead. Rovers quickly sent on substitute Eddie Clarke, a specialist left-back. They then had to make another substitution, Connor Jennings for Josh Ginnelly, after Ginnelly was hit by a glass bottle thrown by a Boreham Wood fan. Just before half-time, Rovers had to make their final substitution because of injury. Bruno Andrade immediately equalised.

After 80 minutes, the substitute Jennings crossed for James Norwood to score the winning goal for Tranmere.

== Match ==
=== Details ===
12 May 2018
15:00

Boreham Wood	1–2	Tranmere Rovers
Andrade 45+8'	Report	Cook 6'; Norwood 80'

Wembley Stadium, London
Attendance: 16,306

Boreham Wood	Tranmere Rovers

GK	1	Grant Smith
CB	6	David Stephens
CB	3	Danny Woodards	(substituted off) 83'
CB	23	Scott Doe
RM	7	Ricky Shakes
CM	8	Tom Champion
CM	4	Mark Ricketts
LM	11	Bruno Andrade
AM	19	Ángelo Balanta	(yellow card) 40'
FW	10	Keiran Murtagh
FW	20	Michael Folivi	(yellow card) 61'	(substituted off) 70'
Substitutes:
GK	21	Fred Burbidge
DF	24	Alex Davey
DF	5	Ollie Harfield
MF	22	Sorba Thomas	(substituted in) 83'
FW	12	Joe Quigley	(substituted in) 70'
Manager:
Luke Garrard

GK	1	Scott Davies
RB	4	Ritchie Sutton	(substituted off) 45+5'
CB	5	Steve McNulty
CB	33	Manny Monthé
LB	3	Liam Ridehalgh	(red card) 1'
RM	29	Larnell Cole	(substituted off) 9'
CM	15	Oliver Norburn
CM	24	Jeff Hughes
LM	18	Josh Ginnelly	(substituted off) 34'
CF	9	Andy Cook
CF	10	James Norwood
Substitutes:
GK	22	Rhys Taylor
DF	31	Eddie Clarke	(substituted in) 9'
MF	8	Jay Harris	(substituted in) 45+5'
FW	11	Connor Jennings	(substituted in) 34'	(yellow card) 88'
FW	19	Andy Mangan
Manager:
Micky Mellon
