= Ian Dawes (footballer, born 1984) =

English football manager

Personal information
- Date of birth: 16 March 1984 (age 42)
- Place of birth: Liverpool, England
- Height: 1.73 m (5 ft 8 in)
- Position: Midfielder

Youth career
- Everton
- Liverpool

Senior career*
Years	Team	Apps	(Gls)
- Calgary Storm
- Lancaster City
- Marine
- Caernarfon Town

Managerial career
- 2013–2014: Floriana
- 2016–2017: Bangor City
- 2020–2023: Tranmere Rovers (assistant)
- 2020: Tranmere Rovers (joint-caretaker)
- 2021: Tranmere Rovers (caretaker)
- 2023: Tranmere Rovers
- * Club domestic league appearances and goals

Ian Dawes (born 16 March 1984) is an English football manager who was most recently the manager of EFL League Two side Tranmere Rovers.

== Career ==
Dawes was born in Liverpool, and played for Everton at schoolboy level before moving to Liverpool. After being released from Liverpool at 19 he then moved to Canada to play for Calgary Storm. Upon returning to Britain, he played for non-league clubs including Lancaster City and Marine. Whilst playing non league football he returned to former club Liverpool FC as an academy coach and spent ten years there before moving to Malta where he was head coach at Floriana. He then coached at Shrewsbury Town, and became head coach at Bangor City in November 2016.

He left Bangor in 2017, after just four months at the club, and later the same year joined Blackpool as first team coach. In August 2020, he moved to Tranmere Rovers as assistant to Mike Jackson, and took over as caretaker manager when Jackson was sacked in November 2020. In his five games in charge, he led the club to four wins, including beating League One team, Accrington Stanley in the FA Cup, and a penalty shootout victory against Wigan Athletic in the EFL Trophy and was nominated as League Two Manager of the Month for November 2020.

Following Keith Hill's appointment as permanent manager of Tranmere Rovers, Dawes was installed as his assistant to ensure "consistency and continuity" according to Hill. Dawes was put back in charge of the team after Hill was dismissed on 11 May 2021. He was appointed caretaker manager again in March 2023 following the departure of Micky Mellon.

On 4 May 2023, following Dawes' third spell as caretaker manager, Tranmere Rovers announced his appointment as permanent first team manager, but only lasted until 10 September 2023 after a poor start to the new season.

== Managerial statistics ==
As of 9 September 2023

Managerial record by team and tenure
Team	Nat	From	To	Record								Ref
Team	Nat	From	To	G	W	D	L	GF	GA	GD	Win %	Ref
Floriana	(Malta)	9 May 2013	8 April 2014	31	12	5	14	48	49	−1	38.71	
Bangor City	(Wales)	24 November 2016	29 March 2017	16	8	1	7	29	26	+3	50.00	
Tranmere Rovers (caretaker)	(England)	1 November 2020	22 November 2020	5	4	1	0	14	6	+8	80.00	
Tranmere Rovers (caretaker)	(England)	11 May 2021	30 May 2021	2	0	1	1	2	3	−1	0.00	
Tranmere Rovers	(England)	19 March 2023	10 September 2023	19	3	5	11	19	28	−9	15.79	
Total				73	27	13	33	112	112	+0	36.99	—
