= James McGaul =

English businessman and politician

James Hannay McGaul
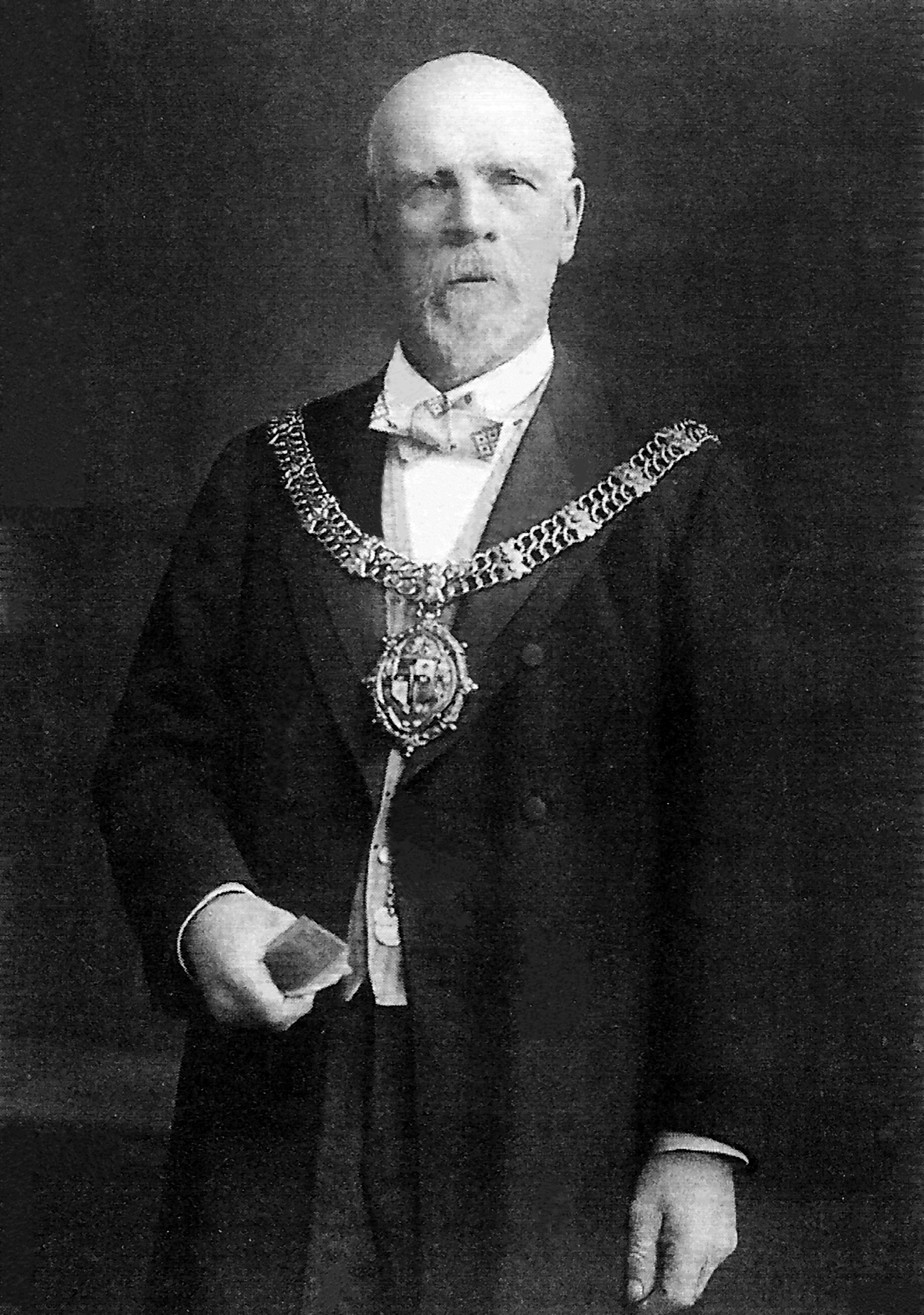
- McGaul pictured as Mayor of Birkenhead in 1908.
- Born: c. 1841; Tranmere, Merseyside, England
- Died: 14 December 1921 (aged 80)

James Hannay McGaul (c. 1841 – 14 December 1921) was an English businessman who was mayor of Birkenhead. He was a building contractor with a business in Liverpool, but devoted his spare time to football and public office. He was president of Tranmere Rovers F.C. from their inception in 1884 until they became a limited company in 1912. He became mayor of Birkenhead in 1908–9 and a justice of the peace.
