= Ronnie Moore =

English football player and manager

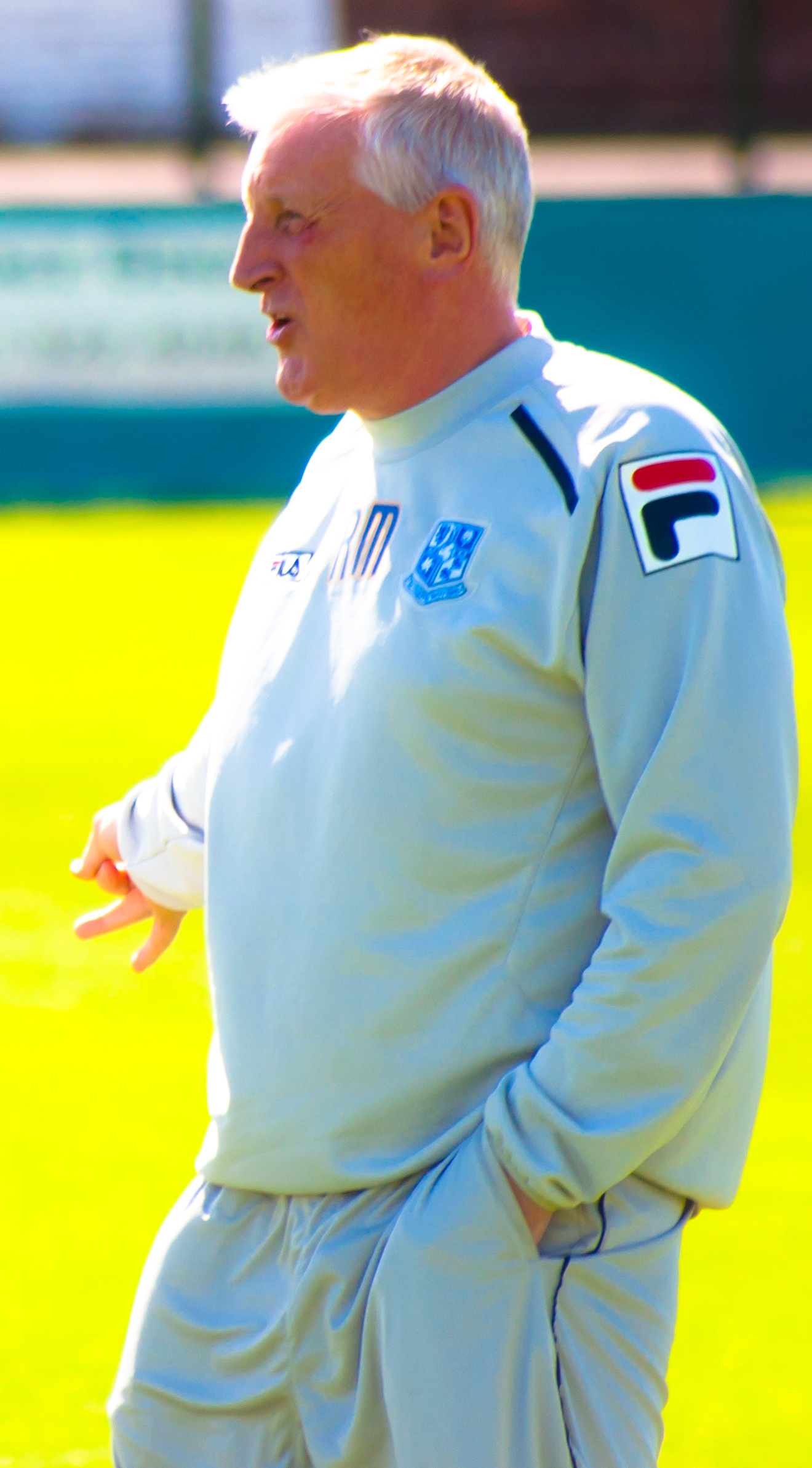
- Moore in 2012

Personal information
- Full name: Ronald David Moore
- Date of birth: 29 January 1953 (age 73)
- Place of birth: Liverpool, England
- Height: 6 ft 0 in (1.83 m)
- Position: Striker

Senior career*
Years	Team	Apps	(Gls)
1971–1979	Tranmere Rovers	249	(72)
1977	→ Chicago Sting (loan)	22	(8)
1979–1980	Cardiff City	56	(6)
1980–1983	Rotherham United	125	(52)
1983–1985	Charlton Athletic	62	(13)
1985–1986	Rochdale	43	(9)
1986–1989	Tranmere Rovers	75	(6)
Total		632	(166)

Managerial career
- 1987–1996: Tranmere Rovers (assistant)
- 1997: Southport
- 1997–2005: Rotherham United
- 2005–2006: Oldham Athletic
- 2006–2009: Tranmere Rovers
- 2009–2011: Rotherham United
- 2012–2014: Tranmere Rovers
- 2014–2016: Hartlepool United
- 2016: Eastleigh
- * Club domestic league appearances and goals

Ronald David Moore (born 29 January 1953) is an English football manager and former player. He has taken charge of several clubs, including Rotherham United, Tranmere Rovers and Hartlepool United. He is currently the chief scout at Hartlepool United.

He played for seven different clubs in a career spanning almost two decades, including Tranmere Rovers, Cardiff City, Charlton Athletic and Rotherham United. He is widely considered to be one of the greatest Rotherham players of all time. Beginning his career in management at Southport in 1997, he went on to manage Rotherham, guiding them to two successive promotions from Division Three to Division One. He moved to Oldham Athletic in 2005, before becoming manager of former club Tranmere Rovers one year later. He returned to Rotherham for a second time in 2009, before returning to Tranmere Rovers for a second time in 2012. In February 2014 he was suspended by the club, pending the outcome of a Football Association investigation into alleged breaches of betting rules; he later admitted breaches of the rules, and was sacked by Tranmere in April 2014. In December 2014, Moore was announced as the new manager of Hartlepool United, but left in 2016.

== Playing career ==
Moore began his playing career at Tranmere Rovers, where he was initially utilized as a defender by player-manager Ron Yeats, who he would often play alongside in defense. He was later turned into a forward by John King. In 1977, because Moore did not want to take the summer break and instead play more football, he was advised by King to play for Bill Foulkes' Chicago Sting team. After a season in the USA, he returned to Tranmere. However, Tranmere were relegated in 1979, and they were forced to sell Moore to relieve their financial problems.

Moore was sold to Cardiff City for £120,000; a club record for Cardiff at the time. He only played for the Welsh team for a year, before joining Third Division Rotherham United. He quickly made an impact, being top scorer when the club got promoted to the Second Division in the 1980-81 season.

After 52 goals in three years for the club, Moore left for Charlton Athletic in 1983, reportedly because of a clash with incoming manager, George Kerr, centred around access to the players' bar. This episode has been described as "a drink problem - no, it’s not what you’re thinking" which "led to his departure to Charlton Athletic." He also then played for Rochdale and returned to Tranmere in 1986, while also being John King's assistant manager. He retired from playing in 1989.

== Managerial career ==
After several years at Rotherham, Moore joined Oldham Athletic in March 2005, helping the club to avoid relegation. In his second season, he led Oldham to a mid-table finish and won the League One Manager of the Month Award for December 2005, but later parted company with Oldham ostensibly due to poor season ticket sales.

=== Tranmere Rovers ===
Moore was immediately offered a position as manager of former club Tranmere Rovers in June 2006, which he accepted. He began his time in charge of Tranmere by bringing in nine players in the close season, including Chris Shuker and Paul McLaren. In his first year, he guided the team finish 9th in League One, although Tranmere had looked likely to achieve a play-off place for most of the year. In his second year in charge, Tranmere could only finish 11th, despite having been top of the table earlier in the season. Moore was affectionately known as "Ronnie Raw" by many Tranmere fans due to his extreme sense of humour.

=== Return to Rotherham United ===
In September 2009, Rotherham United confirmed that Moore would begin a second stint as manager, assisted by former teammate Jimmy Mullen. The following day, Ronnie was unveiled to the Millers faithful at the home game against Barnet, to a standing ovation. Rotherham went on to win the game 3–0. His return spell at Rotherham was mixed; Moore won the League Two Manager of the Month Award for November 2009, and took the club to Wembley for the League Two play-off final, although the Millers lost 3–2 to Dagenham & Redbridge. The 2010–11 season began similarly well, but after a string of indifferent results Moore left the club "by mutual consent" in the wake of a 5–0 defeat to Chesterfield in March, with Rotherham 6th in the table. His failure to secure Rotherham's place in the play-off spots for the second season in succession was largely cited as the reason for his second departure.

=== Return to Tranmere Rovers ===
On 5 March 2012, following the sacking of Les Parry, Moore made a second return to a former club, being appointed Tranmere Rovers manager until the end of the season.

On 14 February 2014, it was reported that Moore was under investigation by The Football Association, for breaching its rules against betting on competitions in which his club were involved. Three days later, the club announced that he had been suspended with immediate effect, until the conclusion of the FA investigation. On 31 March, the FA charged Moore in relation to alleged multiple breaches of rules regarding betting on matches. Moore admitted the charge on 8 April, and requested a personal hearing. He was sacked on 9 April 2014; the club said that "Tranmere Rovers will not tolerate any action that damages the integrity of this football club."

=== Hartlepool United ===
On 16 December 2014, Moore was appointed as Hartlepool United manager. Moore was appointed with the club bottom of the league, six points from safety and with a goal difference of minus-24. Hartlepool were at one stage ten points adrift at the bottom of the Football League and looked certain for relegation, but Moore inspired a revival in form, with the team having a four-match winning streak towards the latter stages of the season, which eventually ensured league survival in the penultimate game at home to Exeter City. This survival was dubbed the "great escape" by supporters which ironically relegated Moore's former club Tranmere Rovers from the Football League.

On 10 February 2016, Moore left Hartlepool by mutual consent with the club four points above the relegation places.

=== Eastleigh ===
In August 2016, Moore joined National League side Eastleigh. In Moore's first ten games with the Spitfires, Eastleigh remained unbeaten. In the FA Cup, Moore oversaw a 3–1 victory away at Swindon Town in a replay to reach the second round. On 30 November 2016, Moore decided to leave Eastleigh citing "personal circumstances over the past few weeks". He left the club eight points away from the play-off positions.

=== Post management ===
In January 2024, Moore was heavily linked with the vacant managerial position at former club Hartlepool United. On 3 April 2024, it was announced that Moore would return to Hartlepool as their chief scout. On returning to the club, Moore said: "It's fantastic to be back at Hartlepool and I'm really looking forward to it. I've never forgotten my time at Pools - I had a few promotions in my career, but that survival feeling was one of the best emotions I've ever felt. The supporters were extraordinary and I'm passionate about this Club. I want to see it back where it belongs. Often as a manager I would scout players myself, but I'm really looking forward to being able to solely focus on recruitment, giving it my full time and attention."

== Personal life ==
His son is Ian Thomas-Moore.

In July 2025, it was revealed that Moore had been diagnosed with myeloma.

== Managerial statistics ==
As of 29 November 2016

Team	From	To	Record				
Team	From	To	G	W	D	L	Win %
Southport	4 January 1997	3 May 1997	31	13	7	11	41.94
Rotherham United	24 May 1997	31 January 2005	398	143	121	134	35.93
Oldham Athletic	1 March 2005	1 June 2006	65	23	18	24	35.38
Tranmere Rovers	9 June 2006	5 June 2009	158	65	38	55	41.14
Rotherham United	26 September 2009	21 March 2011	87	36	21	30	41.38
Tranmere Rovers	4 March 2012	9 April 2014	102	38	23	41	37.25
Hartlepool United	16 December 2014	10 February 2016	59	19	11	29	32.20
Eastleigh	19 August 2016	29 November 2016	21	10	7	4	47.62
Total			922	348	246	328	37.74

== Honours ==
=== Player ===
Tranmere Rovers

- Football League Fourth Division fourth place promotion: 1975–76

Rotherham United

- Football League Third Division: 1980–81

Individual

- PFA Team of the Year: 1975–76 Fourth Division

=== Manager ===
Rotherham United

- Football League Second Division runner-up: 2000–01
- Football League Third Division runner-up: 1999–2000

Individual

- Football League Second Division / Football League One Manager of the Month: October 2000, December 2005, August 2012, September 2012
- Football League Two Manager of the Month: November 2009
