= Noel Kelly (footballer) =

Irish footballer and manager

Noel Kelly (28 December 1921 – August 1991) was an Irish footballer who played as a forward during the 1940s.

== Career ==
Kelly played for Bohemians during the 1940s in the League of Ireland and was a member of the 1945 Bohemian Inter City Cup winning team against Belfast Celtic at Dalymount Park. He moved to Shamrock Rovers for the 1945/46 season and played in the 1946 FAI Cup Final.

He then transferred to Glentoran and then to English side Arsenal in October 1947. Mainly a reserve, he made just the one first-team appearance for Arsenal, against Everton at Goodison Park on 25 February 1950 in a 1–0 win.

He moved to Crystal Palace in March 1950 and signed for Nottingham Forest in August 1951. In July 1955 he moved to Tranmere Rovers to become player-manager, but his tenure was unsuccessful and brief, with Rovers having to apply for re-election to the League in 1957. He left Tranmere in 1957 and did not work in football again, as he ran a sports clothes shop on the Wirral. He died on 28 December 1991.

== International ==
He won his one and only cap for the Republic of Ireland, against Luxembourg in 1954.

== Personal ==
Noel's son John followed in his footsteps by playing for Tranmere Rovers and several other clubs.

== Honours ==
Bohemians

- Inter City Cup: 1945
