= Jim Knowles (football manager) =

English football manager

Personal information
- Full name: Jim Knowles

Managerial career
- Years: Team
- 1936–1939: Tranmere Rovers

Jim Knowles was a football manager. He managed Tranmere Rovers from 1936 to 1939.

== Management career ==
Former film extra Knowles became secretary and manager of Tranmere Rovers in 1936.

Knowles left the club in 1939, at the start of World War II.
