= John McMahon (footballer, born 1964) =

English footballer and coach

Personal information
- Date of birth: 19 May 1964 (age 62)
- Place of birth: Liverpool, England
- Height: 5 ft 6 in (1.68 m)
- Position: Midfielder

Team information
- Current team: Forest Green Rovers (assistant manager)

Youth career
- Everton

Senior career*
Years	Team	Apps	(Gls)
1981–1983	Everton	0	(0)
1983–1985	Southport	27	(5)
1985	South Liverpool		
1985–1986	Altrincham	16	(0)
1986–1987	Witton Albion		
1987–1989	Runcorn	47	(7)
1989–199?	Altrincham	33	(5)
199?–1992	Morecambe		
1992–1993	Macclesfield Town	26	(0)
1993–1994	Knowsley United		
1994–1996	Hyde United	22	(1)

Managerial career
- 2003: Tranmere Rovers (caretaker)
- 2008: Shrewsbury Town (caretaker)
- 2009–2011: Liverpool F.C. Reserves
- 2014: Tranmere Rovers (caretaker)
- 2023: Morecambe (joint caretaker)
- 2025: Forest Green Rovers (assistant manager)
- * Club domestic league appearances and goals

John McMahon (born 19 May 1964) is an English football coach and former player who is assistant manager at National League club Forest Green Rovers.

== Playing career ==
McMahon came through an apprenticeship with Everton and was a regular in their reserves, but never appeared for the first team. He went on to play semi-professional football for Southport, South Liverpool, Altrincham (two spells), Witton Albion, Runcorn, Morecambe, Macclesfield Town, Knowsley United and Hyde United.

== Coaching career ==
McMahon spent eight years on the coaching staff of Tranmere Rovers, where he had two spells as caretaker manager, in the 2003–04 season and at the end of the 2005–06 season.

He moved to become first-team coach at Shrewsbury Town in June 2006, and was made assistant manager in September 2007. During this period he completed his UEFA Pro Licence in coaching during 2006. On 3 March 2008 he was appointed caretaker manager, after the departure of manager Gary Peters. The appointment of Paul Simpson on 12 March saw him resume the assistant role.

On 8 June 2009, McMahon was appointed reserve team coach of Liverpool, replacing Gary Ablett. He took charge of the reserve team for the first time on 18 July 2009, when the a Liverpool XI beat Aberystwyth Town 4–1 in a friendly. On 11 March 2011 it was announced that he would no longer be a coach at Liverpool.

In June 2011 he rejoined the coaching staff at Tranmere as first team coach. McMahon was appointed caretaker manager of Tranmere in February 2014, after the suspension of Ronnie Moore. He left the club in August 2014.

In November 2019, he was appointed assistant manager at Morecambe under Derek Adams. Following Adams' departure in June 2021, McMahon stayed on as assistant to Stephen Robinson, before leaving the role in December.

McMahon was reappointed as Morecambe's assistant manager in February 2022 with the return of Derek Adams to the managerial role. In November 2023, McMahon was appointed caretaker manager of Morecambe alongside Ged Brannan for one game after Adams' departure, before Brannan was given the role permanently.

In 2024, McMahon was released from Morecambe Football Club after being charged by the Football Association with misconduct in relation to alleged multiple breaches of betting regulations.

After a spell at Macclesfield, John McMahon moved with manager Robbie Savage to join Forest Green Rovers, taking the role of assistant manager on 2 July 2025.

== Personal life ==
McMahon is the younger brother of Liverpool and England player Steve McMahon.

Sporting positions
Preceded by Gary Ablett	Liverpool F.C. Reserves Coach; 2009-2011	Succeeded by José Segura
