= Les Parry =

English physiotherapist and football manager

Personal information
- Full name: Leslie Parry
- Date of birth: 27 November 1957 (age 68)
- Place of birth: Birkenhead, England

Managerial career
- Years: Team
- 2009–2012: Tranmere Rovers

Leslie Parry (born 27 November 1957) is an English physiotherapist and former manager of Tranmere Rovers Football Club from 9 October 2009 until his dismissal on 4 March 2012.

Parry worked with Tranmere Rovers as physiotherapist since 1991 before succeeding John Barnes in the managerial position at Tranmere. He kept his former job during his first season as manager. Having only recruited on caretaker basis, he guided the club to five wins and three draws, earning him a permanent contract on 16 December 2009. Later that season, he staved off relegation from the League One.

== Managerial career ==
=== Tranmere Rovers ===
Rovers sacked manager John Barnes and his assistant, Jason McAteer, after a run of just two league wins from 11 matches on 9 October 2009. As a result, Parry was placed in temporary charge, to be assisted by reserve boss Shaun Garnett. His first match was a 0–1 home loss to Stockport County. On 16 December, he was appointed manager until the end of the season after an encouraging five wins and three draws (sixteen losses) as caretaker boss. Parry successfully kept Tranmere in League One, securing the team's place for the next season with a vital victory away at Stockport on the final day of the 2009–10 season. Parry continued to fill the physiotherapist role alongside that of manager until the appointment of Steve Walker in June 2010.

After finishing 18th in the 2010-11 campaign, his first full season in charge, Parry was awarded the Liverpool Echo Special Award for Outstanding Service to Sport. In the same season, Parry completed the amazing feat of attending 1001 consecutive First Team matches a feat made more remarkable by the fact that for more than 900 of those matches when he was physio, he wore nothing more than tee-shirt and shorts, even on the coldest of evenings. The team made a strong start the following season, with Rovers in 5th place at the end of August and Parry was nominated for the NW Manager of the Year award. However, they had a run of 11 matches without a win (on a wider scale 1 win in 20), leading to the physio's dismissal on 4 March 2012.

Parry was appointed as physiotherapist at Accrington Stanley until the end of the 2011–12 season and stayed there until joining Manchester United on 1 January 2013 to work with the development and academy squads in Athletic Development. In October 2014, Parry was awarded the prestigious Fabrice Muamba Award for Medical and Science Professional of the Year.

== Statistics ==
=== Managerial ===
These statistics include all league and cup first team fixtures.

As of 3 March 2012

Team	From	To	Record				
Team	From	To	G	W	D	L	Win %
Tranmere Rovers	9 October 2009	4 March 2012	131	40	34	57	30.53
Total			131	40	34	57	30.53

== Personal life ==
Parry began his working life as a trainee shipwright at Cammell Laird in Birkenhead. During this period of his life he was named 'British Apprentice of the Year' in 1974. He followed this with a career as an airframe fitter at British Aerospace. After a period working in Germany he returned to the UK where he studied physiotherapy at the University of Salford. In addition, he also acquired a qualification in sports science. Following this he opened a clinic, and a business to train health and fitness instructors.

He started as part-time physio at Tranmere in 1991 before being appointed full-time by Johnny King in 1993.

Parry completed a PhD in "Sports injuries in professional soccer and the effects of detraining" at Liverpool John Moores University in July 2010.

Parry released a single named "I'm Les The White Legs Parry" which changed words from "Rudolph the Red-Nosed Reindeer" in 2006. It sold 2,000 copies to raise money for charity.
