= Ernest Blackburn =

English footballer and manager

Personal information
- Full name: Robert Ernest Blackburn
- Date of birth: 23 April 1893
- Place of birth: Crawshawbooth, England
- Date of death: 13 July 1964 (aged 71)
- Place of death: Birkenhead, England
- Height: 5 ft 9 in (1.75 m)
- Position: Full back

Youth career
- Loveclough
- Manchester Youth Club
- The Army

Senior career*
Years	Team	Apps	(Gls)
1919–1922	Aston Villa	32	(0)
1922–1924	Bradford City	40	(0)
Total		72	(0)

Managerial career
- 1932–1936: Wrexham
- 1937–1946: Hull City
- 1946–1955: Tranmere Rovers
- * Club domestic league appearances and goals

Robert Ernest Blackburn (23 April 1893 – 13 July 1964) was an English football player and manager.

== Career ==
=== Playing career ===
Born in Crawshawbooth on the edge of the Pennines in England, Blackburn played as a full back for Loveclough, Manchester Youth Club, The Army, Aston Villa and Bradford City. For Aston Villa, he made 32 appearances in the Football League; he also made 1 FA Cup appearance. For Bradford City, he made 40 appearances in the Football League; he also made 2 FA Cup appearances.

=== Management career ===
After retiring as a player, Blackburn became a trainer at Accrington Stanley in May 1924. He later managed Wrexham, Hull City and Tranmere Rovers.

== Sources ==
- Frost, Terry (1988). Bradford City A Complete Record 1903-1988. Breedon Books Sport. ISBN 0-907969-38-0.
