= Mike Jackson (footballer, born 1973) =

English footballer and manager

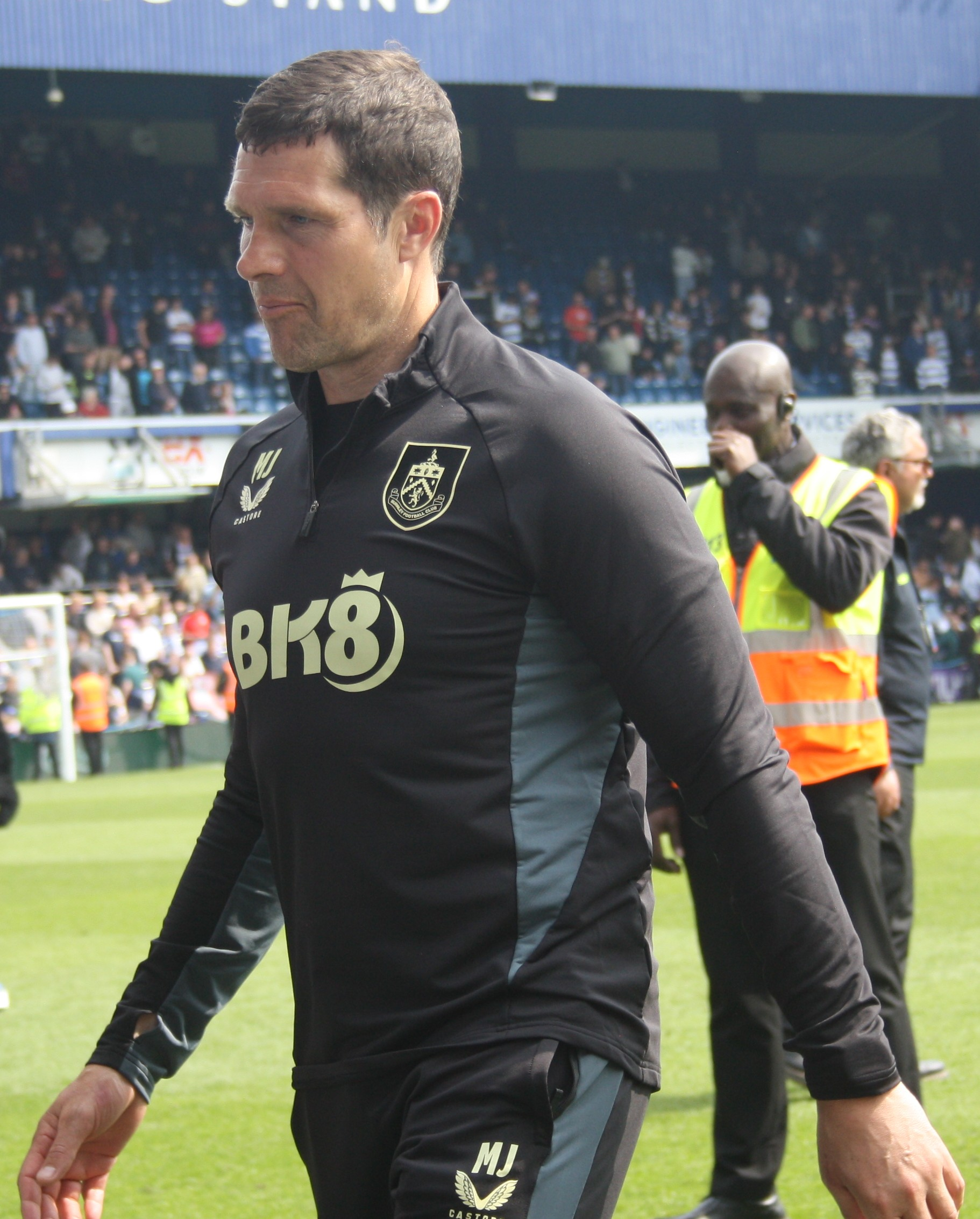
- Jackson with Burnley in 2025

Personal information
- Full name: Michael James Jackson
- Date of birth: 4 December 1973 (age 52)
- Place of birth: Runcorn, England
- Position: Defender

Team information
- Current team: Burnley F.C. (assistant coach)

Senior career*
Years	Team	Apps	(Gls)
1992–1993	Crewe Alexandra	5	(0)
1993–1997	Bury	125	(9)
1997–2004	Preston North End	245	(17)
2002–2003	→ Tranmere Rovers (loan)	6	(0)
2004–2006	Tranmere Rovers	84	(8)
2006–2008	Blackpool	68	(1)
2008–2010	Shrewsbury Town	21	(2)
Total		554	(37)

Managerial career
- 2010: Shrewsbury Town (caretaker)
- 2014: Shrewsbury Town
- 2020: Tranmere Rovers
- 2022: Burnley (interim)
- 2026: Burnley (interim)
- * Club domestic league appearances and goals

Michael James Jackson (born 4 December 1973) is an English football manager and former professional footballer. He is currently assistant head coach for EFL Championship club Burnley.

As a player, Jackson was a defender who played in the Football League for Crewe Alexandra, Bury, Preston North End, Tranmere Rovers, Blackpool and Shrewsbury Town. He moved into management in 2014 and has been in charge of both Tranmere Rovers and Shrewsbury Town.

== Playing career ==
Jackson started his career as a trainee at Crewe Alexandra in 1992. He signed for Bury in August 1993 on a free transfer where he stayed until 1997 making 125 league appearances and scoring nine goals. In March 1997 he signed for Preston North End for a fee of £125,000. In seven years at the club, he made 251 league appearances and scored 17 goals. While at Preston, he had a one-month loan spell at Tranmere Rovers from December 2002 to January 2003, having been frozen out of the team at Deepdale by manager Craig Brown. In May 2004, he signed for Tranmere on a free transfer, making 84 appearances in two years at the club.

In June 2006, Jackson joined Blackpool on a free transfer. He scored his first goal for Blackpool on 19 August 2006 in a 4–2 league win at Bristol City. He became an instrumental part of the Blackpool team and captained the side in their promotion to the English Championship in May 2007. Jackson picked up an injury in February 2008 which kept him out for two months before he made a late-season comeback. On 7 May 2008, however, he was released by Blackpool. After his goal against Bristol City, he scored further goals against Norwich City in the FA Cup and Southend United in the League Cup.

On 23 June 2008, it was reported that Jackson was about to sign a two-year contract with Shrewsbury Town. The transfer was completed the following day, along with the club record transfer for Grant Holt. Jackson was a regular in the Shrewsbury side, notably scoring in a 7–0 win over Gillingham, but did not play again after a 3–1 defeat away at Luton Town on 21 February 2009.

It was announced on 13 January 2010 that Jackson had retired from playing due to a persistent knee injury, as a specialist advised him not to risk his long-term health by continuing, but he was to remain at the club until the end of the 2009–10 season in a coaching capacity.

== Coaching and managerial career ==
Jackson continued in his coaching role at Shrewsbury, and was named as caretaker manager for the final match of the 2009–10 season following the dismissal of Paul Simpson. He resumed his coaching role under new manager Graham Turner, and was appointed as caretaker manager again following Turner's resignation on 22 January 2014. A month later, he was given the managerial position on a contract running until the end of the 2013–14 season, but was unable to save the team from relegation to League Two. Despite this, the club opted to retain his services as assistant to new manager Micky Mellon, alongside goalkeeping coach Danny Coyne.

After a sequence of only two wins in the opening eleven matches of the 2016–17 season, Jackson left the club by mutual consent in October 2016 along with Mellon, before once again being appointed as his assistant again at Tranmere shortly afterwards.

Following Mellon's departure to Dundee United, Jackson was named manager of Tranmere Rovers on 18 July 2020. He was sacked on 31 October 2020.

In July 2021, Jackson was appointed interim manager of the Burnley Under-23s team. On 15 April 2022, after Sean Dyche was dismissed, Burnley appointed Jackson as caretaker manager for their away match against West Ham United, which they drew 1–1 two days later. After a 2–1 win away at Watford on 30 April 2022, Jackson became the first Burnley manager to win three of his first four league games in charge since Jimmy Mullen in October 1991. He won the Premier League Manager of the Month award for April after leading relegation-threatened Burnley to three wins and one draw. However, the team were relegated to the Championship at the end of the 2021–22 season after suffering three losses in their last four matches. On 30 April 2026, following the departure of previous manager Scott Parker, Jackson was appointed interim head coach of Burnley until the end of the season.

== Managerial statistics ==
As of match played 24 May 2026

Managerial record by team and tenure
Team	From	To	Record				
Team	From	To	P	W	D	L	Win %
Shrewsbury Town (caretaker)	8 May 2010	8 May 2010	1	0	1	0	0.0
Shrewsbury Town	21 February 2014	3 May 2014	19	3	7	9	15.8
Tranmere Rovers	18 July 2020	31 October 2020	13	3	5	5	23.1
Burnley (interim)	15 April 2022	22 May 2022	8	3	2	3	37.5
Burnley (interim)	30 April 2026	24 May 2026	4	0	2	2	0.0
Total			45	9	17	19	20.0

== Honours ==
Bury

- Football League Second Division: 1996–97

Preston North End

- Football League Second Division: 1999–2000

Blackpool

- Football League One play-offs: 2007

Individual

- PFA Team of the Year: 1999–2000 Second Division
- Premier League Manager of the Month: April 2022
