= Tranmere Rovers F.C. =

Association football club based in Birkenhead, England

Tranmere Rovers
- Full name: Tranmere Rovers Football Club
- Nickname: The Rovers
- Short name: Rovers; Super White Army
- Founded: 1884; 142 years ago (as Belmont FC)
- Ground: Prenton Park
- Capacity: 16,567
- Owner: Mark & Nicola Palios
- Chairman: Mark Palios
- Manager: Darrell Clarke
- League: EFL League Two
- 2025–26: EFL League Two, 21st of 24
- Website: www.tranmererovers.co.uk
Home colours	Away colours	Third colours

Tranmere Rovers Football Club are a professional association football club based in Birkenhead, Merseyside, England. The team competes in EFL League Two, the fourth level of the English football league system.

Founded in 1884 as Belmont Football Club, they adopted their current name in 1885. Tranmere's regular kit is an all-white strip with blue, or occasionally blue and green trim which have been their main colours since 1962. The club moved to its current home, Prenton Park, in 1912. In 1995, the ground had a major redevelopment in response to the Taylor Report. It now seats 16,567 in four stands: the Main Stand, the Kop, the Johnny King Stand and the Cowshed.

Tranmere played in regional leagues until they were invited to become a founder member of Football League Third Division North in 1921. They finished as champions for the 1937–38 season, though were relegated out of the Second Division the following year. They dropped into the Fourth Division in 1961, before winning promotion back to the third tier at the end of the 1966–67 season. Relegation in 1975 was followed by an immediate promotion in 1975–76 under the stewardship of manager John King, and this time they survived for just three seasons in the third tier until being relegated once again in 1979. During the 1980s, they were beset by financial problems and, in 1987, went into administration. However John King returned to manage the club for a second spell and guided Rovers to promotion in 1988–89, which they followed up by winning the Associate Members' Cup in 1990 and then promotion out of the play-offs in 1991.

The 1990s would prove to be the most successful period in the club's history as Tranmere remained in the second tier, and came close to reaching the Premier League with three consecutive play-off campaigns at the start of the decade. Under King's successor, John Aldridge, Tranmere experienced a number of cup runs, most notably reaching the 2000 League Cup final. They were finally relegated in 2001 and then spent 13 seasons in the third tier, before back-to-back relegations saw them drop out of the Football League after a 94-year stay. Tranmere spent three seasons in the National League and then returned to the third tier of the Football League via successive play-off campaigns in 2018 and 2019. They were demoted from League One in 2020 after clubs voted to end the season early due to the COVID-19 pandemic.

== History ==
=== Formative years ===
1889–1904 kit

Tranmere Rovers were, initially, formed as Belmont Football Club when the football arms of two cricket clubs – Lyndhurst Wanderers and Belmont – came together in 1884. On 15 November 1884, they won their first game 4–0 against Brunswick Rovers. This was a friendly match, as there were no leagues until 1888. With James McGaul as their president, the team completed their inaugural season, losing only one of their fifteen matches. An unrelated, disbanded side had played under the name "Tranmere Rovers Cricket Club (Association football section)" in 1881–82. On 16 September 1885, before their second season began, Belmont F.C. adopted this name Tranmere Rovers. Tranmere was historically a large township that was subsumed within the later expansion of the town of Birkenhead.

Tranmere played their first matches at Steeles Field in Birkenhead. In 1887, they bought Ravenshaws Field from Tranmere Rugby Club. In 1895, their ground was renamed Prenton Park, although it was 25 years later that the team moved into the current stadium of the same name. Tranmere first wore a kit of blue shirts, white shorts and blue socks. In 1889 they adopted orange and maroon shirts, but in 1904 returned to wearing their original kit.

In 1886, Tranmere entered their first competition: the Liverpool and District Challenge Cup; in 1889, they entered the West Lancashire League. They joined the Combination, a much stronger league, in 1897, and won the championship in 1908. In 1910, continuing their movement through the leagues, they entered the Lancashire Combination and in 1912 moved to the present Prenton Park site, with an 800-seat stand. Tranmere won the Lancashire Combination Championship in 1914, and Stan Rowlands became the first Tranmere player to receive an international cap when he was selected to play for Wales.

Rovers continued to play throughout the First World War, although their players were criticised for avoiding military service, despite being employed in the local shipyards.

=== Inter-war years ===
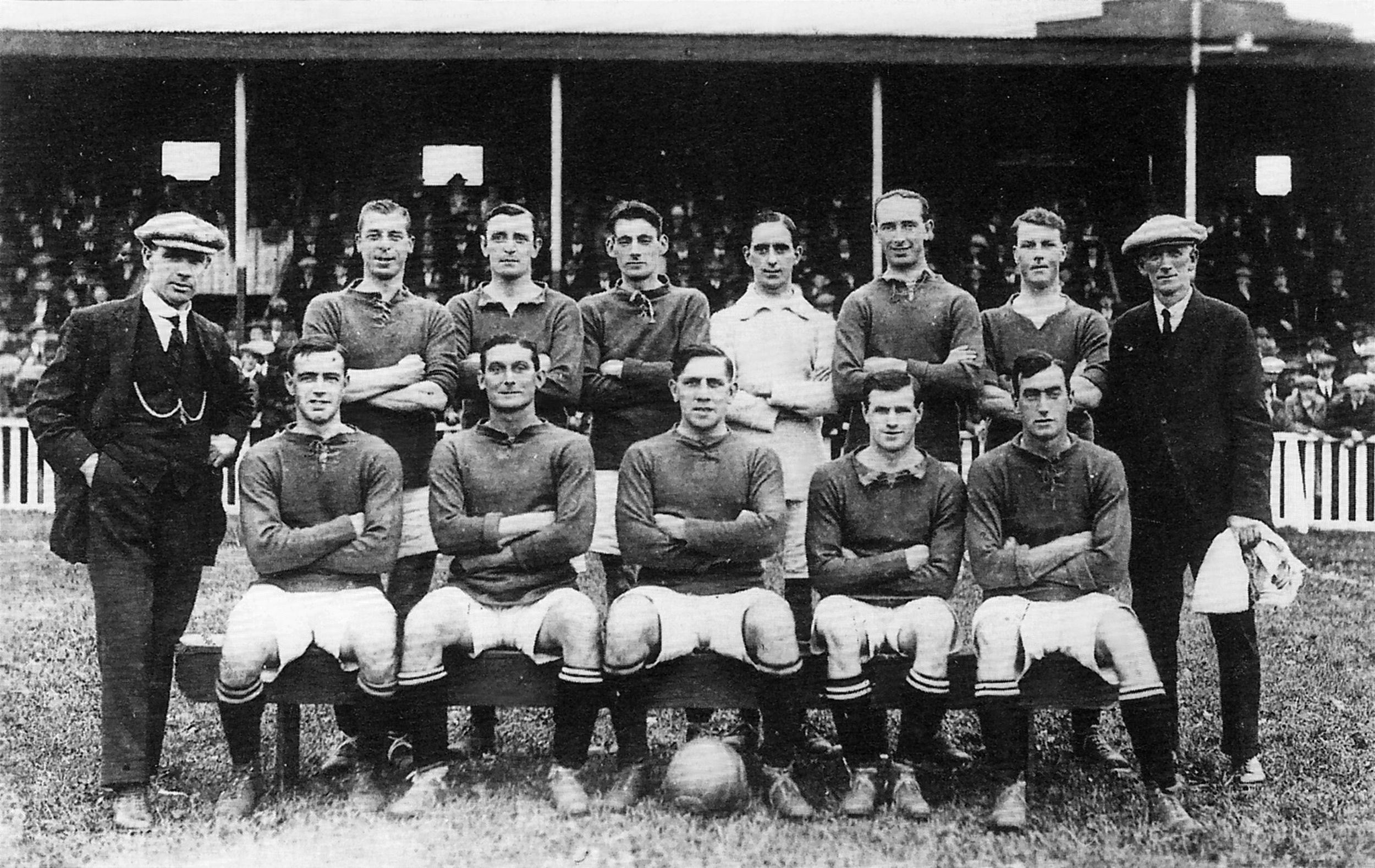
First Football League match in 1921

1921–37 kit

Following the expulsion of Leeds City Reserves in 1919, Tranmere were able to enter the Central League. Their timing was excellent as the following season, four Central League clubs – including Tranmere – were invited to join the new Division Three North. On 27 August 1921, they won their first Football League match 4–1 against Crewe Alexandra at Prenton Park. At this time the team were managed by Bert Cooke, who did so for 23 years in total, the club record for longest serving manager.

In 1924, local boy Dixie Dean made his debut aged 16 years 355 days. He played 30 games for Rovers, scoring 27 goals, before being transferred to Everton for £3,000. In the 1927–28 season, Dean scored a record 60 League goals for Everton. After Dean's departure, several talented young players also left for Division One clubs, leading to Cooke's reputation as a shrewd businessman. Among those sold was Pongo Waring who – having scored six goals in the 11–1 victory over Durham City – went to Aston Villa for £4,700. As of 2010, Waring retains the record of scoring most goals for Villa in a single season.

In 1934, an FA Cup tie between Rovers and Liverpool was watched at Anfield by 61,036 fans, a then-record crowd for Tranmere. A year later, Bunny Bell netted 40 goals during the 1935–36 season, including nine goals in the 13–4 Boxing Day 1935 victory over Oldham Athletic. As of 2011, the aggregate of 17 goals in one game remained a league record.

During this same period, Tranmere made several appearances in the Welsh Cup, reaching the final on two occasions. In 1934, they lost 3–0 to Bristol City in a replay, after a 1–1 draw. The following season, they went one better by beating local rivals Chester 1–0.

Rovers won their first championship in the Football League in 1938, with victory in Division Three North, earning promotion to Division Two for the first time. As of 2025, this remains Rovers's only championship in the Football League. However, they were relegated the next season, winning only six matches – the record for the worst performance of any team in Division Two.

=== Creation of the Superwhites ===
1962–63 kit

While the Borough Road stand received some damage, Prenton Park emerged from the Second World War largely unscathed. Tranmere rejoined the peacetime Football League in Division Three North, and stayed there until the 1958 restructuring of the football league's lower divisions. Manager Peter Farrell led Tranmere to finish 11th in the final season of the Northern Section, securing a place in the new national Division Three, where they were, again, founder members. The final match against Wrexham, also fighting for a place in the higher league, attracted a crowd of 19,615, which, as of 2010, remained the highest ever attendance at a Prenton Park league match.

In 1961, Tranmere's inspirational captain Harold Bell left the club. Bell had been picked in the first game after the Second World War in the 1946 season, and did not miss a match until he was dropped on 30 August 1955, a total of 459 consecutive appearances for a British team, a record he still holds. Rovers certainly missed their captain, and were relegated to Division Four for the first time in 1961.

Chart of yearly table positions of Tranmere Rovers in the Football League.

The club brought in Dave Russell as manager, and Russell made some changes. Tranmere had worn a kit of blue shirts, white shorts and blue socks since 1904 – the same colours as local rivals, Division One club Everton. Russell introduced an all-white strip to set the teams apart, and white has remained the primary colour on Tranmere's shirts ever since. Russell also developed a successful youth policy, with future England international Roy McFarland among its graduates. Russell guided Rovers back to Division Three in 1967, a year before a new 4,000-seater main stand was opened, and Rovers reached the fifth round of the FA Cup for the first time. Three years later the club's record attendance at Prenton Park was established, with 24,424 supporters watching the Rovers draw 2–2 with Stoke City in the FA Cup.

In 1972, Ron Yeats was installed as player-manager. He strengthened Tranmere's connections with local rivals Liverpool by recruiting several former teammates such as Ian St John, and bringing in Bill Shankly in a consultancy role. This team saw one of the most memorable Rovers results of all time when, in a League Cup tie in 1973, Tranmere beat First Division Arsenal 1–0 at their former Highbury home. However, Tranmere returned to the Fourth Division in 1975. The following decade was among the bleakest times in the club's history, with the team usually in the lower reaches of the Fourth Division, beset by financial problems, and attaining crowds of less than 2,000.

In 1979, Steve Mungall joined Tranmere from Motherwell. He went on to make more than 600 appearances for Rovers over a 17-year period. This spell saw Rovers rise up the league and make several appearances at Wembley. He remained with the club, on the coaching staff, until October 2000, when he left to pursue business interests.

1981–82 kit

Another relegation to Division Four in 1979 put the club in financial difficulties. Debts mounted throughout the 1980s, with insolvency forestalled through a series of friendly fixtures, contributions from fans and a £200,000 loan from Wirral Council. The partnership with Wirral Council proved an enduring one, with their logo appearing on the shirts until 2013. In July 1984, the club was sold to a Californian attorney, making Tranmere one of the first English clubs to be bought by a foreign owner. However, in 1987, the club become the first English football team to enter administration.

=== Johnny King era ===
Local businessman Peter Johnson took over the club. This proved to be a turning point in Tranmere's history, the club under his ownership experiencing by far the most successful period in its history, in which manager John King took the team from the bottom of Division Four to the brink of English football's top league. King's first task was to avoid the team finishing bottom of Division Four, which would have resulted in their relegation from the football league. Safety was guaranteed in the last game of the season, with a 1–0 home win over Exeter City on the last day of the season.

The first full season (1987–88) of King's second managerial spell in charge saw Tranmere make their first appearance at Wembley Stadium, when a good mid-season run of form saw them qualify for the Football League Centenary Tournament. Tranmere defeated Division One clubs Wimbledon and Newcastle United, before losing on penalties to eventual winner Nottingham Forest. The following season, King guided Tranmere to promotion as Division Four runner-up. Their final game played to secure promotion was against Crewe Alexandra, with both teams needing a point to gain promotion. The first half was contested as usual, but, in the second half, with the score at 1–1, neither team targeted the goal of the other, leading to combined celebrations when the game had concluded. Earlier that season, they had won several games in the League Cup, including against Division One Middlesbrough, in between wins against fellow Division Four club Stockport County and Division 3 club Blackpool, ultimately losing to Bristol City of Division 3.

At the end their first season in Division Three, Tranmere almost secured promotion to Division 2, losing 2–0 in the play-off final to Notts County, a week after a 2–1 victory over Bristol Rovers at Wembley Stadium in the final of the Leyland DAF Trophy had secured the club's first major trophy. The form of striker Ian Muir was key to Tranmere's success during this period. He joined the club in 1985, and scored 180 goals in eleven seasons. He became the club's record scorer, and, in 2012, the first inductee to their hall of fame. Fellow hall of fame member John Morrissey joined the club in 1985. The winger spent 14 seasons at the club, making 585 appearances.

1999–2000 kit

In the 1990–91 season, Tranmere won promotion to Division Two for the first time since the 1930s, with a 1–0 play-off win over local rivals Bolton Wanderers. Once again, Rovers made an appearance in the Leyland DAF Trophy final, this time losing 3–2 to Birmingham City. This made the play-off victory over Bolton Wanderers Tranmere's fourth appearance in a Wembley Stadium final in just over a year.

In summer 1991, former Liverpool player John Aldridge joined Tranmere Rovers, signing from Spanish club Real Sociedad for a fee of £250,000; he would remain on the club's payroll for the next 10 years, scoring 170 times to put him behind only Ian Muir in the all-time scoring charts. Aldridge also received 30 caps for the Republic of Ireland, and was the first Tranmere player to score at a World Cup. In 1992, Scotland international Pat Nevin joined the team, forming a four-man attack alongside Aldridge, Chris Malkin and Morrissey. In three successive seasons, Tranmere reached the play-off semi-finals, missing out on promotion to the newly formed Premier League through defeat to Swindon Town in 1993, Leicester City in 1994, and Reading in 1995. 1994 also saw Tranmere progress to the League Cup semi-final, where they faced Aston Villa over two legs. The home leg was won 3–1 by Tranmere, with Villa scoring their only goal in the 94th minute. The score in the away leg was 2–1 in favour of Villa until the 88th minute when Villa scored again to win the game 3–1, so the match went to extra-time and penalties. With Tranmere one kick away from the final, Mark Bosnich saved Liam O'Brien's sudden death penalty, and Tranmere eventually lost 5–4.

A reconstructed Prenton Park was opened in March 1995, with the all-seater stadium then holding just under 17,000 supporters. In April 1996, with Rovers struggling for form in the league, chairman Frank Corfe appointed John Aldridge as player-manager, and King was "moved upstairs" to become Director of football. They finished the 1995–96 campaign in 13th position.

=== 2000 and beyond ===
2011–2012 kit

In the 1999–2000 season, victories over Premiership sides including West Ham United and Sunderland, and First Division club Fulham led, not only to a place in the sixth round of the FA Cup, but also a place in the 2000 Football League Cup final against Leicester City – the first time in the club's history that Rovers had reached the final of one of England's two most important trophies. Matt Elliott scored Leicester's opening goal, before Tranmere's Clint Hill was sent off for a second bookable offence. Despite being reduced to ten men, David Kelly equalised; however, Elliot scored Leicester's second goal three minutes later, and Tranmere lost the match 2–1. This was the last League Cup game held at the original Wembley stadium.

In 2000, Tranmere Rovers had another cup competition run, beating local Premier League rival Everton 3–0 at Goodison Park, then Southampton 4–3 (after being 0–3 down), before exiting after a loss to another local rival, Premier League club Liverpool. However, despite their cup success, Rovers struggled in the league. Aldridge quit as manager before Tranmere's relegation to Division Two, which ended a spell of ten years in Division One.

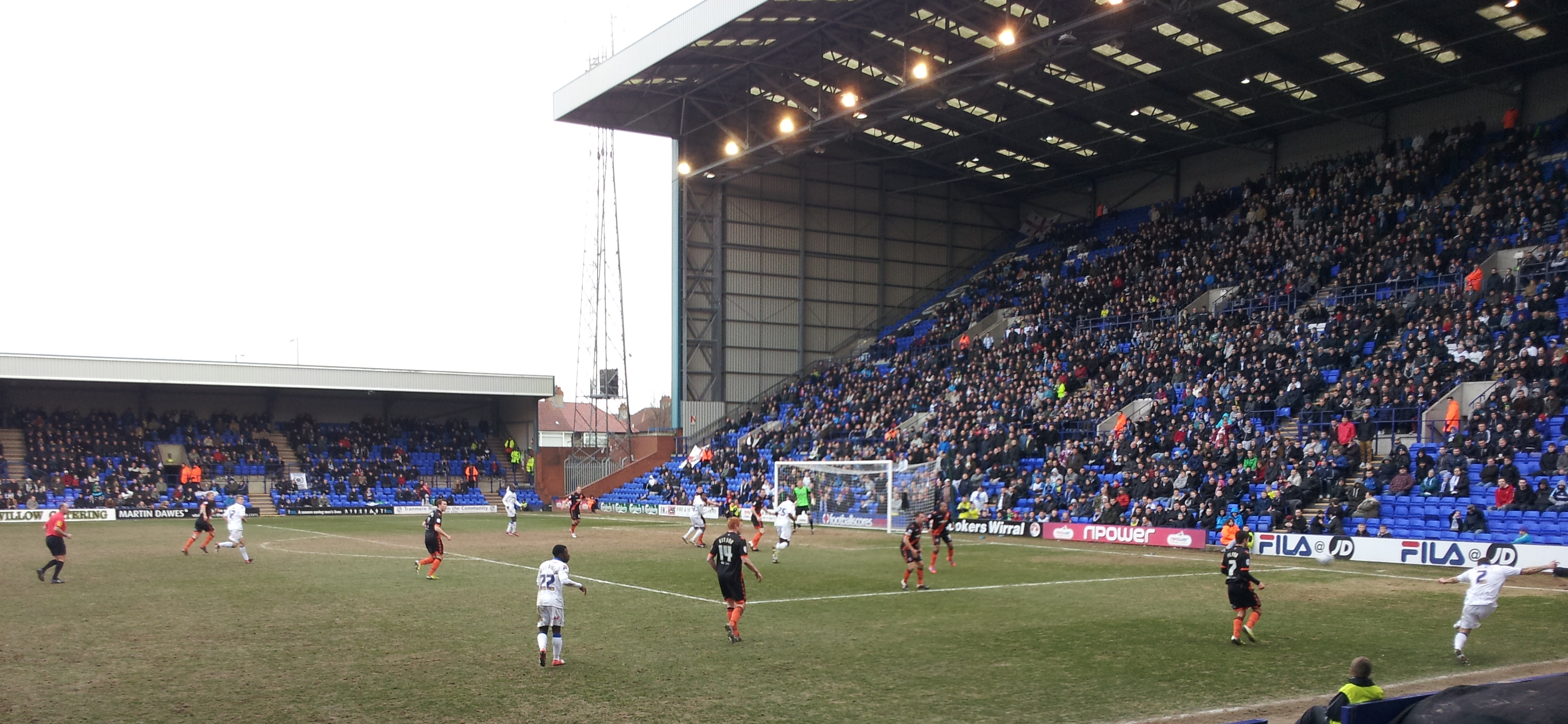
Tranmere Rovers v Sheffield United in the 2012–13 season

The club hired Brian Little as manager in 2003. He took Rovers to a play-off semi-final in 2004–05, and equaled their greatest ever FA Cup performance, losing to eventual finalists Millwall in a sixth round replay. At the end of the 2005–06 season, Little left the club and was replaced by former player Ronnie Moore. In Moore's three seasons in charge, the club finished 9th, 11th and 7th, narrowly missing out on qualification for in the play-offs in his final season. Moore was sacked in 2009, with former England winger John Barnes, whose only previous domestic managerial experience was with Celtic 10 years earlier, replacing him. It was during Barnes's time as manager that long-serving kitman, Mark Trevor, ended his 12-year "Labour of Love", washing the kit of his local team. Having been at the club since 1997, he washed his last kit in August 2009, ahead of the club's home game against Charlton Athletic. Barnes's term as manager lasted considerably less time, and it was a five months before long-serving club physiotherapist Les Parry was given temporary charge. Rovers finished the season in 19th place in League One, avoiding relegation on the final day of the season, thanks to a 3–0 victory at Stockport County. In June 2010, Parry was given the manager's job on a permanent basis. He was sacked on 4 March 2012, after a 1–0 defeat by Chesterfield left the club only one point above the relegation zone, and replaced by Ronnie Moore for the remainder of the season. Moore won six of his thirteen games in charge at the end of the season, guiding Tranmere to a mid-table position, as they finished the season in the top half for the first time since his initial departure. In April 2012, Moore signed a new one-year deal with Tranmere, keeping him at the club until the end of the 2012–13 season.

Towards the end of the 2013–14 season, Moore admitted breaking the Football Association's betting rules, and Tranmere sacked him when the club were just clear of the relegation zone. Assistant John McMahon took over as caretaker manager, but Tranmere were relegated to League Two in the final game of the season on the final day of the season. Rob Edwards was subsequently appointed as new manager.

On 11 August 2014, it was announced that former player and Football Association chief executive Mark Palios and his wife Nicola were taking a controlling interest in the club from outgoing chairman Peter Johnson. Mark Palios would become executive chairman of the club, with Johnson becoming its honorary president.

After a poor start to the season, a home loss to Plymouth Argyle on 11 October 2014 saw Tranmere in last place in the Football League. Edwards was sacked as manager on 13 October. Mickey Adams took over a week later, with the aim of saving the club from relegation to the Conference. However, on 25 April 2015, after another defeat to Plymouth Argyle in the reverse fixture, Tranmere were relegated, ending their 94-year stay in the Football League.

=== Non-League years ===
Gary Brabin was appointed as manager on 5 May 2015. It was a season of ups and downs, with poorer home form than away form. It took a while for Rovers to adjust to life in the non-league, with erratic form during the season. Tranmere finished sixth, one place outside the play-off zone, in Gary Brabin's first season.

Tranmere started the 2016–17 season well, sitting at the top of the non-league table at the end of August, after which Brabin received an award for manager of the month. Form later dipped, with the club scoring only one goal scored in the next four games. Following a 1–0 defeat to Sutton United, Brabin left his role as manager on 18 September 2016. Assistant manager, ex-Southport boss Paul Carden took over on an interim basis. On 6 October 2016, former Tranmere player Micky Mellon was appointed permanent manager. His first game in charge was against cross-border rivals Wrexham, and ended with a 2–0 victory for Tranmere. Despite a 2nd-place finish and a 95-point haul, this still was not enough to gain automatic promotion back to the league. Tranmere faced Aldershot Town in the play-offs. A goal from James Norwood and a brace from Cole Stockton in the first leg away at the Recreation Ground saw Rovers take a 3–0 lead back to Prenton Park for the second leg, which ended in a 2–2 draw, Norwood and Stockton once again on the scoresheet. This gave Tranmere a 5–2 aggregate win and their first Wembley appearance in 17 years. However, they were beaten 3–1 in the 2017 National League play-off final by Forest Green Rovers.

Tranmere's 2017–18 season got off to a poor start, with 3 wins from the first 12 games. Tranmere slipped to 18th in the table, their lowest ever league position. A spectacular winter turnaround saw Tranmere move into the play-off spots, where they remained for the rest of the season. This turnaround included a record-breaking run of 9 consecutive home league wins, which was ended in February with a 4–1 defeat to eventual title winner Macclesfield Town. Tranmere responded to this defeat by winning 8 out of their next 9 games, finishing the season as National League runners-up for the second time in as many years, qualifying for the play-offs. In the play-off semi-final, Tranmere met Ebbsfleet United at home. Tranmere came from behind twice to take the game to extra time before prevailing 4–2 after extra time, a result which sent Tranmere to Wembley Stadium for the National League play-off final. On 12 May 2018, a crowd of 16,306 were at Wembley for the final against Boreham Wood. Tranmere were 2–1 victors, their first trophy in 27 years, and were promoted back to the Football League.

=== Return to the Football League ===
Under the chairmanship of Mark Palios and the management of Micky Mellon, Tranmere played in League Two for the 2018–19 season, finishing 6th and thereby reaching the play-offs. On 25 May 2019, Tranmere secured back-to-back promotions, beating Newport County 1–0 at Wembley Stadium. They did so with a goal from Connor Jennings in the 119th minute, thus securing their spot in League One for the 2019–20 season.

By March 2020, the team were within the relegation zone, but with a game in hand on their nearest rivals and on a run of three successive victories. The cancellation of fixtures due to the COVID-19 pandemic meant that the season could not be completed, and a vote was taken by League One clubs on 9 June to resolve promotion and relegation issues on a points per game (PPG) basis. This meant that Tranmere would be demoted to League Two for the 2020–21 season. Club chairman Mark Palios said that the decision was unfair and that he was considering legal action as a result. He also announced that 20 members of staff would have to be made redundant.

With the team back in League Two, Mike Jackson was named as manager of Tranmere on 18 July 2020. He was sacked on 31 October 2020. Keith Hill succeeded temporary manager Ian Dawes on 21 November 2020. He was sacked on 11 May 2021, after the side reached the play-offs, but before the play-off matches had started. Morecambe defeated Tranmere in the play-off semi-final. At the end of May 2021, Tranmere announced that Micky Mellon was returning to the club as manager, having spent the season apart in charge of Dundee United. Despite a strong start to the season, Tranmere sacked Mellon on 19 March 2023, following results that included a total of six wins since mid-October 2022. Dawes oversaw seven games as caretaker manager before being appointed the permanent manager, but Tranmere sacked him in early September 2023 after six consecutive defeats; Tranmere appointed their technical director Nigel Adkins as interim manager. Adkins was appointed permanent manager on 2 November 2023, signing a contract until the end of 2025–26 season. On 26 February 2025, Adkins left Tranmere by mutual agreement following a ten-game winless run in the league which culminated in a home defeat to Accrington Stanley which left Tranmere two points above the relegation zone. He was replaced by assistant manager Andy Crosby until the end of the season.

== Colours and crest ==
1962 crest

Belmont F.C., the forerunners of today's Rovers, wore blue shirts and white shorts, as did the early Rovers, until a radical change in 1889, when a combination of maroon and orange shirts and navy blue shorts was introduced to "dazzle" their opponents in the West Lancashire League. These were abandoned in 1904 in favour of the earlier blue and white colours which have, in some form or other, remained until the present day. In 1962, Dave Russell introduced a white strip with blue trim, saying "Tranmere Rovers should have a specific identity of its own, so on Merseyside there's now Liverpool's red, Everton's blue and Tranmere's white". Since then, the team have worn varying combinations of blue and white, moving back towards a more predominantly white kit in 2000. The team's colours are reflected in their nickname of the "Superwhites".

Tranmere first introduced a badge on their shirt in 1962, wearing the coat of arms of the borough of Birkenhead, along with adopting their motto "Ubi fides ibi lux et robur", meaning "Where there is faith there is light and strength". The crest was replaced in 1972 by a monogram, and, in 1981, by a simplified blue and white shield. In 1987, a complex heraldic crest was introduced, adapting the Birkenhead crest through the inclusion of a football and a TRFC logo. The simpler badge was adopted in 1997, and modified slightly in 2009 to mark the club's 125-year anniversary. The blue and white crest incorporated simplified elements of the Birkenhead civic coat of arms: the crosier and lion originally formed part of the Birkenhead Priory seal; the oak tree was a symbol of the Tranmere Local Board; the star or starfish represents Bebington; the two lions represent Oxton; and the crescents may represent the Laird family.

For the 2021–22 season, Tranmere reverted to their pre-1997 badge.

== Stadium ==
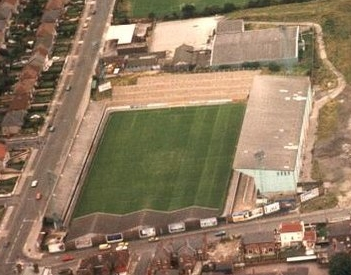
Prenton Park in 1986

Rovers played their first matches at Steeles Field in Birkenhead but, in 1887, they bought a new site from Tranmere Rugby Club. The ground was variously referred to as the "Borough Road Enclosure", "Ravenshaw's Field" and "South Road". The name "Prenton Park" was adopted in 1895 as a result of a suggestion in the letters page of the Football Echo. Because the land was required for housing and a school, Tranmere were forced to move and the name went with them. The present Prenton Park was opened on 9 March 1912. There were stands (also known as bleachers) on both sides of the pitch, a paddock and three open terraces, the general format which remained until 1994.

Many improvements to the ground were driven by changes in legislation. The biggest change of all took place during 1994 and 1995. The Taylor Report suggested that all stadia in the top two divisions of English football should no longer permit standing. The club's response was to redevelop three sides of the ground with entirely new all-seater stands created – the Borough Road Stand (now the Johnny King Stand), the Cowshed and the new Kop, with the existing Main Stand remaining. Capacity in the ground thus increased from 14,200 to the 16,567 of today. On 11 March 1995, having been built at a cost of £3.1 million, the new ground was officially opened.

Attendances at the ground have fluctuated over its hundred-year history. Around 8,000 visitors watched the first game at the stadium, as Tranmere beat Lancaster Town 8–0. Prenton Park's largest-ever crowd was 24,424 for a 1972 FA Cup match between Tranmere and Stoke City. Average attendances since the renovation range from just above 5000 in the early 2010s and the Non-League years, to the upper 8000s in the 90s, during the First Division years. In the 2020s, attendances have remained mostly in the low to mid 6000s.

== Supporters and rivalries ==
Tranmere Rovers had an average home attendance of 6,398 during the 2024–25 season, making them the 10th best supported club in League Two. The club has a number of supporters' groups, including the Tranmere Rovers Supporters Trust and the Tranmere Rovers Official Supporters Club. In 2010, the trust raised £12,500 for the club to sign Andy Robinson on loan. Tranmere Rovers have been the subject of an independent supporters' fanzine Give Us an R since the 1990s.

Despite being geographically closest to Everton and Liverpool, Tranmere's time in the lower leagues has meant that they have rarely met either club and have built up traditional rivalries with near neighbours Wrexham and Chester. According to a survey entitled 'The League of Love and Hate' conducted in August 2019, Tranmere fans listed the more distant Bolton Wanderers and Oldham Athletic as their biggest rivals, followed by Everton, Liverpool and Crewe Alexandra, although the census did not contain non-league clubs (Chester and, at that time, Wrexham). Tranmere also had a fierce rivalry with Wallasey-based near neighbour New Brighton, until that club failed to be re-elected to the Football League in 1951.

As of the end of the 2022–23 season, Tranmere had met the following teams most times in the Football League:

Statistics, to end of 2022–23 season
Opponents	P	W	D	L	W%
Crewe Alexandra	120	53	26	41	44.2
Hartlepool United	118	52	28	38	44.1
Rochdale	113	54	23	36	47.8
Stockport County	108	40	31	37	37.0
Halifax Town	104	42	28	34	40.4
Wrexham	102	38	25	39	37.3
Chesterfield	94	31	19	44	33.0
Bradford City	86	36	20	30	41.9
Darlington	82	38	13	31	46.3
Southport	80	38	22	20	47.5

== Tranmere Rovers Ladies ==
Tranmere Rovers Ladies Football Club were founded in 1990. Based on the Wirral, they are affiliated with the men's team and play most of their home games at Ellesmere Port Sports Village. Between 1996 and 2004 they competed in the FA Premier League National Division, then the top tier of the English women's football pyramid. As of 2025, they play in the North West Regional League, Premier Division.

== Players ==
=== First-team squad ===
As of 5 September 2026

Note: Flags indicate national team as defined under FIFA eligibility rules; some limited exceptions apply. Players may hold more than one non-FIFA nationality.

No.	Pos.	Nation	Player
1	GK	ENG	Luke McGee
2	DF	ENG	Joel Senior
3	DF	IRL	Jacob Slater
4	DF	ENG	Jordan Turnbull
5	DF	ENG	Nathan Smith
6	MF	WAL	Will Vaulks (captain)
7	MF	ENG	Charlie Whitaker
8	MF	ENG	Sam Finley
9	FW	ENG	Joe Ironside
10	MF	ENG	Tom Ince
11	MF	ENG	Tom Conlon
12	GK	ENG	Harrison Male
13	GK	JAM	Coniah Boyce-Clarke
14	DF	ENG	Olly Scott
15	MF	WAL	Jordan Davies

No.	Pos.	Nation	Player
16	DF	ENG	Bobby Faulkner (on loan from Doncaster Rovers)
17	FW	USA	Zane Okoro (on loan from Lincoln City)
18	FW	ENG	Connor Jennings
19	FW	ENG	Courtney Baker-Richardson
20	MF	ENG	Charlie Veevers
22	MF	IRL	Lee O'Connor
23	DF	ENG	Patrick Brough
24	FW	SLE	David Kamara (on loan from Peterborough United)
25	MF	ENG	Lewis Warrington
26	FW	ENG	James Plant
27	FW	ENG	Sam Mann
28	DF	ENG	Jack McEvilly
29	FW	ENG	Dylan Jones (on loan from Norwich City)
30	DF	WAL	George Nevett (on loan from Peterborough United)

=== Out on loan ===
Note: Flags indicate national team as defined under FIFA eligibility rules; some limited exceptions apply. Players may hold more than one non-FIFA nationality.

No.	Pos.	Nation	Player
21	MF	WAL	Josh Williams (at Colwyn Bay until January 2027)

=== Former players ===
As part of the club's 125th anniversary celebrations in 2010, a hall of fame was announced, initially honouring seven former players and managers: Ian Muir, John Aldridge, John King, Ray Mathias, Steve Mungall, John Morrissey, and Pat Nevin. Harold Bell holds the record for the most consecutive league appearances for a British team. He was picked for the first game after the Second World War in the 1946–47 season and did not miss a match until 30 August 1955, a total of 401 consecutive matches in the Third Division North.

== Officials ==
=== Coaching staff ===
As of 22 July 2026

List of staff
Position	Name
Manager	Darrell Clarke
Assistant Manager	Dean Whitehead
First Team Coach	Andy Parkinson
Sports Scientist	Mark Cowan
Player Development Manager	Alan Morgan
Chief Scout	Ollie Knight
First Team Analyst	Kieran Stephens
Kitman	Ollie Patchett
Kit Assistant	Chid Kelly
Goalkeeping Coach	Brian Jensen

=== Managers ===
By the start of the 2024–25 season, the club had employed 40 managers. The first man to hold this position was Bert Cooke, appointed in 1912. He oversaw the club's entry into the Football League, and remained in charge for 23 years, the longest spell of any manager at the club. Major changes were not seen until businessman Dave Russell took over in 1961. His introductions included the team's current all-white kit and regularly arranged floodlit home fixtures on Friday evenings rather than the usual Saturday afternoon. Rock band and Tranmere fans Half Man Half Biscuit described the practice in their song "Friday Night And The Gates Are Low".

Tranmere's most successful period came at the end of the twentieth century. John King returned for his third spell at the club in 1987, having previously both played for and managed the team. He led them to a victory in the League Trophy, and from the bottom of the Fourth Division to, on three occasions, reach the semi-finals in play-offs that had as their prize a promotion to the Premier League. Under King's replacement, John Aldridge, Tranmere appeared in the 2000 Football League Cup final. From 2009, they were managed by former club physiotherapist, Les Parry, until he was sacked on 4 March 2012, and replaced by Ronnie Moore. In February 2014, media reports suggested Moore was under investigation by The Football Association, for breaching its rules against betting on competitions in which his club were involved. Three days later, Tranmere suspended Moore, and then sacked him on 9 April 2014, after he conceded that the FA's charges were valid.

On 27 May 2014, the club announced that Rob Edwards had been appointed as their new manager. Tranmere sacked Edwards on 13 October 2014. Moving quickly to arrest the decline which had seen Tranmere slump to the bottom of League Two, Tranmere announced former Port Vale manager Micky Adams's appointment as Edwards's successor on 16 October 2014. He left the club by mutual consent on 19 April 2015, when the club were bottom of the league with two matches remaining. Gary Brabin, whose contract was in turn ended in September 2016, replaced Adams. Tranmere appointed Micky Mellon as manager the following month, and he led the team to a pair of consecutive play-off final victories in the 2017–18 and 2018–19 seasons, the last of which brought a return to League One for the club. After four years at Tranmere, Mellon moved to Dundee United on 6 July 2020.

On 18 July 2020, Mellon's former assistant manager Mike Jackson was appointed as manager, however his tenure was short-lived. After only two league wins in his first 10 games Jackson was sacked on 31 October 2020 following a 1–0 home defeat to Morecambe. Keith Hill replaced Jackson as first team manager on 21 November. Hill's first game ended in a 1–0 victory against Carlisle United. His side were top of the form table (after 20 games) in February, the team's spine spearheaded by Scott Davies, Peter Clarke, Manny Monthé, Jay Spearing, Paul Lewis and James Vaughan. Hill was sacked in May 2021, after the team had reached the League Two play-offs, but before the play-off matches took place. At the end of May 2021, Micky Mellon returned to Tranmere for a second spell as manager.

Full time managers are shown below (excluding caretaker managers).

Managerial statistics, to 22 June 2024
Manager	From	To	P	W	D	L	W%	Reference
Bert Cooke	1 August 1912	30 April 1935	607	258	123	226	42.5	
Jack Carr	1 May 1935	1 November 1936	60	27	17	16	45.0	
Jim Knowles	1 November 1936	1 January 1939	98	38	16	44	38.8	
Bill Ridding	1 January 1939	31 May 1945	20	3	3	14	15.0	
Ernest Blackburn	1 September 1946	1 May 1955	421	172	83	166	40.9	
Noel Kelly	1 July 1955	1 October 1957	107	26	25	56	24.3	
Peter Farrell	1 October 1957	31 December 1960	164	63	34	67	38.4	
Walter Galbraith	1 January 1961	1 December 1961	43	20	3	20	46.5	
Dave Russell	1 December 1961	1 December 1969	402	175	88	139	43.5	
Jackie Wright	1 December 1969	1 April 1972	132	35	57	40	26.5	
Ron Yeats	8 April 1972	4 April 1975	156	49	44	63	31.4	
John King	13 April 1975	30 September 1980	269	86	79	104	32.0	
Bryan Hamilton	1 October 1980	7 February 1985	232	75	64	93	32.3	
Frank Worthington	9 July 1985	11 February 1987	83	24	23	36	28.9	
John King	13 April 1987	12 April 1996	488	211	129	148	43.2	
John Aldridge	12 April 1996	17 March 2001	269	93	78	98	34.6	
Dave Watson	20 May 2001	1 August 2002	55	22	15	18	40.0	
Ray Mathias	1 August 2002	29 September 2003	66	29	18	19	43.9	
Brian Little	12 October 2003	9 June 2006	147	61	43	43	41.5	
Ronnie Moore	9 June 2006	5 June 2009	171	71	42	58	41.5	
John Barnes	14 June 2009	9 October 2009	14	3	1	10	21.4	
Les Parry	9 October 2009	4 March 2012	131	40	34	57	30.5	
Ronnie Moore	4 March 2012	9 April 2014	111	41	25	45	36.9	
Rob Edwards	27 May 2014	13 October 2014	14	2	4	8	14.3	
Micky Adams	16 October 2014	19 April 2015	38	10	11	17	26.3	
Gary Brabin	5 May 2015	18 September 2016	60	28	15	17	46.7	
Micky Mellon	7 October 2016	6 July 2020	198	91	45	62	46.0	
Mike Jackson	18 July 2020	31 October 2020	13	3	5	5	23.1	
Keith Hill	21 November 2020	11 May 2021	40	20	10	10	50.0	
Micky Mellon	31 May 2021	19 March 2023	97	39	25	33	40.2	
Ian Dawes	20 March 2023	10 September 2023	19	3	5	11	15.8	
Nigel Adkins	2 November 2023	26 February 2025	72	23	16	33	31.9	
Andy Crosby	26 February 2025	4 March 2026	54	17	15	22	31.5	
Pete Wild	10 March 2025	10 May 2026	8	1	2	5	12.5	

== Honours ==
League

- Third Division North / Third Division (level 3)
  - Champions: 1937–38
  - Play-off winners: 1991
- Fourth Division / League Two (level 4)
  - Runners-up: 1988–89
  - Promoted: 1966–67, 1975–76
  - Play-off winners: 2019
- National League (level 5)
  - Play-off winners: 2018
- The Combination
  - Champions: 1907–08
- Lancashire Combination
  - Champions: 1913–14
- Lancashire Combination Division Two
  - Promoted: 1911–12

Cup

- Football League Cup
  - Runners-up: 1999–2000
- Associate Members' Cup / Football League Trophy / EFL Trophy
  - Winners: 1989–90
  - Runners-up: 1990–91, 2020–21
- Welsh Cup
  - Winners: 1934–35

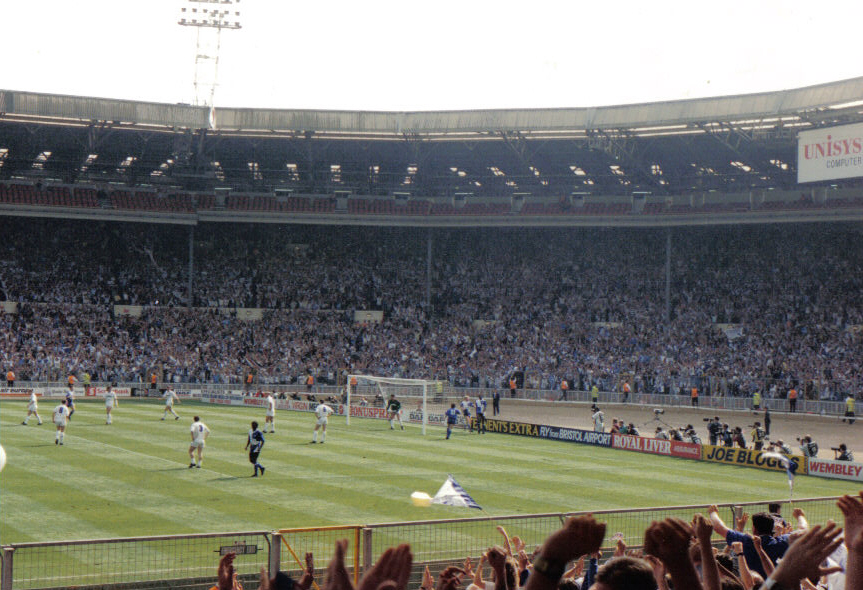
Tranmere playing against Bristol Rovers in the final of the 1990 Football League Trophy

== Records ==
- Highest league finish: 4th in First Division (level 2), 1992–93
- Best FA Cup performance: Quarter-finals, 1999–2000, 2000–01, 2003–04
- Best League Cup performance: Runners-up, 1999–2000
- Best League Trophy performance: Winners, 1989–90
- Best FA Trophy performance: Semi-finals, 2016–17
- Record win:
  - 13–4, against Oldham Athletic, 26 December 1935 The aggregate of 17 goals in one game remains a league record.
  - 9–0 against Solihull Moors, 8 April 2017
- Record defeat:
  - 1–9 against Tottenham Hotspur, FA Cup 3rd round replay, 14 January 1953
- Highest home attendance: 24,424, against Stoke City, 5 February 1972, FA Cup
- Most goals (total): Ian Muir, 180
- Most goals in a season: Bunny Bell (1934–35) and John Aldridge (1991–92)
- Most appearances: Ray Mathias, 637
