= Micky Mellon =

Scottish footballer and manager (born 1972)

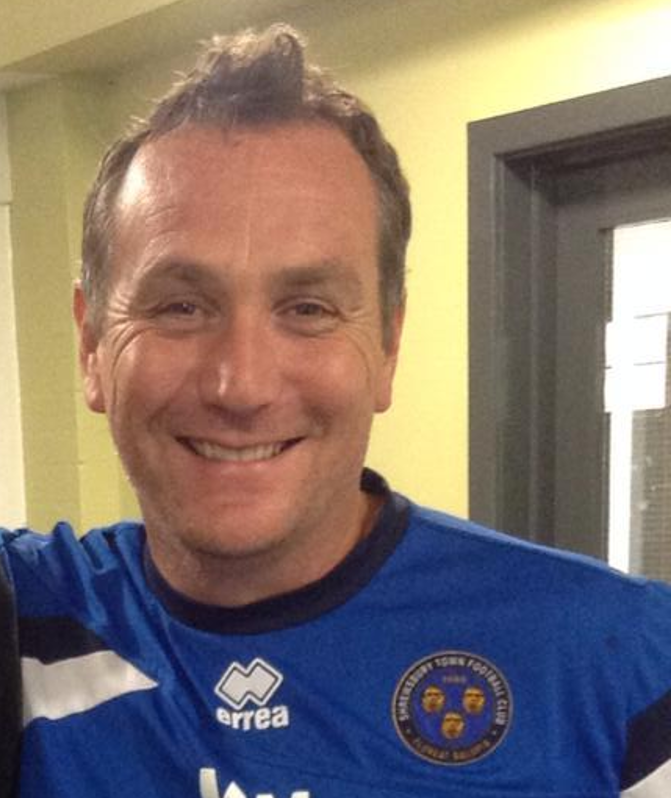
- Mellon with Shrewsbury Town in 2015

Personal information
- Full name: Michael Joseph Mellon
- Date of birth: 18 March 1972 (age 54)
- Place of birth: Paisley, Renfrewshire, Scotland
- Position: Midfielder

Team information
- Current team: Oldham Athletic (manager)

Senior career*
Years	Team	Apps	(Gls)
1989–1993	Bristol City	35	(1)
1991–1992	→ Cork City (loan)	11	(3)
1993–1994	West Bromwich Albion	45	(6)
1994–1997	Blackpool	125	(14)
1997–1999	Tranmere Rovers	57	(3)
1999–2001	Burnley	85	(5)
2001	→ Tranmere Rovers (loan)	1	(0)
2001–2004	Tranmere Rovers	115	(3)
2004–2005	Kidderminster Harriers	7	(0)
2005	Witton Albion	7	(0)
2005–2006	Lancaster City	2	(0)
Total		490	(35)

Managerial career
- 2008–2012: Fleetwood Town
- 2013: Barnsley (caretaker)
- 2014–2016: Shrewsbury Town
- 2016–2020: Tranmere Rovers
- 2020–2021: Dundee United
- 2021–2023: Tranmere Rovers
- 2023–: Oldham Athletic
- * Club domestic league appearances and goals

Michael Joseph Mellon (born 18 March 1972) is a Scottish professional football coach and former player who is the manager of EFL League Two club Oldham Athletic. As a player, he was a midfielder for clubs including Bristol City, West Bromwich Albion, Blackpool, Tranmere and Burnley.

Mellon began his managerial career with Fleetwood Town, where he took the club into the Football League for the first time in their history by winning the 2011–12 Football Conference title. He has overseen six promotions in total as a manager with Fleetwood, Shrewsbury Town, Tranmere and Oldham. After a year with Scottish Premiership club Dundee United, Mellon returned to Tranmere in June 2021 but was dismissed in March 2023. In October 2023, he was appointed as Oldham Athletic manager.

== Early life ==
Micky Mellon was born in Paisley, Renfrewshire. His family moved to Glasgow when he was nine months old, and he grew up in the South Nitshill area.

== Playing career ==
Mellon began his career in 1989 as a 17-year-old with Bristol City gaining promotion to the old Second Division, then managed by Joe Jordan. In 1991, he was loaned out for two months to League of Ireland club Cork City, making his League of Ireland debut on 20 October 1991. He made eleven league appearances for Cork, scoring three goals.

He spent four years at Ashton Gate, before joining Midlanders West Bromwich Albion in 1993 for a fee of £75,000. He played 45 league games for West Brom, scoring six goals in their promotion season ending in a play off victory over Port Vale at Wembley. It was his move to Blackpool for a fee of £50,000 in 1994, however, that saw Mellon establish himself as a regular on the team and scoresheet. Under Sam Allardyce's guidance, Mellon made 138 appearances and scored 17 goals in all competitions. He was voted the club's player of the year in the 1995–96 season as the club just missed out on promotion from Division Two.

The season following Allardyce's sacking in 1997, Mellon moved up a division to join Tranmere Rovers, who were then playing in Division One, for a fee of £300,000. He spent two seasons at Prenton Park, followed by another two with Burnley, whom he joined for £350,000 gaining promotion finishing second to Preston North End. He returned to Tranmere Rovers in March 2001 initially on loan, and then on a free transfer. He was released in May 2004.

Mellon joined Kidderminster Harriers in August 2004, signing a two-year contract.

After leaving Harriers, Mellon spent a short spell at Witton Albion in 2005 before joining Lancaster City.

== Managerial and coaching career ==
=== Lancaster City and Burnley ===
Mellon was appointed as assistant manager of Lancaster City in June 2006. However, on 10 October after an FA Cup defeat to Scarborough he left the club along with four players for financial reasons. He moved to his former club Burnley as a youth team coach, coaching the Under-15 and Under-16 teams.

=== Fleetwood Town ===
Fleetwood chairman Andy Pilley appointed Mellon as manager on 23 September, succeeding Tony Greenwood. Mellon initially divided his time between coaching the Under-15 and Under-16 teams at Burnley and managing Fleetwood. However, on 12 January 2009, his position was made full-time, a first in the history of the club. Mellon led Fleetwood to a successful FA Cup run, reaching the second round for the first time in their history. He introduced a number of new faces to the playing staff, and over the course of the season produced a settled team with increasingly improving league results. Fleetwood finished the season in eighth place, having been bottom of the league when he was appointed.

From the beginning of the 2009–10 season, Fleetwood were seen as serious promotion contenders. By the end of 2009, Southport and Fleetwood had established themselves as the two strongest teams in the league. A 5–0 defeat to Southport on Boxing Day at Haig Avenue appeared to have tipped the balance Southport's way, but this was followed by a 4–0 Fleetwood victory in the return fixture at Highbury on New Year's Day.

The demise of Farsley Celtic late in the season led to their entire 2009–10 playing record being expunged, thereby costing Fleetwood three points relative to Southport. Fleetwood appealed against the decision but the appeal was rejected the day before the last match of the season, leaving Southport one point ahead. A final day 2–0 victory over Stalybridge Celtic proved ultimately inadequate in securing the championship as Southport defeated Eastwood Town 3–0 away from home to win the championship, and the automatic promotion place, by one point. A two-legged playoff semi-final against Droylsden away was decided on penalties, as a 2–0 defeat, countered by a 3–1 victory at Highbury. Goalkeeper Danny Hurst saved the last penalty to put Fleetwood through 4–3. The final was played against Alfreton Town at Highbury on 9 May, in front of a new record capacity crowd of 3,592.

Fleetwood defeated Alfreton 2–1 in the play-off final. The team's second-place finish and ultimate promotion to the Conference, the fifth tier of English football, secured the highest position in the club's history since the 1997 re-establishment.

In the 2010–2011 season, Fleetwood finished fifth in the Conference National, losing the play-off semi-final 8–1 on aggregate to Wimbledon.

Fleetwood won the 2011–2012 Conference National, attaining 103 points in the process. Fleetwood progressed to the third round of the FA Cup for the first time in their history; beating Wycombe and Yeovil before finally succumbing 5–1 to neighbours Blackpool in front of a sell-out crowd.

After three defeats in a row, including a second round FA Cup exit to Aldershot Town, Mellon was sacked on 1 December 2012 with Fleetwood in 4th place.

=== Barnsley ===
In December 2012 Mellon was asked to assist David Flitcroft who was caretaker manager at Barnsley following the sacking of Keith Hill. In January 2013 Flitcroft was appointed permanent manager with Mellon as his assistant. Mellon helped to keep Barnsley in the Championship by securing a point at Huddersfield Town on 4 May 2013. On 10 May 2013 he agreed a new deal to stay at Oakwell.

In October 2013 Barnsley turned down two approaches for Mellon from Conference Premier side Forest Green to take over as their Manager. Mellon said "Barnsley had two approaches, but the club turned them down twice because they want to keep me. "So I am happy to stay at Barnsley as long as they want me because the Championship is where I want to be. "(But) I am delighted that there are people who think I can do a job and saw what I achieved at Fleetwood."

On 19 March 2014, Barnsley sacked Mellon. A club statement read: "Barnsley Football Club has (on Wednesday) terminated the employment of assistant manager Micky Mellon and goalkeeping coach Ian Willcock with immediate effect. "The club would like to place on record its thanks to both Micky and Ian for their service and wish them all the best for the future."

=== Shrewsbury Town ===
Mellon was appointed as the new manager of Shrewsbury Town on 12 May 2014, with former caretaker manager Michael Jackson and Danny Coyne remaining as his assistants following the club's relegation back to League Two. Inheriting only a handful of players from the previous regime, Mellon made 16 signings over the close season, reuniting with former Fleetwood Town striker Andy Mangan, and ex-Barnsley players Liam Lawrence and Jordan Clark.

Shrewsbury went unbeaten in their first month of the 2014–15 season, including League Cup upsets over Blackpool and away at Premier League newcomers Leicester City. Despite hitting a difficult run of form in September, they also beat Championship leaders Norwich City to set up a fourth round home tie with Chelsea.

Despite exiting the 2014–15 FA Cup in the second round, a narrow 1–0 away defeat at Preston North End, Shrewsbury enjoyed a highly consistent season in the league, culminating in winning promotion back to the third tier of English football at the first attempt, following a 1–0 away victory at Cheltenham Town on 25 April 2015.

The following season, Mellon led Shrewsbury to the fifth round of the FA Cup for the first time since 1991, notably knocking out Championship opponents Cardiff City and Sheffield Wednesday in the third and fourth rounds respectively. The fifth round saw Shrewsbury draw Manchester United at home for the first ever competitive fixture between the two clubs which subsequently ended Shrewsbury's FA cup run after a 3–0 defeat. Shrewsbury spent much of the league season battling relegation. Despite losing 3–4 at home to Peterborough United in the penultimate game of the season, same day defeats for Doncaster Rovers and Blackpool ensured another season of League One football, with one game to spare.

=== Tranmere Rovers ===
Mellon left Shrewsbury Town on 6 October 2016, after winning only two of the opening eleven games of the 2016–17 season, and was appointed manager of Tranmere Rovers in the National League. On 12 May 2018 Mellon led Tranmere back into the Football League with victory over Boreham Wood in the National League play-off final. On 25 May 2019, Tranmere made it back-to-back promotions, winning the League Two playoff at Wembley, 1–0, over Newport County, thus securing their spot in League One for the 2019–20 season.

By March 2020, the team were within the relegation zone, but with a game in hand on their nearest rivals and on a run of three successive victories. The cancellation of fixtures due to the COVID-19 pandemic meant that the season could not be completed, and a vote was taken by League One clubs on 9 June to resolve promotion and relegation issues on a points per game (PPG) basis. This meant that Tranmere would be relegated to League Two for the 2020/21 season.

=== Dundee United ===
Mellon was appointed as manager of Scottish Premiership club Dundee United on 6 July 2020. It was his first time working in his homeland as either a player or a manager. Mellon left United after the 2020–21 season, in which they finished in 9th place.

=== Return to Tranmere Rovers ===
After his year in Dundee, Mellon returned to Tranmere Rovers for a second spell as manager. Despite a strong start to the season, Mellon was sacked by Tranmere on 19 March 2023 following a 3-1 defeat to Newport County which left the club 14th in League Two. This followed a string of results that included six wins since mid-October.

=== Oldham Athletic ===
On 13 October 2023, Mellon was appointed manager of National League club Oldham Athletic on a three-year contract, taking charge following the club's next fixture. On 1 June 2025, Mellon led Oldham back into the Football League with a dramatic 3-2 extra-time victory over Southend United in the National League play-off final.

He was named League Two Manager of the Month for March 2026 after sixteen points from seven matches saw the Latics climb the table into play-off contention.

== Personal life ==
Mellon has lived in Blackpool since 1994. He is married to Jane. He opened the very first franchised energie Shokk gym aimed at teenagers with his wife in Blackpool in February 2009. The gym later went out of business in October 2009.

He has co-authored a book about football management, The First 100 Days: Lessons in Leadership from the Football Bosses, published in March 2021.

Mellon's son, Michael, is also a professional footballer.

== Managerial statistics ==
As of match played 21 November 2026

Managerial record by team and tenure
Team	From	To	Record					Ref.
Team	From	To	P	W	D	L	Win %	Ref.
Fleetwood Town	27 September 2008	1 December 2012	225	116	58	51	51.6	
Barnsley (caretaker)	30 November 2013	17 December 2013	3	1	1	1	33.3	
Shrewsbury Town	12 May 2014	6 October 2016	125	53	25	47	42.4	
Tranmere Rovers	6 October 2016	6 July 2020	199	92	45	62	46.2	
Dundee United	6 July 2020	25 May 2021	46	15	15	16	32.6	
Tranmere Rovers	1 June 2021	19 March 2023	97	39	25	33	40.2	
Oldham Athletic	13 October 2023	Present	164	63	47	54	38.4	
Total			858	379	216	263	44.2	

== Honours ==
=== Player ===
Individual

- Blackpool Player of the Season: 1995–96
- PFA Team of the Year: 1995–96 Second Division

=== Manager ===
Fleetwood Town

- Conference Premier: 2011–12
- Conference North play-offs: 2010

Shrewsbury Town

- Football League Two second-place promotion: 2014–15

Tranmere Rovers

- EFL League Two play-offs: 2019
- National League play-offs: 2018

Oldham Athletic

- National League play-offs: 2025

Individual

- EFL League Two Manager of the Month: March 2019, December 2021, March 2026
