= 2014–15 Tranmere Rovers F.C. season =

Tranmere Rovers F.C.
2014–15 season
- Chairman: Peter Johnson (until 11 August); Mark Palios (from 11 August)
- Manager: Rob Edwards (until 13 October); Micky Adams (until 19 April); Alan Rogers (from 19 April)
- League Two: 24th (relegated)
- FA Cup: Third round
- Football League Cup: First round
- Football League Trophy: Area semi-final
- Top goalscorer: League: Max Power (7); All: Max Power (13)
- Highest home attendance: 7,518 vs Bury (2 May)
- Lowest home attendance: 3,948 vs Newport County (16 September)
- Average home league attendance: 5,192 (7th in the league)
Home colours	Away colours	Third colours

The 2014–15 season was the 114th season of competitive association football and the 88th season in the Football League played by Tranmere Rovers Football Club, a professional football club based in Birkenhead, Wirral. The results on the final day of the 2013–14 season meant Tranmere were relegated from League One and were to spend this season in League Two for the first time since promotion from it in 1988–89. On 11 August, former Football Association chief executive and ex-Tranmere Rovers player Mark Palios and his wife Nicola took a controlling interest in the club from outgoing chairman Peter Johnson.

On 27 May 2014, Rob Edwards was appointed as the new manager replacing Ronnie Moore, who was suspended in the middle of February 2014 for breaching FA rules. The summer transfer window saw twelve players join the club, including experienced striker Kayode Odejayi while Ryan Lowe left the club shortly after being handed the Player of the Season award. Edwards was sacked after just five months following the home loss to Plymouth Argyle which saw Tranmere Rovers at the bottom of League Two. Three days later Micky Adams was announced as new manager. A brief improvement in results which saw Tranmere reach the Third Round of the FA Cup and move out of the relegation zone was followed by disastrous spring form resulting in Adams leaving Tranmere by mutual consent two games before the end of the season, with the club again bottom of the table. Assistant manager Alan Rogers took charge, but on 25 April Tranmere was defeated at Plymouth Argyle which confirmed Rovers' relegation to the National League one round prior to the end of the season. Thus, Tranmere Rovers' ninety-four-year presence in the Football League had ended.

The season saw forty-eight players make at least one appearance in nationally organised first-team competition, including 24 players joining on loan. Max Power participated in fifty-three matches missing only one game, and he finished as leading scorer with thirteen goals.

== Background and pre-season ==
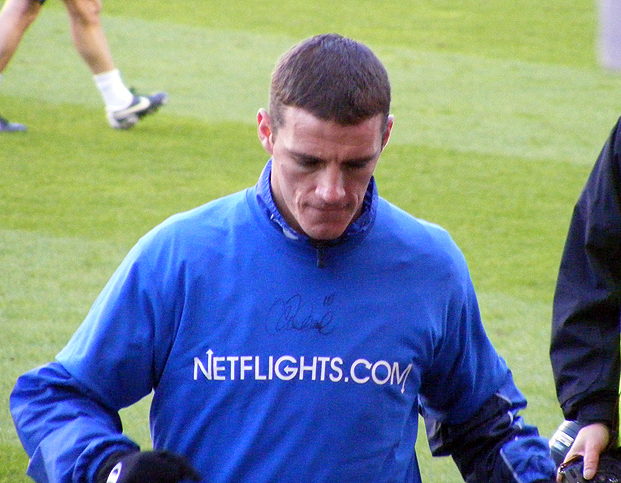
Former Welsh international Jason Koumas spent the second consecutive season in Tranmere Rovers after the renewal of his career in the summer of 2013. Following 2014–15 season he ended his playing career. Coincidentally, both season ended with relegation.

Tranmere Rovers ended the previous season with John McMahon as caretaker manager after manager Ronnie Moore was suspended by the club in the middle of February 2014 for breaching FA rules against betting on competitions in which his club were involved. On 6 May, 42-year old Jamaican international Ian Goodison ended his ten-year stay at Prenton Park in which he made 410 appearances and won the Player of the Season accolade three times. Also, experienced forward Jean-Louis Akpa Akpro was released. On the same day, the club offered new contracts to five players, though finally only veteran Jason Koumas agreed to sign a new one-year deal, while goalkeeper Jason Mooney, defender Ash Taylor and midfielders James Wallace and Steve Jennings left the club. Eleven players, including first-choice goalkeeper Owain Fôn Williams and Player of the Season 2013–14 Ryan Lowe already had contracts for the upcoming season. Despite that, on 19 May Lowe, whose request to sign a longer contract was refused by the club, was transferred to division rivals Bury for an undisclosed fee.

On 27 May, 41-year old former Welsh international Rob Edwards was appointed new Tranmere Rovers manager with John McMahon staying at the club as assistant manager. It was the first managerial experience for Edwards, who had been an assistant at Exeter City previously. The next day, the first signing was made – 22-year old Welsh striker Eliot Richards signed a two-year contract. He was followed by his Bristol Rovers teammate midfielder Matthew Gill. Previously Gill had spent three seasons with Exeter, winning back-to-back promotions from the Conference National and League Two together with Edwards. Further Edwards signings were young central defender Michael Ihiekwe from Wolverhampton Wanderers, ex-Rotherham United striker Kayode Odejayi, 24-year old defender Marcus Holness from Burton Albion, Scottish midfielder Marc Laird released by Southend United and 30-year old defender Danny Woodards, while Evan Horwood cancelled his contract with Tranmere Rovers by mutual consent to return to Northampton Town, where he had spent end of the previous season on loan. On 4 August, ex-Tranmere Rovers player Joe Thompson had been signed by Bury. The midfielder was sidelined since November 2013 when he was diagnosed with a rare form of cancer. In June he was given the all-clear after completing a course of chemotherapy, but he had not been contacted to negotiate a new contract with Tranmere Rovers.

On 30 May, new home kits in the traditional all-white design were revealed for the upcoming season, while the existing away kits were retained.

=== Pre-season matches ===
14 July 2014	Cammell Laird 1907	0–5	Tranmere Rovers	Kirklands Stadium, Birkenhead
19:00		TRFC Report	Power 20' (pen.); Kirby 64'; Stockton 68', 89'; Richards 74'

15 July 2014	Vauxhall Motors	1–4	Tranmere Rovers	Rivacre Park, Ellesmere Port
19:30	Herbert 29'	TRFC Report	Richards 13'; Power 47'; Bell-Baggie 68' (pen.), 83'

18 July 2014	Rhyl	3–1	Tranmere Rovers	Belle Vue, Rhyl
19:15	Ellams 24', 45+1'; Bowen 34'	TRFC Report	Stockton 74'

19 July 2014	Marine	2–1	Tranmere Rovers	Arriva Stadium, Crosby
15:00	Fowler 8'; Williams 77' (pen.)	TRFC Report	Richards 66'

22 July 2014	Tranmere Rovers	2–2	Everton	Birkenhead
19:45	Stockton 63'; Rowe 87'	TRFC Report	Naismith 26'; Osman 71'	Stadium: Prenton Park; Referee: Antony Taylor

25 July 2014	Tranmere Rovers	1–1	Bolton Wanderers	Birkenhead
19:30	Richards 75'	TRFC Report	Spearing 36'	Stadium: Prenton Park; Referee: Chris Foy

30 July 2014	Chester	1–1	Tranmere Rovers	Chester
19:30	Boland 45' (o.g.)	TRFC Report	Rowe 14'	Stadium: Deva Stadium

== Review ==
=== August ===
Tranmere Rovers started the season at home against the previous season's play-off semi-finalists York City. A ninety-fourth minute James Rowe goal earned Rovers a draw after Keith Lowe opened the scoring in the middle of the second half. Six players earned their first competitive caps for Rovers, while ex-Tranmere goalkeeper Jason Mooney took his place in York's starting line-up.

On 11 August, former Football Association chief executive and ex-Tranmere Rovers player Mark Palios and his wife Nicola took a controlling interest in the club from outgoing chairman Peter Johnson. Palios become Executive Chairman of the club, with Nicola as Vice-Chairman, and Johnson as Honorary President. This ended Johnson's 27-year spell as an owner, which counts the most successful period in the club's history due to three consecutive First Division play-off finishes in the early 90s and the 2000 Football League Cup Final. The next day assistant manager John McMahon left the club by mutual agreement as Rob Edwards wanted to make a change in his coaching department. Alex Russell, familiar to Edwards from playing at Exeter, joined Tranmere Rovers as the Club's new first team coach.

On 12 August, Tranmere were knocked out of the League Cup after a home defeat to the Championship side Nottingham Forest through a single first half goal. Rovers played with a numerical advantage for almost the whole second half after Michael Mancienne was sent off. In the next two games Tranmere was defeated by Shrewsbury Town 1–2 after two late goals and earned their first win and clean sheet at Wycombe Wanderers by scoring a goal either side of half-time. On 18 August, Edwards added to the squad with the first loan signing of the season, bringing young Saint Lucian defender Janoi Donacien over from Aston Villa until January 2015. Tranmere were defeated at home by Cheltenham Town 2–3 despite leading 2–0 at half-time. The first month of the season was concluded with a victory against 10-man Morecambe. Both goals were scored by Cole Stockton who extended his contract with Tranmere earlier that week till the summer of 2017.

=== September ===
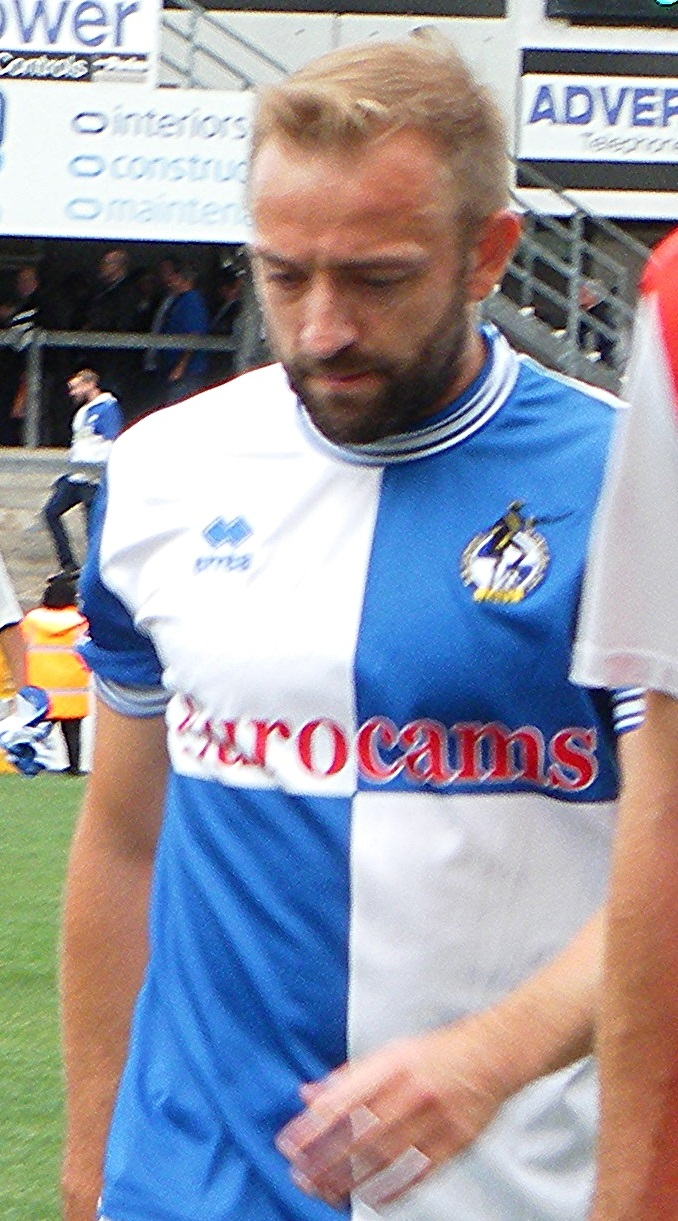
Defender Matthew Gill was named assistant manager, though he left the club shortly after Rob Edwards was sacked.

On the final day of the summer transfer window, Tranmere Rovers signed Slovak goalkeeper Peter Brezovan and bought ex-Rochdale striker George Donnelly for an undisclosed fee. Also, defender Hill signed a permanent deal after a successful contribution on a non-contract basis, though shortly after he suffered an Achilles tendon injury that ruled him out for six months. Tranmere was defeated 2–3 at Accrington Stanley, for the third time in the season losing the game after taking the lead. On 8 September, 33-year old Matthew Gill was named assistant manager. After goalless draws against Hartlepool United and Newport County, Tranmere was defeated by Exeter City and Carlisle United with former Rovers winger David Amoo scoring decisive goal for Carlisle.

=== October ===
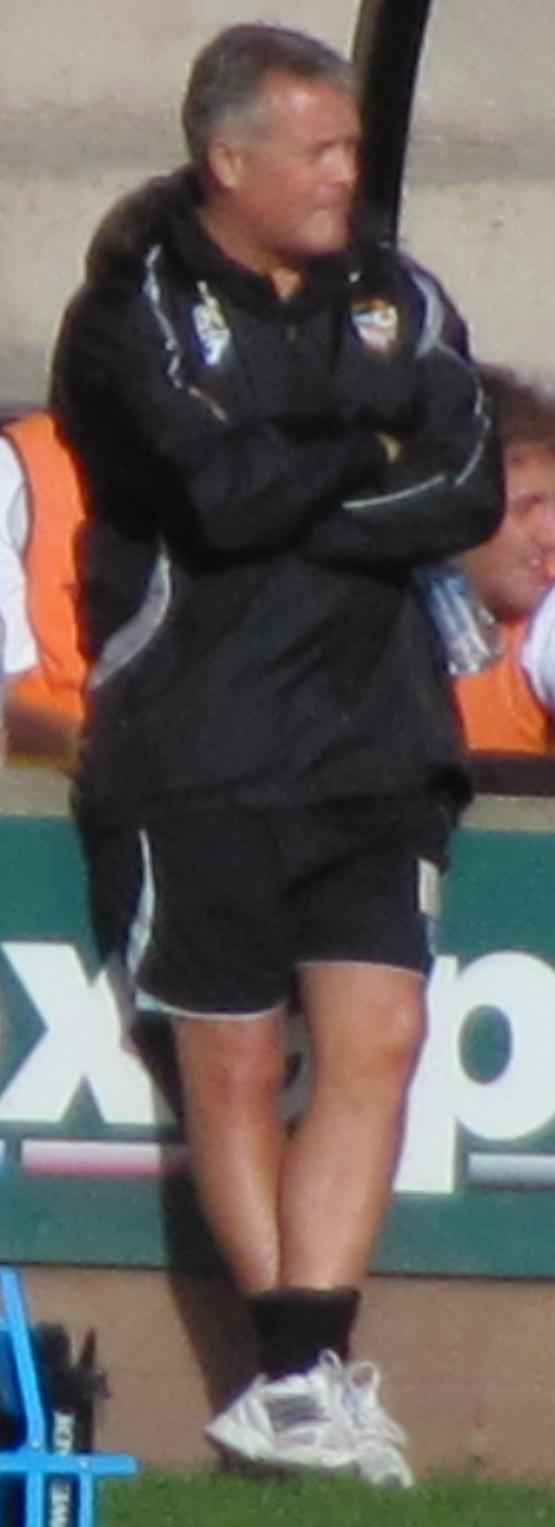
Micky Adams was a manager of the team from October to April.

Rovers' losing streak resumed in October with a loss at league leaders Bury. Tranmere finally scored a goal, which was only their second in seven games, in the League Trophy Second Round clash against Carlisle United. The game went to a shoot-out, won by Rovers 5–4 after Patrick Brough missed the sixth shot for the guests. On 11 October, after fourth consecutive league defeat at Plymouth Argyle, Tranmere Rovers reached the bottom of the League Two table with only nine points in 12 games. Two days later manager Rob Edwards had been sacked. On 16 November, ex-Port Vale manager Micky Adams was announced as his replacement, though the team was to be prepared for the next game by the assistant managers. Adams took charge after a fifth straight league defeat and announced the return to the club of Chris Shuker as assistant manager while Alex Russell left the club. Also, a double loan signing was made in order to strengthen the attack line: Armand Gnanduillet joined from Chesterfield and Danny Johnson signed from Cardiff City, while midfielder Steve Jennings, who was signed by Adams for Port Vale last summer, rejoined him at Tranmere on loan until January.

In the first game under Micky Adams Tranmere ended their losing streak after a goalless draw against Mansfield Town. It was followed by a 2–2 draw at Wimbledon, both Rovers goals were scored by Gnanduillet.

=== November ===
November started with a third draw in a row against Stevenage, with Jennings scoring a goal in the first game after his comeback. Ahead of the game, a bronze statue of Tranmere Rovers' most successful manager Johnny King was unveiled outside Prenton Park near the entrance to the Main Stand. The statue was funded by supporters and sculpted by Liverpool artist Tom Murphy.

On 3 November, assistant manager Matthew Gill left the club by mutual consent. Rovers defeated Bristol Rovers in the First Round of FA Cup thanks to a Max Power goal on 54th minute. Three days later Tranmere upheld their good cup form in the Football League Trophy with an away victory at Bury. After narrow defeats against Luton Town and Southend United, Tranmere finally achieved their first league victory under Micky Adams on 29 November against Portsmouth. The win was clouded by the serious injury of young loanee Will Aimson, who fractured both his tibia and fibula in a collision with teammate Danny Holmes. 17-year old defender Evan Gumbs made his first appearance for the senior team against Luton Town as a second-half substitute, following an injury to Josh Thompson who picked up a hamstring injury on his Tranmere debut.

=== December ===
On 6 December, Tranmere earned an FA Cup second-round home replay after a draw at Oxford United thanks to a late Jason Koumas goal. The League Trophy area semifinal ended in another 2–2 draw against League One opponents Walsall. Rovers were one shot off the victory during the penalties but Liam Ridehalgh and Marc Laird misses cost Tranmere a place in Northern section final. A Max Power strike earned Tranmere victory in the next league game at Dagenham & Redbridge to climb out of the relegation zone. FA Cup replay brought Rovers another victory and a place in the Third Round thanks to Kayode Odejayi and Max Power goals. Tranmere almost hit a third consecutive league victory versus Cambridge United, but their 10-man rivals managed to equalise in the final minutes. The unbeaten run finally came to end with an away defeat to promotion contenders Burton Albion after Liam Ridehalgh was sent off following a foul in the penalty box in the middle of the first half. The game was also notable for the second Chris Shuker debut six months after he officially ended his career. The year was ended with a 2–1 home victory against relegation rivals Northampton Town. Good December form resulted in Micky Adams being nominated League Two Manager of the Month.

=== January ===
Tranmere started 2015 with the FA Cup defeat at Premier League team Swansea City in the third round, conceding six goals.

Steve Jennings became the first signing of the winter transfer window, returning to Tranmere on a permanent basis, signing a six-month deal. He was followed by Northern Irish striker Rory Donnelly who joined on loan from Swansea City until the end of the season. At the same time, Adams announced five players as transfer listed – Antonie Boland, Eliot Richards, James Rowe, Abdulai Bell-Baggie and George Donnelly. On the next day former Tranmere defender Alan Rogers joined the Club's coaching staff. Defender Marcus Holness suffered serious knee ligament damage on 10 January that ruled him out until the end of the season. On 17 January, youth midfielder Mitch Duggan made his senior debut as a late substitute for Shamir Fenelon.

Rovers kept good league form at the end of January, defeating Accrington Stanley and Exeter City, hence losing only one league game in last nine. On-loan striker Rory Donnelly was nominated and then named Football League Two Player of the Month after scoring three goals in January. By 31 January, Tranmere climbed to 17th place, their highest since August, though above the relegation zone by only two points. Adams continued refreshing the squad by signing Canadian international striker Iain Hume, who returned to Tranmere after ten years, midfielders Rob Taylor and Lee Molyneux and defender Adam Dugdale.

=== February ===
Tranmere started February with a home loss to Carlisle United after two Charlie Wyke second half goals. Three days later Rory Donnelly scored his fourth goal for Tranmere at Newport County, but the hosts' late goal denied Rovers victory. Tranmere were defeated by relegation rivals for the second time in three matches, this time at York City after Wes Fletcher scored a goal either side of half-time. On 21 February Tranmere unexpectedly beat league leaders Shrewsbury Town 2–1 at Prenton Park as Donnelly scored his fifth goal for Rovers. On the next matchday Tranmere conceded three late goals at Portsmouth to give away a two-goal lead and lose the game. It was followed by another 0–2 defeat against close rivals Cheltenham Town.

=== March ===
Tranmere's relegation worries took another turn for the worse as they suffered a fourth straight defeat to sink back into the bottom two after the home encounter against Dagenham & Redbridge that saw Rovers back in the relegation zone. On 14 March Tranmere's loss at Northampton Town after a single Ryan Cresswell goal became their fifth straight defeat. Three days later Tranmere broke the losing run with an away victory at Cambridge City, thanks to Dan Gardner and Max Power goals. Later, Tranmere was outplayed 1–4 by Burton Albion at Prenton Park, in the game that marked the senior debut of 17-year old midfielder Ben Jago. Young loanee George Green's goal scored in the ninety-fourth minute cancelled Adebayo Akinfenwa's first half goal to earn Tranmere Rovers one point against Wimbledon to end March in the relegation zone, one point off survival.

=== April and May ===
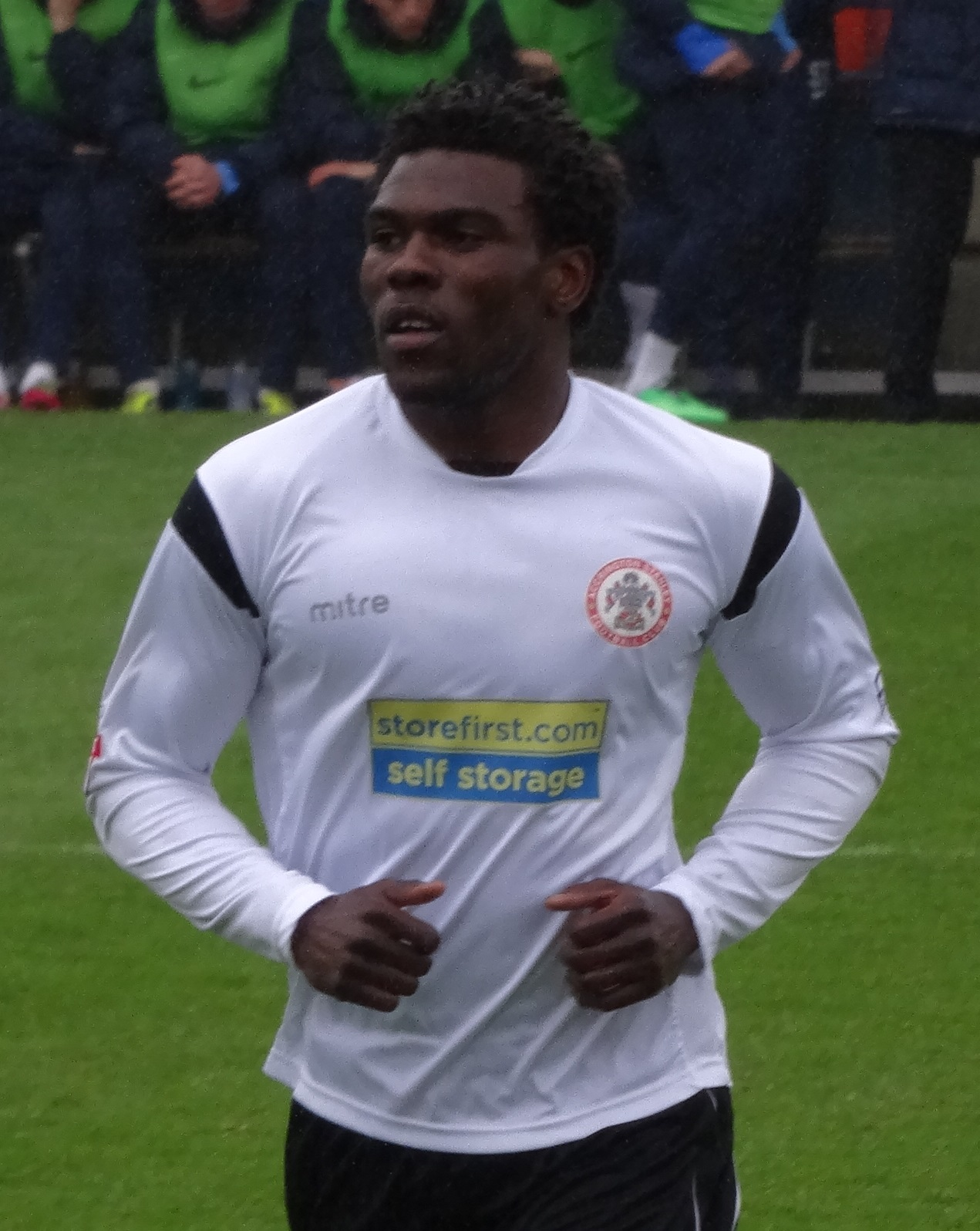
Kayode Odejayi scored the last Tranmere Rovers goal of the season.

Paired Easter games saw the second 2–2 draw of the season against Stevenage and a narrow home defeat at Luton Town. Three more back-to-back defeats followed as Rovers failed to score in each of them. Finally, on 19 April, Micky Adams left Tranmere by mutual consent. The team were bottom of the table but still had a chance to avoid relegation with the games against Plymouth Argyle and Bury to be played. Assistant manager Alan Rogers and Academy manager Shaun Garnett took temporary charge of the first team.

Max Power conceded a penalty scored by Reuben Reid early in the penultimate game of the season against Plymouth. He himself equalised the score inside the first half, but soon after Plymouth regained the lead through Tareiq Holmes-Dennis. With ten minutes remaining, the hosts doubled the lead and though Kayode Odejayi scored in the final minutes it was another Tranmere defeat. As Hartlepool United, since December led by former Tranmere Rovers manager Ronnie Moore, won their home game against Exeter City, Tranmere lost their last chance to remain in the Football League. In the final game of the season Alan Rogers gave teenager Tolani Omotola an opportunity to make his Football League debut as Bury won the game by a single Tom Soares goal, to win promotion to the League One.

== League Two ==
=== League table ===
Pos	Team	Pld	W	D	L	GF	GA	GD	Pts	Promotion, qualification or relegation
20	Carlisle United	46	14	8	24	56	74	−18	50	
21	Mansfield Town	46	13	9	24	38	62	−24	48	
22	Hartlepool United	46	12	9	25	39	70	−31	45	
23	Cheltenham Town (R)	46	9	14	23	40	67	−27	41	Relegation to the National League
24	Tranmere Rovers (R)	46	9	12	25	45	67	−22	39	Relegation to the National League

Updated to match(es) played on 23 May 2015. Source: BBC Sport
Rules for classification: 1) Points; 2) Goal difference; 3) Number of goals scored
(R) Relegated

Overall								Home						Away					
Pld	W	D	L	GF	GA	GD	Pts	W	D	L	GF	GA	GD	W	D	L	GF	GA	GD
46	9	12	25	45	67	−22	39	5	7	11	26	34	−8	4	5	14	19	33	−14

Last updated: 3 May 2015.
Source: Football League Official Site

=== Results by matchday ===
Round	1	2	3	4	5	6	7	8	9	10	11	12	13	14	15	16	17	18	19	20	21	22	23	24	25	26	27	28	29	30	31	32	33	34	35	36	37	38	39	40	41	42	43	44	45	46
Ground	H	A	A	H	H	A	A	H	H	A	A	H	A	H	A	H	A	H	H	A	H	A	H	A	H	H	A	H	A	A	H	A	A	H	H	A	A	H	H	A	H	A	A	H	A	H
Result	D	L	W	L	W	L	D	D	L	L	L	L	L	D	D	D	L	L	W	W	D	L	W	D	W	D	W	L	D	L	W	L	L	L	L	L	W	L	D	D	L	L	L	L	L	L
Position	12	17	11	15	11	15	14	15	18	20	22	24	24	24	23	23	23	23	23	22	21	23	22	23	22	21	17	21	20	22	20	20	20	22	23	23	22	22	23	23	23	23	24	24	24	24

Updated to match(es) played on 3 May 2015. Source: Statto.com
A = Away; H = Home; W = Win; D = Draw; L = Loss

=== Matches ===
9 August 2014 1	Tranmere Rovers	1–1	York City	Birkenhead
15:00	Rowe 90+4'	TRFC Report; BBC Report	Lowe 67'; Penn (yellow card) 84'	Stadium: Prenton Park; Attendance: 6,287; Referee: Kevin Johnson

16 August 2014 2	Shrewsbury Town	2–1	Tranmere Rovers	Shrewsbury
15:00	Knight-Percival (yellow card) 40'; Mangan 90'; Demetriou 90+4'	TRFC Report; BBC Report	Bell-Baggie 42'; Stockton (yellow card) 65'	Stadium: New Meadow; Attendance: 5,249; Referee: Stephen Martin

19 August 2014 3	Wycombe Wanderers	0–2	Tranmere Rovers	High Wycombe
19:45		TRFC Report; BBC Report	Stockton 19'; Ihiekwe (yellow card) 41'; Power 54'	Stadium: Adams Park; Attendance: 3,005; Referee: Brendan Malone

23 August 2014 4	Tranmere Rovers	2–3	Cheltenham Town	Birkenhead
15:00	Richards 12'; Laird 45+1'; Holmes (yellow card) 58'	TRFC Report; BBC Report	Brown (yellow card) 29'; Richards 67'; Arthur 69'; Wynter 73'; Harrison (yellow card) 58'	Stadium: Prenton Park; Attendance: 4,607; Referee: Nigel Miller

30 August 2014 5	Tranmere Rovers	2–1	Morecambe	Birkenhead
15:00	Stockton 58', 90'; Odejayi (yellow card) 64'; Power (yellow card) 90+2'; Bell-Baggie (yellow card) 90+4'	TRFC Report; BBC Report	Hughes 39' (red card) 63'; Goodall (yellow card) 55'	Stadium: Prenton Park; Attendance: 4,656; Referee: Mark Haywood

6 September 2014 6	Accrington Stanley	3–2	Tranmere Rovers	Accrington
15:00	Hunt (yellow card) 4'; Gray 8' (pen.), 79'; Naismith 82' (yellow card) 84'	TRFC Report; BBC Report	Bell-Baggie 46', 70'; Stockton (yellow card) 65'	Stadium: Crown Ground; Attendance: 2,151; Referee: Keith Hill

13 September 2014 7	Hartlepool United	0–0	Tranmere Rovers	Hartlepool
15:00	Bates (yellow card) 41'	TRFC Report; BBC Report	Gill (yellow card) 57'; Power (yellow card) 81'	Stadium: Victoria Park; Attendance: 3,245; Referee: Darren Handley

16 September 2014 8	Tranmere Rovers	0–0	Newport County	Birkenhead
19:45		TRFC Report; BBC Report	Feely (yellow card) 27'; Byrne (yellow card) 45'	Stadium: Prenton Park; Attendance: 3,948; Referee: Paul Tierney

20 September 2014 9	Tranmere Rovers	1–2	Exeter City	Birkenhead
15:00	Holmes 25'; Laird (yellow card) 87'	TRFC Report; BBC Report	Cummins 6'; Moore-Taylor 69'	Stadium: Prenton Park; Attendance: 4,725; Referee: Mick Russell

27 September 2014 10	Carlisle United	1–0	Tranmere Rovers	Carlisle
15:00	Amoo 72'; Grainger (yellow card) 74'	TRFC Report; BBC Report	Bell-Baggie (yellow card) 69'	Stadium: Brunton Park; Attendance: 3,873; Referee: Jeremy Simpson

4 October 2014 11	Bury	2–0	Tranmere Rovers	Bury
15:00	Etuhu 55'; Soares (yellow card) 58'; Nardiello 87'	TRFC Report; BBC Report	G. Donnelly (yellow card) 37'; Gill (yellow card) 48'	Stadium: Gigg Lane; Attendance: 4,481; Referee: Andy Haines

11 October 2014 12	Tranmere Rovers	0–1	Plymouth Argyle	Birkenhead
15:00	Odejayi (yellow card) 77'	TRFC Report; BBC Report	Reid 29'; Hartley (yellow card) 77'; O'Connor (yellow card) 88'	Stadium: Prenton Park; Attendance: 4,952; Referee: David Coote

18 October 2014 13	Oxford United	2–0	Tranmere Rovers	Oxford
15:00	Barnett 28'; Potter 73'	TRFC Report; BBC Report	Donacien (yellow card) 41'; G. Donnelly (yellow card) 56'; Holmes (yellow card) 63'	Stadium: Kassam Stadium; Attendance: 4,748; Referee: Kevin Johnson

21 October 2014 14	Tranmere Rovers	0–0	Mansfield Town	Birkenhead
19:45	Gnanduillet (yellow card) 14'	TRFC Report; BBC Report	Sendles-White (yellow card) 90+4'	Stadium: Prenton Park; Attendance: 4,092; Referee: Tony Harrington

25 October 2014 15	AFC Wimbledon	2–2	Tranmere Rovers	Kingston upon Thames
15:00	Smith 16'; Akinfenwa 44'	TRFC Report; BBC Report	Gnanduillet 20', 65'	Stadium: Kingsmeadow; Attendance: 4,195; Referee: Andy D'Urso

1 November 2014 16	Tranmere Rovers	2–2	Stevenage	Birkenhead
15:00	Jennings (yellow card) 45' (goal) 66'; Gnanduillet (yellow card) 82'; Ihiekwe 90+6'	TRFC Report; BBC Report	Ihiekwe 14' (o.g.); Whelpdale (yellow card) 19'; Barnard 64' (yellow card) 90+5'; Wells (yellow card) 82'	Stadium: Prenton Park; Attendance: 5,456; Referee: Seb Stockbridge

15 November 2014 17	Luton Town	1–0	Tranmere Rovers	Luton
15:00	Miller 70'; Benson (yellow card) 85'	TRFC Report; BBC Report	Power (yellow card) 90+2'	Stadium: Kenilworth Road; Attendance: 9,061; Referee: Lee Collins

22 November 2014 18	Tranmere Rovers	1–2	Southend United	Birkenhead
15:00	Power 53' (pen.); Aimson (yellow card) 75'	TRFC Report; BBC Report	Payne 16'; Aimson 23' (o.g.); Bolger (yellow card) 53'; Timlin (yellow card) 62'; Corr (yellow card) 75'	Stadium: Prenton Park; Attendance: 4,621; Referee: Carl Berry

29 November 2014 19	Tranmere Rovers	3–1	Portsmouth	Birkenhead
15:00	Fenelon 2'; Jennings (yellow card) 53'; Rowe 68'; Power 78'	TRFC Report; BBC Report	Wallace 57' (yellow card) 77'	Stadium: Prenton Park; Attendance: 5,163; Referee: Carl Boyeson

13 December 2014 20	Dagenham & Redbridge	0–1	Tranmere Rovers	Dagenham
15:00	Batt (yellow card) 3'	TRFC Report; BBC Report	Ridehalgh (yellow card) 26'; Laird (yellow card) 45+1'; Ihiekwe (yellow card) 51'; Power 74'; Jennings (yellow card) 76'	Stadium: Victoria Road; Attendance: 1,840; Referee: Graham Scott

19 December 2014 21	Tranmere Rovers	1–1	Cambridge United	Birkenhead
19:45	Donacien (yellow card) 29'; Laird (yellow card) 63'; Stockton 74'	TRFC Report; BBC Report	Simpson (yellow card) 41' (yellow-red card) 76'; Nelson 89'	Stadium: Prenton Park; Attendance: 4,578; Referee: Darren Handley

26 December 2014 22	Burton Albion	2–0	Tranmere Rovers	Burton upon Trent
15:00	McCrory 23' (pen.); Cansdell-Sherriff 38'; Blyth (yellow card) 88'	TRFC Report; BBC Report	Ridehalgh (red card) 23'	Stadium: Pirelli Stadium; Attendance: 4,206; Referee: Keith Hill

28 December 2014 23	Tranmere Rovers	2–1	Northampton Town	Birkenhead
15:00	Odejayi 32'; Kirby 63'	TRFC Report; BBC Report	Richards 44'; Horwood (yellow card) 83'; O'Toole (yellow card) 90+5'	Stadium: Prenton Park; Attendance: 5,394; Referee: Andy Haines

10 January 2015 24	Morecambe	0–0	Tranmere Rovers	Morecambe
15:00	Devitt (yellow card) 53'	TRFC Report; BBC Report		Stadium: Globe Arena; Attendance: 2,232; Referee: Eddie Ilderton

17 January 2015 25	Tranmere Rovers	3–0	Accrington Stanley	Birkenhead
15:00	R. Donnelly 12', 57'; Fenelon 23'	TRFC Report; BBC Report	Aldred (yellow card) 27'	Stadium: Prenton Park; Attendance: 4,872; Referee: Gary Sutton

24 January 2015 26	Tranmere Rovers	1–1	Hartlepool United	Birkenhead
15:00	Odejayi 12'; Fenelon (yellow card) 42'	TRFC Report; BBC Report	Fenwick 14'	Stadium: Prenton Park; Attendance: 5,488; Referee: Geoff Eltringham

31 January 2015 27	Exeter City	1–2	Tranmere Rovers	Exeter
15:00	Nicholls 37'; Sercombe (yellow card) 86'	TRFC Report; BBC Report	Thompson (yellow card) 9'; Myrie-Williams 29'; R. Donnelly 50' (yellow card) 79'	Stadium: St James Park; Attendance: 4,044; Referee: Lee Collins

7 February 2015 28	Tranmere Rovers	0–2	Carlisle United	Birkenhead
15:00	Myrie-Williams (yellow card) 88'; Williams (yellow card) 90+1'; R. Donnelly (yellow card) 90+6'	TRFC Report; BBC Report	Wyke 65', 69'; Sweeney (yellow card) 78'; Dempsey (yellow card) 90+2' (yellow-red card) 90+6'; Meppen-Walter (yellow card) 90+7'	Stadium: Prenton Park; Attendance: 5,358; Referee: Scott Duncan

10 February 2015 29	Newport County	1–1	Tranmere Rovers	Newport, Wales
19:45	Sandell (yellow card) 53'; Byrne 83'	TRFC Report; BBC Report	Jennings (yellow card) 44'; R. Donnelly 45+7'; Holmes (yellow card) 75'	Stadium: Rodney Parade; Attendance: 2,327; Referee: Rob Lewis

14 February 2015 30	York City	2–0	Tranmere Rovers	York
15:00	Fletcher 20' 58'; Coulson (yellow card) 50'	TRFC Report; BBC Report	Holmes (yellow card) 28'; Dugdale (yellow card) 48'	Stadium: Bootham Crescent; Attendance: 3,714; Referee: Richard Clark

21 February 2015 31	Tranmere Rovers	2–1	Shrewsbury Town	Birkenhead
15:00	R. Donnelly 29'; Holmes 32'; Williams (yellow card) 90+5'	TRFC Report; BBC Report	Goldson 82'	Stadium: Prenton Park; Attendance: 5,987; Referee: Mark Brown

24 February 2015 32	Portsmouth	3–2	Tranmere Rovers	Portsmouth
19:45	Dunne (yellow card) 32'; Westcarr 76'; Taylor 82', 85'; Tubbs (yellow card) 90'	TRFC Report; BBC Report	Myrie-Williams 28'; Laird (yellow card) 35'; Odejayi 50'	Stadium: Fratton Park; Attendance: 13,660; Referee: Iain Williamson

28 February 2015 33	Cheltenham Town	2–0	Tranmere Rovers	Cheltenham
15:00	Holmes 9' (o.g.); Brown 61' (yellow card) 64'; Burns (yellow card) 66'	TRFC Report; BBC Report	Myrie-Williams (yellow card) 20'; Odejayi (yellow card) 29'; Holmes (yellow card) 59'	Stadium: Whaddon Road; Attendance: 3,070; Referee: Michael Bull

3 March 2015 34	Tranmere Rovers	1–2	Wycombe Wanderers	Birkenhead
19:45	Dugdale (yellow card) 19' (goal) 32'; Hugill (yellow card) 37'; Odejayi (yellow card) 70'; Ihiekwe (yellow card) 90'	TRFC Report; BBC Report	Hayes 26' (pen.); Onyedinma 40'; McClure (red card) 69'	Stadium: Prenton Park; Attendance: 4,161; Referee: Mark Heywood

7 March 2015 35	Tranmere Rovers	2–3	Dagenham & Redbridge	Birkenhead
15:00	Gardner 43'; Power 87'; Odejayi (yellow card) 90'	TRFC Report; BBC Report	Widdowson (yellow card) 36'; Cureton 40'; Hemmings 50'; Bingham 54'; Batt (yellow card) 90'; Obileye (yellow card) 90'	Stadium: Prenton Park; Attendance: 4,762; Referee: Jeremy Simpson

14 March 2015 36	Northampton Town	1–0	Tranmere Rovers	Northampton
15:00	Carter (yellow card) 61'; Cresswell 62'	TRFC Report; BBC Report	Ihiekwe (yellow card) 61'; Myrie-Williams (yellow card) 61'	Stadium: Sixfields Stadium; Attendance: 4,428; Referee: Graham Salisbury

17 March 2015 37	Cambridge United	1–2	Tranmere Rovers	Cambridge
19:45	Kaikai 63'	TRFC Report; BBC Report	Jennings (yellow card) 29' (yellow-red card) 79'; Power 45'; Laird (yellow card) 50'; Gardner 58' (yellow card) 59'; Myrie-Williams (yellow card) 83'	Stadium: Abbey Stadium; Attendance: 4,202; Referee: Keith Stroud

21 March 2015 38	Tranmere Rovers	1–4	Burton Albion	Birkenhead
15:00	Odejayi 35'; Ihiekwe (yellow card) 76'; Molyneux (yellow card) 79'; Dugdale (yellow card) 90'	TRFC Report; BBC Report	McCrory 18'; Akins 22'; Mousinho (yellow card) 57'; El Khayati 72'; Dugdale 89' (o.g.)	Stadium: Prenton Park; Attendance: 5,390; Referee: Tim Robinson

28 March 2015 39	Tranmere Rovers	1–1	AFC Wimbledon	Birkenhead
15:00	R. Donnelly (yellow card) 63'; Green 90+4' (yellow card) 90+5'; Hume (yellow card) 90+6'	TRFC Report; BBC Report	Akinfenwa 29' (yellow card) 71'; Rigg (yellow card) 52'; Goodman (yellow card) 76'; Moore (yellow card) 89'	Stadium: Prenton Park; Attendance: 5,592; Referee: Andy Woolmer

3 April 2015 40	Stevenage	2–2	Tranmere Rovers	Stevenage
15:00	Dembélé 4'; Keane (yellow card) 72'; Lee 78'; Conlon (yellow card) 87'	TRFC Report; BBC Report	Myrie-Williams 37'; Odejayi 45+1' (yellow card) 90+2'; Dugdale (yellow card) 47'; Molyneux (yellow card) 75'; Power (yellow card) 90+5'	Stadium: Broadhall Way; Attendance: 3,344; Referee: Trevor Kettle

6 April 2015 41	Tranmere Rovers	0–1	Luton Town	Birkenhead
15:00		TRFC Report; BBC Report	McNulty (yellow card) 58'; McGeehan (yellow card) 76' (goal) 81'	Stadium: Prenton Park; Attendance: 6,035; Referee: Dean Whitestone

11 April 2015 42	Southend United	1–0	Tranmere Rovers	Southend-on-Sea
15:00	Corr 38'; Bolger (yellow card) 60'	TRFC Report; BBC Report	Jennings (yellow card) 42'; Donacien (yellow card) 76'; R. Donnelly (yellow card) 84'	Stadium: Roots Hall; Attendance: 5,846; Referee: Graham Horwood

14 April 2015 43	Mansfield Town	1–0	Tranmere Rovers	Mansfield
19:45	Lambe 44' (yellow card) 86' (yellow-red card); Tafazolli (yellow card) 66'; Oliver (yellow card) 90+8'	TRFC Report; BBC Report	Green (yellow card) 20'; Hill (yellow card) 90+5'; Power (yellow card) 90+5'; Williams (yellow card) 90+7'	Stadium: Field Mill; Attendance: 3,051; Referee: Darren Drysdale

18 April 2015 44	Tranmere Rovers	0–3	Oxford United	Birkenhead
15:00		TRFC Report; BBC Report	Roofe 51' 68'; Rose 52'; Skarz (yellow card) 83'	Stadium: Prenton Park; Attendance: 5,777; Referee: Andy Madley

25 April 2015 45	Plymouth Argyle	3–2	Tranmere Rovers	Plymouth
15:00	Reid 7' (pen.); Holmes-Dennis 37'; O'Connor (yellow card) 75'; Alessandra 81'	TRFC Report; BBC Report	Dugdale (yellow card) 18'; Power 34' (yellow card) 85'; Ihiekwe (yellow card) 83'; Odejayi 89'	Stadium: Home Park; Attendance: 9,769; Referee: Gavin Ward

2 May 2015 46	Tranmere Rovers	0–1	Bury	Birkenhead
15:00	Power (yellow card) 15'; Koumas (yellow card) 45+2'; Jennings (yellow card) 80'	TRFC Report; BBC Report	El-Abd (yellow card) 34'; Soares 61'; Nardiello (yellow card) 88'	Stadium: Prenton Park; Attendance: 7,518; Referee: Simon Hooper

== FA Cup ==
8 November 2014 First round	Tranmere Rovers	1–0	Bristol Rovers (5)	Birkenhead
15:00	Jennings (yellow card) 40'; Power 54' (pen.); G. Donnelly (red card) 62'	TRFC Report; BBC Report		Stadium: Prenton Park; Attendance: 3,559; Referee: Darren England

6 December 2014 Second round	Oxford United (4)	2–2	Tranmere Rovers	Oxford
15:00	Barnett 59', 64'	TRFC Report; BBC Report	Stockton 33'; Koumas 76'	Stadium: Kassam Stadium; Attendance: 4,681; Referee: Mark Haywood

16 December 2014 Replay	Tranmere Rovers	2–1	Oxford United (4)	Birkenhead
19:45	Odejayi 36'; Power 76'; Ihiekwe (yellow card) 80'	TRFC Report; BBC Report	Potter 29'; Collins (yellow card) 32'; Wright (yellow card) 62'; Hylton (yellow card) 83'	Stadium: Prenton Park; Attendance: 3,296; Referee: Mick Russell

3 January 2015 Third round	Tranmere Rovers	2–6	Swansea City (1)	Birkenhead
15:00	Holmes (yellow card) 16'; Power (yellow card) 64' (goal) 70'; Stockton 83'	TRFC Report; BBC Report	Dyer 34'; Fulton (yellow card) 45'; Carroll 49'; Barrow 58' (yellow card) 72'; Gomis 77', 90+4'; Bartley (yellow card) 82'; Routledge 85'; Tiendalli (yellow card) 90'	Stadium: Prenton Park; Attendance: 10,007; Referee: Paul Tierney

== Football League Cup ==
12 August 2014 First round	Tranmere Rovers	0–1	Nottingham Forest (2)	Birkenhead
19:45		TRFC Report; BBC Report	Antonio 12'; Mancienne (yellow card) 44' (yellow-red card) 51'	Stadium: Prenton Park; Attendance: 4,374; Referee: David Webb

== Football League Trophy ==
7 October 2014 Second round	Tranmere Rovers	1–1 (5–4 p)	Carlisle United (4)	Birkenhead
19:45	Power 40'	TRFC Report; BBC Report	White (yellow card) 13'; Potts 76'	Stadium: Prenton Park; Attendance: 2,056; Referee: Richard Clark
	Penalties
	Power (penalty scored); Koumas (penalty scored); Richards (penalty scored); Ihiekwe (penalty scored); Holmes (penalty missed); Ben Davies (penalty scored)		Dicker (penalty scored); Potts (penalty scored); Rigg (penalty missed); Beck (penalty scored); Symington (penalty scored); Brough (penalty missed)

11 November 2014 Third round	Bury (4)	1–2	Tranmere Rovers	Bury
19:45	Cameron 35'	TRFC Report; BBC Report	Power 43'; Johnson 45'	Stadium: Gigg Lane; Attendance: 1,842; Referee: Oliver Langford

10 December 2014 Area semi-final	Tranmere Rovers	2–2 (4–5 p)	Walsall (3)	Birkenhead
19:45	Power 37'; Odejayi 43'	TRFC Report; BBC Report	Forde 63'; Cain 80'	Stadium: Prenton Park; Attendance: 2,355; Referee: Geoff Eltringham
	Penalties
	Power (penalty scored); Holmes (penalty scored); Ihiekwe (penalty scored); Jennings (penalty scored); Ridehalgh (penalty missed); Laird (penalty missed)		Bradshaw (penalty scored); Sawyers (penalty scored); Grimes (penalty missed); Forde (penalty scored); Manset (penalty scored); Downing (penalty scored)

== Players ==
Transfers, contract extensions and loans are listed from the last day of the previous season till the final day of this season

=== Transfers ===
In
Date	Player	Age	Previous club	Ends	Fee
28 May 2014	(Wales) Eliot Richards	22	Bristol Rovers	1 July 2016	Free
29 May 2014	(England) Matthew Gill	33	Bristol Rovers	1 July 2015	Free
18 June 2014	(England) Michael Ihiekwe	21	Wolverhampton Wanderers	1 July 2016	Free
25 June 2014	(Nigeria) Kayode Odejayi	32	Rotherham United	1 July 2015	Free
27 June 2014	(England) Marcus Holness	25	Burton Albion	1 July 2016	Free
10 July 2014	(Scotland) Marc Laird	28	Southend United	1 July 2015	Free
28 July 2014	(England) Danny Woodards	30	Bristol Rovers	1 January 2015	Free
4 August 2014	(England) Clayton McDonald	25	Grimsby Town	non-contract	Free
8 August 2014	(Spain) Gerardo Bruna	23	Huesca	8 September 2014	Free
8 August 2014	(England) Matt Hill	33	Sheffield United	non-contract	Free
1 September 2014	(England) George Donnelly	26	Rochdale	1 July 2016	Undisclosed
1 September 2014	(Slovakia) Peter Brezovan	34	Portsmouth	1 July 2015	Free
19 November 2014	(Cameroon) Guy Madjo	30	Looktabfah	19 January 2015	Free
8 January 2015	(England) Steve Jennings	30	Port Vale	1 July 2015	Free
13 January 2015	(England) Rob Taylor	29	Mansfield Town	1 July 2015	Undisclosed
13 January 2015	(England) Lee Molyneux	25	Crewe Alexandra	1 July 2015	Free
28 January 2015	(England) Adam Dugdale	27	Crewe Alexandra	1 July 2015	Free
28 January 2015	(England) Josh Thompson	23	Colchester United	1 July 2015	Free
29 January 2015	(Canada) Iain Hume	31	Kerala Blasters	1 July 2015	Free

Out
Date	Player	Age	Status	Next club	Fee
6 May 2014	(France) Jean-Louis Akpa Akpro	29	Released	Shrewsbury Town	Free
6 May 2014	(Jamaica) Ian Goodison	42	Released	Harbour View	Free
6 May 2014	(Republic of Ireland) Callum Morris	21	Released	Chester	Free
19 May 2014	(England) Ryan Lowe	35	Transfer	Bury	Undisclosed
28 May 2014	(Wales) Ash Taylor	23	Transfer	Aberdeen	Free
29 May 2014	(Northern Ireland) Jason Mooney	25	Transfer	York City	Free
13 June 2014	(England) James Wallace	22	Transfer	Sheffield United	Undisclosed
1 July 2014	(England) Evan Horwood	28	Released	Northampton Town	Free
18 July 2014	(England) Steve Jennings	29	Transfer	Port Vale	Free
6 August 2014	(England) Joe Thompson	25	Transfer	Bury	Free
4 September 2014	(Spain) Gerardo Bruna	23	Released	Whitehawk	Free
3 November 2014	(England) Matthew Gill	33	Released	Retired	Free
8 January 2015	(England) Danny Woodards	31	Released	Boreham Wood	Free
8 January 2015	(Cameroon) Guy Madjo	30	Released	Retired	Free
23 January 2015	(England) Antonie Boland	20	Released	Stalybridge Celtic	Free
2 February 2015	(Wales) Eliot Richards	23	Released	Cheltenham Town	Free
2 February 2015	(England) James Rowe	23	Released	Cheltenham Town	Free
2 February 2015	(Sierra Leone) Abdulai Bell-Baggie	22	Released	Bristol Rovers	Free

=== Contract extensions ===
Date	Player	Age	Ends
16 May 2014	(England) Sam Ramsbottom	18	1 July 2015
16 May 2014	(England) Liam Davies	17	1 July 2015
23 May 2014	(Wales) Jason Koumas	34	1 July 2015
26 May 2014	(England) Jake Kirby	20	1 July 2017
26 August 2014	(England) Cole Stockton	20	1 July 2017
1 September 2014	(England) Matt Hill	33	1 July 2015

=== Loans ===
In
Player	Age	Signed from	Date	
Player	Age	Signed from	Started	Ended
(Saint Lucia) Janoi Donacien	20	Aston Villa	18 August	10 January
(England) Matthias Fanimo	20	West Ham United	11 September	9 October
(England) Ben Davies	19	Preston North End	19 September	22 October
(England) George Barker	23	Swindon Town	10 October	3 November
(Ivory Coast) Armand Gnanduillet	22	Chesterfield	20 October	17 November
(England) Danny Johnson	21	Cardiff City	21 October	17 November
(England) Josh Thompson	23	Colchester United	24 October	28 January
(England) Steve Jennings	29	Port Vale	27 October	8 January
(England) Will Aimson	20	Hull City	20 November	1 December
(Antigua and Barbuda) Calaum Jahraldo-Martin	21	Hull City	20 November	1 January
(England) Shamir Fenelon	21	Brighton & Hove Albion	21 November	3 February
(Northern Ireland) Rory Donnelly	22	Swansea City	8 January	end of the season
(England) Jennison Myrie-Williams	26	Scunthorpe United	20 January	end of the season
(England) Harrison McGahey	19	Sheffield United	13 February	16 March
(England) Jordan Hugill	22	Preston North End	26 February	25 March
(England) Dan Gardner	24	Chesterfield	3 March	3 April
(Saint Lucia) Janoi Donacien	21	Aston Villa	7 March	end of the season
(England) George Green	19	Everton	26 March	end of the season

Out
Player	Age	Signed to	Date	
Player	Age	Signed to	Started	Ended
(England) Antonie Boland	19	Cefn Druids	22 August	1 January
(England) Sam Ramsbottom	18	Witton Albion	16 September	15 October
(Slovakia) Peter Brezovan	35	Southport	27 February	27 March
(England) George Donnelly	26	Southport	27 February	end of the season

=== Season statistics ===
No.	Nat	Player	Total		League Two		FA Cup		League Cup		League Trophy		Discipline		Signed^{†}		
No.	Nat	Player	A	G	A	G	A	G	A	G	A	G	Booked	Sent off (straight red)	Status	Joined	Left
Goalkeepers
1	(Wales)	Owain Fôn Williams	44+0	–	38+0	–	4+0	–	1+0	–	1+0	–	3	–	–	–	–
13	(England)	Luke Pilling	–	–	–	–	–	–	–	–	–	–	–	–	youth	–	–
20	(England)	Sam Ramsbottom	–	–	–	–	–	–	–	–	–	–	–	–	–	–	–
26	(Slovakia)	Peter Brezovan	10+0	–	8+0	–	–	–	–	–	2+0	–	–	–	–	01.09	–
Defenders
2	(England)	Danny Holmes	40+3	2	33+3	2	3+0	–	1+0	–	3+0	–	6	–	–	–	–
3	(England)	Liam Ridehalgh	18+5	–	13+5	–	3+0	–	–	–	2+0	–	1	1	–	–	–
5	(England)	Michael Ihiekwe	45+1	1	37+1	1	4+0	–	1+0	–	3+0	–	7	–	–	–	–
6	(England)	Marcus Holness	22+2	–	15+2	–	4+0	–	–	–	3+0	–	–	–	–	–	–
17	(England)	Danny Woodards	5+1	–	4+1	–	–	–	1+0	–	–	–	–	–	–	–	08.01
18	(England)	Adam Dugdale	15+1	1	15+1	1	–	–	–	–	–	–	5	–	–	28.01	–
18	(England)	Antonie Boland	–	–	–	–	–	–	–	–	–	–	–	–	–	–	23.01
19	(England)	Clayton McDonald	0+1	–	0+1	–	–	–	–	–	–	–	–	–	non-contract	–	18.08
19; 12	(Saint Lucia)	Janoi Donacien	37+0	–	31+0	–	4+0	–	–	–	2+0	–	3	–	loan loan	18.08; 07.03	10.01 –
24	(England)	Evan Gumbs	0+1	–	0+1	–	–	–	–	–	–	–	–	–	youth	–	–
25	(England)	Matt Hill	10+2	–	9+2	–	–	–	1+0	–	–	–	1	–	–	–	–
28	(England)	Ben Davies	3+1	–	3+0	–	–	–	–	–	0+1	–	–	–	loan	19.09	22.10
28	(England)	Harrison McGahey	2+2	–	2+2	–	–	–	–	–	–	–	–	–	loan	13.02	16.03
29	(England)	Will Aimson	2+0	–	2+0	–	–	–	–	–	–	–	1	–	loan	20.11	01.12
32	(England)	Josh Thompson	18+0	–	15+0	–	2+0	–	–	–	1+0	–	1	–	loan / –	24.10	–
Midfielders
4	(England)	Max Power	52+1	13	45+0	7	4+0	3	0+1	–	3+0	3	8	–	–	–	–
8	(Wales)	Jason Koumas	10+13	1	8+12	–	0+1	1	1+0	–	1+0	–	1	–	–	–	–
10	(England)	George Green	5+1	1	5+1	1	–	–	–	–	–	–	2	–	loan	26.03	–
11	(Sierra Leone)	Abdulai Bell-Baggie	11+5	3	8+4	3	0+1	–	1+0	–	2+0	–	2	–	–	–	02.02
11	(England)	Dan Gardner	2+2	2	2+2	2	–	–	–	–	–	–	1	–	loan	03.03	03.04
12	(England)	James Rowe	7+5	2	3+4	2	1+1	–	1+0	–	2+0	–	–	–	–	–	02.02
14	(Scotland)	Marc Laird	29+10	1	27+7	1	2+1	–	–	–	0+2	–	5	–	–	–	–
15	(England)	Jake Kirby	7+13	1	7+10	1	0+1	–	–	–	0+2	–	–	–	–	–	–
17	(England)	Rob Taylor	15+0	–	15+0	–	–	–	–	–	–	–	–	–	–	13.01	–
19	(England)	Lee Molyneux	7+4	–	7+4	–	–	–	–	–	–	–	2	–	–	13.01	–
22	(Spain)	Gerardo Bruna	0+1	–	–	–	–	–	0+1	–	–	–	–	–	–	–	04.09
22	(England)	Matthias Fanimo	0+1	–	0+1	–	–	–	–	–	–	–	–	–	loan	11.09	06.10
22	(England)	Steve Jennings	36+0	1	30+0	1	4+0	–	–	–	2+0	–	9	1	loan / –	27.10	–
23	(England)	Matthew Gill	10+0	–	8+0	–	–	–	1+0	–	1+0	–	2	–	–	–	03.11
23	(England)	Chris Shuker	1+2	–	1+2	–	–	–	–	–	–	–	–	–	–	18.12	–
27	(England)	Mitch Duggan	0+1	–	0+1	–	–	–	–	–	–	–	–	–	youth	–	–
30	(England)	Ben Jago	0+2	–	0+2	–	–	–	–	–	–	–	–	–	youth	–	–
31	(England)	Jennison Myrie-Williams	16+2	3	16+2	3	–	–	–	–	–	–	4	–	loan	20.01	–
Forwards
7	(England)	George Donnelly	5+8	–	4+7	–	1+0	–	–	–	0+1	–	2	1	–	01.09	
9	(Nigeria)	Kayode Odejayi	31+16	8	27+13	6	1+2	1	1+0	–	2+1	1	6	–	–	–	–
10	(Wales)	Eliot Richards	12+4	1	9+4	1	1+0	–	1+0	–	1+0	–	–	–	–	–	02.02
10	(England)	Jordan Hugill	4+2	–	4+2	–	–	–	–	–	–	–	1	–	loan	26.02	25.03
16	(England)	Cole Stockton	19+8	6	15+7	4	3+0	2	0+1	–	1+0	–	2	–	–	–	–
21	(England)	Liam Davies	–	–	–	–	–	–	–	–	–	–	–	–	–	–	–
28	(England)	Shamir Fenelon	11+2	2	9+1	2	2+1	–	–	–	–	–	1	–	loan	21.11	03.02
29	(England)	George Barker	4+0	–	4+0	–	–	–	–	–	–	–	–	–	loan	10.10	03.11
29	(Northern Ireland)	Rory Donnelly	15+5	5	15+5	5	–	–	–	–	–	–	4	–	loan	08.01	–
30	(Ivory Coast)	Armand Gnanduillet	4+0	2	4+0	2	–	–	–	–	–	–	2	–	loan	20.10	17.11
30	(Antigua and Barbuda)	Calaum Jahraldo-Martin	2+2	–	1+1	–	1+1	–	–	–	–	–	–	–	loan	20.11	01.01
31	(England)	Danny Johnson	5+0	1	4+0	–	–	–	–	–	1+0	1	–	–	loan	21.10	17.11
33	(Cameroon)	Guy Madjo	0+3	–	0+2	–	0+1	–	–	–	–	–	–	–	–	19.11	08.01
34	(Canada)	Iain Hume	3+9	–	3+9	–	–	–	–	–	–	–	1	–	–	29.01	–
37	(England)	Tolani Omotola	0+1	–	0+1	–	–	–	–	–	–	–	–	–	youth	–	–
		Total	54	57	46	45	4	7	1	0	3	5	84	3			

^{†} Statuses are mentioned for youth academy players without senior contract and players who were signed on non-contract basis or on loan. Dates joined and left are mentioned only for players who changed club between the first and the last matchday of the season.

Last updated: 3 May 2015.
Source: 11v11.com
