= Tolani (name) =

Nigerian given name

Motolani
- Gender: Unisex
- Language: Yoruba

Origin
- Origin: Yoruba
- Meaning: "I am sufficient to have wealth"
- Region of origin: South-west Nigeria

Other names
- Variant form: Tolani

Tolani commonly known as "Motolani" is a unisex name of Yoruba origin, predominantly used among the Yoruba people in southwestern Nigeria. It combines the Yoruba words "mo" meaning "I", "to" meaning "sufficient for", "ọla" meaning "wealth", and "ni" meaning "have", translating to "I am sufficient to have wealth." Morphologically written as "mo-tó-ọlá-ní," it is sometimes a shortened form of Omotolani or Oluwatolani. and its diminutive forms are 'Tola', 'Tolani', or 'Omotola'

== Notable people with the name ==
- Tolani Asuni(1924 –2011) Nigerian psychiatrist.
- Tolani Omotola born as Omotolani(born 1998) German footballer.
- Omotola Jalade Ekeinde, Nigerian Actress, born 1978
