= Tolani =

Tolani may refer to:

listen

== People ==
- Tolani Asuni, Nigerian psychiatrist
- Tolani Omotola, German footballer
- Sindhu Tolani, an India actress

== Places ==
- Tolani Lake, Arizona, a CDP in Coconino County, Arizona

== Institutes ==
- Tolani Maritime Institute, a maritime college in Induri, Pune, Maharashtra, India.
- Tolani College of Commerce, a commerce college in Andheri East, Mumbai, India.
