= Ben Jago =

English footballer

Personal information
- Date of birth: 4 September 1996 (age 30)
- Place of birth: Widnes, England
- Position: Midfielder

Youth career
- Tranmere Rovers

Senior career*
Years	Team	Apps	(Gls)
2015–2016	Tranmere Rovers	2	(0)
2015	→ Hyde United (loan)	16	(0)
2016	→ Annan Athletic (loan)	13	(1)
2016–2017	Llandudno	9	(0)
2017–2018	Radcliffe		
- * Club domestic league appearances and goals as of 07:34, 1 May 2017 (UTC)

Ben Jago (born 4 September 1996) is an English footballer.

== Career ==
Jago was first included in a Tranmere matchday squad on 10 January 2015, remaining an unused substitute for their goalless League Two draw away to Morecambe at the Globe Arena. After two further games remaining on the bench, he made his professional debut at Prenton Park on 21 March, replacing Marc Laird for the final 13 minutes of a 1–4 home defeat against Burton Albion. His second game was against Bury on 2 May, Tranmere's final match of a 94-year tenure in The Football League. He came on in the final minute for Iain Hume in the 0–1 home defeat.

On 19 June Jago along with three other youth system products signed his first professional one-year contract.

On 3 August Jago joined Northern Premier League side Hyde United on loan until 31 December.

On 30 January 2016, Jago scored on his debut for Annan Athletic in Scottish League Two, replacing Ryan McStay in the 65th minute and heading the final goal of a 4–2 win over Elgin City at the Galabank. On his first start two weeks later, he received a straight red card at the end of a 3–3 draw against Montrose for fouling Ross Campbell. Jago was released by Tranmere Rovers on 3 May 2016. He scored on trial for Southport in a friendly draw against Bury in July.

In August 2016, Jago joined Welsh Premier League side Llandudno. After not getting a first-team place, he left for Skelmersdale United of the Northern Premier League before returning in December.

== Statistics ==
As of match played 19 December 2015.

Club	Season	League			FA Cup		League Cup		Other		Total	
Club	Season	Division	Apps	Goals	Apps	Goals	Apps	Goals	Apps	Goals	Apps	Goals
Tranmere Rovers	2014–15	League Two	2	0	—		—		—		2	0
Tranmere Rovers	2015–16	National League	0	0	0	0	0	0	0	0	0	0
Hyde United (loan)	2015–16	Northern Premier League	16	0	0	0	0	0	6	0	22	0
Career total			18	0	0	0	0	0	6	0	24	0
