= Evan Gumbs =

English footballer

Personal information
- Full name: Evan Gumbs
- Date of birth: 21 July 1997 (age 29)
- Place of birth: Runcorn, England
- Height: 1.77 m (5 ft 10 in)
- Position: Defender

Team information
- Current team: Warrington Town

Youth career
- 2010–2014: Tranmere Rovers

Senior career*
Years	Team	Apps	(Gls)
2014–2020	Tranmere Rovers	7	(0)
2015	→ Burscough (loan)	3	(0)
2015	→ Trafford (loan)	11	(1)
2015–2016	→ Salford City (loan)	23	(1)
2016	→ Bradford Park Avenue (loan)	4	(0)
2016–2017	→ Warrington Town (loan)	11	(0)
2017	→ Warrington Town (loan)		
2020–	Warrington Town	8	(1)
2021	→ Flint Town United (loan)	14	(0)
2021	→ Runcorn Linnets (loan)	6	(0)
- * Club domestic league appearances and goals as of 21:58, 7 January 2022 (UTC)

Evan Gumbs (born 21 July 1997) is an English professional footballer who plays as a defender for Warrington Town. He is also a teacher at the school Ormiston Chadwick Academy in Widnes

== Career ==
Gumbs joined Tranmere Rovers's youth setup in 2010, after failed trials at Everton and Liverpool. On 15 November 2014 he made his professional debut, playing the last 18 minutes in a 0–1 away loss against Luton Town in a League Two fixture.

On 19 June 2015, Gumbs along with three other youth system products signed his first professional one-year contract.

On 13 August 2015 Gumbs joined Northern Premier League side Burscough on a one-month youth loan. Following his return to Tranmere he twice has been an unused substitute before joining on loan another Northern Premier League side Trafford on 12 October. Initial one-month loan was extended for another month.

On 7 August 2020 Gumbs joined Northern Premier League side Warrington Town on a permanent basis, after his release from parent club Tranmere Rovers.

In February 2021, Gumbs joined Cymru Premier club Flint Town United. In October 2021, he was sent out on loan to Northern Premier League Division One West side Runcorn Linnets on loan in order to gain some match fitness following a knee injury. He went on to make nine appearances in all competitions.

== Statistics ==
As of match played 16 April 2016.

Appearances and goals by club, season and competition
Club	Season	League			FA Cup		League Cup		Other		Total	
Club	Season	Division	Apps	Goals	Apps	Goals	Apps	Goals	Apps	Goals	Apps	Goals
Tranmere Rovers	2014–15	League Two	1	0	0	0	0	0	0	0	1	0
Tranmere Rovers	2015–16	National League	0	0	0	0	—		0	0	0	0
Burscough (loan)	2015–16	Northern Premier League	3	0	0	0	—		2	0	5	0
Trafford (loan)	2015–16	Northern Premier League	11	0	0	0	—		3	1	14	1
Salford City (loan)	2015–16	Northern Premier League	23	1	0	0	—		0	0	23	1
Tranmere Rovers	2016–17	National League	1	0	0	0	—		0	0	1	0
Career total			39	1	0	0	0	0	5	1	44	2
