= Danny Holmes =

English footballer

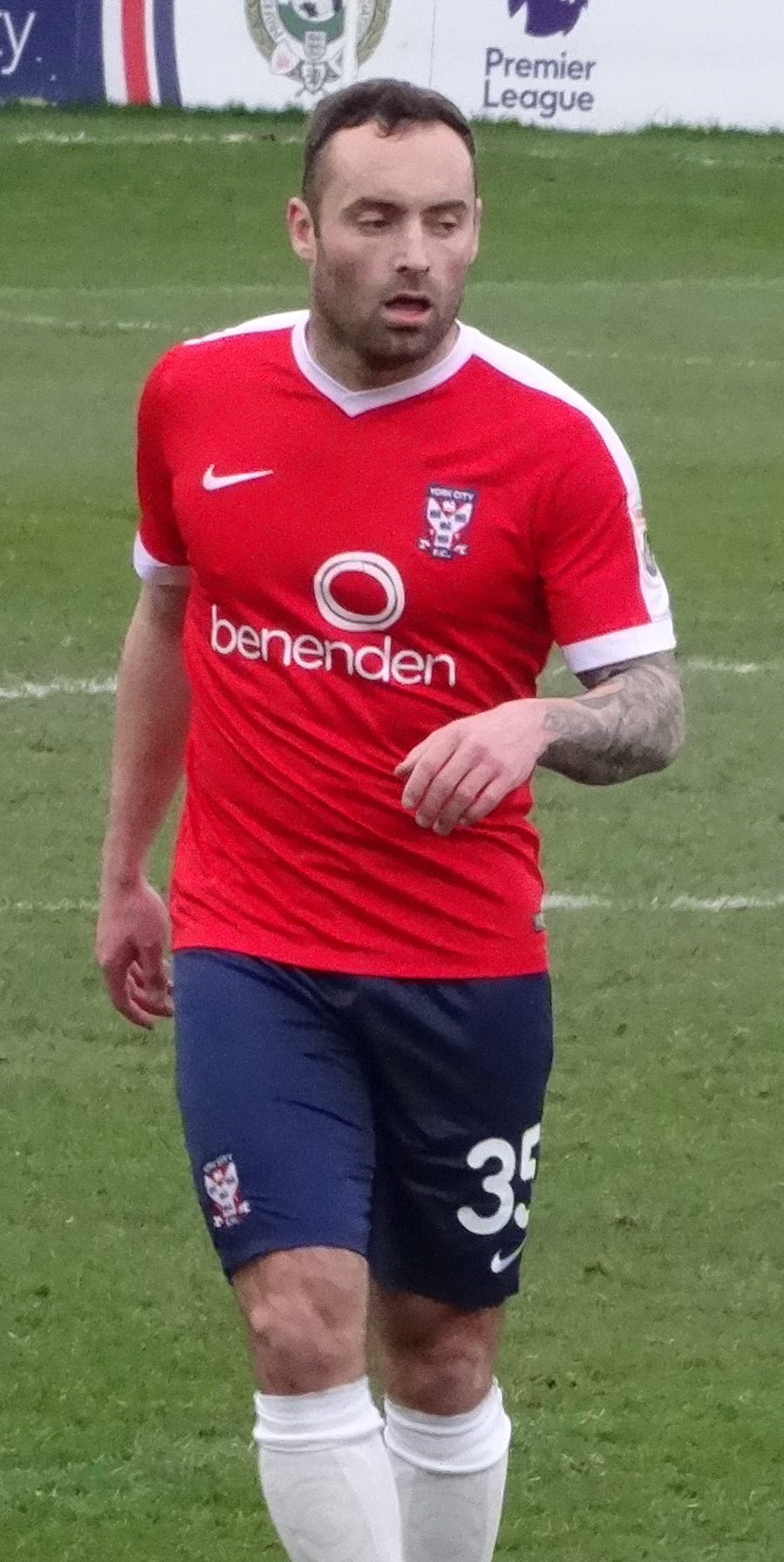
- Holmes playing for York City in 2017

Personal information
- Full name: Daniel Holmes
- Date of birth: 6 January 1989 (age 37)
- Place of birth: Birkenhead, England
- Height: 6 ft 0 in (1.83 m)
- Position: Defender

Team information
- Current team: Flint Town United (manager)

Youth career
- 1996–2007: Tranmere Rovers

Senior career*
| Years | Team | Apps | (Gls) |
| 2007–2009 | Tranmere Rovers | 1 | (0) |
| 2007–2008 | → Southport (loan) | 14 | (0) |
| 2009–2011 | The New Saints | 57 | (2) |
| 2011–2015 | Tranmere Rovers | 133 | (4) |
| 2011 | → Fleetwood Town (loan) | 3 | (0) |
| 2015–2016 | Newport County | 35 | (0) |
| 2016 | AFC Fylde | 16 | (0) |
| 2016–2017 | York City | 21 | (1) |
| 2017–2018 | Bangor City | 29 | (1) |
| 2018–2023 | Connah's Quay Nomads | 111 | (1) |
| 2023 | Colwyn Bay | 8 | (0) |
| Total | | 428 | (9) |

Managerial career
- 2023–2026: Vauxhall Motors
- 2026–: Flint Town United
- * Club domestic league appearances and goals

Daniel Holmes (born 6 January 1989) is an English football manager and former player. He is currently manager of Cymru Premier club Flint Town United.

== Career ==
=== Tranmere Rovers ===
Holmes was born in Birkenhead, Merseyside. He began his career with Tranmere Rovers, the team he supports, joining the club at the age of seven. He originally played as a forward but eventually became a defender. Having captained the youth and reserve teams, he signed his first professional in July 2007, shortly before the 2007–08 season.

Holmes spent the latter half of the season on loan at Conference North club Southport, making 15 appearances. At the end of 2008–09, having made one league appearance during a 1–0 defeat to Yeovil Town on 22 November 2008, Holmes was released by Tranmere.

=== The New Saints ===
Following his release, Holmes spent time on trial with Chester City before signing for The New Saints, joining his brother Tommy at the club. He made his debut in a 2–1 defeat to Icelandic team Knattspyrnufélagið Fram in the first qualifying round of the UEFA Europa League. At the end of his first season with the club, he was named in the Welsh Premier League team of the season.

He left TNS at the end of 2010–11, refusing to sign a new contract, and also being named in the Welsh Premier team of the season.

=== Tranmere Rovers (second spell) ===
On 27 June 2011, Holmes re-signed for Tranmere Rovers on a one-year contract. On 25 August 2011, he joined Fleetwood Town on a one-month loan to attempt to gain some first-team experience.

After breaking into the team in early 2012 and becoming a regular, and also winning the young player of the year award, Tranmere took up a further one year option on him for 2012–13.

Holmes scored his first goal for Tranmere in a 5–2 away win over Crawley Town on 22 September 2012.

=== Newport County ===
On 24 June 2015, following Tranmere's relegation into the National League, Holmes joined League Two club Newport County. He made his debut for Newport on 8 August 2015 versus Cambridge United. He was offered a new contract by Newport at the end of 2015–16 but the offer was withdrawn and he was released after he failed to accept the contract by the deadline of 10 June 2016.

=== AFC Fylde and York City ===
Holmes joined National League North club AFC Fylde in the summer of 2016. On 10 November 2016, he signed for National League club York City on a contract until the end of 2016–17. On 21 May 2017, Holmes started as York beat Macclesfield Town 3–2 at Wembley Stadium in the 2017 FA Trophy Final. He turned down a new contract with York in June 2017.

=== Bangor City ===
On 10 July 2017, Holmes signed for Welsh Premier League club Bangor City.

=== Connah's Quay Nomads ===
Following Bangor's demotion from the Welsh Premier League, Holmes joined Connah's Quay Nomads, with Nomads manager Andy Morrison stating Holmes was "the outstanding fullback in the league last season".

=== Colwyn Bay ===
In June 2023, Holmes joined Colwyn Bay as a player/coach after their promotion to the Welsh Premier League. Holmes left Colwyn Bay in October 2023.

== Managerial career ==
=== Vauxhall Motors ===
In October 2023, Holmes took up his first managerial position at Vauxhall Motors.

On 29 May 2026, Holmes departed the club.

=== Flint Town United ===
In September 2026 he was appointed by Flint Town United as club manager.

=== Managerial statistics ===
As of match played 1 December 2025

Managerial record by team and tenure
| Team | From | To | Record | | | | | Ref |
| Team | From | To | P | W | D | L | Win % | Ref |
|---|---|---|---|---|---|---|---|---|
| Vauxhall Motors | 23 October 2023 | 29 May 2026 | 100 | 44 | 21 | 35 | 44.0 | |
| Total | | | 100 | 44 | 21 | 35 | 44.0 | |

== Career statistics ==
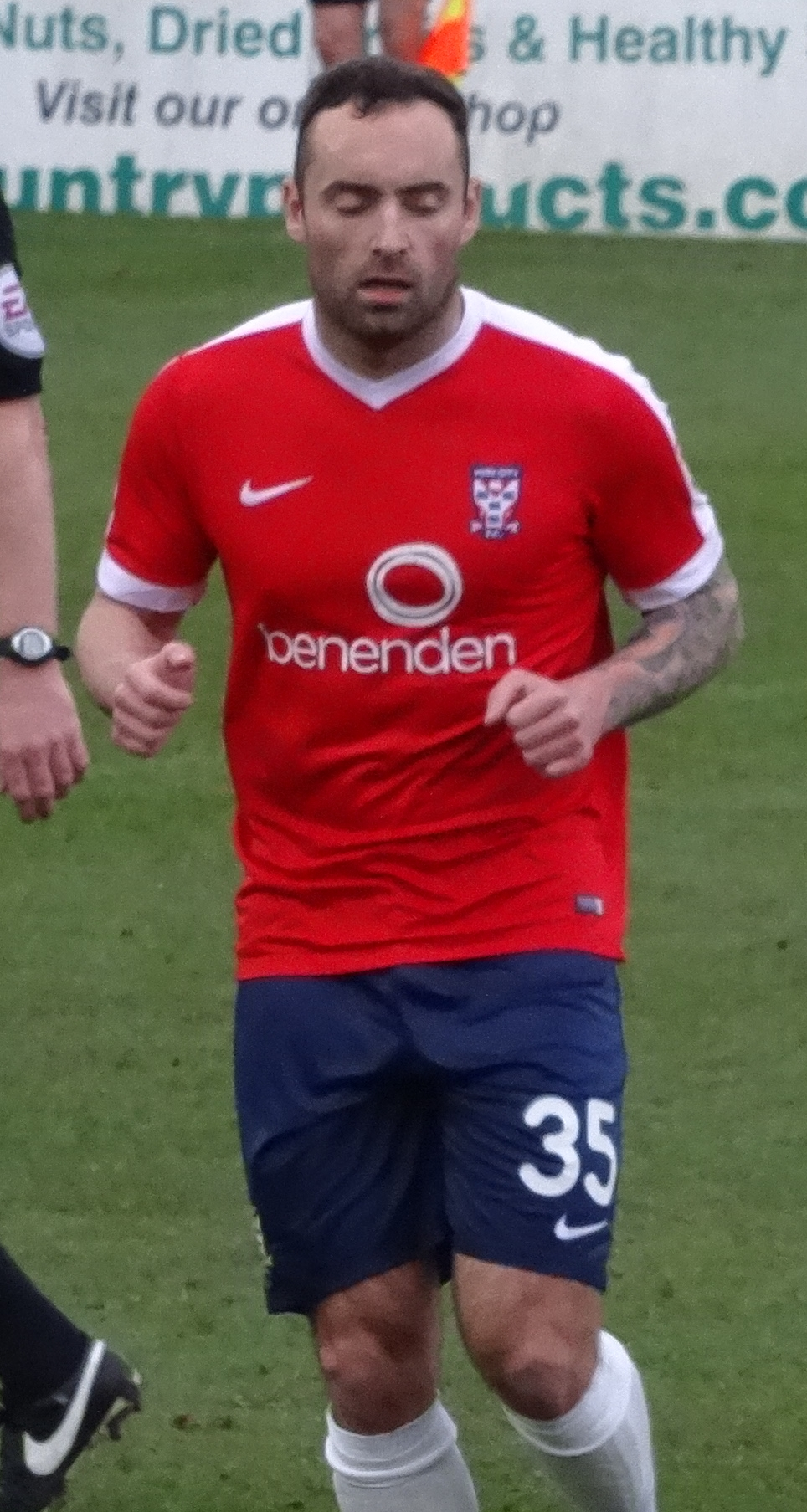
Holmes playing for York City in 2017

As of match played 16 February 2018

Appearances and goals by club, season and competition
| Club | Season | League | | | National Cup (Note: Appearances in Welsh Cup and FA Cup) | | League Cup (Note: Appearances in Welsh League Cup and League Cup) | | Other | | Total | |
| Club | Season | Division | Apps | Goals | Apps | Goals | Apps | Goals | Apps | Goals | Apps | Goals |
|---|---|---|---|---|---|---|---|---|---|---|---|---|
| Tranmere Rovers | 2007–08 | League One | 0 | 0 | 0 | 0 | 0 | 0 | 0 | 0 | 0 | 0 |
| Tranmere Rovers | 2008–09 | League One | 1 | 0 | 0 | 0 | 0 | 0 | 0 | 0 | 1 | 0 |
| Tranmere Rovers | Total | | 1 | 0 | 0 | 0 | 0 | 0 | 0 | 0 | 1 | 0 |
| Southport (loan) | 2007–08 | Conference North | 14 | 0 | — | | — | | 1 (Note: Appearance(s) in FA Trophy) | 0 | 15 | 0 |
| The New Saints | 2009–10 | Welsh Premier League | 32 | 0 | 1 | 0 | 0 | 0 | 2 (Note: Appearances in UEFA Europa League) | 0 | 35 | 0 |
| The New Saints | 2010–11 | Welsh Premier League | 25 | 2 | 0 | 0 | 3 | 0 | 6 (Note: Four appearances in UEFA Champions League, two in UEFA Europa League) | 0 | 34 | 2 |
| The New Saints | Total | | 57 | 2 | 1 | 0 | 3 | 0 | 8 | 0 | 69 | 2 |
| Tranmere Rovers | 2011–12 | League One | 26 | 0 | 0 | 0 | 0 | 0 | 1 (Note: Appearance(s) in Football League Trophy) | 0 | 27 | 0 |
| Tranmere Rovers | 2012–13 | League One | 43 | 2 | 3 | 0 | 2 | 0 | 1 | 0 | 49 | 2 |
| Tranmere Rovers | 2013–14 | League One | 28 | 0 | 2 | 0 | 3 | 0 | 0 | 0 | 33 | 0 |
| Tranmere Rovers | 2014–15 | League Two | 36 | 2 | 3 | 0 | 1 | 0 | 3 | 0 | 43 | 2 |
| Tranmere Rovers | Total | | 133 | 4 | 8 | 0 | 6 | 0 | 5 | 0 | 152 | 4 |
| Fleetwood Town (loan) | 2011–12 | Conference Premier | 3 | 0 | — | | — | | — | | 3 | 0 |
| Newport County | 2015–16 | League Two | 35 | 0 | 4 | 0 | 1 | 0 | 0 | 0 | 40 | 0 |
| AFC Fylde | 2016–17 | National League North | 16 | 0 | 1 | 0 | — | | — | | 17 | 0 |
| York City | 2016–17 | National League | 21 | 1 | — | | — | | 6 | 0 | 27 | 1 |
| Bangor City | 2017–18 | Welsh Premier League | 24 | 1 | 1 | 0 | 1 | 0 | — | | 26 | 1 |
| Career total | | | 304 | 8 | 15 | 0 | 11 | 0 | 20 | 0 | 350 | 8 |

== Honours ==
The New Saints

- Welsh Premier League: 2009–10
- Welsh League Cup: 2010–11

York City

- FA Trophy: 2016–17

Individual

- Welsh Premier League Team of the Year: 2009–10, 2010–11, 2017–18
