= Marc Laird =

Scottish footballer (born 1986)

Personal information
- Full name: Marc James Peter Laird
- Date of birth: 23 January 1986 (age 40)
- Place of birth: Edinburgh, Scotland
- Height: 1.85 m (6 ft 1 in)
- Position: Midfielder

Team information
- Current team: Civil Service Strollers

Youth career
- 199?–2000: Lothian Thistle Hutchison Vale
- 2000–2004: Manchester City

Senior career*
Years	Team	Apps	(Gls)
2004–2008	Manchester City	0	(0)
2007	→ Northampton Town (loan)	6	(0)
2007–2008	→ Port Vale (loan)	7	(1)
2008–2011	Millwall	75	(6)
2011	→ Brentford (loan)	4	(1)
2011	→ Walsall (loan)	8	(0)
2011–2013	Leyton Orient	23	(2)
2012	→ Southend United (loan)	12	(1)
2013–2014	Southend United	30	(0)
2014–2015	Tranmere Rovers	34	(1)
2015–2016	Yeovil Town	20	(0)
2016–2021	Edinburgh City	128	(7)
2021–2022	Stirling Albion	20	(0)
2022–	Civil Service Strollers		
- * Club domestic league appearances and goals as of 20:00, 16 April 2022 (UTC)

Marc James Peter Laird (born 23 January 1986) is a Scottish footballer who plays as a midfielder for Lowland League East club Civil Service Strollers, where he is also assistant manager.

Though he began his career with Manchester City in 2004, he was never used in a first-team game, though he did play in loan spells at Northampton Town and Port Vale. He signed with Millwall in 2008, playing in the club's 2009–10 promotion campaign. In 2011, he played for Brentford and Walsall on loan before moving on to Leyton Orient in the summer of 2011. He joined Southend United on loan in October 2012 and permanently moved to the club in January 2013. He signed with Tranmere Rovers in July 2014 and moved on to Yeovil Town a year later. He returned to his hometown in September 2016 to sign with Edinburgh City. He spent five years with Edinburgh before moving on to Stirling Albion in June 2021. He joined Civil Service Strollers the following summer.

== Career ==
=== Manchester City ===
Born in Edinburgh, Laird was a promising talent at Lothian Thistle Hutchison Vale, before he joined the Academy at Manchester City just before his 15th-birthday. He signed professional forms in January 2004. Laird received his first call into the senior squad for a competitive game when he was named as a substitute for a Premier League match versus Wigan Athletic on 21 October 2006. Awarded the number 39 shirt, he remained on the bench for the shock 4–0 defeat. He had brief loan spells in League One at Northampton Town in February 2007 and was called up again for the final game of the 2006–07 against Tottenham Hotspur, but did not get on the pitch. In May 2007, he was told manager Stuart Pearce had "high hopes" the young player would have "a really big year", however, Pearce was sacked a few days later.

Laird was involved with the City first-team during the 2007–08 pre-season, and he scored the fourth City goal in a 4–0 pre-season friendly victory against Carlstad United BK on 21 July. Things changed for Laird following the club's takeover by Thaksin Shinawatra and the appointment of Sven-Göran Eriksson as manager in July 2007. His only involvement with the first-team during the 2007–08 season came on 29 August 2007, when he was an unused substitute for a 2–1 League Cup second round victory over Bristol City. He never played a competitive game for the City first-team and was loaned to Port Vale in November/December 2007. It was at Vale Park where Laird scored his first league goal, when he netted a 25 yards (23 m) strike against Walsall on Boxing Day.

=== Millwall ===
He signed with Millwall on 9 January 2008, who were managed by former Manchester City Academy coach Kenny Jackett. On 23 February 2008, Port Vale again provided Laird with yet another milestone, as he scored his second career league goal and first goal for Millwall in the 44th minute of their 3–0 home win over Vale. He played 29 games in the Lions' promotion-winning 2009–10 campaign. He was an unused substitute in the play-off final victory over Swindon Town. At the end of the season Laird agreed to sign a new one-year deal with the club. Laird signed on loan at Brentford in January 2011. He was recalled after five appearances to play for Millwall in a Championship clash with Norwich City. In March he joined Walsall on loan for the rest of the season.

=== Leyton Orient ===
Laird signed a two-year deal with Leyton Orient in July 2011; "O's" boss Russell Slade described Laird as "a good passer and a decent athlete who will add strength to our squad." He made only 11 League One starts, as Orient avoided the drop by one place and seven points. On 26 October 2012, he dropped down a division when he joined League Two side Southend United on a three-month loan. "Shrimpers" manager Paul Sturrock said that "we are lacking in the middle of the park... he's a good passer and he will add some strength and experience there." He was named in the League Two team of the week after scoring in a 3–1 win over Rochdale at Roots Hall on 26 November. After making 15 starts for Southend, he returned to Orient. He was released from his contract by mutual consent on 4 January 2013.

=== Southend United ===
Having secured his release from Orient, Laird signed an 18-month contract with Southend United in January 2013. He ended the 2012–13 season with 27 appearances for Southend, though played no part in the club's run to the 2013 Football League Trophy final.

Laird missed eight weeks at the start of the 2013–14 season after damaging his medial ligaments. He returned to action and helped the "Shrimpers" to secure a League Two play-off place at the end of the season, where they were beaten by Burton Albion at the semi-final stage. He was released by the club at the end of the season, after which manager Phil Brown commented that "Marc was a bit unlucky with his injury this season".

=== Tranmere Rovers ===
Laird signed a one-year contract with League Two side Tranmere Rovers in July 2014. After Micky Adams was appointed as manager Laird and James Rowe shared the central midfield role with Steve Jennings in defensive midfield and Max Power in attacking midfield. He played 39 games in the 2014–15 season, as Rovers were relegated out of the English Football League.

=== Yeovil Town ===
On 19 June 2015, Laird signed for League Two side Yeovil Town on a one-year deal upon the expiry of his contract with Tranmere Rovers. He was released at the end of the 2015–16 season.

=== Edinburgh City ===
On 21 September 2016, following his release from Yeovil Town, Laird signed for Scottish League Two side Edinburgh City. Laird said he hoped the move would allow him the chance to raise his profile in Scotland. However, after picking up the division's Player of the Month award for November he decided to extend his stay at the club and signed a two-year contract extension to keep him at the Meadowbank Stadium until June 2018. This deal was then extended by a further two years in June 2017. He picked up the club's Goal of the Season award for the 2016–17 campaign for his strike in the 3–3 draw Arbroath on 1 October. He made 40 appearances over the course of the 2017–18 campaign as the "Citizens" finished in ninth-place under the stewardship of James McDonaugh, just one spot above the relegation play-offs. With just two goals in two years at Ainslie Park, Laird admitted he was disappointed in his goal tally. He added one further goal over 43 appearances in the 2018–19 season; City qualified for the play-offs but were beaten 4–0 by Clyde at the semi-final stage. He scored four goals from 31 games in the 2019–20 season, which was declared early due to the COVID-19 pandemic in Scotland, with Edinburgh second to champions Cove Rangers. He made 18 appearances in the 2020–21 campaign as Edinburgh secured a play-off place with a second-place finish, though did not play in the play-off semi-final defeat to Elgin City.

=== Stirling Albion ===
Laird signed for League Two club Stirling Albion on 9 June 2021 as manager Kevin Rutkiewicz looked to add experience to Forthbank. He was sent off after receiving two yellow cards in a 1–0 defeat to Stenhousemuir at the Forthbank Stadium on 5 March. He played 26 games in the 2021–22 campaign and was not retained in the summer by Darren Young.

=== Civil Service Strollers ===
Laird joined Civil Service Strollers of the Lowland League in the summer of 2022. He was named in the Team of the Month for April 2024. He was appointed as the club's assistant manager in June 2025.

== Style of play ==
Laird is a box-to-box midfielder. Kenny Jackett, his manager at Millwall, stated that Laird had a good character and positive mindset.

== Career statistics ==
As of match played 16 April 2022

Appearances and goals by club, season and competition
Club	Season	League			National cup (Note: Includes FA Cup, Scottish Cup)		League cup (Note: Includes Football League Cup, Scottish League Cup)		Other		Total	
Club	Season	Division	Apps	Goals	Apps	Goals	Apps	Goals	Apps	Goals	Apps	Goals
Manchester City	2006–07	Premier League	0	0	0	0	0	0	—		0	0
Manchester City	2007–08	Premier League	0	0	0	0	0	0	—		0	0
Manchester City	Total		0	0	0	0	0	0	0	0	0	0
Northampton Town (loan)	2006–07	League One	6	0	—		—		—		6	0
Port Vale (loan)	2007–08	League One	7	1	3	0	—		—		10	1
Millwall	2007–08	League One	17	1	0	0	0	0	0	0	17	1
Millwall	2008–09	League One	37	5	4	1	1	0	2 (Note: Appearance(s) in League One play-offs)	0	44	6
Millwall	2009–10	League One	20	0	5	0	2	0	2 (Note: One appearance in Football League Trophy, one in League One play-offs)	0	29	0
Millwall	2010–11	Championship	1	0	0	0	1	0	—		2	0
Millwall	Total		75	6	9	1	4	0	4	0	92	7
Brentford (loan)	2010–11	League One	4	1	—		—		1 (Note: Appearance(s) in Football League Trophy)	0	5	1
Walsall (loan)	2010–11	League One	8	0	—		—		—		8	0
Leyton Orient	2011–12	League One	22	2	2	0	2	0	1	0	27	2
Leyton Orient	2012–13	League One	1	0	0	0	0	0	1	0	2	0
Leyton Orient	Total		23	2	2	0	2	0	2	0	29	2
Southend United	2012–13	League Two	23	1	4	1	—		0	0	27	2
Southend United	2013–14	League Two	19	0	2	1	0	0	0	0	21	1
Southend United	Total		42	1	6	2	0	0	0	0	48	3
Tranmere Rovers	2014–15	League Two	34	1	3	0	0	0	2	0	39	1
Yeovil Town	2015–16	League Two	20	0	0	0	1	0	1	0	22	0
Edinburgh City	2016–17	Scottish League Two	24	1	4	0	0	0	0	0	28	1
Edinburgh City	2017–18	Scottish League Two	34	1	1	0	4	0	1 (Note: Appearance(s) in the Scottish Challenge Cup)	0	40	1
Edinburgh City	2018–19	Scottish League Two	29	1	3	0	4	0	7 (Note: 5 appearances in the Scottish Challenge Cup and 2 appearances in the play-offs)	0	43	1
Edinburgh City	2019–20	Scottish League Two	25	4	2	0	3	0	1	0	31	4
Edinburgh City	2020–21	Scottish League Two	16	0	2	0	0	0	0	0	18	0
Edinburgh City	Total		128	7	12	0	11	0	9	0	160	7
Stirling Albion	2021–22	Scottish League Two	20	0	1	0	4	0	1	0	26	0
Career total			367	19	36	3	22	0	20	0	445	22

== Honours ==
Millwall

- Football League One play-offs: 2010

Individual

- Scottish League Two Player of the Month: November 2016
