= Thomas Adeoye Lambo =

Nigerian psychiatrist (1923–2004)

Thomas Adeoye Lambo OBE
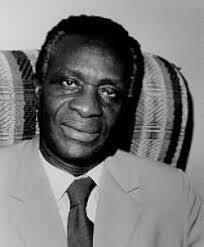
- Lambo on November 28, 1997
- Born: Thomas Adeoye Lambo; 29 March 1923; Abeokuta, Ogun State, Nigeria
- Died: 13 March 2004 (aged 80)
- Education: University of Birmingham
- Occupation: Psychiatrist

Thomas Adeoye Lambo OBE (March 29, 1923 – March 13, 2004) is one of the thirty children of a Yoruba chief with twelve wives. He was a Nigerian scholar, administrator, global health leader and psychiatrist. He is widely recognized as the first western trained psychiatrist in Africa. Between 1971 and 1988, he worked at the World Health Organization, becoming the agency's Deputy Director General.

== Contributions and Legacy ==
Aro Village System: Lambo's most renowned contribution patients were treated in community settings, reducing stigma and promoting faster reintegration.

He was a pioneer in transcultural psychiatry, advocating that mental health care must be culturally sensitive.

He advocated for mental health policies globally through his WHO role.

He authored numerous influential academic papers on psychiatry in Africa.

He died on March 13, 2004, in Lagos, Nigeria.

== Early life ==
Lambo was born in Abeokuta, Ogun State, Nigeria. He attended the Baptist Boys' High School, Abeokuta, Ogun State from 1935 to 1940. He then proceeded to the University of Birmingham, where he studied medicine. To further his studies and became a specialist, in 1952, he enrolled at the Institute of Psychiatry, King's College London. Lambo became famous for his work in ethno-psychiatry and psychiatric epidemiology.

== Career ==
In 1954, after studying and working as a surgeon in Britain, Lambo returned to Nigeria where he was soon made the specialist in charge at the newly built Aro Federal Neuro-Psychiatric Hospital, Abeokuta. By then, Nigeria was undergoing a transition towards political independence which had hastened a culture of innovation and change instead of a period of feared stagnation or even regression. Before the independence movement, the Federal Government had tried to replicate the European system of creating asylums in the cities for lunatics and mentally ill individuals who were regarded as a social nuisance in the streets of many urban areas. The need to put the socially anomalous individuals under control, sometimes care and confinement was initiated and a few asylums including one at Yaba were built. However, the institutionalization of mental health was viewed with suspicion by many Nigerians and many still depended on native medicines and herbalists for care. Lambo, sensing a ground for development, used the opportunity of an independent regional government to start his outpatient treatment services, the Aro village, pioneering the use of modern curative techniques combined with traditional religion and native medicines. At Aro, Lambo sought the help of farmers near the asylum to take some of the patients as labourers, while they simultaneously underwent medical treatment, and the patients also paid for any extra services required, such as housing. He traveled around the country and brought in a few traditional healers from different parts of Nigeria as practitioners. His style helped relieve public mistrust of mental health hospitals and introduced to public discourse the care and treatment of mentally ill citizens. He is credited with providing a platform for re-integrating mentally ill patients into a normal setting and environment and to a certain extent partly shedding the stigma associated with those suffering from mental illness.

Lambo was vice-chancellor at the University of Ibadan from 1967 to 1971, during which a student, Adekunle Adepeju, was killed by the Nigerian Police Force at a protest.
