= Tolani Omotola =

German footballer

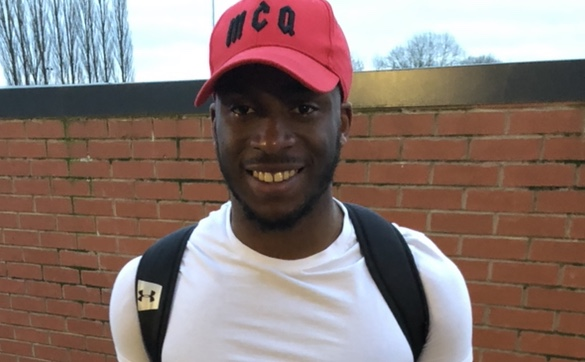
- Omotola in February 2019

Personal information
- Full name: Omotolani Daniel Omotola
- Date of birth: 16 April 1998 (age 28)
- Place of birth: Mannheim, Germany
- Height: 1.80 m (5 ft 11 in)
- Position: Forward

Team information
- Current team: Bedworth United F.C.

Senior career*
Years	Team	Apps	(Gls)
2015–2017	Tranmere Rovers	1	(0)
2015	→ Burscough (loan)	3	(1)
2016–2017	→ Witton Albion (loan)	25	(18)
2017–2018	Altrincham	0	(0)
2017	→ Ramsbottom United (loan)	5	(2)
2017	→ Loughborough Dynamo (loan)		
2018	Coalville Town	10	(7)
2018	Buxton		
2018–2019	Corby Town	6	(3)
2019	Coalville Town	14	(1)
2019–2020	Barwell	30	(24)
2020–2021	Hyde United		
2021	Alvechurch		
2021	Carlton Town		
2021	Stafford Rangers		
2021–2022	Atherton Collieries		
2022	Burscough		
2022–	Barwell	2	(0)
2025–2026	Bedworth United F.C.		
- * Club domestic league appearances and goals as of 22:00, 15 August 2022 (UTC)

Omotolani Daniel Omotola (born 16 April 1998) is a German footballer who plays as a forward for Bedworth United F.C. in the Northern Premier League Division One Midlands.

== Playing career ==
=== Tranmere Rovers ===
Omotola started his career at Tranmere Rovers and was first called up to a matchday squad for their League Two game at Prenton Park against Bury on 2 May 2015, their final match of a 94-year tenure in The Football League. He replaced Rory Donnelly for the final 14 minutes of the 0–1 defeat.

Following that season he spent some time on loan at Burscough and signed his first one-year professional contract on 3 June 2016. Omotola spent the entire 2016–17 season on loan at Witton Albion. He scored 16 goals in all competitions helping Witton Albion to win promotion to the Northern Premier League Premier Division through play-offs. At the end of the season Omotola was not offered a new contract and was released by Tranmere Rovers.

=== Non-League career ===
Following his release from Tranmere Rovers, Omotola was signed for Northern Premier League Premier Division side Altrincham on 9 June 2017. He went out on loan twice during his time at Altrincham, the first was to Ramsbottom United, but back with the club in September, 2017. Omotola's second loan was with Loughborough Dynamo at the start of November, 2017, the move turned out to be convenient, as he was a student at Loughborough University.

On 10 July 2018, he signed for Southern League Premier Division Central side Coalville Town, following his release from Altrincham. Omotola departed Coalville and joined Northern Premier League Premier Division side Buxton on 4 October 2018. On 21 December 2018, Southern League Division One Central side Corby Town confirmed the signing of Omotola from Buxton. He went on to make six appearances for the club and scored three goals.

On 30 January 2019 Omotola rejoined Coalville Town, returning to the club for his second spell of the season. He next joined Southern League Premier Division Central side Barwell for the 2019–20 season, initially on non-contract terms. He made his debut on 13 August 2019 in a 2–2 draw away at Alvechurch. On 31 August 2019, Omatola scored his first goal for the club, scoring a 90th-minute goal in a 3–1 victory over Kings Langley. In the very next Southern League Premier Division Central match on 14 September 2019, he added another two goals to his tally for the season, helping his club to a 3–2 away victory at Needham Market. Omotola was rewarded with a permanent contract on the 27 September 2019. On 3 December 2019, Omotola scored his first hat trick for Barwell, helping his side to a 5–1 away victory at Stratford Town.

The following season he signed for Hyde United. At the beginning of August 2021 he joined Alvechurch. In September 2021 he joined Carlton Town. He then joined Stafford Rangers in early October 2021 but left the club towards the end of November. He next joined Atherton Collieries.

Omotola returned to sign for Barwell on 9 August 2022. He made his debut four days later in a Southern League Premier Division Central fixture away to Bedford Town, as an 83rd-minute substitute for Roger Lee in a 3–2 loss.

== Career statistics ==
=== Club ===
As of match played 15 August 2022

Appearances and goals by club, season and competition
Club	Season	League			National Cup		League Cup		Other		Total	
Club	Season	Division	Apps	Goals	Apps	Goals	Apps	Goals	Apps	Goals	Apps	Goals
Tranmere Rovers	2014–15	League Two	1	0	0	0	0	0	0	0	1	0
Tranmere Rovers	2015–16	National League	0	0	0	0	—		0	0	0	0
Burscough (loan)	2015–16	Northern Premier League Division One North	3	1	0	0	—		0	0	3	1
Tranmere Rovers	2016–17	National League	0	0	0	0	—		0	0	0	0
Witton Albion (loan)	2016–17	Northern Premier League Division One South	25	18	0	0	—		0	0	25	18
Altrincham	2017–18	Northern Premier League Premier Division	0	0	0	0	—		0	0	0	0
Ramsbottom United (loan)	2017–18	Northern Premier League Division One North	5	2	0	0	—		0	0	5	2
Loughborough Dynamo (loan)	2017–18	Northern Premier League Division One South	—		—		—		—		—	
Coalville Town	2018–19	Southern League Premier Division Central	10	3	0	0	—		0	0	10	3
Buxton	2018–19	Northern Premier League Premier Division	—		—		—		—		—	
Corby Town	2018–19	Southern League Division One Central	6	3	0	0	—		0	0	6	3
Coalville Town	2018–19	Southern League Premier Division Central	14	1	0	0	—		0	0	14	1
Barwell	2019–20	Southern League Premier Division Central	30	15	2	2	—		5 (Note: Three appearances in FA Trophy) (Note: Two appearances in Leicestershire and Rutland Challenge Cup)	3 (Note: One goal in FA Trophy) (Note: Two goals in Leicestershire and Rutland Challenge Cup)	37	20
Barwell	2021–22	Southern League Premier Division Central	2	0	0	0	—		0	0	2	0
Career total			96	43	2	2	0	0	5	3	103	45

== Honours ==
Witton Albion

- Northern Premier League Division One South play-offs: 2016–17
