= Mitch Duggan =

English footballer

Personal information
- Full name: Mitchell James Duggan
- Date of birth: 20 March 1997 (age 29)
- Place of birth: Upton, England
- Height: 1.86 m (6 ft 1 in)
- Position: Defensive midfielder

Youth career
- 2012–2014: Tranmere Rovers

Senior career*
Years	Team	Apps	(Gls)
2014–2018	Tranmere Rovers	16	(0)
2015	→ Marine (loan)	19	(1)
2016	→ Trafford (loan)	19	(1)
2016	→ Warrington Town (loan)	17	(1)
2018–2024	Warrington Town	152	(2)
2021	→ Flint Town United (dual registration)	1	(0)
2021	→ Southport (dual registration)	0	(0)
2024	Vauxhall Motors	4	(0)
- * Club domestic league appearances and goals as of 22:45, 17 March 2024 (UTC)

Mitchell James Duggan (born 20 March 1997) is a footballer, formerly professional, who plays as a defensive midfielder.
