= Federal Neuro-Psychiatric Hospital, Aro =

Federal Specialty Hospital in Nigeria

Geography
- Location: Abeokuta, Ogun State, Nigeria

Links
- Website: portal.neuroaro.gov.ng
- Lists: Hospitals in Nigeria

Federal Neuro-Psychiatric Hospital, Aro is a federal government of Nigeria speciality hospital with 735 bed located in Abeokuta, Ogun State, Nigeria. As of June 2022, the chief medical director is Dr. Agboola Afiz Akanni.

== History ==
Federal Neuro-Psychiatric Hospital, Aro was established in 1944. The hospital was formerly known as an administrative prison/asylum.
