= Peter Brezovan =

Slovak footballer

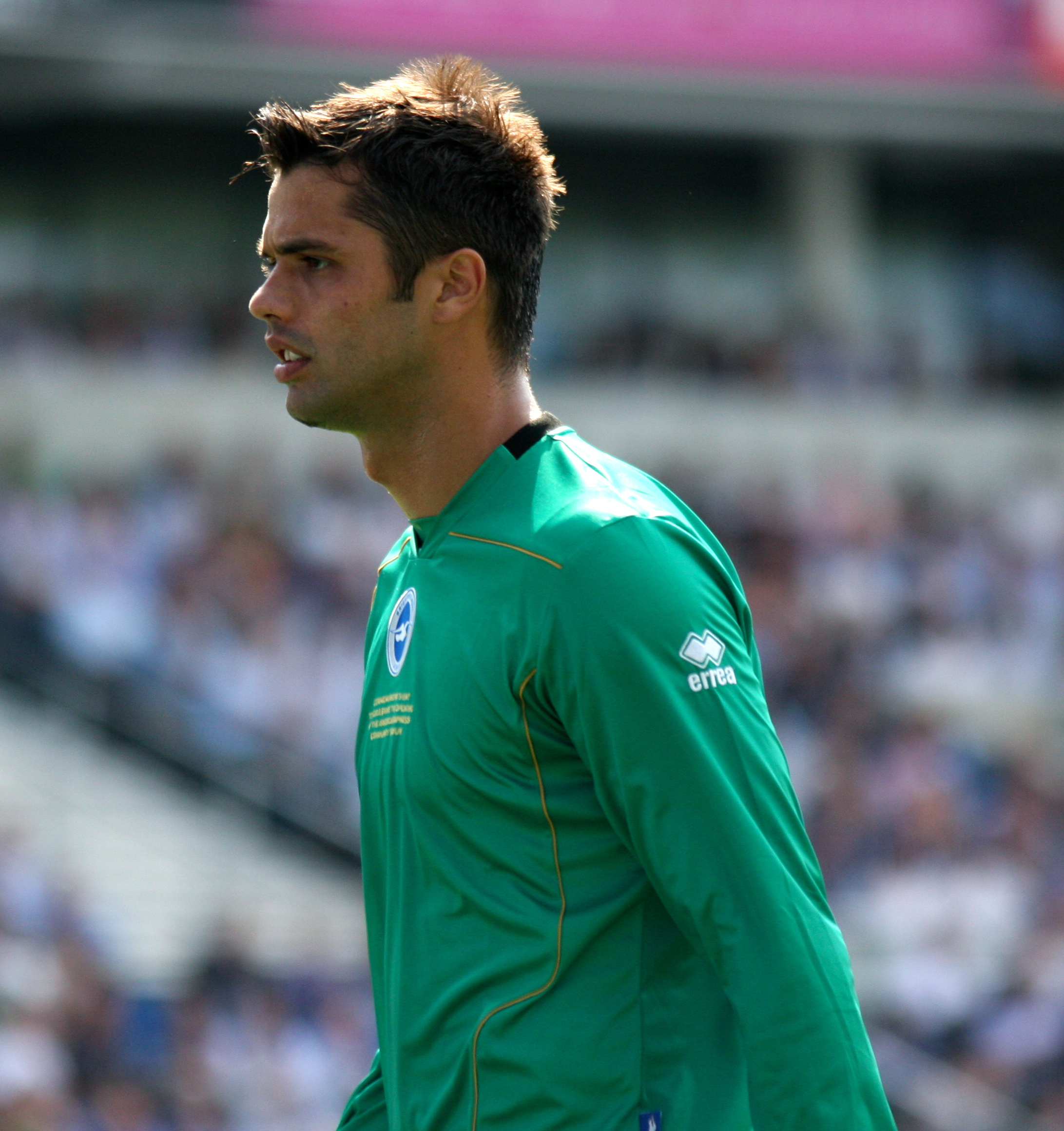

Personal information
- Date of birth: 9 December 1979 (age 46)
- Place of birth: Bratislava, Czechoslovakia
- Position: Goalkeeper

Youth career
- MŠK Iskra Petržalka

Senior career*
Years	Team	Apps	(Gls)
- FKM Vinohrady
- ŠKP
- Slovan Břeclav
2000–2002	1. HFK Olomouc	23	(0)
2002–2007	Brno	19	(0)
2004–2005	→ Inter Bratislava (loan)		
2006	→ Swindon Town (loan)	14	(0)
2007–2009	Swindon Town	52	(0)
2009–2014	Brighton & Hove Albion	47	(0)
2014	Portsmouth	0	(0)
2014–2015	Tranmere Rovers	6	(0)
2015	→ Southport (loan)	6	(0)
Total		167	(0)

International career
- Slovakia U21
- * Club domestic league appearances and goals

Peter Brezovan (born 9 December 1979) is a Slovak former footballer who played as a goalkeeper.

== Career ==
=== Early career ===
Brezovan began his career in his native Slovakia with PS Bratislava followed by moves to Vinohrady Bratislava, SKP Devín, Slovan Břeclav, 1. HFK Olomouc before joining 1. FC Brno. Brezovan played for FK Inter Bratislava on loan before he was spotted by Swindon Town boss Dennis Wise during a trial at Crewe Alexandra.

=== Swindon Town (loan) ===
Wise signed the Slovak on a season long loan with view to make the deal permanent later. His Swindon debut came on the opening day of the 2006–07 campaign – away at Hartlepool United, Brezovan saved two Hartlepool penalties from Joel Porter and Ritchie Humphreys.

Swindon finished 1–0 winners. Following his heroics in the game against Hartlepool and a string of impressive displays, Peter was awarded the PFA Player of the Month award for September. Falling awkwardly in the 76th minute of the home game against Grimsby Town on 14 October 2006, which Swindon won 3–0, Brezovan suffered a broken arm.

=== Swindon Town ===
On 29 March 2007 it was confirmed that he had signed a two-year contract with Swindon.

In September 2007 he spent two days on trial with Everton.

In October 2009 he was on trial at Crewe Alexandra but was not offered a contract.

=== Brighton & Hove Albion ===
He went on trial with Brighton and Hove Albion in December He subsequently signed a short-term deal keeping him at the club until January 2010. He made an immediate debut on 5 December in a 1–0 away win against Exeter City; a game in which he also saved a penalty. He stayed with the club for four and a half years before being released in May 2014.

=== Portsmouth ===
On 18 August 2014 he signed for Portsmouth on a short-term, non-contract basis.

=== Tranmere Rovers ===
On 1 September 2014, transfer deadline day, Brezovan signed for League Two side Tranmere Rovers on a one-year deal. He made his debut for the club on 6 September in a 3–2 loss to Accrington Stanley.

Peter joined Southport on a one-month loan on 27 February 2015. He made his debut one day later, in a 5–3 loss at Forest Green. The team's form saw a turnaround with Brezovan in goal as he then kept four clean sheets in the next five games, helping Southport to four wins and a draw. He was recalled by Tranmere on 21 March 2015, after Owain Fon Williams was called up to the Wales Squad. At the end of the season, with Tranmere Rovers relegated from League Two, Brezovan was released by the club.
