= Tolani Asuni =

Nigerian psychiatrist (1924–2011)

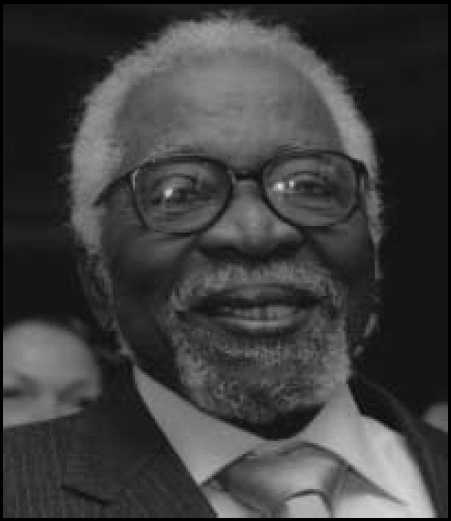
- Born: 6 January 1924
- Died: 21 June 2021 (aged 97)
- Education: Olowogbowo Methodist School; Olowogbowo Baptist Academy; Igbobi College; Trinity College Dublin School of Medicine
- Occupations: Doctor, psychiatrist
- Years active: 1957-1964
- Notable work: Reduction of Stigmatization Surrounding Suicide, Rehabilitation of the unhoused and mentally ill students.
- Parent(s): Suwe and T.M. Asuni

Tolani Asuni (January 6, 1924 – June 21, 2011) was a Nigerian medical doctor and psychiatrist. Asuni was one of the first indigenous psychiatrists in Nigeria and is credited with promoting or encouraging mental health in Africa. He was educated in Nigeria and the West but later returned to Nigeria for his professional life. Asuni became the foundation professor of psychiatry at University College Hospital Ibadan where he worked from 1957 to 1976 as the Medical Superintendent of Aro Medical Hospital. From 1979 to 1984, he was the Director of the United Nations Social Defence Research Institute in Rome, Italy. Asuni was a suicidologist and forensic psychiatrist. His 1975 textbook, Mental Health and Disease in Africa, was used for many years by undergraduates and graduate students of mental health. Asuni helped to improve global understanding of mental health in Nigeria, Africa and abroad and He promoted the universality of mental health conditions.

== Early life ==
Tolani Asuni was born in Lagos, Nigeria to Suwe and T.M. Asuni, both business people in Nigeria. His was a Muslim trading family in the Yoruba tradition and, because of his mother's business travels, his paternal grandmother also had a significant influence on his life. Asuni attended both Olowogbowo Methodist School and Baptist Academy before he studied at Igbobi College, both of which are located in Lagos State, Nigeria

== Education ==
Asuni spent time beginning at age 18 working for the Department of the Treasury as an Audit Clerk (Third Class) and with the Department of Posts and Telegraphs he served as a Sub-inspector (Grade III). In hopes of studying medicine, he shifted to Trinity College Dublin School of Medicine, which he graduated from in 1952. When Asuni returned to Nigeria, a chance meeting with Adeoye Lambo in 1956 changed the course of his professional pursuits. He went back to school to study psychiatry in London at the Institute of Psychiatry (1957-1960).

== Career ==
Throughout his career, Asuni was actively involved in the international psychological community by producing knowledge and sharing that knowledge worldwide. He helped improve global understanding about mental health in Africa. After returning to Nigeria, Asuni replaced Adeoye Lambo as medical superintendent at the University College Hospital Ibadan. During his time there, Asuni developed a teaching center for students at the college. He was known as a positive mentor to the psychiatric students. While in Ibadan from 1957 to 1976, he further developed Adeoye Lambo's community care system for mental health patients. During Asuni's tenure, the care center became a World Health Organization center. Following his time in Ibadan, Asuni then became the Director of the United Nations Social Defence Research Institute (1979–1984) in Rome where, among other things, he was involved with the research and prevention of illegal artifact trading and drug trafficking. He was Chief Examiner at the Faculty of Psychiatry at the West African College of Physicians and chairman of the Psychiatric Hospitals Management Board. His work on mental health included seeking to reduce the stigma surrounding suicide and the rehabilitation of the unhoused and mentally ill.

== Research ==
Asuni focused his research interests on mental health, specifically suicide, drug use, and the cultural versus universal nature of mental health conditions. He studied suicide in Nigeria as compared to other parts of the world. In his work, Asuni sought to discover whether mental health conditions were driven by regional culture or if the conditions were universal across the globe. Asuni also studied the introduction, causes, and acceptance of cannabis in Nigeria.

Asuni also studied the effects of repatriation on mental health. From 1961 to 1964, Asuni studied 82 mentally ill students who had been repatriated to Nigeria. His findings reported that repatriation rarely helps mentally ill patients.

== Theory ==
Asuni was a transcultural psychiatrist who argued that non-Westerners suffer from the same types of mental illnesses, such as schizophrenia, depression, and anxiety, that Westerners do. Asuni rejected the notion of the "African mind" as different from the minds of those in the West. An example of this rejection is the study on Brain Fag Syndrome where some psychiatrists felt Nigerians were unique, but he did not. In the end, Asuni proved that Brain Fag Syndrome was found among people in many parts of the world.

Asuni embraced Western and traditional Nigerian healing practices but found Western techniques to be more effective. Where Lambo suggested the "traditional" Yoruba healers' work was equally effective, Asuni disagreed. He recognized the usefulness of the healer's art but looked for more than anecdotal reports for evidence of its efficacy. Asuni felt both could be used concurrently but saw challenges with putting into practice both Western and traditional techniques side-by-side. He strove to explain traditional healing in Western terms such as psychoanalytical and psychotherapeutic theories.

== Works ==
=== Books ===
- Book Chapter. "The drug abuse scene in Nigeria." In The International Challenge of Drug Abuse.
- Book Chapter. "University education of Criminology in Africa." In Eguzkilore.
- Modern Medicine and traditional medicine
- Book Chapter. "Psychiatry – Partner in the Administration of Justice." In Psychiatry by P. Pinchot, P. Berner, R. Wolf, K. Thau, eds.
- Colonial psychiatry and "the African mind."

=== Articles ===
- Suicide in Western Nigeria
- The dilemma of traditional healing with special reference to Nigeria
- Drug abuse in Africa
- Mental health and disease in Africa: with special reference to Africa south of the Sahara, with C. R. Swift.
- Aro hospital in perspective
- Impact of research on designing strategies for preventing and treating dependence on drugs: The case for developing countries–especially African countries
- Nigeria: Report on the care, treatment, and rehabilitation of people with mental illness.
- Preliminary study of juvenile delinquency in western Nigeria
- Mental Health Promotion through Psychosocial Rehabilitation, with M. Gittelman, with J. Dubuis, V. Nagaswami, I.R.H. Falloon & L. Publico.
- Community Development and Public Health By-Product of Social Psychiatry in Nigeria.
- Therapeutic communities of the hospital and villages in Aro Hospital Complex in Nigeria
- Sociocultural and Economic Determinants of Rehabilitation
- The Nyctohemeral Rhythm of Plasma Cortisol in Mental Illness in Nigerians, with B. Kwaku Adadevoh.
- Socio-medical problems of religious converts
- Towards the Success of Intercultural Marriage: A Nigerian Example, with Judith Asuni.
- Treatment of depression.
- Social Network and Traditional Support Systems for Victims.

=== Reports ===
- Socio-psychiatric problems of cannabis in Nigeria
