= James Rowe (footballer, born 1991) =

English footballer

Personal information
- Full name: James Michael Rowe
- Date of birth: 21 October 1991 (age 35)
- Place of birth: Oxford, England
- Height: 5 ft 11 in (1.80 m)
- Position: Midfielder

Youth career
- 2006–2007: Southampton
- 2008–2010: Reading

Senior career*
Years	Team	Apps	(Gls)
2010–2011	Reading	0	(0)
2009	→ Basingstoke Town (loan)	1	(0)
2011	→ Lewes (loan)	2	(0)
2011–2013	Forest Green Rovers	42	(0)
2013–2015	Tranmere Rovers	26	(3)
2015–2017	Cheltenham Town	60	(1)
2017–2021	Aldershot Town	85	(4)
- * Club domestic league appearances and goals as of 15:59, 26 April 2025 (UTC)

James Michael Rowe (born 21 October 1991) is an English footballer who last played as an attacking midfielder for Aldershot Town.

== Career ==
Born in Oxford, Rowe began his career in the Academy at Southampton before joining Reading, where after two years in the under-18 squad, he was handed a first year professional contract. Whilst at Reading he spent time on loan at Basingstoke Town in 2009 and Lewes in 2011.

He left Reading without making a senior appearance and joined Forest Green Rovers on trial in the summer of 2011. He scored in pre-season friendlies against Hereford United and Cirencester Town and earned a two-year deal with the club. He made his Forest Green debut on the opening day of the 2011–12 Conference Premier season against Stockport County. He left Forest Green in April 2013 after two seasons with the club.

He joined League One side Tranmere Rovers on trial in July 2013 and earned a one-year contract. He made his debut in a League Cup first round tie with Mansfield Town on 6 August and scored his first goal in professional football with the winner in Tranmere's 3–2 win over MK Dons in October. On 2 May 2014, it was announced that he had signed a new one-year contract to stay with Tranmere for another season.

Rowe's 90th-minute equaliser on the opening day of the 2014–15 season earned Tranmere a 1–1 draw with York City as he scored second professional goal. He fell out of favour after sixth game of the season and missed two months before coming back with a winning goal against Portsmouth on 29 November.

Rowe was released by Tranmere by mutual consent on 2 February 2015.

On 5 August 2015 Cheltenham Town manager Gary Johnson confirmed that Rowe would join the club for the 2015–16 season.

On 31 July 2017 Gary Waddock signed Rowe after a successful trial to Aldershot Town on a one-year contract. Despite being released by Aldershot at the end of the 2017–18 season, Rowe was given the opportunity to re-trial with the Hampshire-based side and subsequently signed a new one-year deal in July 2018.

== Career statistics ==
As of match played 15 September 2018

Appearances and goals by club, season and competition
Club	Season	League			FA Cup		League Cup		Other		Total	
Club	Season	Division	Apps	Goals	Apps	Goals	Apps	Goals	Apps	Goals	Apps	Goals
Reading	2010–11	Championship	—		—		—		—		—	
Basingstoke Town (loan)	2009–10	Conference South	1	0	—		—		—		1	0
Lewes (loan)	2010–11	Conference South	2	0	—		—		—		2	0
Forest Green Rovers	2011–12	Conference Premier	28	0	1	0	—		2 (Note: Appearance(s) in the FA Trophy)	0	31	0
Forest Green Rovers	2012–13	Conference Premier	14	0	1	0	—		1	0	16	0
Forest Green Rovers	Forest Green total		42	0	2	0	0	0	3	0	47	0
Tranmere Rovers	2013–14	League One	19	1	1	0	3	0	1 (Note: Appearance in the Football League Trophy)	0	24	1
Tranmere Rovers	2014–15	League Two	7	2	2	0	1	0	2	0	12	2
Tranmere Rovers	Tranmere total		26	3	3	0	4	0	3	0	36	3
Cheltenham Town	2015–16	National League	28	1	0	0	0	0	3	0	31	1
Cheltenham Town	2016–17	League Two	32	0	1	0	2	0	3 (Note: Appearance in the EFL Trophy)	0	38	0
Cheltenham Town	Cheltenham total		60	1	1	0	2	0	6	0	69	1
Aldershot Town	2017–18	National League	40	3	2	0	—		1 (Note: Appearance in the National League play-offs)	0	43	3
Aldershot Town	2018–19	National League	9	0	0	0	—		0	0	9	0
Aldershot Town	Aldershot total		49	3	2	0	—		1	0	52	3
Career total			180	7	8	0	6	0	13	0	207	7

== Honours ==
=== Cheltenham Town ===
Vanarama National League Winners: 2015-16
