= Rory Donnelly =

Northern Irish footballer (born 1992)

Personal information
- Full name: Ruaridhri James Patrick Donnelly
- Date of birth: 18 February 1992 (age 34)
- Place of birth: Belfast, Northern Ireland
- Height: 6 ft 2 in (1.88 m)
- Position: Striker

Team information
- Current team: Cliftonville

Senior career*
Years	Team	Apps	(Gls)
2010–2012	Cliftonville	50	(20)
2012–2015	Swansea City	0	(0)
2014	→ Coventry City (loan)	0	(0)
2015	→ Tranmere Rovers (loan)	20	(5)
2015–2017	Gillingham	66	(12)
2017–2020	Cliftonville	65	(28)
2020–2024	Glentoran	110	(19)
2024	→ Newington (loan)	10	(5)
2024–2025	Cliftonville	0	(0)
2025-	Newington	0	(0)

International career
2013	Northern Ireland U21	1	(0)
- * Club domestic league appearances and goals as of 1 February 2024

Ruaridhri James Patrick Donnelly (born 18 February 1992) is a Northern Irish professional footballer who plays as a striker for Newington in the NIFL Championship.

== Club career ==
=== Cliftonville ===
Donnelly was born in Belfast. He made his Cliftonville debut on 7 September 2010, coming on as an 85th-minute substitute in a 2–0 defeat against Linfield at Windsor Park in the County Antrim Shield. He went on to make 33 league and cup appearances in the 2010–11 season, scoring 7 league goals.

The 2011–12 season started well for Donnelly. In October 2011 he scored a hat-trick in a 6–2 win over Linfield in the County Antrim Shield, the same opposition in the same competition as his debut a year earlier. In November 2011 he scored four goals in a league match against Ballymena United in a 7–3 win to catch the eye of an unnamed Championship club.

His good form. continued, and he scored 13 goals in his first 18 league games of the 2011–12 season to attract interest from Arsenal and Liverpool, with the latter club's manager, Kenny Dalglish, confirming they had registered their interest.

Donnelly made his final appearance for Cliftonville on 17 December 2011, in a 2–1 home defeat against Coleraine. He had scored a total of 22 goals in 54 league and cup appearances spanning two seasons.

=== Swansea City ===
In December 2011, Swansea City offered £100,000 for Donnelly, before Everton bid "considerably more". The Welsh club then upped their bid and Donnelly agreed a three-and-a-half-year deal with Swansea on 30 December 2011 for an undisclosed fee. The transfer was completed on 10 January 2012, and Donnelly was given the shirt number 41.

Donnelly scored on his debut for the reserves in a 2–2 draw with Chelsea's reserves at Parc y Scarlets on 28 March 2012.

Donnelly made his first senior appearance for Swansea in a League Cup fixture against Crawley Town on 25 September 2012, coming on as a substitute for Michu. His full début came the next season in a Europa League play-off against Petrolul Ploiești which ended in a 2–1 defeat.

On 28 May 2015, Swansea City confirmed that Donnelly had been released by the club.

==== Coventry City (loan) ====
On 31 January 2014, Donnelly joined Coventry City on loan until the end of the 2013–14 season. On 4 February 2014, it was confirmed that Donnelly had returned to Swansea City due to non-footballing personal reasons.

==== Tranmere Rovers (loan) ====
On 6 February 2015, Donnelly was named the League Two Player of the Month for January after scoring 3 goals in his first month at the club, taking Tranmere Rovers out of the relegation zone.

=== Gillingham ===
Donnelly joined Gillingham on a free transfer in 2015.

On 28 April 2017, the club announced that he had "been suspended from his employment at the club with immediate effect". On 15 May, it was confirmed that he had been fined £700 after being caught driving without a full licence. Five days later, the club announced that Donnelly had been released at the end of his contract.

=== Return to Cliftonville ===
On 29 August 2017, Donnelly returned to Cliftonville signing a three-year contract.

=== Glentoran ===
On 31 January 2020, Donnelly joined East Belfast side Glentoran, signing a three-and-a-half-year contract. He made his debut for the side in a 0–0 draw against Carrick Rangers in the NIFL Premiership on 14 February 2020.

Donnelly started the match as Glentoran defeated Ballymena United 2–1 in the final of the 2019–20 Irish Cup. The game was the first football match in the United Kingdom to host fans since the COVID-19 outbreak, with 250 fans from each team permitted at Windsor Park.

On 10 April 2021, he scored a brace in a 2–0 win over Dungannon Swifts, including a header around 40 yards from goal.

On 1 February 2024, Donnelly joined NIFL Championship side Newington on loan for the remainder of the season.

On 7 May 2024, it was announced that Donnelly would be one of ten players departing Glentoran upon the expiry of their contracts.

=== Third spell at Cliftonville ===
Donnelly returned to Cliftonville for a third time on 16 July 2024, signing a one-year deal with the club.

== International career ==
In November 2011, he was called up to the Northern Ireland Under-21s for the first time, but he did not feature in the match against Serbia. In June 2013, Donnelly informed the IFA that he did not wish to be considered for selection for Northern Ireland. However, he then made his under-21 debut against Denmark in August 2013

== Career statistics ==
As of 1 September 2019

Appearances and goals by club, season and competition
Club	Season	League			National Cup		League Cup		Other		Total	
Club	Season	Division	Apps	Goals	Apps	Goals	Apps	Goals	Apps	Goals	Apps	Goals
Cliftonville	2010–11	IFA Premiership	31	7	0	0	2	0	0	0	33	7
Cliftonville	2011–12	IFA Premiership	19	13	0	0	3	2	0	0	22	15
Cliftonville	Total		50	20	0	0	5	2	0	0	55	22
Swansea City	2012–13	Premier League	0	0	0	0	1	0	0	0	1	0
Swansea City	2013–14	Premier League	0	0	0	0	0	0	1	0	1	0
Swansea City	2014–15	Premier League	0	0	0	0	0	0	0	0	0	0
Swansea City	Total		0	0	0	0	1	0	1	0	2	0
Coventry City (loan)	2013–14	League One	0	0	0	0	0	0	0	0	0	0
Tranmere Rovers (loan)	2014–15	League Two	20	5	0	0	0	0	0	0	20	5
Gillingham	2015–16	League One	38	10	1	0	2	0	1	0	42	10
Gillingham	2016–17	League One	28	2	2	0	0	0	3	0	33	2
Gillingham	Total		66	12	3	0	2	0	4	0	75	12
Cliftonville	2017–18	NIFL Premiership	34	11	4	3	3	1	0	0	41	15
Cliftonville	2018–19	NIFL Premiership	27	15	0	0	2	0	2	0	31	15
Cliftonville	2019–20	NIFL Premiership	4	2	0	0	0	0	4	1	8	3
Cliftonville	Total		65	28	4	3	5	1	6	1	80	33
Career total			201	65	7	3	13	3	11	1	232	72
