= 2011–12 Tranmere Rovers F.C. season =

Tranmere Rovers F.C.
2011–12 season
- Chairman: Peter Johnson
- Manager: Les Parry (until 4 March 2012); Ronnie Moore
- FA Cup: First round
- Football League Cup: First round
- Football League Trophy: Area quarterfinal
- Top goalscorer: League: Joss Labadie; Lucas Akins; Jake Cassidy (5); All: four players (5)
- Highest home attendance: 8,526 vs Stevenage (6 April)
- Lowest home attendance: 4,153 vs Rochdale (17 January)
- Average home league attendance: 5,130 (12th in the league)
Home colours	Away colours

The 2011–12 season was the 111th season of competitive association football and the 85th season in the Football League played by Tranmere Rovers Football Club, a professional football club based in Birkenhead, Wirral.

== Background and pre-season ==
=== Pre-season matches ===
16 July 2011	Prestatyn Town	2–1	Tranmere Rovers	Prestatyn
15:00	Griffiths 45'; Cooke 89'		McGurk 16'	Stadium: Bastion Road

22 July 2011	Aberystwyth Town	7–0	Tranmere Rovers	Aberystwyth
19:00				Stadium: Park Avenue

23 July 2011	Altrincham	2–0	Tranmere Rovers	Altrincham
15:00	Clee			Stadium: Moss Lane

27 July 2011	Tranmere Rovers	1–1	Manchester United XI	Birkenhead
19:30	McChrystal 3'		Lingard 33'	Stadium: Prenton Park

29 July 2011	Shrewsbury Town	0–2	Tranmere Rovers	Shrewsbury
19:30			Akins 11'; Weir 58'	Stadium: Greenhous Meadow; Attendance: 1,047

2 August 2011	Tranmere Rovers	2–0	Liverpool XI	Birkenhead
19:00	Buchanan 36'; Tiryaki 52'			Stadium: Prenton Park

== League One ==
=== League table ===
Pos	Team	Pld	W	D	L	GF	GA	GD	Pts
10	Colchester United	46	13	20	13	61	66	−5	59
11	AFC Bournemouth	46	15	13	18	48	52	−4	58
12	Tranmere Rovers	46	14	14	18	49	53	−4	56
13	Hartlepool United	46	14	14	18	50	55	−5	56
14	Bury	46	15	11	20	60	79	−19	56

Updated to match(es) played on 5 May 2012. Source: BBC Sport
Rules for classification: 1) Points; 2) Goal difference; 3) Number of goals scored

=== Results by matchday ===
Round	1	2	3	4	5	6	7	8	9	10	11	12	13	14	15	16	17	18	19	20	21	22	23	24	25	26	27	28	29	30	31	32	33	34	35	36	37	38	39	40	41	42	43	44	45	46
Ground	H	A	A	H	A	H	A	H	H	A	H	A	H	H	A	A	H	H	A	H	A	H	A	H	A	H	A	H	A	A	H	A	A	H	H	H	A	A	H	A	H	A	A	H	A	H
Result	W	W	L	D	W	D	L	L	W	L	D	D	W	W	W	L	D	L	L	L	L	W	L	D	L	D	L	D	L	D	D	L	L	D	W	W	D	W	W	L	W	L	W	D	L	D
Position	7	3	5	6	5	5	10	12	10	11	12	12	11	8	6	7	8	8	12	15	15	12	16	17	17	16	17	17	17	17	17	17	19	20	19	16	16	15	12	13	11	13	11	11	13	12

Updated to match(es) played on 5 May 2012. Source: Statto.com
A = Away; H = Home; W = Win; D = Draw; L = Loss

=== Matches ===
6 August 2011 1	Tranmere Rovers	1–0	Chesterfield	Birkenhead
15:00	Weir 74'	BBC report TRFC report		Stadium: Prenton Park; Attendance: 5,755

13 August 2011 2	Leyton Orient	0–1	Tranmere Rovers	Leyton
15:00		BBC report TRFC report	Buchanan 60'	Stadium: Brisbane Road; Attendance: 3,658

16 August 2011 3	Notts County	3–2	Tranmere Rovers	Nottingham
19:45	Kelly 52'; Pearce 60'; J. Hughes 90+7' (pen.)	BBC report TRFC report	Welsh 10'; Labadie 80'; Raven (yellow card) 18' (yellow-red card) 90+4'; McGurk (red card) 90+6'	Stadium: Meadow Lane; Attendance: 4,883

20 August 2011 4	Tranmere Rovers	1–1	Sheffield United	Birkenhead
15:00	Labadie 80'	BBC report TRFC report	Montgomery 44'	Stadium: Prenton Park; Attendance: 6,244

27 August 2011 5	Brentford	0–2	Tranmere Rovers	Brentford
15:00		BBC report TRFC report	Weir 28'; Robinson 46'	Stadium: Griffin Park; Attendance: 5,381

3 September 2011 6	Tranmere Rovers	0–0	Yeovil Town	Birkenhead
15:00		BBC report TRFC report		Stadium: Prenton Park; Attendance: 5,037

10 September 2011 7	Huddersfield Town	2–0	Tranmere Rovers	Huddersfield
15:00	Roberts 24'; Arfield 82'	BBC report TRFC report		Stadium: Galpharm Stadium; Attendance: 12,013

13 September 2011 8	Tranmere Rovers	1–2	Carlisle United	Birkenhead
19:45	Akins 51'	BBC report TRFC report	Miller 3'; Berrett 35' (pen.)	Stadium: Prenton Park; Attendance: 4,219

17 September 2011 9	Tranmere Rovers	2–0	Wycombe Wanderers	Birkenhead
15:00	Showunmi 9'; Taylor 60'	BBC report TRFC report		Stadium: Prenton Park; Attendance: 4,297

24 September 2011 10	Preston North End	2–1	Tranmere Rovers	Preston
15:00	Alexander 37' (pen.); Mayor 71'; Parry (yellow card) 18' (yellow-red card) 75'	BBC report TRFC report	Baxter 60'	Stadium: Deepdale; Attendance: 17,281

1 October 2011 11	Tranmere Rovers	0–0	Bournemouth	Birkenhead
15:00		BBC report TRFC report		Stadium: Prenton Park; Attendance: 4,179

8 October 2011 12	Charlton Athletic	1–1	Tranmere Rovers	London
15:00	Jackson 80' (pen.)	BBC report TRFC report	McGurk 33'	Stadium: The Valley; Attendance: 15,038

15 October 2011 13	Tranmere Rovers	1–0	Oldham Athletic	Birkenhead
15:00	Baxter 18'	BBC report TRFC report		Stadium: Prenton Park; Attendance: 5,117

22 October 2011 14	Tranmere Rovers	2–1	Walsall	Birkenhead
15:00	Weir 59'; Tiryaki 80'	BBC report TRFC report	Butler 73'	Stadium: Prenton Park; Attendance: 4,469

25 October 2011 15	Hartlepool United	0–2	Tranmere Rovers	Hartlepool
19:45		BBC report TRFC report	Akins 46', 66'	Stadium: Victoria Park; Attendance: 5,200

29 October 2011 16	Scunthorpe United	4–2	Tranmere Rovers	Scunthorpe
15:00	Duffy 20'; Grant 44', 67' (pen.); Dagnall 52'	BBC report TRFC report	Tiryaki 4', 32'; Baxter (red card) 63'	Stadium: Glanford Park; Attendance: 4,282

5 November 2011 17	Tranmere Rovers	0–0	Colchester United	Birkenhead
15:00		BBC report TRFC report		Stadium: Prenton Park; Attendance: 4,312

19 November 2011 18	Tranmere Rovers	1–2	Sheffield Wednesday	Birkenhead
15:00	Baxter 38'	BBC report TRFC report	Lines 45+1'; Lowe 80'	Stadium: Prenton Park; Attendance: 6,652

26 November 2011 19	Exeter City	3–0	Tranmere Rovers	Exeter
15:00	Bennett 41'; Coles 66'; Logan 78'	BBC report TRFC report		Stadium: St James Park; Attendance: 4,108

10 December 2011 20	Tranmere Rovers	0–2	Milton Keynes Dons	Birkenhead
15:00		BBC report TRFC report	Ibehre 19'; Williams 60'	Stadium: Prenton Park; Attendance: 4,314

17 December 2011 21	Stevenage	2–1	Tranmere Rovers	Stevenage
15:00	Beardsley 38'; May (red card) 70'; Roberts 84'	BBC report TRFC report	Labadie 90+3' (pen.)	Stadium: Broadhall Way; Attendance: 3,376

30 December 2011 22	Tranmere Rovers	2–0	Bury	Birkenhead
19:45	Labadie 24'; Taylor 90'	BBC report TRFC report		Stadium: Prenton Park; Attendance: 5,253

2 January 2012 23	Sheffield Wednesday	2–1	Tranmere Rovers	Sheffield
15:00	R. Johnson 2'; Lines 7'	BBC report TRFC report	Goodison 82'	Stadium: Hillsborough Stadium; Attendance: 24,254

7 January 2012 24	Tranmere Rovers	2–2	Brentford	Birkenhead
15:00	Devaney 4'; Dean 55' (o.g.)	BBC report TRFC report	Alexander 22'; Donaldson 32'	Stadium: Prenton Park; Attendance: 4,432

14 January 2012 25	Yeovil Town	2–1	Tranmere Rovers	Yeovil
15:00	Edwards 19'; Williams 90+5'	BBC report TRFC report	McGurk 9'	Stadium: Huish Park; Attendance: 4,083

17 January 2012 26	Tranmere Rovers	0–0	Rochdale	Birkenhead
19:45		BBC report [ TRFC report]		Stadium: Prenton Park; Attendance: 4,153

21 January 2012 27	Bournemouth	2–1	Tranmere Rovers	Bournemouth
15:00	Thomas 18'; Pugh 30'	BBC report TRFC report	Devaney 4'	Stadium: Dean Court; Attendance: 5,807

28 January 2012 28	Tranmere Rovers	1–1	Huddersfield Town	Birkenhead
15:00	McGurk 51'	BBC report TRFC report	Rhodes 49'	Stadium: Prenton Park; Attendance: 5,851

4 February 2012 29	Wycombe Wanderers	2–1	Tranmere Rovers	High Wycombe
15:00	Whichelow 23'; Ainsworth 30'	BBC report TRFC report	McGurk 5'	Stadium: Adams Park; Attendance: 4,398

14 February 2012 30	Carlisle United	0–0	Tranmere Rovers	Carlisle
19:45		BBC report TRFC report		Stadium: Brunton Park; Attendance: 4,152

18 February 2012 31	Tranmere Rovers	1–1	Charlton Athletic	Birkenhead
15:00	Brunt 33'	BBC report TRFC report	Morrison 60'	Stadium: Prenton Park; Attendance: 4,685

25 February 2012 32	Oldham Athletic	1–0	Tranmere Rovers	Oldham
15:00	Kuqi 48' (pen.)	BBC report TRFC report		Stadium: Boundary Park; Attendance: 3,866

3 March 2012 33	Chesterfield	1–0	Tranmere Rovers	Chesterfield
15:00	Bowery 75'	BBC report TRFC report		Stadium: Proact Stadium; Attendance: 5,861

6 March 2012 34	Tranmere Rovers	1–1	Notts County	Birkenhead
19:45	Welsh 90+3'	BBC report TRFC report	Stewart 5'	Stadium: Prenton Park; Attendance: 4,565

10 March 2012 35	Tranmere Rovers	2–0	Leyton Orient	Birkenhead
15:00	Robinson 35'; Showunmi 45+1'	BBC report TRFC report		Stadium: Prenton Park; Attendance: 6,824

13 March 2012 36	Tranmere Rovers	2–1	Preston North End	Birkenhead
19:45	Showunmi 15'; Robinson 67'	BBC report TRFC report	Cummins 12'	Stadium: Prenton Park; Attendance: 4,612

17 March 2012 37	Sheffield United	1–1	Tranmere Rovers	Sheffield
15:00	Evans 31'	BBC report TRFC report	Akins 54'	Stadium: Bramall Lane; Attendance: 17,444

20 March 2012 38	Rochdale	0–2	Tranmere Rovers	Rochdale
19:45		BBC report TRFC report	Wallace 28'; Cassidy 82'	Stadium: Spotland Stadium; Attendance: 2,618

24 March 2012 39	Tranmere Rovers	2–0	Exeter City	Birkenhead
15:00	Labadie 49'; Cassidy 90+3'	BBC report TRFC report		Stadium: Prenton Park; Attendance: 4,786

31 March 2012 40	Bury	2–0	Tranmere Rovers	Bury
15:00	Sodje 67'; Coke 72'	BBC report TRFC report		Stadium: Gigg Lane; Attendance: 3,733

6 April 2012 41	Tranmere Rovers	3–0	Stevenage	Birkenhead
15:00	Cassidy 2', 11'; Akins 77'	BBC report TRFC report		Stadium: Prenton Park; Attendance: 8,526

9 April 2012 42	Milton Keynes Dons	3–0	Tranmere Rovers	Milton Keynes
15:00	Williams 10' (pen.), 74' (pen.); Gleeson 42'	BBC report TRFC report		Stadium: Stadium:mk; Attendance: 7,355

14 April 2012 43	Walsall	0–1	Tranmere Rovers	Walsall
15:00	Beevers (yellow card) 30' (yellow-red card) 90'	BBC report TRFC report	Robinson 62'	Stadium: Bescot Stadium; Attendance: 3,895

21 April 2012 44	Tranmere Rovers	1–1	Hartlepool United	Birkenhead
15:00	Welsh 40'; Fon Williams (red card) 72'	BBC report TRFC report	Sweeney 69'	Stadium: Prenton Park; Attendance: 4,757

28 April 2012 45	Colchester United	4–2	Tranmere Rovers	Colchester
15:00	Henderson 4'; Eastman 46'; Goodison 66' (o.g.); Sears 84'	BBC report TRFC report	Wallace 52'; Cassidy 72'	Stadium: Colchester Community Stadium; Attendance: 4,061

5 May 2012 46	Tranmere Rovers	1–1	Scunthorpe United	Birkenhead
15:00	McCrystal 27'	BBC report TRFC report	Thompson 61'	Stadium: Prenton Park; Attendance: 4,952

== FA Cup ==
12 November 2011 First round	Tranmere Rovers	0–1	Cheltenham Town	Birkenhead
15:00		BBC report TRFC report	Duffy 21' (pen.)	Stadium: Prenton Park; Attendance: 3,211; Referee: Craig Pawson

== Football League Cup ==
9 August 2011 First round	Doncaster Rovers	3–0	Tranmere Rovers	Doncaster
19:45	Brown 5' (pen.); Mason 29'; Bennett 59'	BBC report TRFC report		Stadium: Keepmoat Stadium; Attendance: 4,339; Referee: Gary Sutton

== Football League Trophy ==
30 August 2011 First round	Tranmere Rovers	1–1 (4–2 p)	Port Vale	Birkenhead
19:00	Taylor 88'	BBC report TRFC report	Taylor 50'	Stadium: Prenton Park; Attendance: 2,546; Referee: Mark Heywood
	Penalties
	Labadie (penalty scored); Power (penalty scored); Welsh (penalty missed); Weir (penalty scored); Taylor (penalty scored)		Roberts (penalty missed); Martin (penalty scored); Pope (penalty missed); McDonald (penalty scored)

4 October 2011 Second round	Accrington Stanley	1–2 *	Tranmere Rovers	Accrington
19:45	Bakayogo 9' (o.g.); *Abandoned after 39 minutes	BBC report	Taylor 20'; Tiryaki 35'	Stadium: Crown Ground

12 October 2011 Second round replay	Accrington Stanley	0–1	Tranmere Rovers	Accrington
19:45		BBC report TRFC report	Taylor 39'	Stadium: Crown Ground; Attendance: 1,509; Referee: James Adcock

8 November 2011 Area quarterfinal	Chesterfield	4–3	Tranmere Rovers	Chesterfield
19:45	Mendy 32'; Bowery 54', 80'; Westcarr 90+1'	BBC report TRFC report	McGurk 9'; Showunmi 70'; Tiryaki 72'	Stadium: Proact Stadium; Attendance: 3,152; Referee: Geoff Eltringham

== Players ==
Transfers, contract extensions and loans are listed from the last day of the previous season till the final day of this season

=== Transfers ===
In
Date	Player	Age	Previous club	Ends	Fee
27 June 2011	(England) Danny Holmes	22	The New Saints	1 July 2012	Free
29 June 2011	(England) Michael Kay	21	Sunderland	1 July 2012	Free
29 June 2011	(Northern Ireland) Robbie Weir	22	Sunderland	1 July 2012	Free
1 July 2011	(Wales) Owain Fôn Williams	24	Rochdale	1 July 2013	Free
29 July 2011	(Northern Ireland) David Buchanan	25	Hamilton Academical	1 July 2012	Free
2 August 2011	(Republic of Ireland) Martin Devaney	31	Barnsley	1 July 2012	Free
5 August 2011	(England) David Raven	26	Shrewsbury Town	1 July 2012	Free
5 August 2011	(England) Mustafa Tiryaki	24	Havant & Waterlooville	1 July 2012	Free

Out
Date	Player	Age	Status	Next club	Fee
10 May 2011	(England) Marlon Broomes	33	Released	Clitheroe	Free
10 May 2011	(England) Maxime Blanchard	24	Released	Plymouth Argyle	Free
10 May 2011	(England) Joe Collister	19	Released	Tamworth	Free
10 May 2011	(England) Nick Wood	20	Released	Mansfield Town	Free
10 May 2011	(England) Ryan Fraughan	20	Released	Stockport County	Free
10 May 2011	(Northern Ireland) Sam Morrow	26	Released	Ross County	Free
10 May 2011	(England) Jack Mackreth	19	Released	Barrow	Free
1 July 2011	(England) Aaron Cresswell	21	Transfer	Ipswich Town	Free
13 July 2011	(England) Dale Jennings	19	Transfer	Bayern Munich	Undisclosed
21 July 2011	(Republic of Ireland) Alan Mahon	33	Retired		Mutual
17 August 2011	(England) Tony Warner	37	Transfer	Wellington Phoenix	Free

=== Contract extensions ===
Date	Player	Age	Ends
23 May 2011	(England) Adam McGurk	22	1 July 2012
28 June 2011	(England) Andy Robinson	31	1 July 2012
30 June 2011	(Northern Ireland) Mark McChrystal	27	1 July 2013
29 July 2011	(England) Lucas Akins	22	1 July 2012

=== Loans ===
In
Player	Age	Signed from	Date	
Player	Age	Signed from	Started	Ended
(England) Ryan Donaldson	20	Newcastle United	16 September	16 October
(England) Jose Baxter	19	Everton	23 September	8 January
(England) Paul Rachubka	30	Leeds United	23 September	31 January
(England) Lateef Elford-Alliyu	19	West Bromwich Albion	16 January	16 February
(England) James Wallace	20	Everton	19 January	end of the season
(England) Ryan Brunt	18	Stoke City	27 January	end of the season
(Wales) Jake Cassidy	18	Wolverhampton Wanderers	16 March	end of the season

Out
Player	Age	Signed to	Date	
Player	Age	Signed to	Started	Ended
(England) Danny Holmes	22	Fleetwood Town	11 August	11 September
(England) Cole Stockton	17	Vauxhall Motors	27 November	27 December
(England) Cole Stockton	17	Vauxhall Motors	16 February	16 March
(England) Mustafa Tiryaki	24	Cambridge United	1 March	1 April

=== Season statistics ===
No.	Nat	Player	Total		League One		FA Cup		League Cup		League Trophy		Discipline		Signed^{†}		
No.	Nat	Player	A	G	A	G	A	G	A	G	A	G	Yellow card	Red card	Status	Joined	Left
Goalkeepers
1	(Wales)	Owain Fôn Williams	40+0	–	35+0	–	1+0	–	1+0	–	3+0	–	2	1	–	–	–
13	(England)	Andy Coughlin	1+1	–	1+1	–	–	–	–	–	–	–	–	–	–	–	–
22	(England)	John Courtney	–	–	–	–	–	–	–	–	–	–	–	–	youth	–	–
23	(England)	Paul Rachubka	10+0	–	10+0	–	–	–	–	–	–	–	1	–	loan	24.11	31.01
Defenders
2	(England)	Michael Kay	7+2	–	4+2	–	–	–	1+0	–	2+0	–	3	–	–	–	–
3	(Ivory Coast)	Zoumana Bakayogo	12+18	–	8+18	–	–	–	1+0	–	3+0	–	–	–	–	–	–
5	(Jamaica)	Ian Goodison	44+2	1	41+2	1	1+0	–	1+0	–	1+0	–	3	–	–	–	–
6	(Northern Ireland)	Mark McChrystal	20+1	1	17+1	1	–	–	1+0	–	2+0	–	3	–	–	–	–
12	(Wales)	Ash Taylor	40+1	4	36+1	2	1+0	–	–	–	3+0	2	1	–	–	–	–
15	(England)	Danny Holmes	26+1	–	25+1	–	–	–	–	–	1+0	–	1	–	–	–	–
16	(Northern Ireland)	David Buchanan	44+0	1	41+0	1	1+0	–	–	–	2+0	–	5	–	–	–	–
19	(England)	David Raven	18+2	–	17+0	–	1+0	–	0+1	–	0+1	–	2	1	–	–	–
Midfielders
4	(England)	Joss Labadie	11+20	5	9+18	5	0+1	–	–	–	2+1	–	8	–	–	–	–
8	(England)	John Welsh	48+1	3	43+1	3	1+0	–	1+0	–	3+0	–	10	–	–	–	–
10	(Northern Ireland)	Robbie Weir	33+11	3	29+10	3	1+0	–	1+0	–	2+1	–	7	–	–	–	–
11	(England)	Andy Robinson	23+5	4	21+4	4	1+0	–	1+0	–	0+1	–	3	–	–	–	–
18	(England)	Ryan Donaldson	1+0	–	1+0	–	–	–	–	–	–	–	–	–	loan	16.09	16.10
20	(England)	Max Power	2+4	–	2+2	–	–	–	–	–	0+2	–	1	–	–	–	–
21	(England)	Jose Baxter	15+0	3	14+0	3	–	–	–	–	1+0	–	–	1	loan	23.09	08.01
25	(Republic of Ireland)	Martin Devaney	18+5	2	16+4	2	0+1	–	1+0	–	1+0	–	4	–	–	–	–
27	(England)	James Wallace	18+0	2	18+0	2	–	–	–	–	–	–	7	–	loan	19.01	–
29	(England)	Jake Kirby	0+1	–	0+1	–	–	–	–	–	–	–	–	–	–	–	–
Forwards
7	(England)	Enoch Showunmi	21+9	4	21+6	3	0+1	–	0+1	–	0+1	1	1	–	–	–	–
9	(England)	Mustafa Tiryaki	21+14	4	16+14	3	1+0	–	1+0	–	3+0	1	4	–	–	–	–
14	(Northern Ireland)	Adam McGurk	28+7	5	25+6	4	1+0	–	1+0	–	1+1	1	5	1	–	–	–
17	(England)	Lucas Akins	40+9	5	36+8	5	1+0	–	0+1	–	3+0	–	2	–	–	–	–
18	(Wales)	Jake Cassidy	7+3	5	7+3	5	–	–	–	–	–	–	1	–	loan	16.03	–
24	(England)	Lateef Elford-Alliyu	2+2	–	2+2	–	–	–	–	–	–	–	–	–	loan	16.01	16.02
26	(England)	Cole Stockton	0+1	–	0+1	–	–	–	–	–	–	–	–	–	–	–	–
28	(England)	Ryan Brunt	11+4	1	11+4	1	–	–	–	–	–	–	–	–	loan	27.01	–
		Own goals		1		1		–		–		–					
		Total	51	54	46	49	1	0	1	5	3	5	72	4			

^{†} Statuses are mentioned for youth academy players without senior contract and players who were signed on non-contract basis or on loan. Dates joined and left are mentioned only for players who changed club between the first and the last matchday of the season.

Last updated: 3 May 2014.
Source: 11v11.com
