= 2010–11 Tranmere Rovers F.C. season =

Tranmere Rovers
2010–11 season
- Chairman: Peter Johnson
- Manager: Les Parry
- Stadium: Prenton Park
- League One: 18th (of 24)
- FA Cup: Round 1 (eliminated by Bournemouth)
- League Cup: Round 2 (eliminated by Swansea City)
- Football League Trophy: Semi-final (eliminated by Huddersfield Town)
Home colours	Away colours

The 2010–11 season was the 110th season of competitive association football and the 84th season in the Football League played by Tranmere Rovers Football Club, a professional football club based in Birkenhead, Wirral. Les Parry signed a one-year contract in June 2010 to stay as manager of the club.

== First-team squad ==
Includes all players who were awarded squad numbers during the season.

Note: Flags indicate national team as defined under FIFA eligibility rules; some limited exceptions apply. Players may hold more than one non-FIFA nationality.

No.	Pos.	Nation	Player
1	GK	(Faroe Islands) FRO	Gunnar Nielsen (until Jan 2011)
1	GK	(Trinidad and Tobago) TRI	Tony Warner (from Jan 2011)
2	DF	(Curaçao) CUW	Timothy Cathalina (until Apr 2011)
3	DF	(England) ENG	Aaron Cresswell
4	DF	(England) ENG	Marlon Broomes
5	DF	(Jamaica) JAM	Ian Goodison
6	DF	(England) ENG	Paul McLaren (until Nov 2010)
6	DF	(Northern Ireland) NIR	Mark McChrystal (from Jan 2011)
7	FW	(Nigeria) NGA	Enoch Showunmi
8	MF	(England) ENG	John Welsh (captain)
9	FW	(England) ENG	Ian Thomas-Moore (until Jan 2011)
9	MF	(England) ENG	Andy Robinson (from Jan 2011)
10	FW	(England) ENG	Terry Gornell (until Aug 2011)
10	MF	(Northern Ireland) NIR	Robbie Weir (from Feb 2011)
11	MF	(Republic of Ireland) IRL	Alan Mahon
12	MF	(Wales) WAL	Ash Taylor
13	GK	(England) ENG	Joe Collister
14	DF	(England) ENG	Nick Wood
15	MF	(England) ENG	Ryan Fraughan
16	FW	(England) ENG	Jack Mackreth

No.	Pos.	Nation	Player
17	DF	(England) ENG	Liam Darville (until Jan 2011)
17	DF	(England) ENG	Michael Kay (from Jan 2011)
18	DF	(France) FRA	Maxime Blanchard
19	MF	(England) ENG	Kayleden Brown (from Aug to Sep 2010)
20	DF	(England) ENG	Liam Benson
21	FW	(England) ENG	Dale Jennings
22	MF	(England) ENG	Max Power
23	GK	(England) ENG	Andy Coughlin
24	DF	(Ivory Coast) CIV	Zoumana Bakayogo
25	MF	(England) ENG	Joss Labadie
26	FW	(Northern Ireland) NIR	Adam McGurk
27	FW	(England) ENG	Lucas Akins
28	FW	(Northern Ireland) NIR	Sam Morrow
29	DF	(England) ENG	Jermaine Grandison (until Jan 2011)
30	DF	(France) FRA	Arnaud Mendy (until Nov 2010)
31	GK	(Hungary) HUN	Péter Gulácsi (from Sep to Nov 2010)
32	DF	(England) ENG	Scott Wootton (until Jan 2011)
33	GK	(Australia) AUS	Simon Miotto (until Mar 2011)
34	MF	(England) ENG	Sam Mantom (from Nov to Dec 2010)
35	FW	(England) ENG	Lateef Elford-Alliyu (from Nov 2010 to Mar 2011)

== Results ==
=== League One ===
7 August 2010	Tranmere Rovers	1–2	Oldham Athletic	Prenton Park
15:00	Thomas-Moore 89'		Stephens 27', 81'	Attendance: 7,270

14 August 2010	Huddersfield Town	0–0	Tranmere Rovers	Galpharm Stadium
15:00	Naysmith (red card) 86'			Attendance: 13,707

21 August 2010	Tranmere Rovers	0–3	Bournemouth	Prenton Park
15:00			McQuoid 8'; Symes 18' (pen.); Pugh 61'	Attendance: 4,857

28 August 2010	Dagenham & Redbridge	2–2	Tranmere Rovers	Victoria Road
15:00	Vincelot 52'; Arber 71'		Showunmi 78'; Cresswell 88'	Attendance: 2,256

4 September 2010	Tranmere Rovers	1–0	Peterborough United	Prenton Park
15:00	Mendy 44'			Attendance: 4,636

11 September 2010	Yeovil Town	3–1	Tranmere Rovers	Huish Park
15:00	Bowditch 7'; Welsh 11'; Huntington 27'		Thomas-Moore 89' (pen.)	Attendance: 3,364

16 September 2010	Tranmere Rovers	1–1	Charlton Athletic	Prenton Park
15:00	Showunmi 53'		Wagstaff 6'	Attendance: 4,735

25 September 2010	Colchester United	3–1	Tranmere Rovers	Colchester Community Stadium
15:00	Mooney 6'; Wordsworth 16'; Okuonghae 31'		Showunmi 81'	Attendance: 3,637

28 September 2010	Bristol Rovers	0–1	Tranmere Rovers	Memorial Stadium
19:45			Jennings 45'	Attendance: 5,589

2 October 2010	Tranmere Rovers	1–1	Brighton & Hove Albion	Prenton Park
15:00	Cresswell 87'		Murray 35'	Attendance: 5,421

9 October 2010	Southampton	2–0	Tranmere Rovers	St Mary's Stadium
15:00	Lambert 42'; Lallana 56'			Attendance: 19,293

16 October 2010	Tranmere Rovers	0–3	Brentford	Prenton Park
15:00			O'Connor 7' (pen.), 67'; Bean 81'	Attendance: 4,929

23 October 2010	Walsall	1–4	Tranmere Rovers	Bescot Stadium
15:00	Macken 65'		Welsh 34', 88'; Showunmi 59'; Thomas-Moore 78' (pen.)	Attendance: 3,362

30 October 2010	Tranmere Rovers	4–2	Milton Keynes Dons	Prenton Park
15:00	Jennings 3', 25'; Thomas-Moore 22' (pen.), 76'; Bakayogo (red card) 70'		Leven 14' (pen.); Baldock 85'; MacKenzie (red card) 60'	Attendance: 4,512

2 November 2010	Carlisle United	2–0	Tranmere Rovers	Brunton Park
19:45	Berrett 42'; Murphy 49'			Attendance: 3,744

13 November 2010	Tranmere Rovers	1–0	Plymouth Argyle	Prenton Park
15:00	Jennings 60'			Attendance: 4,840

20 November 2010	Notts County	0–1	Tranmere Rovers	Meadow Lane
15:00			Showunmi 50'; Labadie (red card) 75'	Attendance: 5,782

23 November 2010	Tranmere Rovers	0–1	Hartlepool United	Prenton Park
19:45			Gulácsi 77' (o.g.)	Attendance: 4,340

11 December 2010	Tranmere Rovers	1–2	Leyton Orient	Prenton Park
15:00	Wootton 61'		Dawson 10'; McGleish 45'	Attendance: 4,291

1 January 2011	Rochdale	3–2	Tranmere Rovers	Spotland Stadium
15:00	Jones 26' (pen.), 44'; Grant 84'		Broomes (red card) 24'; Labadie 42'; Thomas-Moore 81' (pen.)	Attendance: 5,500

3 January 2011	Tranmere Rovers	2–1	Carlisle United	Prenton Park
15:00	Goodison 39'; Thomas-Moore 80'		Berrett 78'	Attendance: 5,128

8 January 2011	Tranmere Rovers	3–3	Walsall	Prenton Park
15:00	Richards 41' (o.g.); Cresswell 85'; Elford-Alliyu 56'		Richards 32'; Macken 85'; Butler 90'	Attendance: 4,602

15 January 2011	Milton Keynes Dons	2–0	Tranmere Rovers	Stadium:mk
15:00	Powell 46'; Ibehre 70'			Attendance: 8,014

22 January 2011	Tranmere Rovers	2–0	Southampton	Prenton Park
15:00	Welsh 13'; Jennings 60'			Attendance: 5,504

25 January 2011	Swindon Town	0–0	Tranmere Rovers	County Ground
19:45				Attendance: 6,912

1 February 2011	Tranmere Rovers	1–1	Rochdale	Prenton Park
19:45	Elford-Alliyu 4'		Jones 90'	Attendance: 4,766

5 February 2011	Tranmere Rovers	A	Notts County	Prenton Park
15:00	Abandoned: waterlogged pitch (53')		Gow 28'

12 February 2011	Plymouth Argyle	1–3	Tranmere Rovers	Home Park
15:00	Mason 90+1'		Elford-Alliyu 22'; Elford-Alliyu 64'; Showunmi 80'	Attendance: 8,015

15 February 2011	Tranmere Rovers	3–0	Sheffield Wednesday	Prenton Park
15:00	Elford-Alliyu 60'; Goodison 65'; Showunmi 81'		Coke (red card) 64'	Attendance: 5,941

19 February 2011	Peterborough United	2–1	Tranmere Rovers	London Road Stadium
15:00	McCann 53'; Showunmi 70' (o.g.)		Welsh 24'	Attendance: 5,774

22 February 2011	Brentford	2–1	Tranmere Rovers	Griffin Park
19:45	MacDonald 2'; Legge 90'		Labadie 65'	Attendance: 4,192

26 February 2011	Tranmere Rovers	0–1	Yeovil Town	Prenton Park
15:00			Johnson 77'	Attendance: 8,016

1 March 2011	Exeter City	1–1	Tranmere Rovers	St James Park
19:45	Sercombe 65'		Bakayogo 16'	Attendance: 3,456

5 March 2011	Charlton Athletic	1–1	Tranmere Rovers	The Valley
15:00	Llera 54'		Showunmi 26'	Attendance: 14,015

8 March 2011	Tranmere Rovers	0–1	Bristol Rovers	Prenton Park
19:45			Lines 19'	Attendance: 4,110

12 March 2011	Brighton & Hove Albion	2–0	Tranmere Rovers	Withdean Stadium
15:00	Wood 63' (pen.); Murray 71'			Attendance: 7,461

19 March 2011	Tranmere Rovers	1–0	Colchester United	Prenton Park
15:00	Showunmi 53'			Attendance: 4,292

28 March 2011	Oldham Athletic	0–0	Tranmere Rovers	Boundary Park
19:45				Attendance: 3,114

2 April 2011	Tranmere Rovers	0–2	Huddersfield Town	Prenton Park
15:00			Afobe 39'; Novemberak 87'	Attendance: 6,438

5 April 2011	Sheffield Wednesday	4–0	Tranmere Rovers	Hillsborough Stadium
19:45	Miller 10'; Madine 14'; Miller 22' (pen.); Mellor 90+2'			Attendance: 15,235

9 April 2011	Bournemouth	1–2	Tranmere Rovers	Dean Court
15:00	Ings Ings 90+1'		Goodison 41'; McGurk 90+4'	Attendance: 6,004

16 April 2011	Tranmere Rovers	2–0	Dagenham & Redbridge	Prenton Park
15:00	Showunmi 12'; Goodison 34'			Attendance: 4,562

19 April 2011	Tranmere Rovers	0–1	Notts County	Prenton Park
19:45			Westcarr 42' (pen.); Ravenhill (red card) 90+8'	Attendance: 12,249

22 April 2011	Hartlepool United	1–1	Tranmere Rovers	Victoria Park
15:00	Sweeney 14'		Jennings 81'	Attendance: 2,969

25 April 2011	Tranmere Rovers	4–0	Exeter City	Prenton Park
15:00	Kay 44'; Akins 67', 90'; Showunmi 71'			Attendance: 5,017

30 April 2011	Leyton Orient	0–3	Tranmere Rovers	Brisbane Road
15:00		(Report)	Cresswell 8'; McGurk 45', 49'	Referee: Horwood

7 May 2011	Tranmere Rovers	0–2	Swindon Town	Prenton Park
15:00			Jean-François 10'; Timlin 38'	Attendance: 5,302

=== FA Cup ===
6 Nov 2010 Round 1	Bournemouth	5–3	Tranmere Rovers	Dean Court
15:00	McQuoid 1', 4', 57'; Pugh 7'; Feeney 61'		Cresswell 27'; Goodison 42'; Thomas-Moore 53'	Attendance: 3,951

=== League Cup ===
10 Aug 2010 Round 1	Walsall	0–1	Tranmere Rovers	Bescot Stadium
19:45	Goodison 40'			Attendance: 2,253

24 Aug 2010 Round 2	Tranmere Rovers	1–3	Swansea City	Prenton Park
19:45	Showunmi 22'		Van der Gun 73'; Sinclair 74'; Kuqi 90'	Attendance: 2,450

=== Football League Trophy ===
31 Aug 2010 Round 1	Tranmere Rovers	1–1 * (3–5 p)	Accrington Stanley	Prenton Park
19:45	Showunmi 79'		Putterill 55'	Attendance: 2,020
	Penalties
	Fraughan (penalty scored); Showunmi (penalty missed); McGurk (penalty scored); Cresswell (penalty scored)		Joyce (penalty scored); Parkinson (penalty scored); Murphy (penalty scored); Edwards (penalty scored); Ryan (penalty scored) * Disqualified: fielding a suspended player

26 Oct 2010 Round 2	Tranmere Rovers	0–0 (4–3 p)	Stockport County	Prenton Park
19:45				Attendance: 2,223
	Penalties
	Thomas-Moore (penalty scored); Labadie (penalty scored); Wootton (penalty scored); Morrow (penalty scored)		Williams (penalty scored); Donnelly (penalty missed); Turnbull (penalty scored); Tansey (penalty scored); Griffin (penalty missed)

9 Nov 2010 Quarter-Final	Bury	0–1	Tranmere Rovers	Gigg Lane
19:45			Thomas-Moore 8'	Attendance: 1,961

14 Dec 2010 Semi-Final	Tranmere Rovers	0–2	Huddersfield Town	Prenton Park
19:45			Rhodes 18', 67'	Attendance: 2,598

== League table ==
Pos	Team	Pld	W	D	L	GF	GA	GD	Pts
16	Hartlepool United	46	15	12	19	47	65	−18	57
17	Oldham Athletic	46	13	17	16	53	60	−7	56
18	Tranmere Rovers	46	15	11	20	53	60	−7	56
19	Notts County	46	14	8	24	46	60	−14	50
20	Walsall	46	12	12	22	56	75	−19	48

Updated to match(es) played on 2 May 2011. Source: BBC
Rules for classification: 1) points; 2) goal difference; 3) number of goals scored.
