= Nicholas Wood (disambiguation) =

Nicholas Wood (1795–1865) was a British colliery and locomotive engineer.

Nicholas Wood may also refer to:

- Nicholas Wood (merchant) (died 1742), cutler and Member of Parliament for Exeter
- Nicholas Wood (MP) (1832–1892), son of the above, Member of Parliament for Houghton-le-Spring
- Nick Wood (footballer) (born 1990), English football defender
- Nick Wood (rugby union) (born 1983), English rugby union player

== See also ==
- Nicholas Woods, known as Nic Woods (born 1995), New Zealand field hockey player
