= John Welsh (English footballer) =

English footballer (born 1984)

- Welsh in 2026

Personal information
- Full name: John Joseph Welsh
- Date of birth: 10 January 1984 (age 42)
- Place of birth: Wavertree, England
- Height: 5 ft 9 in (1.75 m)
- Position: Midfielder

Youth career
- 1994–2001: Liverpool

Senior career*
Years	Team	Apps	(Gls)
2001–2006	Liverpool	4	(0)
2005–2006	→ Hull City (loan)	20	(2)
2006–2009	Hull City	30	(1)
2008	→ Chester City (loan)	6	(0)
2008	→ Carlisle United (loan)	4	(0)
2009	→ Bury (loan)	5	(0)
2009–2012	Tranmere Rovers	130	(11)
2012–2018	Preston North End	143	(3)
2018–2019	Grimsby Town	13	(0)
2019–2020	Atherton Collieries	19	(0)
2020–2021	Stafford Rangers	28	(1)
Total		402	(18)

International career^{‡}
- England U16
- England U20
2004–2007	England U21	8	(1)
- * Club domestic league appearances and goals as of 00:41, 30 January 2020 (UTC) ‡ National team caps and goals as of 12 March 2006

John Joseph Welsh Sr (born 10 January 1984) is an English football coach and former professional footballer.

As a player, he was a midfielder who notably played in the Premier League for Liverpool, where he began his career before playing for Hull City, Chester City, Carlisle United, Bury, Tranmere Rovers, and Grimsby Town. In 2019, he dropped down to play at semi-professional level with Atherton Collieries before finishing his career with Stafford Rangers.

He was captain of the England under-20 team and has been capped eight times for the under-21s. He represented England U20 at 2003 FIFA World Youth Championship.

== Career ==
=== Liverpool ===
Wavertree born Welsh, joined Liverpool at the age of 10. He progressed through the ranks, becoming captain of the Reserve Team in the process. Welsh trained with the Liverpool first team squad at their Melwood training ground from the middle of the 2001–02 season.

In the 2002–03 season John Welsh played only one game for the first team – his début match against Ipswich Town on 4 December 2002 in a League Cup fourth round tie at home – when he replaced Vladimír Šmicer in the 83rd minute. Also, he was amongst the substitutes for a number of European games.

His first game in Premiership was against Arsenal on 4 October 2003, when he replaced Salif Diao in the 82nd minute, but he couldn't help his team avoid defeat – they lost 2–1, and unfortunately for Welsh, his first act was to be booked for a foul on Ray Parlour. Welsh featured in Liverpool's run to the 2005 UEFA Champions League Final, coming on as a substitute in the round of 16 away tie against Bayer Leverkusen. Liverpool would go on to win the trophy but Welsh was left out of the final match day squad.

=== Hull City ===
After three starts and seven substitute appearances in all competitions for Liverpool, in August 2005, John went on a season-long loan to Championship side Hull City. The club were impressed, and in November 2005 agreed a deal which saw Liverpool take promising young winger Paul Anderson in exchange. The swap took place on 4 January 2006.

However, three minutes into a match against Preston North End on 10 March 2007, Welsh dived into a tackle with Preston's Neil Mellor, a former Liverpool teammate. Welsh was carried off on a stretcher, and it later transpired that he had broken both the tibia and fibula in his right leg, ruling him out for many months.

=== Loans away from Hull ===
On 31 December 2007, Chester City announced they would be signing Welsh on loan when the transfer window reopened the following day. He made his Chester debut on 1 January 2008, in a 2–0 home defeat to Grimsby Town, and spent the rest of the month in Chester's starting line-up before returning to Hull.

He joined Carlisle United on 27 October 2008 for an initial one-month loan making his debut against Hartlepool United.

In March 2009, he joined Football League Two side Bury on loan and was released from Hull on 2 June 2009.

=== Tranmere Rovers ===
In July 2009, Welsh signed a deal with League One side Tranmere Rovers. He had a very consistent season for Tranmere, playing the holding midfield role successfully. Welsh also scored four goals in his first season at Prenton Park, including a volley in the 4–2 victory over Gillingham and a 25-yard strike in a 2–1 home victory over Brighton. The club offered him contract terms for the 2012–13 season.

=== Preston North End ===
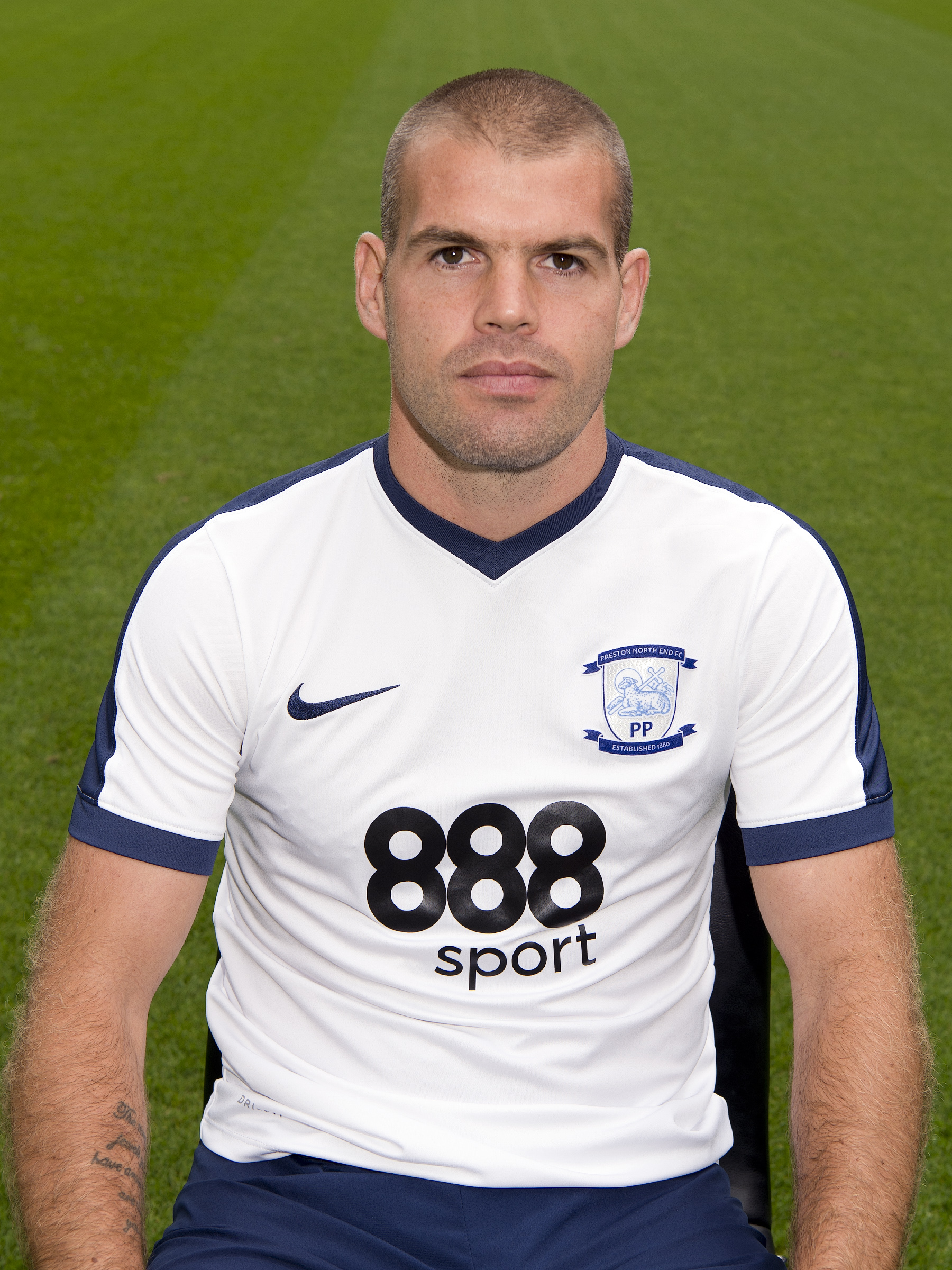
Welsh with Preston North End in 2016.

In May 2012, it was announced that Welsh had signed for Preston North End on a two-year contract. He was voted Player of the Year and Players' Player of the Year of Preston North End for the season 2012/13. On 17 December 2013, Welsh extended his contract with Preston for a further twelve months, thus keeping him at the club until the summer of 2015.

Despite Tom Clarke taking over the captaincy for the 2014–15 season, Welsh still played a major part in getting the club promoted via the play-offs. This form was rewarded with a new two-year contract. At the end of the 2018 season he left Preston North End and was given an award for longest serving Preston player.

=== Grimsby Town ===
Welsh signed a two-year contract with League Two club Grimsby Town on 25 June 2018. He was firmly installed as club captain for the 2018–19 season. Welsh left the club by mutual consent on 20 March 2019.

=== Non-League ===
In October 2019 he joined Atherton Collieries on a short-term contract. It was announced in August 2020 that he had signed for Stafford Rangers.

On 8 October 2021, Welsh announced he was leaving Stafford and subsequently retired in order to focus on other work commitments.

== Coaching career ==
In October 2021, Welsh returned to former club Preston North End as Lead Development Phase Coach.

On 2 January 2026, Welsh was appointed assistant head coach of League Two club Barrow, assisting former Preston North End teammate Paul Gallagher. Having lost their first five matches in charge, the duo departed the club on 11 February.

== Career statistics ==
As of match played 21 August 2018

Appearances and goals by club, season and competition
Club	Season	League			FA Cup		League Cup		Other		Total	
Club	Season	Division	Apps	Goals	Apps	Goals	Apps	Goals	Apps	Goals	Apps	Goals
Liverpool	2002–03	Premier League	0	0	0	0	1	0	0	0	1	0
Liverpool	2003–04	Premier League	1	0	0	0	0	0	1 (Note: Appearance(s) in UEFA Cup)	0	2	0
Liverpool	2004–05	Premier League	3	0	1	0	2	0	1 (Note: Appearances in UEFA Champions League)	0	7	0
Liverpool	Total		4	0	1	0	3	0	2	0	10	0
Hull City (loan)	2005–06	Championship	20	2	0	0	1	0	—		21	2
Hull City	2005–06	Championship	12	0	0	0	0	0	—		12	0
Hull City	2006–07	Championship	18	1	0	0	3	0	—		21	1
Hull City	Total		30	1	0	0	3	0	0	0	33	1
Chester City (loan)	2007–08	League Two	6	0	0	0	0	0	0	0	6	0
Carlisle United (loan)	2008–09	League One	4	0	2	0	0	0	0	0	6	0
Bury (loan)	2008–09	League Two	6	0	0	0	0	0	0	0	6	0
Tranmere Rovers	2009–10	League One	45	4	4	0	2	0	1 (Note: Appearance(s) in Football League Trophy)	0	52	4
Tranmere Rovers	2010–11	League One	41	4	1	0	2	0	4	0	48	4
Tranmere Rovers	2011–12	League One	44	3	1	0	1	0	3	0	49	3
Tranmere Rovers	Total		130	11	6	0	5	0	8	0	149	11
Preston North End	2012–13	League One	36	1	2	0	2	0	2	0	42	1
Preston North End	2013–14	League One	36	2	5	0	1	0	3 (Note: One appearance in the Football League Trophy and two in the League One play-offs)	0	45	2
Preston North End	2014–15	League One	32	0	4	0	1	0	7 (Note: Four appearances in the Football League Trophy and three in the League One play-offs)	0	44	0
Preston North End	2015–16	Championship	24	0	1	0	1	0	—		26	0
Preston North End	2016–17	Championship	6	0	0	0	2	0	—		8	0
Preston North End	2017–18	Championship	9	0	2	0	0	0	0	0	11	0
Preston North End	Total		143	3	14	0	7	0	12	0	176	3
Grimsby Town	2018–19	League Two	4	0	0	0	0	0	1 (Note: Appearance(s) in EFL Trophy)	0	5	0
Career total			347	17	23	0	19	0	23	0	412	17

== Honours ==
Preston North End

- Football League One play-offs: 2015
- Champions League Winner: 2004/05
