= Mustafa Tiryaki =

English footballer (born 1987)

Personal information
- Date of birth: 2 March 1987 (age 39)
- Place of birth: Hackney, London, England
- Positions: Forward; defender

Team information
- Current team: Northwood

Senior career*
Years	Team	Apps	(Gls)
2008–2009	Maidenhead United	21	(10)
2008	→ Potters Bar Town (loan)	4	(2)
2008	→ Godalming Town (loan)	9	(3)
2009–2011	Havant & Waterlooville	75	(23)
2011–2012	Tranmere Rovers	30	(3)
2012	→ Cambridge United (loan)	6	(1)
2012–2014	1461 Trabzon	54	(11)
2014–2015	Göztepe	10	(0)
2015–2016	Boreham Wood	8	(1)
2016–2017	Manisa BB	26	(5)
2017–2018	Wealdstone	2	(0)
2017	Kings Langley	1	(0)
2018–2019	Bedfont Sports	13	(4)
2019	Brimsdown		
2019–2020	Bedfont Sports	6	(0)
2026–	Northwood	1	(0)

Managerial career
- 2019: Brimsdown (player-assistant)
- * Club domestic league appearances and goals as of 12:35, 1 August 2026 (UTC)

Mustafa Tiryaki (born 2 March 1987) is an English footballer who plays as a forward or defender for Northwood.

== Career ==
Tiryaki joined Maidenhead United in 2008 after playing semi-professional football in Turkey. He initially failed to find form and was sent out to Potters Bar Town on loan, scoring two goals in four games. On his return to Maidenhead, he hit a great vein of form. His goalscoring resulted in him being named the club's Player of the Season and resulted in a trial at Cheltenham Town in the summer of 2009. Tiryaki joined Havant & Waterlooville in July 2009, signing a two-year deal with the Conference South club, despite attracting interest from several Conference National sides. He remained at Havant & Waterlooville until June 2011, leaving the club having failed to agree a new deal. During his time at Havant & Waterlooville, Tiryaki scored 23 league goals in 75 appearances.

He spent time on trial at Scunthorpe United in July 2011, scoring in a friendly victory against Bottesford Town, but was ultimately not offered a deal. He then went on trial at Tranmere Rovers twice in the summer of 2011, signing a one-year deal in early August. He made his competitive Football League debut on the first day of the 2011–12 season, starting in Tranmere's 1–0 victory against Chesterfield on 6 August. He scored his first professional goal for Tranmere in a 2–1 home win over Walsall on 22 October 2011. Seven days later after scoring his first goal on 29 October 2011, Tiryaki scored a brace in a 4–2 defeat against Scunthorpe United. In the January transfer window, Tiryaki was linked with Turkish giant Trabzonspor for a reported £100,000 bid. However, the move was never materialise.

On 1 March 2012, Tiryaki was allowed to join Conference National side Cambridge United for a one-month emergency loan. He left the Abbey Stadium at the end of March 2012.

He returned to Tranmere, playing some games towards the end of the season, but was released in May.

After being released by Tranmere, he moved to Turkey by signing a four-year contract for Turkish TFF First League team 1461 Trabzon in June 2012.

In September 2015, Tiryaki moved to National League side Boreham Wood. After this Tiryaki had a short spell in Turkey with Manisa Büyükşehir Belediyespor F.C.

In March 2017, Tiryaki moved to Wealdstone. However, due to issues with international clearance from his former team, he was restricted to only friendly appearances. In late October 2017, international clearance was granted for Tiryaki, allowing him to sign a contract and play in all games for Wealdstone. On 14 November, he joined Kings Langley on dual registration. On 27 March 2018, Tiryaki left Wealdstone and then moved to Bedfont Sports. He left in April 2019 to become a player assistant coach at Brimsdown but returned to Bedfont again on 25 December 2019.

In the summer of 2026, Tiryaki joined Combined Counties Football League side Northwood.

== Personal life ==
Tiryaki is of Turkish Cypriot parentage.

== Career statistics ==
As of match played 9 December 2017

Appearances and goals by club, season and competition
Club	Season	League			National Cup		League Cup		Other		Total	
Club	Season	Division	Apps	Goals	Apps	Goals	Apps	Goals	Apps	Goals	Apps	Goals
Maidenhead United	2008–09	Conference South	21	10	0	0	—		0	0	21	10
Potters Bar Town (loan)	2008–09	IL - Division One North	4	2	0	0	—		0	0	4	2
Godalming Town (loan)	2008–09	IL - Division One South	9	3	0	0	—		0	0	9	3
Havant & Waterlooville	2009–10	Conference South	37	14	2	1	—		3 (Note: Two appearances and three goals in the Hampshire Senior Cup; one appearance and two goals in the FA Trophy)	5	42	20
Havant & Waterlooville	2010–11	Conference South	38	9	4	3	—		5 (Note: Three appearances and a goal in the Hampshire Senior Cup; two appearances and a goal in the FA Trophy)	2	47	14
Havant & Waterlooville	Total		75	23	6	4	0	0	8	7	89	34
Tranmere Rovers	2011–12	League One	30	3	1	0	1	0	3 (Note: Appearances in the Football League Trophy)	1	35	4
Cambridge United (loan)	2011–12	Conference Premier	6	1	—		—		0	0	6	1
1461 Trabzon	2012–13	1. Lig	31	6	6	2	—		0	0	37	8
1461 Trabzon	2013–14	1. Lig	23	5	3	0	—		0	0	26	5
1461 Trabzon	Total		54	11	9	2	0	0	0	0	63	13
Göztepe	2014–15	2. Lig	10	0	1	0	—		0	0	11	0
Boreham Wood	2015–16	National League	8	1	3	1	—		1 (Note: Appearance in the FA Trophy)	1	12	3
Manisa BBSK	2015–16	3. Lig	15	2	0	0	—		0	0	15	2
Manisa BBSK	2016–17	3. Lig	11	3	1	0	—		0	0	12	3
Manisa BBSK	Total		26	5	1	0	0	0	0	0	27	5
Wealdstone (Note: Tiryaki has signed dual-registration deals with Wealdstone and Kings Langley)	2017–18	National League South	2	0	0	0	—		3 (Note: One appearance in the Middlesex Senior Cup: two appearances and a goal in the FA Trophy)	1	5	1
Kings Langley	2017–18	SFL - Premier Division	1	0	0	0	—		0	0	1	0
Career total			246	59	21	7	1	0	15	10	283	78
