= Hilbre High School =

Secondary school in West Kirby, Wirral, England

Hilbre High School Humanities College

Location
- Frankby Road; West Kirby, Wirral, CH48 6EQ; United Kingdom
- 53.374850°N 3.158234°W

Information
- Type: Academy
- Motto: Progress Through Endeavour
- Established: 1973
- Specialist: Humanities
- Department for Education URN: 138355 Tables
- Ofsted: Reports
- Headteacher: John Barlow
- Gender: Coeducational
- Age: 11 to 18
- Enrolment: 1,176
- Capacity: 1,160
- Colours: Black & Purple
- Publication: Hilbre Endeavour
- Website: https://www.hilbre.wirral.sch.uk

Hilbre High School is a co-educational secondary school and sixth form with academy status located in Newton, a suburb of West Kirby on the Wirral Peninsula, England. It is named after the small Hilbre Islands archipelago in the nearby Local Nature Reserve of the same name.

The school has a drama studio theatre and many other drama classrooms funded by the school's specialist Humanities College status. This facility includes a lighting and sound booth which can be used as a recording studio. The school also has a sixth form block. Hilbre High School also has a music block, commonly known to pupils as A block, the main building, and D block.

== Notable former pupils ==
- Chris Boardman, Olympic gold medal winning cyclist
- Joe Collister, Tranmere Rovers F.C. goalkeeper
- The Coral, musicians
- Daniel Craig, actor
- Sam Hughes, footballer for Peterborough United
- Paul Humphreys, musician known for his work as part of OMD
- Miles Kane, musician and one half of The Last Shadow Puppets
- Paul Linwood, Fleetwood Town F.C. player
- The Rascals, musicians
- The Little Flames, musicians
