= 2013–14 Barnsley F.C. season =

Barnsley
2013–14 season
- Chairman: Maurice Watkins
- Manager: David Flitcroft (until 30 November 2013); Danny Wilson (from 17 December 2013)
- Championship: 23rd (relegated)
- FA Cup: Third round
- League Cup: Second round
- Top goalscorer: League: Chris O'Grady (15 goals); All: Chris O'Grady (15 goals)
- Highest home attendance: 16,338 vs. Derby County, 29 December 2013
- Lowest home attendance: 5,238 vs. Scunthorpe United, 6 August 2013
- Average home league attendance: 10,327
Home colours	Away colours	Third colours

The 2013–14 season was Barnsley's eighth consecutive season in the Championship since promotion in 2006.

== Kit ==
Supplier: Nike
Sponsor(s): C.K. Beckett

Home	Away

Last updated: 2 June 2013.
Source: Championship 2013–2014

== Championship data ==
=== League table ===
Pos	Team	Pld	W	D	L	GF	GA	GD	Pts	Promotion, qualification or relegation
20	Blackpool	46	11	13	22	38	66	−28	46	
21	Birmingham City	46	11	11	24	58	74	−16	44	
22	Doncaster Rovers (R)	46	11	11	24	39	70	−31	44	Relegation to Football League One
23	Barnsley (R)	46	9	12	25	44	77	−33	39	Relegation to Football League One
24	Yeovil Town (R)	46	8	13	25	44	75	−31	37	Relegation to Football League One

Source: BBC Sport
Rules for classification: 1) points; 2) goal difference; 3) number of goals scored
(R) Relegated

=== Result summary ===
Overall								Home						Away					
Pld	W	D	L	GF	GA	GD	Pts	W	D	L	GF	GA	GD	W	D	L	GF	GA	GD
46	9	12	25	44	77	−33	39	5	8	10	22	36	−14	4	4	15	22	41	−19

Last updated: 3 May 2014.

=== Result by round ===
Round	1	2	3	4	5	6	7	8	9	10	11	12	13	14	15	16	17	18	19	20	21	22	23	24	25	26	27	28	29	30	31	32	33	34	35	36	37	38	39	40	41	42	43	44	45	46
Ground	H	A	H	A	H	A	A	H	A	H	A	H	H	A	H	A	H	A	A	H	A	H	H	A	H	H	A	H	A	A	H	A	H	H	A	H	A	A	H	H	A	A	H	A	A	H
Result	L	L	D	L	W	L	L	L	L	D	L	W	D	D	D	L	L	W	L	D	D	L	L	D	W	D	L	D	D	L	W	L	W	L	L	L	W	W	D	L	L	W	L	L	L	L
Position	24	24	23	24	20	22	23	23	24	24	24	22	23	22	23	23	24	24	24	24	24	24	24	24	24	23	23	23	23	23	23	24	23	23	24	24	23	22	22	23	24	23	23	23	23	23

Updated to match(es) played on 3 May 2014. Source: Statto.com
A = Away; H = Home; W = Win; D = Draw; L = Loss

== Squad ==
No.	Name	Position (s)	Nationality	Place of birth	Date of birth (age)	Club caps	Club goals	Signed from	Date signed	Fee	Contract end
Goalkeepers
1	Luke Steele	GK	(England)	Peterborough	24 September 1984 (aged 29)	226	0	West Bromwich Albion	21 May 2008	Free	2015
30	Christian Dibble	GK	(Wales)	Wilmslow	11 May 1994 (aged 20)	0	0	Bury	1 July 2014	Free	2014
	Iain Turner	GK	(Scotland)	Stirling	26 January 1984 (aged 30)	0	0	Free agent	30 January 2014	Free	2014
Defenders
2	Bobby Hassell	RB/CB	(England)	Derby	4 June 1980 (aged 34)	284	8	Mansfield Town	1 July 2014	Free	2014
3	Peter Ramage	CB/LB	(England)	Whitley Bay	22 November 1983 (aged 30)	25	0	Crystal Palace	2 September 2013	Loan	2014
4	Tom Kennedy	LB/CB	(England)	Bury	24 June 1985 (aged 29)	75	1	Leicester City	31 August 2012	Free	2015
5	Lewin Nyatanga	CB/LB	(Wales)	Burton upon Trent	18 August 1988 (aged 25)	65	2	Bristol City	9 July 2013	Free	2015
6	Martin Cranie	CB	(England)	Yeovil	23 September 1986 (aged 27)	88	0	Coventry City	20 August 2012	Free	2015
12	Jack Hunt	RB/RW	(England)	Rothwell	6 December 1990 (aged 23)	11	0	Crystal Palace	29 January 2014	Loan	2014
18	Andrai Jones	RB	(England)	Liverpool	1 January 1992 (aged 22)	2	0	Bury	31 January 2013	Free	2014
22	Jean-Yves Mvoto	CB	(France)	Paris	6 September 1988 (aged 25)	30	2	Oldham Athletic	23 July 2013	Free	2015
27	Ryan McLaughlin	RB	(Northern Ireland)	Belfast	30 September 1994 (aged 19)	9	0	Liverpool	9 January 2014	Loan	2014
35	James Bree	DF	(England)	Wakefield	11 October 1997 (aged 16)	1	0	Academy	11 December 2013	Trainee	2017
Midfielders
7	Jim O'Brien	RW/RB	(Republic of Ireland)	Alexandria	28 September 1987 (aged 26)	133	8	Motherwell	1 July 2010	Free	2014
8	Stephen Dawson	CM/RM	(Republic of Ireland)	Dublin	4 December 1985 (aged 28)	86	6	Leyton Orient	31 January 2012	Undisclosed	2014
11	Martin Woods	CM	(Scotland)	Airdrie	1 January 1986 (aged 28)	8	0	Doncaster Rovers	31 January 2014	Free	2014
14	Liam Lawrence	LW/CM	(Republic of Ireland)	Retford	14 December 1982 (aged 31)	14	1	PAOK	16 January 2014	Free	2014
15	Emmanuel Frimpong	DM	(Ghana)	Kumasi	10 January 1992 (aged 22)	9	0	Arsenal	31 January 2014	Undisclosed	2014
16	Dale Jennings	LW/RW	(England)	Liverpool	21 December 1992 (age 33)	27	3	Bayern Munich	18 June 2013	£250,000	2016
17	Paul Digby	CM	(England)	Sheffield	2 February 1995 (aged 19)	9	0	Academy	1 July 2011	Trainee	2017
19	Tomasz Cywka	RW/CM	(Poland)	Gliwice	27 June 1988 (aged 26)	56	9	Reading	6 August 2012	Free	2014
21	Jacob Mellis	CM	(England)	Nottingham	8 January 1991 (aged 23)	89	10	Chelsea	19 June 2012	Free	2014
23	Kelvin Etuhu	CM/WG/CF	(Nigeria)	Kano	30 May 1988 (aged 26)	51	0	Portsmouth	9 June 2012	Free	2014
26	Sam Patterson	WG	(England)		29 October 1993 (aged 20)	0	0	Academy	1 July 2013	Trainee	2014
42	Paddy McCourt	LW/RW	(Northern Ireland)	Derry	16 December 1983 (aged 30)	23	2	Celtic	22 August 2013	Free	2014
Forwards
9	Nick Proschwitz	CF	(Germany)	Weißenfels	28 November 1986 (aged 27)	14	6	Hull City	23 January 2014	Loan	2014
10	Chris O'Grady	CF	(England)	Nottingham	25 January 1986 (aged 28)	59	21	Sheffield Wednesday	19 June 2013	£300,000	2015
24	Reuben Noble-Lazarus	CF/WG	(England)	Huddersfield	16 August 1993 (aged 20)	47	3	Academy	29 September 2008	Trainee	2015
25	Jordan Clark	CF	(England)	Hoyland	22 September 1993 (aged 20)	7	0	Academy	30 May 2011	Trainee	2014
29	John Cofie	CF	(Ghana)	Aboso	21 January 1993 (aged 21)	0	0	Manchester United	19 July 2013	Free	2014
32	Danny Rose	CF	(England)	Barnsley	10 December 1993 (aged 20)	17	2	Academy	30 March 2011	Trainee	2016
37	Rhys Oates	CM	(England)	Pontefract	4 December 1994 (aged 19)	0	0	Academy	1 July 2013	Trainee	2015

=== Statistics ===
As of 3 May 2014

No.	Pos	Nat	Player	Total		Championship		FA Cup		League Cup	
No.	Pos	Nat	Player	Apps	Goals	Apps	Goals	Apps	Goals	Apps	Goals
1	GK	(England) ENG	Luke Steele	33	0	31	0	1	0	1	0
2	DF	(England) ENG	Bobby Hassell	4	0	2+2	0	0	0	0	0
3	DF	(England) ENG	Peter Ramage (on loan from Crystal Palace)	25	0	24	0	1	0	0	0
4	DF	(England) ENG	Tom Kennedy	47	1	44	1	1	0	2	0
5	DF	(Wales) WAL	Lewin Nyatanga	12	0	10+2	0	0	0	0	0
6	DF	(England) ENG	Martin Cranie	37	0	34+1	0	1	0	1	0
7	MF	(Scotland) SCO	Jim O'Brien	32	3	19+10	2	1	1	2	0
8	MF	(Republic of Ireland) IRL	Stephen Dawson	40	2	29+8	1	1	0	2	1
9	FW	(Germany) GER	Nick Proschwitz (on loan from Hull City)	14	4	8+6	4	0	0	0	0
10	FW	(England) ENG	Chris O'Grady	43	15	39+1	15	1	0	2	0
11	MF	(Scotland) SCO	Martin Woods	8	0	6+2	0	0	0	0	0
12	DF	(England) ENG	Jack Hunt (on loan from Crystal Palace)	11	0	9+2	0	0	0	0	0
14	MF	(Republic of Ireland) IRL	Liam Lawrence	14	1	10+4	1	0	0	0	0
15	MF	(Ghana) GHA	Emmanuel Frimpong	9	0	6+3	0	0	0	0	0
16	FW	(England) ENG	Dale Jennings	27	3	24+3	3	0	0	0	0
17	MF	(England) ENG	Paul Digby	5	0	2+3	0	0	0	0	0
18	DF	(England) ENG	Andrai Jones	0	0	0	0	0	0	0	0
19	MF	(Poland) POL	Tomasz Cywka	33	4	15+15	4	1	0	0+2	0
21	MF	(England) ENG	Jacob Mellis	33	2	24+6	2	1	0	2	0
22	DF	(France) FRA	Jean-Yves Mvoto	30	2	25+3	2	1	0	1	0
23	MF	(Nigeria) NGR	Kelvin Etuhu	21	0	16+4	0	0	0	1	0
24	FW	(England) ENG	Reuben Noble-Lazarus	12	1	2+10	1	0	0	0	0
25	FW	(England) ENG	Jordan Clark	0	0	0	0	0	0	0	0
26	MF	(England) ENG	Sam Patterson	0	0	0	0	0	0	0	0
27	MF	(England) ENG	Ryan McLaughlin (on loan from Liverpool)	9	0	9	0	0	0	0	0
29	FW	(England) ENG	John Cofie	0	0	0	0	0	0	0	0
30	GK	(Wales) WAL	Christian Dibble	0	0	0	0	0	0	0	0
31	GK	(Scotland) SCO	Iain Turner	0	0	0	0	0	0	0	0
32	FW	(England) ENG	Danny Rose	3	0	1+2	0	0	0	0	0
35	MF	(England) ENG	James Bree	1	0	0+1	0	0	0	0	0
37	FW	(England) ENG	Rhys Oates	0	0	0	0	0	0	0	0
42	MF	(Northern Ireland) NIR	Paddy McCourt	23	2	15+8	2	0	0	0	0
Players who left the club during the season:
3	DF	(England) ENG	Scott Golbourne	6	0	4	0	0	0	2	0
9	FW	(Trinidad and Tobago) TTO	Jason Scotland	23	2	4+16	2	0+1	0	0+2	0
11	MF	(England) ENG	David Perkins	25	0	22+1	0	1	0	1	0
12	GK	(England) ENG	Jack Butland (on loan from Stoke City)	13	0	13	0	0	0	0	0
13	FW	(England) ENG	Chris Dagnall	10	1	5+3	1	0	0	1+1	0
14	DF	(England) ENG	Scott Wiseman	25	0	23	0	0	0	1+1	0
15	DF	(Scotland) SCO	Jimmy McNulty	1	0	0	0	0	0	1	0
20	FW	(Norway) NOR	Marcus Pedersen (on loan from Vitesse Arnhem)	20	2	12+6	2	0+1	0	1	0
31	GK	(England) ENG	Mike Pollitt (on loan from Wigan Athletic)	3	0	2	0	0	0	1	0
33	FW	(United States) USA	Brek Shea (on loan from Stoke City)	8	0	5+3	0	0	0	0	0
34	MF	(England) ENG	David Fox (on loan from Norwich City)	7	0	7	0	0	0	0	0
50	FW	(England) ENG	Marcus Tudgay (on loan from Nottingham Forest)	5	1	5	1	0	0	0	0

==== Captains ====
As of 30 November 2013

No.	P	Name	Country	No. games	Notes
6	DF	Martin Cranie	(England)	13	
8	MF	Stephen Dawson	(Republic of Ireland)	6	

Source: Competitive match reports.
Competitive matches only
Matches started as captain only
Country: FIFA nationality; No.: Squad number; P: Position; Name: Player name; No. Games: Number of games started as captain.

==== Goalscorers ====
As of 3 May 2014

Rank	No.	Pos.	Name	Championship	FA Cup	League Cup	Total
1	10	FW	Chris O'Grady	15	0	0	15
2	19	MF	Tomasz Cywka	4	0	0	4
2	9	FW	Nick Proschwitz	4	0	0	4
4	7	MF	Jim O'Brien	2	1	0	3
4	16	MF	Dale Jennings	3	0	0	3
6	8	MF	Stephen Dawson	1	0	1	2
6	9	FW	Jason Scotland	2	0	0	2
6	20	FW	Marcus Pedersen	2	0	0	2
6	42	MF	Paddy McCourt	2	0	0	2
6	22	DF	Jean-Yves Mvoto	2	0	0	2
6	21	MF	Jacob Mellis	2	0	0	2
11	13	FW	Chris Dagnall	1	0	0	1
11	24	FW	Reuben Noble-Lazarus	1	0	0	1
11	50	FW	Marcus Tudgay	1	0	0	1
11	4	DF	Tom Kennedy	1	0	0	1
11	14	MF	Liam Lawrence	1	0	0	1
Total				44	1	1	46

==== Disciplinary record ====
As of 3 May 2014

No.	Pos.	Name	Championship		FA Cup		League Cup		Total	
No.	Pos.	Name	Yellow card	Red card	Yellow card	Red card	Yellow card	Red card	Yellow card	Red card
1	GK	Luke Steele	2	0	0	0	0	0	2	0
3	DF	Peter Ramage	2	0	0	0	0	0	2	0
5	DF	Lewin Nyatanga	2	0	0	0	0	0	2	0
6	DF	Martin Cranie	5	0	0	0	0	0	5	0
7	MF	Jim O'Brien	5	0	0	0	0	0	5	0
8	MF	Stephen Dawson	8	0	1	0	0	0	9	0
9	FW	Jason Scotland	2	0	0	0	0	0	2	0
9	FW	Nick Proschwitz	1	0	0	0	0	0	1	0
10	FW	Chris O'Grady	2	0	0	0	0	0	2	0
11	MF	David Perkins	2	0	0	0	0	0	2	0
12	GK	Jack Butland	2	0	0	0	0	0	2	0
12	DF	Jack Hunt	4	0	0	0	0	0	4	0
13	FW	Chris Dagnall	1	0	0	0	0	0	1	0
14	DF	Scott Wiseman	3	0	0	0	0	0	3	0
14	MF	Liam Lawrence	2	0	0	0	0	0	2	0
15	MF	Emmanuel Frimpong	5	1	0	0	0	0	5	1
16	FW	Dale Jennings	1	1	0	0	0	0	1	1
20	FW	Marcus Pedersen	2	0	0	0	0	0	2	0
21	MF	Jacob Mellis	8	1	0	0	0	0	8	1
22	DF	Jean-Yves Mvoto	1	1	0	0	0	0	1	1
23	MF	Kelvin Etuhu	2	1	0	0	0	0	2	1
42	MF	Paddy McCourt	3	0	0	0	0	0	3	0
50	MF	Marcus Tudgay	1	1	0	0	0	0	1	1
Total			66	6	1	0	0	0	67	6

==== Suspensions served ====
As of 1 January 2014

Date	Matches Missed	Player	Reason	Opponents Missed
3 August 2013	3	Dale Jennings	(red card) vs Wigan	Scunthorpe (LC), Blackpool (A), Charlton (H)
24 August 2013	1	Jean-Yves Mvoto	(red card) vs Blackburn	Southampton (LC)
21 December 2013	1	Jacob Mellis	(yellow card) (yellow card) (yellow card) (yellow card) (yellow card) vs Leeds United	Bolton Wanderers (H)
21 December 2013	3	Marcus Tudgay	(red card) vs Leeds United	Bolton Wanderers (H), Derby County (H), Birmingham City (A)

=== Contracts ===
As of 30 June 2014

No.	Pos.	Nat.	Name	Age	Status	Contract length	Expiry date	Source
25	DF	(England)	Martin Cranie	26	Signed	2 years	June 2015	Sky Sports
19	MF	(Poland)	Tomasz Cywka	24	Signed	1 year	June 2014	Barnsley FC
23	FW	(Nigeria)	Kelvin Etuhu	25	Extended	1 year	June 2014	Barnsley Chronicle
2	DF	(England)	Bobby Hassell	33	Signed	1 year	June 2014	BBC Sport
33	DF	(England)	Tom Kennedy	27	Signed	2 years	June 2015	BBC Sport
15	DF	(Scotland) (England)	Jimmy McNulty	28	Signed	1 year	June 2014	BBC Sport
9	FW	(Trinidad and Tobago)	Jason Scotland	34	Signed	1 year	June 2014	BBC Sport
1	GK	(England)	Luke Steele	28	Signed	2 years	June 2015	BBC Sport
17	MF	(England)	Paul Digby	18	Signed	4 years	June 2017	Sky Sports
32	FW	(England)	Danny Rose	20	Signed	2 years	June 2016	
37	FW	(England)	Rhys Oates	19	Signed	1 year	June 2015	

== Transfers ==
As of 29 June 2014

=== In ===
No.	Pos.	Nat.	Name	Age	EU	Moving from	Type	Transfer window	Ends	Transfer fee	Source
16	FW	(England)	Dale Jennings	20	EU	Bayern Munich (Germany)	Transfer	Summer	2016	£250,000	
10	FW	(England)	Chris O'Grady	27	EU	Sheffield Wednesday	Transfer	Summer	2015	£300,000	
30	GK	(Wales) (England)	Christian Dibble	19	EU	Bury	Free Transfer	Summer	2014	Free	
	MF	(England)	Wade Joyce	18	EU	Sunderland	Free Transfer	Summer	2014	Free	
5	DF	(Wales) (England)	Lewin Nyatanga	24	EU	Bristol City	Free Transfer	Summer	2015	Free	
29	FW	(Ghana)	John Cofie	20	EU	Manchester United	Free Transfer	Summer	2014	Free	
22	DF	(France)	Jean-Yves Mvoto	24	EU	Oldham Athletic	Free Transfer	Summer	2015	Free	
20	FW	(Norway)	Marcus Pedersen	23	EU	Vitesse Arnhem (Netherlands)	Loan	Summer	2014	Season Long Loan	
42	MF	(Northern Ireland)	Paddy McCourt	29	EU	Celtic (Scotland)	Free Transfer	Summer	2014	Free	
3	DF	(England)	Peter Ramage	29	EU	Crystal Palace	Loan	Summer	2014	Season Long Loan	
14	MF	(Republic of Ireland) (England)	Liam Lawrence	31	EU	PAOK (Greece)	Free Transfer	Winter	2014	Free	
9	FW	(Germany)	Nick Proschwitz	27	EU	Hull City	Loan	Winter	2014	Season Long Loan	
31	GK	(Scotland)	Iain Turner	30	EU	Free agent	Free Transfer	Winter	2014	Free	
15	MF	(Ghana)	Emmanuel Frimpong	22	EU	Arsenal	Transfer	Winter	2014	Undisclosed	
11	MF	(Scotland)	Martin Woods	28	EU	Free agent	Free Transfer	Winter	2014	Free	

=== Loans in ===
No.	Pos.	Name	Country	Age	Loan club	Started	Ended	Start source	End source
31	GK	Mike Pollitt	(England)	41	Wigan Athletic	27 August	26 September		
12	GK	Jack Butland	(England)	20	Stoke City	26 September	26 December		
34	MF	David Fox	(England)	29	Norwich City	27 September	9 November		
50	FW	Marcus Tudgay	(England)	30	Nottingham Forest	28 November	3 January		
33	MF	Brek Shea	(United States)	24	Stoke City	1 January	10 March		
27	DF	Ryan McLaughlin	(Northern Ireland)	19	Liverpool	9 January	30 May		
12	DF	Jack Hunt	(England)	23	Crystal Palace	29 January			

Sources: For loan start source see "Start source". For loan end source see "End source".
EU = if holds or not a European Union passport; Country: when 2 flags, 1st flag = country that plays for internationally, 2nd flag = country of birth; No. = number on jersey; P = Position (for position name, pause mouse pointer on abbreviation); Name = Name on jersey (for more extensive name, pause mouse pointer on name); In/Out = In: The player came in on loan, Out: The player went out on loan; Loan club = the club that the player moved on loan to or the club that the player came from on loan; Started = the date when the player's loan started; Ended = the date when the player's loan ended.

=== Out ===
No.	Pos.	Name	Country	Age	Type	Moving to	Transfer window	Transfer fee	Apps	Goals	Source
10	MF	Matt Done	(England)	24	Contract Ended	Rochdale	Summer	Free	48	4	
4	DF	Rob Edwards	(Wales) (England)	30	Contract Ended	Free agent	Summer	Free	18	0	
6	DF	Stephen Foster	(England)	32	Contract Ended	Tranmere Rovers	Summer	Free	244	12	
26	MF	John Rooney	(England)	22	Contract Ended	Bury	Summer	Free	1	0	
16	FW	Marlon Harewood	(England)	33	Contract Ended	Bristol City	Summer	Free	46	7	
30	GK	Lukas Lidakevicius	(Lithuania)	20	Contract Ended	Free agent	Summer	Free	0	0	
20	MF	Toni Silva	(Portugal)	19	Contract Terminated	CSKA Sofia (Bulgaria)	Summer	Free	1	0	
3	DF	Scott Golbourne	(England)	25	Transfer	Wolverhampton Wanderers	Summer	Undisclosed	53	2	
12	GK	Ben Alnwick	(England)	26	Contract Terminated	Charlton Athletic	Summer	Free	12	0	
27	MF	Dennis Knight	(England)	19	Contract Terminated	West Auckland Town		Free	0	0	
28	DF	Jake Scott	(England)	20	Contract Terminated	Free agent		Free	0	0	
—	MF	Wade Joyce	(England)	19	Contract Ended	St Johnstone (Scotland)	Winter	Free	0	0	
13	FW	Chris Dagnall	(England)	27	Contract Terminated	Leyton Orient	Winter	Free	61	11	
14	DF	Scott Wiseman	(Gibraltar) (England)	28	Contract Terminated	Preston North End	Winter	Free	111	1	
11	MF	David Perkins	(England)	31	Free Transfer	Blackpool	Winter	Free	100	2	
15	DF	Jimmy McNulty	(Scotland) (England)	28	Contract Terminated	Bury	Winter	Free	61	2	
9	FW	Jason Scotland	(Trinidad and Tobago)	34	Contract Terminated	Hamilton Academical (Scotland)	Winter	Free	43	8	

EU = if holds or not a European Union passport; Country: when 2 flags, 1st flag = country that plays for internationally, 2nd flag = country of birth; N = number on jersey; P = Position (for position name, pause mouse pointer on abbreviation); Name = Name on jersey (for more extensive name, pause mouse pointer on name); Age = age on the day of the signing; Moving from = only indicate the club the player was playing before start playing for this club in this season, for the type of the moving see Status column; Moving to = only indicates the club the player is going to play next, for the type of the moving see Status column; Ends = when the player's current contract ends; n/a = Not applicable; Apps = Total number of competitive appearances (including substitute appearances) at the club prior to departure; Goals = Total number of competitive goals scored at the club prior to departure.

=== Loans out ===
No.	Pos.	Name	Country	Age	Loan club	Started	Ended	Start source	End source
25	FW	Jordan Clark	(England)	19	Scunthorpe United	2 August	11 September		
18	DF	Andrai Jones	(England)	21	Tranmere Rovers	17 August	16 September		
37	FW	Rhys Oates	(England)	18	Gainsborough Trinity	31 August	30 September		
15	DF	Jimmy McNulty	(Scotland) (England)	28	Tranmere Rovers	3 October	2 January		
24	FW	Reuben Noble-Lazarus	(England)	20	Scunthorpe United	12 November	2 January		
—	MF	Brad Abbott	(England)	19	Harrogate Town	22 November	3 January		
—	MF	McCauley Shillito	(England)	18	Frickley Athletic	23 November	23 December		
26	MF	Sam Patterson	(England)	20	Halifax Town	26 November	5 January		
—	MF	Wade Joyce	(England)	18	Oldham Athletic	28 November	28 December		
16	FW	Dale Jennings	(England)	20	Milton Keynes Dons	28 November	1 January		
13	FW	Chris Dagnall	(England)	27	Coventry City	28 November	1 January		
37	FW	Rhys Oates	(England)	19	Stockport County	31 January	1 March		
30	GK	Christian Dibble	(Wales) (England)	19	Stockport County	31 January	1 March		
25	FW	Jordan Clark	(England)	20	Hyde	8 February	8 March		
18	DF	Andrai Jones	(England)	22	Alfreton Town	21 February	22 February		
25	FW	Jordan Clark	(England)	20	Bury	27 March	22 April		

Sources: For loan start source see "Start source". For loan end source see "End source".
EU = if holds or not a European Union passport; Country: when 2 flags, 1st flag = country that plays for internationally, 2nd flag = country of birth; No. = number on jersey; P = Position (for position name, pause mouse pointer on abbreviation); Name = Name on jersey (for more extensive name, pause mouse pointer on name); In/Out = In: The player came in on loan, Out: The player went out on loan; Loan club = the club that the player moved on loan to or the club that the player came from on loan; Started = the date when the player's loan started; Ended = the date when the player's loan ended.

== Fixtures & results ==
=== Pre-season ===
11 July 2013 Friendly	Barnsley	2–2	Dinamo București	N/A
18:00 BST

12 July 2013 Friendly	Barnsley	1–1	Club Brugge	Barnsley
19:00 BST	Dagnall 10'	Report	Vázquez 11'	Stadium: Oakwell; Referee: Craig Pawson

20 July 2013 Friendly	Barnsley	2–2	Wolverhampton Wanderers	Barnsley
15:00 BST	Mellis 5'; O'Grady 58'	Report	Ismail 2'; Batth 20'	Stadium: Oakwell

24 July 2013 Friendly	Eastwood Town	0–2	Barnsley XI	Eastwood
19:00 BST		Report	Oates; Hassell	Stadium: Coronation Park

27 July 2013 Friendly	Rotherham United	2–3	Barnsley	Rotherham
15:00 BST	Agard 75', 77'	Report	46', 55' Mellis; 67' Dagnall	Stadium: New York Stadium

=== Championship ===
3 August 2013 1	Barnsley	0–4	Wigan Athletic	Barnsley
15:00 BST	Jennings (red card) 66'	BBC Sport	37' Watson; 55' Holt; 80' Barnett; 88' Maloney	Stadium: Oakwell; Attendance: 13,096; Referee: Geoff Eltringham

10 August 2013 2	Blackpool	1–0	Barnsley	Blackpool
15:00 BST	Wiseman 90' (o.g.)	Report		Stadium: Bloomfield Road; Attendance: 14,268; Referee: Stephen Martin

17 August 2013 3	Barnsley	2–2	Charlton Athletic	Barnsley
15:00 BST	O'Grady 16', 55'	Report	64' Cousins; 72' Church	Stadium: Oakwell; Attendance: 9,554; Referee: Jeremy Simpson

24 August 2013 4	Blackburn Rovers	5–2	Barnsley	Blackburn
15:00 BST	Cairney 17'; Rhodes 30', 39'; King 43'; Kane 58'	Report	13' Dagnall; 72' Cywka	Stadium: Ewood Park; Attendance: 13,058; Referee: Mark Heywood

31 August 2013 5	Barnsley	2–1	Huddersfield Town	Barnsley
15:00 BST	O'Grady 8'; Pedersen 52'	Report	61' Vaughan	Stadium: Oakwell; Attendance: 13,593; Referee: Mason

14 September 2013 6	Nottingham Forest	3–2	Barnsley	Nottingham
15:00 BST	Cox 18'; Etuhu 45+3' (o.g.); Henderson 84'	Report	20' (pen.) O'Grady; 69' Cywka	Stadium: City Ground; Attendance: 21,181; Referee: Williamson

17 September 2013 7	Bournemouth	1–0	Barnsley	Bournemouth
19:45 BST	Pugh 78'	Report		Stadium: Dean Court; Attendance: 7,574; Referee: Malone

21 September 2013 8	Barnsley	1–5	Watford	Barnsley
15:00 BST	Scotland 14'	Report	7' Deeney; 18' Faraoni; 43' Forestieri; 69' Sean Murray; 79' Anya	Stadium: Oakwell; Attendance: 9,850; Referee: Clark

28 September 2013 9	Leicester City	2–1	Barnsley	Leicester
15:00 BST	Nugent 50', 62' (pen.)	Report	73' Scotland	Stadium: King Power Stadium; Attendance: 21,591; Referee: Phil Gibbs

1 October 2013 10	Barnsley	1–1	Reading	Barnsley
19:45 BST	O'Grady 79'	Report	51' Robson-Kanu	Stadium: Oakwell; Attendance: 9,084; Referee: Chris Sarginson

5 October 2013 11	Queens Park Rangers	2–0	Barnsley	London
15:00 BST	Austin 66', 87' (pen.)	Report		Stadium: Loftus Road; Attendance: 16,202; Referee: David Phillips

19 October 2013 12	Barnsley	3–2	Middlesbrough	Barnsley
15:00 BST	McCourt 26'; O'Grady 41', 43' (pen.)	Report	82', 84' Adomah	Stadium: Oakwell; Attendance: 11,438; Referee: Oliver Langford

26 October 2013 13	Barnsley	1–1	Sheffield Wednesday	Barnsley
15:00 BST	Pedersen 16'	Report	60' Fryatt	Stadium: Oakwell; Attendance: 13,268; Referee: Bobby Madley

2 November 2013 14	Ipswich Town	1–1	Barnsley	Ipswich
15:00 BST	Murphy 41'; Cresswell (red card) 90'	Report	70' O'Brien	Stadium: Portman Road; Attendance: 18,361; Referee: Andy D'Urso

9 November 2013 15	Barnsley	0–0	Doncaster Rovers	Barnsley
15:00 BST		Report		Stadium: Oakwell; Attendance: 11,843; Referee: Kevin Friend

23 November 2013 16	Millwall	1–0	Barnsley	London
15:00 BST	Wiseman 75' (o.g.)	Report		Stadium: The Den; Attendance: 9,057; Referee: Keith Hill

30 November 2013 17	Barnsley	0–3	Birmingham City	Barnsley
15:00 BST		Report	13', 22' (pen.) Caddis; 37' Žigić	Stadium: Oakwell; Attendance: 10,077; Referee: Kevin Wright

3 December 2013 18	Brighton & Hove Albion	1–2	Barnsley	Brighton
19:45	Upson 63'	Report	35' McCourt; 50' Mellis	Stadium: AMEX Stadium; Attendance: 25,759

7 December 2013 19	Burnley	1–0	Barnsley	Burnley
15:00 BST	Kightly 65'	Report		Stadium: Turf Moor; Attendance: 11,462; Referee: James Adcock

14 December 2013 20	Barnsley	1–1	Yeovil Town	Barnsley
15:00 BST	Tudgay 34' (pen.)	Report	Grant 10'	Stadium: Oakwell; Attendance: 13,361; Referee: Lee Probert

21 December 2013 21	Leeds United	0–0	Barnsley	Leeds
15:00 GMT		Report	Tudgay (red card) 84'	Stadium: Elland Road; Attendance: 31,031; Referee: Keith Stroud

26 December 2013 22	Barnsley	0–1	Bolton Wanderers	Barnsley
15:00 GMT		Report	Danns 64'	Stadium: Oakwell; Attendance: 12,484; Referee: Andy Haines

29 December 2013 23	Barnsley	1–2	Derby County	Barnsley
15:00 GMT	Cywka 62'	Report	Martin 8', 49'	Stadium: Oakwell; Attendance: 16,338; Referee: Mark Heywood

1 January 2014 24	Birmingham City	1–1	Barnsley	Birmingham
15:00 GMT	Zigic 10'	Report	Mellis 61'	Stadium: St Andrew's; Attendance: 14,422; Referee: Chris Foy

18 January 2014 25	Barnsley	2–0	Blackpool	Barnsley
15:00	O'Grady 45' (pen.) 48'; O'Brien (yellow card) 72'	Report	Osbourne (yellow card) 5'; Bishop (yellow card) 22'; Robinson (yellow card) 45+2'; Davies (yellow card) 56'	Stadium: Oakwell; Attendance: 9,866; Referee: Robert Lewis

28 January 2014 26	Barnsley	2–2	Blackburn Rovers	Barnsley
19:45	Dawson (yellow card) 28'; Proschwitz 29'; Grady 69' (pen.)	Report	Cairney 36'; Gestede 44'; Lowe (yellow card) 58'	Stadium: Oakwell Stadium; Attendance: 9,703; Referee: Seb Stockbridge

1 February 2014 27	Sheffield Wednesday	1–0	Barnsley	Sheffield
15:00	Maguire (yellow card) 46' (goal) 90+7'; J. Johnson (red card) 80'	Report	Frimpong (yellow card) 24' (red card) 30'; Hunt (yellow card) 53'; Mellis (red card) 90+1'	Stadium: Hillsborough Stadium; Attendance: 25,139; Referee: A. Marriner

8 February 2014 28	Barnsley	2–2	Ipswich Town	Barnsley
15:00	O'Grady 12'; Cywka 74'	Report	Berra 81'; McGoldrick 84'	Stadium: Oakwell; Attendance: 9,929; Referee: Darren Bond

15 February 2014 29	Doncaster Rovers	2–2	Barnsley	Doncaster
15:00	Coppinger 45', 55'	Report	Proschwitz 27', 89'; Cranie (yellow card) 38'	Stadium: Keepmoat Stadium; Attendance: 10,216; Referee: Andy D'Urso

18 February 2014 30	Wigan Athletic	2–0	Barnsley	Wigan
15.00 GMT	Maynard 35'; Waghorn 44'; Perch (yellow card) 62'	Report	Nyatanga (yellow card) 63'; O'Brein (yellow card) 77'; Frimpong (yellow card) 90+4'	Stadium: DW Stadium; Attendance: 14,121; Referee: Nigel Miller

22 February 2014 31	Barnsley	1–0	Millwall	Barnsley
15:00 GMT	O'Brien 35'; Frimpong (yellow card) 87'	Report	McDonald (yellow card) 69'; Bessone (yellow card) 89'	Stadium: Oakwell; Attendance: 9,653; Referee: Mark Brown

1 March 2014 32	Huddersfield Town	5–0	Barnsley	Huddersfield
15:00 GMT	Southern 29'; Ward 32'; Hammill 48'; Clayton 58' (pen.); Scannell 86'	Report	Hunt (yellow card) 29'; Proschwitz (yellow card) 34'; Steele (yellow card) 57'; Frimpong (yellow card) 62'	Stadium: John Smith's Stadium; Attendance: 14,236; Referee: David Coote

8 March 2014 33	Barnsley	1–0	Nottingham Forest	Barnsley
15:00 GMT	Jennings 51'; Hunt (yellow card) 61'; Steele (yellow card) 64'; Dawson (yellow card) 74'; Mellis (yellow card) 86'	Report	(yellow card) 9' Gomis; (yellow card) 29' Fox	Stadium: Oakwell; Attendance: 12,157; Referee: Keith Stroud

11 March 2014 34	Barnsley	0–3	Leicester City	Barnsley
19:45 GMT		Report	Vardy 21', 62'; Drinkwater 58'	Stadium: Oakwell; Attendance: 12,539; Referee: Mark Heywood

15 March 2014 35	Watford	3–0	Barnsley	Watford
15:00 GMT	Battocchio 5'; Deeney 16'; Pudil (yellow card) 36'; Merkel 74'	Report	Dawson (yellow card) 28'; Mellis (yellow card) 55'	Stadium: Vicarage Road; Attendance: 14,531; Referee: Graham Salisbury

22 March 2014 36	Barnsley	0–1	Bournemouth	Barnsley
15:00 GMT	Hunt (yellow card) 45+1'; Nyatanga (yellow card) 80'	Report	Ritchie (yellow card) 45+1'; Cook 90+4'	Stadium: Oakwell; Attendance: 9,392; Referee: Scott Mathieson

25 March 2014 37	Reading	1–3	Barnsley	Reading
19:45 GMT	Pogrebnyak 20' (pen.)	Report	Dawson 16'; Dawson (yellow card) 45+1'; Noble-Lazarus 53'; Jennings 57'; Frimpong (yellow card) 83'	Stadium: Madejski Stadium; Attendance: 16,645; Referee: Steve Martin

29 March 2014 38	Yeovil Town	1–4	Barnsley	Yeovil
15:00 GMT		Report		Stadium: Huish Park; Attendance: 6,579; Referee: Roger East

5 April 2014 39	Barnsley	0–0	Brighton & Hove Albion	Barnsley
15:00 BST	Lawrence (yellow card) 40'; Etuhu (yellow card) 74' (yellow-red card) 76'	Report	Ward (yellow card) 21'; Rodríguez Sánchez (yellow card) 30'; Ulloa (yellow card) 42'	Stadium: Oakwell; Attendance: 10,195; Referee: Tony Harrington

8 April 2014 40	Barnsley	0–1	Burnley	Barnsley
19:45 BST		Report		Stadium: Oakwell; Attendance: 12,904; Referee: Neil Swarbrick

12 April 2014 41	Bolton Wanderers	1–0	Barnsley	Bolton
15:07 BST	Beckford 44'	Report		Stadium: Reebok Stadium; Attendance: 15,845; Referee: James Adcock

15 April 2014 42	Charlton Athletic	1–2	Barnsley	London
19:45 BST	Ajdarevic 90'	Report	Jean-Yves Mvoto 32'; Kennedy 63'	Stadium: The Valley; Attendance: 16,320; Referee: Iain Williamson

19 April 2014 43	Barnsley	0–1	Leeds United	Barnsley
15:00 BST		Report	McCormack 16'	Stadium: Oakwell; Attendance: 15,190; Referee: David Webb

21 April 2014 44	Derby County	2–1	Barnsley	Derby
15:00 BST	Hendrick 34'; Russell 42'	Report	Proschwitz 80'	Stadium: iPro Stadium; Attendance: 26,046; Referee: Graham Scott

26 April 2014 45	Middlesbrough	3–1	Barnsley	Middlesbrough
15:00 BST	Tomlin 54', 90+3'; Graham 90'	Report	Mvoto 53'	Stadium: Riverside Stadium; Attendance: 14,867; Referee: Darren Drysdale

3 May 2014 46	Barnsley	2–3	Queens Park Rangers	Barnsley
12:15 BST	O'Grady 54', 90'	Report	Austin 42'; Mvoto 43' (o.g.); Yun 68'	Stadium: Oakwell; Attendance: 10,298; Referee: Kevin Wright

=== League Cup ===
6 August 2013 Round 1	Barnsley	0–0 (a.e.t.) (5–4 p)	Scunthorpe United	Barnsley
19:45 BST		BBC Sport		Stadium: Oakwell; Attendance: 5,238; Referee: Paul Tierney
	Penalties
	Dagnall (penalty missed); Scotland (penalty missed); Cywka (penalty scored); Dawson (penalty scored); Perkins (penalty scored); Steele (penalty missed); O'Brien (penalty missed); Golbourne (penalty scored); O'Grady (penalty scored)		(penalty missed) Hawkridge; (penalty scored) Collins; (penalty missed) Sparrow; (penalty scored) Iwelumo; (penalty scored) Godden; (penalty missed) Welsh; (penalty missed) Slocombe; (penalty scored) Mirfin; (penalty missed) Canavan

27 August 2013 Round 2	Barnsley	1–5	Southampton	Barnsley
19:45 BST	Dawson 53'	Report	26', 89' (pen.) S Davies; 49' Rodriguez; 66' Mayuka; 90' Ramírez	Stadium: Oakwell; Attendance: 6,574

=== FA Cup ===
4 January 2014 Third Round	Barnsley	1–2	Coventry City	Barnsley
15:00	O'Brien 19'; Dawson (yellow card) 29'	report	Moussa 78', (yellow card) 32'; L. Clarke 89', (yellow card) 30'; Christie (yellow card) 43'	Stadium: Oakwell; Attendance: 7,439 (2,632 away fans); Referee: Carl Boyeson

== Overall summary ==
=== Summary ===
As 3 May 2014

Games played	49 (46 Championship, 1 FA Cup, 2 League Cup)
Games won	9 (9 Championship, 0 FA Cup, 0 League Cup)
Games drawn	14 (13 Championship, 0 FA Cup, 1 League Cup)
Games lost	27 (25 Championship, 1 FA Cup, 1 League Cup)
Goals scored	46 (44 Championship, 1 FA Cup, 1 League Cup)
Goals conceded	84 (77 Championship, 2 FA Cup, 5 League Cup)
Goal difference	−38
Clean sheets	6 (5 Championship, 0 FA Cup, 1 League Cup)
Yellow cards	67 (66 Championship, 1 FA Cup, 0 League Cup)
Red cards	6 (6 Championship, 0 FA Cup, 0 League Cup)
Worst discipline	Jacob Mellis (8 yellow, 1 red)
Best result	4–1 vs Yeovil Town (away)
Worst result	0–5 vs Huddersfield Town (away)
Most appearances	Tom Kennedy (47 Apps)
Top scorer	Chris O'Grady (15 goals)
Points	39

=== Score overview ===
As 3 May 2014

Opposition	Home score	Away score	Double
Birmingham City	0–3	1–1	No
Blackburn Rovers	2–2	2–5	No
Blackpool	2–0	0–1	No
Bolton Wanderers	0–1	0–1	No
Bournemouth	0–1	0–1	No
Brighton & Hove Albion	0–0	2–1	No
Burnley	0–1	0–1	No
Charlton Athletic	2–2	2–1	No
Derby County	1–2	1–2	No
Doncaster Rovers	0–0	2–2	No
Huddersfield Town	2–1	0–5	No
Ipswich Town	2–2	1–1	No
Leeds United	0–1	0–0	No
Leicester City	0–3	1–2	No
Middlesbrough	3–2	1–3	No
Millwall	1–0	0–1	No
Nottingham Forest	1–0	2–3	No
Queens Park Rangers	2–3	0–2	No
Reading	1–1	3–1	No
Sheffield Wednesday	1–1	0–1	No
Watford	1–5	0–3	No
Wigan Athletic	0–4	0–2	No
Yeovil Town	1–1	4–1	No
