= Jack Mackreth =

English footballer

Personal information
- Date of birth: 13 April 1992 (age 34)
- Place of birth: Liverpool, England
- Position: Winger

Youth career
- 2008–2010: Tranmere Rovers

Senior career*
Years	Team	Apps	(Gls)
2010–2011	Tranmere Rovers	0	(0)
2011	→ Chester (loan)	3	(0)
2011	→ Hyde United (loan)	5	(0)
2011–2012	Barrow	44	(5)
2012–2014	Macclesfield Town	78	(7)
2014–2016	Grimsby Town	55	(5)
2016	Tranmere Rovers	8	(0)
2016–2017	Macclesfield Town	22	(0)
2017	Bury	3	(0)
2017	→ Macclesfield Town (loan)	9	(1)
2017–2018	Wrexham	32	(0)
2018–2021	Warrington Town	57	(7)
2021	Bala Town	11	(0)
2021–2023	Warrington Town	27	(3)
- * Club domestic league appearances and goals as of 15:07, 13 December 2023 (UTC)

Jack Mackreth (born 13 April 1992) is an English footballer who plays as a winger.

He notably played as a professional for Tranmere Rovers, Macclesfield Town, Grimsby Town, Bury and Wrexham, as well as stints in Non-league with Hyde United and Barrow. He briefly played in Wales with Bala Town.

== Club career ==
=== Tranmere Rovers ===
Mackreth was associated with Tranmere Rovers from the age of 13, and signed his first professional contract in June 2010. In the two years prior, he had been a regular member of their reserve and youth teams and spent time on loan at Cammell Laird F.C. However, he was unable to break through to the first team squad and was released at the end of the 2010–2011 season, after making no league appearances despite being on the bench four times.

=== Barrow ===
Jack Mackreth signed for Barrow in August 2011, and would go on to be an integral part of the side as they finished 13th in the Football. He was almost ever-present, making 36 starts and a further 8 appearances as a substitute. Scoring 5 goals in the Conference, he was voted as Barrow's Player of the Year 2011–2012.

=== Macclesfield Town ===
Mackreth signed for Macclesfield Town in June 2012 after their relegation from League Two in the 2011–2012 season, and was Steve King's first signing as manager. He made 40 appearances and scored 3 goals as Macclesfield finished 11th in the Football Conference and historically reached the 4th round of the FA Cup.

Mackreth became one of the first players to re-sign for Macclesfield for the 2013–2014 season under new manager John Askey. Again, he was an integral part of the team as they finished 15th in the Football Conference, making 43 league appearances. He scored 4 goals in all competitions including vital winning goals against Woking to give Macclesfield their first victory of the season, and against Brackley Town in the first round of the FA Cup.

=== Grimsby Town ===
Grimsby Town were said to have been interested in signing Mackreth for a couple of years, and had made contact with him in the summer of 2013 before he chose to re-sign with Macclesfield. Mackreth signed for Grimsby in June 2014, and suggested that he regretted not signing for them sooner. In the first few weeks of the season Mackreth was predominantly a substitute, but he fought his way into the starting line-up and mostly remained there for the rest of the 2014–2015 season. In the league he made 40 appearances. Mackreth played every minute of Grimsby's unsuccessful play-off campaign, which ended in a 5–3 defeat on penalties to Bristol Rovers after a 1–1 draw in the play-off final.

He renewed his contract in May 2015, but was unable to retain his place in the starting team. Mackreth made 15 appearances for Grimsby, 10 of which were from the substitutes bench. After scoring against Woking on 14 November – his only goal of the season – he would never play for Grimsby again. It seemed likely in the following months that he would leave on loan after becoming frustrated with his lack of game time, but this did not happen. After being relegated to the reserves, Mackreth left by mutual consent on 29 January 2016.

In total he made 55 league appearances for Grimsby, scoring 5 goals.

=== Return to Tranmere Rovers ===
Jack Mackreth was then signed by Tranmere Rovers on 30 January, returning four and a half years after he was released by the club. The move was described as a "no-brainer" by manager Gary Brabin, and he made his debut against Torquay United that day as a 71st-minute substitute. However, he would again struggle for game time and made just 8 appearances (including 7 as a substitute) from a possible 16 in the league campaign.

=== Return to Macclesfield Town ===
After Tranmere chose not to extend his short-term contract, Mackreth re-signed for Macclesfield in July 2016.

=== Bury ===
Mackreth signed for League One side Bury on 1 January 2017 for an undisclosed fee. He re-joined Macclesfield on loan for the rest of the season in March 2017.

He was loaned out to Macclesfield Town on 14 March 2017 for the rest of the season. However, he was recalled on 18 April 2017.

=== Wrexham ===
On 6 June 2017, Mackreth signed for Wrexham on a one-year deal.

Mackreth was released by Wrexham in May 2018.

=== Non-league ===
Following his release from Wrexham, Mackreth signed for Northern Premier League Premier Division side Warrington Town.

On 1 February 2021, Mackreth joined Cymru Premier side Bala Town.

After his short spell at Bala Town, he returned to Warrington Town for the 2021–22 season.

== Career statistics ==
As of match played 1 January 2022

Appearances and goals by club, season and competition
Club	Season	League			FA Cup		League Cup		Other		Total	
Club	Season	Division	Apps	Goals	Apps	Goals	Apps	Goals	Apps	Goals	Apps	Goals
Tranmere Rovers	2010–11	League One	0	0	0	0	0	0	0	0	0	0
Chester (loan)	2010–11	NPL Division One North	3	0	0	0	—		0	0	3	0
Hyde United (loan)	2010–11	Conference North	5	0	0	0	—		0	0	5	0
Barrow	2011–12	Football Conference	44	5	2	0	—		2 (Note: Appearance(s) in FA Trophy)	0	48	5
Macclesfield Town	2012–13	Football Conference	35	4	5	0	—		1	0	41	4
Macclesfield Town	2013–14	Football Conference	43	3	3	1	—		1	0	47	4
Macclesfield Town	Total		78	7	8	1	—		2	0	89	8
Grimsby Town	2014–15	Football Conference	40	4	2	0	—		6 (Note: Three appearances and two goals in FA Trophy, three appearances in Conference play-offs.)	2	48	6
Grimsby Town	2015–16	National League	15	1	0	0	—		2	1	17	2
Grimsby Town	Total		55	5	2	0	—		8	3	65	8
Tranmere Rovers	2015–16	National League	8	0	—		—		0	0	8	0
Macclesfield Town	2016–17	National League	22	0	3	1	—		1	0	26	1
Bury	2016–17	League One	3	0	0	0	0	0	0	0	3	0
Macclesfield Town (loan)	2016–17	National League	9	1	0	0	—		0	0	9	1
Wrexham	2017–18	National League	32	0	1	0	—		1	0	34	0
Warrington Town	2018–19	NPL Premier Division	17	1	—		—		3 (Note: Appearance(s) in NPL Premier Division play-offs)	0	20	1
Warrington Town	2019–20	NPL Premier Division	31	6	1	0	—		1	0	33	6
Warrington Town	2020–21	NPL Premier Division	9	0	1	0	—		2	0	12	0
Warrington Town	Total		57	7	2	0	—		6	0	65	7
Bala Town	2020–21	Cymru Premier	11	0	—		—		0	0	11	0
Warrington Town	2021–22	NPL Premier Division	27	3	1	0	—		3	1	31	4
Total			354	28	19	2	0	0	23	4	397	34
