= Dale Jennings (footballer) =

English footballer

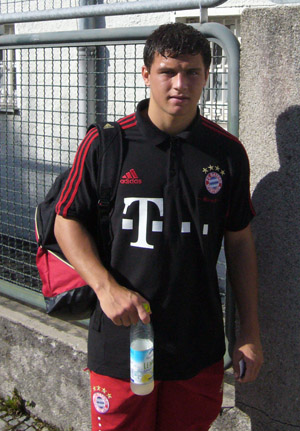
- Jennings with Bayern Munich II in 2011

Personal information
- Full name: Dale Jennings
- Date of birth: 21 December 1992 (age 33)
- Place of birth: Liverpool, England
- Height: 5 ft 9 in (1.75 m)
- Position: Winger

Team information
- Current team: 1874 Northwich

Youth career
- 2002–2008: Liverpool
- 2008–2010: Tranmere Rovers

Senior career*
Years	Team	Apps	(Gls)
2010–2011	Tranmere Rovers	29	(6)
2011–2013	Bayern Munich II	36	(1)
2013–2015	Barnsley	47	(4)
2013–2014	→ Milton Keynes Dons (loan)	6	(0)
2015–2016	Milton Keynes Dons	1	(0)
2018–2020	Runcorn Town	16	(9)
2021	Prestatyn Town	0	(0)
2021	Runcorn Town	8	(1)
2021	Ramsbottom United	2	(0)
2021–2022	Prescot Cables	9	(0)
2025	Flint Mountain	2	(0)
2025–	1874 Northwich		
- * Club domestic league appearances and goals as of 2 October 2021

Dale Jennings (born 21 December 1992) is an English footballer who plays as a forward for 1874 Northwich.

Jennings began his professional career at Tranmere Rovers in 2010. A year later, he moved to Bayern Munich, where he played in their reserve team in the Regionalliga Bayern. He returned to the Football League with Barnsley and Milton Keynes Dons, and after a two-year hiatus resumed his career at Runcorn in 2018.

== Career ==
=== Tranmere Rovers ===
Born in Liverpool, Jennings played youth football at Liverpool before being released as a schoolboy. He soon joined Tranmere Rovers in 2008, having played for other clubs and having visited Rovers for a trial. He made his club and Football League debut on 18 September 2010, in Tranmere's 1–1 draw against Charlton Athletic, coming on as a second-half substitute. On 28 September 2010, he scored his first goal for the club in a 1–0 win against Bristol Rovers in his third senior match for the club.

On 20 October 2010, Jennings signed his first professional contract, which would run until the end of the 2011–12 season. Ten days later, he scored a brace and made two assists in the 4–2 victory over Milton Keynes Dons. On 13 November, Jennings scored a winner against Plymouth Argyle with a twisting run from the halfway line. In October 2010, Jennings received the award for Apprentice of the month from the LFE.

His goal against Plymouth helped attract interest from larger clubs, and Tranmere rejected an offer for Jennings from an unnamed Premier League club in the 2011 January transfer window. In March 2011, he was voted League One Apprentice of the Year at the Football League awards and in May 2011 he was announced as Tranmere Rovers' Young Player of the Year.

=== Bayern Munich ===
In July 2011, Jennings signed for German club Bayern Munich, where he would initially play for Bayern Munich II the reserve team in the Regionalliga Süd. In late October 2011, Jennings' habituation into Germany was hindered after he suffered multiple ligament tears in his knee, sidelining him until March 2012. On 11 October 2012, Jennings scored his first goal in a Bayern shirt in a 2–0 friendly win over SpVgg Unterhaching. On 27 October 2012, he scored his first competitive goal in Germany in a 2–1 loss away at Würzburger Kickers, with his second following just six days later in a 2–2 draw at FC Augsburg II.

=== Barnsley ===
On 18 June 2013, it was confirmed Jennings had signed for Barnsley on a three-year deal for a fee of £250,000 from Bayern Munich. Upon arriving, Jennings spoke of disappointment of having not broken into the first team squad at Bayern Munich and his excitement at Barnsley and his eagerness to do well there.

On 3 August 2013, he made his Barnsley debut against Wigan Athletic, coming on as a substitute in the second half for Tom Kennedy; however, he was sent off just five minutes after he came on, having misjudged a challenge on Wigan's James McArthur. Subsequently, he was suspended for the following three games. While suspended, Jennings scored a hat-trick for the reserves and he scored his first senior goal for the club on 8 March 2014, in a 1–0 win against Nottingham Forest.

=== Milton Keynes Dons ===
On 30 June 2015, following his release by Barnsley, Jennings signed for Championship side Milton Keynes Dons on a one-year contract having previous played for the club on loan for a short period in 2013. On 1 February 2016, Jennings left the club following the mutual termination of his contract having made only two appearances since signing.

=== Return to football with Runcorn Town ===
On 28 September 2018, Jennings signed for non-league club Runcorn Town looking to "resurrect his career", with a view to returning to playing in the Football League once again. He made his debut for the club on 3 October against Congleton Town and three days later he scored his first goal for Runcorn in a 3–0 away win against Silsden.

=== Prestatyn Town ===
On 4 December 2020, Jennings signed for Welsh club Prestatyn Town in the JD Cymru North Division. He was unable to play any competitive games for the club as the season was cancelled due to Welsh government restrictions in relation to the COVID-19 pandemic.

=== Return to Runcorn Town ===
In June 2021, he returned to Runcorn Town for a second spell with the club.

=== Ramsbottom United ===
In early October 2021, he joined Ramsbottom United. He made two league appearances for the club.

=== Prescot Cables ===
On 22 October 2021, he joined Prescot Cables.

At the end of September 2025 he joined 1874 Northwich.

== Personal life ==
In August 2017, Jennings' eldest daughter was diagnosed with leukemia.

== Career statistics ==
As of matches played 2 October 2021.

Appearances and goals by club, season and competition
Club	Season	League			FA Cup		League Cup		Other		Total	
Club	Season	Division	Apps	Goals	Apps	Goals	Apps	Goals	Apps	Goals	Apps	Goals
Tranmere Rovers	2010–11	League One	29	6	1	0	0	0	2 (Note: Appearances in Football League Trophy.)	0	32	6
Bayern Munich II	2011–12	Regionalliga Süd	20	0	—						20	0
Bayern Munich II	2012–13	Regionalliga Bayern	16	1	—						16	1
Bayern Munich II	Total		36	1	—						36	1
Barnsley	2013–14	Championship	27	3	0	0	0	0	—		27	3
Barnsley	2014–15	League One	20	1	3	2	0	0	1	0	24	3
Barnsley	Total		47	4	3	2	0	0	1	0	51	6
Milton Keynes Dons (loan)	2013–14	League One	6	0	0	0	—		—		6	0
Milton Keynes Dons	2015–16	Championship	1	0	0	0	1	0	—		2	0
Milton Keynes Dons	Total		7	0	0	0	1	0	—		8	0
Runcorn Town	2018–19	NWCFL Premier	12	6	—		—		2 (Note: One appearance and goal in FA Vase and one appearance in NW Counties League Cup.)	1	14	7
Runcorn Town	2019–20	NWCFL Premier	0	0	0	0	—		0	0	0	0
Runcorn Town	2020–21	NWCFL Premier	4	3	3	0	—		3	1	10	4
Runcorn Town	Total		16	9	3	0	—		5	2	22	11
Prestatyn Town	2020–21	JD Cymru North Division							—			
Runcorn Town	2021–22	NWCFL Premier	8	1	1	0	—		3	0	12	1
Ramsbottom United	2021–22	Northern Premier League	0	0	0	0	—		0	0	0	0
Career total			143	21	8	2	1	0	11	2	161	25

== Honours ==
- Football League One Apprentice of the Year: 2010–11
- Tranmere Rovers Young Player of the Year: 2010–11
