= Joe Collister =

English footballer

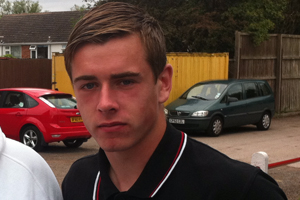
- Collister in August 2011

Personal information
- Full name: Joseph Douglas Collister
- Date of birth: 15 December 1991 (age 34)
- Place of birth: Wirral, England
- Position: Goalkeeper

Team information
- Current team: Heswall

Youth career
- ?–2009: Tranmere Rovers

Senior career*
Years	Team	Apps	(Gls)
2009–2011	Tranmere Rovers	14	(0)
2011–2012	Tamworth	4	(0)
2011	→ Barwell (loan)	3	(0)
2012	→ Altrincham (loan)	4	(0)
2012	→ Fleetwood Town (loan)	0	(0)
2012–2013	A.F.C. Telford United	0	(0)
2013	Altrincham	0	(0)
2014–	Heswall		
- * Club domestic league appearances and goals as of 20:28, 21 September 2015 (UTC)

Joseph Douglas Collister (born 15 December 1991) is an English former professional footballer who played as a goalkeeper. He played in the Football League with Tranmere Rovers before dropping into semi-professional and amateur football. He currently plays for West Cheshire League team Heswall.

== Playing career ==
=== Tranmere Rovers ===
Born in Wirral, Merseyside, Collister started his career with Tranmere Rovers when he signed a two-year professional contract with the club on 23 July 2009, where he had graduated from the Rovers' Centre of Excellence.

Collister was primarily used as understudy to on-loan West Bromwich Albion goalkeeper Luke Daniels. However, following an injury to Daniels on 12 September 2009, Collister came on as a second-half substitute, and in doing so made his Tranmere Rovers debut, in a League One fixture in which the club lost 3–2 at home to Walsall.

Collister went on to make a total of 14 appearances with Tranmere, but following the end of his two-year contract, manager Les Parry decided to release Collister at the end of the 2010–11 season.

=== Tamworth ===
Following a successful trial period, Collister signed for Conference National side Tamworth in August 2011, signing a one-year contract. He joined Barwell on a one-month loan on 24 September along with Lee Weemes and Luke Shearer.

Collister made his debut for Tamworth on 1 January 2012 in a 2–2 draw with Alfreton Town. Later that month he went on loan to Altrincham. He made his debut in a 2–0 defeat away at Gainsbrough trinity, saving a penalty and winning man of the match award.

In late March he joined Fleetwood Town on loan until the end of the season.

=== AFC Telford United ===
On 31 August 2012, Collister joined AFC Telford United on a one-year deal.

He was released to free up space for Telford to bring in more players on 5 February 2013

=== Altrincham ===
He rejoined former club Altrincham until the end of the 2012–2013 season.

=== Heswall ===
After leaving Altrincham, Collister joined West Cheshire League team Heswall.

== Personal life ==
Collister attended Hilbre High School in Newton, West Kirby, Wirral until the age of 16.
