= Nick Wood (footballer) =

English footballer

Personal information
- Full name: Nicholas Jack Wood
- Date of birth: 9 November 1990 (age 35)
- Place of birth: Ossett, England
- Position: Defender

Senior career*
Years	Team	Apps	(Gls)
2008–2010	Sheffield Wednesday	0	(0)
2009–2010	→ Sheffield (loan)	?	(0)
2010–2011	Tranmere Rovers	11	(0)
2011	Mansfield Town	0	(0)
- * Club domestic league appearances and goals as of 16:55, 19 April 2011 (UTC)

Nicholas Jack Wood (born 9 November 1990, in England) is an English retired footballer who played as a defender.

He made his Football League debut whilst at Tranmere Rovers on 7 August 2010 in the Football League One clash with Oldham Athletic which ended in a 2–1 defeat at Prenton Park.

At the end of the 2010–11 season he was not offered a new contract by the club. On 11 August 2011, Nick Wood signed a 1-month contract with Mansfield Town FC of the Blue Square Bet Premier, following a successful trial period. However, after making one substitute appearance the club announced on 14 September 2011 that he had been released.
