= 2018–19 Bury F.C. season =

Bury F.C.
2018–19 season
- Chairman: Steven Dale
- Head Coach: Ryan Lowe
- Stadium: Gigg Lane
- League Two: 2nd (promoted)
- FA Cup: Second round (vs Luton Town)
- EFL Cup: First round (vs Nottingham Forest)
- EFL Trophy: Semi-final (vs Portsmouth)
- Biggest win: 5–0 (vs. Dover Athletic, 10 Nov 2018, FA Cup R1)
- Biggest defeat: 0–3 (twice) (vs. Portsmouth, 26 Feb 2019, EFL Trophy SF) (vs. Cambridge United, 2 Apr 2019)
Home colours	Away colours

The 2018–19 season was Bury's first in EFL League Two following relegation from EFL League One in 2017–18.

== Competitions ==
=== Pre-season friendlies ===
6 July 2018 Friendly	Rangers	6–0	Bury	Ibrox, Glasgow
19:15 BST	Murphy 7'; Katić 31'; Arfield 35', 65'; Morelos 70'; Rudden 75'	Report		Stadium: Ibrox Stadium; Attendance: 41,015; Referee: Kevin Clancy

10 July 2018 Friendly	Bury	0–4	Huddersfield Town	Bury
19:45 BST		Report	Pritchard 21' van La Parra 49'; Sabiri 59'; Daly 80'	Stadium: Gigg Lane

14 July 2018 Friendly	Bury	0–0	Liverpool	Bury
15:00 BST		Report		Stadium: Gigg Lane; Attendance: 6,852

18 July 2018 Friendly	Bury	1–1	Everton	Bury
19:45 BST	Danns 43'	Report	Niasse 63'	Stadium: Gigg Lane

21 July 2018 Friendly	Chester	0–1	Bury	Chester
15:00 BST		Report	Omotayo 49'	Stadium: Deva Stadium

24 July 2018 Friendly	Radcliffe	2–2	Bury	Radcliffe
19:45 BST	Lacy 62'; Owolabi 74'	Report	Grogan 6' (o.g.); Adams 88'	Stadium: Stainton Park; Attendance: 614

=== League Two ===
==== League table ====
Pos	Team	Pld	W	D	L	GF	GA	GD	Pts	Promotion, qualification or relegation
1	Lincoln City (C, P)	46	23	16	7	73	43	+30	85	Promotion to EFL League One
2	Bury (P)	46	22	13	11	82	56	+26	79	Promotion to EFL League One
3	Milton Keynes Dons (P)	46	23	10	13	71	49	+22	79	Promotion to EFL League One
4	Mansfield Town	46	20	16	10	69	41	+28	76	Qualification for League Two play-offs (Note: Four teams play for one spot and promotion to EFL League One.)
5	Forest Green Rovers	46	20	14	12	68	47	+21	74	Qualification for League Two play-offs

Source: EFL Official Website
Rules for classification: 1) Points; 2) Goal difference; 3) Number of goals scored; 4) Head-to-head results
(C) Champions; (P) Promoted

==== Results summary ====
Overall								Home						Away					
Pld	W	D	L	GF	GA	GD	Pts	W	D	L	GF	GA	GD	W	D	L	GF	GA	GD
46	22	13	11	82	56	+26	79	14	6	3	52	26	+26	8	7	8	30	30	0

Last updated: 4 May 2019.
Source: BBC

==== Results by matchday ====
Matchday	1	2	3	4	5	6	7	8	9	10	11	12	13	14	15	16	17	18	19	20	21	22	23	24	25	26	27	28	29	30	31	32	33	34	35	36	37	38	39	40	41	42	43	44	45	46
Ground	H	A	H	A	A	H	H	A	H	A	A	H	A	H	H	A	A	H	A	H	H	A	H	A	A	H	A	H	A	H	H	A	A	H	H	A	A	A	H	H	A	H	A	H	A	H
Result	W	L	D	L	L	W	W	W	L	W	D	D	D	W	D	L	W	W	D	W	W	L	W	L	D	W	W	W	W	D	D	W	W	W	W	D	W	D	L	L	L	W	L	W	D	D
Position	8	11	14	17	19	15	13	7	11	8	9	11	9	7	8	9	9	8	9	5	4	4	4	6	5	4	3	2	2	3	3	3	2	2	2	2	2	2	2	2	4	2	4	2	2	2

Updated to match(es) played on 4 May 2019. Source: Statto.com
A = Away; H = Home; W = Win; D = Draw; L = Loss

==== Matches ====
On 21 June 2018, the League Two fixtures for the forthcoming season were announced.

4 August 2018 1	Bury	1–0	Yeovil Town	Bury
15:00 BST	Omotayo 89'	Report		Stadium: Gigg Lane; Attendance: 3,151; Referee: Dean Whitestone

11 August 2018 2	Milton Keynes Dons	1–0	Bury	Denbigh
15:00 BST	Cissé 90'	Report		Stadium: Stadium mk Attendance: 6,867; Referee: Antony Coggins

18 August 2018 3	Bury	1–1	Forest Green Rovers	Bury
15:00 BST	Aimson 90'	Report	Doidge 29'	Stadium: Gigg Lane; Attendance: 2,853; Referee: John Busby

21 August 2018 4	Lincoln City	2-1	Bury	Lincoln
19:45 BST	Akinde 75' (pen.); Frecklington 82'	Report	O'Connell 31'	Stadium: Sincil Bank; Attendance: 8,016; Referee: Seb Stockbridge

25 August 2018 5	Crawley Town	3–2	Bury	Crawley
15:00 BST	Smith 4'; Camará 81'; Palmer 88'	Report	Dagnall 56'; Mayor 78'	Stadium: Broadfield Stadium; Attendance: 2,036; Referee: Craig Hicks

1 September 2018 6	Bury	3–2	Morecambe	Bury
15:00 BST	Thompson 29'; Telford 44', 86'	Report	Oates 38'; Mandeville 90+2'	Stadium: Gigg Lane; Attendance: 3,242; Referee: Ben Toner

8 September 2018 7	Bury	4–0	Grimsby Town	Bury
15:00 BST	Mayor 14', 70'; Aimson 34'; Dagnall 63'	Report		Stadium: Gigg Lane; Attendance: 3,677; Referee: Anthony Backhouse

15 September 2018 8	Swindon Town	1–2	Bury	Swindon
15:00 BST	Woolfenden 50'	Report	Moore 19', 56'	Stadium: County Ground; Attendance: 6,087; Referee: Kevin Johnson

22 September 2018 9	Bury	0–1	Carlisle United	Bury
15:00 BST		Report	Bennett 52'; Yates (red card) 85'	Stadium: Gigg Lane; Attendance: 3,657; Referee: Mark Heywood

29 September 2018 10	Colchester United	1–2	Bury	Colchester
15:00 BST	Norris 81' (pen.)	Report	Moore 35'; Dagnall 52'	Stadium: Colchester Community Stadium; Attendance: 3,161; Referee: Thomas Bramall

2 October 2018 11	Northampton Town	0–0	Bury	Northampton
19:45 BST		Report		Stadium: Sixfields Stadium; Attendance: 4,073; Referee: Chris Sarginson

6 October 2018 12	Bury	2–2	Mansfield Town	Bury
15:00 BST	O'Shea (yellow card) 50'; Maynard 56', 90+5'	Report	Rose 10', (yellow card) 13'; Preston 73'; Sweeney (yellow card) 39'; Bishop (yellow card) 23'; Walker (yellow card) 45'	Stadium: Gigg Lane; Attendance: 3,880; Referee: Scott Oldham

13 October 2018 13	Crewe Alexandra	1–1	Bury	Crewe
19:45 BST	Kirk 37'; Ng (yellow card) 59'; Jones (yellow card) 67'; Miller (yellow card) 90'	Report	Maynard 54'; McFadzean (yellow card) 87'	Stadium: Gresty Road; Attendance: 3,777; Referee: Graham Salisbury

20 October 2018 14	Bury	4–0	Notts County	Bury
15:00 BST	Maynard 11'; Telford 18'; O'Shea 65' (pen.); Adams 88'	Report		Stadium: Gigg Lane; Attendance: 4,103; Referee: Carl Boyeson

23 October 2018 15	Bury	1–1	Newport County	Bury
19:45 BST (UTC+1)	Maynard 24'	Report	Matt 56'	Stadium: Gigg Lane; Attendance: 3,072; Referee: Martin Coy

27 October 2018 16	Port Vale	1–0	Bury	Burslem
15:00 BST	Pope 51'	Report		Stadium: Vale Park; Attendance: 4,375; Referee: Alan Young

3 November 2018 17	Macclesfield Town	1–4	Bury	Macclesfield
15:00 GMT	Stephens 30'; Smith (yellow card) 45'	Report	Danns 14', 18'; O'Shea 44'; Maynard 60'	Stadium: Moss Rose; Attendance: 2,485; Referee: Ross Joyce

17 November 2018 18	Bury	4–0	Stevenage	Bury
15:00 GMT	O'Shea 63', 78'; Mayor 68'; O'Connell 83'	Report	Guthrie (red card) 41'	Stadium: Gigg Lane; Attendance: 3,385; Referee: Tom Nield

24 November 2018 19	Cambridge United	2–2	Bury	Cambridge
15:00 GMT	Lewis 39' (red card) 55'; Taylor 86'	Report	O'Shea 23'; Aimson 26'	Stadium: Abbey Stadium; Attendance: 3,846; Referee: Christopher Sarginson

27 November 2018 20	Bury	4–1	Cheltenham Town	Bury
19:45 GMT	Stokes 14'; Maynard 39', 79'; Moore 72'	Report	Clements 25'	Stadium: Gigg Lane; Attendance: 2,779; Referee: Carl Boyeson

8 December 2018 21	Bury	2–0	Exeter City	Bury
15:00 GMT	O'Shea 39'; Moore 76'	Report		Stadium: Gigg Lane; Attendance: 3,328; Referee: Ross Joyce

15 December 2018 22	Oldham Athletic	4–2	Bury	Oldham
15:00 GMT	O'Grady 8', 31', 62', (yellow card) 64'; Surridge 10'; Iversen (yellow card) 57'; Clarke (yellow card) 19'; Hunt (yellow card) 69'	Report	Maynard (yellow card) 40'; Lavery 46', 56'; McFadzean (yellow card) 80'	Stadium: Boundary Park; Attendance: 5,018; Referee: Darren England

22 December 2018 23	Bury	2–1	Tranmere Rovers	Bury
15:00 GMT	Maynard 52'; Lavery 90+1'	Report	Sutton 90+4'	Stadium: Gigg Lane; Attendance: 4,748; Referee: Andy Haines

26 December 2018 24	Mansfield Town	2–1	Bury	Mansfield
15:00 GMT	Hamilton 61'; Elšnik (yellow card) 66'; Walker 79' (pen.); Preston (yellow card) 90+6'	Report	O'Shea (yellow card) 48' (goal) 90+6' (pen.); Thompson (yellow card) 79'; Aimson (yellow card) 90+3'; Stokes (yellow card) 90+4'	Stadium: Field Mill; Attendance: 4,959; Referee: Ollie Yates

29 December 2018 25	Notts County	0–0	Bury	Nottingham
15:00 GMT	Milsom (yellow card) 21'; Kellett (yellow card) 39'; Vaughan (yellow card) 65'; Stead (penalty missed) 74'; Bird (yellow card) 84'	Report	Thompson (yellow card) 63'	Stadium: Meadow Lane; Attendance: 7,014; Referee: Brett Huxtable

1 January 2019 26	Bury	3–1	Crewe Alexandra	Bury
15:00 GMT	O'Shea (yellow card) 39' (goal) 58' (pen.), 76'; Lavery 50'; Styles (yellow card) 62'	Report	Porter 3'; Ray (yellow card) 61'	Stadium: Gigg Lane; Attendance: 3,812; Referee: Seb Stockbridge

5 January 2019 27	Yeovil Town	0–1	Bury	Yeovil
15:00 GMT	Warren (yellow card) 12'; D'Almeida (yellow card) 78'	Report	Maynard 24'; Lavery (yellow card) 49'; McFadzean (yellow card) 71'; Murphy (yellow card) 90+1'	Stadium: Huish Park; Attendance: 2,426; Referee: Nick Kinseley

12 January 2019 28	Bury	4–3	Milton Keynes Dons	Bury
15:00 GMT	O'Shea (penalty missed) 13' 33' (pen.); Stokes (yellow card) 42'; Telford 72'; Mayor 77' (yellow card) 90+5'; Adams 90+1'	Report	Moore-Taylor 9'; Lewington (yellow card) 33' (goal) 36'; Pawlett (yellow card) 41'; Houghton (yellow card) 47'; Stokes 53' (o.g.)	Stadium: Gigg Lane; Attendance: 4,072; Referee: Peter Bankes

19 January 2019 29	Forest Green Rovers	1–2	Bury	Nailsworth
15:00 GMT	Brown 28'; James (yellow card) 45'; Winchester (yellow card) 45+2'	Report	O'Shea 69'; Maynard 83'	Stadium: The New Lawn; Attendance: 2,940; Referee: Lee Swabey

26 January 2019 30	Bury	3–3	Lincoln City	Bury
17:30 GMT	O'Shea 15'; Mayor (yellow card) 33'; Adams 42'; Murphy (yellow card) 62'; Aimson 86'	Report	Rowe 9'; Stokes 27' (o.g.); Akinde 63' (pen.)	Stadium: Gigg Lane; Attendance: 5,169; Referee: Dean Whitestone

2 February 2019 31	Bury	1–1	Crawley Town	Bury
15:00 GMT	Maynard 83'	Report	Dallison (yellow card) 43'; Palmer 87'	Stadium: Gigg Lane; Attendance: 3,625; Referee: Neil Hair

9 February 2019 32	Morecambe	2–3	Bury	Morecambe
15:00 GMT	Mills (yellow card) 58'; Bennett 65' (yellow card) 89'; Old 69'	Report	Mayor 17'; O'Shea 45+4', 59' (yellow card) 60'	Stadium: Globe Arena; Attendance: 2,665; Referee: Anthony Backhouse

16 February 2019 33	Exeter City	0–1	Bury	Exeter
15:00 GMT	Taylor (yellow card) 45'; Moxey (yellow card) 90'	Report	Wharton (yellow card) 26'; Maynard 66'; Murphy (yellow card) 89'; Adams (yellow card) 93'	Stadium: St James Park; Attendance: 4,607; Referee: Ollie Yates

23 February 2019 34	Bury	3–1	Oldham Athletic	Bury
15:00 GMT	Maynard 72', 90'; O'Shea 76'	Report	Lang 8'; Hunt (yellow card) 26'; Baxter (yellow card) 67'; Clarke (yellow card) 73'; Edmundson (yellow card) 85'	Stadium: Gigg Lane; Attendance: 7,784; Referee: Darren Drysdale

2 March 2019 35	Bury	3–0	Macclesfield Town	Bury
15:00 GMT	Maynard 24'; O'Shea 75' (pen.); Wharton 94'	Report		Stadium: Gigg Lane; Attendance: 4,277; Referee: Eddie Ilderton

5 March 2019 36	Cheltenham Town	1–1	Bury	Cheltenham
19:45 GMT	Waters 33'; Pring (yellow card) 70'; Tillson (yellow card) 73'	Report	Wharton 13'	Stadium: Whaddon Road; Attendance: 2,409; Referee: Paul Tierney

9 March 2019 37	Stevenage Town	0–1	Bury	Stevenage
15:00 GMT		Report	O'Connell (yellow card) 74'; Rossiter (yellow card) 87'; Maynard 95'	Stadium: Broadhall Way; Attendance: 3,530; Referee: John Busby

16 March 2019 P	Bury	P–P	Cambridge United	Bury
15:00 GMT		Report		Stadium: Gigg Lane
Note: Fixture was postponed due to a waterlogged pitch. Rescheduled for Tuesday, 2 April at 19:45.

23 March 2019 38	Grimsby Town	0–0	Bury	Grimsby
15:00 GMT	Wharton (yellow card) 84'	Report	Hendrie (yellow card) 65'; Davis (yellow card) 72'	Stadium: Blundell Park; Attendance: 4,375; Referee: Anthony Backhouse

30 March 2019 39	Bury	1–3	Swindon Town	Bury
15:00 GMT	Maynard 28'; Mayor (red card) 74'	Report	Robinson (yellow card) 21' (goal) 88'; Woolery 25', 57'; Bennett (yellow card) 41'; Carroll (yellow card) 74'	Stadium: Gigg Lane; Attendance: 3,997; Referee: Scott Oldham

2 April 2019 40	Bury	0–3	Cambridge United	Bury
19:45 BST		Report	Jones 16'; Amoo 34'; Maris 72'	Stadium: Gigg Lane; Attendance: 3,386; Referee: Antony Coggins

6 April 2019 41	Carlisle United	3–2	Bury	Carlisle
15:00 BST	Devitt 1'; Jones (yellow card) 30' (yellow-red card) 45+2'; O'Hare 50'; Hope 89'	Report	Stokes 8', 43'; O'Connell (yellow card) 53'; McFadzean (yellow card) 85'	Stadium: Brunton Park; Attendance: 4,656; Referee: Christopher Sarginson

13 April 2019 42	Bury	2–0	Colchester United	Bury
15:00 BST	Telford 49', 66'; Danns (yellow card) 68'; Rossiter (yellow card) 87'	Report		Stadium: Gigg Lane; Attendance: 3,898; Referee: Andy Haines

19 April 2019 43	Newport County	3–1	Bury	Newport
15:00 BST	Demetriou 5', 75' (yellow card) 45'; Matt 13'; Butler (yellow card) 36'; Dolan (yellow card) 51'	Report	Maynard 7'; Stokes (yellow card) 68'; Mayor (yellow card) 77'	Stadium: Rodney Parade; Attendance: 4,433; Referee: Peter Wright

22 April 2019 44	Bury	3–1	Northampton Town	Bury
15:00 BST	Stokes 39'; Mayor 65' (yellow card) 66'; Maynard 90+5'	Report	Williams 27'; Goode (yellow card) 47'; Turnbull (yellow card) 83'	Stadium: Gigg Lane; Attendance: 4,407; Referee: Michael Salisbury

27 April 2019 P	Tranmere Rovers	P–P	Bury	Birkenhead
15:00 BST		Report		Stadium: Prenton Park; Referee: David Webb
Note: Fixture was postponed due to a waterlogged pitch.

30 April 2019 45	Tranmere Rovers	1–1	Bury	Birkenhead
19:45 BST	Norwood 11'; Jennings (yellow card) 68'; Banks (yellow card) 83'	Report	Stokes (yellow card) 54'; Mayor 56' (yellow card) 57'	Stadium: Prenton Park; Attendance: 9,145; Referee: David Webb

4 May 2019 46	Bury	1–1	Port Vale	Bury
12:30 BST	Rossiter 45'	Report	Pope 24'	Stadium: Gigg Lane; Attendance: 6,719; Referee: Eddie Ilderton

=== FA Cup ===
The first round draw was made live on BBC by Dennis Wise and Dion Dublin on 22 October. The draw for the second round was made live on BBC and BT by Mark Schwarzer and Glenn Murray on 12 November.

10 November 2018 First round	Bury	5–0	Dover Athletic	Bury
15:00 BST	O'Shea 12'; Mayor 18'; Moore 36', 64'; Telford 90+1'	Report	Debayo (yellow card) 9'; Gomis (yellow card) 50'	Stadium: Gigg Lane; Attendance: 2,355; Referee: Richard Hulme

2 December 2018 Second round	Bury	0–1	Luton Town	Bury
14:00 GMT		Report	Cornick 42'	Stadium: Gigg Lane; Attendance: 2,977; Referee: Thomas Bramall

=== EFL Cup ===
On 15 June 2018, the draw for the first round was made in Vietnam.

13 August 2018 First round	Nottingham Forest	1–1 (10–9 p)	Bury	West Bridgford
19:00 BST	Smith (red card) 33'; Cash 90+3'	Report	O'Connell 2'	Stadium: City Ground; Attendance: 8,172; Referee: Scott Duncan
	Penalties
	Lolley (penalty scored); Osborn (penalty scored); Dawson (penalty scored); Murphy (penalty scored); Watson (penalty scored); Cash (penalty missed); Hefele (penalty scored); Robinson (penalty scored); Byram (penalty scored); Steele (penalty scored); Lolley (penalty scored)		O'Connell (penalty scored); O'Shea (penalty scored); Bunn (penalty scored); Omotayo (penalty scored); Stokes (penalty scored); Miller (penalty missed); Moore (penalty scored); Thompson (penalty scored); Dawson (penalty scored); Murphy (penalty scored); O'Connell (penalty missed)

=== EFL Trophy ===
On 13 July 2018, the initial group stage draw, bar the invited U-21 teams, was announced. The draw for the second round was made live on Talksport by Leon Britton and Steve Claridge on 16 November. On 8 December, the third round draw was made by Alan McInally and Matt Le Tissier on Soccer Saturday. The quarter-final draw was made on Sky Sports by Don Goodman and Thomas Frank on 10 January 2019. The draw for the semi-finals took place on 25 January live on Talksport.

Pos	Lge	Team	Pld	W	PW	PL	L	GF	GA	GD	Pts	Qualification
1	L1	Rochdale	3	2	0	1	0	6	3	+3	7	Round 2
2	L2	Bury	3	2	0	0	1	6	4	+2	6	Round 2
3	ACA	Leicester City U21	3	0	2	0	1	5	6	−1	4	
4	L1	Fleetwood Town	3	0	0	1	2	3	7	−4	1	

Source: EFL.com

4 September 2018 Group stages	Rochdale	2–1	Bury	Rochdale
19:45 BST	Clough 17'; Gillam 20'	Report	Lavery 72' (pen.)	Stadium: Spotland Stadium; Attendance: 1,582; Referee: Carl Boyeson

16 October 2018 Group stages	Bury	2–1	Leicester City U21	Bury
19:45 BST	Telford 4', 68'; McFadzean (red card) 15'	Report	Shade 21'	Stadium: Gigg Lane; Attendance: 454

13 November 2018 Group stages	Bury	3–1	Fleetwood Town	Bury
19:45 GMT	Telford 22' (pen.); Dagnall 32'; Adams 37'	Report	Dempsey 14'	Stadium: Gigg Lane; Attendance: 554

4 December 2018 Second round	Mansfield Town	0–1	Bury	Mansfield
19:45 GMT		Report	Telford 35'; Dawson (red card) 85'	Stadium: Field Mill; Attendance: 1,029

8 January 2019 Third round	Accrington Stanley	2–4	Bury	Accrington
19:45 GMT	Clark 10'; Kee 38'; Zanzala (yellow card) 42'	Report	Telford 55', 74'; Maynard 57'; Thompson (yellow card) 76'; Mayor 84'	Stadium: Crown Ground; Attendance: 1,136; Referee: Matt Donohue

22 January 2019 Quarter-final	Bury	5–2	Oxford United	Bury
19:45 GMT	Telford 16'; Thompson 26'; Moore 41'; Mayor 55'	Report	Henry 24' (pen.); Graham (yellow card) 37'; Carruthers 51'; Hanson (yellow card) 86'	Stadium: Gigg Lane; Attendance: 1,238

26 February 2019 Semi-final	Bury	0–3	Portsmouth	Bury
19:45 GMT		Report	Evans 61' (yellow card) 62'; Hawkins 64'; Curtis 77'	Stadium: Gigg Lane; Attendance: 3,900; Referee: Ross Joyce

== Transfers ==
=== Transfers in ===
Date from	Position	Nationality	Name	From	Fee	Ref.
1 July 2018	RM	(Wales)	Nicky Adams	Carlisle United	Free transfer	
1 July 2018	CB	(England)	Will Aimson	Blackpool	Free transfer	
1 July 2018	CF	(England)	Chris Dagnall	Crewe Alexandra	Free transfer	
1 July 2018	RW	(England)	Byron Moore	Bristol Rovers	Free transfer	
6 July 2018	RB	(England)	Tom Miller	Carlisle United	Free transfer	
12 July 2018	CF	(England)	Jordan Archer	Chester	Free Transfer	
13 July 2018	CF	(Nigeria)	Gold Omotayo	Whitehawk	Free transfer	
16 July 2018	LB	(England)	Chris Stokes	Coventry City	Free transfer	
24 July 2018	CF	(England)	Dom Telford	Stoke City	Free transfer	
2 August 2018	LM	(Scotland)	Callum McFadzean	Guiseley	Free transfer	
29 September 2018	CF	(England)	Nicky Maynard	(Scotland) Aberdeen	Free transfer	

=== Transfers out ===
Date from	Position	Nationality	Name	To	Fee	Ref.
1 July 2018	CB	(England)	Nathan Cameron	Macclesfield Town	Released	
1 July 2018	RM	(Jamaica)	Chris Humphrey	(Scotland) East Kilbride	Released	
1 July 2018	RM	(England)	Zeli Ismail	Walsall	Released	
1 July 2018	RB	(Wales)	Craig Jones	(Wales) Connah's Quay Nomads	Released	
1 July 2018	LB	(England)	Greg Leigh	(Netherlands) NAC Breda	Free transfer	
1 July 2018	RW	(Scotland)	Chris Maguire	Sunderland	Free transfer	
1 July 2018	CM	(England)	Andrew Tutte	Morecambe	Released	
3 July 2018	CF	(England)	Robert Harker	Burnley	Free transfer	
3 July 2018	CM	(Republic of Ireland)	Callum Reilly	Gillingham	Undisclosed	
6 August 2018	AM	(England)	Callum Styles	Barnsley	Undisclosed	
9 August 2018	DM	(Hong Kong)	Dai Wai-tsun	Oxford United	Undisclosed	
31 January 2019	CF	(England)	Chris Dagnall	Tranmere Rovers	Mutual consent	
31 January 2019	CF	(England)	Chris Sang	Free agent	Mutual consent	

=== Loans in ===
Date from	Position	Nationality	Name	From	Fee	Ref.
6 July 2018	GK	(England)	Mathew Hudson	Preston North End	2 January 2019	
6 August 2018	AM	(England)	Callum Styles	Barnsley	January 2019	
15 August 2018	CM	(Scotland)	Jamie Barjonas	(Scotland) Rangers	2 January 2019	
31 August 2018	CF	(Northern Ireland)	Caolan Lavery	Sheffield United	31 May 2019	
23 January 2019	CB	(England)	Scott Wharton	Blackburn Rovers	31 May 2019	
31 January 2019	CM	(England)	Jordan Rossiter	(Scotland) Rangers	31 May 2019	

=== Loans out ===
Date from	Position	Nationality	Name	To	Date until	Ref.
9 August 2018	CB	(Scotland)	Tom Aldred	(Scotland) Motherwell	31 May 2019	
22 August 2018	CM	(England)	Scott Burgess	(Wales) Wrexham	22 November 2018	
24 August 2018	LB	(England)	Joe Skarz	FC Halifax Town	31 May 2019	
28 August 2018	LW	(England)	Harry Bunn	Southend United	31 May 2019	
31 August 2018	CF	(England)	Jordan Archer	Maidenhead United	January 2019	
7 September 2018	GK	(England)	Scott Moloney	Skelmersdale United	6 October 2018	
5 October 2018	CF	(Switzerland)	Gold Omotayo	Maidstone United	November 2018	
5 October 2018	CF	(England)	Chris Sang	Marine	November 2018	
2 November 2018	DF	(England)	Dougie Nyaupembe	Hyde United	December 2018	
9 November 2018	CF	(England)	Jordan Archer	Southport	31 May 2019	
21 December 2018	CF	(England)	Chris Sang	Altrincham	January 2019	
11 January 2019	DF	(England)	Dougie Nyaupembe	Stalybridge Celtic	31 May 2019	
24 January 2019	CM	(England)	Scott Burgess	York City	31 May 2019	
