= Anthony Dudley (footballer) =

English footballer

Personal information
- Full name: Anthony Ryan Chippy Dudley
- Date of birth: 15 September 1996 (age 30)
- Place of birth: Manchester, England
- Height: 1.78 m (5 ft 10 in)
- Position: Forward

Team information
- Current team: Bury

Youth career
- 2013–2014: Bury

Senior career*
Years	Team	Apps	(Gls)
2014–2017	Bury	9	(0)
2015	→ Guiseley (loan)	7	(5)
2016	→ Guiseley (loan)	9	(2)
2017	→ Macclesfield Town (loan)	12	(4)
2017–2019	Salford City	37	(12)
2018–2019	→ Chester (loan)	38	(11)
2019–2023	Chester	103	(21)
2023–2026	Radcliffe	112	(13)
2026–	Bury	0	(0)
- * Club domestic league appearances and goals as of 19:36, 13 May 2026 (UTC)

Anthony Ryan Dudley (born 15 September 1996) is an English footballer who plays as a forward for Northern Premier League Premier Division club Bury.

== Club career ==
=== Bury ===
Dudley made his Football League debut for Bury in EFL League Two on 18 January 2014, coming on as a substitute for Tom Soares in the 87th minute against Burton Albion at Gigg Lane.

=== Guiseley ===
After back-to-back loan spells with National League team Guiseley, with whom he made 16 appearances and scored 7 goals.

=== Macclesfield Town ===
Dudley signed for another National League side on loan Macclesfield Town, in January 2017. He joined Macclesfield as part of the transfer of Jack Mackreth to Bury.

=== Salford City ===
In June 2017 he joined Salford City on a two-year contract, valid from the expiry of his contract at Bury at the end of the month.

In June 2019 he was released by Salford.

=== Chester ===
On 26 July 2018 he joined Chester on a season-long loan along with fellow player Danny Livesey, reuniting them with their former Salford managers. At the end of the season, Chester confirmed both players had returned to their parent club.

In June 2019, Dudley signed for National League North club Chester on a permanent one-year deal.

=== Radcliffe ===
In May 2023, Dudley signed for Northern Premier League Premier Division club Radcliffe. In his first season since joining, the club earned promotion to the National League North as Premier Division champions.

=== Return to Bury ===
On 13 May 2026, Dudley returned to first club Bury, following their promotion to the Northern Premier League Premier Division.

== Career statistics ==
As of end of 2025–26 season

Appearances and goals by club, season and competition
Club	Season	League			FA Cup		League Cup		Other		Total	
Club	Season	Division	Apps	Goals	Apps	Goals	Apps	Goals	Apps	Goals	Apps	Goals
Bury	2013–14	League Two	2	0	0	0	0	0	0	0	2	0
Bury	2014–15	League Two	1	0	0	0	0	0	0	0	1	0
Bury	2015–16	League One	3	0	0	0	0	0	0	0	3	0
Bury	2016–17	League One	3	0	0	0	0	0	3 (Note: Appearance(s) in EFL Trophy)	0	6	0
Bury	Total		9	0	0	0	0	0	3	0	12	0
Guiseley (loan)	2015–16	National League	16	7	0	0	—		2 (Note: Appearance(s) in FA Trophy)	1	18	8
Macclesfield Town (loan)	2016–17	National League	12	4	0	0	—		5	1	17	5
Salford City	2017–18	National League North	37	12	1	0	—		1	0	39	12
Chester (loan)	2018–19	National League North	38	11	1	0	—		4 (Note: Two appearances in FA Trophy, one appearance in Cheshire Senior Cup)	0	43	11
Chester	2019–20	National League North	32	5	1	0	—		5 (Note: Four appearances and one goal in FA Trophy, one appearance in National League North play-offs)	1	38	6
Chester	2020–21	National League North	17	5	3	0	—		2	2	22	7
Chester	2021–22	National League North	22	4	4	0	—		2 (Note: One appearance in FA Trophy, one appearance in Cheshire Senior Cup)	0	28	4
Chester	2022–23	National League North	32	7	4	0	—		3 (Note: Two appearances in FA Trophy, one appearance in National League North play-offs)	0	39	7
Chester	Total		141	32	13	0	—		16	3	170	35
Radcliffe	2023–24	NPL Premier Division	38	9	1	1	—		7 (Note: Five appearances and two goals in FA Trophy, one appearance and two goals in Manchester Premier Cup, one appearance in Lancashire FA Challenge Trophy)	4	46	14
Radcliffe	2024–25	National League North	44	3	2	1	—		5 (Note: Three appearances in FA Trophy, one appearance in Manchester Premier Cup, one appearance and one goal in Lancashire FA Challenge Trophy)	1	51	5
Radcliffe	2025–26	National League North	30	1	2	0	—		1	0	33	1
Radcliffe	Total		112	13	5	2	—		13	5	130	20
Career total			327	68	19	2	0	0	40	10	386	80

== Honours ==
Macclesfield Town

- FA Trophy runner-up: 2016–17

Salford City

- National League North Champions: 2017–18

Radcliffe

- Northern Premier League Premier Division Champions: 2023–24
