= 2015–16 Bury F.C. season =

Bury
2015–16 season
- Chairman: Stewart Day
- Manager: David Flitcroft
- Stadium: Gigg Lane
- League One: 16th
- FA Cup: Fourth round (vs. Hull City)
- League Cup: Second round (vs. Leicester City)
- JP Trophy: Second round (vs. Morecambe)
- Top goalscorer: League: Leon Clarke (15 goals); All: Leon Clarke (17 goals)
- Highest home attendance: 7,064 vs. Hull City, 30 January 2016
- Lowest home attendance: 1,508 vs. Morecambe, 6 October 2015
- Average home league attendance: 3,751
Home colours	Away colours	Third colours

The 2015–16 season was Bury's first season back in League One since relegation at the end of the 2012–13 season, and after having gained promotion the previous season.

== Transfers ==
=== Transfers in ===
Date from	Position	Nationality	Name	From	Fee	Ref.
1 July 2015	CF	ENG	Leon Clarke	Wolverhampton Wanderers	Free transfer	
1 July 2015	CB	ENG	Peter Clarke	Blackpool	Free transfer	
1 July 2015	CM	ENG	Jacob Mellis	Blackpool	Free transfer	
1 July 2015	CF	ENG	Tom Pope	Port Vale	Free transfer	
13 July 2015	LM	ENG	Danny Pugh	Coventry City	Free transfer	
7 August 2015	CB	ENG	Reece Brown		Free transfer	
20 October 2015	FW	ENG	Chris Eagles		Free transfer	
6 November 2015	GK	IRL	Paddy Kenny		Free transfer	

=== Transfers out ===
Date from	Position	Nationality	Name	To	Fee	Ref.
1 July 2015	RM	WAL	Nicky Adams	Northampton Town	Free transfer	
1 July 2015	CB	SCO	Jimmy McNulty	Rochdale (Note: Following McNulty's release he joined Rochdale.)	Free transfer	
1 July 2015	CB	ENG	Pablo Mills		Released	
1 July 2015	RW	ENG	Chris Sedgwick	Retired	—N/a	
1 July 2015	RM	ENG	Joe Thompson	Carlisle United (Note: Following Thompson's release he joined Carlisle United.)	Released	
19 November 2015	GK	IRL	Paddy Kenny		Released	
2 January 2016	DF	ENG	Matty Foulds	Everton	Undisclosed	

=== Loans in ===
Date from	Position	Nationality	Name	From	Date until	Ref.
21 July 2015	GK	ENG	Christian Walton	Brighton & Hove Albion	1 September 2015 (Note: Walton returned to Brighton on 1 September 2015, due to injury.)	
9 October 2015	FW	SCO	Lee Erwin	Leeds United	6 November 2015	
25 October 2015	GK	IRL	Aaron McCarey	Wolverhampton Wanderers	28 October 2015	
28 October 2015	GK	AUT	Daniel Bachmann	Stoke City	9 January 2016	
19 November 2015	FW	ENG	Joe Dodoo	Leicester City	18 December 2015	
7 January 2016	GK	IRL	Ian Lawlor	Manchester City	End of season	
15 January 2016	MF	IRL	John O'Sullivan	Blackburn Rovers	End of season	
5 March 2016	MF	ENG	Sean Clare	Sheffield Wednesday	End of season	
8 March 2016	MF	ENG	Dan Gardner	Chesterfield	End of season	
18 March 2016	FW	ENG	Nathan Delfouneso	Blackburn Rovers	19 April 2016	
18 March 2016	DF	IRL	Cian Bolger	Southend United	End of season	
18 March 2016	GK	ENG	Chris Neal	Port Vale	End of season	

=== Loans out ===
Date from	Position	Nationality	Name	To	Date until	Ref.
10 September 2015	MF	ENG	Scott Burgess	Stalybridge Celtic	8 October 2015	
22 October 2015	FW	BRB	Hallam Hope	Carlisle United	22 January 2016	
23 November 2015	FW	ENG	Ryan Lowe	Crewe Alexandra	5 January 2016	
27 January 2016	FW	WAL	Daniel Nardiello	Plymouth Argyle	End of the season	

== Competitions ==
=== Pre–season friendlies ===
On 16 June 2015, Bury announced their confirmed pre–season fixtures.

22 July 2015 Friendly	Macclesfield Town	0–1	Bury	Macclesfield
19:30 BST		Report	Clarke 39'	Stadium: Moss Rose; Attendance: 415; Referee: Oliver Yates

24 July 2015 Friendly	Morecambe	1–1	Bury	Morecambe
19:30 BST	Murphy 36'	Report	3' (o.g.)	Stadium: Globe Arena; Referee: Darren England

25 July 2015 Friendly	Radcliffe Borough	2–2	Bury	Radcliffe
15:00 BST	16'; Smith 62' (pen.)	Report	Williams 45'; Dudley 50'	Stadium: Stainton Park; Attendance: 471

28 July 2015 Friendly	Bury	1–1	Blackburn Rovers	Bury
19:45 BST	Pope 25'	Report	Conway 64'	Stadium: JD Stadium; Attendance: 1,696 (522 visitors); Referee: Darren Handley

1 August 2015 Friendly	Bury	3–2	Preston North End	Bury
15:00 BST	Clarke 11', 66'; Tutte 78' (pen.)	Report	Garner 13'; Keane 30'	Stadium: JD Stadium; Attendance: 1,307 (366 visitors); Referee: Darren Handley

=== League One ===
==== League table ====
Pos	Team	Pld	W	D	L	GF	GA	GD	Pts
14	Southend United	46	16	11	19	58	64	−6	59
15	Swindon Town	46	16	11	19	64	71	−7	59
16	Bury	46	16	12	18	56	73	−17	57 (Note: Bury were deducted 3 points for playing the unregistered Callum Styles against Southend United on 8 May.)
17	Oldham Athletic	46	12	18	16	44	58	−14	54
18	Chesterfield	46	15	8	23	58	70	−12	53

Updated to match(es) played on 1 July 2016. Source: BBC Sport
Rules for classification: 1) Points; 2) Goal difference; 3) Number of goals scored

==== Matches ====
On 17 June 2015, the fixtures for the forthcoming season were announced.

8 August 2015 1	Doncaster Rovers	1–1	Bury	Doncaster
15:00 BST	Forrester 90'	Report	L. Clarke 90'	Stadium: Keepmoat Stadium; Attendance: 6,429; Referee: Eddie Ilderton

15 August 2015 2	Bury	2–2	Swindon Town	Bury
15:00 BST	Pope 4'; Mayor 52'	Report	Robert 74'; Rodgers 83'	Stadium: Gigg Lane; Attendance: 3,947; Referee: Carl Boyeson

18 August 2015 3	Bury	3–4	Fleetwood Town	Bury
19:45 BST	L. Clarke 4'; Soares 19'; Rose 84'	Report	McLaughlin 17'; Hornby–Forbes 29'; Proctor 69'; Sarcevic 82' (pen.)	Stadium: Gigg Lane; Attendance: 2,992; Referee: James Adcock

22 August 2015 4	Crewe Alexandra	3–3	Bury	Crewe
15:00 BST	King 3'; Colclough 37'; Inman 80'	Report	Mayor 23'; Soares 45'; Rose 58'	Stadium: Gresty Road; Attendance: 4,125; Referee: Oliver Langford

29 August 2015 5	Bury	1–1	Oldham Athletic	Bury
15:00 BST	Pope 65'	Report	Croft 24'	Stadium: Gigg Lane; Attendance: 5,448; Referee: Roger East

5 September 2015 6	Walsall	0–1	Bury	Bescot
15:00 BST		Report	Jones 6'	Stadium: Bescot Stadium; Attendance: 4,829; Referee: Fred Graham

12 September 2015 7	Sheffield United	1–3	Bury	Sheffield
15:00 BST	Sharp 72' (pen.)	Report	Pope 61'; Riley 83'; L. Clarke 90'	Stadium: Bramall Lane; Attendance: 20,708; Referee: David Webb

19 September 2015 8	Bury	1–0	Port Vale	Bury
15:00 BST	Cameron 78'	Report		Stadium: Gigg Lane; Attendance: 4,323; Referee: Darren Drysdale

26 September 2015 9	Bury	2–1	Coventry City	Bury
15:00 BST	L. Clarke 19', 51' (pen.)	Report	Johnson 62'	Stadium: Gigg Lane; Attendance: 4,526; Referee: Nigel Miller

29 September 2015 10	Peterborough United	2–3	Bury	Peterborough
19:45 BST	Zakuani 43', 49'; Oztumer (red card) 25'	Report	L. Clarke 28'; Cameron 64'; Pope 81'	Stadium: London Road Stadium; Attendance: 4,208; Referee: Steve Martin

3 October 2015 11	Colchester United	0–1	Bury	Colchester
15:00 BST		Report	L. Clarke 75'	Stadium: Colchester Community Stadium; Attendance: 4,032; Referee: Simon Hooper

10 October 2015 12	Bury	2–2	Wigan Athletic	Bury
15:00 BST	Cameron 6'; Hussey (yellow card) 43' (yellow-red card); Pope 60'	Report	Cameron 85' (o.g.); Morgan 90'	Stadium: Gigg Lane; Attendance: 5,931; Referee: Graham Salisbury

17 October 2015 13	Bury	0–0	Rochdale	Bury
15:00 BST		Report		Stadium: Gigg Lane; Attendance: 6,470; Referee: Andy Woolmer

20 October 2015 14	Bradford City	2–1	Bury	Bradford
19:45 BST	McArdle 45+2'; Brown 51' (o.g.)	Report	Rose 90+4'	Stadium: Valley Parade; Attendance: 17,575; Referee: Darren Bond

24 October 2015 15	Shrewsbury Town	2–0	Bury	Shrewsbury
15:00 BST	Kaikai 28'; Ogogo 73'	Report		Stadium: New Meadow; Attendance: 4,945; Referee: Gavin Ward

31 October 2015 16	Bury	4–3	Blackpool	Bury
15:00 GMT	Rose 2', 10'; Hussey 27'; Soares 34'	Report	Cullen 12'; Robertson 44'; Redshaw 84' (pen.)	Stadium: Gigg Lane; Attendance: 5,013; Referee: Geoff Eltringham

14 November 2015 17	Gillingham	3–1	Bury	Gillingham
15:00 GMT	Samuel 6'; Egan 10'; Osadebe 87'	Report	L. Clarke 4'	Stadium: Priestfield Stadium; Attendance: 6,063; Referee: Keith Stroud

21 November 2015 18	Bury	1–0	Burton	Bury
15:00 GMT	Dodoo 40'	Report		Stadium: Gigg Lane; Attendance: 3,788; Referee: Andy Haines

24 November 2015 19	Bury	1–2	Scunthorpe United	Bury
15:00 GMT	L. Clarke 50'	Report	Madden 12' (pen.); Williams 86'	Stadium: Gigg Lane; Attendance: 2,483; Referee: Tony Harrington

28 November 2015 20	Millwall	1–0	Bury	Bermondsey
15:00 BST	Williams 13'	Report		Stadium: New Den; Attendance: 8,311; Referee: Dean Whitestone

12 December 2015 21	Bury	1–0	Chesterfield	Bury
15:00 BST	Mayor 68'	Report		Stadium: Gigg Lane; Attendance: 2,962; Referee: Peter Bankes

18 December 2015 22	Southend United	4–1	Bury	Southend-on-Sea
19:45 GMT	Hunt 22', 31'; Mooney 74' (pen.); Payne 78'	Report	L. Clarke 43'	Stadium: Roots Hall; Attendance: 6,127; Referee: James Linington

28 December 2015 24	Port Vale	1–0	Bury	Stoke-on-Trent
15:00 BST	Kelly 57'	Report	Brown (yellow card) 74'; Jones (yellow card) 90+4'	Stadium: Vale Park; Attendance: 5,467; Referee: (England) James Adcock

2 January 2016 25	Fleetwood Town	2–0	Bury	Fleetwood
15:00 BST	Hunter 49'; Grant 76'	Report	Cameron (yellow card) 26'	Stadium: Highbury Stadium; Attendance: 3,301; Referee: (England) Nigel Miller

16 January 2016 26	Bury	2–3	Walsall	Bury
15:00 BST	Rose (yellow card) 57'; Clarke 65' 66'; Lawlor (yellow card) 70'	Report	Hussey 16' (o.g.); Bradshaw 30'; Forde 42'	Stadium: Gigg Lane; Attendance: 3,532; Referee: (England) Mark Haywood

23 January 2016 27	Oldham Athletic	0–1	Bury	Oldham
15:00 BST		Report	Clarke 10'; Soares (yellow card) 49'; Jones (yellow card) 78'	Stadium: Boundary Park; Attendance: 5,537; Referee: (England) Phil Gibbs

26 January 2016 28	Bury	0–0	Crewe Alexandra	Bury
19:45 BST	O'Sullivan (yellow card) 65'; Etuhu (yellow card) 88'	Report	Guthrie (yellow card) 63'	Stadium: Gigg Lane; Attendance: 2,343; Referee: Darren England

7 February 2016 29	Barnsley	3–0	Bury	Barnsley
15:00 BST	Watkins 20'; Brownhill (yellow card) 39'; Winnall 55'; Hammill 66'	Report	Mayor (yellow card) 48'; Clarke (yellow card) 86'	Stadium: Oakwell; Attendance: 9,443; Referee: (England) Andy Haines

13 February 2016 30	Coventry City	6–0	Bury	Coventry
15:00 BST	Stokes 4'; Cargill 12'; Maddison 16'; Fleck 43'; Armstrong 68' 70'	Report	Soares (yellow card) 28'; Brown (yellow card) 41'; Lowe (yellow card) 58'; Tutte (yellow card) 82'	Stadium: Ricoh Arena; Attendance: 11,024; Referee: (England) andy Davies

16 February 2016 31	Bury	1–0	Sheffield United	Bury
19:45 BST	Jones 27'	Report	Edgar (yellow card) 79'	Stadium: Gigg Lane; Attendance: 3,081; Referee: (England) Stuart Attwell

20 February 2016 32	Bury	5–2	Colchester United	Bury
15:00 BST	Lowe 34'; Tutte 51' 51' 62'; Jones 56'	Report	Porter 4'; Eastman (yellow card) 14' (yellow-red card); Massey 17'; Brindley (yellow card) 61'	Stadium: Gigg Lane; Attendance: 3,428; Referee: (England) Mark Brown

23 February 2016 23	Bury	0–0	Barnsley	Bury
19:45 BST	Soares (yellow card) 26'; Tutte (yellow card) 43'; Rose (yellow card) 70'; Riley (yellow card) 75'; Pope (yellow card) 82'	Report	Scowen (yellow card) 25'; Roberts (yellow card) 32'; Hammill (red card) 82'	Stadium: Gigg Lane; Attendance: 3,160; Referee: (England) Carl Boyeson

27 February 2016 33	Wigan Athletic	3–0	Bury	Wigan
15:00 BST	Grigg 7' 21' (pen.); Colclough 9'; Davies (yellow card) 90'	Report	Lowe (yellow card) 37'; Jones (yellow card) 90'; Mayor (yellow card) 90'; Tutte (yellow card) 90'	Stadium: DW Stadium; Attendance: 9,490; Referee: (England) Scott Duncan (referee)

1 March 2016 34	Bury	3–1	Peterborough United	Bury
19:45 BST	Clarke 29'; Lowe 33'; Tutte 80'	Report	Santos (yellow card) 35' (yellow-red card); Smith (yellow card) 47'; Maddison 52'; Baldwin (yellow card) 74'; Bostwick (yellow card) 90'	Stadium: Gigg Lane; Attendance: 2,180; Referee: (England) Christopher Sarginson

5 March 2016 35	Bury	0–0	Bradford City	Bury
15:00 BST	Brown (yellow card) 24'	Report	McMahon (yellow card) 37'; Cullen (yellow card) 60'	Stadium: Gigg Lane; Attendance: 4,036; Referee: (England) David Webb

12 March 2016 36	Rochdale	3–0	Bury	Rochdale
15:00 BST	Mendez–Laing 11' 17'; Eastham 53'	Report	Gardner (yellow card) 26'	Stadium: Spotland Stadium; Attendance: 4,538; Referee: (England) Tony Harrington

19 March 2016 37	Bury	2–2	Shrewsbury Town	Bury
15:00 BST	Soares 30'; O'Sullivan (yellow card) 52'; Clarke 65'; Bolger (yellow card) 86'	Report	Kaikai 16' 33'; Smith (yellow card) 75'; Knight–Percival (yellow card) 83'	Stadium: Gigg Lane; Attendance: 3,248; Referee: (England) Mark Haywood

25 March 2016 38	Blackpool	1–1	Bury	Blackpool
15:00 BST	Philliskirk 74' (pen.)	Report	Mayor 76'	Stadium: Bloomfield Road; Attendance: 7,645; Referee: (England) Simon Hooper

28 March 2016 39	Bury	0–1	Gillingham	Bury
15:00 BST	Clarke (yellow card) 81'	Report	Norris 27' (yellow card) 57'; Oshilaja (yellow card) 79'; Wright (yellow card) 90+4'; El–Abd (yellow card) 90+9'	Stadium: Gigg Lane; Attendance: 2,907; Referee: (England) Oliver Langford

2 April 2016 40	Burton Albion	1–1	Bury	Burton-on-Trent
	Walker 90'	Report	Lowe 74'	Stadium: Pirelli Stadium; Attendance: 3,331

April 9, 2016 41	Bury	1–0	Doncaster Rovers	Bury
15:00 GMT	Clarke 77' (yellow card) 78'	Report	Lund (yellow card) 45'	Stadium: Gigg Lane; Attendance: 3,233; Referee: Michael Bull

16 April 2016 42	Swindon Town	0–1	Bury	Swindon
15:00 BST		Report	Mayor 63'	Stadium: County Ground; Attendance: 6,759; Referee: Darren Deadman

19 April 2016 43	Scunthorpe United	2–1	Bury	Scunthorpe
19:45 GMT	Williams 19'; Madden (yellow card) 31'; Wootton 53'; Bishop (yellow card) 89'	Report	Jones (yellow card) 22'; Clarke (yellow card) 45'; Pope 61'; Etuhu (yellow card) 89' (yellow-red card); Bolger (yellow card) 90+4'	Stadium: Glanford Park; Attendance: 3,188; Referee: Seb Stockbridge

23 April 2016 44	Bury	1–3	Millwall	Bury
15:00 GMT	Lowe 45+2'; Mayor (yellow card) 60'; Soares (yellow card) 80'	Report	Taylor 4', 83', (yellow card) 63'; Morison 33'; Martin (yellow card) 65'	Stadium: Gigg Lane; Attendance: 3,669; Referee: Steve Martin

30 April 2016 45	Chesterfield	3–0	Bury	Chesterfield
15:00 GMT	O'Shea 29' (pen.); Novak 45+2'; Gardener 71'	Report	Jones (yellow card) 25'; Bolger (yellow card) 29'; Pugh (yellow card) 32'; Mayor (yellow card) 49'; Lowe (yellow card) 55'	Stadium: Proact Stadium; Attendance: 7,232; Referee: Chris Sarginson

8 May 2016 46	Bury	3–2	Southend United	Bury
GMT	Barrett 21' (o.g.); Lowe 29', 90'	Report	Moussa 8'; Mooney 23'	Stadium: Gigg Lane; Attendance: 3,575

=== FA Cup ===
7 November 2015 First round	Bury	4–0	Wigan Athletic	Bury
15:00 GMT	Pope 18'; Mayor 34'; Cameron 45+2'; L. Clarke 65'	Report		Stadium: JD Stadium; Attendance: 3,856; Referee: David Coote

6 December 2015 Second round	Rochdale	0–1	Bury	Rochdale
12:00 GMT		Report	Rose 8'	Stadium: Spotland Stadium; Attendance: 4,887; Referee: Darren Drysdale

9 January 2016 Third round	Bury	0–0	Bradford City	Bury
15:00 GMT	Lowe (yellow card) 69'	Report	Hanson (yellow card) 13'	Stadium: JD Stadium; Attendance: 6,962; Referee: (England) Rob Lewis

19 January 2016 Third round reply	Bradford City	0–0 (a.e.t.) (2–4 p)	Bury	Bradford
19:45 GMT		Report	Cameron (yellow card) 37' (yellow-red card); Mayor (yellow card) 61'; Hussey (yellow card) 90+2'; Lawlor (yellow card) 107'	Stadium: Coral Windows Stadium; Attendance: 6,227; Referee: (England) Geoff Eltringham

30 January 2016 Fourth round	Bury	1–3	Hull City	Bury
15:00 GMT	Jones 86'	Report	Akpom 14' 57' (pen.) 69'	Stadium: JD Stadium; Attendance: 7,064; Referee: (England) Darren Bond

=== League Cup ===
11 August 2015 First round	Wigan Athletic	1–2	Bury	Wigan
19:45 BST	Grigg 46' (pen.)	Report	Clarke 63', 89' (pen.)	Stadium: DW Stadium; Attendance: 5,484; Referee: Mark Heywood

25 August 2015 Second round	Bury	1–4	Leicester City	Bury
19:45 BST	Mayor 49'	Report	Dodoo 25', 86', 90'; Kramarić 41'	Stadium: Gigg Lane

=== Football League Trophy ===
1 September 2015 First round	Accrington Stanley	1–2	Bury	Accrington
19:45 BST	Bruna 83'	Report	Hope 46'; Tutte 70'	Stadium: Crown Ground; Attendance: 1,344; Referee: Tony Harrington

6 October 2015 Second round	Bury	0–1	Morecambe	Bury
19:45 BST		Summary	Miller 81'	Stadium: Gigg Lane; Attendance: 1,508

=== Lancashire Senior Cup ===
13 October 2015 First round	Accrington Stanley	5–1	Bury	Accrington
14:00 BST				Stadium: Crown Ground
