= Danny Mayor =

English footballer

Personal information
- Full name: Daniel John Mayor
- Date of birth: 18 October 1990 (age 36)
- Place of birth: Leyland, England
- Height: 6 ft 0 in (1.83 m)
- Position: Winger

Team information
- Current team: AFC Fylde
- Number: 10

Youth career
- –2008: Preston North End

Senior career*
Years	Team	Apps	(Gls)
2008–2012	Preston North End	64	(2)
2009	→ Tranmere Rovers (loan)	3	(0)
2012–2014	Sheffield Wednesday	8	(0)
2013	→ Southend United (loan)	5	(0)
2013–2014	→ Bury (loan)	39	(5)
2014–2019	Bury	168	(25)
2019–2023	Plymouth Argyle	140	(6)
2023–2025	Fleetwood Town	72	(2)
2025–	AFC Fylde	12	(5)
- * Club domestic league appearances and goals as of 10:09, 10 August 2025 (UTC)

Daniel John Mayor (born 18 October 1990) is an English professional footballer who plays as a winger for National League club AFC Fylde.

He has played in the English Football League for Tranmere Rovers, Preston North End, Sheffield Wednesday, Southend United, Bury, Plymouth Argyle, and Fleetwood Town.

== Early life ==
Mayor was born in Leyland, Lancashire.

== Career ==
=== Preston North End ===
According to then manager Gary Peters, he revealed that Mayor joined Preston North End at age nine for £40 after his parents enrolled him to do the club's Centre of Excellence and was given "free bottle of milk and a season ticket for coming to the school". He went on to come through Preston's youth ranks. On 15 December 2008 he was given his first professional two-and-a-half-year contract with fellow youngster, Adam Barton.

On 5 March 2009, he joined Tranmere Rovers on a one-month loan deal. Tranmere manager Ronnie Moore was reported to say: "He is a hard working winger with the ability to go past people and has a trick up his sleeve." Two days later, on 7 March 2009, he was handed his League One debut against Northampton Town, where he set up a goal for Bas Savage. After the match, Manager Moore praised Mayor performance, citing he "direct, took people on and played a great ball in for the goal." After making three appearances, Mayor returned to Preston, where manager Alan Irvine believed that the loan move to Tranmere Rovers made him "grow up", due to giving him "more confidence".

Mayor made his debut for Preston North End on 16 January 2010 against Bristol City. He came on as a substitute in the 70th minute for Richard Chaplow. Preston lost the match 4–2. It was Darren Ferguson's debut as Preston manager. Due to Ferguson started to use youngsters in the first team, He was handed his full home debut in a game against Scunthorpe United on 10 April 2010, a game which Preston won 3–2. At the start of 2010–11 season, Mayor signed a two-year contract that will keep him until 2013.

After making 21 league appearances in the 2010–11 season, which resulted the relegation to League One, Mayor scored his first League goal for Preston against his old club Tranmere Rovers on 26 September 2011. His next goal came against Hartlepool United, which went on to win the goal of the season for the club's 2011–12 season and also went on to be awarded the Young Player of the Year. The 2011–12 season proved to be a breakthrough for Mayor, as he made a very impressive displays and become the fan favourite.

Mayor allegedly told manager Graham Westley before the 2012/13 season that he would like to play at a higher level, with teammate Jamie Proctor making the same statement, despite the pair both being contracted to the club and part of the manager's plans. As a result of wanting to leave, Preston chairman Peter Ridsdale was unsure towards the Mayor and Proctor.

=== Sheffield Wednesday ===
After being unsettled at the club, Mayor was linked with a move to Blackpool, before a bid for Mayor from Championship side Sheffield Wednesday was accepted, with Manager Dave Jones stating that he "would be a good addition". One day later, Mayor joined the club for an undisclosed fee on a three-year contract.

Mayor made his debut on 1 September 2012 for the club, coming on as a substitute in the 84th minute, in a 2–1 loss against Crystal Palace. He soon have his first team opportunities become limited since joining the club.

He joined Southend United on an initial 28-day loan deal on Tuesday 12 February 2013, going straight into the first team to play against Cheltenham Town that night. The move occurred when the club needed a replacement for Michael Timlin, who was ruled out for the entire season. After making five appearances, Mayor's loan spell with Southend United came to an end.

=== Bury ===
Ahead of the 2013–14 season, Mayor joined Bury on a season-long loan, which kept him until the end of the 2013–14 season. He made his debut, coming on as a substitute, in a 2–0 loss against Chesterfield in the opening game of the season. Four weeks later, on 31 August 2013, Mayor scored his first goal from a 30-yard strike, in a 4–1 win over Cheltenham Town before setting up the fourth goal. Since scoring his first goal, Mayor began establishing himself as a first team regular. Mayor struggled to score further goals until scoring his second goal of the season, in a 3–0 win over Hartlepool United on 1 January 2014. He went on to make 42 appearances in all competitions, scoring five times.

At the end of the next season, Bury named Mayor as the Players' Player of the Season as part of End of Season Awards Dinner at the Village Hotel. It was also confirmed an Undisclosed Fee had been agreed with Sheffield Wednesday for his services, Mayor signed a three-year deal with Bury after the move was announced by the club's chairman, Stewart Day, who surprised fans at the End of Season Awards Dinner. Commenting on the move, Manager David Flitcroft said he believed Mayor had the experience of playing "with Championship quality".

Mayor's first game after signing for the club on a permanent basis came in the opening game of the season, a 1–0 loss against Cheltenham Town. Mayor's next goal came three weeks later, in a 2–1 win over Accrington Stanley. Mayor later scored two goals in two games to add his third and fourth goal between 11 October 2014 and 18 October 2014 against Wimbledon and Portsmouth Mayor did the same thing again when he scored later scored two goals in two games to add his fifth and sixth goal between 26 December 2014 and 28 December 2014 against Northampton Town and Mansfield Town. Mayor finished the season with eight league goals (eight overall), for which he was awarded as League Two Player of the Year and was also included in League Two's PFA Team of the Year.

=== Plymouth Argyle ===
Mayor signed for newly relegated League Two club Plymouth Argyle on 1 July 2019 on a contract of undisclosed length. Mayor recorded an assist on his debut against Crewe as Argyle won their first game of the 2019–20 season.

Following Plymouth's title-winning League One system, Mayor was released at the end of the 2022–23 season.

=== Fleetwood Town ===
On 26 June 2023, Mayor signed for Fleetwood Town on a two-year contract.

He departed the club at the end of the 2024–25 season following the expiry of his contract.

=== AFC Fylde ===
On 8 August 2025, Mayor joined National League North club AFC Fylde. He made his debut the following day, scoring his side's third goal from the bench to complete a 3–2 opening day comeback victory over Oxford City.

== Career statistics ==
As of end of 2024–25 season

Appearances and goals by club, season and competition
Club	Season	League			FA Cup		League Cup		Other		Total	
Club	Season	Division	Apps	Goals	Apps	Goals	Apps	Goals	Apps	Goals	Apps	Goals
Preston North End	2008–09	Championship	0	0	0	0	0	0	0	0	0	0
Preston North End	2009–10	Championship	7	0	1	0	0	0	—		8	0
Preston North End	2010–11	Championship	21	0	1	0	3	0	—		25	0
Preston North End	2011–12	League One	36	2	2	0	3	1	3 (Note: Appearances in Football League Trophy)	0	44	3
Preston North End	Total		64	2	4	0	6	1	3	0	77	3
Tranmere Rovers (loan)	2008–09	League One	3	0	—		—		—		3	0
Sheffield Wednesday	2012–13	Championship	8	0	1	0	0	0	—		9	0
Southend United (loan)	2012–13	League Two	5	0	—		—		0	0	5	0
Bury (loan)	2013–14	League Two	39	5	2	0	1	0	0	0	42	5
Bury	2014–15	League Two	44	8	3	0	1	0	2	0	50	8
Bury	2015–16	League One	44	5	5	1	2	1	2	0	53	7
Bury	2016–17	League One	21	3	1	0	1	0	2 (Note: Appearances in EFL Trophy)	0	25	3
Bury	2017–18	League One	20	1	1	0	0	0	0	0	21	1
Bury	2018–19	League Two	39	8	2	1	0	0	3	3	44	12
Bury	Total		207	30	14	2	5	1	9	3	235	36
Plymouth Argyle	2019–20	League Two	34	1	3	0	2	0	0	0	39	1
Plymouth Argyle	2020–21	League One	44	1	3	0	2	1	0	0	49	2
Plymouth Argyle	2021–22	League One	33	3	5	0	1	0	2	0	41	3
Plymouth Argyle	2022–23	League One	29	1	0	0	1	0	4	0	34	1
Plymouth Argyle	Total		140	6	11	0	6	1	6	0	163	7
Fleetwood Town	2023–24	League One	33	0	2	0	1	0	3	0	39	0
Fleetwood Town	2024–25	League Two	39	2	1	0	3	0	0	0	43	2
Fleetwood Town	Total		72	2	3	0	4	0	3	0	82	2
Career total			499	40	33	2	21	3	21	3	574	48

== Honours ==
Bury

- Football League/EFL League Two second-place promotion: 2018–19; third-place promotion: 2014–15

Plymouth Argyle

- EFL League One: 2022–23
- EFL League Two third-place promotion: 2019–20
- EFL Trophy runner-up: 2022–23

Individual

- PFA Team of the Year: 2014–15 League Two, 2018–19 League Two, 2019–20 League Two
- Football League Two Player of the Year: 2014–15
