= Craig Jones (footballer, born 1987) =

English-born Welsh footballer

Personal information
- Full name: Craig Stephen Jones
- Date of birth: 20 March 1987 (age 39)
- Place of birth: Chester, England
- Positions: Right wing; right back

Senior career*
Years	Team	Apps	(Gls)
2004–2005	Airbus UK Broughton	55	(9)
2005–2007	Aberystwyth Town	32	(11)
2007–2009	Rhyl	74	(14)
2009–2012	The New Saints	111	(25)
2012–2018	Bury	158	(9)
2018	Connah's Quay Nomads	4	(0)

International career
2007–2010	Wales under-23 semi-pro	6	(0)
2008–2012	Wales semi-professional	3	(3)
- * Club domestic league appearances and goals as of 17:46, 7 December 2018 (UTC)

Craig Jones (born 20 March 1987) is retired footballer who played as a midfielder. Previously, he was club captain at Bury. He is a three times Welsh Premier League champion. He previously played for Welsh clubs Airbus UK Broughton, Aberystwyth Town, Rhyl, TNS and Connah's Quay.

== Club career ==
Jones' career started with Airbus UK Broughton and Aberystwyth Town. He joined Rhyl in the May 2007, winning a Welsh Premier League championship medal with the club and representing them in Europe. He then joined The New Saints in May 2009. He played for the club in qualifying rounds of the UEFA Champions League, against clubs such as Helsingborg, Anderlecht, and Bohemians scoring in both home legs against the Belgian and Irish champions. In July 2012, he played his final matches for The New Saints playing a significant role in both legs of the second-round qualifying matches of the UEFA Champions League against Swedish Treble-winning side (comprising Super Cup, League and Swedish Cup titles) Helsingborg. In total he scored 25 goals in 111 appearances for the club.

In January 2012 he went on trial with Leeds United for seven days. After attracting interest from several English League and European Clubs, Jones signed a two-year deal with League One club Bury in August 2012, after Bury paid out an undisclosed fee for his services from TNS.

He was released by Bury at the end of the 2017–18 season.

In August 2018, Jones returned to the Welsh Premier League signing for Connah's Quay Nomads. Jones made six appearances in all competitions for the Nomads, including playing in a Scottish Challenge Cup victory over Falkirk where he assisted the winning goal. He departed the club three months later after struggling to attain the required level of fitness.

== International career ==
Jones won 9 caps for Wales at the semi-pro under-23 level, and captained the side once. He was selected for the senior semi-pro team for the 2008 Four Nations, scoring a hat-trick against Gibraltar.

== Personal life ==
His father Brynley was also a professional football player, having played for Chester City in the Football League, as well as Bangor City and Oswestry Town.

== Career statistics ==
As of match played 12 September 2017

Appearances and goals by club, season and competition
Club	Season	League			FA Cup		League Cup		Other		Total	
Club	Season	Division	Apps	Goals	Apps	Goals	Apps	Goals	Apps	Goals	Apps	Goals
Bury	2013–14	League Two	37	1	2	0	2	0	0	0	41	1
Bury	2014–15	League Two	40	3	2	0	0	0	1 (Note: Appearances in the Football League Trophy)	0	43	3
Bury	2015–16	League One	36	3	3	1	1	0	2	0	42	4
Bury	2016–17	League One	13	0	0	0	1	0	1 (Note: Appearance in the EFL Trophy)	0	15	0
Bury	2017–18	League One	3	0	0	0	1	0	0	0	4	0
Bury	Bury total		129	7	7	1	5	0	4	0	145	8
Career total			129	7	7	1	5	0	4	0	145	8

== Honours ==
with Rhyl

- Welsh Premier League champion: 2008–09
- Welsh League Cup runner-up: 2008

with The New Saints

- Welsh Premier League champion: 2009–10 & 2011–12
- Welsh Premier League runner-up: 2010–11
- Welsh Cup winner: 2012
- Welsh League Cup winner: 2009, 2010 & 2011

Individual

- Welsh Premier League Young Player of the Season: 2009–10
- Welsh Premier League Team of the Year: 2008–09, 2009–10 2010–11, 2011–12
