= 2014–15 Bury F.C. season =

Bury F.C.
2014–15 season
- Chairman: Stewart Day
- Manager: David Flitcroft
- League Two: 3rd (Promoted)
- FA Cup: 2nd round
- League Cup: 1st round
- Football League Trophy: Quarter final (North)
- Top goalscorer: League: Daniel Nardiello (10); All: Daniel Nardiello (14)
- Highest home attendance: 8,396 vs. Southend United, 21 April 2015
- Lowest home attendance: 1,681 vs. Morecambe, 7 October 2014
- Average home league attendance: 3,774
Home colours	Away colours

During the 2014–15 season, Bury competed in the fourth tier of English football, Football League Two.

== Match details ==
=== Pre-season ===
9 July 2014	Radcliffe Borough	1–4	Bury	Stainton Park, Radcliffe
19:30 BST	McGinley 68'	Report	Burke 2'; Grimes 50', 55'; Laus 83'

18 July 2014	Bury	1–3	Sheffield Wednesday	Bury
19:45 BST	Nardiello 40'	Report	Maghoma 3'; Nuhiu 56'; Coke 80'	Stadium: Gigg Lane

30 July 2014	Bury	1–1	Blackburn Rovers	Bury
19:45 BST	Nardiello 71'	Report	Williamson (red card) 45'; Rhodes 85' (pen.)	Stadium: Gigg Lane

2 August 2014	Bury	3–3	Rochdale	Bury
15:00 BST	Eastham 1' (o.g.); Nardiello 41'; Lowe 44'	Report	Bennett 9'; Logan 69', 90'	Stadium: Gigg Lane

=== League Two ===
==== League table ====
Pos	Team	Pld	W	D	L	GF	GA	GD	Pts	Promotion, qualification or relegation
1	Burton Albion (C, P)	46	28	10	8	69	39	+30	94	Promotion to Football League One
2	Shrewsbury Town (P)	46	27	8	11	67	31	+36	89	Promotion to Football League One
3	Bury (P)	46	26	7	13	60	40	+20	85	Promotion to Football League One
4	Wycombe Wanderers	46	23	15	8	67	45	+22	84	Qualification for League Two play-offs (Note: Four teams play for one spot and promotion to Football League One.)
5	Southend United (O, P)	46	24	12	10	54	38	+16	84	Qualification for League Two play-offs

Updated to match(es) played on 23 May 2015. Source: BBC Sport
Rules for classification: 1) Points; 2) Goal difference; 3) Number of goals scored
(C) Champions; (O) Play-off winners; (P) Promoted

==== Matches ====
The fixtures for the 2014–15 season were announced on 18 June 2014 at 9am.

9 August 2014 1	Bury	0–1	Cheltenham Town	Bury
15:00 BST		Report	Hanks 42'	Stadium: Gigg Lane; Attendance: 3,376; Referee: Eddie Ilderton

16 August 2014 2	Hartlepool United	0–2	Bury	Hartlepool
16:00			Daniel Nardiello 18'; Danny Rose 73'	Stadium: Victoria Park; Attendance: 3,246; Referee: Gary John Sutton

19 August 2014 3	Luton Town	1–1	Bury	Luton
19:45	Ruddock 90+1'	Report	Rose 62'	Stadium: Kenilworth Road; Attendance: 7,890; Referee: Tim Robinson

23 August 2014 4	Bury	2–1	Plymouth Argyle	Bury
15:00	Soares 5'; Rose 15'	Report	Reid 66' (pen.)	Stadium: Gigg Lane; Attendance: 3,156; Referee: James Adcock

30 August 2014 5	Bury	2–1	Accrington Stanley	Bury
15:00	Rose 35'; Mayor 62'; McNulty (red card) 70'	Report	Naismith 19'	Stadium: Gigg Lane; Attendance: 3,381; Referee: Kevin Wright

6 September 2014 6	Wycombe Wanderers	0–0	Bury	High Wycombe
15:00		Report		Stadium: Adams Park; Attendance: 3,483; Referee: Kevin Johnson

13 September 2014 7	Carlisle United	0–3	Bury	Carlisle
15:00		Report	Rose 48'; Jones 59'; Lowe 80'	Stadium: Brunton Park; Attendance: 3,975; Referee: Mark Brown

16 September 2014 8	Bury	2–1	Stevenage	Bury
19:45	Lowe 13'; Jones 47'	Report	Marriott 10'; Johnson (yellow card) 89' (yellow-red card) 90+4'	Stadium: Gigg Lane; Attendance: 2,638; Referee: Richard Clark

20 September 2014 9	Bury	3–1	Burton Albion	Bury
15:00	Nardiello 48', 66'; Lowe 57'	Report	Blyth 88'	Stadium: Gigg Lane; Attendance: 4,536; Referee: Geoff Eltringham

27 September 2014 10	Exeter City	2–1	Bury	Exeter
15:00	Grimes 5'; Davies (yellow card) 34'; Keohane 83'	Report	Mayor (yellow card) 45+4'; Soares 59'	Stadium: St James Park; Attendance: 3,215 (254 Bury fans); Referee: Stuart Attwell

4 October 2014 11	Bury	2–0	Tranmere Rovers	Bury
15:00	Etuhu 55'; Soares (yellow card) 58'; Nardiello 87'	Report	Donnelly (yellow card) 37'; Gill (yellow card) 48'	Stadium: Gigg Lane; Attendance: 4,481; Referee: Andy Haines

11 October 2014 12	AFC Wimbledon	3–2	Bury	Kingston upon Thames
15:00 BST (UTC+01)	Akinfenwa 26', 37'; Tubbs 54'; Bulman (yellow card) 61'; Fuller (yellow card) 73'; Moore (yellow card) 87'	Report	Mayor 49'; Lowe (yellow card) 73'; Soares (yellow card) 82'; Cameron (yellow card) 88'	Stadium: Kingsmeadow; Attendance: 4,268; Referee: Gavin Ward

18 October 2014 13	Bury	3–0	Portsmouth	Bury
15:00	Mayor 9'; Etuhu (yellow card) 29'; Lowe 44'; Rose 61'	Report	Drennan (yellow card) 21'; Devera (yellow card) 69'; Wallace (yellow card) 81'	Stadium: Gigg Lane; Attendance: 4,259; Referee: Bobby Madley

21 October 2014 14	Shrewsbury Town	5–0	Bury	Shrewsbury
19:45	Akpa Akpro 3', 35', 51'; Goldson 19'; Clark 73'	Report	Soares (yellow card) 11'; Mills (yellow card) 48'	Stadium: Greenhous Meadow; Attendance: 4,233; Referee: Andy Woolmer

25 October 2014 15	Southend United	1–1	Bury	Southend-on-Sea
15:00	Corr 37'; Worrall (yellow card) 73'; Prosser (yellow card) 81'; Payne (yellow card) 84'	Report	Binnom-Williams (yellow card) 51'; Jones 71'; Mills (yellow card) 84'; Tutte (yellow card) 90+1'; Kennedy (yellow card) 90+3'	Stadium: Roots Hall; Attendance: 5,174; Referee: Darren Drysdale

1 November 2014 16	Bury	2–0	Cambridge United	Bury
15:00	Adams 13'; Soares (yellow card) 15'; Rose 28'; Duffus (yellow card) 77'	BBC Report	Donaldson (yellow card) 69'; Coulson (yellow card) 76'	Stadium: Gigg Lane; Attendance: 3,704; Referee: Graham Horwood

15 November 2014 17	Morecambe	1–0	Bury	Morecambe
14:30	Fleming (yellow card) 55'; Ellison 70'	BBC Report	Cameron (yellow card) 81'	Stadium: Globe Arena; Attendance: 2,665; Referee: (England) David Coote

22 November 2014 18	Bury	1–3	Newport County	Bury
15:00	Rose 61'	Report	O'Connor 3', 43', 90+3'; Zebroski (yellow card) 78'; Jones (yellow card) 82'	Stadium: Gigg Lane; Attendance: 3,166; Referee: Carl Boyeson

29 November 2014 19	Bury	0–2	Dagenham & Redbridge	Bury
15:00	Soares (yellow card) 55'; Mayor (yellow card) 60'	Report	Hemmings (yellow card) 50'; Jakubiak 55'; Cureton 74'; Batt (yellow card) 89'	Stadium: Gigg Lane; Attendance: 3,042; Referee: Andy Madley

13 December 2014 20	Oxford United	2–1	Bury	Oxford
15:00	Riley (yellow card) 45+2'; Holmes-Dennis (yellow card) 59'; Mullins (yellow card) 67'; Jones 69' (o.g.); Barnett 90'	Report	Cameron (yellow card) 19'; McNulty (yellow card) 44'; Jones (yellow card) 61'; Mayor 63'	Stadium: Kassam Stadium; Attendance: 6,912; Referee: Steve Martin

20 December 2014 21	Bury	2–2	York City	Bury
15:00	Mills (yellow card) 26'; Cameron (yellow card) 44'; Tutte 57'; Nardiello 62'	Report	Ilesanmi (yellow card) 33'; Hyde 66'; Summerfield 78' (yellow card) 83'; Halliday (yellow card) 89'	Stadium: Gigg Lane; Attendance: 3,313; Referee: Mark Haywood

26 December 2014 22	Northampton Town	2–3	Bury	Northampton
15:00	Richards 6'; Horwood (yellow card) 50'; Toney (red card) 64'; Hackett 77'	Report	El-Abd (yellow card) 18'; Tutte 30'; Soares 45'; Mayor 57'; White (red card) 65'; Hussey (yellow card) 83'	Stadium: Sixfields Stadium; Attendance: 4,563

28 December 2014 23	Bury	2–0	Mansfield Town	Bury
15:00	Lowe 40'; Tutte (yellow card) 67'; Mayor 77'	Report	McGuire (yellow card) 63'	Stadium: Gigg Lane; Attendance: 3,196

3 January 2015 24	Dagenham & Redbridge	1–0	Bury	Dagenham
15:00	Labadie (yellow card) 45+1'; Murphy 51'; Boucaud (yellow card) 84'	Report	Lowe (yellow card) 37'; Rose (yellow card) 82'	Stadium: Victoria Road; Attendance: 1,877

17 January 2015 25	Bury	1–1	Wycombe Wanderers	Bury
15:00	Lowe (yellow card) 17'; Mayor 32'; El-Abd (yellow card) 42'	Report	Onyedinma 68'	Stadium: Gigg Lane; Attendance: 2,932

24 January 2015 26	Bury	2–1	Carlisle United	Bury
15:00	Nardiello 16' (pen.), 62'; Hussey (yellow card) 87'	Report	Rigg 22'; Meppen-Walter (yellow card) 47'	Stadium: Gigg Lane; Attendance: 3,589

27 January 2015 27	Accrington Stanley	0–1	Bury	Accrington
19:45	Atkinson (yellow card) 80'	Report	Cameron (yellow card) 68' (goal) 81'; El-Abd (yellow card) 70'	Stadium: Crown Ground; Attendance: 2,067

31 January 2015 28	Burton Albion	1–0	Bury	Burton upon Trent
15:00	Edwards 62'	Report	Tutte (yellow card) 88'	Stadium: Pirelli Stadium; Attendance: 3,049; Referee: Stuart Attwell

7 February 2015 29	Bury	1–1	Exeter City	Bury
15:00	Cameron (yellow card) 13'; Nardiello 45'	Report	Davies 13'; McAllister (yellow card) 57'; Oakley (yellow card) 65'	Stadium: Gigg Lane; Attendance: 3,513; Referee: Nigel Miller

10 February 2015 30	Stevenage	0–0	Bury	Stevenage
19:45		Report		Stadium: Broadhall Way; Attendance: 2,165; Referee: Graham Horwood

14 February 2015 31	Cheltenham Town	1–2	Bury	Cheltenham
15:00	Johnstone 24'; Burns (yellow card) 90+3'; Richards (yellow card) 90+5'	Report	Mayor 4'; Rose 17' (yellow card) 73'; Riley (yellow card) 82'; Adams (yellow card) 90+5'	Stadium: Whaddon Road; Attendance: 2,375; Referee: Charles Breakspear

21 February 2015 32	Bury	1–0	Hartlepool United	Bury
15:00 GMT	Rose (yellow card) 54'; Tutte 75'	Report	Austin (yellow card) 48'	Stadium: Gigg Lane; Attendance: 3,172; Referee: (England) Chris Sarginson

28 February 2015 33	Plymouth Argyle	0–2	Bury	Plymouth
15:00 GMT	Alessandra (yellow card) 90+2'	Report	El-Abd (yellow card) 54'; Nardiello 62'; Rose 90' (yellow card) 90+2'	Stadium: Home Park; Attendance: 7,374; Referee: (England)

3 March 2015 34	Bury	1–0	Luton Town	Bury
19:45 GMT	Soares 9'; Lowe (yellow card) 90+1'	Report	Cullen (yellow card) 73'	Stadium: Gigg Lane; Attendance: 2,915; Referee: (England) Scott Duncan

7 March 2015 35	Bury	0–1	Oxford United	Bury
15:00 GMT	El-Abd (yellow card) 6' (yellow-red card); Mayor (yellow card) 48'; Riley (yellow card) 65'; McNulty (yellow card) 72'; Tutte (yellow card) 88'	Report	MacDonald (yellow card) 13'; Roofe (yellow card) 45+1'; Baldock (yellow card) 77'; O'Dowda 85'; Hylton (yellow card) 87'	Stadium: Gigg Lane; Attendance: 3,645; Referee: (England) Kevin Johnson

15 March 2015 36	Mansfield Town	0–1	Bury	Mansfield
15:00 GMT		Report	Tafazolli (o.g.)	Stadium: Field Mill; Attendance: 2,868; Referee: (England) Darren Sheldrake

17 March 2015 37	York City	0–1	Bury	York
19:45 GMT		Report	Soares 9'	Stadium: Bootham Crescent; Attendance: 3,194; Referee: (England) Andy Madley

21 March 2015 38	Bury	2–1	Northampton Town	Bury
15:00 GMT	Riley (red card); Etuhu 66'; El-Abd 90+1'	Report	Holmes 10'	Stadium: Gigg Lane; Attendance: 3,969; Referee: (England) David Coote

3 April 2015 39	Cambridge United	0–2	Bury	Cambridge
15:00 BST		Report	Cameron 23'; Soares 53'	Stadium: Abbey Stadium; Attendance: 5,427; Referee: (England) Mark Brown

6 April 2015 40	Bury	1–2	Morecambe	Bury
15:00 BST	Eaves 17'	Report	Amond 79'; Mullin 85'	Stadium: Gigg Lane; Attendance: 4,045; Referee: (England) Darren Bond

11 April 2015 41	Newport County	0–2	Bury	Newport
15:00 BST		Report	Lowe 21'; Nardiello 88'	Stadium: Rodney Parade; Attendance: 3,123; Referee: (England) Oliver Langford

14 April 2015 42	Bury	1–0	Shrewsbury Town	Bury
19:45 BST	Riley 57'	Report		Stadium: Gigg Lane; Attendance: 4,277; Referee: (England) Dean Whitestone

18 April 2015 43	Portsmouth	0–1	Bury	Portsmouth
15:00 BST		Report	Lowe 45'	Stadium: Fratton Park; Attendance: 14,569; Referee: (England) James Adcock

21 April 2015 44	Bury	0–1	Southend United	Bury
19:45 BST		Report	Worrall 74'	Stadium: Gigg Lane; Attendance: 8,396; Referee: (England) Tony Harrington

25 April 2015 45	Bury	2–0	AFC Wimbledon	Bury
15:00 BST	Soares 33'; Lowe 77'	Report		Stadium: Gigg Lane; Attendance: 4,099; Referee: (England) Geoff Eltringham

2 May 2015 46	Tranmere Rovers	0–1	Bury	Birkenhead
15:00 BST		Report	Soares 61'	Stadium: Prenton Park; Attendance: 7,518; Referee: (England) Simon Hooper

=== FA Cup ===
The draw for the first round of the FA Cup was made on 27 October 2014.

8 November 2014 Round One	Bury	3–1	Hemel Hempstead Town	Bury
15:00	Tutte 16'; Cameron 88'; Nardiello 90+4'	Report	Potton 10'	Stadium: Gigg Lane; Attendance: 2,944; Referee: Andy Haines

6 December 2014 Round Two	Bury	1–1	Luton Town	Gigg Lane, Bury
15:00	Soares (yellow card) 24'; Mills (yellow card) 62'; Nardiello 90+1'	Report	Cullen 51'; Howells (yellow card) 77'	Attendance: 2,790; Referee: Nigel Miller

16 December 2014 Replay	Luton Town	1–0	Bury	Kenilworth Road, Luton
19:45	Rooney 48'	Report	Cameron (yellow card) 68'	Attendance: 2,923; Referee: Oliver Langford

=== League Cup ===
The draw for the first round was made on 17 June 2014 at 10am. Bury were drawn away to Bolton Wanderers.

12 August 2014 Round One	Bolton Wanderers	3–2 (a.e.t.)	Bury	Bolton
20:00	Davies 90+7' (pen.); Danns 93', 96'	Report	Lowe 20'; McNulty 97'	Stadium: Macron Stadium; Attendance: 9,249; Referee: Jeremy Simpson

=== Football League Trophy ===
7 October 2014 Round Two	Bury	3–1	Morecambe	Bury
19:45	Nardiello 14' (pen.), 39'; Soares (yellow card) 76'; Hussey (yellow card) 84'; Lowe (yellow card) 90+1' (goal) 90+4'; Rose (yellow card) 90+2'; Jalal (yellow card) 90+3'	Report	Beeley 74'	Stadium: Gigg Lane; Attendance: 1,681; Referee: Graham Salisbury

11 November 2014 Round Three	Bury	1–2	Tranmere Rovers	Bury
19:45	Cameron 35'	BBC Report	Power 43'; Johnson 45'	Stadium: Gigg Lane; Attendance: 1,842; Referee: Oliver Langford

== Transfers ==
=== In ===
No.	Pos.	Nat.	Name	Age	EU	Moving from	Type	Transfer window	Ends	Transfer fee	Source
8	MF	(Wales)	Nicky Adams	27	EU	Rotherham United	Transfer	Summer	2017	Undisclosed	BBC Sport
11	DF	(England)	Chris Hussey	26	EU	Burton Albion	Free transfer	Summer	2016	Free	Bury F.C
1	GK	(England)	Shwan Jalal	30	EU	Bournemouth	Free transfer	Summer	2016	Free	Vital Football
10	MF	(England)	Danny Mayor	22	EU	Sheffield Wednesday	Transfer	Summer	2017	Undisclosed	Bury F.C
16	DF	(England)	Kiel O'Brien	20–21	EU	Chorley	Free transfer	Summer	2016	Free	Bury F.C
6	MF	(Nigeria)	Kelvin Etuhu	26	EU	Barnsley	Free transfer	Summer	2016	Free	Bury F.C
14	MF	(England)	Joe Thompson	25	EU	Tranmere Rovers	Free transfer	Summer	2015	Free	Bury F.C
21	DF	(England)	Joe Widdowson	25	EU	Northampton Town	Free transfer	Summer	2015	Free	Bury F.C
30	FW	(England)	James Poole	24	EU	Hartlepool United	Free transfer	Summer	Undisclosed	Free	Bury F.C
9	FW	(England)	Danny Rose	20	EU	Barnsley	Transfer	Summer	2017	Undisclosed	Bury F.C
7	FW	(England)	Hallam Hope	20	EU	Everton	Transfer	Winter	2018	Undisclosed	Bury F.C
23	DF	(England)	Joe Riley	23	EU	Bolton Wanderers	Free transfer	Winter	2017	Free	Bury F.C

=== Out ===
No.	Pos.	Nat.	Name	Age	EU	Moving to	Type	Transfer window	Transfer fee	Source
1	GK	(Northern Ireland)	Trevor Carson	26	EU	Cheltenham Town	Released	Summer	Free	Bury F.C; BBC Sport
4	DF	(England)	Richard Hinds	33	EU	Llandudno (Wales)	Released	Summer	Free	Bury F.C
21	GK	(Denmark)	Brian Jensen	38	EU	Crawley Town	Released	Summer	Free	Bury F.C; BBC Sport
—	DF	(Scotland)	Robbie McIntyre	20	EU	Free agent	Released	Summer	Free	Bury F.C
8	MF	(England)	Tommy Miller	35	EU	Hartlepool United	Released	Summer	Free	Bury F.C; Hartlepool Mail
35	MF	(England)	Tope Obadeyi	24	EU	Kilmarnock (Scotland)	Released	Summer	Free	Bury F.C; Scotsman
14	MF	(England)	Lewis Young	24	EU	Crawley Town	Released	Summer	Free	Bury F.C; BBC Sport
30	GK	(England)	Reice Charles-Cook	20	EU	Coventry City	Free transfer	Summer	Free	Coventry Mad
23	FW	(England)	Ashley Grimes	27	EU	Walsall	Mutual Consent	Summer	Free	Bury F.C; The Football League
—	MF	(Iran)	Navid Nasseri	17–18	EU	Birmingham City	Free transfer	Summer	Free	Bury F.C
6	MF	(England)	Andrew Procter	31	EU	Accrington Stanley	Free transfer	Summer	Free	BBC Sport
21	DF	(England)	Joe Widdowson	25	EU	Dagenham & Redbridge	Free transfer	Winter	Free	BBC Sport
1	GK	(England)	Shwan Jalal	31	EU	Northampton Town	Free transfer	Winter	Free	BBC Sport

EU = if holds or not a European Union passport; Country: when 2 flags, 1st flag = country that plays for internationally, 2nd flag = country of birth; N = number on jersey; P = Position (for position name, pause mouse pointer on abbreviation); Name = Name on jersey (for more extensive name, pause mouse pointer on name); Age = age on the day of the signing; Moving from = only indicate the club the player was playing before start playing for this club in this season, for the type of the moving see Status column; Moving to = only indicates the club the player is going to play next, for the type of the moving see Status column; Ends = when the player's current contract ends; n/a = Not applicable.

=== Loans in ===
No.	Pos.	Name	Country	Age	Loan club	Started	Ended	Start source	End source
9	FW	Danny Rose	(England)	20	Barnsley	15 August 2014	September 2014	Bury F.C	
28	MF	Duane Holmes	(United States)	19	Huddersfield Town	30 August 2014	29 October 2014	Bury F.C	Bury F.C
33	DF	Tom Kennedy	(England)	29	Rochdale	23 October 2014	14 January 2015	Bury F.C	
18	FW	Courtney Duffus	(England)	19	Everton	24 October 2014	January 2015	Bury F.C	
25	DF	Hayden White	(England)	19	Bolton Wanderers	7 November 2014	4 January 2015	Bury F.C	
13	GK	Scott Loach	(England)	26	Rotherham United	10 November 2014	1 December 2014	Bury F.C	TeamTalk
5	DF	Adam El-Abd	(Egypt)	30	Bristol City	26 November 2014	30 June 2015	Bury F.C; Bury F.C	
18	MF	Robert Milsom	(England)	27	Rotherham United	26 November 2014	10 January 2015	Bury F.C	
21	GK	Nick Pope	(England)	22	Charlton Athletic	6 January 2015	30 June 2015	Bury F.C	
—	DF	Rob Holding	(England)	19	Bolton Wanderers	26 March 2015	30 June 2015	Bury F.C	

Sources: For loan start source see "Start source". For loan end source see "End source".
EU = if holds or not a European Union passport; Country: when 2 flags, 1st flag = country that plays for internationally, 2nd flag = country of birth; No. = number on jersey; P = Position (for position name, pause mouse pointer on abbreviation); Name = Name on jersey (for more extensive name, pause mouse pointer on name); In/Out = In: The player came in on loan, Out: The player went out on loan; Loan club = the club that the player moved on loan to or the club that the player came from on loan; Started = the date when the player's loan started; Ended = the date when the player's loan ended.

=== Loans out ===
No.	Pos.	Name	Country	Age	Loan club	Started	Ended	Start source	End source
21	DF	Joe Widdowson	(England)	25	Morecambe	29 August 2014	28 October 2014	Bury F.C	
21	DF	Joe Widdowson	(England)	25	Dagenham & Redbridge	27 November 2014	4 January 2015	Bury F.C	
34	DF	Pablo Mills	(England)	30	Cheltenham Town	26 February 2015	30 June 2015	BBC Sport	

Sources: For loan start source see "Start source". For loan end source see "End source".
EU = if holds or not a European Union passport; Country: when 2 flags, 1st flag = country that plays for internationally, 2nd flag = country of birth; No. = number on jersey; P = Position (for position name, pause mouse pointer on abbreviation); Name = Name on jersey (for more extensive name, pause mouse pointer on name); In/Out = In: The player came in on loan, Out: The player went out on loan; Loan club = the club that the player moved on loan to or the club that the player came from on loan; Started = the date when the player's loan started; Ended = the date when the player's loan ended.
