= Danny Rose (footballer, born 1993) =

English footballer

Personal information
- Full name: Daniel Antony Rose
- Date of birth: 10 December 1993 (age 32)
- Place of birth: Barnsley, England
- Height: 5 ft 8 in (1.73 m)
- Position: Striker

Team information
- Current team: Exeter City
- Number: 32

Youth career
- –2011: Barnsley

Senior career*
Years	Team	Apps	(Gls)
2011–2014	Barnsley	17	(1)
2014	→ Bury (loan)	6	(3)
2014	→ Bury (loan)	1	(1)
2014–2016	Bury	62	(14)
2016–2020	Mansfield Town	141	(38)
2020–2022	Northampton Town	75	(5)
2022–2023	Stevenage	43	(6)
2023–2026	Grimsby Town	95	(29)
2026	Barrow	25	(4)
2026–	Exeter City	4	(0)
- * Club domestic league appearances and goals as of 11:48, 27 September 2026 (UTC)

Daniel Antony Rose (born 10 December 1993) is an English professional footballer who plays as a striker for EFL League Two club Exeter City.

== Career ==
=== Barnsley ===
Born in Barnsley, Rose signed his first professional contract with hometown club Barnsley in March 2011, alongside Jordan Clark. He made his senior debut in the Football League on 25 April 2011, in a 2–2 draw at home to Doncaster Rovers. He scored his first goal for Barnsley against Burnley in the FA Cup on 5 January 2013. He scored the winning goal two minutes after coming on as a substitute. He scored his first league goal for the club on 19 January 2013, rescuing a late point for Barnsley in a 1–1 draw against Ipswich Town.

=== Bury ===
On 27 March 2014, Rose joined League Two side Bury on loan. He was recalled by Barnsley on 22 April 2014. He re-joined Bury on loan, with a view to a permanent contract, on 15 August 2014. He signed permanently for Bury three days later, signing a three-year contract on 18 August 2014.

=== Mansfield Town ===
In May 2016 Rose signed for Nottinghamshire club Mansfield Town. He scored on his debut in a 3–2 win over Newport County on 6 August 2016. In June 2019 he was linked with a transfer away from Mansfield.

=== Northampton Town ===
On 2 October 2020, Rose joined League One side Northampton Town for an undisclosed fee, signing a two-year deal.

=== Stevenage ===
In May 2022 it was announced that he would sign for Stevenage on 1 July 2022.

=== Grimsby Town ===
On 8 June 2023, Rose signed for Grimsby Town from Stevenage for an undisclosed fee, agreeing a two-year contract. He was appointed club captain for the 2023–24 season and made his debut wearing the captain's armband in a goalless home draw against AFC Wimbledon on 5 August. Rose scored his first Grimsby goal the following week, opening the scoring in a 3–2 defeat away to Notts County.

Rose finished his first season as Grimsby's leading goalscorer with 15 goals in 41 appearances across all competitions. His performances saw him win three end-of-season awards: the club's supporter-voted Player of the Year award, the Disabled Supporters' Club Player of the Year award and the Grimsby Town Travelling Supporters' Player of the Year award.

On 25 October 2024, Grimsby exercised an additional year in Rose's contract, extending his stay until the summer of 2026. Head coach David Artell described Rose as an important figure both on and off the pitch, citing his captaincy, leadership and goalscoring record.

Rose scored another 15 goals in all competitions during the 2024–25 season, including a club-leading 14 goals in League Two.

Rose made his 100th appearance for Grimsby in an EFL Cup fourth-round tie against Brentford on 28 October 2025. On 19 January 2026, he joined League Two rivals Barrow for an undisclosed fee after being offered an 18-month contract by the Cumbrian club. He left Grimsby having scored 35 goals in 107 appearances across all competitions. Rose was a popular figure among the club's supporters.

=== Barrow ===
On 19 January 2026, it was announced that Rose had left Grimsby to join fellow League Two outfit Barrow for an undisclosed fee. Rose went on to make 21 appearances for the club, scoring 4 goals, in a season which saw the side finish bottom, and be relegated to the National League.

=== Exeter City ===
On 1 September 2026, Rose agreed a deadline day transfer to return to League Two with Exeter City, signing a two-year deal with the club.

== Career statistics ==
As of match played on 26 September 2026

Club	Season	League			FA Cup		League Cup		Other		Total	
Club	Season	Division	Apps	Goals	Apps	Goals	Apps	Goals	Apps	Goals	Apps	Goals
Barnsley	2010–11	Championship	1	0	0	0	0	0	0	0	1	0
Barnsley	2011–12	Championship	4	0	0	0	0	0	0	0	4	0
Barnsley	2012–13	Championship	8	1	1	1	0	0	0	0	9	2
Barnsley	2013–14	Championship	3	0	0	0	0	0	0	0	3	0
Barnsley	2014–15	League One	1	0	0	0	0	0	0	0	1	0
Barnsley	Total		17	1	1	1	0	0	0	0	18	2
Bury (loan)	2013–14	League Two	6	3	0	0	0	0	0	0	6	3
Bury (loan)	2014–15	League Two	1	1	0	0	0	0	0	0	1	1
Bury	2014–15	League Two	34	9	3	0	0	0	2	0	39	9
Bury	2015–16	League One	28	5	4	1	1	0	1	0	34	6
Bury	Total		62	14	7	1	1	0	3	0	73	15
Mansfield Town	2016–17	League Two	37	9	1	0	1	0	3	1	42	10
Mansfield Town	2017–18	League Two	39	14	3	3	1	0	1	0	44	17
Mansfield Town	2018–19	League Two	34	4	2	0	2	1	6	0	44	5
Mansfield Town	2019–20	League Two	31	11	1	0	1	0	1	1	34	12
Mansfield Town	2020–21	League Two	0	0	0	0	1	0	0	0	1	0
Mansfield Town	Total		141	38	7	3	6	1	11	2	165	44
Northampton Town	2020–21	League One	39	4	1	0	0	0	4	1	44	5
Northampton Town	2021–22	League Two	36	1	2	1	2	0	3	0	43	2
Northampton Town	Total		75	5	3	1	2	0	7	1	87	7
Stevenage	2022–23	League Two	43	6	3	0	1	1	3	2	52	9
Grimsby Town	2023–24	League Two	37	13	3	2	1	0	0	0	41	15
Grimsby Town	2024–25	League Two	45	14	1	0	1	0	1	1	48	15
Grimsby Town	2025–26	League Two	13	2	1	2	1	0	3	1	18	5
Grimsby Town	Total		95	29	5	4	3	0	4	2	107	35
Barrow	2025–26	League Two	21	4	0	0	0	0	0	0	21	4
Barrow	2026–27	National League	4	0	0	0	0	0	0	0	4	0
Barrow	Total		25	0	0	0	0	0	0	0	25	4
Exeter City	2026–27	League Two	4	0	0	0	0	0	1	1	5	1
Career total			469	101	26	10	13	2	29	8	539	121

== Honours ==
Stevenage

- EFL League Two runner-up: 2022–23

Individual

- Grimsby Town Player of the Year: 2023–24
