= Nathan Cameron =

English footballer

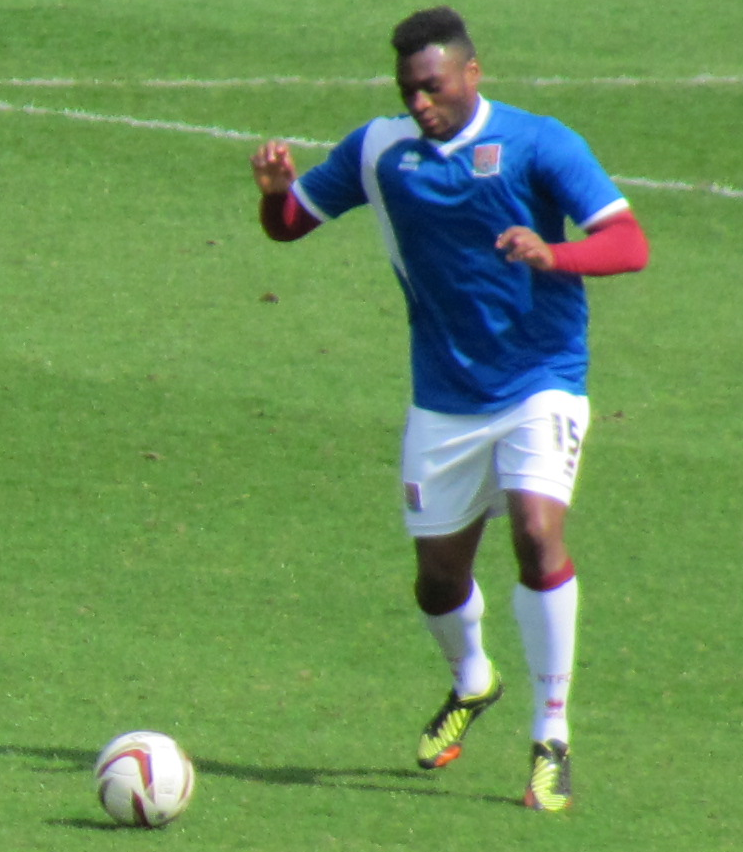
- Cameron warming up for Northampton Town in 2013

Personal information
- Full name: Nathan Benjamin Cameron
- Date of birth: 21 November 1991 (age 34)
- Place of birth: Birmingham, England
- Height: 6 ft 2 in (1.88 m)
- Position: Centre-back

Team information
- Current team: Rushall Olympic

Youth career
- –2010: Coventry City

Senior career*
Years	Team	Apps	(Gls)
2010–2013	Coventry City	48	(0)
2010	→ Nuneaton Town (loan)	13	(1)
2013	→ Northampton Town (loan)	3	(0)
2013–2018	Bury	126	(11)
2018–2020	Macclesfield Town	41	(2)
2020–2021	Wigan Athletic	2	(0)
2021	Solihull Moors	14	(1)
2021–2022	Kidderminster Harriers	30	(5)
2022	Hednesford Town	5	(0)
2023	AFC Telford United	13	(1)
2023–2024	Hereford	37	(0)
2024–	Rushall Olympic	30	(0)

International career^{‡}
2011	England U20	1	(0)
- * Club domestic league appearances and goals as of 11:03, 20 February 2025 (UTC) ‡ National team caps and goals as of 00:40, 11 August 2011 (UTC)

Nathan Benjamin Cameron (born 21 November 1991) is an English footballer who plays as a centre-back for and captains Southern League Premier Division Central club Rushall Olympic.

Having progressed through the academy system at Coventry City, Cameron has also represented Bury, and spent time on loan at Nuneaton Town in 2010 and Northampton Town in 2013. He has been capped by England at youth level, appearing once for the under-20 team.

Cameron signed for Wigan Athletic in September 2020 on a short-term contract.

== Club career ==
=== Coventry City ===
Born in Birmingham, England, Cameron started his football career at Coventry City and having progressed through the academy, Cameron signed his first professional contract with the club. While progressing through the academy, Cameron was captain for the academy both U16 and U18.

After appearing twice as unused substitute in the league in mid-August, Cameron made his Coventry City debut on 12 August 2009, where he played 15 minutes, in a 1–0 loss against Hartlepool United. After his loan spell at Nuneaton Town came to an end, Cameron signed a one–year contract with the club.

Cameron made his first league start in the opening game of the 2010–11 season, playing 90 minutes, in a 2–0 win over Portsmouth. Soon after, Cameron lost his first team place, due to Aidy Boothroyd's preferring James McPake and Richard Woods' partnership in central defence. Cameron soon given a first team chance around November following McPake and Ben Turner's injury. On 3 January 2011, Cameron then provided assist for Freddy Eastwood to score the club's only goal in the match, in a 2–1 loss against Barnsley. However, as the season progressed towards the end, Cameron soon lost his first team place, but after making 25 appearances, he expected to sign a contract with the club, keeping him until 2014. However, the contract was changed from 2014 to 2013 instead.

After appearing on the substitute bench for several matches, Cameron made his first appearance of the 2011–12 season on 19 September 2011, where he came on as a substitute in the 76th minute, in a 3–0 loss against Ipswich Town. Following a failed loan move to Northampton Town on loan, where he could re–join Boothroyd, Cameron suffered a knee injury soon after and kept him out for months. After returning to the substitute bench unused against Barnsley on 25 February 2012, Cameron made his return, where he made his starts in months, in a 1–1 draw against Crystal Palace. In a 0–0 draw against Watford on 17 March 2012, Cameron had his goal wrongly disallowed, in which could have been his first Coventry City goal; leading to an apology from the officials. However, Cameron ended the season with 14 appearances after being ruled out for the rest of the season with a knee injury and Coventry City was relegated from the Championship.

The start 2012–13 season saw Cameron continued to rehabilitated his knee injury following an operation and returned to training in early–August. Cameron made his first team return on 2 October 2012, where he came on as a substitute in the 69th minute, in a 1–1 draw against Milton Keynes Dons. Cameron then provided assist for Leon Clarke to score the first goal of the game, in a 2–0 win over Bournemouth on 26 February 2013. However, Cameron return to the first team limited his chances and he was an unused substitute for a number of games. Cameron made nine appearances for the club.

At the end of the season, Cameron was among five players to be released by the club.

=== Nuneaton Town and Northampton Town (loan) ===
On 31 March 2010, Cameron was loaned out to Nuneaton Town for the rest of the season. Cameron made his Nuneaton Town debut on 5 April 2010, in a 1–0 win over Tiverton Town. Cameron scored his first goal for the club nine days later on 14 August 2010, in a 4–0 win over Stourbridge. Cameron went on to make thirteen appearances and scoring once for Nuneaton Town.

With his first team opportunities limited at Coventry City, just on the substitute bench, Cameron joined League Two side Northampton Town on loan until the end of the season on 26 March 2013. Cameron made his Northampton Town debut three days later on 29 March 2013, coming on as a substitute for Chris Hackett in the 86th minute, in a 1–0 win over Torquay United. After making two starts in both legs against Cheltenham Town in the semi–final play–offs, which Northampton Town won 2–0 on aggregate. Cameron played the whole match of the play-off final defeat to Bradford City. Despite this, Northampton Town were keen on signing Cameron, but the move was later withdrawn.

=== Bury ===
After an unsuccessful move to Northampton Town, Cameron joined League Two relegated side Bury on 28 June 2013, signing a two–year contract. Upon joining the club, Cameron couldn't hide his delight moving to Bury, though at the same time he describe the move as 'pretty late' and was given number five shirt.

Cameron made his Bury debut, playing in the central–midfielder, in a 2–0 loss against Chesterfield in the opening game of the season. But in the next match, Cameron received a red card after a second bookable offense, in a 2–1 loss against Oxford United. Two weeks later, on 31 August 2013, Cameron scored his first Bury goal, in a 4–1 win over Cheltenham Town. Cameron added three more goals later in the season against Torquay United, Exeter City and York City. However, Cameron was soon sidelined after being dropped from the first team for two months and was expected to be loaned out as result. However, Cameron managed to stay at the club and made his first team return on 21 April 2014, coming on as a substitute in the last minute, in a 1–0 loss against York City. Despite this, he finished the 2013–14 season, making twenty–seven appearances and scoring four times.

Ahead of the 2014–15 season, Cameron was considered leaving the club, due to limited first team opportunities, but stayed at the club after regaining his first team place and switched shirt from 5 to 27. Cameron's performance soon attract interests from Championship clubs. But the transfer speculation ended when Cameron signed a three–year contract, keeping him until 2017. Cameron scored his first Bury goal of the season, in the first round of the FA Cup, with a 3–1 win over Hemel Hempstead Town on 8 November 2014. Cameron scored again in the quarter-final of Football League Trophy, in a 2–1 loss against Tranmere Rovers. Two months later, on 27 January 2015, Cameron then scored his first league goal of the season, in a 1–0 win over Accrington Stanley. Cameron went on to score two more goals later in the season, against Mansfield Town and Cambridge United. Cameron was the ever-present player in the 2014–15 season, as he appeared in every match and helped the club get promoted to League Two. In addition to his good performance to the season, Cameron was awarded for the Bury Times player of the season award.

In the 2015–16 season, Cameron was given the captaincy in the opening game of the season against Doncaster Rovers, which they drew 1–1. From that moment on, Cameron captained in handful of matches throughout the 2015–16 season. By November, Cameron scored three goals against Port Vale, Peterborough United and Wigan Athletic. Cameron continued to be in the first team at Bury until he suffered cartilage damage, in a 5–2 win over Colchester United on 20 February 2016. It was announced that Cameron would be ruled out for the rest of the season after having surgery. Cameron finished the season, making twenty-seven appearances.

Ahead of the 2016–17 season, Cameron continued to recover from his knee injury and made his Bury return on 24 July 2016, in a 1–1 draw against Southport. Cameron played a role in the opening game of the season against Charlton Athletic, where he won a penalty, leading Neil Danns convert the penalty in a 2–0 win. Weeks later, Cameron signed a contract extension, keeping him until 2018.

He was released by Bury at the end of the 2017–18 season.

Former manager David Flitcroft gave Cameron a trial at Mansfield Town in the 2018 close season, however he was injured in the friendly match with fellow East Midlands club Derby County.

On 16 November 2018, Cameron joined League Two club Macclesfield Town on a two-month deal.

=== Wigan Athletic ===
Having been on trial for a month, Cameron signed a short-term contract with Wigan Athletic on 18 September 2020.

=== Non-league ===
In January 2021, Cameron joined National League club Solihull Moors on a short-term contract. At the end of the season, he signed for National League North club Kidderminster Harriers for the following campaign.

In August 2022, Cameron joined Southern League Premier Division Central club Hednesford Town. He left the club the following month. In February 2023, he signed for National League North bottom side AFC Telford United on a short-term contract until the end of the season.

On 30 June 2023, Cameron joined National League North club Hereford, linking up with former Bury teammate Paul Caddis, and was subsequently appointed captain. He made his debut in the opening league fixture of the season. He left Hereford after just one season at the club.

On 7 August 2024, Cameron joined fellow National League North club Rushall Olympic.

== International career ==
In February 2011, Cameron was called up by England U20 and made his England U20 debut on 9 February 2011, in a 2–1 loss against France U20.

In July 2011, Cameron, along with his then teammate Jordan Clarke, were left out of the England U20 squad for the FIFA U-20 World Cup, which took place in Colombia.

== Career statistics ==
As of match played 15 February 2025

Appearances and goals by club, season and competition
Club	Season	League			FA Cup		League Cup		Other		Total	
Club	Season	Division	Apps	Goals	Apps	Goals	Apps	Goals	Apps	Goals	Apps	Goals
Coventry City	2009–10	Championship	0	0	0	0	1	0	0	0	1	0
Coventry City	2010–11	Championship	25	0	1	0	0	0	0	0	26	0
Coventry City	2011–12	Championship	14	0	0	0	0	0	0	0	14	0
Coventry City	2012–13	League One	9	0	0	0	0	0	2 (Note: Appearances in the Football League Trophy)	0	11	0
Coventry City	Total		48	0	1	0	1	0	2	0	52	0
Northampton Town (loan)	2012–13	League Two	3	0	0	0	0	0	3 (Note: Appearances in the League Two play-offs)	0	6	0
Bury	2013–14	League Two	27	4	2	0	2	0	0	0	31	4
Bury	2014–15	League Two	46	2	3	1	1	0	2	1	52	4
Bury	2015–16	League One	28	3	5	1	2	0	2	0	37	4
Bury	2016–17	League One	4	0	0	0	1	0	0	0	5	0
Bury	2017–18	League One	21	2	1	0	0	0	1	0	23	2
Bury	Total		126	11	11	2	6	0	5	1	148	14
Macclesfield Town	2018–19	League Two	25	2	0	0	0	0	0	0	25	2
Macclesfield Town	2019–20	League Two	16	0	0	0	1	0	2	0	19	0
Macclesfield Town	Total		41	2	0	0	1	0	2	0	44	2
Wigan Athletic	2020–21	League One	2	0	0	0	0	0	0	0	2	0
Solihull Moors	2020–21	National League	14	1	0	0	—		1 (Note: Appearance(s) in FA Trophy)	0	15	1
Kidderminster Harriers	2021–22	National League North	30	5	5	0	—		0	0	35	0
Hednesford Town	2022–23	SL Premier Division Central	5	0	0	0	—		—		5	0
AFC Telford United	2022–23	National League North	13	1	0	0	—		0	0	13	1
Hereford	2023–24	National League North	37	0	1	0	—		3	0	41	0
Rushall Olympic	2024–25	National League North	30	0	3	0	—		2	0	35	0
Career totals			349	20	21	2	8	0	18	1	396	18
