= 2017–18 Bury F.C. season =

Bury
2017–18 season
- Chairman: Stewart Day
- Manager: Lee Clark (until 30 October) Ryan Lowe (caretaker until 22 November); Chris Lucketti (22 November to 15 January) Ryan Lowe (caretaker to end of season)
- Stadium: Gigg Lane
- League One: 24th (relegated)
- FA Cup: First round (vs. Woking
- EFL Cup: First round (vs. Sunderland)
- EFL Trophy: Third round (vs. Fleetwood Town)
Home colours	Away colours

The 2017–18 season was Bury's third consecutive season in League One.

== Competitions ==
=== Pre-season friendlies ===
7 July 2017	Bury	2–3	Sunderland	Bury
19:30 BST	Tutte 19'; Reilly 27'	Report	Rodwell 37'; Maja 77', 86'	Stadium: Gigg Lane; Attendance: 2,110

16 July 2017	Bury	1–3	Huddersfield Town	Bury
15:00 BST	Beckford 47'	Report	Mounié 54'; Ince 64'; Kachunga 87' (pen.)	Stadium: Gigg Lane; Attendance: 3,306

18 July 2017	Macclesfield Town	1–0	Bury	Macclesfield
19:30 BST	Wilson 79'			Stadium: Moss Rose

22 July 2017	Bury	1–1	Crewe Alexandra	Bury
15:00 BST	Beckford 84'	Report	Walker 10'	Stadium: Gigg Lane; Attendance: 1,105

25 July 2017	Salford City	1–2	Bury	Salford
19:30 BST	Phenix 50'	Report	Ismail 56', 79'	Stadium: Moor Lane

1 August 2017	Radcliffe Borough	0-1	Bury XI	Radcliffe
19:30 BST		Report		Stadium: NeuVen Stadium

=== League One ===
==== League table ====
Pos	Team	Pld	W	D	L	GF	GA	GD	Pts	Promotion, qualification or relegation
20	Rochdale	46	11	18	17	49	57	−8	51	
21	Oldham Athletic (R)	46	11	17	18	58	75	−17	50	Relegation to EFL League Two
22	Northampton Town (R)	46	12	11	23	43	77	−34	47	Relegation to EFL League Two
23	Milton Keynes Dons (R)	46	11	12	23	43	69	−26	45	Relegation to EFL League Two
24	Bury (R)	46	8	12	26	41	71	−30	36	Relegation to EFL League Two

Source: BBC Sport
Rules for classification: 1) Points; 2) Goal difference; 3) Number of goals scored
(R) Relegated

==== Result summary ====
Overall								Home						Away					
Pld	W	D	L	GF	GA	GD	Pts	W	D	L	GF	GA	GD	W	D	L	GF	GA	GD
27	4	5	18	19	42	−23	17	4	1	8	10	17	−7	0	4	10	9	25	−16

Last updated: 13 January 2018.

==== Results by matchday ====
Matchday	1	2	3	4	5	6	7	8	9	10	11	12	13	14	15	16	17	18	19	20	21	22	23	24	25	26	27	28	29	30	31	32	33	34	35	36	37	38	39	40	41	42	43	44	45	46
Ground	H	A	H	A	H	A	A	H	A	H	H	H	A	A	A	H	A	H	H	A	A	A	H	H	A	A	H	A	H	H	A	H	A	H	H	H	A	H	A	H	A	H	A	A	H	A
Result	W	L	L	D	L	L	L	D	D	W	L	W	L	L	L	L	D	L	W	D	L	L	L	L	L	L	L	W	D	W	D	D	L	W	D	L	L	L	L	L	L	L	D	D	W	D
Position	9	14	19	17	18	19	22	22	21	19	20	19	21	21	21	23	24	24	24	23	24	24	24	24	24	24	24	24	24	24	24	23	23	23	24	24	24	24	24	24	24	24	24	24	24	24

Updated to match(es) played on 13 January 2018. Source:
A = Away; H = Home; W = Win; D = Draw; L = Loss

==== Matches ====
On 21 June 2017, the league fixtures were announced.

5 August 2017 1	Bury	1–0	Walsall	Bury
15:00 BST	Beckford 45+1' (yellow card) 90+4'; Lowe (yellow card) 90+2'	Report	Leahy (yellow card) 45'	Stadium: Gigg Lane; Attendance: 4,240; Referee: Mark Heywood

12 August 2017 2	Wigan Athletic	4–1	Bury	Wigan
15:00 BST	Jacobs 13'; Powell 53', 64' (pen.) (yellow card) 70'; Evans 90+2'	Report	Bruce 15' (yellow card) 73'; Reilly (yellow card) 45'; Aldred (yellow card) 47'; Murphy (yellow card) 64'	Stadium: DW Stadium; Attendance: 9,159; Referee: Oliver Langford

19 August 2017 3	Bury	2–3	Bristol Rovers	Bury
15:00 BST	Beckford 90'; Ajose 90+3'	Report	Lockyer 55'; Bodin 73', 85'	Stadium: Gigg Lane; Attendance: 3,402; Referee: Carl Boyeson

26 August 2017 4	Rochdale	0–0	Bury	Rochdale
15:00 BST	Cannon (yellow card) 43'; Done (yellow card) 65'	Report	Murphy (red card) 54'; Williams (yellow card) 90+2'	Stadium: Spotland Stadium; Attendance: 4,601; Referee: John Brooks

2 September 2017 5	Bury	0–1	Scunthorpe United	Bury
15:00 BST	Cameron (yellow card) 45+2'	Report	Wallace (yellow card) 24'; Sutton (yellow card) 82'; Morris 86' (yellow card) 88'	Stadium: Gigg Lane; Attendance: 4,055; Referee: Eddie Ilderton

9 September 2017 6	Rotherham United	3–2	Bury	Rotherham
15:00 BST	Moore 20', 54'; Towell 89'	Report	Beckford 34'; Cameron (yellow card) 51' (goal) 67'; Whitmore (yellow card) 89'	Stadium: New York Stadium; Attendance: 7,848; Referee: Chris Sarginson

12 September 2017 7	Fleetwood Town	3–2	Bury	Fleetwood
19:45 BST	Hiwula 22', 28'; Sowerby (yellow card) 36'; Hunter 66'; Burns (yellow card) 90+6'	Report	Ince (yellow card) 29'; Beckford 31' (yellow card) 90+6'; Laurent 44'	Stadium: Highbury Stadium; Attendance: 2,535; Referee: Darren England

16 September 2017 8	Bury	0–0	Plymouth Argyle	Bury
15:00 BST	Humphrey (yellow card) 23'	Report	Ness (yellow card) 89'	Stadium: Gigg Lane; Attendance: 3,642; Referee: Anthony Backhouse

23 September 2017 9	Charlton Athletic	1–1	Bury	Charlton
15:00 BST	Magennis 39'; Ngoyo (yellow card) 84'	Report	Beckford 9'; Aldred (yellow card) 12'; Laurent (yellow card) 78'	Stadium: The Valley; Attendance: 9,895; Referee: Dean Whitestone

26 September 2017 10	Bury	3–0	Oxford United	Bury
19:45 BST	Laurent (yellow card) 59'; Maguire 64' (pen.); Smith 70'; Beckford 72'; Edwards (yellow card) 76'; Dobre (yellow card) 88'	Report	Hall (yellow card) 65'	Stadium: Gigg Lane; Attendance: 2,951; Referee: Ben Toner

30 September 2017 11	Bury	0–2	Milton Keynes Dons	Bury
15:00 BST	Humphrey (yellow card) 63'; Skarz (yellow card) 90+1'	Report	Sow 6'; Nicholls (yellow card) 43'; Gilbey (yellow card) 56'; Ebanks-Landell 66'; Brittain (yellow card) 82'	Stadium: Gigg Lane; Attendance: 3,165; Referee: Michael Salisbury

7 October 2017 P	Oldham Athletic	v	Bury	Oldham
15:00 BST				Stadium: Boundary Park
Note: On 28 September, the scheduled away fixture against Oldham Athletic was postponed due to international call-ups.

14 October 2017 12	Bury	3–1	Bradford City	Bury
15:00 BST	Maguire 19' (pen.); Beckford 20'; Reilly (yellow card) 76'; Smith (yellow card) 82'; O'Shea 85'	Report	Wyke 9'; Taylor (yellow card) 90+4'	Stadium: Gigg Lane; Attendance: 5,514; Referee: David Webb

17 October 2017 13	Blackpool	2–1	Bury	Blackpool
19:45 BST	Mellor 38'; Delfouneso (yellow card) 65'; Tilt 73' (yellow card) 87'	Report	Aldred (yellow card) 13'; Beckford 58'	Stadium: Bloomfield Road; Attendance: 3,437; Referee: Anthony Backhouse

21 October 2017 14	Southend United	1–0	Bury	Southend-on-Sea
15:00 BST	Leonard 84'	Report		Stadium: Roots Hall; Attendance: 6,787; Referee: Gavin Ward

24 October 2017 15	Oldham Athletic	2–1	Bury	Oldham
19:45 BST	Doyle 24'; Byrne (yellow card) 44'; Amadi-Holloway 90+3'	Report	Aldred 47'; Ince (yellow card) 69'	Stadium: Boundary Park; Attendance: 5,183; Referee: Darren Drysdale

28 October 2017 16	Bury	0–1	Doncaster Rovers	Bury
15:00 BST	O'Connell (red card) 45+3'; Maguire (yellow card) 67'	Report	Marquis (yellow card) 36'; Whiteman 78'	Stadium: Gigg Lane; Attendance: 3,079; Referee: Andy Haines

11 November 2017 17	Gillingham	1–1	Bury	Gillingham
15:00 GMT	Ehmer (yellow card) 6'; O'Neill (yellow card) 59'; Parker 85'	Report	Ince (yellow card) 25'; Danns 39'; Edwards (yellow card) 69'; Williams (yellow card) 78'	Stadium: Priestfield Stadium; Attendance: 4,364; Referee: Charles Breakspear

18 November 2017 18	Bury	0–3	Blackburn Rovers	Bury
15:00 GMT		Report	Antonsson 12', 37'; Dack 63'	Stadium: Gigg Lane; Attendance: 7,159; Referee: Dean Whitestone

21 November 2017 19	Bury	1–0	Shrewsbury Town	Bury
19:45 GMT	Leigh 56'	Report		Stadium: Gigg Lane; Attendance: 3,055; Referee: Seb Stockbridge

25 November 2017 20	Northampton Town	0–0	Bury	Northampton
15:00 GMT		Report	Cameron (yellow card) 43'	Stadium: Sixfields Stadium; Attendance: 4,870; Referee: Carl Boyeson

16 December 2017 21	Portsmouth	1–0	Bury	Portsmouth
15:00 GMT	Bennett (yellow card) 17'; Clarke 62'; Evans (yellow card) 78'	Report	O'Connell (yellow card) 27'	Stadium: Fratton Park; Attendance: 17,549; Referee: (England) John Brooks (referee)

23 December 2017 22	Peterborough United	3–0	Bury	Peterborough
15:00 GMT	Lloyd 3' 71'; Maddison (yellow card) 48'; Marriott 63'	Report	O'Connell (yellow card) 54' (yellow-red card)	Stadium: ABAX Stadium; Attendance: 4,640; Referee: (England) Andy Woolmer

26 December 2017 23	Bury	0–3	Rotherham United	Bury
15:00 GMT	Dawson (yellow card) 8'; Laurent (yellow card) 47'	Report	Ball 5'; Frecklington 10'; Williams (yellow card) 25'; Vaulks 83'; Forde (yellow card) 90+2'	Stadium: Gigg Lane; Attendance: 4,630; Referee: (England) Anthony Backhouse

30 December 2017 24	Bury	0–2	Fleetwood Town	Bury
15:00 GMT	Dawson (yellow card) 38'	Report	Hunter 24'; Cole 47'; Dempsey (yellow card) 68'	Stadium: Gigg Lane; Attendance: 3,158; Referee: (England) Dean Whitestone

1 January 2018 25	Scunthorpe United	1–0	Bury	Scunthorpe
15:00 GMT	Ojo (yellow card) 45'; Goode 86'; Sutton (yellow card) 90+2'	Report	Reilly (yellow card) 45+3'; Bunn (yellow card) 79'; O'Connell (yellow card) 88'	Stadium: Glanford Park; Attendance: 4,270; Referee: (England) Ben Toner

6 January 2018 26	Plymouth Argyle	3–0	Bury	Plymouth
15:00 GMT	Diagouraga 14' (yellow card) 18'; Carey 42'; Fox (yellow card) 56'; Sarcevic 78'	Report	Lowe (red card) 60'; Danns (yellow card) 61'	Stadium: Home Park; Attendance: 9,139; Referee: (England) Trevor Kettle

13 January 2018 27	Bury	0–1	Charlton Athletic	Bury
15:00 GMT	Mayor (yellow card) 32'	Report	Marshall 63'; Dijksteel (yellow card) 78'; Amos (yellow card) 86'	Stadium: Gigg Lane; Attendance: 3,295; Referee: (England) Michael Salisbury

20 January 2018 28	Oxford United	1–2	Bury	Oxford
15:00 GMT	Mousinho (yellow card) 26'; Henry 45'	Report	Dawson (yellow card) 76'; Edwards (yellow card) 79'; Miller 81'; Bunn 84'	Stadium: Kassam Stadium; Attendance: 6,457 (191 away); Referee: Robert Lewis

3 February 2018 29	Bury	1–1	Blackpool	Bury
	Danns (yellow card) 53'; Cameron (yellow card) 57'; Miller 83'; Clarke (yellow card) 88'	Report	Longstaff 53'; Vassell (yellow card) 61'	Stadium: Gigg Lane; Attendance: 4,089; Referee: Jeremy Simpson

6 February 2018 30	Bury	2–1	AFC Wimbledon	Gigg Lane
19:45 GMT	Miller 17'; Bunn 43'; Edwards (yellow card) 61'; Thompson (yellow card) 74'	Report	Robinson (yellow card) 12'; Edwards 28' (o.g.); Pigott (yellow card) 60'	Attendance: 2,975; Referee: Robert Jones

10 February 2018 31	Bradford City	2–2	Bury	Bradford
15:00 GMT	McMahon (yellow card) 9'; Poleon (yellow card) 19'; Dieng 58'; Kilgallon (yellow card) 70', (red card) 79'; McCartan 89', (yellow card) 90'; Wyke (yellow card) 90+2'	Report	Mayor (yellow card) 36'; Cameron 62'; Clarke (yellow card) 86'; Miller 90+5'	Stadium: Valley Parade; Attendance: 19,476; Referee: Seb Stockbridge

13 February 2018 32	Bury	0–0	Southend United	Bury
19:45 GMT	Dawson (yellow card) 33'; Laurent (yellow card) 63'	Report		Stadium: Gigg Lane; Attendance: 2,795; Referee: Martin Coy

19 February 2018 33	Blackburn Rovers	2–0	Bury	Blackburn
19:45 GMT	Graham 51'; Armstrong 67'	Report	Cameron (yellow card) 86'	Stadium: Ewood Park; Attendance: 12,038; Referee: John Busby

24 February 2018 34	Bury	2–1	Gillingham	Bury
15:00 GMT	Danns 12'; Bunn 25'	Report	Ogilvie 69'	Stadium: Gigg Lane; Attendance: 3,004; Referee: Darren Drysdale

10 March 2018 35	Bury	2–2	Oldham Athletic	Bury
15:00 GMT	O'Shea 14'; Danns 34'; Thompson (yellow card) 86'	Report	Moimbé (yellow card) 10'; Davies 42'; Pringle 77'; Byrne (yellow card) 82'	Stadium: Gigg Lane; Attendance: 5,904; Referee: Andy Woolmer

13 March 2018 36	Bury	0–1	Peterborough United	Bury
19:45 GMT	Ince (yellow card) 26'	Report	Marriott 90+2'	Stadium: Gigg Lane; Attendance: 2,784; Referee: David Webb

17 March 2018 37	Milton Keynes Dons	2–1	Bury	Milton Keynes
15:00 GMT	Aneke 11' (pen.), 57' (pen.), (yellow card) 62'; Ebanks-Landell (yellow card) 89'	Report	Clarke (yellow card) 45'; Cameron (yellow card) 65'; Miller 76'; Dawson (yellow card) 80'	Stadium: Stadium MK; Attendance: 9,247 (277 Bury fans); Referee: Gavin Ward

24 March 2018 38	Bury	0–2	Wigan Athletic	Bury
	Maguire (yellow card) 84'	Report	Powell (yellow card) 25', (goal) 26'; Dunkley 50'	Stadium: Gigg Lane; Attendance: 5,207; Referee: Jon Moss

30 March 2018 39	Bristol Rovers	2–1	Bury	Bristol
	Clarke (yellow card) 10'; Telford 65'; Lines 85' (pen.)	Report	Laurent (yellow card) 19'; Danns 54'; Cooney (yellow card) 85'	Stadium: Memorial Stadium; Attendance: 9,030; Referee: Lee Collins

3 April 2018 40	Bury	0–2	Rochdale	Bury
19:45 BST		Report	Delaney 30'; Henderson 43'	Stadium: Gigg Lane; Attendance: 4,628; Referee: Geoff Eltringham

7 April 2018 41	Walsall	1–0	Bury	Walsall
	Thompson 89' (o.g.)	Report	Thompson (yellow card) 51'	Stadium: Bescot Stadium; Attendance: 3,807; Referee: Chris Sarginson

14 April 2018 42	Bury	2–3	Northampton Town	Bury
15:00 BST	Clarke 11'; Thompson (yellow card) 61'; Mayor 74' (yellow card) 82'	Report	Taylor 6', 88'; Hoskins 33'; O'Toole (yellow card) 75'	Stadium: Gigg Lane; Attendance: 3,117; Referee: Trevor Kettle

17 April 2018 43	Doncaster Rovers	3–3	Bury	Doncaster
19:45 BST	Butler 2'; Marquis 35'; Boyle 65'	Report	Mason 38' (o.g.); O'Shea 51' (pen.); Styles (yellow card) 58'; Miller 60'	Stadium: Keepmoat Stadium; Attendance: 7,131; Referee: Carl Boyeson

21 April 2018 44	Shrewsbury Town	1–1	Bury	Shrewsbury
15:00 BST	Eisa 13'; Gnahoua (yellow card) 90+1'	Report	Ismail (yellow card) 44'; O'Shea 66'; Edwards (yellow card) 71'	Stadium: New Meadow; Attendance: 5,735; Referee: Eddie Ilderton

28 April 2018 45	Bury	1–0	Portsmouth	Bury
15:00 BST	Miller (yellow card) 53' (goal) 67'	Report	Thompson (yellow card) 40'; Donohue (yellow card) 48'	Stadium: Gigg Lane; Attendance: 4,575; Referee: Andy Haines

5 May 2018 46	AFC Wimbledon	2–2	Bury	Kingston upon Thames
17:30 BST	Parrett 12' (yellow card) 77'; Appiah 34'	Report	Danns 66'; Miller 85'	Stadium: Kingsmeadow; Attendance: 4,770; Referee: Darren Drysdale

=== FA Cup ===
On 16 October 2017, Bury were drawn away to either Woking or Concord Rangers in the first round. Woking won the replayed match 2–1 to host the first round tie. A draw in the first round meant a replay would need to be played at Gigg Lane.

5 November 2017 First round	Woking	1–1	Bury	Woking
14:00 GMT	Philpot 25'; Ralph (yellow card) 80'	Report	Smith 1' (yellow card) 83'; Aldred (yellow card) 90+4'	Stadium: Kingfield Stadium; Attendance: 1,858; Referee: Darren England

14 November 2017 First round replay	Bury	0–3	Woking	Bury
19:45 GMT	Smith (yellow card) 55'; Cameron (yellow card) 55'; O'Connell (yellow card) 79'	Report	Charles-Cook 30'; Orlu (yellow card) 33'; Ralph (yellow card) 44'; Isaac (yellow card) 61'; Baxter (yellow card) 65'; Effiong 71'; Philpot 86'	Stadium: Gigg Lane; Referee: Ross Joyce

=== EFL Cup ===
On 16 June 2017, Bury were drawn at home to Sunderland in the first round.

10 August 2017 First round	Bury	0–1	Sunderland	Bury
19:45 BST		Report	Browning (yellow card) 45+1'; Khazri (yellow card) 62'; Honeyman 69'	Stadium: Gigg Lane; Attendance: 3,470; Referee: Robert Jones

=== EFL Trophy ===
On 12 July 2017, the group stage draw was completed with Bury facing Blackburn Rovers, Rochdale and Stoke City U23s in Northern Group C. After finished second in their group and advancing to the next round, Bury were drawn away to Walsall. A home tie in the third round was confirmed next against Fleetwood Town.

Pos	Lge	Team	Pld	W	PW	PL	L	GF	GA	GD	Pts	Qualification
1	L1	Rochdale (Q)	3	1	1	1	0	5	1	+4	6	Round 2
2	L1	Bury (Q)	3	2	0	0	1	4	5	−1	6	Round 2
3	L1	Blackburn Rovers (E)	3	1	0	1	1	2	2	0	4	
4	ACA	Stoke City U21 (E)	3	0	1	0	2	1	4	−3	2	

Updated to match(es) played on 8 November 2017. Source: EFL.com
(E) Eliminated; (Q) Qualified to the phase indicated

19 September 2017 Group Game 1	Bury	0–4	Rochdale	Bury
19:45 BST	Danns (yellow card) 6'; Shotton (yellow card) 60'	Report	Bunney 12'; Inman 18', 34'; Henderson 51'; Rafferty (yellow card) 62'	Stadium: Gigg Lane; Attendance: 1,451; Referee: Mark Heywood

3 October 2017 Group Game 2	Blackburn Rovers	0–1	Bury	Blackburn
19:45 BST	Platt (yellow card) 64'; Hart (yellow card) 86'	Report	Skarz (yellow card) 40'; Williams (yellow card) 64'; Bunn 77'	Stadium: Ewood Park; Attendance: 2,025; Referee: Scott Oldham

8 November 2017 Group Game 3	Bury	3–1	Stoke City U21s	Bury
19:45 GMT	Ajose 5'; Leigh 18'; Reilly 19'	Report	Afellay 75'	Stadium: Gigg Lane; Attendance: 686; Referee: Graham Salisbury

2 December 2017 Second round	Walsall	1–2	Bury	Bescot
12:30 GMT	Oztumer 45+1'	Report	Ajose 7', 65'; Cameron (yellow card) 43'; O'Connell (yellow card) 79'	Stadium: Bescot Stadium; Attendance: 1,065; Referee: Michael Salisbury

9 January 2018 Third round	Bury	2-3	Fleetwood Town	Bury
19:30 GMT	Bunn 45+4'; Dai Wai-tsun 55'	Report	Hiwula 14' 50'; Grant 17' (pen.); Cargill (yellow card) 59'	Stadium: Gigg Lane; Attendance: 698; Referee: (England) Seb Stockbridge

== Transfers ==
=== Transfers in ===
Date from	Position	Nationality	Name	From	Fee	Ref.
1 July 2017	CF	(Jamaica)	Jermaine Beckford	Preston North End	Free	
1 July 2017	CM	(Republic of Ireland)	Stephen Dawson	Scunthorpe United	Free	
1 July 2017	RB	(England)	Phil Edwards	Burton Albion	Free	
1 July 2017	RM	(Jamaica)	Chris Humphrey	Hibernian	Free	
1 July 2017	GK	(Republic of Ireland)	Joe Murphy	Huddersfield Town	Free	
1 July 2017	CB	(Republic of Ireland)	Eoghan O'Connell	Celtic	Free	
1 July 2017	AM	(Republic of Ireland)	Jay O'Shea	Chesterfield	Free	
1 July 2017	CM	(Republic of Ireland)	Callum Reilly	Burton Albion	Free	
1 July 2017	LB	(England)	Joe Skarz	Oxford United	Free	
1 July 2017	CB	(Northern Ireland)	Adam Thompson	Southend United	Free	
6 July 2017	CB	(Scotland)	Tom Aldred	Blackpool	Free	
20 July 2017	RW	(Scotland)	Chris Maguire	Oxford United	Free	
31 July 2017	FW	(England)	Chris Sang	Wigan Athletic	Free	
4 August 2017	LW	(England)	Harry Bunn	Huddersfield Town	Undisclosed	
10 August 2017	GK	(Italy)	Leo Fasan	Celtic	Free	
31 August 2017	CF	(England)	Michael Smith	Portsmouth	Free	

=== Transfers out ===
Date from	Position	Nationality	Name	To	Fee	Ref.
1 July 2017	CB	(England)	Leon Barnett	Northampton Town	Free	
1 July 2017	CF	(England)	Chris Brown	Free agent	Released	
1 July 2017	CB	(England)	Reece Brown	Rochdale	Released	(Note: Reece Brown joined Rochdale following his release.)
1 July 2017	CF	(England)	Anthony Dudley	Salford City	Released	(Note: Anthony Dudley joined Salford City following his release.)
1 July 2017	DM	(Nigeria)	Kelvin Etuhu	Carlisle United	Released	(Note: Kelvin Etuhu joined Carlisle United following his release.)
1 July 2017	CF	(England)	Hallam Hope	Carlisle United	Released	(Note: Hallam Hope joined Carlisle United following his release.)
1 July 2017	CB	(England)	Antony Kay	Port Vale	Free	
1 July 2017	GK	(England)	Rob Lainton	Port Vale	Released	(Note: Rob Lainton joined Port Vale following his release.)
1 July 2017	RW	(Wales)	Jack Mackreth	Wrexham	Undisclosed	
1 July 2017	RB	(England)	Niall Maher	Free agent	Released	
1 July 2017	CM	(England)	Jacob Mellis	Mansfield Town	Released	(Note: Jacob Mellis joined Mansfield Town following his release.)
1 July 2017	CF	(England)	Ishmael Miller	Free agent	Released	
1 July 2017	RW	(England)	Jermaine Pennant	Free agent	Released	
1 July 2017	CF	(England)	Tom Pope	Port Vale	Free	
1 July 2017	GK	(United States)	Paul Rachubka	Free agent	Released	
1 July 2017	GK	(England)	Ben Williams	Blackpool	Mutual consent	(Note: Ben Williams joined Blackpool following his departure.)
3 July 2017	MF	(England)	Will Ferry	Southampton	Undisclosed	
13 July 2017	CF	(England)	James Vaughan	Sunderland	Undisclosed	
14 July 2017	ST	(England)	George Miller	Middlesbrough	Undisclosed	
20 July 2017	RB	(Scotland)	Paul Caddis	Blackburn Rovers	Free	
30 August 2017	CB	(Northern Ireland)	Alex Bruce	Wigan Athletic	Mutual consent	(Note: Alex Bruce joined Wigan Athletic following his departure.)

=== Loans in ===
Start date	Position	Nationality	Name	From	End date	Ref.
10 July 2017	CF	(England)	Tom Heardman	Newcastle United	30 June 2018	
14 July 2017	CF	(England)	Nicky Ajose	Charlton Athletic	30 June 2018	
31 July 2017	CB	(England)	Alex Whitmore	Burnley	4 January 2018	
25 August 2017	DM	(England)	Rohan Ince	Brighton & Hove Albion	31 May 2018	
25 August 2017	CB	(England)	Jordan Williams	Huddersfield Town	31 May 2018	
30 August 2017	RM	(Romania)	Alex Dobre	AFC Bournemouth	1 January 2018	
31 August 2017	AM	(England)	Josh Laurent	Wigan Athletic	30 June 2018	
4 January 2018	GK	(England)	Connor Ripley	Middlesbrough	30 June 2018	

=== Loans out ===
Start date	Position	Nationality	Name	To	End date	Ref.
4 July 2017	CM	(England)	Scott Burgess	Macclesfield Town	28 April 2018	
25 August 2017	FW	(England)	Chris Sang	Southport	2 January 2018	
30 August 2017	CB	(Northern Ireland)	Adam Thompson	Bradford City	30 June 2018	
31 August 2017	RM	(England)	Zeli Ismail	Walsall	30 June 2018	
