= Tom Soares =

English footballer (born 1986)

Personal information
- Full name: Thomas James Soares
- Date of birth: 10 July 1986 (age 40)
- Place of birth: Reading, England
- Height: 6 ft 0 in (1.83 m)
- Position: Midfielder

Youth career
- 2000–2003: Crystal Palace

Senior career*
Years	Team	Apps	(Gls)
2003–2008	Crystal Palace	149	(11)
2008–2012	Stoke City	7	(0)
2009	→ Charlton Athletic (loan)	11	(1)
2009–2010	→ Sheffield Wednesday (loan)	25	(2)
2012	→ Hibernian (loan)	10	(2)
2012–2017	Bury	164	(22)
2017–2019	AFC Wimbledon	69	(1)
2019–2020	Stevenage	15	(0)
2021–2022	Dorchester Town	25	(1)
2023–2024	Marlow	19	(2)

International career
2005–2007	England U21	4	(0)
- * Club domestic league appearances and goals as of 15:02, 21 April 2025 (UTC)

Thomas James Soares (born 10 July 1986) is an English professional footballer who plays as a midfielder. He has previously played for Crystal Palace, Stoke City, Bury, AFC Wimbledon and Stevenage.

== Career ==
=== Crystal Palace ===
Born in Reading, Berkshire, Soares came up through the Crystal Palace academy, playing in central midfield. When he made the Palace first team he was used as a winger. Under the management of Neil Warnock, however, Soares was played in central midfield. His driving runs, combined with his best goalscoring season to date, meant that he was a key performer in the 2007–08 season for Palace.

=== Stoke City ===
In August 2008 Soares joined Premier League newcomers Stoke City for a fee of £1.25 million. He made an impressive start, as in his second match for Stoke he won two penalty kicks in a 2–1 win against Tottenham Hotspur at the Britannia Stadium. Soares played a few more matches for Stoke, against Sunderland, Manchester City, Portsmouth and West Bromwich Albion. After playing against Hartlepool United in the FA Cup, however, Soares failed to make a league appearance. He was loaned out to Charlton Athletic for the remainder of the 2008–09 season, but failed to help keep them in the Championship. Soares scored one goal for Charlton, on 3 February against Bristol City.

Back at Stoke, he failed to make a Premier League appearance in the 2009–10 season. On 26 November 2009 Soares joined Sheffield Wednesday, initially on a month-long loan deal, but he remained there until the end of the season. As with Charlton, Soares was part of a team who were relegated from the Championship. His misery was compounded by it coming at the hands of former club Crystal Palace, who stayed up at Wednesday's expense. Soares had now been relegated three times in his short career. In March 2011, Soares played for Stoke for the first time in almost 18 months, against Cardiff City in the FA Cup. Soares again failed to make a single Premier League appearance for Stoke during the 2010–11 and 2011–12 seasons. His last league appearance for Stoke was in December 2008.

On 23 January 2012, Soares joined Scottish Premier League club Hibernian on loan until the end of the 2011–12 season. He scored two goals in a 3–1 win against Kilmarnock on 25 February.

He was released by Stoke at the end of the 2011–12 season.

On 16 August 2012, it was reported by The News that Soares was training with Portsmouth.

=== Bury ===
On 9 November 2012, Soares joined Bury on non-contract terms. He re-signed for Bury on a two-year deal on 2 July 2013. Soares scored the winning goal against Tranmere Rovers on the last day of the 2014–15 season that gained Bury 3rd place and automatic promotion to League One.

=== AFC Wimbledon ===
On 31 January 2017, Soares left Bury and signed for fellow League One side AFC Wimbledon. He scored his first goal for the club on 1 January 2018 against Southend United.

=== Stevenage ===
After spending the pre-season with Stevenage FC he officially signed for the club on 2 August 2019.

In July 2021, Soares joined Southern Football League side Dorchester Town, where he went on to make 25 league appearances.

== Personal life ==
His brother Louie is also a footballer, who has represented Barbados.

== Career statistics ==
As of match played 4 February 2023

Appearances and goals by club, season and competition
Club	Season	League			FA Cup		League Cup		Other^{[A]}		Total	
Club	Season	Division	Apps	Goals	Apps	Goals	Apps	Goals	Apps	Goals	Apps	Goals
Crystal Palace	2003–04	First Division	3	0	0	0	0	0	0	0	3	0
Crystal Palace	2004–05	Premier League	22	0	1	0	3	1	0	0	26	1
Crystal Palace	2005–06	Championship	44	1	1	0	2	0	2	0	49	1
Crystal Palace	2006–07	Championship	37	3	0	0	0	0	0	0	37	3
Crystal Palace	2007–08	Championship	39	6	1	0	0	0	2	0	42	6
Crystal Palace	2008–09	Championship	4	1	1	0	0	0	0	0	5	1
Crystal Palace	Total		149	11	4	0	5	1	4	0	162	12
Stoke City	2008–09	Premier League	7	0	1	0	0	0	―		8	0
Stoke City	2009–10	Premier League	0	0	0	0	3	0	―		3	0
Stoke City	2010–11	Premier League	0	0	1	0	0	0	―		1	0
Stoke City	2011–12	Premier League	0	0	0	0	0	0	1	0	1	0
Stoke City	Total		7	0	2	0	3	0	1	0	13	0
Charlton Athletic (loan)	2008–09	Championship	11	1	0	0	0	0	0	0	11	1
Sheffield Wednesday (loan)	2009–10	Championship	25	2	1	0	―		0	0	26	2
Hibernian (loan)	2011–12	Scottish Premier League	10	2	3	0	0	0	0	0	13	2
Bury	2012–13	League One	23	2	1	0	0	0	0	0	24	2
Bury	2013–14	League Two	30	6	2	0	1	0	0	0	33	6
Bury	2014–15	League Two	43	8	2	0	1	0	2	0	48	8
Bury	2015–16	League One	42	4	5	0	1	0	2	0	50	4
Bury	2016–17	League One	26	2	2	0	1	0	3	0	32	2
Bury	Total		164	22	12	0	4	0	7	0	187	22
AFC Wimbledon	2016–17	League One	15	0	0	0	0	0	0	0	15	0
AFC Wimbledon	2017–18	League One	31	1	3	0	0	0	1	0	35	1
AFC Wimbledon	2018–19	League One	23	0	3	0	1	0	2	1	29	1
AFC Wimbledon	Total		69	1	6	0	1	0	3	1	79	2
Stevenage	2019–20	League Two	15	0	1	0	1	0	3	0	20	0
Dorchester Town	2021–22	Southern League Premier Division South	25	1	1	0	―		1	0	27	1
Marlow	2022–23	Isthmian League South Central Division	9	1	―		―		1	0	10	1
Marlow	2023–24	Isthmian League South Central Division	10	1	3	0	―		2	0	15	1
Marlow	Total		19	2	3	0	―		3	0	25	2
Career total			494	42	33	0	14	1	22	1	563	44

A. The "Other" column constitutes appearances and goals in the English Football League play-offs, UEFA Europa League, EFL Trophy, FA Trophy, Berks & Bucks Senior Cup and Isthmian League Cup
