= Pablo Mills =

English footballer

Personal information
- Full name: Pablo Simeon Ishmael Mills
- Date of birth: 27 May 1984 (age 42)
- Place of birth: Birmingham, England
- Height: 5 ft 11 in (1.80 m)
- Positions: Defender; midfielder

Youth career
- 1998–2002: Derby County

Senior career*
Years	Team	Apps	(Gls)
2002–2006	Derby County	57	(0)
2005–2006	→ Milton Keynes Dons (loan)	16	(1)
2006	→ Walsall (loan)	14	(0)
2006–2010	Rotherham United	138	(3)
2007	→ Crawley Town (loan)	14	(1)
2010–2012	Crawley Town	53	(5)
2012–2013	Macclesfield Town	30	(3)
2013–2014	Rotherham United	10	(0)
2014–2015	Bury	39	(0)
2015	→ Cheltenham Town (loan)	8	(0)
2015	Brackley Town	2	(1)
2016–2023	Mickleover Sports		
Total		381+	(14+)

International career
2001	England U16	1	(0)
2002	England U18	1	(0)
2002–2003	England U19	4	(0)
- * Club domestic league appearances and goals as of 23:03, 13 July 2015 (UTC)

Pablo Simeon Ishmael Mills (born 27 May 1984) is an English former footballer. He predominantly played as a midfielder or defender.

== Club career ==
Mills joined Derby County as a 14-year-old, turning professional at 18. In the early stages of his career he played at full back for Derby. Mills went on to appear in 64 first team games in league and cup for the Rams and during this time had loan spells at Milton Keynes Dons and Walsall. Whilst at MK Dons he scored twice; once in the league against Swansea City and once in the Football League Trophy against Colchester United. He joined Rotherham United during the summer of 2006, adding strength to the centre of defence.

Mills allegedly returned to training for the 2007–08 season three stone overweight and was loaned out to Crawley Town of the Conference National on 24 August 2007 to regain his fitness. His loan was extended until the end of October, and he scored one goal for Crawley mainly playing in the centre of midfield.

Mills returned to the Rotherham squad after his loan spell ended and signed a new two-year deal at Millmoor in May 2008. Mills was also appointed club captain by manager Mark Robins, for the 2008–09 campaign. In a match against Brentford on 9 March 2009, Mills was involved in a challenge with Nathan Elder which left Elder suffered a double fracture of the cheekbone and a fractured eye socket and was out for the rest of the season. Manager of Brentford Andy Scott was very unhappy with the challenge and wanted the FA to take action. Mills says he was sick after the challenge and insisted there was no malice in the challenge. But Mills will not be charged by the FA and has been cleared of any wrongdoing.

Mills was released by Rotherham after the League Two Play-off Final defeat at Wembley in May 2010. He re-signed for Crawley on 6 July. He was named Man of the Match in Crawley's FA Cup fifth round loss to Manchester United at Old Trafford, on 19 February 2011. He was named in the Conference Team of the Year for the 2010–11 season after Crawley won the title and were promoted to League Two.

Mills was released by Crawley on 8 May 2012. Mills described his release as 'amicable' and wished the club well for the future. Mills was linked with his former club Rotherham United.

In July 2012, Mills was linked with French Ligue 2 side Boulogne after the club invited Mills for negotiations. However, Mills rejected a chance to move to France after deciding to stay in the UK for family reasons. In August 2012, Mills joined conference side Macclesfield Town.

Mills joined Rotherham United on 30 August 2013 after a successful trial with the club.

On 3 January 2014, Mills signed for Bury after being released by Rotherham United.

After his release by Bury, Mills signed for Conference North side Brackley Town on 4 August 2015.

On 8 August 2016, Mills signed for Northern Premier League side Mickleover Sports

=== Brawl incident ===
On 27 March 2012, Mills was involved in a post-match fight against Bradford City and was shown a red card along with four other players (one Crawley and three Bradford). As a result, he was given a three match ban as well as being stripped of his captaincy and fined two weeks' wages. Both Mills and Claude Davis (one of the players involved in the fight) wrote a letter of apology and said:

"May I offer my most sincere apologises for my inappropriate and unprofessional behaviour at the end of our match with Bradford City on Tuesday evening.

My actions were wholly unacceptable and inexcusable and it is something I deeply regret. I have been hurting since Tuesday when in reality I should have been proud of another great victory, I am deeply ashamed of what happened.

My behaviour at Bradford City was not only out of character but totally unacceptable. I am ashamed of my conduct and I would like to place on record my apologies to everyone at Crawley Town Football Club and especially our supporters who should never have had to watch such actions from a player at their club.

I would also like to offer my sincerest apologies to my family who watched me behave in such a way.

I accept I will be disciplined by the football club and the Football Association and I can only trust that my previous excellent disciplinary record is taken into consideration. I am proud to be a player at Crawley Town Football CLub and can assure everyone that no such offence will ever happen again."

— Mills statement

== International career ==
Mills has represented his country at youth level, winning caps for the England under 16, under-18, and under-19 teams.

== Personal life ==
On 7 September 2006, Mills was charged with burglary and causing criminal damage at a property in Derby on 1 July 2006. Appearing at Southern Derbyshire Magistrates' Court in Derby, Mills entered no plea and was remanded on conditional bail. The case was adjourned and heard at Derby Crown Court on 30 November 2006. His club, Rotherham United gave full backing to the player. The burglary charge was later dropped, but Mills pleaded guilty to causing criminal damage, and was handed a community order for the offence.
