= 2014 Football League Two play-off final =

English association football match in 2014

- The match took place at Wembley Stadium.
- Event: 2013–14 Football League Two
| Burton Albion | Fleetwood Town |
| 0 | 1 |
- Date: 26 May 2014
- Venue: Wembley Stadium, London
- Referee: Michael Naylor
- Attendance: 14,007

The 2014 Football League Two play-off final was an association football match played on 26 May 2014 at Wembley Stadium, London, between Burton Albion and Fleetwood Town. The match determined the fourth and final team to gain promotion from Football League Two, English football's fourth tier, to Football League One. The top three teams of the 2013–14 Football League Two season gained automatic promotion to League One, while the teams placed from fourth to seventh in the table took part in play-off semi-finals; the winners of these semi-finals competed for the final place for the 2014–15 season in League One. Fleetwood Town finished in fourth place while Burton Albion ended the season in sixth position. Southend United and York City were the losing semi-finalists, being defeated by Burton and Fleetwood respectively.

The final was played in front of 14,007 spectators and was refereed by Michael Naylor. After a goalless first half, the deadlock was broken in the 75th minute after an error from Burton's goalkeeper Dean Lyness who failed to stop Antoni Sarcevic's long-range free kick. The match ended 1–0 to Fleetwood, who were promoted to the third tier of English football for the first time in their history.

Fleetwood ended their following season in tenth position in League One, six points below the play-offs. Burton finished the next season as champions of League Two, five points ahead of second-placed Shrewsbury Town, and were promoted to League One for the 2015–16 season.

== Route to the final ==
Football League Two final table, leading positions
| Pos | Team | Pld | W | D | L | GF | GA | GD | Pts |
|---|---|---|---|---|---|---|---|---|---|
| 1 | Chesterfield | 46 | 23 | 15 | 8 | 71 | 40 | +31 | 84 |
| 2 | Scunthorpe United | 46 | 20 | 21 | 5 | 68 | 44 | +24 | 81 |
| 3 | Rochdale | 46 | 24 | 9 | 13 | 69 | 48 | +21 | 81 |
| 4 | Fleetwood Town | 46 | 22 | 10 | 14 | 66 | 52 | +14 | 76 |
| 5 | Southend United | 46 | 19 | 15 | 12 | 56 | 39 | +17 | 72 |
| 6 | Burton Albion | 46 | 19 | 15 | 12 | 47 | 42 | +5 | 72 |
| 7 | York City | 46 | 18 | 17 | 11 | 52 | 41 | +11 | 71 |

Fleetwood Town finished the regular 2013–14 season in fourth place in Football League Two, the fourth tier of the English football league system, two places ahead of Burton Albion. Both therefore missed out on the three automatic places for promotion to Football League One and instead took part in the play-offs to determine the fourth promoted team. Fleetwood Town finished five points behind Rochdale and Scunthorpe United (who were promoted in third and second place respectively), and eight behind league winners Chesterfield. Burton Albion ended the season two places and four points behind Fleetwood.

Burton's opponents for their play-off semi-final were Southend United with the first match of the two-legged tie being held at the Pirelli Stadium in Burton upon Trent on 11 May 2014. Adam McGurk put the home side ahead just before half-time as he lobbed the Southend goalkeeper Dan Bentley. On the hour mark, Ian Sharps was dismissed after being shown a second yellow card, forcing Burton to play the last 30 minutes with ten men. Despite late chances for the visitors, Burton held on for a 1–0 victory. The second leg of the play-off semi-final was held at Roots Hall in Southend six days later. Midway through the first half, Burton extended their aggregate lead when Marcus Holness scored with a header from a Chris Hussey free kick. Ryan Leonard then reduced the deficit with an overhead kick before Anthony Straker's headed goal made it 2–1 to Southend at half-time. McGurk scored from a Hussey free kick midway through the second half to make it 2–2 on the day, with Burton progressing to the final with a 3–2 aggregate victory.

Fleetwood faced York City in the other play-off semi-final, with the first leg taking place at Bootham Crescent in York on 12 May 2014, having been delayed by a day because of a waterlogged pitch. The first half was short on chances and ended goalless. Five minutes after half-time Matty Blair put Fleetwood ahead from close range after Antoni Sarcevic had seen his shot blocked on the line. Iain Hume missed a chance to double the lead and the match ended 1–0 to the visitors. The second leg of the play-off semi-final took place at Highbury Stadium in Fleetwood four days later. The home goalkeeper Chris Maxwell made saves from both Michael Coulson and Keith Lowe while Nick Pope, his opposite number, denied Sarcevic. The match ended goalless and Fleetwood qualified for the final, winning 1–0 on aggregate.

== Match ==
=== Background ===
Of the finalists, only Burton had participated in the play-offs prior to 2014 when they took part in them the previous season. There, they had been knocked out at the semi-final stage by Bradford City 5–4 on aggregate. Fleetwood's last visit to Wembley was for the 1985 FA Vase Final which they lost against Halesowen Town while Burton had featured at the national stadium in the 1987 FA Trophy Final which ended in a 0–0 draw with Kidderminster Harriers. Both teams were aiming for promotion to the third tier of English football for the first time in either club's histories. Burton had played in the fourth tier since they gained promotion from the Football Conference in the 2008–09 season. Fleetwood were promoted to League Two after winning the Football Conference in the 2011–12 season.

The play-off final was the fifth meeting between the clubs during the season. In the two league matches, both sides won their away games, with Burton winning 3–2 at the Highbury Stadium in August 2013 and Fleetwood securing a 4–2 victory at the Pirelli Stadium the following January. The teams were also drawn against one another in the second round of the 2013–14 FA Cup: the tie, played in Fleetwood in December 2013, was a 1–1, with Burton winning the replay 1–0 ten days later. Fleetwood's top scorer during the regular season was Sarcevic who had scored thirteen goals, all in the league. Billy Kee was the leading scorer for Burton, with fourteen goals (twelve in the league and two in the FA Cup).

Kee's wife was in labour during the game and Kee himself said that should he score during the final, that "Wembley" would form part of the baby's name. Fleetwood went into the match as slight favourites, according to bookmakers. Burton, who wore yellow and black kit, adopted a 4–4–2 formation while Fleetwood, in red and white, played as a 4–4–2 diamond. The referee for the game was Michael Naylor.

=== Summary ===
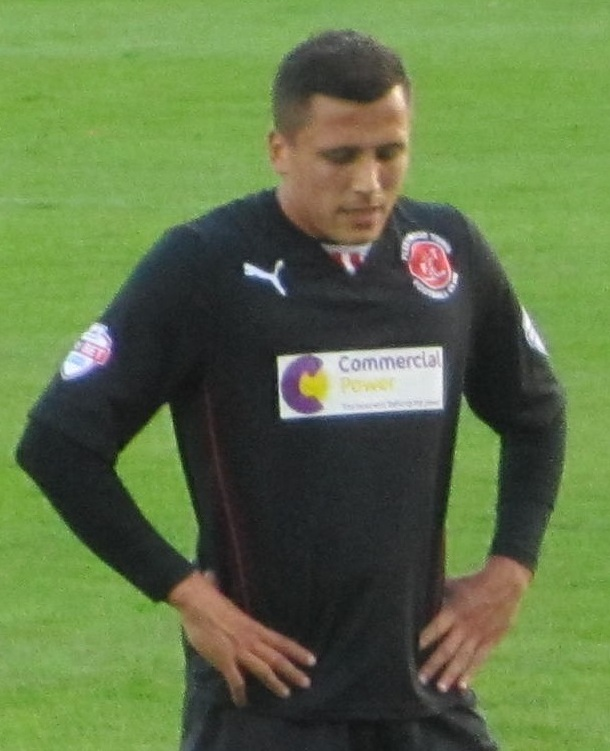
Antoni Sarcevic (pictured in 2013) scored the only goal of the game.

Burton kicked off the match in front of 14,007 spectators at around 3 p.m. on 26 May 2014. Within a minute, a high free kick from McGurk found Kee in the Fleetwood penalty area but his header was saved by Maxwell. David Ball's shot was then kept out by Dean Lyness who made a clearance from the subsequent corner. In the 11th minute, Kees was fouled by Mark Roberts but Alex MacDonald's low free-kick was cleared. Nathan Pond then sent a header over the Burton crossbar from a Fleetwood corner. Two penalty appeals were turned down by the referee in the 16th minute when both Blair and Ball fell under challenge in the Burton area. Three minutes later, a curling shot from McGurk went high and wide of the Fleetwood goal, before his shot from around 25 yards (23 m) went wide of the post. Robbie Weir then struck the ball straight at Maxwell who gathered it. On 29 minutes, Roberts passed to Ball whose shot was off-target. With three minutes of the half remaining, Sarcevic was fouled but the subsequent free kick was cleared by the Burton defence. The referee brought the half to a close with the score 0–0.

Neither side made any changes to their personnel during the half-time break and the second half was kicked off by Fleetwood. A minute in, a header from Hume fell to Ball whose attempted chip was caught by Lyness. In the 54th minute, Kee passed to Lee Bell whose low shot was caught in the Fleetwood goal by Maxwell. Hussey's shot two minutes later failed to trouble Maxwell before Sarcevic's shot went wide of the Burton goal. In the 64th minute, Burton made the first substitution of the game with Zander Diamond coming on to replace Holness who appeared to be suffering from a hamstring injury. In the 70th minute MacDonald's strike from 30 yards (27 m) took a deflection before going out for a corner which Shane Cansdell-Sherriff narrowly missed with a header. Three minutes later, Burton made their second change of the game, with Zeli Ismail coming on to replace MacDonald. Jon Parkin then replaced Blair in Fleetwood's first substitution of the afternoon. With fifteen minutes of the game remaining, Fleetwood took the lead: Lyness came out to punch clear Sarcevic's 35-yard (32 m) free kick but the ball flew over the goalkeeper and into the Burton goal. In the 78th minute, Burton made their final substitution of the game with Matt Palmer coming on for Bell. Despite late pressure from Burton, they failed to score and the match ended 1–0 to Fleetwood.

=== Details ===
26 May 2014
15:00 BST

| Burton Albion | 0–1 | Fleetwood Town |
|---|---|---|
| | BBC Report | Sarcevic 75' |

Wembley Stadium, London
Attendance: 14,007
Referee: Michael Naylor

| Burton Albion | Fleetwood Town |

| GK | 16 | Dean Lyness |
| RB | 2 | Phil Edwards | (yellow card) 75' |
| CB | 21 | Marcus Holness | | (substituted off) 65' |
| CB | 25 | Shane Cansdell-Sherriff |
| LB | 3 | Chris Hussey |
| RM | 11 | Alex MacDonald | | (substituted off) 73' |
| CM | 7 | Lee Bell | | (substituted off) 78' |
| CM | 8 | Robbie Weir |
| LM | 15 | Callum McFadzean |
| CF | 20 | Adam McGurk |
| CF | 29 | Billy Kee |
Substitutes:
| GK | 30 | Freddy Hall |
| DF | 5 | Zander Diamond | | (substituted on) 65' |
| DF | 26 | David Gray |
| MF | 19 | Zeli Ismail | | (substituted on) 73' |
| MF | 23 | Matt Palmer | | (substituted on) 78' |
| FW | 9 | Gary Alexander |
| FW | 18 | Dominic Knowles |
Manager:
Gary Rowett

| GK | 28 | Chris Maxwell |
| RB | 15 | Conor McLaughlin |
| CB | 5 | Mark Roberts |
| CB | 6 | Nathan Pond |
| LB | 20 | Charlie Taylor |
| DM | 13 | Alan Goodall |
| CM | 17 | Matty Blair | (substituted off) 74' |
| CM | 24 | Josh Morris |
| AM | 18 | Antoni Sarcevic |
| CF | 23 | David Ball |
| CF | 36 | Iain Hume | (substituted off) 86' |
Substitutes:
| GK | 33 | David Lucas |
| DF | 25 | Stephen Jordan |
| MF | 4 | Stewart Murdoch | (substituted on) 86' |
| MF | 7 | Gareth Evans |
| MF | 8 | Steven Schumacher |
| FW | 9 | Jon Parkin | (substituted on) 74' |
| FW | 10 | Jamille Matt |
Manager:
Graham Alexander

Statistics
| | Burton Albion | Fleetwood Town |
|---|---|---|
| Total shots | 19 | 16 |
| Shots on target | 2 | 4 |
| Ball possession | 49% | 51% |
| Corner kicks | 8 | 8 |
| Fouls committed | 8 | 13 |
| Yellow cards | 1 | 0 |
| Red cards | 0 | 0 |

== Post-match ==
The Fleetwood manager Graham Alexander said "I'm just pleased for my players. They have worked so hard. I'm chuffed to bits. The whole club deserves this". His opposite number Gary Rowett noted that "I wanted the players to watch Fleetwood pick up the trophy so they felt the hurt. We now have two choices: sit and sulk or use it positively ... One or two players just felt the occasion too much."

Fleetwood ended their following season in tenth position in League One, six points below the play-offs. Burton finished the next season as champions of League Two, five points ahead of second-placed Shrewsbury Town, and were promoted to League One for the 2015–16 season.
