= Damien McCrory =

Irish footballer (born 1990)

Personal information
- Full name: Damien Paul McCrory
- Date of birth: 23 February 1990 (age 36)
- Place of birth: Limerick, Ireland
- Height: 1.88 m (6 ft 2 in)
- Positions: Wingback; winger

Team information
- Current team: Leicester St Andrews

Youth career
- 2006–2008: Plymouth Argyle

Senior career*
Years	Team	Apps	(Gls)
2008–2010	Plymouth Argyle	0	(0)
2008–2009	→ Port Vale (loan)	12	(0)
2009	→ Port Vale (loan)	5	(0)
2009–2010	→ Grimsby Town (loan)	10	(0)
2010–2012	Dagenham & Redbridge	76	(1)
2012–2019	Burton Albion	196	(10)
2017–2018	→ Portsmouth (loan)	3	(0)
2019–2021	Notts County	28	(1)
2021–2022	Nuneaton Borough	23	(2)
2022–2023	Grantham Town	29	(1)
2025–	Leicester St Andrews	8	(0)
Total		390	(15)

International career
2008	Republic of Ireland U18	2	(0)
2009	Republic of Ireland U19	9	(0)
- * Club domestic league appearances and goals

Damien Paul McCrory (born 23 February 1990) is an Irish professional footballer who plays as a defender for Midland League Division One side Leicester St Andrews. He made 442 appearances in all competitions during a 15-year career.

First signing professional forms with Plymouth Argyle in 2008, he spent the next two years on loan at Port Vale and Grimsby Town, before joining Dagenham & Redbridge in 2010. He played for the "Daggers" in their victory in the 2010 League Two play-off final. He also won international caps for his country at under-18 and under-19 levels. In June 2012, he signed a two-year deal with Burton Albion. He helped Burton to the League Two title in 2014–15 and then to promotion out of League One in 2015–16. He joined Portsmouth on loan in August 2017. After his seven-year spell at Burton ended, he moved on to Notts County in August 2019. After two seasons with Notts County, he moved on to Nuneaton Borough before joining Grantham Town in July 2022. He won the Lincolnshire Senior Cup with Grantham in 2023. He came out of retirement to play for Leicester St Andrews in 2025.

== Club career ==
=== Plymouth Argyle ===
Having been signed to Plymouth Argyle's Centre of Excellence in August 2006, McCrory rose through the ranks to earn a twelve-month professional contract with the club in May 2008. He started the 2008–09 season positively by joining the first-team squad in Austria on their annual tour, scoring in one of the games against SpVgg Greuther Fürth. He was given shirt number 29 for his first professional season. McCrory joined League Two side Port Vale on loan in October 2008, looking to gain some league experience. He made his league debut against Shrewsbury Town on 11 October, replacing Paul Edwards on 54 minutes as Vale went on to win 2–1. He fitted into the side well, and Vale were keen to see him stay on loan until January 2009. McCrory returned to Plymouth at the end of 2008, despite manager Dean Glover's best efforts to extend the deal further; Plymouth wanted him back at Home Park.

He returned to Port Vale on a one-month loan in late August 2009. Vale were now under the management of Micky Adams, who initiated the loan after hearing how well McCrory had performed for the club in his previous spell from the club's chief scout Ray Williams and youth team manager Mark Grew. Plymouth had to help pay the teenager's wages, as Vale had already spent their playing budget with limited funds. After the spell was up McCrory was all ready to return to Plymouth, though his parent club then had a last minute change of heart and agreed to fund his loan at Vale Park for a further month. In total he made just two starts and three substitute appearance in his two months at Vale Park, before he returned to Plymouth to try to impress the new coaching regime that had been established in his absence.

On 9 November 2009, McCrory joined League Two side Grimsby Town on an initial one-month loan. McCrory cemented a place in the "Mariners" side, playing as the club's regular left-back for his two months at Blundell Park, being preferred to club left-back Joe Widdowson. Argyle recalled McCrory from his loan spell the following January; he had played for Grimsby eleven times in all competitions.

=== Dagenham & Redbridge ===
Despite interest to sign him permanently from Grimsby, McCrory joined League Two club Dagenham & Redbridge in February 2010 for a five-figure fee. He signed a 2 1/2-year deal with the club. He quickly established himself as the club's first choice left-back. He went on to play for the "Daggers" in the play-off final victory over Rotherham United; during the Wembley final, he set up Paul Benson for the first goal of a 3–2 win. He scored his first senior goal on 10 August, as he struck a "sublime" 25 yards (23 m) free kick to provide the opening goal of a 2–1 defeat to Milton Keynes Dons in the League Cup. He played a total of 23 League One games in 2010–11, as the club suffered relegation back into the Football League's basement division.

McCrory re-established himself as a consistent first-team member in the 2011–12 campaign. He gave away a penalty in the 3–1 defeat to Southend United in the Football League Trophy, which was saved. Still, he made amends for his actions by scoring a then-equalizing goal from a 66th-minute free kick. On 15 October, he was a key figure in the club's 3–2 defeat at home to his former club Plymouth Argyle; he provided assists for both of Dagenham's goal, only to be sent off in the 90th minute after fouling Isaac Vassell in the box – Simon Walton converted the resulting penalty to net the winning goal for Argyle. The red card was later rescinded. Seven days later he scored his first ever league goal, netting a free kick to provide a late consolidation goal in a 5–2 home defeat by Aldershot Town. In May 2012, McCrory was released by Dagenham after being told he would not be offered a new contract.

=== Burton Albion ===
In June 2012, he signed a two-year deal with Burton Albion after impressing the club's management with the way he caused problems for Jacques Maghoma the previous season. Manager Gary Rowett said that he would provide competition to veteran left-back Aaron Webster. He opened his goalscoring account for the club on 17 November, in a 3–2 win over former club Dagenham, and was rewarded with a place on the League Two Team of the Week. Burton reached the play-offs at the end of the 2012–13 season, but were defeated 5–4 by Bradford City at the semi-final stage.

He made 47 appearances in the 2013–14 campaign, helping the "Brewers" to secure a play-off spot. However, he damaged cartilage in his knee joint in April and was ruled out of action for four months. In his absence Burton went on to lose in the play-off final. He signed a new two-year contract with Burton in July 2014. He scored five goals in 36 appearances in the 2014–15 campaign as Jimmy Floyd Hasselbaink managed Burton to the League Two title. He was named in the Football League team of the week after scoring the opening goal of a 3–0 win at Gillingham on 12 December 2015. He made 41 appearances in the 2015–16 season as Burton won promotion out of League One for the first time in the club's history. New manager Nigel Clough offered him a new contract in the summer. McCrory stalled before eventually agreeing to a two-year deal. However, he was dropped at the start of the 2016–17 campaign as Clough initiated a 3–5–2 formation and did not rate McCrory as a wing-back, instead preferring to play Tom Flanagan and John Brayford.

He started the 2017–18 season with five appearances to his name, but with Stephen Warnock returning from injury, Clough decided to allow McCrory to leave the club on loan. On 31 August 2017, McCrory joined League One side Portsmouth on a five-month loan deal after loanee Tareiq Holmes-Dennis picked up a serious injury. Set to compete with Brandon Haunstrup for the left-back position at Fratton Park, he stated his aim was to find regular football Kenny Jackett's "Pompey". However, he twisted his knee after three games and was forced to undergo surgery, and was unable to feature again for the remainder of his loan spell. He was offered a new contract by Burton at the end of the 2017–18 season, following their relegation out of the Championship. However, the form of rival left-backs Reece Hutchinson and Colin Daniel meant that he was limited to 20 appearances during the 2018–19 season and was this time not offered a new contract in the summer.

=== Notts County ===
On 1 August 2019, McCrory was one of six players to sign for newly relegated National League club Notts County, having impressed manager Neal Ardley on trial. He scored one goal in 30 appearances for the "Magpies" in the 2019–20 season, which was permanently suspended on 26 March due to the COVID-19 pandemic in England, with Notts County in the play-offs in third-place. County reached the play-off final at Wembley Stadium, though McCrory was not in the match day squad as they lost 3–1 to Harrogate Town. He played just three games of the 2020–21 season after missing much of the campaign with a knee injury. He was released in the summer though head coach Ian Burchnall allowed him to return to pre-season training at Meadow Lane whilst he searched for a new club.

=== Later career ===
In July 2021, he dropped down two divisions to sign for Southern League Premier Division Central side Nuneaton Borough on a free transfer. He made 29 appearances in the 2021–22 campaign, scoring two goals.

On 6 July 2022, McCrory joined Northern Premier League Division One East club Grantham Town following their relegation. He featured 35 times in the 2022–23 campaign, including in the Lincolnshire Senior Cup final victory over Spalding United.

McCrory came out of retirement to play eight games for Midland League Division One side Leicester St Andrews in the second half of the 2024–25 season.

== International career ==
McCrory played twice for the Republic of Ireland under-18s in 2008, before being called up to the represent the under-19s the next year. Two of the under-19 games took place in Belgium for qualification to the 2009 Under-19 UEFA Championship. A 6–1 defeat to Switzerland ended Irish hopes of qualification for the tournament. Two days later, on 12 June 2009, they defeated Sweden 2–1. He won a total of nine caps for the under-19 team.

== Career statistics ==
As of match played 22 April 2023

Appearances and goals by club, season and competition
Club	Season	League			FA Cup		League Cup		Other		Total	
Club	Season	Division	Apps	Goals	Apps	Goals	Apps	Goals	Apps	Goals	Apps	Goals
Plymouth Argyle	2008–09	Championship	0	0	0	0	0	0	—		0	0
Plymouth Argyle	2009–10	Championship	0	0	0	0	0	0	—		0	0
Plymouth Argyle	Total		0	0	0	0	0	0	0	0	0	0
Port Vale (loan)	2008–09	League Two	12	0	2	0	—		—		14	0
Port Vale (loan)	2009–10	League Two	5	0	0	0	0	0	0	0	5	0
Port Vale (loan)	Total		17	0	2	0	0	0	0	0	19	0
Grimsby Town (loan)	2009–10	League Two	10	0	0	0	—		1 (Note: Appearances in the Football League Trophy / EFL Trophy)	0	11	0
Dagenham & Redbridge	2009–10	League Two	20	0	—		—		3 (Note: Appearances in the League Two play-offs)	0	23	0
Dagenham & Redbridge	2010–11	League One	23	0	2	0	1	1	0	0	26	1
Dagenham & Redbridge	2011–12	League Two	33	1	2	0	1	0	1	1	37	2
Dagenham & Redbridge	Total		76	1	4	0	2	1	4	1	86	3
Burton Albion	2012–13	League Two	42	1	4	0	3	0	3 (Note: One appearance in the Football League Trophy and two in the League Two play-offs)	0	52	1
Burton Albion	2013–14	League Two	40	1	4	0	2	0	1	0	47	1
Burton Albion	2014–15	League Two	34	5	1	0	0	0	1	0	36	5
Burton Albion	2015–16	League One	38	3	0	0	1	0	1	0	40	3
Burton Albion	2016–17	Championship	16	0	0	0	2	0	—		18	0
Burton Albion	2017–18	Championship	11	0	0	0	2	0	—		13	0
Burton Albion	2018–19	League One	15	0	1	0	2	0	2	0	20	0
Burton Albion	Total		196	10	10	0	12	0	8	0	226	10
Portsmouth (loan)	2017–18	League One	3	0	0	0	—		0	0	3	0
Notts County	2019–20	National League	25	1	3	0	—		2 (Note: Appearances in the FA Trophy)	0	30	1
Notts County	2020–21	National League	3	0	0	0	—		0	0	3	0
Notts County	Total		28	1	3	0	0	0	2	0	33	1
Nuneaton Borough	2021–22	Southern League; Premier Division Central	23	2	2	0	—		4 (Note: 2 appearances in the FA Trophy and 2 appearances in the Birmingham Senior Cup)	0	29	2
Grantham Town	2022–23	Northern Premier League; Division One East	29	1	4	0	—		2 (Note: Appearances in the Lincolnshire Senior Cup)	0	35	1
Leicester St Andrews	2024–25	Midland League; Division One	8	0	0	0	—		0	0	8	0
Career total			390	15	25	0	14	1	21	1	450	17

== Honours ==
Dagenham & Redbridge

- Football League Two play-offs: 2010

Burton Albion

- Football League One second-place promotion: 2015–16
- Football League Two: 2014–15

Grantham Town

- Lincolnshire Senior Cup: 2022–23
