= 2013–14 Burton Albion F.C. season =

Burton Albion
2013–14 season
- Chairman: Ben Robinson
- Manager: Gary Rowett
- Ground: Pirelli Stadium
- League Two: 6th
- FA Cup: Third round (Eliminated by Bournemouth)
- League Cup: Second round (Eliminated by Fulham)
- FL Trophy: First round (Eliminated by Notts County)
- Top goalscorer: League: Adam McGurk; Billy Kee (7); All: Billy Kee (9)
- Highest home attendance: 4,855 vs. Chesterfield (27 April 2014)
- Lowest home attendance: 1,784 vs. Wycombe Wanderers (25 March 2014), 1,777 vs Fleetwood Town (7 December 2013) FA Cup
- Average home league attendance: 2,720
Home colours	Away colours

The 2013-14 season is Burton Albion's fifth consecutive season in League Two. They finished 4th in the previous season but failed to get promotion via the playoffs. It is Gary Rowett's second season as manager of the club.

== Overview ==
=== League ===
Burton Albion's league campaign began well with a 2–2 away draw against Cheltenham Town on the opening day of the season, which was followed by a 1–0 victory versus Rochdale in their first home game of the season. In the following match they held off a Fleetwood Town comeback to beat the Lancashire side 3–2, to give them their first league away win since March 2013 (excluding play-offs).

=== Cup Competitions ===
==== League Cup ====
In the League Cup, Burton were drawn against Sheffield United away in the first round. They won 2–1. On 8 August 2013, they were drawn a home tie against Premier League side Fulham in the second round. Against Fulham, Albion equalised with five minutes remaining through Jack Dyer before taking the lead 12 minutes into extra-time, before conceding through Hugo Rodallega. After the 2–2 draw Phil Edwards was the only player to miss a penalty and Albion crashed out 4–5 in the shoot-out. After the match Burton manager Gary Rowett said he was incredibly proud to nearly knock the Premier League side out.

==== Football League Trophy ====
On 17 August 2013, Burton were drawn away to Notts County in the first round of the Football League Trophy.

== Transfers ==
Players transferred in
Date	Pos.	Name	Club transferred from	Fee	Ref.
18 June 2013	MF	(Scotland) Alex MacDonald	(England) Burnley	Free	
18 June 2013	FW	(England) Dominic Knowles	(England) Harrogate Town	Free	
18 June 2013	MF	(England) Adam Reed	(England) Sunderland	Free	
28 June 2013	DF	(England) Chris Hussey	(England) A.F.C. Wimbledon	Free	
29 June 2013	DF	(England) Phil Edwards	(England) Rochdale	Free	
29 June 2013	DF	(England) Ian Sharps	(England) Rotherham United	Free	
29 June 2013	DF	(England) Michael Symes	(England) Leyton Orient	Free	
13 July 2013	FW	(England) Rene Howe	(England) Torquay United	Free	
18 July 2013	MF	(Republic of Ireland) Rory Delap	(England) Stoke City	Free	
5 August 2013	FW	(Northern Ireland) Adam McGurk	(England) Tranmere Rovers	Free	
31 January 2014	FW	(England) Gary Alexander	(England) Crawley Town	Undisclosed	
31 January 2014	DF	(Scotland) David Gray	(England) Stevenage	Free	
Players transferred out
Date	Pos.	Name	Club transferred to	Fee	Ref.
19 June 2013	FW	(Democratic Republic of the Congo) Calvin Zola	(Scotland) Aberdeen	Free	
1 July 2013	FW	(Democratic Republic of the Congo) Jacques Maghoma	(England) Sheffield Wednesday	Free	
4 August 2013	MF	(Republic of Ireland) John McGrath	(England) Alfreton Town	Free	
Players loaned in
Date	Pos.	Name	Club loaned from	Loan Duration	Ref.
2 August 2013	GK	(England) Jordan Pickford	(England) Sunderland	Season-long	
17 August 2013	GK	(Norway) Mats Mørch	(England) Derby County	One Month	
28 November 2013	GK	(Switzerland) Benjamin Siegrist	(England) Aston Villa	One Month	
Players loaned out
Date	Pos.	Name	Club loaned to	Loan Duration	Ref.

== Squad ==
Last updated: 30 November 2013

No.	Name	Nationality	Date of birth (age)	Apps.	Goals
Goalkeepers
1	Benjamin Siegrist	(Switzerland)	31 January 1992 (age 34)	0	0
13	Kevin Poole	(England)	21 July 1963 (age 63)	133	0
16	Dean Lyness	(England)	20 July 1991 (age 35)	27	0
Defenders
2	Phil Edwards	(England)	8 November 1985 (age 40)	19	1
3	Chris Hussey	(England)	2 January 1989 (age 37)	19	3
5	Zander Diamond	(Scotland)	3 December 1985 (age 40)	49	6
6	Ian Sharps	(England)	23 October 1980 (age 45)	37	0
14	Damien McCrory	(Republic of Ireland)	23 February 1990 (age 36)	74	1
21	Marcus Holness	(England)	8 December 1988 (age 37)	41	1
25	Shane Cansdell-Sherriff	(Australia)	10 November 1982 (age 43)	10	0
Midfielders
4	Rory Delap	(Republic of Ireland)	6 July 1976 (age 50)	7	1
7	Lee Bell	(England)	20 November 1983 (age 42)	68	4
8	Robbie Weir	(Northern Ireland)	9 December 1988 (age 37)	70	9
10	Adam Reed	(England)	8 May 1991 (age 35)	6	1
11	Alex MacDonald	(Scotland)	14 April 1990 (age 36)	32	1
17	Jimmy Phillips	(England)	20 September 1989 (age 36)	112	3
22	Jack Dyer	(England)	11 December 1991 (age 34)	62	2
23	Matt Palmer	(England)	1 August 1993 (age 33)	20	1
27	Marcus Harness	(England)		1	0
Forwards
9	Rene Howe	(England)	22 October 1986 (age 39)	12	1
18	Dominic Knowles	(England)	13 February 1992 (age 34)	14	0
20	Adam McGurk	(Northern Ireland)	24 January 1989 (age 37)	20	7
28	Michael Symes	(England)	31 October 1983 (age 42)	28	6
29	Billy Kee	(Northern Ireland)	1 December 1990 (age 35)	82	31
	Gary Alexander	(England)	15 August 1979 (age 47)	0	0

== Results ==
Win	Draw	Loss

=== Pre-season ===
9 July 2013	Ilkeston	1–0	Burton Albion	New Manor Ground
19:45	Richards 33'	Report

13 July 2013	Alfreton Town	1–1	Burton Albion	North Street
15:00	Law 21'	Report	Delap 70'	Attendance: 334

16 July 2013	Nuneaton Town	0–0	Burton Albion	Liberty Way
19:00		Report

23 July 2013	Burton Albion	0–2	Derby County	Burton upon Trent
18:00		Report	Martin 45'; Sammon 87'	Stadium: Pirelli Stadium; Attendance: 3,627; Referee: Oliver Langford

26 July 2013	Burton Albion	1–0	Walsall	Burton upon Trent
19:45	Howe 2'	Report		Stadium: Pirelli Stadium; Attendance: 727

29 July 2013	Mickleover Sports	4–1	Burton Albion	Raygar Stadium
19:45	Oshoboke 7'; Davidson 31', 50'; Grocott 37'	Report	MacDonald 52'

=== League Two ===
3 August 2013 1	Cheltenham Town	2–2	Burton Albion	Cheltenham
15:00	Cureton 18'; Harrison 32'; Elliott (yellow card); Gornell (yellow card); Deering (yellow card)	Report	Kee 45' (pen.); Delap 56'; Reed (yellow card)	Stadium: Whaddon Road; Attendance: 3,189; Referee: Fred Graham

10 August 2013 2	Burton Albion	1–0	Rochdale	Burton upon Trent
15:00	Bell (yellow card) 37'; Howe 44'	Report	Cavanagh (red card) 7'; Henderson (yellow card) 35'	Stadium: Pirelli Stadium; Attendance: 2,679; Referee: Seb Stockbridge

17 August 2013 3	Fleetwood Town	2–3	Burton Albion	Highbury Stadium
15:00	Hughes 65'; Matt 72'; Hogan (yellow card) 87'	Report	Howe 12'; McGurk 25'; Hussey 34'; Lyness (yellow card) 87'	Attendance: 2,611; Referee: Bratt

24 August 2013 4	Burton Albion	2–2	Bury	Burton upon Trent
15:00	Bell (yellow card) 19'; Symes 83'; McGurk 90'	Report	Forrester 16'; Beeley (yellow card) 29'; Edjenguele 41' (yellow card) 45+1'; Sinnott (yellow card) 46'; Mayor (yellow card) 55'	Stadium: Pirelli Stadium; Attendance: 2,480; Referee: Breakspear

31 August 2013 5	Accrington Stanley	0–1	Burton Albion	Burton upon Trent
15:00	Murphy (yellow card) 15'; Joyce (yellow card) 43'	Report	McCrory (yellow card) 83'; Reed 90+8'	Stadium: Pirelli Stadium; Attendance: 1,174; Referee: Jeremy Simpson

7 September 2013 6	Burton Albion	0–2	Oxford United	Burton upon Trent
15:00	Sharps (red card) 36'; Howe (yellow card) 45+3'; Holness (yellow card) 86'	Report	Kitson (yellow card) 36'; Hunt (yellow card) 45'; Potter 49'; Rose 85'	Stadium: Pirelli Stadium; Attendance: 3,416; Referee: Michael Bull

14 September 2013 7	Burton Albion	1–2	Portsmouth	Burton upon Trent
15:00	Holness (yellow card) 53'; Phillips (yellow card) 67'; Diamond 90+6'	Report	Holmes 34'; Ferry 52'; Moutaouakil (red card) 84'	Stadium: Pirelli Stadium; Attendance: 3,577; Referee: Dean Whitestone

21 September 2013 8	AFC Wimbledon	3–1	Burton Albion	Kingsmeadow
15:00	Pell 55'; Midson 69'; Frampton 74'	Report	Holness (red card) 22'; McGurk 30'	Attendance: 4,005; Referee: M Russell

28 September 2013 9	Burton Albion	2–2	Scunthorpe United	Burton upon Trent
15:00	Kee 37'; MacDonald (yellow card) 56'; Bell (yellow card) 60'; Weir 62'	Report	Burton 48' (yellow card) 71'; Canavan 52'; Winnall (yellow card) 87'	Stadium: Pirelli Stadium; Attendance: 2,556; Referee: Keith Stroud

5 October 2013 10	Wycombe Wanderers	1–2	Burton Albion	Adams Park
15:00	Dunne (yellow card) 34' (yellow-red card) 48'; McClure 90+1'	Report	Kee 27', 52' (pen.); MacDonald (yellow card) 78'; Pickford (yellow card) 90+1'	Attendance: 3,518; Referee: Mark Brown

12 October 2013 11	Burton Albion	0–1	Southend United	Burton upon Trent
15:00	Kee (yellow card) 2' (yellow-red card) 45'; McGurk (yellow card) 20'	Report	Kiernan (yellow card) 15'; White (yellow card) 72'; Eastwood 90+2'	Stadium: Pirelli Stadium; Attendance: 2,555; Referee: Tony Harrington

19 October 2013 12	Chesterfield	0–2	Burton Albion	Proact Stadium
15:00		Report	McGurk 10', 14'	Attendance: 6,901; Referee: David Webb

22 October 2013 13	Burton Albion	2–0	Torquay United	Burton upon Trent
19:45	Cansdell-Sherriff (yellow card) 36'; Hussey (yellow card) 43'; Phillips 70'; McGurk 80'	Report		Stadium: Pirelli Stadium; Attendance: 2,005; Referee: Simon Hooper

26 October 2013 14	Exeter City	0–1	Burton Albion	St James Park
15:00		Report	Hussey (yellow card) 54'; Weir (yellow card) 61'; MacDonald (yellow card) 71'; Edwards 88'	Attendance: 3,658; Referee: David Coote

2 November 2013 15	Burton Albion	0–1	Morecambe	Burton upon Trent
15:00	Palmer (yellow card) 13'; Sharps (yellow card) 15'; Cansdell-Sherriff (yellow card) 63' (yellow-red card) 90+5'	Report	Hughes (yellow card) 19'; Williams 34'; Ellison (yellow card) 63'; Fleming (yellow card) 66'; Wright (yellow card) 83'; Kenyon (yellow card) 88'	Stadium: Pirelli Stadium; Attendance: 2,702; Referee: Tim Robinson

16 November 2013 16	Dagenham & Redbridge	2–0	Burton Albion	Victoria Road
15:00	Hines 8' (pen.) (yellow card) 9'; Howell 54'	Report	Edwards (yellow card) 3'; Palmer (yellow card) 27'; Weir (yellow card) 54'	Referee: David Phillips

23 November 2013 17	Burton Albion	1–0	Bristol Rovers	Burton upon Trent
15:00	Phillips (yellow card) 31' (yellow-red card) 90+1'; Cansdell-Sherriff (yellow card) 52'; Weir 59'	Report	Beardsley (red card) 37'; O'Toole (red card) 90+4'	Stadium: Pirelli Stadium; Attendance: 2,302; Referee: Paul Tierney

26 November 2013 18	Burton Albion	1–0	Mansfield Town	Burton upon Trent
19:45	Kee 78'	Report	Clements (yellow card) 21'	Stadium: Pirelli Stadium; Attendance: 2,759; Referee: Robert Lewis

30 November 2013 19	Plymouth Argyle	0–1	Burton Albion	Plymouth
15:00		Report	McGurk 12'; Edwards (yellow card) 45+3'; Hussey (yellow card) 76'; Phillips (yellow card) 80'	Stadium: Home Park; Attendance: 6,294; Referee: Graham Salisbury

14 December 2013 20	Burton Albion	1–1	York City	Burton upon Trent
15:00	Kee 72'; MacDonald (yellow card) 81'	Report	McGurk (yellow card) 35'; Cansdell-Sherriff 64' (o.g.)	Stadium: Pirelli Stadium; Attendance: 2,344; Referee: Graham Horwood

21 December 2013 21	Hartlepool United	1–1	Burton Albion	Hartlepool
15:00	Compton (yellow card) 66'; Walker 69'	Report	Edwards 18'; Weir (yellow card) 37'; Sharps (yellow card) 71'	Stadium: Victoria Park; Attendance: 3,595; Referee: Richard Clark

26 December 2013 22	Burton Albion	1–0	Northampton Town	Burton upon Trent
15:00	Sharps 85'	Report	Norris (yellow card) 37'; Carter (yellow card) 45+3'	Stadium: Pirelli Stadium; Attendance: 3,312; Referee: Richard Adcock

29 December 2013 23	Burton Albion	1–0	Newport County	Burton upon Trent
15:00	Cansdell-Sherriff (yellow card) 56'; Kee 79'	Report	Chapman (yellow card) 78'	Stadium: Pirelli Stadium; Attendance: 2,692; Referee: Geoff Eltringham

1 January 2014 24	Mansfield Town	0–0	Burton Albion	Huddersfield
15:00	Murray (yellow card) 68'; Howell (yellow card) 84'; Palmer (yellow card) 90+2'	Report	MacDonald (yellow card) 57'; Sharps (yellow card) 90+4'	Stadium: Field Mill; Attendance: 3,266; Referee: Trevor Kettle

11 January 2014 25	Burton Albion	2–1	Cheltenham Town	Burton upon Trent
15:00	Diamond (yellow card) 25'; Knowles 72', 85'	Report	Jombati (yellow card) 36'; Harrison 62'; Roofe (yellow card) 73'	Stadium: Pirelli Stadium; Attendance: 2,510; Referee: Seb Stockbridge

18 January 2014 26	Bury	0–0	Burton Albion	Bury
15:00	Veseli (yellow card) 90+4'	Report		Stadium: Gigg Lane; Attendance: 2,910; Referee: Oliver Langford

25 January 2014 27	Burton Albion	2–4	Fleetwood Town	Burton upon Trent
16:00	Roberts 50' (o.g.); Marrow 62' (o.g.)	Report	Ball 19'; Murdoch (yellow card) 25'; Pond 51' (yellow card) 63'; Parkin (yellow card) 56' (goal) 78'; Goodall (yellow card) 87'; Davies (yellow card) 90+2'; Brown 90+4'	Stadium: Pirelli Stadium; Attendance: 2,396; Referee: Darren Drysdale

28 January 2014	Torquay United	P–P	Burton Albion	Torquay
19:45		Report		Stadium: Plainmoor; Referee: Brendan Malone

1 February 2014 28	Burton Albion	1–1	Exeter City	Burton upon Trent
	McGurk 58'	Report	Davies (yellow card) 13'; Sharps 56' (o.g.); Butterfield (yellow card) 69'	Stadium: Pirelli Stadium; Attendance: 2,227; Referee: Gavin Ward

8 February 2014 29	Morecambe	0–1	Burton Albion	Morecambe
		Report	MacDonald (yellow card) 45+2'; Ismail 72'	Stadium: Globe Arena; Attendance: 1,478; Referee: Ross Joyce

15 February 2014 30	Burton Albion	1–1	Dagenham & Redbridge	Burton upon Trent
	Kee 69'; Cansdell-Sherriff 84'	Report	Connors (yellow card) 37' (yellow-red card) 55'; D'Ath 45'; Hoyte (yellow card) 85'	Stadium: Pirelli Stadium; Attendance: 2,934; Referee: Kevin Wright

18 February 2014 31	Rochdale	1–1	Burton Albion	Rochdale
19:45 GMT	Donnelly 67'; Done (yellow card) 75'; Kennedy (yellow card) 90+6'	Report	Phillips (yellow card) 25'; Ismail 35' (yellow card) 45+1'; Sharps (yellow card) 42'	Stadium: Spotland Stadium; Attendance: 2,092; Referee: Scott Duncan

21 February 2014 32	Bristol Rovers	2–0	Burton Albion	Bristol
19:45	Clarkson 70'; O'Toole 79'	Report		Stadium: Memorial Stadium; Attendance: 5,957; Referee: Keith Stroud

25 February 2014 33	Torquay United	1–1	Burton Albion	Torquay
19:45 BST	Benyon 40'	Report	McCrory 33'; Sharps (yellow card) 86'	Stadium: Plainmoor; Attendance: 1,583; Referee: Brendan Malone

1 March 2014 34	Burton Albion	2–1	Accrington Stanley	Burton upon Trent
15:00 GMT	Kee 34', 80' (pen.)	Report	Winnard 69'	Stadium: Pirelli Stadium; Attendance: 2,368; Referee: Andy Haines

8 March 2014 35	Oxford United	1–2	Burton Albion	Oxford
15:00	Williams 52'	Report	Knowles 10'; Ismail 26'	Stadium: Kassam Stadium; Attendance: 5,413; Referee: Andy Woolmer

11 March 2014 36	Portsmouth	0–0	Burton Albion	Portsmouth
19:45 GMT	N'Gala (yellow card) 63'; Padovani (yellow card) 63'; Wallace (yellow card) 88'	Report	(yellow card) 79' MacDonald	Stadium: Fratton Park; Attendance: 12,780; Referee: Carl Berry

15 March 2014 37	Burton Albion	1–1	AFC Wimbledon	Burton upon Trent
15:00 GMT	Kee 22' (pen.)	Report	Jones (yellow card) 27' (goal) 90+8'; S. Moore (yellow card) 63'; Frampton (yellow card) 84'	Stadium: Pirelli Stadium; Attendance: 2,592; Referee: Dean Whitestone

22 March 2014 38	Scunthorpe United	1–0	Burton Albion	Scunthorpe
15:00 GMT	Madden 60'	Report		Stadium: Glanford Park; Attendance: 4,209; Referee: Geoff Eltringham

25 March 2014 39	Burton Albion	1–0	Wycombe Wanderers	Burton upon Trent
	McGurk 54'	Report		Stadium: Pirelli Stadium; Attendance: 1,784; Referee: Mike Russell

29 March 2014 40	York City	0–0	Burton Albion	York
		Report		Stadium: Bootham Crescent; Attendance: 3,988; Referee: Darren Deadman

5 April 2014 41	Burton Albion	1–0	Plymouth Argyle	Burton upon Trent
15:00	McFadzean 26'	Report		Stadium: Pirelli Stadium; Attendance: 2,962; Referee: Mark Haywood

12 April 2014 42	Northampton Town	1–0	Burton Albion	Northampton
15:07	Marquis 42'	Report		Stadium: Sixfields Stadium; Attendance: 4,604; Referee: Carl Berry

19 April 2014 43	Burton Albion	3–0	Hartlepool United	Burton upon Trent
	Kee 28'; Phillips 58'; Bell 85'	Report		Stadium: Pirelli Stadium; Attendance: 2,558; Referee: Michael Bull

21 April 2014 44	Newport County	1–1	Burton Albion	Newport
	Sandell 5'	Report	Symes 36' (pen.)	Stadium: Rodney Parade; Attendance: 2,630; Referee: Brendan Malone

27 April 2014 45	Burton Albion	0–2	Chesterfield	Burton upon Trent
		Report	O'Shea 52', 79'	Stadium: Pirelli Stadium; Attendance: 4,855; Referee: Bobby Madley

3 May 2014 46	Southend United	1–0	Burton Albion	Southend-on-Sea
	Corr 22'	Report		Stadium: Roots Hall; Attendance: 6,218; Referee: Mark Haywood

==== Play-offs ====
11 May 2014 Semi-final first leg	Burton Albion	1–0	Southend United	Pirelli Stadium, Burton upon Trent
12:00 BST	McGurk 45'	BBC Report		Attendance: 4,581; Referee: Oliver Langford

17 May 2014 Semi-final second leg	Southend United	2–2 (2–3 agg.)	Burton Albion	Roots Hall, Southend-on-Sea
12:00 BST	Leonard 32'; Straker 39'	BBC Report	Holness 21'; McGurk 69'	Attendance: 9,696; Referee: Paul Tierney

26 May 2014 Final	Burton Albion	0–1	Fleetwood Town	Wembley Stadium, London
15:00 BST		BBC Report	Sarcevic 75'	Attendance: 14,007; Referee: Michael Naylor

==== League table ====
Pos	Team	Pld	W	D	L	GF	GA	GD	Pts	Promotion, qualification or relegation
4	Fleetwood Town (O, P)	46	22	10	14	66	52	+14	76	Qualification for League Two play-offs
5	Southend United	46	19	15	12	56	39	+17	72	Qualification for League Two play-offs
6	Burton Albion	46	19	15	12	47	42	+5	72	Qualification for League Two play-offs
7	York City	46	18	17	11	52	41	+11	71	Qualification for League Two play-offs
8	Oxford United	46	16	14	16	53	50	+3	62	

Updated to match(es) played on 3 May 2014. Source: BBC Sport
Rules for classification: 1) Points; 2) Goal difference; 3) Number of goals scored
(O) Play-off winners; (P) Promoted

==== Results summary ====
Overall								Home						Away					
Pld	W	D	L	GF	GA	GD	Pts	W	D	L	GF	GA	GD	W	D	L	GF	GA	GD
26	13	7	6	29	23	+6	46	7	3	4	15	12	+3	6	4	2	14	11	+3

==== Results by round ====
Round	1	2	3	4	5	6	7	8	9	10	11	12	13	14	15	16	17	18	19	20	21	22	23	24	25	26	27	28	29	30	31	32	33	34	35	36	37	38	39	40	41	42	43	44	45	46
Ground	A	H	A	H	A	H	H	A	H	A	H	A	H	A	H	A	H	H	A	H	A	H	H	A	A	H	A	H	A	H	A	H	A	H	A	A	H	A	H	A	H	A	H	A	H	A
Result	D	W	W	D	W	L	L	L	D	W	L	W	W	W	L	L	W	W	W	D	D	W	W	D	W	D	L																			
Position	11	6	5	5	3	6	10	12	13	12	14	12	8	6	7	11	7	7	6	6	6	4	3	2	2	3	5																			

Source: BBC Sport
A = Away; H = Home; W = Win; D = Draw; L = Loss

=== FA Cup ===
9 November 2013 First round proper	Burton Albion	2–0	Hereford United	Burton upon Trent
15:00	McGurk 37' (yellow card) 64'; Weir (yellow card) 67'; Palmer 84'	Report	Leadbitter (yellow card) 75'	Stadium: Pirelli Stadium; Attendance: 2,069; Referee: Chris Kavanagh

7 December 2013 Second round proper	Fleetwood Town	1–1	Burton Albion	Fleetwood
15:00	Sarcevic (yellow card) 39'; Hughes 83'	Report	Kee 90+3'	Stadium: Highbury Stadium; Attendance: 2,119; Referee: Eddie Ilderton

17 December 2013 Second round replay	Burton Albion	1–0	Fleetwood Town	Burton upon Trent
15:00	Kee 25'	Report		Stadium: Pirelli Stadium; Attendance: 1,777; Referee: Charles Breakspear

4 January 2013 Third round	Bournemouth	P–P	Burton Albion	Bournemouth
15:00				Stadium: Dean Court

14 January 2013 Third round	Bournemouth	4–1	Burton Albion	Bournemouth
19:45	Pitman 5', 88'; Elphick 45'; Ritchie (yellow card) 52'; Fraser 86'	Report	Edwards (yellow card) 29'; Phillips 35'	Stadium: Dean Court; Attendance: 10,343; Referee: Iain Williamson

=== League Cup ===
6 August 2013 First round	Sheffield United	1–2	Burton Albion	Bramall Lane
19:45	Doyle 64'	Report	Hussey 50', 90+4'	Attendance: 6,191; Referee: Eddie Ilderton

27 August 2013 Second round	Burton Albion	2–2 (4–5 p)	Fulham	Burton upon Trent
19:45	Dyer (yellow card) 66' (goal) 85'; Palmer (yellow card) 88'; Phillips (yellow card) 96'; Symes 102'		Taarabt 36'; Hangeland (yellow card) 90'; Rodallega (yellow card) 107' (goal) 117'	Stadium: Pirelli Stadium; Attendance: 4,002
	Penalties
	Symes (penalty scored); Reed (penalty scored); Edwards (penalty missed); McCrory (penalty scored); Hussey (penalty scored)		(penalty scored) Bent; (penalty scored) Ruiz; (penalty scored) Riether; (penalty scored) Rodallega; (penalty scored) Riise

=== Football League Trophy ===
3 September 2013 First round	Notts County	1–0	Burton Albion	Meadow Lane
19:45	McGregor 40'; Leacock (yellow card) 45+3'; Nangle (yellow card) 55'		Holness (yellow card) 90+1'	Attendance: 1,240; Referee: D Bond

== Squad statistics ==
Updated 16 April 2014

No.	Pos	Nat	Player	Total		League Two		FA Cup		League Cup		JP Trophy	
No.	Pos	Nat	Player	Apps	Goals	Apps	Goals	Apps	Goals	Apps	Goals	Apps	Goals
1	GK	(England) ENG	Rob Lainton	14	0	14	0	0	0	0	0	0	0
2	DF	(England) ENG	Phil Edwards	43	2	36+2	2	2	0	2	0	1	0
3	DF	(England) ENG	Chris Hussey	30	3	21+5	1	2	0	2	2	0	0
4	MF	(Republic of Ireland) IRL	Rory Delap	7	1	6	1	0	0	1	0	0	0
5	DF	(Scotland) SCO	Zander Diamond	11	1	6+4	1	1	0	0	0	0	0
6	DF	(England) ENG	Ian Sharps	41	1	36	1	2	0	2	0	1	0
7	MF	(England) ENG	Lee Bell	34	0	22+8	0	2	0	2	0	0	0
8	MF	(Northern Ireland) NIR	Robbie Weir	43	2	37+1	2	2	0	2	0	1	0
9	FW	(England) ENG	Rene Howe	18	1	7+8	1	1	0	1	0	0+1	0
10	MF	(England) ENG	Adam Reed	8	1	4+2	1	0	0	0+1	0	1	0
11	MF	(Scotland) SCO	Alex MacDonald	33	0	14+17	0	1	0	0+1	0	0	0
12	FW	(England) ENG	Ashley Hemmings	2	0	0+2	0	0	0	0	0	0	0
13	GK	(England) ENG	Kevin Poole	0	0	0	0	0	0	0	0	0	0
14	DF	(Republic of Ireland) IRL	Damien McCrory	45	1	40	1	2	0	2	0	1	0
16	GK	(England) ENG	Dean Lyness	20	0	16+1	0	1	0	1	0	1	0
17	MF	(England) ENG	Jimmy Phillips	34	1	25+6	1	0+2	0	0+1	0	0	0
18	FW	(England) ENG	Dominic Knowles	28	3	9+16	3	0+2	0	0	0	1	0
19	FW	(England) ENG	Zeli Ismail	13	3	10+3	3	0	0	0	0	0	0
20	FW	(Northern Ireland) NIR	Adam McGurk	37	10	31+3	9	2	1	1	0	0	0
21	DF	(England) ENG	Marcus Holness	13	0	11+2	0	0	0	0	0	0	0
22	MF	(England) ENG	Jack Dyer	6	1	0+4	0	0	0	0+1	1	1	0
23	MF	(England) ENG	Matt Palmer	40	1	28+8	0	1	1	1+1	0	1	0
24	MF	(England) ENG	Liam Slade	0	0	0	0	0+0	0	0	0	0	0
25	DF	(Australia) AUS	Shane Cansdell-Sherriff	32	0	31	0	1+0	0	0	0	0	0
26	DF	(Scotland) SCO	David Gray	11	0	5+5	0	0	0	0	0	0+1	0
27	MF	(England) ENG	Marcus Harness	1	0	0+1	0	0	0	0	0	0	0
28	FW	(England) ENG	Michael Symes	13	2	5+5	1	0	0	1+1	1	1	0
29	FW	(Northern Ireland) NIR	Billy Kee	37	12	27+7	11	1+1	1	0+1	0	0	0
	GK	(England) ENG	Callum McFadzean	4	1	4	1	0	0	0	0	0	0
Players featured for Burton but left before the end of the season:
1	GK	(Switzerland) SUI	Benjamin Siegrist	0	0	0	0	0	0	0	0	0	0
1	GK	(England) ENG	Jordan Pickford	13	0	12	0	0	0	1	0	0	0
13	GK	(Norway) NOR	Mats Mørch	0	0	0	0	0	0	0	0	0	0

=== Top scorers ===
Last updated: 4 January 2014

- Scorers are organised by goals and then alphabetically through surname.

#	Position	Nationality	Name	League Two	FA Cup	League Cup	FL Trophy	Total
29	FW	(Northern Ireland)	Billy Kee	7	2	0	0	9
20	FW	(Northern Ireland)	Adam McGurk	7	1	0	0	8
3	DF	(England)	Chris Hussey	1	0	2	0	3
2	DF	(England)	Phil Edwards	2	0	0	0	2
9	FW	(England)	Rene Howe	2	0	0	0	2
28	FW	(England)	Michael Symes	1	0	1	0	2
8	FW	(Northern Ireland)	Robbie Weir	2	0	0	0	2
4	DF	(Republic of Ireland)	Rory Delap	1	0	0	0	1
22	MF	(England)	Jack Dyer	0	0	1	0	1
10	FW	(England)	Adam Reed	1	0	0	0	1
5	DF	(Scotland)	Zander Diamond	1	0	0	0	1
17	MF	(England)	Jimmy Phillips	1	0	0	0	1
23	MF	(England)	Matt Palmer	0	1	0	0	1
6	DF	(England)	Ian Sharps	1	0	0	0	1
Total				27	4	4	0	35

=== Displinary Record ===
Last updated: 30 November 2013

- This is ordered by points, 1 pt for a yellow and 2 pts for a red.

#	Position	Nationality	Name	League Two		FA Cup		League Cup		Total	
#	Position	Nationality	Name	Booked	Sent off (straight red)	Booked	Sent off (straight red)	Booked	Sent off (straight red)	Booked	Sent off (straight red)
21	DF	(England)	Marcus Holness	2	1	0	0	1	0	3	1
7	MF	(England)	Lee Bell	4	0	0	0	0	0	4	0
25	DF	(Australia)	Shane Cansdell-Sherriff	2	1	0	0	0	0	2	1
11	MF	(Scotland)	Alex MacDonald	3	0	0	0	0	0	3	0
3	DF	(England)	Chris Hussey	3	0	0	0	0	0	3	0
29	FW	(Northern Ireland)	Billy Kee	1	1	0	0	0	0	1	1
6	DF	(England)	Ian Sharps	1	1	0	0	0	0	1	1
23	MF	(England)	Matt Palmer	1	0	0	0	1	0	2	0
20	FW	(Northern Ireland)	Adam McGurk	1	0	1	0	0	0	2	0
8	DF	(England)	Robbie Weir	1	0	1	0	0	0	2	0
17	MF	(England)	Jimmy Phillips	1	0	0	0	1	0	2	0
22	MF	(England)	Jack Dyer	0	0	0	0	1	0	1	0
16	GK	(England)	Dean Lyness	1	0	0	0	0	0	1	0
14	DF	(Republic of Ireland)	Damien McCrory	1	0	0	0	0	0	1	0
10	FW	(England)	Adam Reed	1	0	0	0	0	0	1	0
9	FW	(England)	Rene Howe	1	0	0	0	0	0	1	0
1	MF	(England)	Jordan Pickford	1	0	0	0	0	0	1	0
2	DF	(England)	Phil Edwards	1	0	0	0	0	0	1	0
Total				26	4	2	0	4	0	32	4
