= Matt Palmer (footballer) =

English footballer (born 1995)

Personal information
- Full name: Matthew Thomas Palmer
- Date of birth: 27 February 1995 (age 31)
- Place of birth: Derby, England
- Height: 5 ft 6 in (1.67 m)
- Position: Midfielder

Team information
- Current team: Notts County
- Number: 18

Youth career
- Derby County
- –2012: Burton Albion

Senior career*
Years	Team	Apps	(Gls)
2012–2018	Burton Albion	159	(6)
2016	→ Oldham Athletic (loan)	14	(1)
2018–2020	Rotherham United	24	(0)
2019–2020	→ Bradford City (loan)	18	(0)
2020–2021	Swindon Town	27	(1)
2020	→ Wigan Athletic (loan)	10	(0)
2021–	Notts County	193	(5)

International career
2022	England C	1	(0)
- * Club domestic league appearances and goals as of 18:00, 8 March 2025 (UTC)

Matthew Thomas Palmer (born 27 February 1995) is an English professional footballer who plays as a midfielder for EFL League One club Notts County.

== Career ==
=== Burton Albion ===
Palmer was born in Derby, Derbyshire. He joined Burton Albion's youth academy after being released by Derby County. He secured the award for most improved young player at the end of his first season as a scholar at the club. He made his debut on 15 November 2012 as an 89th-minute substitute in the FA Cup, in a 2–0 away win over Altrincham. He made his League Two debut on 5 April 2013, coming on 79 minutes into a 7–1 away defeat to Port Vale. Palmer's first goal came on 10 November 2013 in a 2–0 home win over Hereford United in the first round of the FA Cup. He came on as a 78th-minute substitute on 26 May in the 2014 League Two play-off final, in which Burton were beaten 1–0 by Fleetwood Town at Wembley Stadium.

Palmer joined League One club Oldham Athletic on 22 January 2016 on a one-month loan.

=== Rotherham United ===
Palmer signed for League One club Rotherham United on 25 January 2018 on a two-and-a-half-year contract for an undisclosed fee.

He joined newly relegated League Two club Bradford City on 5 July 2019 on a season-long loan.

=== Swindon Town ===
Palmer signed for club Swindon Town on 31 January 2020 on an 18-month deal after his contract was terminated at Rotherham United. He scored his first goal for Swindon in an EFL Trophy tie against Exeter City on 6 October 2020.

Palmer signed for Wigan Athletic on loan until 4 January 2021

On 14 May 2021 it was announced that he would leave Swindon at the end of the season, following the expiry of his contract.

=== Notts County ===
On 21 July 2021, Palmer joined Notts County F.C. signing a two-year-deal.

On 25 December 2022, Palmer extended his contract with Notts County F.C. until the end of the 2024-25 season.

He is currently the club's longest serving player.

== Career statistics ==
As of 8 March 2025

Appearances and goals by club, season and competition
Club	Season	League			FA Cup		League Cup		Other		Total	
Club	Season	Division	Apps	Goals	Apps	Goals	Apps	Goals	Apps	Goals	Apps	Goals
Burton Albion	2012–13	League Two	2	0	1	0	0	0	0	0	3	0
Burton Albion	2013–14	League Two	40	0	3	1	2	0	3 (Note: One appearance in Football League Trophy, two in League Two play-offs)	0	48	1
Burton Albion	2014–15	League Two	33	4	1	0	2	0	1 (Note: Appearance in Football League Trophy)	0	37	4
Burton Albion	2015–16	League One	14	0	1	0	2	1	1	0	18	1
Burton Albion	2016–17	Championship	36	1	1	0	2	0	—		39	1
Burton Albion	2017–18	Championship	11	1	0	0	3	0	—		14	1
Burton Albion	Total		136	6	7	1	11	1	5	0	159	8
Oldham Athletic (loan)	2015–16	League One	14	1	—		—		—		14	1
Rotherham United	2017–18	League One	14	0	—		—		2 (Note: Appearances in League One play-offs)	0	16	0
Rotherham United	2018–19	Championship	10	0	1	0	2	0	—		13	0
Rotherham United	Total		24	0	1	0	2	0	2	0	29	0
Bradford City (loan)	2019–20	League Two	18	0	0	0	0	0	0	0	18	0
Swindon Town	2019–20	League Two	1	0	0	0	0	0	0	0	1	0
Swindon Town	2020–21	League One	24	1	0	0	0	0	2 (Note: Appearances in EFL Trophy)	1	26	2
Swindon Town	Total		25	1	0	0	0	0	2	1	27	2
Wigan Athletic (loan)	2020–21	League One	10	0	0	0	0	0	0	0	10	0
Notts County	2021–22	National League	43	2	2	0	—		1 (Note: Appearance(s) in National League Play-Offs)	0	46	2
Notts County	2022–23	National League	46	2	0	0	—		2 (Note: Appearance(s) in National League Play-Offs)	0	48	2
Notts County	2023–24	League Two	16	0	0	0	0	0	1 (Note: Appearances in EFL Trophy)	0	17	0
Notts County	2024–25	League Two	31	0	2	0	0	0	0	0	33	0
Notts County	Total		136	4	4	0	0	0	4	0	193	4
Career total			363	12	12	1	13	1	13	1	450	15

== Honours ==
Burton Albion

- Football League Two: 2014–15
- Football League One second-place promotion: 2015–16

Rotherham United

- EFL League One play-offs: 2018

Notts County

- National League play-offs: 2023
- EFL League Two play-offs: 2026

Individual

- Notts County Player of the Year: 2021–22
- National League Team of the Year: 2022–23
