= 2014–15 Burton Albion F.C. season =

Burton Albion
2014–15 season
- Chairman: Ben Robinson
- Manager: Gary Rowett (until 27 October); Jimmy Floyd Hasselbaink (from 13 November)
- Ground: Pirelli Stadium
- League Two: 1st
- FA Cup: First round (Eliminated by Barnsley)
- League Cup: Third round (Eliminated by Brighton & Hove Albion
- FL Trophy: Second round (Eliminated by Doncaster Rovers
- Top goalscorer: League: Lucas Akins (9); All: Lucas Akins (9)
- Highest home attendance: 5,720 vs Northampton Town (25 April 2015)
- Lowest home attendance: 2,099 vs Exeter City (19 August 2014), 1,269 vs Doncaster Rovers (7 October 2014) Football League Trophy
- Average home league attendance: 3,237
Home colours	Away colours

The 2014–15 season was Burton Albion's sixth consecutive season in League Two. They finished 6th in the previous season but failed to get promotion via the playoffs. It was Gary Rowett's third season as manager of the club, he would leave in November to join Birmingham City. The club would appoint former Chelsea striker Jimmy Floyd Hasselbaink and under his leadership the club finished first earning promotion to the Football League One for the first time in the club's history.

== Match details ==
=== Pre-season ===
15 July 2014	Ilkeston	1–0	Burton Albion	New Manor Ground, Ilkeston
19:30 BST	Duffy 2' (pen.)	Report

19 July 2014	Burton Albion	4–0	Sheffield United	Burton upon Trent
15:00 BST	MacDonald 5'; Akins 12'; Knowles 43'; Cutajar 84'	Report		Stadium: Pirelli Stadium; Referee: Jonathan Moss

22 July 2014	Hednesford Town	0–2	Burton Albion	Hednesford
19:45 BST		Report	Akins 26'; Edwards 87'	Stadium: Keys Park; Referee: Chris Sarginson

29 July 2014	Burton Albion	0–1	Derby County	Burton upon Trent
19:30 BST		Report	Hendrick 44'	Stadium: Pirelli Stadium; Attendance: 3,743; Referee: Steve Bratt

2 August 2014	Burton Albion	0–0	Stoke City	Burton upon Trent
15:00 BST		Report		Stadium: Pirelli Stadium; Attendance: 1,836; Referee: Kevin Johnson

=== League Two ===
==== League table ====
Pos	Team	Pld	W	D	L	GF	GA	GD	Pts	Promotion, qualification or relegation
1	Burton Albion (C, P)	46	28	10	8	69	39	+30	94	Promotion to Football League One
2	Shrewsbury Town (P)	46	27	8	11	67	31	+36	89	Promotion to Football League One
3	Bury (P)	46	26	7	13	60	40	+20	85	Promotion to Football League One
4	Wycombe Wanderers	46	23	15	8	67	45	+22	84	Qualification for League Two play-offs (Note: Four teams play for one spot and promotion to Football League One.)
5	Southend United (O, P)	46	24	12	10	54	38	+16	84	Qualification for League Two play-offs

Updated to match(es) played on 23 May 2015. Source: BBC Sport
Rules for classification: 1) Points; 2) Goal difference; 3) Number of goals scored
(C) Champions; (O) Play-off winners; (P) Promoted

==== Results summary ====
Overall								Home						Away					
Pld	W	D	L	GF	GA	GD	Pts	W	D	L	GF	GA	GD	W	D	L	GF	GA	GD
46	28	10	8	69	39	+30	94	16	4	3	34	13	+21	12	6	5	35	26	+9

==== Results by round ====
Round	1	2	3	4	5	6	7	8	9	10	11	12	13	14	15	16	17	18	19	20	21	22	23	24	25	26	27	28	29	30	31	32	33	34	35	36	37	38	39	40	41	42	43	44	45	46
Ground	A	H	H	A	A	H	H	A	A	H	H	A	H	A	A	H	A	H	A	A	H	A	H	H	H	A	A	H	A	H	H	A	A	H	A	H	H	A	H	A	H	A	H	A	H	A
Result	W	W	W	D	W	W	W	L	L	W	L	W	L	W	L	D	W	W	L	D	W	D	W	W	W	D	D	W	W	D	W	W	L	L	W	W	W	W	D	D	W	W	D	W	W	W
Position	3	4	2	4	1	1	1	1	2	1	1	2	3	2	3	5	4	2	4	4	2	2	3	2	2	2	3	2	1	2	2	1	1	1	1	1	1	1	1	1	1	1	1	1	1	1

Source: Statto.com
A = Away; H = Home; W = Win; D = Draw; L = Loss

==== Matches ====
The fixtures for the 2014–15 season were announced on 18 June 2014 at 9am.

9 August 2014 1	Oxford United	0–1	Burton Albion	Oxford
15:00	Long (yellow card) 67'; Collins (yellow card) 81'	Report	MacDonald (yellow card) 14'; Akins 42'; Edwards (yellow card) 90+2'	Stadium: Kassam Stadium; Attendance: 5,370; Referee: Darren Handley

16 August 2014 2	Burton Albion	2–1	Dagenham & Redbridge	Burton upon Trent
15:00	Kee 84' (pen.), 88'	Report	Cureton 18'	Stadium: Pirelli Stadium; Attendance: 2,150; Referee: Chris Kavanagh

19 August 2014 3	Burton Albion	1–0	Exeter City	Burton upon Trent
19:45	Beavon 41'	Report	Sercombe (yellow card) 76'	Stadium: Pirelli Stadium; Attendance: 2,099; Referee: Mark Heywood

23 August 2014 4	Newport County	1–1	Burton Albion	Newport
15:00	Zebroski 37'	Report	Mousinho 51'; Edwards (yellow card) 79'	Stadium: Rodney Parade; Attendance: 2,872; Referee: Kevin Johnson

30 August 2014 5	Mansfield Town	1–2	Burton Albion	Mansfield
15:00	Beevers (yellow card) 67'; Rhead 75'	Report	MacDonald 42'; Beavon (yellow card) 52'; McLaughlin (yellow card) 64'; McFadzean 71'; Weir (red card) 87'	Stadium: Field Mill; Attendance: 2,966; Referee: Darren Drysdale

7 September 2014 6	Burton Albion	2–0	Portsmouth	Burton upon Trent
12:15	McGurk 2'; Akins 55'	Report		Stadium: Pirelli Stadium; Attendance: 2,980; Referee: Oliver Langford

13 September 2014 7	Burton Albion	2–0	York City	Burton upon Trent
15:00	Akins 55'; Mousinho 79'	Report		Stadium: Pirelli Stadium; Attendance: 2,890; Referee: Jeremy Simpson

16 September 2014 8	AFC Wimbledon	3–0	Burton Albion	Kingston upon Thames
19:45	Tubbs 21' (red card) 82'; Akinfenwa 37', 67'	Report		Stadium: Kingsmeadow; Attendance: 3,195; Referee: Andy Davies

20 September 2014 9	Bury	3–1	Burton Albion	Bury
15:00	Nardiello 48', 66'; Lowe 57'	Report	Jacob Blyth	Stadium: Gigg Lane; Attendance: 4,536; Referee: Geoff Eltringham

27 September 2014 10	Burton Albion	1–0	Cheltenham Town	Burton upon Trent
15:00	Beavon 34'; Blyth (yellow card) 83'	Report	Elliott (yellow card) 8'; Brown (yellow card) 83'	Stadium: Pirelli Stadium; Attendance: 2,225; Referee: David Webb

3 October 2014 11	Burton Albion	1–3	Cambridge United	Burton upon Trent
19:45	MacDonald (yellow card) 39'; Edwards (yellow card) 45+3'; Mousinho (yellow card) 45+4'; Akins 81'	Report	Elliott 35', 76'; Donaldson 64'	Stadium: Pirelli Stadium; Attendance: 2,683; Referee: Mick Russell

11 October 2014 12	Northampton Town	1–2	Burton Albion	Northampton
14:00	D'Ath (yellow card) 66'; Cresswell 80'; Stevens (yellow card) 90+1'	Report	Blyth 45'; Akins (yellow card) 80'; MacDonald 86'	Stadium: Sixfields Stadium; Attendance: 4,935; Referee: Gary Sutton

18 October 2014 13	Burton Albion	0–2	Morecambe	Burton upon Trent
15:00		Report	Fleming (yellow card) 56'; Ellison 59'; Kenyon 61'; Barkhuizen (yellow card) 85'	Stadium: Pirelli Stadium; Attendance: 2,560; Referee: Carl Boyeson

21 October 2014 14	Carlisle United	3–4	Burton Albion	Carlisle
19:45	Dempsey 12'; Potts 45+5'; White (yellow card) 51'; Asamoah 65'	Report	McCrory 5'; Bell 27'; Blyth 40'; MacDonald 45+2' (yellow card) 51'; Beavon (yellow card) 58' (yellow-red card) 90+5'	Stadium: Brunton Park; Attendance: 4,266; Referee: Scott Duncan

25 October 2014 15	Stevenage	1–0	Burton Albion	Stevenage
15:00	Parrett (yellow card) 14'; Sharps 84' (o.g.)	Report		Stadium: Broadhall Way; Attendance: 3,051; Referee: Andy Woolmer

1 November 2014 16	Burton Albion	1–1	Plymouth Argyle	Burton-on-Trent
15:00	MacDonald 32'	BBC Report	Reid 70'	Stadium: Pirelli Stadium; Attendance: 3,083; Referee: Charles Breakspear

17 November 2014 17	Wycombe Wanderers	1–3	Burton Albion	High Wycombe
19:45	Hayes 65' (pen.); Ephraim (yellow card) 89'; Lewis (yellow card) 90'	BBC Report	Edwards 38' (yellow card) 42'; MacDonald 49'; Blyth 68'; Lenihan (yellow card) 81'	Stadium: Adams Park; Attendance: 3,981; Referee: Graham Scott

22 November 2014 18	Burton Albion	1–0	Luton Town	Burton-upon-Trent
15:00	Edwards 47'; Weir (yellow card) 68'	Report	Wilkinson (red card) 90+3'	Stadium: Pirelli Stadium; Attendance: 4,772; Referee: James Adcock

29 November 2014 19	Shrewsbury Town	1–0	Burton Albion	Shrewsbury
15:00	Collins (yellow card) 70'; Akpa Akpro (yellow card) 74' (goal) 82'	Report	Mousinho (yellow card) 14'; Edwards (yellow card) 68'; Maynard (yellow card) 89'	Stadium: Greenhous Meadow; Attendance: 5,170; Referee: Seb Stockbridge

6 December 2014 20	Exeter City	1–1	Burton Albion	Exeter
15:00	Ribeiro 87'	Report	Blyth 60'; McCrory (yellow card) 90+3'	Stadium: St James Park; Attendance: 3,381; Referee: Pat Miller

13 December 2014 21	Burton Albion	4–0	Hartlepool United	Burton upon Trent
15:00	MacDonald 45', 46'; Cansdell-Sherriff 65'; Beavon 69'	Report	Austin (yellow card) 38'; Green (yellow card) 88'	Stadium: Pirelli Stadium; Attendance: 2,474; Referee: Gavin Ward

19 December 2014 22	Southend United	0–0	Burton Albion	Southend-on-Sea
19:45	Prosser (yellow card) 72'	Report	MacDonald (yellow card) 48'; Blyth (yellow card) 68'; Weir (yellow card) 84'	Stadium: Roots Hall; Attendance: 5,266; Referee: Charles Breakspear

26 December 2014 23	Burton Albion	2–0	Tranmere Rovers	Burton upon Trent
15:00	McCrory 23' (pen.); Cansdell-Sherriff 38'; Blyth (yellow card) 88'	Report	Ridehalgh (red card) 23'	Stadium: Pirelli Stadium; Attendance: 4,206; Referee: Keith Hill

3 January 2015 24	Burton Albion	1–0	Shrewsbury Town	Burton upon Trent
15:00	Beavon (yellow card) 19'; Lenihan (yellow card) 23'; Taft 60'; Blyth (yellow card) 72'	Report	Woods (yellow card) 45+1'; Collins (yellow card) 77'	Stadium: Pirelli Stadium; Attendance: 4,555; Referee: Brendan Malone

10 January 2015 25	Burton Albion	2–1	Mansfield Town	Burton upon Trent
15:00	Palmer 8'; Maynard 24'; Blyth (yellow card) 62'; Lenihan (yellow card) 70'	Report	Lambe 51'; Kee (yellow card) 54'	Stadium: Pirelli Stadium; Attendance: 3,506; Referee: Andy Haines

17 January 2015 26	Portsmouth	1–1	Burton Albion	Portsmouth
15:00	Wallace 36'; Dunne (yellow card) 43'	Report	Weir (yellow card) 70'; Lenihan 82'	Stadium: Fratton Park; Attendance: 14,323; Referee: Scott Mathieson

24 January 2015 27	York City	1–1	Burton Albion	York
15:00	Sinclair 70'; Fletcher (yellow card) 90+1'	Report	Taft (yellow card) 43'; Beavon (yellow card) 63'; McGurk 87'; Edwards (yellow card) 90+3'	Stadium: Bootham Crescent; Attendance: 3,398; Referee: Ben Toner

31 January 2015 28	Burton Albion	1–0	Bury	Burton upon Trent
15:00	Edwards 62'	Report	Tutte (yellow card) 88'	Stadium: Pirelli Stadium; Attendance: 3,049; Referee: Stuart Attwell

7 February 2015 29	Cheltenham Town	1–3	Burton Albion	Cheltenham
15:00	Brown (yellow card) 45+2'; Burns 55'	Report	Beavon 21'; McGurk 36'; Edwards 49'; Weir (yellow card) 81'	Stadium: Whaddon Road; Attendance: 2,389; Referee: Jeremy Simpson

10 February 2015 30	Burton Albion	0–0	AFC Wimbledon	Burton-upon-Trent
19:45	Mousinho (yellow card) 90+6'	Report	Phillips (red card) 65'; Akinfenwa (yellow card) 76'	Stadium: Pirelli Stadium; Attendance: 2,399; Referee: Seb Stockbridge

14 February 2015 31	Burton Albion	2–0	Oxford United	Burton-on-Trent
15:00	McGurk 13'; Weir (yellow card) 42'; Mousinho (yellow card) 80'; Akins 89'	Report	Whing (yellow card) 27'; Skarz (yellow card) 60'; Hylton (yellow card) 85'	Stadium: Pirelli Stadium; Attendance: 2,954; Referee: Peter Bankes

21 February 2015 32	Dagenham & Redbridge	1–3	Burton Albion	Dagenham
15:00 GMT	Jakubiak 67'	Report	McGurk 71'; El Khayati 75'; McCory 90'	Stadium: Victoria Road; Attendance: 1,718; Referee: (England) James Adcock

24 February 2015 33	Accrington Stanley	1–0	Burton Albion	Accrington
19:45 GMT	Windass 23'; Proctor (yellow card) 49'; Atkinson (yellow card) 84'	Report		Stadium: Store First Stadium; Attendance: 919; Referee: Mark Brown

28 February 2015 34	Burton Albion	0–1	Newport County	Burton upon Trent
15:00 GMT		Report	Storey 59' (yellow card) 85'; Jones (yellow card) 69'	Stadium: Pirelli Stadium; Attendance: 2,974; Referee: Andy Madley

7 March 2015 35	Hartlepool United	0–1	Burton Albion	Hartlepool
15:00 GMT	Tshibola (yellow card) 58'	Report	Akins (yellow card) 3'; Cuvelier 90'	Stadium: Victoria Park; Attendance: 3,289; Referee: Darren Bond

14 March 2015 36	Burton Albion	3–0	Accrington Stanley	Burton-upon-Trent
15:00 GMT	McCrory 27' (pen.); Edwards (yellow card) 73'; Beavon 74'; Palmer 85'	Report	Atkinson (yellow card) 27'	Stadium: Pirelli Stadium; Attendance: 3,293; Referee: Carl Boyeson

18 March 2015 37	Burton Albion	2–1	Southend United	Burton-upon-Trent
19:45 GMT	Mousinho (yellow card) 23'; Naylor (yellow card) 26'; Weir (red card) 45'; Palmer 56'; El Khayati 89'	Report	Corr 45'; Timlin (yellow card) 50'	Stadium: Pirelli Stadium; Attendance: 2,669; Referee: James Linington

21 March 2015 38	Tranmere Rovers	1–4	Burton Albion	Tranmere
15:00 GMT	Odejayi 35'; Ihiekwi (yellow card) 76'; Molyneux (yellow card) 79'; Dugdale (yellow card) 90+2'	Report	McCrory 18'; Akins 22'; Mousinho (yellow card) 57'; El Khayati 72'; Dugdale 90' (o.g.)	Stadium: Prenton Park; Attendance: 5,390; Referee: Tim Robinson

30 March 2015 39	Burton Albion	1–1	Stevenage	Burton-upon-Trent
19:45 GMT	Dembélé 45' (o.g.); Beavon (yellow card) 88'	Report	Naylor 12' (o.g.); Andrade (yellow card) 65'	Stadium: Pirelli Stadium; Attendance: 3,024; Referee: Gary Sutton

3 April 2015 40	Plymouth Argyle	1–1	Burton Albion	Plymouth
15:00 GMT	McHugh 86'	Report	Stewart 33'; Mousinho (yellow card) 35'; Atkins (yellow card) 54'; Beavon (yellow card) 84'	Stadium: Home Park; Attendance: 8,469; Referee: (England) Darren Sheldrake

6 April 2015 41	Burton Albion	1–0	Wycombe Wanderers	Burton-upon-Trent
15:00 GMT	Beavon (yellow card) 23'; McLaughlin (yellow card) 25'; McGurk 55'; Taft (yellow card) 85'	Report	Yennaris (yellow card) 15'; Mawson (yellow card) 90'	Stadium: Pirelli Stadium; Attendance: 4,284; Referee: (England) Darren Deadman

11 April 2015 42	Luton Town	0–1	Burton Albion	Luton
15:00 GMT	McNulty (yellow card) 72'	Report	Palmer 79'	Stadium: Kenilworth Road; Attendance: 8,680; Referee: (England) Andy Madley

15 April 2015 43	Burton Albion	1–1	Carlisle United	Burton-upon-Trent
19:45 GMT	Johnstone 90+8'	Report	Grainger 2'; Buddle (yellow card) 69'; Young (yellow card) 90+4'	Stadium: Pirelli Stadium; Attendance: 3,892; Referee: (England) Mark Haywood

18 April 2015 44	Morecambe	1–2	Burton Albion	Morecambe
15:00 GMT	Kenyon (yellow card) 8'; Ellison (yellow card) 40'; Arestidou (yellow card) 60'; Hughes 90'	Report	Akins 30' 60' (pen.); Edwards (yellow card) 87'	Stadium: Globe Arena; Attendance: 2,139; Referee: (England) Keith Stroud

25 April 2015 45	Burton Albion	3–1	Northampton Town	Burton-upon-Trent
15:00 GMT	Akins 4' 41' (pen.); Edwards 31'	Report	D'Ath 53'; Taylor (yellow card) 78'; Cresswell (yellow card) 87'	Stadium: Pirelli Stadium; Attendance: 5,720; Referee: (England) Richard Clark

2 May 2015 46	Cambridge United	2–3	Burton Albion	Cambridge
15:00 GMT	Elliott 25'; Simpson 69' (pen.)	Report	Beavon 11'; Taft (yellow card) 55'; McLaughlin (red card) 67'; Mousinho (yellow card) 69'; Edwards 77'; McCory (yellow card) 86'; Stewart 88'	Stadium: R Costings Abbey Stadium; Attendance: 7,109; Referee: (England) Oliver Langford

=== FA Cup ===
The draw for the first round of the FA Cup was made on 27 October 2014.

8 November 2014 First round	Barnsley	5–0	Burton Albion	Barnsley
15:00	Winnall 40', 42', 74'; Hourihane 56'; Cole 83'	Report		Stadium: Oakwell; Attendance: 5,158; Referee: David Webb

=== League Cup ===
The draw for the first round was made on 17 June 2014 at 10am. Burton Albion were drawn at home to Wigan Athletic.

12 August 2014 Round One	Burton Albion	2–1	Wigan Athletic	Burton upon Trent
19:45	Knowles 45+2'; Beavon 52'	Report	Fortuné 27'	Stadium: Pirelli Stadium; Attendance: 2,602; Referee: Pat Miller

26 August 2014 Round Two	Burton Albion	1–0	Queens Park Rangers	Burton upon Trent
19:45	MacDonald (yellow card) 27'; Mousinho (yellow card) 35'; McGurk 77'	Report	Simpson (yellow card) 59'; Dunne (yellow card) 76'	Stadium: Pirelli Stadium; Attendance: 3,999; Referee: Paul Tierney

24 September 2014 Round Three	Burton Albion	0–3	Brighton & Hove Albion	Burton upon Trent
19:45		Report	Ince 18'; LuaLua 37'; Mackail-Smith 66'; Calderón (red card) 88'	Stadium: Pirelli Stadium; Attendance: 3,253; Referee: Darren Bond

=== Football League Trophy ===
7 October 2014 Round Two	Burton Albion	0–3	Doncaster Rovers	Burton upon Trent
19:45		Report	Forrester 32'; Tyson 41' (pen.); Wellens 87'	Stadium: Pirelli Stadium; Attendance: 1,269; Referee: Mark Brown

== Transfers ==
Players transferred in
Date	Pos.	Name	Club transferred from	Fee	Ref.
28 May 2014	DF	(Australia) Shane Cansdell-Sherriff	(England) Preston North End	Free	
30 May 2014	DF	(England) George Taft	(England) Leicester City	Free	
6 June 2014	MF	(England) John Mousinho	(England) Preston North End	Free	
18 June 2014	FW	(England) Lucas Akins	(England) Stevenage	Undisclosed	
22 July 2014	GK	(Scotland) Jon McLaughlin	(England) Bradford City	Free	
1 September 2014	FW	(England) Stuart Beavon	(England) Preston North End	Undisclosed	
27 November 2014	DF	(Suriname) Kelvin Maynard	(Belgium) Royal Antwerp	Free	
8 January 2015	DF	(Bosnia and Herzegovina) Stefan Maletić	(Netherlands) Achilles '29	Free	
29 January 2015	FW	(Netherlands) Abdenasser El Khayati	(Netherlands) Kozakken Boys	Undisclosed	
17 February 2015	FW	(Guadeloupe) Mickaël Antoine-Curier	(Scotland) Hamilton Academical	Free	
Players transferred out
Date	Pos.	Name	Club transferred to	Fee	Ref.
7 May 2014	DF	(Scotland) Zander Diamond	(England) Northampton Town	Free	
30 May 2014	DF	(England) Chris Hussey	(England) Bury	Free	
27 June 2014	DF	(England) Marcus Holness	(England) Tranmere Rovers	Free	
18 August 2014	FW	(Northern Ireland) Billy Kee	(England) Scunthorpe United	Undisclosed	
2 February 2015	MF	(Scotland) Alex MacDonald	(England) Oxford United	Undisclosed	
Players loaned in
Date	Pos.	Name	Club loaned from	Loan end date	Ref.
30 June 2014	FW	(England) Stuart Beavon	(England) Preston North End	1 September 2014	
3 July 2014	MF	(England) Callum McFadzean	(England) Sheffield United	January 2015	
27 August 2014	FW	(England) Jacob Blyth	(England) Leicester City	3 May 2015	
21 October 2014	MF	(Republic of Ireland) Darragh Lenihan	(England) Blackburn Rovers	4 March 2015	
20 November 2014	MF	(England) Bryn Morris	(England) Middlesbrough	19 December 2014	
27 November 2014	GK	(England) Remi Matthews	(England) Norwich City	28 December 2014	
2 January 2015	GK	(Scotland) Scott Shearer	(England) Crewe Alexandra	3 May 2015	
30 January 2015	DF	(England) Tom Naylor	(England) Derby County	3 May 2015	
2 February 2015	MF	(Spain) Iván Calero	(England) Derby County	2 March 2015	
6 March 2015	MF	(Belgium) Florent Cuvelier	(England) Sheffield United	3 May 2015	
11 March 2015	MF	(Republic of Ireland) Callum Reilly	(England) Birmingham City	30 June 2015	
26 March 2015	MF	(England) Jack Dunn	(England) Liverpool	25 April 2015	
26 March 2015	DF	(England) Kevin Stewart	(England) Liverpool	25 April 2015	
26 March 2015	FW	(Scotland) Denny Johnstone	(England) Birmingham City	30 June 2015	
Players loaned out
Date	Pos.	Name	Club loaned to	Loan end date	Ref.
30 January 2015	FW	(England) Dominic Knowles	(England) Kidderminster Harriers	19 March 2015	
2 February 2015	MF	(England) Lee Bell	(England) Macclesfield Town	3 May 2015	
27 March 2015	MF	(England) Jimmy Phillips	(England) Alfreton Town	30 June 2015	
