= Dean Lyness =

English footballer (born 1991)

Personal information
- Full name: Dean James Lyness
- Date of birth: 20 July 1991 (age 35)
- Place of birth: Birmingham, England
- Height: 6 ft 3 in (1.91 m)
- Position: Goalkeeper

Team information
- Current team: Hamilton Academical
- Number: 1

Youth career
- Warley Boys
- Halesowen Town
- 2000–2008: Birmingham City

Senior career*
Years	Team	Apps	(Gls)
2008–2009	Birmingham City	0	(0)
2009–2011	Heart of Midlothian	0	(0)
2011	→ East Fife (loan)	0	(0)
2011–2012	Kidderminster Harriers	6	(0)
2012–2016	Burton Albion	37	(0)
2015–2016	→ Blackpool (loan)	7	(0)
2016	→ Blackpool (loan)	2	(0)
2016–2017	Blackpool	13	(0)
2017–2018	Nuneaton Town	27	(0)
2018–2019	St Mirren	4	(0)
2019	Raith Rovers	8	(0)
2019–2022	St Mirren	8	(0)
2022–2023	Airdrieonians	10	(0)
2023	St Patrick's Athletic	31	(0)
2024–2025	Hamilton Academical	30	(0)
2026–	Hamilton Academical	15	(0)

International career
2007	England U17	4	(0)
- * Club domestic league appearances and goals as of 19:18, 18 November 2026 (UTC)

Dean James Lyness (born 20 July 1991) is an English former footballer who played as a goalkeeper for Scottish League One club Hamilton Academical.

Lyness began his career as a youngster with Birmingham City, but never played for the first team. He signed for Scottish Premier League club Heart of Midlothian in 2009, and spent a spell on loan at East Fife of the Scottish Second Division, but again, never played first-team football. On returning to England in 2011, he spent a season with Conference Premier club Kidderminster Harriers, playing ten matches, and then joined Burton Albion, with whom he made his first appearance in the Football League. After two spells on loan to Blackpool and a season with the club on a permanent basis, Lyness spent the 2017–18 season with Nuneaton Town of the National League North.

He returned to the Scottish top flight with St Mirren on a short-term contract in September 2018, and spent the second half of the season with Scottish League One club Raith Rovers before rejoining St Mirren. Over the next three seasons, he was the regular backup goalkeeper but made only seven first-team appearances, and signed for Airdrieonians in October 2022 on a short term basis. In 2023 he moved to League of Ireland Premier Division club St Patrick's Athletic, where he played for a season and won the 2023 FAI Cup. In early 2024 he moved to Hamilton Academical and helped them to promotion to the Scottish Championship in his first half season at the club.

In international football, Lyness was capped four times for England at under-17 level.

== Career ==
Lyness was born in Birmingham and raised in Halesowen, where he attended Leasowes Community College. He joined Birmingham City at the age of nine after playing for Warley Boys and for Halesowen Town Colts. By February 2007, still only 15 years old, he had made his reserve-team debut. He was a regular on the bench for the reserves in the 2007–08 season, behind either Artur Krysiak or Colin Doyle, and picked up a Birmingham Senior Cup-winners' medal as an unused substitute. In February 2009, he was named on the bench for Championship matches against Coventry City and Crystal Palace when regular substitute Doyle was struggling with a back problem. He kept goal as Birmingham reached the semifinal of the FA Youth Cup, and his third and last appearance in the first-team matchday squad came when Maik Taylor was suspended for the visit to Watford. Taylor described him as a "level-headed lad, gets his head down, works extremely hard", and was "sure he will definitely have a good career ahead of him if he keeps progressing." A few days later, Lyness was one of several youngsters told their future lay elsewhere.

=== Heart of Midlothian ===
Lyness joined Scottish Premier League club Heart of Midlothian in the 2009 close season. He played for their under-19 team, and was in goal when they beat South of Scotland League side St Cuthbert Wanderers 18–0 in the Scottish Youth Cup. Lyness was an unused substitute for the last four matches of the 2009–10 Scottish Premier League season, and came close to making a first-team debut in the Edinburgh derby against Hibernian in April 2010, but Jamie MacDonald declared himself fit to play despite a virus that had prevented him from training ahead of the match. In 2010–11, Lyness had no matchday involvement with Hearts' first team. In January 2011, he joined Scottish League Second Division club East Fife on loan, to gain experience but, as at Birmingham and Hearts previously, he appeared on the first-team substitutes' bench but never on the field. He was released by Hearts at the end of the season, and returned to the Midlands.

=== Kidderminster Harriers ===
Lyness signed a one-year contract with Conference club Kidderminster Harriers, as competition for the club's player of the year, Danny Lewis. When a knee injury broke Lewis's run of 60 consecutive Conference appearances, Lyness "produced one fine save on a more than satisfying Harriers debut" in a 1–0 win away to Kettering Town. Lyness played six Conference matches and two in the FA Cup, the second of which was a 4–1 defeat to Conference North club Corby Town, but when Lewis's injury was confirmed as serious, Kidderminster brought in the more "streetwise" goalkeeper Tony Breeden, who went straight into the starting eleven for the Conference win against Tamworth. A hip injury prevented Lyness replacing the cup-tied Breeden for FA Trophy matches against Vauxhall Motors, but he came back in for the next two rounds, and saved a penalty, albeit in a losing cause, against Luton Town. Hopes that his performance might earn him selection in the Conference team were in vain, as Breeden retained the starting place for the remainder of the season.

=== Burton Albion ===
Lyness signed a new contract with Kidderminster at the end of the season, but was happy to take the chance to move into the Football League when League Two club Burton Albion offered him a two-year deal. He had previously worked with Burton's goalkeeping coach Kevin Poole at Birmingham. He made an eventful debut. Football League Trophy rules restricting the number of team changes from the previous match prevented manager Gary Rowett from including Lyness from the start of Burton's visit to Coventry City, but he was brought on at half-time to replace Ross Atkins. He kept a clean sheet in the second half and then through extra time. In the penalty shootout, the first nine players from each team scored before Burton's tenth penalty was saved. Lyness then saved Coventry's tenth kick to keep his team in the contest, but when his own attempt was saved by Joe Murphy, he was unable to reciprocate, and Murphy's successful kick put Coventry through to the next round.

He made his Football League debut on 23 October 2012, again as a substitute, replacing the injured Stuart Tomlinson with 11 minutes plus stoppage time left in a 1–1 draw with Port Vale. On his first League start, against Dagenham & Redbridge, he conceded a first-half penalty, which he then saved by turning it onto the post, but was unable to stop the shot from the rebound; Burton won 3–2. He kept his place until mid-January, when a positional error left him unable to deal with a looped shot from Adebayo Akinfenwa that gave Northampton Town a win. Although Rowett was unwilling to blame Lyness, he selected Tomlinson for the next match, and Lyness regained a starting place only after a 7–1 defeat to Port Vale in April looked like derailing Burton's promotion chances. He played three matches – two wins and one loss – before Tomlinson came back in for the last match of the regular season and the playoff semi-final defeat to Bradford City.

Loanee Jordan Pickford began the 2013–14 season in goal for Burton, but Lyness took over when injury forced Pickford's return to parent club Sunderland in mid-August. He had a run of games, including a League Cup shootout against Premier League club Fulham in which the final penalty went in off the post and Lyness' backside. Rowett had said that Lyness would get the chance to establish himself as first choice, but Pickford went straight back into the team when his loan resumed. His recall by Sunderland in November gave Lyness another chance, and he kept two clean sheets and was man of the match against Mansfield Town. Despite the arrival of Swiss under-21 international Benjamin Siegrist, signed on loan because the club had no goalkeeping cover apart from the 50-year-old Poole, Lyness kept his place in the starting eleven for the next match, away at Plymouth Argyle, and kept his third consecutive clean sheet.

On 12 November 2015, Lyness joined fellow League One side Blackpool on loan until 2 January 2016. He rejoined the club for a second loan spell in February 2016.

=== Blackpool ===
On 31 August 2016, Lyness returned to Blackpool on a one-year deal following his release from Burton Albion. He played 15 matches in all competitions before leaving the club when his contract expired.

=== Nuneaton Town ===
On 8 August 2017, Lyness joined National League North team Nuneaton Town on a permanent deal. He left Nuneaton at the end of the 2017/18 season.

=== St Mirren ===
Lyness signed a short-term contract with Scottish Premiership club St Mirren in September 2018. He was released by St Mirren in January 2019, as the contract was not renewed.

=== Raith Rovers ===
On 16 January 2019, Lyness signed for Scottish League One side, Raith Rovers until the end of the season. He made 12 appearances, and left the club at the end of his contract.

=== St Mirren (2nd spell) ===
Lyness returned to St Mirren on a two-year deal in June 2019, after leaving the club less than a year before. On 22 December 2021 Lyness was brought into the match day XI against Celtic following a spread of covid amongst the St Mirren Squad which forced 11 players to be deemed unavailable. Lyness produced a man of the match performance that will live long in the memory of saints fans. On 6 October 2022 it was announced that Lyness and St Mirren had again parted company.

=== Airdrieonians ===
Lyness signed for Scottish League One club Airdrieonians on 8 October 2022 on a short-term deal. Lyness departed the club in January 2023 upon the end of his contract, after making 11 appearances in all competitions for the club.

=== St Patrick's Athletic ===
In March 2023, Lyness signed for League of Ireland Premier Division club St Patrick's Athletic, making his debut on 17 March 2023, in a 2–2 draw away to rivals Shamrock Rovers at Tallaght Stadium. He was voted as the club's Player of the Month by their supporters for the month of April 2023. On 12 July 2023, Lyness made his first appearance in European competition in a 2–1 loss against F91 Dudelange in the first qualifying round of the UEFA Europa Conference League at the Stade Jos Nosbaum. On 28 October 2023, he was named as the club's Player of the Year for 2023. On 12 November 2023, Lyness was part of the starting XI in the 2023 FAI Cup Final, in a 3–1 win over Bohemians in front of a record breaking FAI Cup Final crowd of 43,881 at the Aviva Stadium.

=== Hamilton Academical ===
On 26 January 2024, Lyness returned to his family in Scotland, signing for Scottish League One club Hamilton Academical until the end of the season. Lyness made 15 appearances for the club in all competitions by the end of the season, as they finished in second place and earned promotion to the Scottish Championship via the play-offs. In June 2024, he signed a new contract with the club, also holding the role of first-team goalkeeping coach.

In July 2026, he re-signed for the Accies on a two-year deal.

== International career ==
Lyness was capped four times by England at under-17 level in 2007, featuring alongside the likes of Jack Wilshere and Andros Townsend. He made his debut on 30 July, keeping a clean sheet as England beat Iceland U17 2–0 in the Nordic Tournament, and also played in the same competition a few days later. Needing only a draw to progress to the final, England lost 2–0. He also played against Turkey in the FA International Tournament in August, and his last international appearance, in a 6–0 defeat of Estonia in October, contributed towards England's progress to the elite qualification round for the European Under-17 Championships.

== Career statistics ==
As of match played 14 November 2026

Appearances and goals by club, season and competition
Club	Season	League			National cup (Note: Includes FA Cup, Scottish Cup and FAI Cup)		League cup (Note: Includes Football League Cup / EFL Cup and Scottish League Cup)		Other		Total	
Club	Season	Division	Apps	Goals	Apps	Goals	Apps	Goals	Apps	Goals	Apps	Goals
Birmingham City	2008–09	Championship	0	0	0	0	0	0	—		0	0
Heart of Midlothian	2009–10	Scottish Premier League	0	0	0	0	0	0	0	0	0	0
Heart of Midlothian	2010–11	Scottish Premier League	0	0	0	0	0	0	—		0	0
Heart of Midlothian	Total		0	0	0	0	0	0	0	0	0	0
East Fife (loan)	2010–11	Scottish Second Division	0	0	—		—		—		0	0
Kidderminster Harriers	2011–12	Conference National	6	0	2	0	—		2 (Note: Appearance(s) in the FA Trophy)	0	10	0
Burton Albion	2012–13	League Two	15	0	2	0	0	0	1 (Note: Appearance(s) in the Football League Trophy)	0	18	0
Burton Albion	2013–14	League Two	21	0	4	0	1	0	4 (Note: One appearance in the Football League Trophy, three in the League Two play-offs)	0	30	0
Burton Albion	2014–15	League Two	1	0	1	0	0	0	1	0	3	0
Burton Albion	2015–16	League One	0	0	0	0	0	0	0	0	0	0
Burton Albion	Total		37	0	7	0	1	0	6	0	51	0
Blackpool (loan)	2015–16	League One	7	0	—		—		—		7	0
Blackpool (loan)	2015–16	League One	2	0	—		—		—		2	0
Blackpool	2016–17	League Two	13	0	0	0	0	0	2 (Note: Appearance(s) in the EFL Trophy)	0	15	0
Blackpool	Total		22	0	0	0	0	0	2	0	24	0
Nuneaton Town	2017–18	National League North	27	0	2	0	—		5 (Note: Two appearances in the FA Trophy, three in the Birmingham Senior Cup)	0	34	0
St Mirren	2018–19	Scottish Premiership	4	0	—		0	0	—		4	0
Raith Rovers	2018–19	Scottish League One	8	0	0	0	—		4 (Note: Appearances in the Scottish Championship play-offs)	0	12	0
St Mirren	2019–20	Scottish Premiership	0	0	0	0	0	0	—		0	0
St Mirren	2020–21	Scottish Premiership	2	0	0	0	0	0	—		2	0
St Mirren	2021–22	Scottish Premiership	6	0	0	0	1	0	—		7	0
St Mirren	Total		8	0	0	0	1	0	—		9	0
St Mirren U21	2019–20	—	—		—		—		4 (Note: Appearance(s) in the Scottish Challenge Cup)	0	4	0
Airdrieonians	2022–23	Scottish League One	10	0	1	0	—		—		11	0
St Patrick's Athletic	2023	LOI Premier Division	31	0	5	0	—		2 (Note: Appearances in the UEFA Europa Conference League)	0	38	0
Hamilton Academical	2023–24	Scottish League One	11	0	—		—		4	0	15	0
Hamilton Academical	2024–25	Scottish Championship	19	0	1	0	2	0	2	0	24	0
Hamilton Academical	2025–26	Scottish League One	—		—		1	0	—		1	0
Hamilton Academical	Total		30	0	1	0	3	0	6	0	40	0
Hamilton Academical	2026–27	Scottish League One	15	0	0	0	4	0	2	0	21	0
Career total			198	0	18	0	9	0	33	0	256	0

== Honours ==
=== Club ===
Blackpool

- EFL League Two play-offs: 2017

St Patrick's Athletic

- FAI Cup: 2023

Hamilton Academical

- Scottish Championship play-offs: 2023–24

=== Individual ===
- St Patrick's Athletic Player of the Year: 2023
