= Callum McFadzean =

English footballer (born 1994)

Personal information
- Full name: Callum Jeffrey McFadzean
- Date of birth: 16 January 1994 (age 32)
- Place of birth: Waterthorpe, Sheffield, England
- Position: Wing-back

Team information
- Current team: Radcliffe

Youth career
- Sheffield United

Senior career*
Years	Team	Apps	(Gls)
2012–2016	Sheffield United	16	(0)
2013–2014	→ Chesterfield (loan)	4	(0)
2014	→ Burton Albion (loan)	7	(1)
2014–2015	→ Burton Albion (loan)	9	(1)
2015–2016	→ Stevenage (loan)	6	(0)
2016–2017	Kilmarnock	4	(0)
2017	Alfreton Town	9	(0)
2017–2018	Guiseley	24	(1)
2018–2019	Bury	40	(0)
2019–2020	Plymouth Argyle	25	(3)
2020–2021	Sunderland	25	(1)
2021–2022	Crewe Alexandra	10	(0)
2022–2024	Wrexham	44	(0)
2025–	Radcliffe	7	(0)

International career
2009–2010	England U16	5	(0)
2015	Scotland U21	3	(0)
- * Club domestic league appearances and goals as of 13:52, 4 June 2025 (UTC)

Callum Jeffrey McFadzean (born 16 January 1994) is a professional footballer who plays as a left sided wing-back for National League North club Radcliffe. His versatility has also seen him play as a centre-back.

Born in Sheffield, England, he came through the ranks at his home-town club, has also represented England at under-16 level, but has since opted to play for Scotland at under-21 level. He had loan spells with Chesterfield, Burton Albion and Stevenage. He then joined Kilmarnock before spells with non-league Alfreton Town and Guiseley. He then had one-year spells at Bury, Plymouth Argyle and Sunderland, and half a season at Crewe Alexandra before joining Wrexham

== Club career ==
=== Sheffield United ===
A product of Sheffield United's Academy McFadzean was a member of the team that reached the final of the FA Youth Cup in 2011, scoring in the first leg of the final against Manchester United. He was eventually promoted to the senior squad and made his professional début in the first game of the 2012–13 season, a League Cup tie against Burton Albion. Now on the fringes of the first team and regularly securing a place on the bench, McFadzean made his first start for the Blades in the Johnstones Paint Trophy against Coventry City at the Ricoh Arena. Following a handful of substitute appearances that season, McFadzean was handed a more prominent role by caretaker manager Chris Morgan following the departure of Danny Wilson in April 2012. After a number of first-team starts at the tail end of the season, McFadzean came off the bench to score the winning goal in the first leg of United's play-off semi-final against Yeovil Town. Following his successful end to the season McFadzean had had his contract with the Blades extended in June 2013.

==== Loan spells ====
McFadzean started the following season as part of the first team but was sidelined by injury during September. Following the arrival of new United manager Nigel Clough, McFadzean joined Chesterfield in November 2013 on a short-term loan. McFadzean returned to his parent club in January 2014 after making five appearances for Chesterfield, but remained out of United's first team picture, and in March 2014, McFadzean joined League Two side Burton Albion on an initial one-month loan. McFadzean remained with Burton for the remainder of the season, scoring one goal and making ten appearances for his temporary employers, including playing in Burton's unsuccessful appearance in the play-off final at Wembley.

On 3 July 2014, McFadzean rejoined Burton Albion on a six-month loan deal. On 7 October 2014, McFadzean was ruled out for up to two months after breaking his fifth metatarsal bone in a match against Cambridge United.

On 26 November 2015, McFadzean joined Stevenage on a one-month loan. At the end of the 2015–16 season, he was released by Sheffield United.

=== Kilmarnock ===
On 24 June 2016, McFadzean signed for Scottish Premiership club Kilmarnock.

=== Alfreton Town ===
McFadzean moved to Alfreton Town in March 2017. He was released by the club at the end of the season.

=== Guiseley ===
In July 2017 he signed for Guiseley after a successful trial.

=== Bury ===
After a year with Guiseley, he was on the move again in August 2018, this time signing a six-month contract with Bury after a successful trial with the Gigg Lane club. On 26 October 2018, McFadzean was offered a contract extension to the end of the 2018–19 season.

=== Plymouth Argyle ===
After Bury were expelled from the Football League, McFadzean joined Plymouth Argyle, making his debut on the opening day of the 2019–20 season as Argyle won 3–0 against Crewe Alexandra. In July 2020, McFadzean turned down a new contract with Plymouth Argyle.

=== Sunderland ===
On 21 October 2020, McFadzean joined League One side Sunderland on a one-year deal. McFadzean made his debut in the FA Cup against Mansfield Town on 7 November 2020. He scored his first goal for Sunderland on 10 November 2020 in an EFL Trophy group game against Fleetwood Town. On 25 May 2021 it was announced that he would leave Sunderland at the end of the season, following the expiry of his contract.

=== Crewe Alexandra ===
On 30 July 2021, he was announced as manager David Artell's fifth summer signing at League One rivals Crewe Alexandra, signing a one-year contract. He made his Crewe debut in a League Cup first round tie at Hartlepool United on 10 August 2021, but made just four further appearances before leaving the club by mutual consent in January 2022.

=== Wrexham ===
On 27 January 2022, McFadzean signed for National League club Wrexham on a two-and-a-half-year deal. On 3 May 2024, the club announced he would be released in the summer when his contract expired.

=== Radcliffe ===
On 4 June 2025, following twelve months without a club, McFadzean joined National League North side Radcliffe on a one-year deal.

== International career ==
McFadzean made five appearances for England's under-16 squad during the 2009–10 season. McFadzean is also eligible to represent Scotland due to his Scottish heritage. He was selected for the Scotland under-21 squad in March 2015.

== Personal life ==
McFadzean was born in Sheffield and continues to live in the Waterthorpe district of the city. He is the younger brother of Chesterfield defender Kyle McFadzean, who also started his career at Bramall Lane.

=== Assault charges ===
In October 2013, McFadzean was released on bail after being charged with two counts of assault and two counts of threatening behaviour after an incident in Sheffield city centre earlier the same month. McFadzean pleaded guilty to two charges of assault when his case came to court in November 2013, admitting to hitting one female friend and headbutting another while drunk. As a result, he was given a community order with 12 months' supervision.

== Career statistics ==
As of end of 2023–24 season

Appearances and goals by club, season and competition
Club	Season	League			National Cup		League Cup		Other		Total	
Club	Season	Division	Apps	Goals	Apps	Goals	Apps	Goals	Apps	Goals	Apps	Goals
Sheffield United	2012–13	League One	8	0	0	0	1	0	3 (Note: Two appearances one goal in League One play-offs; one appearance in Football League Trophy)	1	12	1
Sheffield United	2013–14	League One	7	0	0	0	1	0	1 (Note: Appearance(s) in Football League Trophy)	0	9	0
Sheffield United	2014–15	League One	0	0	0	0	—		0	0	0	0
Sheffield United	2015–16	League One	1	0	0	0	1	0	0	0	2	0
Sheffield United	Total		16	0	0	0	3	0	4	1	23	1
Chesterfield (loan)	2013–14	League Two	4	0	1	0	—		—		5	0
Burton Albion (loan)	2013–14	League Two	7	1	—		—		3 (Note: Appearance(s) in League Two play-offs)	0	10	1
Burton Albion (loan)	2014–15	League Two	9	1	0	0	2	0	0	0	11	1
Burton Albion (loan)	Total		16	2	0	0	2	0	3	0	21	2
Stevenage (loan)	2015–16	League Two	6	0	0	0	—		—		6	0
Kilmarnock	2016–17	Scottish Premiership	4	0	0	0	1	0	—		5	0
Alfreton Town	2016–17	National League North	9	0	—		—		—		9	0
Guiseley	2017–18	National League	24	1	1	0	—		2 (Note: One appearance in FA Trophy; one appearance in West Riding County Cup)	0	27	1
Bury	2018–19	League Two	40	0	2	0	1	0	6	0	49	0
Plymouth Argyle	2019–20	League Two	25	3	2	1	2	1	1	0	30	5
Sunderland	2020–21	League One	25	1	1	0	—		8 (Note: Six appearances one goal in Football League Trophy; two appearances in League One play-offs)	1	34	2
Crewe Alexandra	2021–22	League One	10	0	0	0	2	0	3	0	15	0
Wrexham	2021–22	National League	15	0	—		—		5 (Note: Four appearances in FA Trophy; one appearance in National League play-offs)	0	20	0
Wrexham	2022–23	National League	27	0	5	0	—		0	0	32	0
Wrexham	2023–24	League Two	2	0	0	0	1	0	2	0	5	0
Wrexham	Total		44	0	5	0	1	0	7	0	57	0
Career totals			223	7	12	1	12	1	34	2	281	11

== Honours ==
Bury

- EFL League Two runner-up: 2018–19

Plymouth Argyle

- EFL League Two promotion: 2019–20

Sunderland

- EFL Trophy: 2020–21

Wrexham

- National League: 2022–23
- FA Trophy runner-up: 2021–22
- EFL League Two runner-up: 2023–24
