= Ian Sharps =

English footballer

Personal information
- Full name: Ian William Sharps
- Date of birth: 23 October 1980 (age 46)
- Place of birth: Warrington, England
- Height: 6 ft 3 in (1.91 m)
- Position: Defender

Team information
- Current team: Wolverhampton Wanderers (lead academy coach)

Senior career*
Years	Team	Apps	(Gls)
1998–2006	Tranmere Rovers	172	(6)
2006–2010	Rotherham United	160	(8)
2010–2012	Shrewsbury Town	86	(2)
2012–2013	Rotherham United	23	(1)
2013	→ Burton Albion (loan)	16	(0)
2013–2015	Burton Albion	58	(1)
2015	→ AFC Telford United (loan)	15	(0)
2015–2016	Chester	32	(0)
Total		562	(18)

Managerial career
- 2018: Walsall (caretaker)
- * Club domestic league appearances and goals

Ian William Sharps (born 23 October 1980) is an English former footballer who is the lead academy coach at Wolverhampton Wanderers. During his playing career he was a defender most commonly deployed at centre back.

== Career ==
Born in Warrington, Sharps is a tall central defender who signed for Tranmere Rovers after serving as a trainee and soon established himself as a first team regular making almost 200 appearances. Sharps joined Rotherham United on a two-year deal during the summer of 2006. Following the 2007–08 season, he signed a new two-year contract with Rotherham. Sharps played his 100th game for the Millers in their FA Cup tie away at Aldershot Town. Despite going through three points deductions, Ian has remained loyal to The Millers and has established himself as one of Rotherham's most consistent performers. Sharps got voted Rotherham United Player of the Year in 2009, resulting him being re-appointed club captain for the 2009 season. On 14 June 2010, Sharps signed for Shrewsbury Town, and was named as club captain. Over a time period of 2 seasons, he helped guide Shrewsbury to promotion from League Two in the 2011–12 season. However, despite the accolade, he was to move on, and return to his former club.

Sharps re-joined Rotherham United on 22 May 2012, with Sharps opting for the Millers and the lure of the New York Stadium, where he was appointed the captain.

On 18 January 2013, Sharps was loaned out to Burton Albion, before joining them permanently at the end of the season. Although he was a regular player for Burton at first, he fell out of favour after the departure of manager Gary Rowett to Birmingham City, and Sharps joined AFC Telford United on loan in February 2015 for the rest of the season. At the end of the season, it was announced that he would be leaving Burton at the end of his contract, and signing permanently for Telford United on a one-year deal at that point.

== Career statistics ==
As of 8 January 2024

Appearances and goals by club, season and competition
Club	Season	League			FA Cup		League Cup		Other		Total	
Club	Season	Division	Apps	Goals	Apps	Goals	Apps	Goals	Apps	Goals	Apps	Goals
Tranmere Rovers	1998–99	First Division	1	0	0	0	0	0	0	0	1	0
Tranmere Rovers	1999–00	First Division	0	0	0	0	0	0	0	0	0	0
Tranmere Rovers	2000–01	First Division	0	0	0	0	0	0	0	0	0	0
Tranmere Rovers	2001–02	Second Division	29	0	2	0	1	0	1 (Note: Appearance(s) in Football League Trophy)	0	33	0
Tranmere Rovers	2002–03	Second Division	30	3	0	0	1	0	1	0	32	3
Tranmere Rovers	2003–04	Second Division	27	1	3	0	2	0	0	0	32	1
Tranmere Rovers	2004–05	League One	46	1	1	0	2	0	2	0	51	1
Tranmere Rovers	2005–06	League One	39	1	1	0	1	1	3	0	44	2
Tranmere Rovers	Total		172	6	7	0	7	1	7	0	193	7
Rotherham United	2006–07	League One	38	2	1	0	2	1	1	0	42	3
Rotherham United	2007–08	League Two	33	2	2	0	1	0	2	1	38	3
Rotherham United	2008–09	League Two	45	4	2	0	4	0	5	1	56	5
Rotherham United	2009–10	League Two	44	0	3	0	1	0	4 (Note: One appearance in Football League Trophy, three appearances in League Two play-offs)	0	52	0
Rotherham United	Total		160	8	8	0	8	1	12	2	188	11
Shrewsbury Town	2010–11	League Two	43	1	0	0	2	0	4 (Note: Two appearances in Football League Trophy, two appearances in League Two play-offs)	0	49	1
Shrewsbury Town	2011–12	League Two	43	1	3	1	2	0	0	0	48	2
Shrewsbury Town	Total		86	2	3	1	4	0	4	0	97	3
Rotherham United	2012–13	League Two	23	1	2	0	1	0	1	0	27	1
Burton Albion (loan)	2012–13	League Two	16	0	—		—		2 (Note: Appearance(s) in League Two play-offs)	0	18	0
Burton Albion	2013–14	League Two	39	1	4	0	2	0	2 (Note: One appearance in Football League Trophy, one appearance in League Two play-offs)	0	47	1
Burton Albion	2014–15	League Two	19	0	1	0	3	0	1	0	24	0
Burton Albion	Total		74	1	5	0	5	0	5	0	89	1
AFC Telford United (loan)	2014–15	Conference Premier	15	0	—		—		0	0	15	0
Chester	2015–16	National League	32	0	1	0	—		6 (Note: Three appearances in FA Trophy, three appearances in Cheshire Senior Cup)	0	39	0
Career total			562	18	26	1	25	2	35	2	648	23

== Managerial statistics ==
As of match played 12 March 2018

Managerial record by team and tenure
Team	From	To	Record					Ref
Team	From	To	P	W	D	L	Win %	Ref
Walsall (caretaker)	12 March 2018	16 March 2018	0	0	0	0	—	
Total			0	0	0	0	—	—

== Honours ==
Burton Albion

- Football League Two: 2014–15

Individual

- PFA Team of the Year: 2009–10 League Two, 2010–11 League Two, 2011–12 League Two
