= Dominic Knowles =

English footballer

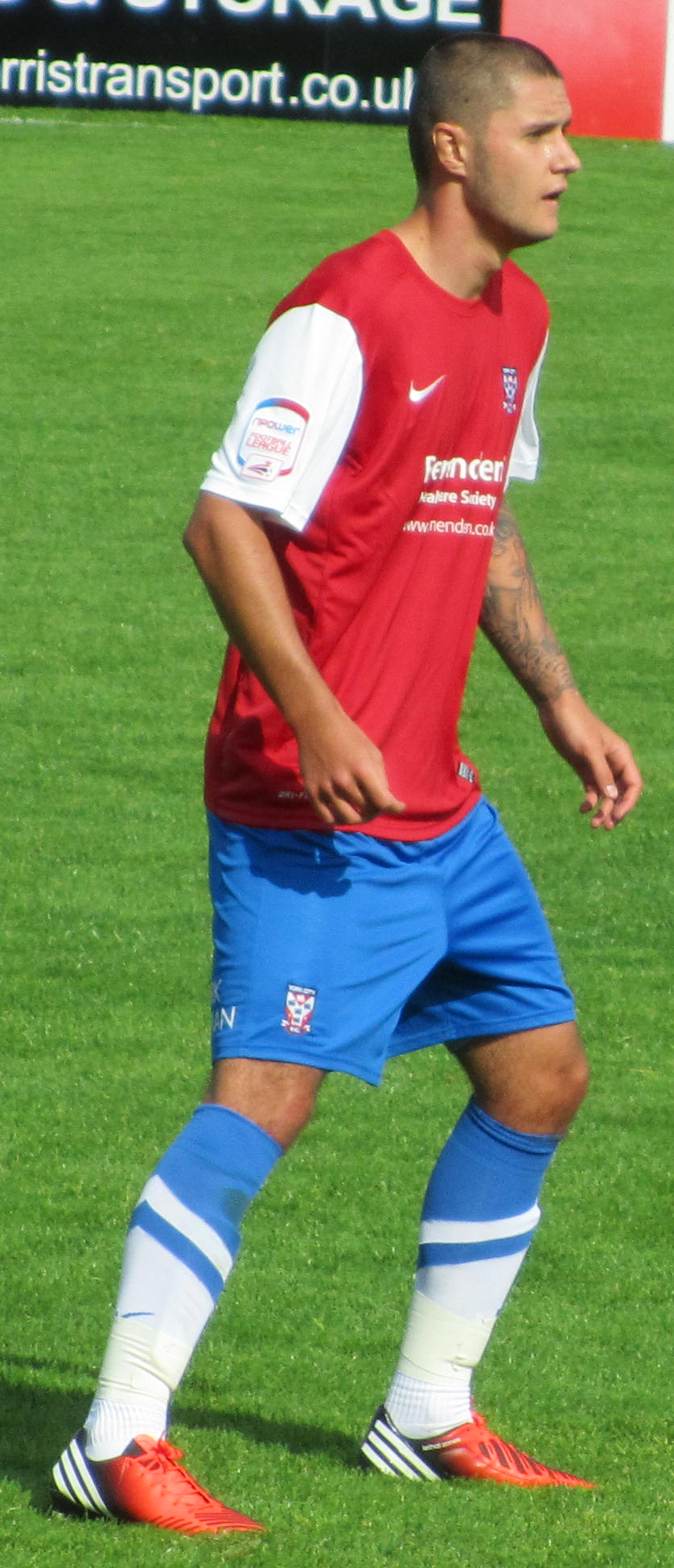
- Knowles playing for York City on trial in 2012

Personal information
- Full name: Dominic Thomas Knowles
- Date of birth: 13 February 1992 (age 34)
- Place of birth: Accrington, England
- Height: 5 ft 9 in (1.75 m)
- Position: Striker

Team information
- Current team: Curzon Ashton

Youth career
- 2008–2010: Burnley

Senior career*
| Years | Team | Apps | (Gls) |
| 2010–2012 | Burnley | 0 | (0) |
| 2012–2013 | Gainsborough Trinity | 14 | (8) |
| 2013 | Harrogate Town | 14 | (10) |
| 2013–2015 | Burton Albion | 39 | (3) |
| 2015 | → Kidderminster Harriers (loan) | 6 | (0) |
| 2015–2019 | Harrogate Town | 83 | (34) |
| 2019–2020 | Boston United | 29 | (12) |
| 2020– | Curzon Ashton | 0 | (0) |
- * Club domestic league appearances and goals as of 15:08, 11 July 2019 (UTC)

Dominic Thomas Knowles (born 13 February 1992) is an English footballer who plays for Curzon Ashton as a striker. He Retired from playing in 2022.

== Career ==
=== Burnley ===
Born in Accrington, Lancashire, Knowles started his career at Burnley in 2008, coming through the youth system, but never made a first team appearance before his release in June 2012.

=== Spells at Gainsborough Trinity and Harrogate Town ===
Knowles joined Gainsborough Trinity, after failed trials with York City and Stevenage, he went on to score 10 goals in 18 appearances before being released after an unsanctioned trial with Burton Albion.

He then joined Harrogate Town, in January 2013 scoring 10 goals in 14 games before joining Burton Albion permanently in the summer of 2013.

=== Burton Albion ===
On 18 June 2013, Knowles was awarded a permanent contract, having spent the final months of the last term at Burton.

=== Kidderminster Harriers ===
On 30 January 2015, Dominic signed for Conference playoff hopefuls Kidderminster Harriers on loan till the end of the season. On 19 March, Dominic was recalled by his parent club.

=== Harrogate Town return ===
In July 2015 after his release from Burton Albion, he rejoined Harrogate Town on a 4-year deal. Scoring a goal on his first game back in pre-season vs Gateshead.

=== Boston United ===
On 20 June 2019, Knowles joined Boston United.

=== Curzon Ashton ===
On 1 October 2020, Knowles joined Curzon Ashton.

== Career statistics ==
As of end of 2019–20 season

Appearances and goals by club, season and competition
| Club | Season | League | | | FA Cup | | League Cup | | Other | | Total | |
| Club | Season | Division | Apps | Goals | Apps | Goals | Apps | Goals | Apps | Goals | Apps | Goals |
|---|---|---|---|---|---|---|---|---|---|---|---|---|
| Burnley | 2010–11 | Championship | 0 | 0 | 0 | 0 | 0 | 0 | — | | 0 | 0 |
| Burnley | 2011–12 | Championship | 0 | 0 | 0 | 0 | 0 | 0 | — | | 0 | 0 |
| Burnley | Burnley total | | 0 | 0 | 0 | 0 | 0 | 0 | — | | 0 | 0 |
| Gainsborough Trinity | 2012–13 | Conference North | 14 | 8 | 2 | 0 | — | | 4 (Note: Appearances in the FA Trophy) | 1 | 20 | 9 |
| Harrogate Town | 2012–13 | Conference North | 14 | 10 | 0 | 0 | — | | 0 | 0 | 14 | 10 |
| Burton Albion | 2013–14 | League Two | 28 | 3 | 3 | 0 | 0 | 0 | 3 (Note: One appearance in the Football League Trophy, two in the League Two play-offs) | 0 | 34 | 3 |
| Burton Albion | 2014–15 | League Two | 11 | 0 | 1 | 0 | 3 | 1 | 1 (Note: Appearance in the Football League Trophy) | 0 | 16 | 1 |
| Burton Albion | Burton Albon total | | 39 | 3 | 4 | 0 | 3 | 1 | 4 | 0 | 50 | 4 |
| Kidderminster Harriers (loan) | 2014–15 | Conference Premier | 6 | 0 | — | | — | | 0 | 0 | 6 | 0 |
| Harrogate Town | 2015–16 | National League North | 29 | 8 | 1 | 0 | — | | 0 | 0 | 30 | 8 |
| Harrogate Town | 2016–17 | National League North | 8 | 5 | 0 | 0 | — | | 0 | 0 | 8 | 5 |
| Harrogate Town | 2017–18 | National League North | 19 | 12 | 0 | 0 | — | | 6 (Note: 4 appearances and one goal in FA Trophy, 2 appearances and four goals in National League North Play Offs) | 5 | 25 | 17 |
| Harrogate Town | 2018–19 | National League | 22 | 5 | 0 | 0 | — | | 3 (Note: 2 appearances and 1 goal in FA Trophy, one appearance in National League Playoffs) | 1 | 25 | 6 |
| Harrogate Town | Harrogate total | | 78 | 30 | 1 | 0 | 0 | 0 | 9 | 6 | 88 | 36 |
| Boston United | 2019–20 | National League North | 27 | 12 | 6 | 1 | — | | 2 (Note: Appearances in the National League North Play Offs) | 0 | 35 | 13 |
| Career total | | | 178 | 63 | 13 | 1 | 3 | 1 | 19 | 7 | 213 | 72 |
