= Jacob Blyth =

English footballer

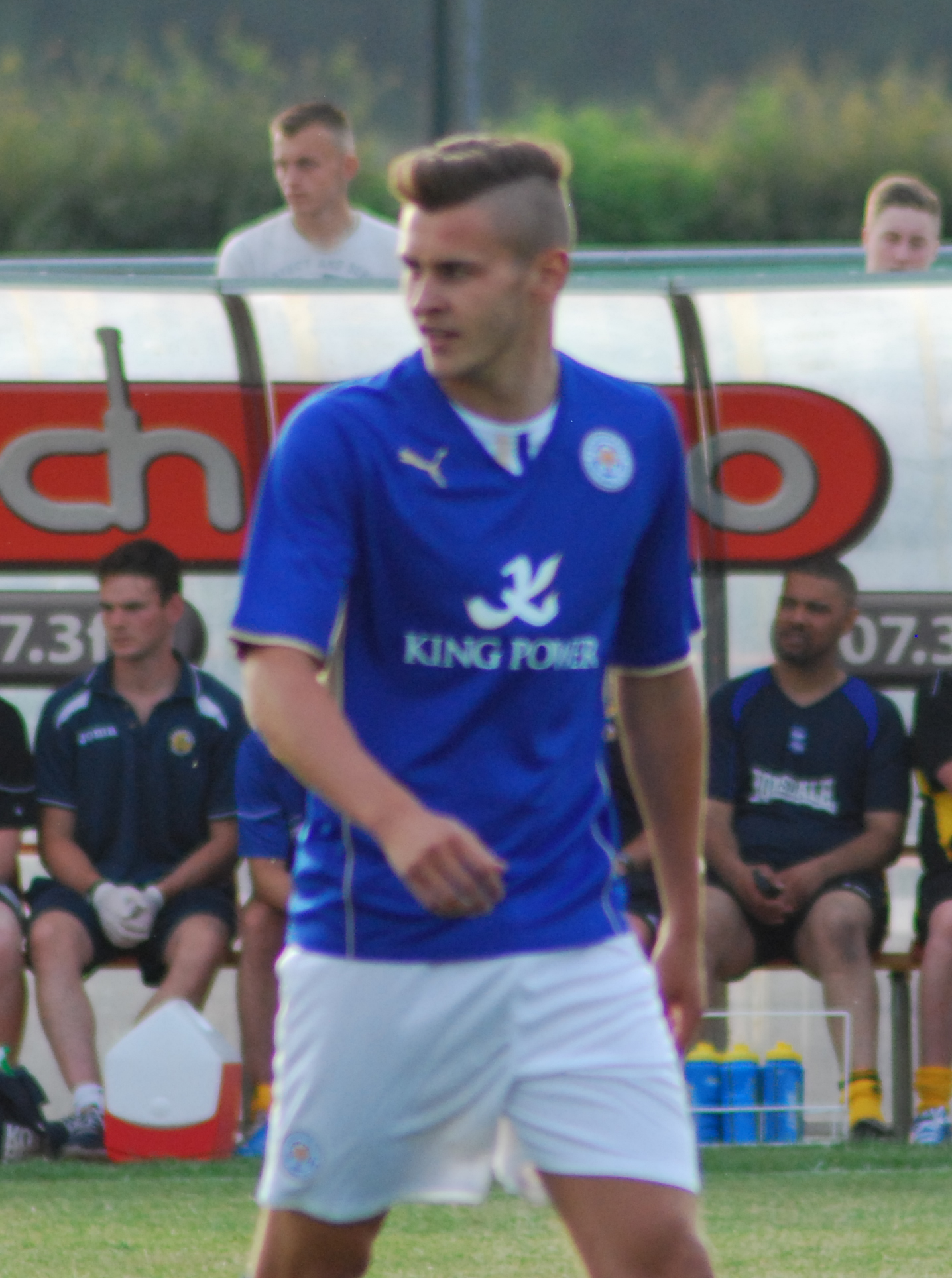
- Blyth in 2013

Personal information
- Full name: Jacob Matthew Blyth
- Date of birth: 14 August 1992 (age 34)
- Place of birth: Nuneaton, Warwickshire, England
- Height: 6 ft 3 in (1.91 m)
- Position: Forward

Team information
- Current team: Wythenshawe Town

Youth career
- Bermuda WMC

Senior career*
Years	Team	Apps	(Gls)
2009–2010	Nuneaton Griff	35	(19)
2010–2011	Bedworth United	25	(6)
2011–2012	Leamington	37	(17)
2012–2016	Leicester City	0	(0)
2012–2013	→ Burton Albion (loan)	2	(0)
2013	→ Notts County (loan)	4	(0)
2013	→ Northampton Town (loan)	7	(3)
2013	→ Northampton Town (loan)	4	(0)
2014–2015	→ Burton Albion (loan)	22	(5)
2015	→ Cambridge United (loan)	5	(1)
2016	→ Blackpool (loan)	8	(2)
2016–2017	Motherwell	8	(0)
2018–2019	Barrow	24	(3)
2019–2020	Macclesfield Town	19	(1)
2020–2021	Altrincham	3	(0)
2021	Gateshead	0	(0)
2021	Oldham Athletic	3	(0)
2021–2022	Chorley	23	(3)
2022–2023	Bradford (Park Avenue)	33	(6)
2023	→ Darlington (loan)	6	(0)
2024–	Wythenshawe Town	0	(0)
- * Club domestic league appearances and goals as of 13:40, 28 August 2024 (UTC)

Jacob Matthew Blyth (born 14 August 1992) is an English professional footballer who plays as a forward for Midland League Premier Division club Wythenshawe Town.

== Early life ==
Blyth was educated at St. Thomas More School & Technical College in his home town of Nuneaton.

== Career ==
=== Early career ===
He started his playing career at local league side Bermuda F.C. Entrance to the football league pyramid football followed when he played for Nuneaton Griff of the Midland Football Combination. Further moves up the pyramid followed when he switched to Bedworth United and then in January 2011 to Leamington of the Southern League Premier Division.

=== Leicester City ===
In May 2012 the 19-year-old forward was taken on by Leicester City of the EFL Championship on professional terms for an undisclosed fee.

==== Loan moves ====
After scoring 6 goals in 11 appearances for the club's Under 21 Development Squad he was allowed to move to Burton Albion of League Two to gain first team experience. Blyth made his Football League debut the day afterwards on 20 November 2012 as a 78th minute substitute against Aldershot Town. On 13 February 2013 he joined League One Notts County on a month's loan.

Following a successful first season playing for Leicester City Development Squad & Academy, finishing as top scorer, Blyth signed a new contract with the club on 1 May 2013.

On 9 August 2013, Blyth joined Northampton Town on a one-month loan deal. Making his debut on 10 August 2013 in a League Two game against Newport County at Sixfields, Blyth scored with a 25th-minute header, the first goal in a 3–1 win for Northampton. On 10 September, Blyth extended his stay at Northampton until November following an impressive spell scoring twice in six appearances. His loan spell was cut short by injury and he returned to Leicester on 3 October.

On 6 November 2013, Blyth re-joined Northampton Town on loan until the middle of December 2013.

Blyth extended his contract at Leicester for a further two years on 2 June 2014.

On 27 August 2014, Blyth re-joined Burton Albion on loan until January 2015. Blyth made his second Burton debut in the 1–0, League Cup, giant-killing against Premier League side Queens Park Rangers on the same day he made his switch to the Brewers. Blyth scored his first goal of his loan in the 3–1 loss to Bury on 20 September 2014.

On 21 August 2015, Blyth signed for Cambridge United on a one-month loan deal.

On 22 March 2016, Blyth joined Blackpool on loan until the end of the 2015–16 season.

=== Motherwell ===
After being released by Leicester, Blyth signed for Scottish Premiership club Motherwell on 23 June 2016, agreeing a two-year contract with the option of a third year. On 8 August 2017, Blyth left Motherwell by mutual consent.

=== Barrow ===
On 26 June 2018, Blyth became the first signing for new Barrow boss Ian Evatt. During a pre-season game against Furness Select on 7 July 2018, Blyth collided with an advertising banner and wall, causing what at the time appeared to be a broken arm, but later turned out to only be a dislocated shoulder. The match was called off at the request of Ian Evatt due to a long delay whilst waiting for an ambulance for Blyth. He scored his first two league goals for the club on 29 December 2018 in a 3–2 win against Salford City.

=== Macclesfield Town ===
On 1 July 2019, Blyth signed for League Two club Macclesfield Town on a one-year contract.

=== Altrincham ===
On 26 December 2020, Blyth signed for National League side Altrincham. He was released on 4 January 2021 after playing just three league games.

=== Gateshead ===
On 16 January 2021, Blyth signed for National League North side Gateshead on a contract until the end of the 2020–21 season.

=== Oldham Athletic ===
In August 2021 he signed for Oldham Athletic on a short-term deal. He was released later that month after failing to impress in the three games he played.

=== Chorley ===
In September 2021, Blyth joined National League North club Chorley.

=== Bradford (Park Avenue) ===
On 29 June 2022, Blyth signed for fellow National League North club Bradford (Park Avenue) on a one-year deal. On 24 March 2023, he joined divisional rivals Darlington on loan for the remainder of the season, during which he made six league appearances without scoring.

=== Wythenshawe Town ===
In August 2024, Blyth signed for Northern Premier League Division One West club Wythenshawe Town.

== Personal life ==
Blyth is married to Geordie Shore star Holly Hagan. In January 2023 the couple announced they were expecting their first child. In June 2023, they welcomed their first son. In November 2025, the couple announced they were expecting another child. In June 2026, they welcomed their second child, a girl.

== Honours ==
Burton Albion

- Football League Two: 2014–15
