= Robbie Weir =

Northern Irish footballer (born 1988)

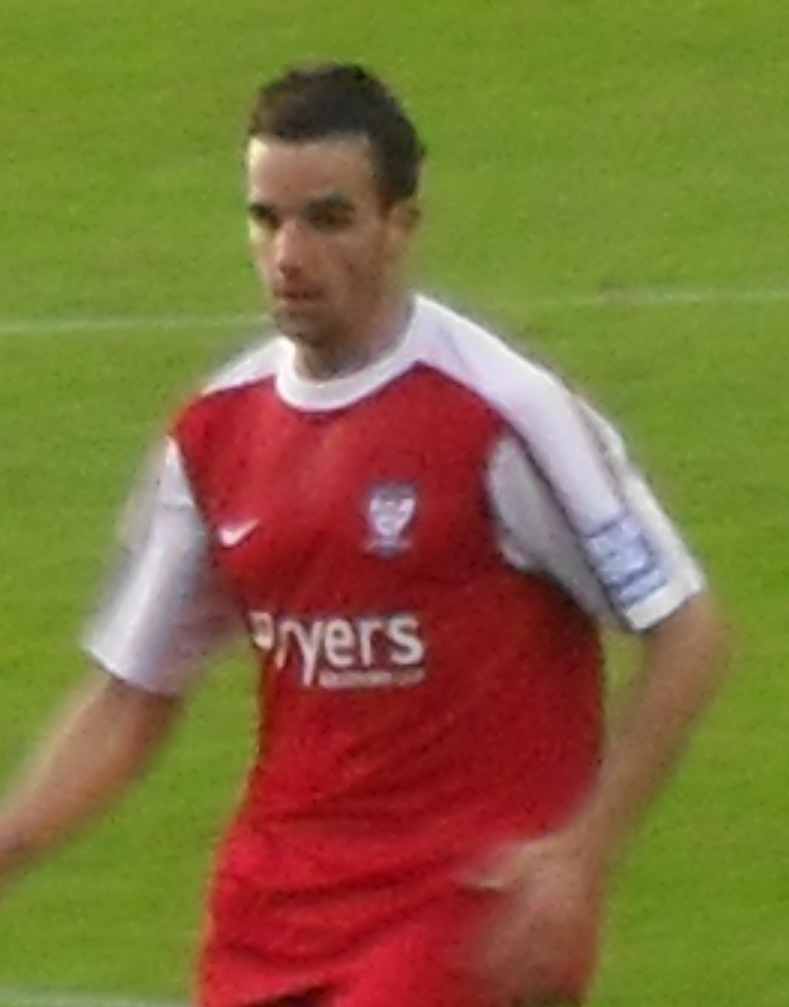
- Weir playing for York City in 2010

Personal information
- Full name: Robert James Weir
- Date of birth: 9 December 1988 (age 37)
- Place of birth: Belfast, Northern Ireland
- Height: 5 ft 9 in (1.75 m)
- Position: Central midfielder

Team information
- Current team: Crusaders
- Number: 6

Youth career
- –2004: Larne

Senior career*
Years	Team	Apps	(Gls)
2004–2005	Larne		
2005–2011	Sunderland	0	(0)
2010–2011	→ York City (loan)	5	(0)
2011	→ Tranmere Rovers (loan)	18	(0)
2011–2012	Tranmere Rovers	39	(3)
2012–2016	Burton Albion	160	(7)
2016–2017	Leyton Orient	17	(0)
2017–2020	Chesterfield	92	(2)
2020	Waterford	14	(0)
2021–	Crusaders	147	(0)

International career
- Northern Ireland U18
- Northern Ireland U19
2009–2010	Northern Ireland U21	7	(0)
2009	Northern Ireland B	1	(0)
- * Club domestic league appearances and goals as of 26 April 2026

Robert James Weir (born 9 December 1988) is a Northern Irish professional footballer who plays as a central midfielder for Crusaders. He has played in the English Football League for Tranmere Rovers, Burton Albion and Leyton Orient and Chesterfield.

== Club career ==
=== Larne ===
Born in Belfast, Weir started his career with the Larne youth system. He started playing for the first team in the 2004–05 season as a 15-year-old and he scored his first goal in a 5–2 victory over Crusaders on 9 October 2004. He had unsuccessful trials with Fulham, Stoke City and Rangers, although Larne manager Jimmy McGeough criticised these, saying "I'm not sure it proves anything. He's a great prospect and one who'll learn his trade in senior football here". Weir agreed to sign for Championship club Sunderland in February 2005. He finished the season with two Irish Premier League goals and played in the 2005 Irish Cup Final, which Larne lost 5–1 to Portadown, and was named the Northern Ireland Football Writers' Association Young Player of the Year.

=== Sunderland ===
Weir played for Sunderland in their youth team and was part of the team that reached the Premier Academy League Final in May 2007, where they were beaten 4–1 by Leicester City in a penalty shoot-out. He joined Conference Premier club York City on 12 November 2010 on a one-month loan following a trial. He made his debut in a 1–1 draw with Wrexham on 14 November 2010 and after impressing manager Gary Mills the loan was extended until 10 January 2011 in December. He finished the loan with eight appearances.

=== Tranmere Rovers ===
Weir signed for League One club Tranmere Rovers on loan until the end of 2010–11 on 14 February 2011. He made his debut in a 2–1 defeat away to Peterborough United as a 75th-minute substitute on 19 February. At the end of the 2010–11, Weir was released by Sunderland.

In May 2011, he was offered a contract by Tranmere and subsequently agreed to sign for the club permanently. He signed for the club on 29 June 2011 on a one-year contract. His first goal for the club came on the first day of 2011–12, in a 1–0 home win against Chesterfield. He was released at the end of 2011–12.

=== Burton Albion ===
On 31 May 2012, Weir signed a two-year contract with League Two club Burton Albion. He was released by Burton at the end of 2015–16.

=== Leyton Orient ===
On 6 June 2016, Weir signed for League Two club Leyton Orient on a two-year contract. He was ruled out for the rest of 2016–17 in January 2017, after sustaining an anterior cruciate ligament injury. At the end of the season, Weir exercised a clause in his contract to leave the Orient after relegation.

=== Chesterfield ===
Weir signed for League Two club Chesterfield on 3 August 2017 on an undisclosed-length contract. Weir signed a new contract with the club in May 2019.

=== Waterford ===
On 31 July 2020 Weir returned to Ireland and signed for Waterford, now managed by his former Chesterfield boss John Sheridan.

=== Crusaders ===
On 21 November 2020, following the conclusion of the 2020 League of Ireland season, it was announced that Weir had signed a pre-contract with NIFL Premiership side Crusaders, to take effect from January 2021.

== International career ==
Weir was part of the Northern Ireland national under-18 team in March 2005 and was capped during a week-long visit to the Canary Islands in February 2006. He was named captain of the under-19 team in October 2006 and led the team out in a 4–2 defeat to Belgium. In July 2007, he was called up for the 2007 Milk Cup and started as the team were beaten 4–1 by Israel in August. He was named in the under-21 team in February 2008 to play Israel as a replacement for Dermot McCaffrey. Weir was capped seven times by the under-21s from 2009 to 2010. He was capped once by the Northern Ireland B team in 2009.

== Career statistics ==
As of match played 7 May 2023

Appearances and goals by club, season and competition
Club	Season	League			FA Cup		League Cup		Other		Total	
Club	Season	Division	Apps	Goals	Apps	Goals	Apps	Goals	Apps	Goals	Apps	Goals
Sunderland	2010–11	Premier League	0	0	—		0	0	—		0	0
York City (loan)	2010–11	Conference Premier	5	0	2	0	—		1 (Note: Appearance in FA Trophy)	0	8	0
Tranmere Rovers (loan)	2010–11	League One	18	0	—		—		—		18	0
Tranmere Rovers	2011–12	League One	39	3	1	0	1	0	3 (Note: Appearance(s) in Football League Trophy)	0	44	3
Tranmere Rovers	Total		57	3	1	0	1	0	3	0	62	3
Burton Albion	2012–13	League Two	42	5	4	0	3	1	2 (Note: Appearances in League Two play-offs)	1	51	7
Burton Albion	2013–14	League Two	41	2	3	0	2	0	4 (Note: One appearance in Football League Trophy, three in League Two play-offs)	0	50	2
Burton Albion	2014–15	League Two	41	0	1	0	3	0	0	0	45	0
Burton Albion	2015–16	League One	36	0	0	0	1	0	1	0	38	0
Burton Albion	Total		160	7	8	0	9	1	7	1	184	9
Leyton Orient	2016–17	League Two	17	0	1	0	1	0	2 (Note: Appearances in EFL Trophy)	0	21	0
Chesterfield	2017–18	League Two	41	2	0	0	0	0	3	0	44	2
Chesterfield	2018–19	National League	32	0	0	0	—		1	0	33	0
Chesterfield	2019–20	National League	19	0	0	0	—		1	0	20	0
Chesterfield	Total		92	2	0	0	0	0	5	0	97	2
Waterford	2020	LOI Premier Division	14	0	1	0	—		—		15	0
Crusaders	2020–21	NIFL Premiership	17	0	1	0	0	0	0	0	18	0
Crusaders	2021–22	NIFL Premiership	31	0	5	0	1	0	2	0	39	0
Crusaders	2022–23	NIFL Premiership	27	0	4	0	1	0	5	0	37	0
Crusaders	Total		75	0	10	0	2	0	7	0	94	0
Career total			420	12	23	0	13	1	25	1	481	14

== Honours ==
Burton Albion

- Football League Two: 2014–15
- Football League One runner-up: 2015–16

Crusaders

- Irish Cup: 2021–22, 2022–23
- NIFL Charity Shield: 2022
