= Adam McGurk =

Northern Irish footballer

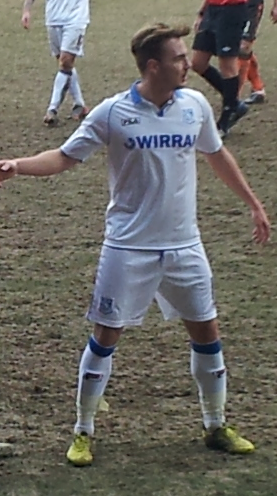
- McGurk playing for Tranmere Rovers in 2013

Personal information
- Full name: Adam Michael McGurk
- Date of birth: 24 January 1989 (age 37)
- Place of birth: Larne, Northern Ireland
- Height: 1.80 m (5 ft 11 in)
- Position: Forward

Team information
- Current team: Coleshill Town

Youth career
- 2004–2010: Aston Villa

Senior career*
Years	Team	Apps	(Gls)
2010	Hednesford Town	12	(3)
2010–2013	Tranmere Rovers	79	(10)
2013–2015	Burton Albion	71	(15)
2015–2016	Portsmouth	27	(2)
2016–2017	Cambridge United	15	(0)
2017–2018	Morecambe	34	(5)
2018	Nuneaton Borough	13	(2)
2019	Chorley	11	(0)
2019–2020	Coalville Town	21	(7)
2021	Stratford Town	4	(0)
2021–2022	Walsall Wood		
2025–	Coleshill Town	0	(0)

International career
2009	Northern Ireland U21	1	(0)
- * Club domestic league appearances and goals as of 17:21, 31 July 2025 (UTC)

Adam Michael McGurk (born 24 January 1989) is a Northern Irish professional footballer who plays as a forward for Northern Premier League Division One Midlands club Coleshill Town.

McGurk started his career in the Aston Villa youth academy in 2004, but failed to break into the first team, and joined Hednesford Town on a free transfer in March 2010. Having made twelve appearances for Hednesford, he signed for Tranmere Rovers in August 2010, making 79 league appearances in three years, before being released by the club in July 2013. He joined Morecambe on a free transfer on 31 August 2017.

== Career ==
=== Aston Villa ===
Born in Moneymore, Northern Ireland, McGurk was signed by Aston Villa in 2004 from Larne Youth. He was impressive for Aston Villa Reserves in the 2006–07 season, making seven appearances (four of which were from the substitutes bench) and scoring four goals. He suffered a serious knee injury and was out injured for a long time period. After making his comeback he struggled to force his way back into the Aston Villa Reserves and become a regular again. He was released by Villa in early 2010, and briefly retired from professional football.

=== Hednesford Town ===
After being released by Aston Villa, he went on trial with Cheltenham Town, but was not offered a contract. He joined Hednesford Town on 11 March 2010. His debut for the club came on 23 March when he played against Truro City in a Southern Football League Premier Division match.

=== Tranmere Rovers ===
He then made a couple of trial appearances for Tranmere Rovers during the summer and trained with the squad. He was then given a second chance with the club after he was signed on non-contract basis so he would be named on the substitute's bench for a League Cup first round match against Walsall in August. He made his debut for Rovers on 21 August 2010 in the Football League One clash with Bournemouth which ended in a 3–0 home defeat at Prenton Park, coming on as a second-half substitute for Ian Thomas-Moore. Three days later he signed a one-year contract with Tranmere. He went on to score his first goal for Tranmere in the reverse fixture against Bournemouth on 9 April 2011, scoring a 94th-minute winner. At the end of the 2010–11 season he offered a new contract by the club which he signed in late May, keeping him at Tranmere until summer 2012. The club took up a further one year option on him for the 2012–13 season. McGurk suffered a collapsed lung in February 2013, having also injured his hamstring that month. He was released by Tranmere at the end of the season, along with four other players. On 20 July 2013, McGurk scored a goal whilst on trial with Championship side Birmingham City, in a 1–1 draw with Oxford United.

=== Burton Albion ===
McGurk signed a two-year contract with Burton Albion on 5 August 2013. He was given the number 20 shirt and made his debut in the league cup tie against Sheffield United. He set up Chris Hussey's first goal in a 2–1 win. McGurk scored the winning goal in Burton's 1–0 win over Premier League team QPR on 28 August 2014.

=== Portsmouth ===
McGurk signed a two-year deal with Portsmouth on 24 June 2015, and went on to score on his debut against Derby County in the League Cup First Round on 12 August. He also netted once during the 3–1 victory at Fratton Park against Barnet.

=== Cambridge United ===
On 22 July 2016, McGurk signed a two-year deal with League Two side Cambridge United for an undisclosed fee.

=== Morecambe ===
On 31 August 2017, McGurk signed with League Two side Morecambe on a free transfer.

He was released by Morecambe at the end of the 2017–18 season.

=== Non-League ===
Adam signed with Nuneaton Borough in the Conference North Division.

After leaving Nuneaton, Adam signed with Chorley on 12 January 2019.

On 22 June 2019, Adam joined Coalville Town on a 1-year contract.

On 12 November 2021 he signed for Southern Football League Premier Division Central side Stratford Town. At the end of 2021, McGurk moved to Northern Premier League club Walsall Wood.

In July 2025, after over three years since he last played football, McGurk joined Northern Premier League Division One Midlands club Coleshill Town.

== International career ==
McGurk has U16 and U17 caps and has also represented Northern Ireland at U21 level, making his debut on 11 August 2009 against Portugal. He was called up to the senior squad in early 2013 for pre-World Cup qualifying friendly matches, but has yet to make his debut.

== Career statistics ==
As of match played 2 September 2017

Appearances and goals by club, season and competition
Club	Season	League			FA Cup		League Cup		Other		Total	
Club	Season	Division	Apps	Goals	Apps	Goals	Apps	Goals	Apps	Goals	Apps	Goals
Tranmere Rovers	2010–11	League One	21	3	0	0	1	0	2 (Note: Appearances in Football League Trophy)	0	24	3
Tranmere Rovers	2011–12	League One	31	4	1	0	1	0	2	1	35	5
Tranmere Rovers	2012–13	League One	27	3	2	1	0	0	1	0	30	4
Tranmere Rovers	Total		79	10	3	1	2	0	5	1	89	12
Burton Albion	2013–14	League Two	34	9	3	1	1	0	4 (Note: One appearance in Football League Trophy and three in League Two play-offs)	2	42	12
Burton Albion	2014–15	League One	37	6	1	0	3	1	0	0	41	7
Burton Albion	Total		71	15	4	1	4	1	4	2	83	19
Portsmouth	2015–16	League Two	27	2	4	3	2	1	3 (Note: One appearance in Football League Trophy and two in League Two play-offs)	0	36	6
Cambridge United	2016–17	League Two	15	0	0	0	0	0	0	0	15	0
Morecambe	2017–18	League Two	2	1	0	0	0	0	0	0	2	1
Career total			194	28	11	5	8	2	12	3	225	38

== Honours ==
Burton Albion

- Football League Two: 2014–15
