= 2012–13 Rochdale A.F.C. season =

English football club season

Rochdale A.F.C.
2012–13 season
- Chairman: Chris Dunphy
- Manager: John Coleman (until 21 January 2013); Keith Hill (from 22 January 2013)
- Stadium: Spotland Stadium; Rochdale, Greater Manchester
- Football League Two: 12th
- FA Cup: First round proper
- Football League Cup: First round
- Football League Trophy: Second round Northern section
- Top goalscorer: League: Bobby Grant (15); All: Bobby Grant (16)
- Highest home attendance: 3,461 vs Bradford City (2 October 2012); Football League Two
- Lowest home attendance: 1,256 vs Fleetwood Town (4 September 2012); Football League Trophy
- Average home league attendance: 2,269
Home colours	Away colours

The 2012–13 season was Rochdale A.F.C.'s 106th in existence and their first back in League Two, following a two-season stint in League One which ended with a last-place finish in 2011–12. Rochdale began their 2012–13 Football League Two season with a 0–0 draw against Northampton. They entered into three cup competitions in the first round due to the league table they were in. John Coleman's and Jimmy Bell's contracts were terminated by Rochdale on 21 January 2013 following a poor run in form.

== Squad ==
Note: Flags indicate national team as defined under FIFA eligibility rules; some limited exceptions apply. Players may hold more than one non-FIFA nationality.

No.	Pos.	Nation	Player
1	GK	ENG	Josh Lillis
2	DF	IRL	Joseph Rafferty
3	DF	ENG	Rhys Bennett
4	DF	ENG	Peter Cavanagh (captain)
5	DF	AUS	Shane Cansdell-Sherriff
6	MF	IRL	Brian Barry-Murphy
7	MF	ENG	Jason Kennedy
8	MF	ENG	Andrew Tutte
9	FW	ENG	George Donnelly
10	FW	ENG	Reece Gray
11	FW	ENG	Ashley Grimes
12	DF	ENG	Phil Edwards
13	GK	ENG	Steve Collis
14	DF	ENG	Kevin McIntyre
16	DF	ENG	Sam Minihan
17	MF	ENG	Luke Watson (On Loan to Droylden FC)

No.	Pos.	Nation	Player
21	GK	ENG	Matty Edwards
22	FW	ENG	Bobby Grant
23	MF	ENG	Andy Haworth
25	DF	ENG	Michael Rose
26	MF	ENG	Joel Logan
27	FW	ENG	Terry Gornell
30	MF	ENG	Jamie Allen
32	MF	NIR	Callum Camps
33	DF	ENG	D'Arcy O'Connor
34	MF	ENG	Scott Tanser
39	FW	ENG	Joe Bunney
40	FW	ENG	Ian Henderson
42	GK	ENG	Josh Gregory
-	MF	FRA	Bastien Héry
-	MF	Jersey	Peter Vincenti
-	MF	ENG	Scott Hogan

=== Statistics ===
No.	Pos	Nat	Player	Total		League Two		FA Cup		League Cup		League Trophy	
No.	Pos	Nat	Player	Apps	Goals	Apps	Goals	Apps	Goals	Apps	Goals	Apps	Goals
1	GK	(England) ENG	Josh Lillis	49	0	46 + 0	0	2 + 0	0	1 + 0	0	0 + 0	0
2	DF	(Republic of Ireland) IRL	Joe Rafferty	23	0	20 + 1	0	0 + 0	0	0 + 0	0	1 + 1	0
3	DF	(England) ENG	Rhys Bennett	37	2	31 + 2	2	2 + 0	0	0 + 0	0	2 + 0	0
4	MF	(England) ENG	Peter Cavanagh	35	1	30 + 1	1	2 + 0	0	1 + 0	0	1 + 0	0
5	DF	(Australia) AUS	Shane Cansdell-Sherriff	17	0	16 + 1	0	0 + 0	0	0 + 0	0	0 + 0	0
5	DF	(England) ENG	Ryan Edwards	29	0	25 + 1	0	1 + 0	0	1 + 0	0	1 + 0	0
6	MF	(Republic of Ireland) IRL	Brian Barry-Murphy	9	0	6 + 2	0	0 + 0	0	0 + 0	0	1 + 0	0
7	MF	(England) ENG	Jason Kennedy	49	7	44 + 2	4	2 + 0	1	1 + 0	2	0 + 0	0
8	MF	(England) ENG	Andrew Tutte	42	8	37 + 0	7	2 + 0	0	1 + 0	1	1 + 1	0
9	FW	(England) ENG	George Donnelly	48	8	26 + 17	8	2 + 0	0	1 + 0	0	2 + 0	0
10	MF	(England) ENG	Reece Gray	2	0	1 + 1	0	0 + 0	0	0 + 0	0	0 + 0	0
11	FW	(England) ENG	Ashley Grimes	41	11	27 + 11	10	1 + 0	0	1 + 0	0	1 + 0	1
12	DF	(England) ENG	Phil Edwards	12	0	11 + 0	0	0 + 0	0	1 + 0	0	0 + 0	0
13	GK	(England) ENG	Steve Collis	0	0	0 + 0	0	0 + 0	0	0 + 0	0	0 + 0	0
13	MF	(England) ENG	Ray Putterill	22	2	1 + 17	1	0 + 1	0	0 + 1	0	2 + 0	1
14	DF	(England) ENG	Kevin McIntyre	43	1	37 + 1	1	2 + 0	0	1 + 0	0	2 + 0	0
15	FW	(Nigeria) NGR	Dele Adebola	29	6	22 + 4	6	2 + 0	0	1 + 0	0	0 + 0	0
16	DF	(England) ENG	Sam Minihan	0	0	0 + 0	0	0 + 0	0	0 + 0	0	0 + 0	0
17	MF	(England) ENG	Luke Watson	0	0	0 + 0	0	0 + 0	0	0 + 0	0	0 + 0	0
18	FW	(Nigeria) NGR	Godwin Abadaki	0	0	0 + 0	0	0 + 0	0	0 + 0	0	0 + 0	0
19	DF	(England) ENG	Matthew Pearson	13	0	8 + 1	0	1 + 0	0	1 + 0	0	1 + 1	0
20	FW	(England) ENG	Craig Curran	6	0	0 + 4	0	0 + 0	0	0 + 1	0	1 + 0	0
21	GK	(Scotland) SCO	Matty Edwards	37	0	32 + 1	0	2 + 0	0	0 + 0	0	2 + 0	0
22	MF	(England) ENG	Robert Grant	38	16	35 + 1	15	1 + 0	0	0 + 0	0	1 + 0	1
23	MF	(England) ENG	Ian Craney	9	0	0 + 6	0	0 + 1	0	0 + 1	0	1 + 0	0
23	MF	(England) ENG	Andy Haworth	7	0	3 + 4	0	0 + 0	0	0 + 0	0	0 + 0	0
24	DF	(Republic of Ireland) IRL	Neill Byrne	1	0	0 + 0	0	0 + 1	0	0 + 0	0	0 + 0	0
25	DF	(England) ENG	Michael Rose	14	2	10 + 4	2	0 + 0	0	0 + 0	0	0 + 0	0
26	MF	(England) ENG	Joel Logan	5	0	0 + 5	0	0 + 0	0	0 + 0	0	0 + 0	0
27	FW	(England) ENG	Terry Gornell	19	5	16 + 3	5	0 + 0	0	0 + 0	0	0 + 0	0
28	MF	(England) ENG	Ritchie Jones	3	0	2 + 1	0	0 + 0	0	0 + 0	0	0 + 0	0
29	MF	(England) ENG	Joe Thompson	7	0	5 + 2	0	0 + 0	0	0 + 0	0	0 + 0	0
30	MF	(England) ENG	Jamie Allen	0	0	0 + 0	0	0 + 0	0	0 + 0	0	0 + 0	0
31	GK	(England) ENG	Ben Smith	2	0	0 + 0	0	0 + 0	0	0 + 0	0	2 + 0	0
32	MF	(Northern Ireland) NIR	Callum Camps	2	0	0 + 2	0	0 + 0	0	0 + 0	0	0 + 0	0
33	DF	(England) ENG	Darcy O'Connor	1	0	1 + 0	0	0 + 0	0	0 + 0	0	0 + 0	0
34	DF	(England) ENG	Scott Tanser	1	0	0 + 1	0	0 + 0	0	0 + 0	0	0 + 0	0
37	DF	(England) ENG	Wayne Thomas	2	0	2 + 0	0	0 + 0	0	0 + 0	0	0 + 0	0
39	DF	(England) ENG	Joe Bunney	1	1	0 + 1	1	0 + 0	0	0 + 0	0	0 + 0	0
40	FW	(England) ENG	Ian Henderson	12	3	12 + 0	3	0 + 0	0	0 + 0	0	0 + 0	0

== Friendlies ==
11 July 2012	Radcliffe Borough	2–1	Rochdale	Stainton Park
BST				Attendance: 400

25 July 2012	Rochdale	1–0	Blackburn Rovers	Spotland Stadium
BST	Thompson	Report

28 July 2012	Rochdale	0–1	Hull City	Rochdale
BST			Koren 23'	Stadium: Spotland Stadium

31 July 2012	Marine	0–1	Rochdale	Arriva Stadium
BST

4 August 2012	Southport	3–1	Rochdale	Merseyrail Community Stadium
BST		Report

7 August 2012	Rochdale	3–1	Burnley	Rochdale
19:30 BST		Report		Stadium: Spotland Stadium

13 August 2012	Ashton United	0–1	Rochdale	Ashton-under-Lyne
BST		Report		Stadium: Hurst Cross

Last updated: 12 June 2013

== Football League Two ==
=== League table ===
Pos	Team	Pld	W	D	L	GF	GA	GD	Pts
10	Exeter City	46	18	10	18	63	62	+1	64
11	Southend United	46	16	13	17	61	55	+6	61
12	Rochdale	46	16	13	17	68	70	−2	61
13	Fleetwood Town	46	15	15	16	55	57	−2	60
14	Bristol Rovers	46	16	12	18	60	69	−9	60

Updated to match(es) played on 27 April 2013. Source: BBC Sport
Rules for classification: 1) Points; 2) Goal difference; 3) Number of goals scored

=== Fixtures ===
18 August 2012 1	Rochdale	0–0	Northampton Town	Rochdale
15:00 BST	P. Edwards (yellow card) 67'	Report; Report	Hackett (yellow card) 90'	Stadium: Spotland Stadium; Attendance: 2,558; Referee: Tony Harrington

21 August 2012 2	Chesterfield	1–1	Rochdale	Chesterfield
19:45 BST	Randall (yellow card) 35'; Talbot (yellow card) 38'; Lester 90+4'	Report; Report	McIntyre (yellow card) 39'; Tutte (yellow card) 35' (goal) 49'	Stadium: Proact Stadium; Attendance: 4,595; Referee: Richard Clark

25 August 2012 3	Torquay United	4–2	Rochdale	Torquay
15:00 BST	Bodin 12'; Downes 34' (red card) 74'; Howe 60', 68' (yellow card) 73'	Report	Tutte 8'; R. Edwards (yellow card) 45+1'; Pearson (yellow card) 73'; Putterill 85'; McIntyre (yellow card) 90+4'	Stadium: Plainmoor; Attendance: 2,731; Referee: Gavin Ward

1 September 2012 4	Rochdale	2–0	Barnet	Rochdale
15:00 BST	R. Edwards (yellow card) 8'; Grimes 17'; Adebola 34'	Report		Stadium: Spotland Stadium; Attendance: 2,021; Referee: David Webb

8 September 2012 5	Rochdale	0–1	Burton Albion	Rochdale
15:00 BST	Cavanagh (yellow card) 69'	Report	Paterson 52'	Stadium: Spotland Stadium; Attendance: 2,199; Referee: Andy Haines

15 September 2012 6	AFC Wimbledon	1–2	Rochdale	Kingston upon Thames
15:00 BST	Midson (red card) 24'; Haynes-Brown (yellow card) 76'; Moore 80' (yellow card) 89'	Report	Adebola 10'; Grimes (yellow card) 35'; Grant 39'; Tutte (yellow card) 64'	Stadium: Kingsmeadow; Attendance: 3,529; Referee: Brendan Malone

18 September 2012 7	Rotherham United	2–3	Rochdale	Rotherham
19:45 BST	Revell 59'; Nardiello 65'; Hunt (yellow card) 71'	Report	P. Edwards (yellow card) 29'; Adebola 45'; Grant 75' (pen.); McIntyre 79'	Stadium: New York Stadium; Attendance: 6,683; Referee: Steve Martin

22 September 2012 8	Rochdale	2–2	Dagenham & Redbridge	Rochdale
15:00 BST	Adebola 33'; Grant 36'; McIntyre (red card) 60'; Donnelly (yellow card) 82'	Report	Spillane 60' (pen.) (yellow card) 90+5'; Williams 68'	Stadium: Spotland Stadium; Attendance: 2,120; Referee: Dean Mohareb

29 September 2012 9	Gillingham	1–2	Rochdale	Gillingham
15:00 BST	Martin (yellow card) 27'; Burton (yellow card) 33'; Jackman (red card) 33'; Kedwell 74' (pen.)	Report	Tutte 15'; Bennett (yellow card) 22'; Grant 59' (yellow card) 90'; Lillis (yellow card) 65'; Donnelly (yellow card) 86'	Stadium: Priestfield Stadium; Attendance: 5,874; Referee: David Phillips

2 October 2012 10	Rochdale	0–0	Bradford City	Rochdale
15:00 BST	Grant (red card) 34'; Rafferty (yellow card) 59'	Report; Report	Hines (yellow card) 40'	Stadium: Spotland Stadium; Attendance: 3,461; Referee: James Adcock

6 October 2012 11	Accrington Stanley	2–3	Rochdale	Accrington
15:00 BST	Mingoia 37'; Boco 47'	Report; Report	Donnelly 73'; Grimes 32' (pen.); Kennedy 83'	Stadium: Crown Ground; Attendance: 2,678; Referee: Chris Foy

13 October 2012 12	Rochdale	1–2	Morecambe	Rochdale
15:00 BST	Donnelly 73'; Tutte (yellow card) 90+3'	Report; Report	Redshaw 10', 66'; Fleming (yellow card) 20'	Stadium: Spotland Stadium; Attendance: 2,493; Referee: Nigel Miller

20 October 2012 13	Plymouth Argyle	3–1	Rochdale	Plymouth
15:00 BST	Guy Madjo 4' (pen.), 90+3' (pen.); Gurrieri 7'; Griffiths (yellow card) 29'; Hourihane (yellow card) 87'; MacDonald (yellow card) 89'	Report; Report	Adebola 76'; P. Edwards (yellow card) 84'	Stadium: Home Park; Attendance: 2,493; Referee: Gary Sutton

23 October 2012 14	Rochdale	2–0	Oxford United	Rochdale
19:45 BST	Cavanagh (yellow card) 38'; Donnelly 78'; Grant 87'	Report; Report	Raynes (yellow card) 43'; Potter (yellow card) 55'	Stadium: Spotland Stadium; Attendance: 1,619; Referee: Trevor Kettle

27 October 2012 15	Rochdale	0–0	Fleetwood Town	Rochdale
15:00 BST	Bennett (yellow card) 74'	Report; Report	Barkhuizen (yellow card) 24'; Marrow (yellow card) 55' (yellow-red card) 62'; Obeng (yellow card) 81'	Stadium: Spotland Stadium; Attendance: 2,372; Referee: Mark Brown

6 November 2012 16	Port Vale	2–2	Rochdale	Stoke-on-Trent
19:45 GMT	Pope 27', 62' (yellow card) 89'; Morsy (red card) 67'	Report; Report	McIntyre (yellow card) 31'; Grant 73' (yellow card) 80'; Tutte 87'; P. Edwards (yellow card) 90+4'	Stadium: Vale Park; Attendance: 4,139; Referee: Andy Woolmer

10 November 2012 17	Wycombe Wanderers	1–2	Rochdale	High Wycombe
15:00 GMT	J. Grant 25'; Lewis (yellow card) 40'; Scowen (yellow card) 45'	Report; Report	Grimes 5'; Grant (yellow card) 56' (goal) 90+2'; Rafferty (yellow card) 63'; R. Edwards (yellow card) 85'	Stadium: Adams Park; Attendance: 3,020; Referee: Keith Stroud

17 November 2012 18	Rochdale	2–1	Bristol Rovers	Rochdale
15:00 GMT	Tutte 27'; Grant 59'	Report; Report	Clarkson 14' (pen.); Anyinsah (yellow card) 45'; Kenneth (yellow card) 28' (yellow-red card) 71'; Clucas (yellow card) 85'; Richards (red card) 90+4'	Stadium: Spotland Stadium; Attendance: 2,204; Referee: Scott Duncan

24 November 2012 19	Southend United	3–1	Rochdale	Southend
15:00 GMT	Assombalonga 57'; Tomlin 59'; Laird (yellow card) 61' (goal) 77'	Report; Report	Adebola (yellow card) 42'; Gornell 50'; Bennett (yellow card) 68'	Stadium: Roots Hall Stadium; Attendance: 5,216; Referee: Carl Berry

1 December 2012 20	Rochdale	2–3	York City	Rochdale
15:00 GMT	McIntyre (yellow card) 43'; Bennett 61'; Grant 83' (pen.); Donnelly (yellow card) 90+3'	Report; Report	Potts 7', 35'; Walker 19'; Smith (yellow card) 80'	Stadium: Spotland Stadium; Attendance: 2,411; Referee: Oliver Langford

8 December 2012 21	Rochdale	2–3	Exeter City	Rochdale
15:00 GMT	R. Edwards (yellow card) 19'; Grant (yellow card) 22'; Rafferty (yellow card) 23'; Kennedy (yellow card) 87'; Gornell 65', 90' (red card) 90+4'	Report; Report	Baldwin 24'; O'Flynn 27', 38'	Stadium: Spotland Stadium; Attendance: 1,796; Referee: Jeremy Simpson

15 December 2012 22	Aldershot Town	4–2	Rochdale	Aldershot
15:00 GMT	López 8'; Vincenti (yellow card) 35' (goal) 39'; Rose 45' (pen.); Reid 90'; Bergqvist (yellow card) 90+1'; Brown (yellow card) 90+5'; Herd (red card) 90+5'	Report	Grimes 12', 60'; Putterill (yellow card) 90+6'	Stadium: EBB Stadium; Attendance: 1,910; Referee: Fred Graham

21 December 2012 23	Rochdale	4–1	Cheltenham Town	Rochdale
19:45 GMT	Grant 38'; Grimes 45+2', 67'; Adebola 69'; Bennett (yellow card) 80'	Report	Carter (yellow card) 42'; P. Edwards 48' (o.g.); Jones (yellow card) 72'; Duffy (yellow card) 82'	Stadium: Spotland Stadium; Attendance: 1,605; Referee: Michael Naylor

26 December 2012 24	Burton Albion	3–2	Rochdale	Burton upon Trent
15:00 GMT	Kee 15', 57' (yellow card) 81'; Zola 25'	Report	Cavanagh 41'; Tutte (yellow card) 45'; Grant 54' (yellow card) 58'; Grimes (yellow card) 62'	Stadium: Pirelli Stadium; Attendance: 2,994; Referee: Bobby Madley

29 December 2012 25	Bradford City	2–4	Rochdale	Bradford
15:00 GMT	Doyle (yellow card) 12'; Connell 19' (pen.), 36' (pen.); Reid (yellow card) 85'	Report	Gornell 6', 40'; Tutte 27'; Grimes 33'; Rafferty (yellow card) 81'	Stadium: Valley Parade; Attendance: 2,994; Referee: Bobby Madley

1 January 2013 26	Rochdale	1–2	Rotherham United	Rochdale
15:00 GMT	Rafferty (yellow card) 61'; Grimes 29'; Grant (yellow card) 88'	Report	Frecklington (yellow card) 66'; Odejayi 78'; Bradley (yellow card) 86'; Cameron 90'; Agard (yellow card) 90+1'	Stadium: Spotland Stadium; Attendance: 3,408; Referee: Stuart Attwell

5 January 2013 27	Rochdale	0–1	AFC Wimbledon	Rochdale
15:00 GMT	Rafferty (red card) 58'	Report	McCallum 56'; Midson (yellow card) 70'	Stadium: Spotland Stadium; Attendance: 2,071; Referee: Kevin Wright

12 January 2013 28	Dagenham & Redbridge	2–1	Rochdale	Dagenham
15:00 GMT	Williams (yellow card) 41'; Ogogo 75'; Hoyte (yellow card) 89'; Elito 90'	Report	Tutte 72'; Grant (yellow card) 89'; Cavanagh (yellow card) 90'	Stadium: Victoria Road; Attendance: 2,289; Referee: Steve Rushton

25 January 2013 29	Cheltenham Town	0–0	Rochdale	Cheltenham
19:45 GMT	Deering (yellow card) 65'	Report	Rafferty (yellow card) 45+1'; Cavanagh (yellow card) 94'	Stadium: Whaddon Road; Attendance: 2,348; Referee: Robert Lewis

2 February 2013 30	Rochdale	1–1	Chesterfield	Rochdale
15:00 GMT	Grant 66' (red card) 86'; Grimes (yellow card) 69'	Report	O'Shea 55'; Cooper (yellow card) 61'	Stadium: Spotland Stadium; Attendance: 2,746; Referee: Andy Haines

9 February 2013 31	Northampton Town	3–1	Rochdale	Northampton
15:00 GMT	Platt 32'; Langmead 69'; Akinfenwa 76' (pen.)	Report	Kennedy 65'; McIntyre (yellow card) 74'	Stadium: Sixfields Stadium; Attendance: 5,110; Referee: James Linington

16 February 2013 32	Rochdale	1–0	Torquay United	Rochdale
15:00 GMT	Bennett 18'; Donnelly (yellow card) 46'	Report		Stadium: Spotland Stadium; Attendance: 2,351; Referee: Andy Davies

23 February 2013 33	Barnet	0–0	Rochdale	Barnet
15:00 GMT	Vilhete (yellow card) 85'; N'Gala (yellow card) 89'	Report	Barry-Murphy (yellow card) 57'; Rose (yellow card) 69'; Jones (yellow card) 77'	Stadium: Underhill Stadium; Attendance: 1,870; Referee: Brendan Malone

26 February 2013 34	Rochdale	0–3	Accrington Stanley	Rochdale
19:45 GMT	Jones (yellow card) 35'	Report	Murphy (yellow card) 73'; Molyneux 76', 80'; Boco 86'	Stadium: Spotland Stadium; Attendance: 1,780; Referee: Andy Madley

2 March 2013 35	Morecambe	3–0	Rochdale	Morecambe
15:00 GMT	Fleming (yellow card) 3' (goal) 63'; McCready 9'; Ellison 60'	Report		Stadium: Globe Arena; Attendance: 2,028; Referee: Carl Boyeson

9 March 2013 36	Rochdale	4–1	Wycombe Wanderers	Rochdale
15:00 GMT	Henderson 19'; Harriman 48' (o.g.); Donnelly 78', 85'	Report	Lewis 16'; Morgan (yellow card) 44'; Scowen (yellow card) 45'; Morias (yellow card) 76'	Stadium: Spotland Stadium; Attendance: 1,979; Referee: David Phillips

12 March 2013 37	York City	0–0	Rochdale	York
19:45 GMT	Blair (yellow card) 68'	Report		Stadium: Bootham Crescent; Attendance: 2,929; Referee: Darren Drysdale

16 March 2013 38	Bristol Rovers	2–1	Rochdale	Bristol
15:00 GMT	O'Toole (yellow card) 30'; Harrison (yellow card) 34' (goal) 62', 84'	Report	Rose 75'	Stadium: Memorial Stadium; Attendance: 6,691; Referee: Darren Sheldrake

19 March 2013 39	Rochdale	1–1	Gillingham	Rochdale
19:45 GMT	Donnelly 12'; Kennedy (yellow card) 31'	Report	Kedwell 56'; Allen (yellow card) 65'; Barrett (yellow card) 78'; Frampton (red card) 88'	Stadium: Spotland Stadium; Attendance: 1,551; Referee: Mark Haywood

29 March 2013 40	Rochdale	1–1	Aldershot Town	Rochdale
15:00 GMT	Donnelly 52'; Cavanagh (yellow card) 60'; Henderson (yellow card) 90+2'	Report	Goulding (yellow card) 60'; Mekki 73'	Stadium: Spotland Stadium; Attendance: 2,280; Referee: Nigel Miller

1 April 2013 41	Exeter City	1–2	Rochdale	Exeter
15:00 BST	Cureton 45'	Report	Henderson 87'; Grant 90'	Stadium: St James Park; Attendance: 3,979; Referee: Phil Gibbs

6 April 2013 42	Fleetwood Town	0–3	Rochdale	Fleetwood
15:00 BST		Report	Henderson 9'; Donnelly 61'; Kennedy 89'	Stadium: Highbury Stadium; Attendance: 2,954; Referee: Anthony Bates

10 April 2013 43	Rochdale	4–2	Southend United	Rochdale
19:45 BST	Donnelly (yellow card) 31'; Rose 34' (yellow card) 59'; Grant 51', 74'; Grimes 77'	Report	Cresswell (yellow card) 18'; Phillips 46'; Corr 90'	Stadium: Spotland Stadium; Attendance: 1,758; Referee: Craig Pawson

13 April 2013 44	Rochdale	2–2	Port Vale	Rochdale
15:00 BST	Cavanagh (yellow card) 32'; Chilvers 31' (o.g.); Kennedy 90'	Report	Chilvers 89'; Pope 34'	Stadium: Spotland Stadium; Attendance: 5,042; Referee: Richard Clark

20 April 2013 45	Oxford United	3–0	Rochdale	Oxford
15:00 BST	Whing 53'; Constable 76'; Potter 90'	Report	Logan (yellow card) 85'	Stadium: Kassam Stadium; Attendance: 6,014; Referee: Steve Rushton

27 April 2013 46	Rochdale	1–0	Plymouth Argyle	Rochdale
15:00 BST	Thomas (yellow card) 7'; Gray (yellow card) 18'; Donnelly (yellow card) 63'; Bunney 78'	Report	Blanchard (red card) 14'	Stadium: Spotland Stadium; Attendance: 4,272; Referee: Geoff Eltringham

== FA Cup ==
3 November 2012 First Round	Morecambe	1–1	Rochdale	Morecambe
15:00	Fleming 12'; Drummond (yellow card) 43'; Ellison (yellow card) 45+3'	Report; Report	R. Edwards (yellow card) 40'; Kennedy 72'; Grant (yellow card) 88'	Stadium: Globe Arena; Attendance: 1,839; Referee: Stephen Martin

13 November 2012 Replay	Rochdale	0–1	Morecambe	Rochdale
19:45	Grimes (yellow card) 47'; McIntyre (yellow card) 78'; Pearson (yellow card) 90+2'	Report; Report	McDonald 44'; Alessandra (yellow card) 53'	Stadium: Spotland; Attendance: 1,675; Referee: Geoff Eltringham

== Football League Cup ==
11 August 2012 First round	Rochdale	3–4 (a.e.t.)	Barnsley	Rochdale
15:00 BST	Tutte 6'; P. Edwards (yellow card) 42'; Kennedy 90+4' (pen.), 105+2' (pen.); Putterill (yellow card) 99'	Report; Report	Dagnall (yellow card) 46' (goal) 105'; Stones 45'; Davies 79'; Alnwick (red card) 90+2'; Wiseman 95'; McNulty (yellow card) 105+2'	Stadium: Spotland; Attendance: 2,709; Referee: Gary Sutton

== Football League Trophy ==
4 September 2012 First round Northern section	Rochdale	2–2 (4–2 p)	Fleetwood Town	Rochdale
19:30 BST	Grant 26' (pen.); Putterill 58'	Report	McGuire 64', 72'	Stadium: Spotland Stadium; Attendance: 1,256; Referee: Darren Bond
	Penalties
	Putterill (penalty scored); Tutte (penalty missed); P. Edwards (penalty scored); McIntyre (penalty scored); Grant (penalty scored)		Milligan (penalty scored); Mangan (penalty missed); McGuire (penalty missed); Nicholson (penalty scored)

9 October 2012 Second round Northern section	Rochdale	1–1 (4–5 p)	Bury	Rochdale
19:30 BST	Grimes 18'; P. Edwards (yellow card) 51'; Cavanagh (yellow card) 53'; Curran (red card) 80'	Report; Report	Hughes (yellow card) 27'; Schumacher 52' (yellow card) 75'	Stadium: Spotland Stadium; Attendance: 2826; Referee: Bobby Madley
	Penalties
	Tutte (penalty scored); Grimes (penalty scored); McIntyre (penalty scored); P. Edwards (penalty missed); Bennett (penalty scored)		Schumacher (penalty scored); Doherty (penalty scored); Cullen (penalty scored); Bishop (penalty scored); Lockwood (penalty scored)
