= 2011–12 Rochdale A.F.C. season =

English football club season

Rochdale A.F.C.
2011–12 season
- Chairman: Chris Dunphy
- Manager: Steve Eyre (until 19 December); Chris Beech (caretaker, until 24 Jan); John Coleman (from 24 January)
- Stadium: Spotland Stadium
- League One: 24th (relegated)
- FA Cup: First round
- League Cup: Third round
- Football League Trophy: Third round
- Top goalscorer: League: Ashley Grimes (8 goals); All: Ashley Grimes (11 goals)
Home colours	Away colours	Third colours

The 2011–12 season was Rochdale A.F.C.'s 105th in existence and their second consecutive season in League One. Along with competing in League One, the club participated in the FA Cup, Football League Cup and Football League Trophy. The season covers the period from 1 July 2011 to 30 June 2012.

== League table ==
Pos	Team	Pld	W	D	L	GF	GA	GD	Pts	Promotion, qualification or relegation
20	Leyton Orient	46	13	11	22	48	75	−27	50	
21	Wycombe Wanderers (R)	46	11	10	25	65	88	−23	43	Relegation to Football League Two
22	Chesterfield (R)	46	10	12	24	56	81	−25	42	Relegation to Football League Two
23	Exeter City (R)	46	10	12	24	46	75	−29	42	Relegation to Football League Two
24	Rochdale (R)	46	8	14	24	47	81	−34	38	Relegation to Football League Two

Updated to match(es) played on 5 May 2012. Source: BBC Sport
Rules for classification: 1) Points; 2) Goal difference; 3) Number of goals scored
(R) Relegated

== Squad statistics ==
=== Appearances and goals ===
No.	Pos	Nat	Player	Total		League One		FA Cup		League Cup		League Trophy	
No.	Pos	Nat	Player	Apps	Goals	Apps	Goals	Apps	Goals	Apps	Goals	Apps	Goals
1	GK	(England) ENG	Jake Kean	15	0	14 + 0	0	0 + 0	0	0 + 0	0	1 + 0	0
1	GK	(Hungary) HUN	Peter Kurucz	11	0	11 + 0	0	0 + 0	0	0 + 0	0	0 + 0	0
2	DF	(England) ENG	Stephen Darby	40	0	34 + 1	0	0 + 0	0	3 + 0	0	2 + 0	0
3	DF	(England) ENG	Joe Widdowson	35	0	30 + 2	0	0 + 0	0	3 + 0	0	0 + 0	0
4	DF	(England) ENG	Marcus Holness	30	3	23 + 1	3	1 + 0	0	3 + 0	0	2 + 0	0
5	DF	(England) ENG	Kevin Amankwaah	16	0	15 + 1	0	0 + 0	0	0 + 0	0	0 + 0	0
5	DF	(England) ENG	Neal Trotman	14	0	12 + 0	0	0 + 0	0	1 + 0	0	1 + 0	0
6	MF	(Republic of Ireland) IRL	Brian Barry-Murphy	26	1	17 + 5	1	1 + 0	0	0 + 1	0	2 + 0	0
7	MF	(England) ENG	Jason Kennedy	50	4	38 + 6	4	1 + 0	0	3 + 0	0	2 + 0	0
8	MF	(England) ENG	Gary Jones	50	6	45 + 0	5	1 + 0	0	3 + 0	1	1 + 0	0
9	FW	(England) ENG	Harry Bunn	8	1	5 + 1	0	1 + 0	0	0 + 0	0	1 + 0	1
9	FW	(England) ENG	Michael Symes	15	4	14 + 1	4	0 + 0	0	0 + 0	0	0 + 0	0
10	FW	(England) ENG	Ashley Grimes	42	11	27 + 9	8	0 + 1	0	3 + 0	3	0 + 2	0
11	MF	(Wales) WAL	Nicky Adams	47	4	30 + 11	4	1 + 0	0	3 + 0	0	0 + 2	0
12	DF	(Netherlands) NED	Pim Balkestein	15	0	12 + 1	0	0 + 0	0	2 + 0	0	0 + 0	0
12	DF	(Republic of Ireland) IRL	Kevin Long	16	0	16 + 0	0	0 + 0	0	0 + 0	0	0 + 0	0
14	MF	(Scotland) SCO	Marc Twaddle	3	0	1 + 1	0	0 + 0	0	0 + 0	0	1 + 0	0
15	MF	(England) ENG	Joe Thompson	21	1	8 + 9	1	0 + 0	0	0 + 3	0	1 + 0	0
16	MF	(England) ENG	Andrew Tutte	45	1	28 + 12	1	1 + 0	0	3 + 0	0	1 + 0	0
17	DF	(England) ENG	Dean Holden	22	0	20 + 1	0	1 + 0	0	0 + 0	0	0 + 0	0
17	MF	(England) ENG	Paul Marshall	1	0	0 + 1	0	0 + 0	0	0 + 0	0	0 + 0	0
18	MF	(England) ENG	Simon Hackney	2	0	1 + 1	0	0 + 0	0	0 + 0	0	0 + 0	0
19	FW	(England) ENG	Matthew Barnes-Homer	7	0	1 + 4	0	0 + 0	0	0 + 1	0	1 + 0	0
19	FW	(Malta) MLT	Daniel Bogdanovic	5	1	5 + 0	1	0 + 0	0	0 + 0	0	0 + 0	0
19	DF	(England) ENG	Sam Minihan	1	0	1 + 0	0	0 + 0	0	0 + 0	0	0 + 0	0
19	FW	(England) ENG	Chris O'Grady	1	0	0 + 1	0	0 + 0	0	0 + 0	0	0 + 0	0
19	MF	(England) ENG	Tope Obadeyi	6	1	3 + 3	1	0 + 0	0	0 + 0	0	0 + 0	0
20	DF	(England) ENG	Jordan Fagbola	0	0	0 + 0	0	0 + 0	0	0 + 0	0	0 + 0	0
21	GK	(Scotland) SCO	Matty Edwards	9	0	6 + 2	0	0 + 0	0	1 + 0	0	0 + 0	0
22	DF	(England) ENG	Stephen Jordan	21	0	17 + 2	0	1 + 0	0	0 + 0	0	1 + 0	0
23	GK	(England) ENG	David Lucas	20	0	16 + 0	0	1 + 0	0	2 + 0	0	1 + 0	0
24	DF	(Republic of Ireland) IRL	Neill Byrne	3	0	2 + 1	0	0 + 0	0	0 + 0	0	0 + 0	0
24	FW	(England) ENG	Nathan Eccleston	7	1	3 + 2	1	0 + 1	0	0 + 0	0	1 + 0	0
25	MF	(History of Libya under Muammar Gaddafi) [[|Libya]]	Ahmed Benali	3	0	0 + 2	0	0 + 0	0	0 + 0	0	1 + 0	0
26	FW	(France) FRA	Jean-Louis Akpa Akpro	47	8	30 + 11	7	1 + 0	0	3 + 0	1	1 + 1	0
27	FW	(Netherlands) NED	Roland Bergkamp	3	0	2 + 1	0	0 + 0	0	0 + 0	0	0 + 0	0
27	MF	(England) ENG	Sean McConville	4	0	2 + 2	0	0 + 0	0	0 + 0	0	0 + 0	0
28	MF	(England) ENG	Reece Gray	4	1	1 + 3	1	0 + 0	0	0 + 0	0	0 + 0	0
29	FW	(Nigeria) NGR	Godwin Ababaki	2	0	0 + 2	0	0 + 0	0	0 + 0	0	0 + 0	0
30	FW	(England) ENG	Brett Ormerod	5	1	4 + 1	1	0 + 0	0	0 + 0	0	0 + 0	0
31	GK	(England) ENG	Jordan Andrews	0	0	0 + 0	0	0 + 0	0	0 + 0	0	0 + 0	0
39	FW	(England) ENG	David Ball	15	4	12 + 2	3	0 + 0	0	0 + 0	0	1 + 0	1
	GK	(England) ENG	Danny Taberner	0	0	0 + 0	0	0 + 0	0	0 + 0	0	0 + 0	0
	DF	(Angola) ANG	David Kuagica	0	0	0 + 0	0	0 + 0	0	0 + 0	0	0 + 0	0
	FW	(England) ENG	Paul McCallum	0	0	0 + 0	0	0 + 0	0	0 + 0	0	0 + 0	0

=== Top scorers ===
Place	Position	Nation	Number	Name	League One	FA Cup	League Cup	FL Trophy	Total
1	FW	(England)	10	Ashley Grimes	3	0	2	0	5
2	FW	(France)	26	Jean-Louis Akpa Akpro	2	0	1	0	3
3	FW	(England)	39	David Ball	2	0	0	0	2
=	MF	(England)	8	Gary Jones	1	0	1	0	2
4	MF	(Wales)	11	Nicky Adams	1	0	0	0	1
=	DF	(England)	4	Marcus Holness	1	0	0	0	1
=	MF	(England)	7	Jason Kennedy	1	0	0	0	1
				TOTALS	10	0	4	0	14

=== Disciplinary record ===
Number	Nation	Position	Name	League One		FA Cup		League Cup		FL Trophy		Total	
Number	Nation	Position	Name	Yellow card	Red card	Yellow card	Red card	Yellow card	Red card	Yellow card	Red card	Yellow card	Red card
5	(England)	DF	Neal Trotman	2	1	0	0	0	0	0	0	2	1
11	(Wales)	MF	Nicky Adams	1	1	0	0	0	0	0	0	1	1
2	(England)	DF	Stephen Darby	2	0	0	0	0	0	0	0	2	0
26	(France)	FW	Jean-Louis Akpa Akpro	1	0	0	0	0	0	0	0	1	0
10	(England)	FW	Ashley Grimes	1	0	0	0	0	0	0	0	1	0
4	(England)	DF	Marcus Holness	1	0	0	0	0	0	0	0	1	0
8	(England)	MF	Gary Jones	1	0	0	0	0	0	0	0	1	0
1	(England)	GK	Jake Kean	1	0	0	0	0	0	0	0	1	0
16	(England)	MF	Andrew Tutte	1	0	0	0	0	0	0	0	1	0
3	(England)	DF	Joe Widdowson	0	0	0	0	1	0	0	0	1	0
			TOTALS	11	2	0	0	1	0	0	0	12	2

== Results ==
=== Pre-season Friendlies ===
16 July 2011	Southport	1–2	Rochdale	Southport
15:00 BST	Gray 62'	Report	Grimes 55'; Hackney 82'	Stadium: Haig Avenue

19 July 2011	Rochdale	0–1	Leeds United	Rochdale
19:30 BST		Report	Gradel 30'	Stadium: Spotland Stadium; Attendance: 3,935

23 July 2011	Wrexham	3–2	Rochdale	Wrexham
15:00 BST	Wright 6'; Holness 21'; Tolley (?)	Report	Grimes (?); Jarrett 45'	Stadium: Racecourse Ground; Attendance: 835

26 July 2011	Rochdale	3–0	West Bromwich Albion	Rochdale
19:45 BST	Grimes 6'; Jones 28' (pen.); Akpa Akpro 79'	Report		Stadium: Spotland Stadium; Attendance: 1,743

30 July 2011	Crewe Alexandra	2–1	Rochdale	Crewe
15:00 BST	Miller 2'; Shelley 18' (pen.)		Marshall 78'	Stadium: Alexandra Stadium

=== League One ===
6 August 2011 1	Sheffield Wednesday	2–0	Rochdale	Sheffield
15:00 BST	Jones 16' (yellow card) 69'; Morrison (yellow card) 53'; Prutton 72'	Report	Trotman (yellow card) 69'	Stadium: Hillsborough Stadium; Attendance: 21,174; Referee: Nigel Miller

13 August 2011 2	Rochdale	2–2	Huddersfield Town	Rochdale
15:00 BST	Akpa Akpro 43'; Grimes 89'; Darby (yellow card) 90'	Report	Novak 15'; Gobern (yellow card) 35'; Ward 69'	Stadium: Spotland Stadium; Attendance: 5,074; Referee: Andy Haines

16 August 2011 3	Rochdale	0–0	Carlisle United	Rochdale
19:45 BST	Akpa Akpro (yellow card) 34'; Holness (yellow card) 77'	Report		Stadium: Spotland Stadium; Attendance: 2,671; Referee: Mark Brown

20 August 2011 4	Oldham Athletic	2–0	Rochdale	Oldham
15:00 BST	Reid 32' (pen.); Clarke (yellow card) 40' (goal) 45+3'	Report	Trotman (yellow card) 28' (yellow-red card) 41'	Stadium: Boundary Park; Attendance: 5,266; Referee: Eddie Ilderton

27 August 2011 5	Rochdale	1–3	Hartlepool United	Rochdale
15:00 BST	Akpa Akpro 16'	Report	Boyd 7'; Poole 47', 87'	Stadium: Spotland Stadium; Attendance: 2,600; Referee: Mark Heywood

3 September 2011 6	Stevenage	4–2	Rochdale	Stevenage
15:00 BST	Reid 13' (yellow card) 53'; Beardsley 30', 45+2'; Trotman 70' (o.g.)	Report	Jones 28' (yellow card) 31'; Ball 71'	Stadium: Broadhall Way; Attendance: 3,021; Referee: David Phillips

10 September 2011 7	Bury	2–4	Rochdale	Bury
15:00 BST	M. Jones 21'; Bishop 63'	Report	Grimes 5'; Holness 10'; Adams 18' (yellow card) 19' (yellow-red card) 76'; Ball 47'; Tutte (yellow card) 48'; Darby (yellow card) 55'	Stadium: Gigg Lane Stadium; Attendance: 4,897; Referee: Graham Salisbury

13 September 2011 8	Rochdale	1–0	Scunthorpe United	Rochdale
19:45 BST	Grimes (yellow card) 66'; Kennedy 59'; Kean (yellow card) 90'	Report		Stadium: Spotland Stadium; Attendance: 2,368; Referee: Geoff Eltringham

17 September 2011 9	Rochdale	2–3	Charlton Athletic	Rochdale
15:00 BST	Kennedy (yellow card) 31'; Widdowson (yellow card) 40'; Grimes 57'; Ball 60'	Report	Hollands 20', 80'; Wiggins 44'; Jackson (yellow card) 82'	Stadium: Spotland Stadium; Attendance: 2,909; Referee: Steve Rushton

24 September 2011 10	Notts County	2–0	Rochdale	Nottingham
15:00 BST	Hughes 35' (yellow card) 81'; Sodje (yellow card) 88' (goal) 90+4'	Report	Balkestein (yellow card) 45'; Adams (yellow card) 90'	Stadium: Meadow Lane; Attendance: 6,199; Referee: Dean Whitestone

1 October 2011 11	Rochdale	2–1	Wycombe Wanderers	Rochdale
15:00 BST	Grimes 21', 66'; Trotman (yellow card) 81'	Report	Donnelly 6'; McCoy (yellow card) 61'	Stadium: Spotland Stadium; Attendance: 2,266; Referee: Mark Heywood

8 October 2011 12	Bournemouth	1–1	Rochdale	Bournemouth
15:00 BST	Zubar (yellow card) 29'; Arter (yellow card) 58'; Symes 68' (pen.)	Report	Jones 30' (pen.); Kean (yellow card) 67'; Ball (yellow card) 73'	Stadium: Dean Court; Attendance: 5,345; Referee: Gavin Ward

15 October 2011 13	Rochdale	2–2	Colchester United	Rochdale
15:00 BST	Holness 43'; Akpa Akpro (yellow card) 65'; Jones 88'	Report	Henderson 3'; Odejayi 14' (yellow card) 90'; Okuonghae (red card) 29'	Stadium: Spotland Stadium; Attendance: 2,226; Referee: David Webb

22 October 2011 14	Exeter City	3–1	Rochdale	Exeter
15:00 BST	Oakley (yellow card) 26'; Nardiello 45', 56' (pen.); Sercombe (yellow card) 52'; Taylor 81'	Report	Eccleston 31'; Grimes (yellow card) 90+4'	Stadium: St James Park; Attendance: 3,844; Referee: Carl Berry

25 October 2011 15	Rochdale	1–1	Chesterfield	Rochdale
19:45 BST	Jones (yellow card) 45' (goal) 74'	Report	Westcarr 36'	Stadium: Spotland Stadium; Attendance: 2,494; Referee: Darren Drysdale

29 October 2011 16	Rochdale	0–2	Leyton Orient	Rochdale
15:00 BST	Jordan (yellow card) 73'	Report	Smith 12'; Mooney 65'	Stadium: Spotland Stadium; Attendance: 2,322; Referee: James Adcock

5 November 2011 17	MK Dons	3–1	Rochdale	Milton Keynes
15:00 GMT	Smith 17'; MacDonald 22'; Beevers 31'; Ibehre (yellow card) 83'	Report	Barry-Murphy 8'	Stadium: Stadium:mk; Attendance: 7,120; Referee: Andy Woolmer

19 November 2011 18	Preston North End	0–1	Rochdale	Preston
15:00 GMT	Parry (yellow card) 89'	Report	Adams 84'	Stadium: Deepdale; Attendance: 10,456; Referee: Oliver Langford

26 November 2011 19	Rochdale	1–2	Brentford	Rochdale
15:00 GMT	Holden (yellow card) 16'; Jordan (yellow card) 21'; Bergkamp (yellow card) 44'; Holness 65'	Report	Alexander 11' (pen.) (yellow card) 23'; Saunders 78'	Stadium: Spotland Stadium; Attendance: 2,466; Referee: Gary Sutton

10 December 2011 20	Sheffield United	3–0	Rochdale	Sheffield
15:00 GMT	Evans 39', 64'; Cresswell 57'	Report		Stadium: Bramall Lane; Attendance: 15,892; Referee: Dean Whitestone

17 December 2011 21	Rochdale	0–0	Yeovil Town	Rochdale
15:00 GMT	Bunn (yellow card) 90'	Report	Gilbert (yellow card) 42' (yellow-red card) 77'	Stadium: Spotland Stadium; Attendance: 2,692; Referee: Chris Sarginson

26 December 2011	Tranmere Rovers	P–P	Rochdale	Birkenhead
15:00 GMT				Stadium: Prenton Park

31 December 2011 22	Walsall	0–0	Rochdale	Walsall
15:00 GMT	Smith (yellow card) 42'; Beevers (yellow card) 54'; Bowerman (yellow card) 86'	Report		Stadium: Bescot Stadium; Attendance: 3,907; Referee: Andy Madley

2 January 2012 23	Rochdale	1–1	Preston	Rochdale
13:00 GMT	Bogdanović 25'; Kennedy (yellow card) 87'	Report	Jervis 17'	Stadium: Spotland Stadium; Attendance: 4,570; Referee: Trevor Kettle

7 January 2012 24	Hartlepool United	2–0	Rochdale	Hartlepool
15:00 GMT	Brown 74'; James 80'; Monkhouse (yellow card) 86'	Report	Widdowson (yellow card) 82'	Stadium: Victoria Park; Attendance: 4,663; Referee: James Adcock

14 January 2012 25	Rochdale	1–5	Stevenage	Rochdale
15:00 GMT	Ormerod 52'; Widdowson (yellow card) 26' (yellow-red card) 56'	Report	Freeman 18', 58'; Wilson 46', 53' (yellow card) 90'; Byrom 66'	Stadium: Spotland Stadium; Attendance: 2,367; Referee: Colin Webster

17 January 2012 26	Tranmere Rovers	0–0	Rochdale	Birkenhead
19:45 GMT	McChrystal (yellow card) 57'; Weir (yellow card) 78'	Report	Akpa Akpro (yellow card) 50'; Barry-Murphy (yellow card) 75'; Ormerod (yellow card) 78'	Stadium: Prenton Park; Attendance: 4,153

21 January 2012 27	Wycombe Wanderers	3–0	Rochdale	High Wycombe
15:00 GMT	Beavon 32', 73'; Winfield 75'	Report	Jordan (yellow card) 90'	Stadium: Adams Park; Attendance: 4,285; Referee: Pat Miller

28 January 2012 28	Rochdale	3–0	Bury	Rochdale
15:00 GMT	Akpa Akpro 15'; Grimes 41', 55'	Report	Coke (yellow card) 63'; Bishop (yellow card) 90+1'	Stadium: Spotland Stadium; Attendance: 5,033; Referee: Scott Mathieson

14 February 2012 29	Scunthorpe United	1–0	Rochdale	Scunthorpe
19:45 GMT	Thompson 64'	Report	Widdowson (yellow card) 68'; Long (yellow card) 73'	Stadium: Glanford Park; Attendance: 3,409; Referee: Bobby Madley

18 February 2012 30	Rochdale	1–0	AFC Bournemouth	Rochdale
15:00 GMT	Grimes (yellow card) 52'; Jones 90+2' (pen.)	Report	Francis (yellow card) 83'	Stadium: Spotland Stadium; Attendance: 2,499; Referee: Carl Boyeson

21 February 2012 31	Charlton Athletic	1–1	Rochdale	London
19:45 GMT	Kermorgant 56'	Report	Adams 53'; Long (yellow card) 56'	Stadium: The Valley; Attendance: 15,067; Referee: Fred Graham

25 February 2012 32	Colchester United	0–0	Rochdale	Colchester
15:00 GMT	Izzet (yellow card) 74'	Report	Symes (yellow card) 22'; Long (yellow card) 45+2'	Stadium: Colchester Community Stadium; Attendance: 3,096; Referee: David Coote

28 February 2012 33	Rochdale	0–1	Notts County	Rochdale
19:45 GMT		Report	Sodje (yellow card) 27'; Bencherif 45'; Harley (yellow card) 46'; Nelson (yellow card) 78'; Hughes (red card) 89'	Stadium: Spotland Stadium; Attendance: 2,326; Referee: Steve Rushton

3 March 2012 34	Rochdale	0–0	Sheffield Wednesday	Rochdale
15:00 GMT		Report		Stadium: Spotland Stadium; Attendance: 5,361; Referee: Tony Bates

6 March 2012 35	Carlisle United	2–1	Rochdale	Carlisle
19:45 GMT	Berrett (yellow card) 33'; McGovern 58'; Zoko 76'	Report	Kennedy 74'; Widdowson (yellow card) 88'	Stadium: Brunton Park; Attendance: 3,694; Referee: Colin Webster

10 March 2012 36	Huddersfield Town	2–2	Rochdale	Huddersfield
15:00 GMT	Ward 45+1'; Rhodes 48'	Report	Tutte 45+2'; Grimes 82'; Long (yellow card) 84'	Stadium: Galpharm Stadium; Attendance: 13,715; Referee: David Webb

17 March 2012 37	Rochdale	3–2	Oldham Athletic	Rochdale
15:00 GMT	Symes 3', 47', 70'; Akpa Akpro (yellow card) 78'	Report	Kuqi 21'; Mvoto (yellow card) 33'; Tarkowski (yellow card) 69' (yellow-red card) 90+6'; Reid 74'; Taylor (yellow card) 90+6'	Stadium: Spotland Stadium; Attendance: 4,671; Referee: Graham Salisbury

20 March 2012 38	Rochdale	0–2	Tranmere Rovers	Rochdale
19:45 GMT		Report	Wallace 28'; Cassidy 82' (yellow card) 87'	Stadium: Spotland Stadium; Attendance: 2,618; Referee: Nigel Miller

24 March 2012 39	Brentford	2–0	Rochdale	Brentford
15:00 GMT	Diagouraga 32'; Donaldson 85'	Report	Jordan (yellow card) 33'	Stadium: Griffin Park; Attendance: 4,919; Referee: Brendan Malone

31 March 2012 40	Rochdale	3–3	Walsall	Rochdale
15:00 BST	Kennedy 66'; Symes 82' (pen.); Akpa Akpro 90+3'	Report	Ledesma 25'; Widdowson 38' (o.g.); Butler 90+4'	Stadium: Spotland Stadium; Attendance: 2,516; Referee: Mark Heywood

7 April 2012 41	Yeovil Town	3–1	Rochdale	Yeovil
15:00 BST	Franks 7'; Hinds 29'; Huntington (yellow card) 55'; Woods 75'	Report	Holness (yellow card) 56'; Grounds 80' (o.g.); Tutte (yellow card) 82'	Stadium: Huish Park; Attendance: 3,859; Referee: James Adcock

10 April 2012 42	Rochdale	2–5	Sheffield United	Rochdale
19:45 BST	Kennedy 3'; Obadeyi 68'	Report	McDonald 5' (yellow card) 61'; Evans 22', 45+3'; Williamson 25'; Doyle 57'	Stadium: Spotland Stadium; Attendance: 5,309; Referee: Eddie Ilderton

14 April 2012 43	Rochdale	3–2	Exeter City	Rochdale
15:00 BST	Twaddle (yellow card) 58'; Adams 79'; Thompson 81'; Kennedy 88'	Report	Nardiello 28' (pen.); Sercombe 62'	Stadium: Spotland Stadium; Attendance: 1,930; Referee: Andy Madley

21 April 2012 44	Chesterfield	2–1	Rochdale	Chesterfield
15:00 BST	Randall (yellow card) 44'; Bowery (yellow card) 76'; Boden 81'; Whitaker 86'	Report	Widdowson (yellow card) 52'; Akpa Akpro 73'	Stadium: B2net Stadium; Attendance: 5,954; Referee: Craig Pawson

28 April 2012 45	Rochdale	1–2	Milton Keynes Dons	Rochdale
15:00 BST	Akpa Akpro 85'	Report	O'Shea 3'; Bowditch 58'	Stadium: Spotland Stadium; Attendance: 2,212; Referee: Mark Brown

5 May 2012 46	Leyton Orient	2–1	Rochdale	London
15:00 BST	Cox 32'; Odubajo 41'	Report	Gray (yellow card) 61' (goal) 75'	Stadium: Matchroom Stadium; Attendance: 4,110; Referee: Stuart Atwell

=== FA Cup ===
12 November 2011 Round 1	Bradford City	1–0	Rochdale	Bradford
15:00	Wells 84' (yellow card) 85'	Report		Stadium: Valley Parade; Attendance: 3,579; Referee: Dean Mohareb

=== League Cup ===
9 August 2011 Round 1	Rochdale	3–2 (a.e.t.)	Chesterfield	Rochdale
19:45	Grimes 19', 111'; Mattis 103' (o.g.)	Report	Whitaker 11', 95' (pen.); Allott (yellow card) 116'	Stadium: Spotland Stadium; Attendance: 1,718; Referee: Scott Mathieson

23 August 2011 Round 2	Queens Park Rangers	0–2	Rochdale	London
19:45		Report	Akpa Akpro 5'; Widdowson (yellow card) 79'; Jones 81'	Stadium: Loftus Road; Attendance: 4,755; Referee: Oliver Langford

20 September 2011 Round 3	Aldershot Town	2–1	Rochdale	Aldershot
19:45	Rankine 47'; Hylton 78'	Report	Kennedy (yellow card) 43'; Grimes 45' (yellow card) 90'; Balkestein (yellow card) 68'; Jones (yellow card) 87'	Stadium: Recreation Ground; Attendance: 3,334; Referee: Andy D'Urso

=== Football League Trophy ===
4 October 2011 Round 2	Rochdale	1–1 (3–1 p)	Walsall	Rochdale
19:15	Ball 49'	Report	Hurst 66'	Stadium: Spotland Stadium; Attendance: 2,089; Referee: Dean Mohareb
	Penalties
	Ball (penalty scored); Grimes (penalty scored); Kennedy (penalty scored)		Taundry (penalty missed); Hurst (penalty missed); Nicholls (penalty scored); Jarvis (penalty missed)

8 November 2011 Round 3	Rochdale	1–1 (2–4 p)	Preston North End	Rochdale
19:30	Bunn 52'	Report	Barton 35'	Stadium: Spotland Stadium; Attendance: 2,395; Referee: Andy Haines
	Penalties
	Jones (penalty scored); Darby (penalty missed); Grimes (penalty scored); Barry-Murphy (penalty missed)		Parry (penalty scored); Nicholson (penalty scored); Alexander (penalty scored); Clark (penalty scored)

== Transfers ==
Players transferred in
Date	Pos.	Name	From	Fee	Ref.
21 June 2011	FW	(England) Ashley Grimes	(England) Millwall	Free Transfer	
24 June 2011	MF	(England) Simon Hackney	(England) Colchester United	Free Transfer	
24 June 2011	MF	(England) Andrew Tutte	(England) Manchester City	Free Transfer	
4 July 2011	DF	(Scotland) Marc Twaddle	(Scotland) Falkirk	Free Transfer	
15 July 2011	DF	(England) Neal Trotman	(England) Preston North End	Free Transfer	
2 August 2011	MF	(England) Paul Marshall	Free agent	Free	
Players transferred out
Date	Pos.	Name	To	Fee	Ref.
21 June 2011	MF	(England) Matt Done	(England) Barnsley	Undisclosed	
21 June 2011	DF	(England) Scott Wiseman	(England) Barnsley	Undisclosed	
1 July 2011	GK	(Wales) Owain Fôn Williams	(England) Tranmere Rovers	Free Transfer	
4 July 2011	DF	(England) Robbie Williams	(England) Plymouth Argyle	Free Transfer	
7 July 2011	DF	(England) Chris Brown	(England) Droylsden	Free Transfer	
25 July 2011	FW	(England) Anthony Elding	(England) Grimsby Town	Undisclosed	
9 August 2011	FW	(England) Chris O'Grady	(England) Sheffield Wednesday	Undisclosed	
Players loaned in
Date from	Pos.	Name	From	Date to	Ref.
7 July 2011	DF	(England) Stephen Darby	(England) Liverpool	31 May 2012	
2 August 2011	GK	(England) Jake Kean	(England) Blackburn Rovers	31 May 2012	
19 August 2011	DF	(Netherlands) Pim Balkestein	(England) Brentford	January 2012	
25 August 2011	FW	(England) Matthew Barnes-Homer	(England) Luton Town	16 January 2012	
31 August 2011	FW	(England) David Ball	(England) Peterborough United		
31 August 2011	MF	(England) Ahmed Benali	(England) Manchester City		
Players loaned out
Date from	Pos.	Name	To	Date to	Ref.
16 December 2011	FW	(England) Reece Gray	(England) Hyde	16 January 2011	
