= Phil Edwards (footballer) =

English association football player (born 1985)

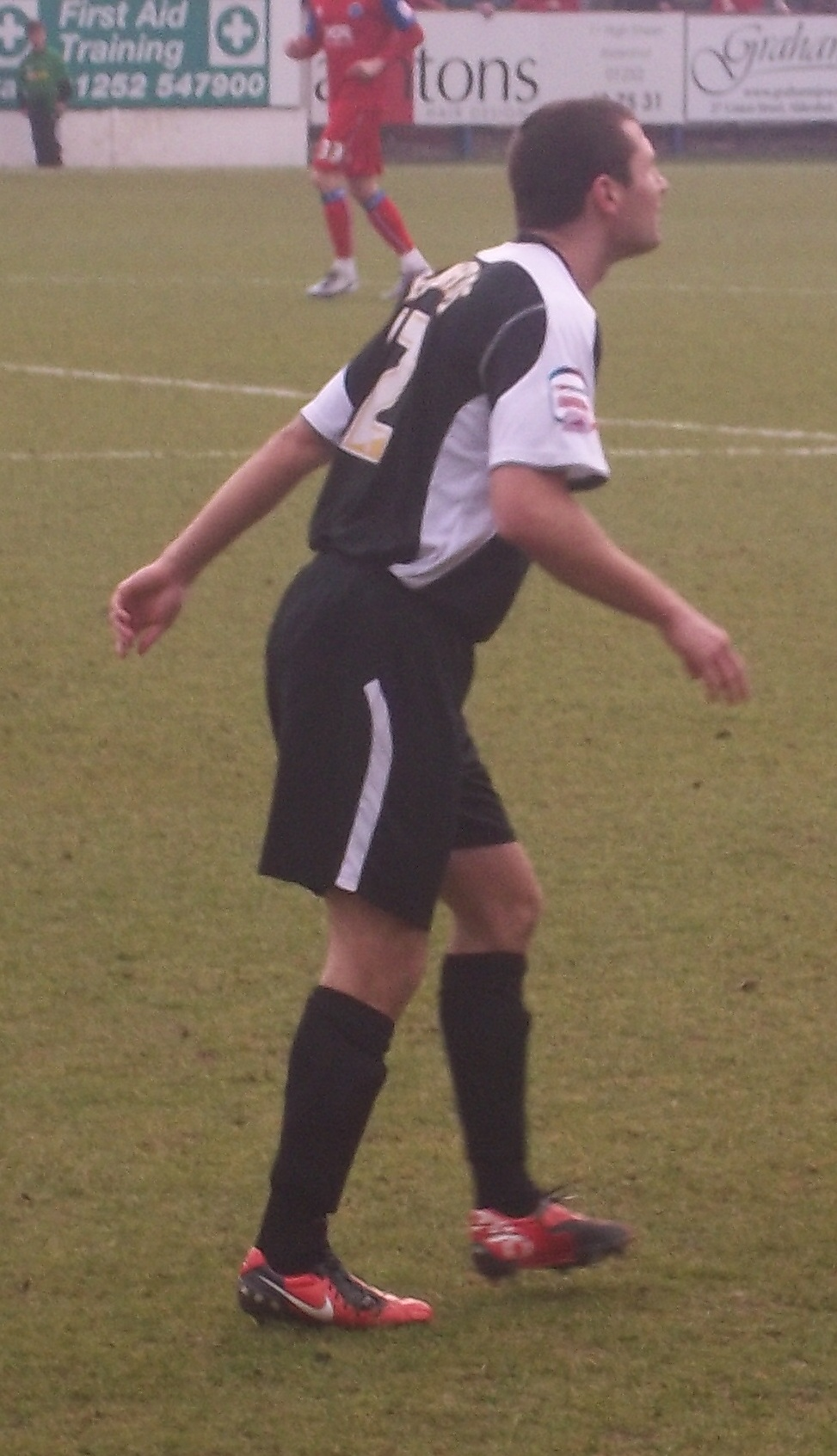
- Edwards playing for Accrington Stanley in 2011

Personal information
- Full name: Philip Lee Edwards
- Date of birth: 8 November 1985 (age 41)
- Place of birth: Bootle, England
- Height: 5 ft 8 in (1.73 m)
- Position: Defender

Youth career
- 2002–2004: Wigan Athletic

Senior career*
Years	Team	Apps	(Gls)
2004–2006	Wigan Athletic	0	(0)
2004	→ Morecambe (loan)	1	(0)
2005–2006	→ Accrington Stanley (loan)	10	(0)
2006–2011	Accrington Stanley	217	(23)
2011–2012	Stevenage	22	(0)
2012	→ Rochdale (loan)	3	(0)
2012–2013	Rochdale	44	(0)
2013–2017	Burton Albion	132	(8)
2016–2017	→ Oxford United (loan)	38	(3)
2017–2019	Bury	37	(0)
2019–2020	Accrington Stanley	4	(0)
2020–2021	Warrington Town	0	(0)
Total		508	(34)
- * Club domestic league appearances and goals

Philip Lee Edwards (born 8 November 1985) is an English former professional footballer who played as a defender.

Edwards began his football career at Wigan Athletic, progressing through the club's youth system before signing a professional contract at the age of 18. In September 2004, he was loaned to Morecambe for one month, making a single appearance before returning to Wigan. During the 2005–06 season, Edwards spent time on loan at Accrington Stanley and joined the club permanently in January 2006, helping them win the Conference National title that season. He made 257 appearances over five years at Accrington.

In June 2011, Edwards signed for Stevenage on a free transfer. In March 2012, he joined Rochdale on loan until the end of the 2011–12 season. Released by Stevenage in May 2012, he signed for Rochdale on a permanent basis in August 2012. Edwards joined League Two club Burton Albion in June 2013, making 151 appearances and helping the club achieve back-to-back promotions to the Championship. Following a loan spell at Oxford United during the 2016–17 season, he was released by Burton and subsequently signed for Bury. He returned to Accrington for one season before briefly joining Warrington Town in November 2020, where he concluded his playing career.

== Early life ==
Born in Bootle, Merseyside, Edwards is a lifelong supporter of Everton.

== Career ==
=== Early career ===
Edwards started his career at Wigan Athletic, signing a professional contract at the age of 18. He was loaned to Morecambe for one month in September 2004 to gain first-team experience, making a single appearance as a substitute in a 2–2 draw against Northwich Victoria. He returned to Wigan in October 2004, where he featured regularly for the reserve team but did not make any first-team appearances.

=== Accrington Stanley ===
Edwards signed for Accrington Stanley on loan in October 2005, making his debut in a 3–3 Football League Trophy draw against Rotherham United. Accrington won each of Edwards' first six matches, conceding only two goals, which helped the club move to the top of the Conference National. His loan was extended until the end of the 2005–06 season in November 2005, and after regular appearances, Edwards signed permanently for Accrington on 12 January 2006. He was part of the team that secured promotion to the Football League with a 1–0 win over Woking on 15 April 2006, making 27 appearances that season.

Edwards scored his first professional goal in a 3–3 home draw with Shrewsbury Town on 2 December 2006. His final appearance of the 2006–07 season was in a 3–2 home victory over Macclesfield Town, a result that ensured the club's Football League status for the following year. He made 39 appearances in all competitions that season, scoring once. Edwards committed to Accrington for the 2007–08 season by signing a one-year contract extension on 8 May 2007. After limited game time during the first half of the season, Edwards was ever-present from December 2007 onwards. He scored his only goal of that season on 4 April 2008, the match-winner in a 1–0 victory against Dagenham & Redbridge, a result that helped secure Accrington's League Two survival. He made 32 appearances in all competitions during the campaign.

Accrington manager John Coleman praised Edwards' form during the start of the 2008–09 season in October 2008, stating: "I couldn't pay him enough compliments. I think the last six months he has been absolutely magnificent. I am convinced if he was three inches bigger he would be playing in the Premier League. He is our best defender and hopefully he'll continue to be a great player for us for a long time". Edwards was substituted after 17 minutes due to injury in Accrington's 2–1 win against Shrewsbury Town on 21 October 2008, but despite needing eight stitches in his knee, he played in the next league match four days later. He appeared in all 50 matches that season as Accrington finished 16th in League Two. In June 2009, he signed a new two-year contract. Edwards scored nine times from central defence during the 2009–10 season, playing in all 57 matches as Accrington finished in 15th place in League Two.

He scored his first two goals of the 2010–11 season on 2 October 2010, both from the penalty spot in Accrington's 7–4 home win against Gillingham. Accrington secured their place in the League Two play-offs by finishing fifth, with Edwards playing in both semi-final matches against Stevenage, which they lost 3–0 on aggregate. That season, he scored 13 goals from defence in 51 appearances, finishing as Accrington's joint top goalscorer alongside Terry Gornell and Sean McConville. At the end of the season, he was offered a two-year contract extension. Accrington assistant manager Jimmy Bell stated: "Phil has been offered a good deal and we're quietly confident, although there have been a few rumours about one or two clubs being interested. But Phil has been here since he was young, he can't drive, he gets looked after by the club and he gets lifts in to training, so he feels quite settled here". Edwards made 257 appearances during his first spell at Accrington, scoring 24 goals.

=== Stevenage ===
After rejecting a contract extension at Accrington, Edwards signed for League One club Stevenage on 27 June 2011, joining on a free transfer. He agreed to a one-year deal with the option of a second year. Upon joining the club, Edwards stated he had not been actively seeking a move but chose Stevenage to experience League One football. He made his Stevenage debut on the first day of the 2011–12 season, playing the full 90 minutes in a 0–0 home draw against Exeter City. He went on to make 27 appearances during the first half of the season, of which 13 were starts.

=== Rochdale ===
Following Graham Westley's departure, Edwards fell out of favour under new Stevenage manager Gary Smith and joined Rochdale on 9 March 2012, on loan until the end of the 2011–12 season. The move reunited him with manager John Coleman, who had managed him for six years at Accrington. He made his Rochdale debut the following day, coming on as a 61st-minute substitute in a 2–2 draw against Huddersfield Town. His loan spell was limited to three appearances due to a knee injury. At the end of the season, Edwards was released by Stevenage upon the expiry of his contract. Ahead of the 2012–13 season, he signed a one-year permanent deal with Rochdale and featured regularly, making 49 appearances in all competitions as the club finished in mid-table in League One.

=== Burton Albion ===
Edwards opted to leave Rochdale after his first full season, signing for fellow League Two club Burton Albion on a free transfer on 29 June 2013. Upon signing, Burton manager Gary Rowett praised Edwards' experience and consistency, noting that at 27 he was well-positioned to continue progressing and become a key player for the club. Edwards made his Burton debut in their opening match of the 2013–14 season, a 2–2 draw with Cheltenham Town on 3 August 2013. He scored his first goal for the club in a 1–0 away victory at Exeter City on 26 October 2013. Edwards played regularly in defence throughout the first season, making 51 appearances and scoring two goals as Burton missed out on promotion, losing 1–0 to Fleetwood Town in the 2014 League Two play-off final.

He scored six goals in 50 appearances during the 2014–15 season as Burton finished the 2014–15 season as League Two champions. This included goals the final two matches of the season, victories against Northampton Town and Cambridge United, to secure the League Two title on the last day of the season. He was named in the League Two PFA Team of the Year and signed a new one-year contract with Burton on 8 May 2015. Edwards remained a regular in defence during the 2015–16 season, making 49 appearances in all competitions, as Burton finished second in League One, achieving back-to-back promotions to the Championship. Across three seasons with the club, he made 151 appearances, scored eight goals, and was described as earning "cult hero status" among the club's supporters.

==== Loan to Oxford United ====
After making just one appearance for Burton in the opening month of the 2016–17 season, Edwards joined League One club Oxford United on a season-long loan on 19 August 2016. Burton manager Nigel Clough stated that, although he was reluctant to loan out Edwards, it would have been "selfish" to keep him in the squad solely as cover for potential injuries. He debuted for Oxford the following day, playing the full match in a 2–1 victory against Peterborough United. His equalising goal away at Scunthorpe United on 26 November 2016 served as his first goal for the club, and he went on to score five times from right-back across 51 appearances that season. This included eight appearances in the EFL Trophy, where Oxford finished as runners-up after losing to Coventry City in the final at Wembley Stadium.

=== Bury ===
Released by Burton at the end of the season, Edwards signed a two-year contract with League One club Bury on 14 May 2017. He suffered a cartilage tear in his knee during pre-season and underwent surgery in July 2017. After recovering, Edwards made his Bury debut in a 0–0 draw against former club Rochdale on 26 August 2017. He made 42 appearances during the season as Bury were relegated to League Two after finishing in last place in the League One standings. Edwards made just three appearances during the 2018–19 season, all in the EFL Trophy, and left the club upon the expiry of his contract in June 2019.

=== Return to Accrington ===
Without a club at the start of the 2019–20 season, Edwards rejoined Accrington Stanley on a one-year contract on 1 August 2019. It was the third time Edwards had been signed by manager John Coleman, who described the signing as a "no risk" move. He made his first appearance back at Accrington as an 89th-minute substitute in the club's 2–1 victory over Milton Keynes Dons on 31 August 2019. Edwards played a peripheral role during the season, making eight appearances in all competitions before being released by Accrington in June 2020.

=== Warrington Town ===
Edwards signed for Northern Premier League club Warrington Town on 3 November 2020. Warrington's 2020–21 season was curtailed due to the COVID-19 pandemic before he made any first-team appearances.

== Style of play ==
Edwards was deployed in a number of positions throughout his career and his versatility to play across all defensive positions was highlighted as one of his strengths. At Stevenage, he was also used in a defensive midfield role, providing protection in front of the defence. He was a regular penalty taker at Accrington, scoring 16 goals from the penalty spot. Edwards was praised for his strong work ethic both in training and during matches.

== Career statistics ==
Appearances and goals by club, season and competition
Club	Season	League			FA Cup		League Cup		Other		Total	
Club	Season	Division	Apps	Goals	Apps	Goals	Apps	Goals	Apps	Goals	Apps	Goals
Wigan Athletic	2004–05	Championship	0	0	0	0	0	0	—		0	0
Wigan Athletic	2005–06	Premier League	0	0	0	0	0	0	—		0	0
Wigan Athletic	Total		0	0	0	0	0	0	0	0	0	0
Morecambe (loan)	2004–05	Conference National	1	0	0	0	—		0	0	1	0
Accrington Stanley	2005–06 (Note: Part of this season was spent on loan from Wigan Athletic)	Conference National	27	0	0	0	—		1 (Note: Appearance(s) in Football League Trophy)	0	28	0
Accrington Stanley	2006–07	League Two	33	1	1	0	2	0	3	0	39	1
Accrington Stanley	2007–08	League Two	31	1	0	0	0	0	1	0	32	1
Accrington Stanley	2008–09	League Two	46	0	2	0	1	0	1	0	50	0
Accrington Stanley	2009–10	League Two	46	8	5	0	2	0	4	1	57	9
Accrington Stanley	2010–11	League Two	44	13	2	0	2	0	3 (Note: One appearance in Football League Trophy; two appearances in 2011 League Two play-offs)	0	51	13
Accrington Stanley	Total		227	23	10	0	7	0	13	1	257	24
Stevenage	2011–12	League One	22	0	3	0	1	0	0	0	26	0
Rochdale	2011–12 (Note: This season was spent on loan from Stevenage) (Note: Soccerbase incorrectly credits several of Phil Edwards' Rochdale appearances to Matty Edwards)	League One	3	0	0	0	0	0	0	0	3	0
Rochdale	2012–13	League Two	44	0	2	0	1	0	2	0	49	0
Rochdale	Total		47	0	2	0	1	0	2	0	52	0
Burton Albion	2013–14	League Two	41	2	4	0	2	0	4	0	51	2
Burton Albion	2014–15	League Two	45	6	1	0	3	0	1	0	50	6
Burton Albion	2015–16	League One	46	0	1	0	2	0	0	0	49	0
Burton Albion	2016–17	Championship	0	0	0	0	1	0	—		1	0
Burton Albion	Total		132	8	6	0	8	0	5	0	151	8
Oxford United (loan)	2016–17	League One	38	3	5	1	0	0	8 (Note: Appearances in EFL Trophy)	1	51	5
Bury	2017–18	League One	37	0	2	0	0	0	3	0	42	0
Bury	2018–19	League Two	0	0	0	0	0	0	3	0	3	0
Bury	Total		37	0	2	0	0	0	6	0	45	0
Accrington Stanley	2019–20	League One	4	0	0	0	0	0	4	0	8	0
Warrington Town	2020–21	NPL Premier Division	0	0	0	0	—		0	0	0	0
Career total			508	34	28	1	17	0	38	2	591	37

== Honours ==
Accrington Stanley

- Conference National: 2005–06

Burton Albion

- Football League One second-place promotion: 2015–16
- Football League Two: 2014–15

Oxford United

- EFL Trophy runner-up: 2016–17

Individual

- Accrington Stanley Player of the Season: 2007–08, 2009–10
- PFA Team of the Year: 2014–15 League Two
