= Andrew Tutte =

English footballer

Personal information
- Full name: Andrew William Tutte
- Date of birth: 21 September 1990 (age 36)
- Place of birth: Huyton, England
- Height: 5 ft 9 in (1.75 m)
- Position: Midfielder

Team information
- Current team: Bolton Wanderers (U21 assistant coach)

Youth career
- 1999–2010: Manchester City

Senior career*
Years	Team	Apps	(Gls)
2010–2011	Manchester City	0	(0)
2010	→ Rochdale (loan)	7	(0)
2010–2011	→ Shrewsbury Town (loan)	2	(0)
2011	→ Yeovil Town (loan)	15	(2)
2011–2014	Rochdale	88	(10)
2014–2018	Bury	116	(9)
2018–2020	Morecambe	30	(2)
2020–2026	Bolton Wanderers	19	(0)
Total		277	(24)

International career
2009	England U19	5	(0)
2009	England U20	1	(0)

Managerial career
- 2025: Bolton Wanderers (joint caretaker)
- * Club domestic league appearances and goals

Andrew William Tutte (born 21 September 1990) is an English former professional footballer who played as a midfielder. He played in the English Football League for Rochdale, Shrewsbury Town, Yeovil Town, Bury, Morecambe, and Bolton Wanderers. He is currently the assistant coach for the Bolton Wanderers U21 team, having finished his career there as a player/coach.

== Club career ==
=== Early career ===
Born in Huyton, Merseyside, Tutte began his youth career at Manchester City in 1999, where he came through the ranks and starred for the club's FA Youth Cup team. On 9 July 2010, Tutte signed a one-year contract extension to keep him at the club for the following year at which time the club announced he would be loaned out for the next season in order to provide him with first-team experience.

==== Loan spells ====
Loaned out to Rochdale of League One, he made his debut on 21 August 2010 coming on as a substitute for Joe Thompson in a League One game against Colchester United. On 28 August 2010 in a match against Brentford which Rochdale won 3–1, Tutte provided assists for Anthony Elding and Jason Kennedy. Tutte made his last appearance for the club as a substitute for Jason Kennedy in a 1–0 loss against Exeter City after which he was recalled by his parent club having made nine appearances for Rochdale.

Having been recalled, Tutte made an appearance for the reserves where he played 90 minutes against their city rivals Manchester United in a 1–1 draw.

After the game, he went out on loan to Shrewsbury Town dropping down to League Two on 25 November 2010; the deadline date for loans and free transfers. Following the move, Tutte stated he wanted to use his time at Shrewsbury to impress his parent club. After not being used for a month, Tutte made his debut on 1 January 2011 against Burton Albion in a 0–0 draw where he played 90 minutes, playing again two days later on 3 January 2011 in a 1-0 loss to Crewe Alexandra, his last appearance before returning to his parent club.

After returning to his parent club, on 1 February 2011 Tutte was sent out on loan to Yeovil Town until the end of the season . On 15 February 2011, Tutte made his debut for the club in a 2–0 loss to Peterborough United playing 90 minutes. At Yeovil, Tutte became a regular starter scoring his first professional league goal on 25 April 2011, in a 2–2 draw against Peterborough, scoring his second goal and providing an assist for Andy Welsh in a 4–2 win over Colchester Unitedon 30 April 2011. His last appearance for Yeovil was against Carlisle United in a 2–0 win when he came on as a substitute for Ed Upson. At the end of the season, Yeovil Town expected to resign Tutte ahead of the 2011–12 season, with manager Terry Skiverton describing his performance over his loan period as "outstanding". The move collapsed, following talks with his agent.

=== Rochdale ===
At the end of the 2010–11 season he was released by Manchester City at the expiration of his contract. Following his release, four teams battled for his signature; his three previous loan clubs and Scunthorpe United, Rochdale winning when, on 24 June 2011, he signed a two-year deal, joining along with Simon Hackney . His decision to move to Rochdale was influenced by the chance to work with new Manager Steve Eyre following their time together at Manchester City. Tutte published his reasons for signing on the club website; "I'm made up to be coming back at Spotland and back working with Steve, I cannot wait to meet the rest of the lads and get back in training. I really enjoyed my loan spell here, it was a very good learning experience for me and the club is certainly moving in the right direction and I would love to be a part of the team that goes one better than last season. Steve knows how to get the best out of me, there will be plenty of competition for places and that means you stay on top of your game. When you get the opportunity you have to be ready to take it and I'll be working hard to earn my place in the team."

Tutte made his second debut for the club on 6 August 2011, in a 2–0 loss against Sheffield Wednesday before coming off for Chris O'Grady. On 10 September 2011, he provided an assist for Ashley Grimes to score an opener in a 4–2 win over Bury and on 6 March 2012, he provided an assist for Jason Kennedy to score the only goal in a match against Carlisle which they lost 2–1. On 10 March 2012, Tutte scored his first goal for the club with a strike in a 2–2 draw against Huddersfield Town, a goal which was the Goal of the Season at Rochdale's end-of-season awards. By the end of the season he had made 40 appearances, scoring once, but could not save the club and they were relegated after losing 2–1 against Chesterfield, manager Eyre being sacked six months into the season with the club in 22nd place in the league.

Following the 2011–12 season, the club revealed Tutte would remain under contract for the next season and extended his contract to two years.

Tutte scored his first goal of the season 2012–13 in the first round of the League Cup, in a 4–3 loss against Barnsley. while in the league, he scored twice in his first four appearances. In October 2012, Tutte was nominated for September's Player of the Month award in League Two but would lose to Port Vale's Tom Pope. Tutte continued to be a regular in the first team despite a change in management with Keith Hill returning as Manager. Towards the end of the season, Tutte suffered a knee injury putting him out for the rest of the season. By the end of the season, Tutte would make thirty appearances and score seven resulting in a new two-year deal in in late April.

In the 2013–14 season, Tutte started the season well scoring in a 2–2 draw against Chesterfield on 17 August 2013 and another on 28 November 2013, in a 3–1 win over Exeter City. However, his first team opportunities were limited under Manager Hill and he was released by the club on 23 January 2014.

=== Bury ===
Tutte joined Bury on a free transfer on 24 January 2014 and made his debut on 1 February 2014, playing 90 minutes in a 1–0 win over Wycombe Wanderers. Tutte scored his first goal for the club on 18 April 2014, in a 4–0 win over Plymouth Argyle. At the end of the season, in which Tutte had become a first team regular, he had his contract extended when the club took up an option to extend his contract to the end of the 2014–15 season.

In his second season at Bury, Tutte continued to be a regular in the first-team under the management of David Flitcroft, scoring his first goal of the season in a FA Cup first round 3–1 win over Hemel Hempstead Town on 8 November 2014. Tutte then scored two goals in two games, in a 2–2 draw against York City on 20 December 2014 and in a 3–2 win over Northampton Town on 26 December 2014. Tutte scored his first goal in two months on 21 February 2015, in a 1–0 win over Hartlepool United. Two days after scoring against Hartlepool United, Tutte signed a two-year contract extension, keeping him under contract until 2017. Manager Flitcroft expressed satisfaction at Tutte's decision to sign saying he believed the player would help make Bury a better team. He was released by Bury at the end of the 2017–18 season.

=== Morecambe ===
Following his release by relegated Bury, Tutte signed for fellow League Two club Morecambe on 29 June 2018 on a two-year contract. Tutte was made available to find a new club in January 2020 due to limited first-team opportunities and was released in June 2020.

=== Bolton Wanderers ===
On 3 September 2020 Tutte signed for newly relegated League Two team Bolton Wanderers on a one-year contract after a successful trial and after having turned down League One team Accrington Stanley. Assigned the number 18 shirt, he made his debut on 12 September, coming on as a late substitute for Tom White in a 0–1 home defeat against Forest Green Rovers in Bolton's first EFL League Two match of the 2020–21 season. On 28 May 2021, he signed a new one-year contract but only played once in the 2021–22 season having picked up a season-ending injury whilst playing for the reserves in September 2021. On 3 May 2022, the club confirmed he would be released at the end of his contract. On 14 June 2022, it was announced he would remain at the club as a player/coach for Bolton's B team. This continued into a second season, with Tutte receiving praise in his work helipng to develop players whilst playing alongside them. A year later, it was extended for a third season. On 22 January 2025, after manager Ian Evatt left the club by mutual consent; Tutte, Andy Taylor, and Julian Darby were named as joint caretaker managers. Their first game in charge was a 1–0 away win against Huddersfield Town, which brought an end to Huddersfield's 16-match unbeaten run. They took charge of one more match, a 3–1 home win against Northampton Town, before Steven Schumacher was hired as Evatt's replacement on 30 January. They returned to their youth/B team roles with a 100% winning record as caretakers. Tutte played the full 90 minutes in the 2025 Lancashire Senior Cup final, with Bolton B beating Burnley's reserves. For the 2026–27 season he was listed as only a coach, rather than a player/coach, quietly bringing his playing career to its end.

== International career ==
Tutte has represented England at under-19 and under-20 levels.

== Career statistics ==
Appearances and goals by club, season and competition
Club	Season	League			FA Cup		League Cup		Other		Total	
Club	Season	Division	Apps	Goals	Apps	Goals	Apps	Goals	Apps	Goals	Apps	Goals
Manchester City	2009–10	Premier League	0	0	0	0	0	0	—		0	0
Manchester City	2010–11	Premier League	0	0	0	0	—		0	0	0	0
Manchester City	Total		0	0	0	0	0	0	0	0	0	0
Rochdale (loan)	2010–11	League One	7	0	—		1	0	1 (Note: Appearance(s) in Football League Trophy)	0	9	0
Shrewsbury Town (loan)	2010–11	League Two	2	0	—		—		—		2	0
Yeovil Town (loan)	2010–11	League One	15	2	—		—		—		15	2
Rochdale	2011–12	League One	40	1	1	0	3	0	1	0	45	1
Rochdale	2012–13	League Two	37	7	2	0	1	1	2	0	42	8
Rochdale	2013–14	League Two	11	2	1	0	1	0	1	0	14	2
Rochdale	Total		88	10	4	0	5	1	4	0	101	11
Bury	2013–14	League Two	19	1	—		—		—		19	1
Bury	2014–15	League Two	42	3	3	1	1	0	2	0	48	4
Bury	2015–16	League One	22	4	3	0	2	0	1	1	28	5
Bury	2016–17	League One	17	1	2	0	0	0	2	0	21	1
Bury	2017–18	League One	16	0	2	0	1	0	2	0	21	0
Bury	Total		116	9	10	1	4	0	7	1	137	11
Morecambe	2018–19	League Two	18	2	2	0	0	0	1	0	21	2
Morecambe	2019–20	League Two	12	1	1	0	0	0	1	0	14	1
Morecambe	Total		30	2	3	0	0	0	2	1	35	3
Bolton Wanderers	2020–21	League Two	19	0	1	0	0	0	0	0	20	0
Bolton Wanderers	2021–22	League One	0	0	0	0	0	0	1	0	1	0
Bolton Wanderers	2022–23	League One	0	0	0	0	0	0	0	0	0	0
Bolton Wanderers	2023–24	League One	0	0	0	0	0	0	0	0	0	0
Bolton Wanderers	2024–25	League One	0	0	0	0	0	0	0	0	0	0
Bolton Wanderers	2025–26	League One	0	0	0	0	0	0	0	0	0	0
Bolton Wanderers	Total		19	0	1	0	0	0	1	0	21	0
Career total			277	24	18	1	10	1	15	1	320	27

== Honours ==
Manchester City

- FA Youth Cup: 2007-08

Bury

- Football League Two third-place promotion: 2014–15

England U19

- UEFA European Under-19 Championship runner-up: 2009

Bolton Wanderers

- EFL League Two third-place promotion: 2020–21

Bolton Wanderers B

- Lancashire Senior Cup: 2024–25
