= Mafia bibliography =

This page lists books about mafia organizations all over the world:

== Cosa Nostra ==
- Dickie, John (8 March 2007). Cosa Nostra: A History of the Sicilian Mafia: A History of the Sicilian Mafia. Hodder & Stoughton. ISBN 978-1-84894-055-0.
- Jacobs, James B.; Panarella, Christopher; Worthington, Jay (1 October 1996). Busting the Mob: United States V. Cosa Nostra. NYU Press. ISBN 978-0-8147-4230-3.
- Sinai, Tamir (29 November 2007). "Terror at Midday" - The Cosa Nostra as a terrorist organisation. GRIN Verlag. ISBN 978-3-638-86833-4.
- Anderson, Annelise Graebner (1979). The Business of Organized Crime: A Cosa Nostra Family. Hoover Press. ISBN 978-0-8179-7013-0.

== Mafia ==
- Gambetta, Diego (1996). The Sicilian Mafia: The Business of Private Protection. Harvard University Press. ISBN 978-0-674-80742-6.
- Lupo, Salvatore (13 August 2013). History of the Mafia. Columbia University Press. ISBN 978-0-231-50539-0.
- Seindal, René (1 January 1998). Mafia: Money and Politics in Sicily, 1950-1997. Museum Tusculanum Press. ISBN 978-87-7289-455-3.
- Leonetti, Phil (29 April 2014). Mafia Prince: Inside America's Most Violent Crime Family and the Bloody Fall of La Cosa Nostra. Running Press Book Publishers. ISBN 978-0-7624-5431-0.
- Zaidi, S. Hussain; Borges, Jane (2011). Mafia Queens of Mumbai. Westland. ISBN 978-93-80283-77-7.
- Paoli, Letizia (23 October 2003). Mafia Brotherhoods : Organized Crime, Italian Style: Organized Crime, Italian Style. Oxford University Press, USA. ISBN 978-0-19-534808-8.
- Sifakis, Carl (2005). The Mafia Encyclopedia. Infobase Publishing. ISBN 978-0-8160-6989-7.
- Rafael, Tony (10 October 2013). The Mexican Mafia. Encounter Books. ISBN 978-1-59403-273-8.
- Siebert, Renate (1996). Secrets of Life and Death: Women and the Mafia. Verso. ISBN 978-1-85984-023-8.
- Fiandaca, Giovanni (4 September 2007). Women and the Mafia: Female Roles in Organized Crime Structures. Springer Science & Business Media. ISBN 978-0-387-36542-8.
- Hess, Henner (1998). Mafia & Mafiosi: Origin, Power and Myth. NYU Press. ISBN 978-1-86333-143-2.
- Pickering-Iazzi, Robin (2007). Mafia and Outlaw Stories from Italian Life and Literature. University of Toronto Press. ISBN 978-0-8020-9561-9.
- Pickering-Iazzi, Robin. (2015). The Mafia in Italian Lives and Literature: Life Sentences and Their Geographies. University of Toronto Press. 978-1-4426-2908-0.
- Finckenauer, James O.; Waring, Elin J. (January 1998). Russian Mafia in America: Immigration, Culture, and Crime. UPNE. ISBN 978-1-55553-374-8.
- Merico, Marisa (20 May 2010). Mafia Princess. HarperCollins Publishers. ISBN 978-0-00-733205-2.
- Larke-Walsh, George S. (6 April 2010). Screening the Mafia: Masculinity, Ethnicity and Mobsters from The Godfather to The Sopranos. McFarland. ISBN 978-0-7864-5613-0.
- O'Connor, D'Arcy (21 March 2011). Montreal's Irish Mafia: The True Story of the Infamous West End Gang. John Wiley & Sons. ISBN 978-0-470-67615-8.
- Alt, Betty L.; Wells, Sandra K. (May 2008). Mountain Mafia: Organized Crime in the Rockies. Dog Ear Publishing. ISBN 978-1-58385-274-3.
- Cedilot, Andre; Noel, Andre (18 October 2011). Mafia Inc.: The Long, Bloody Reign of Canada's Sicilian Clan. Random House of Canada. ISBN 978-0-307-36042-7.
- Burnstein, Scott M. (18 September 2012). Motor City Mafia:: A Century of Organized Crime in Detroit. Arcadia Publishing. ISBN 978-1-4396-3310-6.
- Rudolph, Robert (1 July 1994). Mafia Wiseguys: The Mob That Took on the Feds. SP Books. ISBN 978-1-56171-195-6.
- Orlando, Leoluca (2003). Fighting the Mafia and Renewing Sicilian Culture. Encounter Books. ISBN 978-1-893554-81-8.
- Schneider, Peter T.; Schneider, Jane C. (11 February 2003). Reversible Destiny: Mafia, Antimafia, and the Struggle for Palermo. University of California Press. ISBN 978-0-520-92949-4.
- Roemer, William F. Jr. (1989). Roemer: Man Against the Mob (First Ballantine Books ed.). Ivy Books. ISBN 0-8041-0718-1.
- Pileggi, Nicholas (1995). Casino: Love and Honor in Las Vegas. Simon & Schuster. ISBN 0-684-80832-3.
- Coen, Jeff (2009). Family Secrets: The Case That Crippled the Chicago Mob. Chicago Review Press. ISBN 978-1-55652-781-4.
