= Malcolm Roberts (singer) =

English singer (1944–2003)

- Born: Malcolm James Roberts; 31 March 1944; Blackley, Manchester, England
- Died: 7 February 2003 (aged 58); Addlestone, Surrey, England
- Burial place: St. Nicholas Churchyard, Remenham, Berkshire, England
- Education: Manchester School of Music and Drama
- Occupations: Actor, traditional pop singer, songwriter
- Years active: 1957–2003
- Known for: Eurovision Song Contest 1985; A Song for Europe (1991)
- Spouse: Chérie Tatman (m. 1975; died 2001)
- Partner(s): Pamela Todd; Susie
- Children: 1

Malcolm James Roberts (31 March 1944 – 7 February 2003) was an English actor, traditional pop singer and songwriter. With a career that spanned over four decades, he was best known for representing Luxembourg in the Eurovision Song Contest 1985 and attempting to represent the United Kingdom in A Song for Europe in 1991.

Roberts enjoyed three hit singles on the UK singles chart from 1967 to 1969.

== Early life ==
Malcolm James Roberts was born in Blackley, Manchester, England on 31 March 1944, as the younger child to James "Jim" Roberts and his wife, Doris (née Ogden). He had an elder sister, Jean "Jeannie" McLeod (née Roberts).

Roberts attended Crosslee Primary School and Moss House Secondary School. He passed the entrance exam and was enrolled at the Manchester School of Music and Drama in 1957, at the age of 13, where he studied opera and acting. He played the trumpet in the National Youth Orchestra. He became a member of the Blackley Brass Band. He first showed an interest in singing in primary school, when he would compete with another boy in assembly every morning to see who could sing the hymns the loudest.

== Career ==
Roberts worked a variety of jobs, including as a bouncer at some Soho clubs, selling ice creams, in a leather goods shop, and as the manager at a nightclub called The Zebra. While working as a bouncer in London, he was attacked and ended up at Charing Cross Hospital. He said: "I was beaten up, but I got four guys first."

=== Acting ===
Roberts started in the entertainment industry as an actor at the age of 13, in Showboat. He had a small role in the ITV soap opera Coronation Street. His work as Tony in the Ashton-Under-Line Operatic Society's production of West Side Story led to the role of Eric Dooley in the Lionel Bart musical Maggie May at the Adelphi Theatre in 1964, gaining his first public recognition.

Roberts played Boy in Play of the Week: The Rivals, which was broadcast on 17 May 1970.

Roberts later appeared in pantomime. He starred opposite Ronnie Corbett and Clodagh Rodgers in the 1971 production of Cinderella at the London Palladium. In 1982, he performed in Robinson Crusoe, this time in Eastbourne, and in 1984, he performed in Goldilocks and the Three Bears in Bournemouth. He also starred in a musical at the Birmingham Repertory Theatre, based on the life of Joan of Arc, which run for several weeks.

Roberts took part in a different theatrical show in 1996, at The Café Royal in London. In the show, titled Joey & Gina's Wedding, the audience became the guests at the wedding and reception and he took the part of the Irish priest who was officiating at the ceremony.

=== Football ===
Roberts enjoyed football. He regularly played with the Manchester Northern team and was invited to join Manchester City Colts. He also played a few games with City's reserve team but decided that his career in music would come first. He supported Manchester City F.C. throughout his life.

In his 1989 autobiography, Kicked into Touch, Roberts' school friend, footballer and manager Fred Eyre, dedicated a chapter to the antics the pair got up to in primary school.

=== Music ===
Roberts appeared as the singer on several television shows. He appeared on three episodes of International Cabaret in December 1966, February 1967 and November 1968. He appeared on three episodes of BBC Show of the Week in May 1967, October 1968 and June 1970. He appeared on Miss World 1967. He appeared on Dance Date: The Star United Kingdom Ballroom Dancing Championships in February 1968. He appeared on an episode of the BBC Television sketch show The Morecambe & Wise Show in August 1969. He appeared on Crackerjack in December 1969. He appeared on two episodes of The Kenneth Williams Show in February and March 1970. He appeared on The Young Generation in March 1970. He appeared on Music My Way in August 1973. He appeared on Moods of Love in September 1973.

Roberts first single, a cover of the 1967 single by the American pop singer Connie Francis, "Time Alone Will Tell", reached number 45 in May 1967. This was followed in November 1968, by the hit "May I Have the Next Dream With You", which reached number 8 and stayed on the chart for 15 weeks. He had another hit, "Love is All", written by Les Reed and Barry Mason, in November 1969, which reached number 12.

Roberts was the special guest singer at the 1968 Mużika Mużika, known as the Malta Song Festival, held at the Plaza Theatre in Sliema, Malta on 7 December 1968.

Roberts won, as a performer, the IV International Music Festival in Rio de Janeiro, and the song attained third place in the Festival in 1969. According to the sleeve note of his 2001 retrospective CD collection, his recording career continued in Brazil, where he had an affectionate reception and scored many hits.

Roberts appeared in concerts and numerous television shows in May 1970. He was in demand worldwide, and went to Las Vegas, New York City, and Hong Kong. He also went to South America, and did shows in Peru, Puerto Rico, Bermuda, and Brazil.

Roberts, Penny Lane and Union Express went to The European Song Festival, in which groups of singers from different countries competed, after returning to England, in 1972. This English group won the contest.

Roberts was also a songwriter. He collaborated with Sammy Cahn, Les Reed and Lynsey de Paul, as well as writing incidental music for the ITV dramatisation of Lady Chatterley's Lover.

Roberts was signed to numerous record labels throughout his career, including; RCA Records, Major Minor Records, Columbia Records, Buk Records, and Right Recordings.

=== Television ===
Roberts appeared as a guest on two episodes of Dee Time in 1967.

Roberts appeared on Festival in Rio, a BBC Two television film about on The European Song Festival, broadcast on 14 February 1970. He appeared on American television on 6 November 1970, via the NBC talk show The Tonight Show Starring Johnny Carson.

Roberts appeared at the Golden Seaswallow Awards 1972.

Roberts took part in a special edition of the game show It's a Celebrity Knockout. The episode was broadcast on 31 August 1981.

=== Eurovision ===
Roberts represented Luxembourg at the Eurovision Song Contest 1985. The song, "Children, Kinder, Enfants", was written by Ralph Siegel, Bernd Meinunger and Jean-Michel Beriat, all of whom were Eurovision Song Contest entries before; Siegel and Meinunger having written the 1982 winner for West Germany. The group consisted of an international line-up of the UK's Roberts and Ireen Sheer, Dutch singer Margo (Annemieke Verdoorn), native Luxembourgian Franck Olivier, German Chris Roberts, and American Diane Solomon. The song was performed mainly in French, with a counterpane sung in English and German. They received 37 points and finished in 13th place.

Roberts tried to represent the United Kingdom in Eurovision: You Decide in 1991. He performed his own composition, "One Love", alone, but finished last in the A Song for Europe contest, which was hosted by Terry Wogan.

Roberts became the second entrant in a British national final to have participated in Eurovision for another nation, after Dan Duskey, known as Michael Palace, in 1986.

== Personal life ==
Roberts married Chérie Gillian Tatman, who was five years his senior, in Redbridge, London in July 1975. Their only child, a son, Oliver, was born in April 1995. The couple separated shortly after their son's birth and were still legally married at the time of Tatman's death, in the London Borough of Newham, on 28 December 2001, aged 63.

Roberts was in a long-time relationship with Pamela Todd, a former model and the ex-wife of Ken Todd—husband of Lisa Vanderpump—and mother of Warren Todd, a businessman.

== Death ==
Roberts died from a heart attack in Addlestone, Surrey, on 7 February 2003. He was 58. He was found collapsed at the wheel of his car in the car park of Runnymede Borough Council's offices, near Chertsey. His recording manager, David Landau, said: "He was on the road in his car and pulled over to the side when he began to feel unwell. He apparently had a massive heart attack." A spokesperson for Surrey Police said: "We were called at just after 3pm, last Friday, about a man having a heart attack in the car park of Runnymede Borough Council offices. He was taken to St. Peter's Hospital, [Chertsey], where he was pronounced dead. This is not being treated as a police matter, as he died of natural causes."

Roberts was survived by his son Oliver and his girlfriend, Susie.

Roberts was buried at St. Nicholas Churchyard, also known as Remenham Cemetery, in Remenham, Berkshire, on 20 February 2003, following his funeral service, which took place in Henley-on-Thames in Oxfordshire. About 200 people, including family, friends and fans, were in attendance.

== Discography ==
=== Studio albums ===
- Mr. Roberts (1968)
- Malcolm (1969)
- The Voice of Malcolm Roberts (1970)
- Sounds Like Malcolm Roberts (1971)
- Living for Life (1973)

=== Live albums ===
- Live at the Talk of the Town (1974)

=== Compilation albums ===
- This is Malcolm Roberts (1980)
- The Best of the EMI Years (1993)
- The Essential Malcolm Roberts (2000)

=== Posthumous releases ===
- The Very Best of Malcolm Roberts (2003)
- Rio (2003)
- Lost and Found (2021)
