= Ashley Grimes (footballer, born 1986) =

English footballer (born 1986)

Personal information
- Full name: Ashley James Grimes
- Date of birth: 9 December 1986 (age 39)
- Place of birth: Swinton, England
- Height: 1.78 m (5 ft 10 in)
- Position: Attacking midfielder

Youth career
- Manchester United
- –2003: Bolton Wanderers
- 2003–2006: Manchester City

Senior career*
Years	Team	Apps	(Gls)
2006–2008	Manchester City	0	(0)
2007	→ Swindon Town (loan)	4	(0)
2008–2011	Millwall	21	(2)
2010–2011	→ Lincoln City (loan)	27	(15)
2011–2013	Rochdale	74	(18)
2013–2014	Bury	15	(0)
2014–2015	Walsall	27	(2)
2015–2016	Barrow	17	(1)
2016–2017	Southport	18	(1)
2017–2018	Edinburgh City	29	(5)
Total		232	(44)
- * Club domestic league appearances and goals

Ashley James Grimes (born 9 December 1986) is an English former professional footballer who played as an attacking midfielder.

Born in Swinton, Greater Manchester, he began his career as a youth player with Manchester United. After a spell with Bolton Wanderers, he joined Manchester City in 2003. He turned professional in 2006 but struggled to break into the first team and went on loan to Swindon Town in 2007 then moved to Millwall a year later. He spent the 2010–11 season on loan with Lincoln City before a permanent transfer to Rochdale at the end of the season. After two seasons with Rochdale, he moved to Bury in 2013 and then Walsall a year later. In July 2015 he signed for Barrow.

== Club career ==
=== Manchester City ===
Born in Swinton, Greater Manchester, Grimes began his footballing career with Barr Hill Lads' Club in Salford before signing for Manchester United where he spent two years in the academy before signing for Bolton Wanderers.

Grimes was released by Bolton at the age of 16 and went on trial at Manchester City, resulting in him signing his first full-time contract as a trainee with the club in 2006, though he made no appearances for Manchester City. He joined Swindon Town on a one-month loan on 23 March 2007. Grimes made his debut for the club, coming on as a late substitute, in a 3–2 win against Lincoln City on 25 March 2007. He went on to make four substitute appearances for Swindon Town. In May 2007, following his loan spell at the club ended, Grimes signed a professional contract with Manchester City. At the end of the 2007–08 season, he was released by the club.

=== Millwall ===
It announced on 22 May 2008 that Grimes joined Millwall on a free transfer and was linked with up his former manager, Kenny Jackett.

He made his debut for the club, starting a match and played 45 minutes before being substituted at half time, in a 1–0 loss against Colchester United in the Football League Trophy, resulting in Millwall's elimination from the tournament. Throughout the 2008–09 season, Grimes' playing at Millwall mostly came from the substitute bench. He scored his first senior goal in the 3–0 win at Chester City in the first round of the FA Cup on 9 November 2008. Three weeks later on 29 November 2008, Grimes scored his second goal for the club, in a 3–0 win against Aldershot Town in the second round of the FA Cup. His impressive display at Millwall earned a new contract with the club, which keep him until 2011. He scored his first league goal in a 3–1 victory away at Cheltenham Town, after the team had gone 1–0 down due to an own goal. This was followed up by scoring in a next match against Oldham Athletic, losing 3–2. Grimes had been the fan favourite when the supporters chant "I say, I say, I say, I say – Ashley, Ashley!", which is reference of former Coronation Street butcher Fred Elliott. At the end of the 2008–09 season, he went on to make twenty–one appearances and scoring four times in all competitions.

The 2009–10 season saw Grimes first team opportunities limited, due to competitions and his own injury concerns. His potential move to Crawley Town was blocked by Manager Kenny Jackett, citing injury situation at the club. Despite this, he played a role of assisting two goals in two matches between 9 December 2009 and 12 December 2009, coming against Walsall and Staines Town. At the end of the 2009–10 season, Grimes went on to make eight appearances in all competitions.

At the end of the 2010–2011 season Grimes was released after his contract expired with the club.

==== Lincoln City (loan) ====
Having made no appearances for Millwall since the 2010–11 season, Grimes joined Lincoln City on loan for a month. He made his debut for the club on 30 October 2010, coming on as a late substitute, in a 2–2 draw away at Wycombe Wanderers. Two weeks later on 13 November 2010, Grimes scored his first goal for Lincoln City, in a 2–1 win against Morecambe. Two weeks later on 27 November 2010, he scored his second goal for the club, in a 2–2 draw against Hereford United. By late-November, Grimes' loan spell with the club was extended until January, before it was extended until the end of the season.

He scored his third goal for Lincoln City, in a 2–1 win against Bradford City on 1 January 2011. Grimes later scored five more goals later in January, including a hat-trick against Stockport County in a 4–3 away win. His goal scoring form continued throughout February, as he scored four times, including a brace against Morecambe on 12 February 2011. Grimes, once again, added four more goals throughout March, including another brace against Southend United on 12 March 2011. However, he was unable to help the club avoid relegation following a 3–0 loss against Aldershot Town in the last game of the season. For his performance, Grimes was awarded Lincoln City's Player of the Season. Throughout the 2010–11 season, he established himself in the starting eleven for the club, playing as a striker. At the end of the 2010–11 season, Grimes went on to make thirty appearances and scoring seventeen times in all competitions, making him Lincoln City's top scorer.

As the 2010–11 season progressed, both Grimes and the manager, Steve Tilson, wished to make the deal permanent. However, Grimes' future with Lincoln City appears to be uncertain following Lincoln City relegation to the Non-League Football Conference and previously stated of ruling out playing in League Two ahead of the 2011–12 season.

=== Rochdale ===
Despite being linked with a move to Colchester United, Grimes signed a two-year contract with League One side Rochdale on a free transfer after his contract had expired at Millwall. Upon joining the club, he expressed excitement at working with Steve Eyre, saying: "I have agreed to sign and I'm very pleased to be linking up with Steve Eyre once again".

Grimes made his debut for Rochdale in a 2–0 loss against Sheffield Wednesday in the opening game of the season. This was followed up by bagging a brace in the club's 3–2 win after extra time against Chesterfield in the League Cup on 9 August 2011. Four days later on 13 August 2011, he scored his first league goal for Rochdale, in a 2–2 draw against Huddersfield Town. Grimes' goal scoring form continued when he scored three times throughout September. Grimes then scored a brace, in a 2–1 win against Wycombe Wanderers on 1 October 2011. In a follow–up match, he scored one of Rochdale's penalty kicks to beat Walsall 3–1 in a penalty shootout following 120 minutes match in the second round of the EFL Trophy. Since joining the club, Grimes became a first team regular for the side, becoming Rochdale's first choice striker. However, his struggle to score goals soon became a subject of criticism, leading Manager Eyre to defend him. This lasted until on 30 January 2012 when he scored twice for the club, in a 3–0 win against Bury to end the drought. Grimes' next goal came on 10 March 2012, in a 2–2 draw against Huddersfield Town. However, Rochdale were eventually relegated to League Two after finishing 24th place in the league, in which he played under manager Eyre and John Coleman. At the end of the 2011–12 season, Grimes went on to make forty–two appearances and scoring eleven times in all competitions.

Ahead of the 2012–13 season, Grimes was linked with a move to League One side Crawley Town, but Manager Coleman insists that the player was happy at Rochdale. He then turned down a move to Crawley Town, having enjoyed playing under Manager Coleman's management style. Grimes then scored his first goal of the season, in a 2–0 win against Barnet on 1 September 2012. He scored two goals in two matches between 6 October 2012 and 9 October 2012 against Accrington Stanley and Bury. However, the next two months saw Grimes produce a slow goal-scoring form and lack of playing for recent week, having featured with cameo appearances from the bench. After being on the bench for the next two matches, he scored two goals in two consecutive games against Aldershot Town and Cheltenham Town. Grimes scored two goals in two consecutive matches against Bradford City and Rotherham United. For his performance, he was nominated for League Two December Player of the Month award and eventually won. However, Grimes' goal scoring form began to fade and scoring ten goals, just behind Bobby Grant, who scored sixteen. At the end of the 2012–2013 season, he went on to make forty–one appearances and scoring eleven times in all competitions. Following this, Grimes was among eight players to be released by the club.

=== Bury ===
After leaving Rochdale, Grimes originally agreed to sign for Cheltenham Town; however, while travelling to sign his contract with the club, he received a phone call from Bury, and chose to join them instead, signing a two-year deal. He was previously linked with a move to Rotherham United. Upon joining the club, Grimes was given a number ten shirt.

He made his debut for Bury in the opening game of the season against Chesterfield, starting a match and played 60 minutes before being substituted, in a 2–0 loss. However, Grimes struggled in the first team, having been overshadowed by strikers and his own injury concern. He also had a fallen out with manager Ronnie Jepson. At the end of the 2013–14 season, Grimes went on to make 18 appearances in all competitions. Following this, he was placed on the transfer list. Two months later on 24 July 2014, it was announced by the club that Grimes left Bury by mutual consent.

=== Walsall ===
On 25 July 2014 – the following day after having left Bury – it was confirmed that Grimes has signed a one-year deal with Walsall. Upon joining the club, he was given a number twenty–four shirt.

Grimes made his debut for the Saddlers in a 1–1 draw against Port Vale in their first game of the season on 9 August 2014. After making his debut for the club, teammate Tom Bradshaw praised his performance. Since joining Walsall, however, Grimes struggled to receive his place in the first team, as well as, scoring goals. Along the way, he also suffered injuries. On 1 February 2015, Grimes scored his first goal since April 2013 in a 1–1 home draw against Gillingham. After the match, Manager Dean Smith praised his performance. A month later on 17 March 2015, he scored his second goal for the club, in a 1–1 draw against Sheffield United. At the end of the 2014–15 season, Grimes made thirty–six appearances and scoring two times in all competitions.

Having failed to meet the expectations under the management of Smith, he were among four players to be released by Walsall in May 2015.

=== Barrow ===
After being released by Walsall, Grimes joined Barrow on 16 July 2015, signing a two–year contract with the club. He previously turned down moves to clubs from League Two and a National League.

Grimes made his debut for Barrow in the opening game of the season against Dover Athletic, starting a match and played 62 minutes before being substituted, in a 2–1 win. Despite facing high expectations since joining the club, he struggled to break into the first team and found his playing time, mostly from the substitute bench. Grimes also struggled with injuries throughout the 2015–16 season. Having failed to score goals, his first goal for Barrow came on 23 January 2016 against Welling United, in a 2–1 win. At the end of the 2015–16 season, he went on to make seventeen appearances and scoring once in all competitions.

=== Southport ===
In June 2016, Grimes left Barrow and joined Southport.

He made his debut for the club, coming on as a 62nd-minute substitute, in a 3–0 loss against Dagenham & Redbridge in the opening game of the season. Two weeks later on 16 August 2016, Grimes scored his first goal for Southport, in a 3–1 loss against Macclesfield Town. In a follow–up match against Lincoln City, he received a straight red card for kicking out at Alex Woodyard after 35 minutes, as Southport lost 4–0. After serving a three match suspension, Grimes returned to the starting line–up against his former club, Barrow on 13 September 2016, losing 4–0. Two months later on 15 November 2016, he scored his second goal for the club, in a 4–1 loss against Fleetwood Town in the first round of the FA Cup. Having struggled to break into the first team and found his playing time, mostly from the substitute bench, Grimes went on to make seventeen appearances and scoring two times in all competitions.

=== Edinburgh City ===
In the summer of 2017, Grimes left Southport to join Scottish League Two side Edinburgh City.

He made his debut for the club against Berwick Rangers in the Scottish League Cup and scored twice, as Edinburgh City won 4–2 in the penalty shootout following a 2–2 draw throughout the 120 minutes. A week later on 25 July 2017, Grimes scored his goal for the club in a Scottish League Cup match, in a 2–1 loss against Motherwell. Two months later on 9 September 2017, he scored his fourth goal for Edinburgh City, in a 1–0 win against Berwick Rangers. Grimes later scored five more goals, including a brace against Annan Athletic on 27 January 2008. He later helped the club avoid relegation in the Scottish League Two after a 1–1 draw against Elgin City on 14 April 2018. Throughout the 2017–18 season, Grimes established himself as the Edinburgh City's first choice striker. At the end of the 2017–18 season, he went on to make thirty–five appearances and scoring eight times in all competitions. Following this, Grimes left the club by mutual consent.

== Personal life ==
Grimes is married and has two children. He resided in Manchester rather than having to uproot his young family.

== Career statistics ==
As of match played 28 October 2017

Appearances and goals by club, season and competition
Club	Season	League			National Cup		League Cup		Other		Total	
Club	Season	Division	Apps	Goals	Apps	Goals	Apps	Goals	Apps	Goals	Apps	Goals
Manchester City	2006–07	Premier League	0	0	0	0	0	0	—		0	0
Manchester City	2007–08	Premier League	0	0	0	0	0	0	—		0	0
Manchester City	Total		0	0	0	0	0	0	—		0	0
Swindon Town (loan)	2006–07	League Two	4	0	—		—		—		4	0
Millwall	2008–09	League One	17	2	3	2	0	0	1 (Note: Appearances in Football League Trophy)	0	21	4
Millwall	2009–10	League One	4	0	2	0	2	0	1	0	9	0
Millwall	2010–11	Championship	0	0	—		0	0	—		0	0
Millwall	Total		21	2	5	2	2	0	2	0	30	4
Lincoln City (loan)	2010–11	League Two	27	15	3	2	—		0	0	30	17
Rochdale	2011–12	League One	36	8	1	0	3	3	2	0	42	11
Rochdale	2012–13	League Two	38	10	1	0	1	0	1	1	41	11
Rochdale	Total		74	18	2	0	4	3	3	1	83	22
Bury	2013–14	League Two	15	0	0	0	2	0	1	0	18	0
Walsall	2014–15	League One	27	2	2	0	2	0	5	0	36	2
Barrow	2015–16	National League	17	1	1	0	—		1 (Note: Appearance in the FA Trophy)	0	19	1
Southport	2016–17	National League	18	1	1	1	—		0	0	19	2
Edinburgh City	2017–18	Scottish League Two	10	1	1	0	4	3	1 (Note: Appearance in Scottish Challenge Cup)	0	16	4
Career totals			168	37	12	4	10	3	11	1	201	45

== Honours ==
Walsall

- Football League Trophy runner-up: 2014–15
