= Sam Minihan =

English footballer (born 1994)

Personal information
- Full name: Samuel Joseph Minihan
- Date of birth: 16 February 1994 (age 32)
- Place of birth: Rochdale, England
- Height: 5 ft 10 in (1.78 m)
- Position: Defender

Team information
- Current team: Southport
- Number: 22

Youth career
- 2001–2012: Rochdale
- 2013–2015: Loughborough University

Senior career*
Years	Team	Apps	(Gls)
2012–2013	Rochdale	1	(0)
2012–2013	→ Droylsden (loan)	14	(0)
2015–2016	Worcester City	34	(1)
2016–2022	Stockport County	208	(6)
2022–2023	FC Halifax Town	11	(0)
2023–2024	Buxton	37	(2)
2024–	Southport	100	(0)
- * Club domestic league appearances and goals as of 21:54, 20 May 2024 (UTC)

Samuel Joseph Minihan (born 16 February 1994) is an English professional footballer who plays for National League North club Southport.

== Early and personal life ==
Minihan was born in Rochdale, Greater Manchester, and attended Bacup and Rawtenstall Grammar School. Minihan grew up in Bamford with his mum, dad and sister.

== Career ==
=== Rochdale ===
He started his career with his local side Rochdale and signed a two-year scholarship terms in the summer of 2010. He made his professional debut for Dale on 14 April 2012, in the Football League One 3–2 victory over Exeter City. On 1 May 2012, Sam signed a two-year professional deal with the club, along with fellow youngster Luke Watson. In October 2012, he joined Conference North side Droylsden on a one-month loan deal.

In May 2013, Minihan was released from his contract and left Rochdale.

=== Loughborough University ===
From 2013 to 2015, Minihan played for Loughborough University F.C. of the Midland Football League. In 2014, he took part in a high-profile friendly against a Manchester United Youth XI. He captained a Loughborough side that went on to lose 2–0.

=== Worcester City ===
Minihan joined Worcester City of the National League North in 2015. In his first season at the club, he made thirty-four appearances for the first team, scoring one goal, and was awarded Young Player of the Season, and Player's Player of the Season.

=== Stockport County ===
On 16 June 2016, Minihan rejected an option for an extra year with Worcester and signed for Stockport County, also of the National League North, on a free transfer ten days later. The player desired to be closer to his family in the North West. After picking up the club's 2016/17 Young Player of the Year award in his first season, Minihan was rewarded with an improved two-year deal.

=== FC Halifax Town ===
On 28 July 2022, Minihan returned to the National League to join FC Halifax Town. Minihan left Halifax in May 2023.

=== Buxton ===
On 3 August 2023 it was announced that Minihan had joined National League North club Buxton. Minihan left at the end of the season.

=== Southport ===
On 3 June 2024 it was announced that Minihan had joined Southport.

== Career statistics ==
As of end of 2023–24 season

Appearances and goals by club, season and competition
Club	Season	League			FA Cup		League Cup		Other		Total	
Club	Season	Division	Apps	Goals	Apps	Goals	Apps	Goals	Apps	Goals	Apps	Goals
Rochdale	2011–12	League One	1	0	0	0	0	0	0	0	1	0
Droylsden (loan)	2012–13	Conference North	14	0	0	0	—		0	0	14	0
Loughborough University	2013–14	Midland Football Alliance					—					
Loughborough University	2014–15	MFL - Premier Division					—					
Worcester City	2015–16	National League North	34	1	2	0	—		2 (Note: Appearances in the FA Trophy)	0	38	1
Stockport County	2016–17	National League North	37	2	2	0	—		3	0	42	2
Stockport County	2017–18	National League North	16	2	0	0	—		0	0	16	2
Stockport County	2018–19	National League North	35	1	5	0	—		6	0	46	1
Stockport County	2019–20	National League	35	1	1	0	—		3	1	39	2
Stockport County	2020–21	National League	39	0	2	0	—		2	0	43	0
Stockport County	2021–22	National League	12	0	2	0	—		4	0	18	0
Stockport County	Total		174	6	12	0	0	0	18	1	204	7
FC Halifax Town	2022–23	National League	11	0	0	0	—		0	0	11	0
Buxton	2023–24	National League North	37	2	0	0	—		0	0	37	2
Career total			271	9	14	0	0	0	20	1	305	10

== Honours ==
Stockport County

- National League: 2021–22
