= Godwin Abadaki =

Nigerian footballer

Personal information
- Full name: Godwin Olorunfemi Ebenmosi Abadaki
- Date of birth: 12 October 1993 (age 33)
- Place of birth: Kwara, Nigeria
- Height: 5 ft 11 in (1.80 m)
- Position: Forward

Youth career
- Rochdale

Senior career*
Years	Team	Apps	(Gls)
2011–2014	Rochdale	2	(0)
2012	→ Hyde (loan)	10	(2)
2012	→ Huddersfield Town (loan)	0	(0)
2013	→ Southport (loan)		
2014	→ Stalybridge Celtic (loan)	2	(0)
2014	→ Workington (loan)		
2014–2015	Northwich Victoria	9	(3)
2015	Ashton United		
2015–2016	Mossley	27	(1)
2016	Nantwich Town		
2016–2017	Northwich Victoria		
2017–2018	Shaw Lane	29	(4)
2018–2020	Mossley	10	(1)
2020–2021	Buxton		
2021–2022	Ramsbottom United	11	(25)
2022–2023	Stalybridge Celtic	26	(1)
2023–2024	Runcorn Linnets		
2023–2024	→ Lower Breck (loan)		
- * Club domestic league appearances and goals as of 19:00, 24 May 2026 (UTC)

Godwin Olorunfemi Ebenmosi Abadaki (born 12 October 1993) is a footballer who plays as a forward. He played in the Football League for Rochdale and was also loaned to Hyde during the 2011–12 season as they were crowned Conference North Champions.

== Career ==
=== Rochdale ===
Abadaki came through Rochdale's youth system. He made his Football League debut against Tranmere Rovers on 17 January 2012 as a late substitute. He also came on as a substitute in Rochdale's following game against Wycombe.

==== Loans ====
He signed for Football League Championship side Huddersfield Town on 19 September 2012 on a youth loan until January 2013. As part of the deal Abadaki worked with Senior Professional Development Coach Steve Eyre and the Under-21 Development Squad during his stay at the club, with the option of a permanent deal at the conclusion of the youth loan.

Abadaki joined Hyde United on a month's loan with fellow Rochdale striker Reece Gray in February 2012. His loan was extended and at the end of his time with the club he had scored two goals in ten league appearances.

Further loan periods followed with Southport in 2013, and Stalybridge Celtic in early 2014. On 24 March 2014, Abadaki joined Workington on loan.

=== Northwich Victoria ===
In summer of 2014 he joined Northwich Victoria. He made his competitive debut for the club in a draw against Kendal Town on 16 August. His first competitive goal for the club came on 25 August, as they beat Warrington Town 2–0. He then hit his first hat-tick for the club as they beat AFC Emley 4–0 in an FA Cup preliminary round match. He continued his goal-scoring record as he then scored twice for the club on 9 September as they beat Burscough 5–0.

=== Ashton United ===
His next move was to Ashton United.

=== Mossley ===
He then joined Mossley.

=== Nantwich Town ===
After spending some time on trial with Stockport County and then with Nantwich Town, in August 2016 he joined Nantwich Town.

=== Shaw Lane ===
In March 2017 he joined Shaw Lane.

=== Second time at Mossley ===
He then re-joined Mossley.

=== Buxton ===
In July 2020 he joined Buxton.

=== Ramsbottom United ===
In August 2021 he signed for Ramsbottom United.

=== Stalybridge Celtic ===
In June 2022, Abadaki returned to Stalybridge Celtic having previously spent time with the club on loan.

=== Runcorn Linnets ===
In July 2023, Abadaki signed for Runcorn Linnets. He went on loan to Lower Breck, then he was released from Runcorn Linnets at the end of his contract in May 2024.

=== Lower Breck ===
In September 2025, Abadaki joined Lower Breck on loan.

== Personal life ==
His older brother, Osebi (born 1991), is also a footballer who started his career at Blackburn Rovers' academy before playing extensively in English non-league football in the north of England. In 2017, both brothers played at the same time for the same club, Shaw Lane and in 2020 were both at Buxton at the same time.
