= Fred Eyre =

English footballer and manager (born 1944)

Personal information
- Full name: Stanley Frederick Eyre
- Date of birth: 3 February 1944 (age 82)
- Place of birth: Manchester, England
- Position: Wing half

Youth career
- 1959–1961: Manchester City

Senior career*
Years	Team	Apps	(Gls)
1961–1963	Manchester City	0	(0)
1963–1964	Lincoln City	0	(0)
1964–1965	Crewe Alexandra	0	(0)
- Oswestry Town
- Rossendale United
- New Brighton
- Ellesmere Port
- Radcliffe Borough
- Chadderton
1969–1970	Bradford Park Avenue	1	(0)
- Oswestry Town
- Wigan Athletic

Managerial career
- 1981: Wigan Athletic (caretaker)
- 1998: Sheffield United (assistant)
- * Club domestic league appearances and goals

Stanley Frederick Eyre (born 3 February 1944) is an English former professional football player and coach. After retiring from the sport, Eyre became a successful businessman, author, after-dinner speaker and radio pundit. He is the father of former Rochdale manager Steve Eyre.

== Career ==
=== Playing career ===
Born in Manchester, Eyre played as a wing half and began his early career as an apprentice at Football League club Manchester City, where he cleaned boots for players including Bert Trautmann and Denis Law, his playing heroes. Eyre was Manchester City's first ever apprentice. Failing to make the grade at Manchester City, he signed with Lincoln City in 1963 and then had a trial with Huddersfield Town before signing for Crewe Alexandra at the start of the 1964–65 season, but he never made a first-team appearance for either team. After leaving Crewe Alexandra in 1965, Eyre played in the English non-League system with a total of twenty clubs, including Oswestry Town, Rossendale United, New Brighton, Ellesmere Port, Radcliffe Borough and Chadderton. Eyre returned to League football briefly during the 1969–70 season with Bradford Park Avenue, making one appearance, before returning to Oswestry Town; he later played for Wigan Athletic.

== Coaching career ==
Eyre worked on the coaching staff of both Bradford Park Avenue and Southport, and had a brief spell as caretaker manager of Wigan Athletic in 1981, winning one game and drawing a second. He was also Assistant Manager of Sheffield United in 1998, as well as being Chief Scout at the same club.

== After football ==
Eyre started his own office supply company, became an after-dinner speaker, and published a book called Kicked into Touch, which had sold over a million copies as of April 2005. One story that Eyre told involved Hungarian player Ferenc Puskás; on holiday in Australia, Eyre found himself on the same pitch as Puskás, who was coaching South Melbourne at the time:

Then came a masterstroke, a touch of genius, a lifetime spent playing, studying and reading about the game all came together in the next glorious second. Ocsi! I shouted, the nickname meaning 'Little Brother' he'd been given as a child in Hungary. He spun round with a look of astonishment as I fired a peach of a pass which he sizzled into the roof of the net with that trusty old left foot. Scorer Ferenc Puskas, assist Fred Eyre, the stuff of dreams. We walked off the pitch arm in arm.

— Fred Eyre

As of 2009, Eyre co-commentated on Manchester City matches for BBC Radio Manchester. He was still in the role as of 2011, when he suffered from a 'mystery illness'.

== Books ==
After retiring as a player he became a writer, publishing books including:

Kicked Into Touch
Another Breath Of Fred Eyre
What A Game! (with Roy Cavanagh)
Star Games
Taking The Mike
