= D'Arcy O'Connor =

English footballer (born 1994)

Personal information
- Full name: D'Arcy Christopher O'Connor
- Date of birth: 21 December 1994 (age 31)
- Place of birth: Oldham, England
- Position: Midfielder

Senior career*
Years	Team	Apps	(Gls)
2013–2014	Rochdale	1	(0)
2013–2014	→ Hyde (loan)	5	(0)
2014	→ Workington (loan)	16	(0)
2014–2015	Hyde	17	(1)
2015-2015	Ashton United	4	(0)
2015–2016	Bacup Borough	53	(11)
2016–2017	New Mills	17	(1)
2018	Bacup Borough	27	(5)
2019–2021	Winsford United	67	(14)
2022–2023	Prestwich Heys	29	(1)
- * Club domestic league appearances and goals as of 09:52, 5 January 2021 (UTC)

D'Arcy Christopher O'Connor (born 21 December 1994) is an English footballer.

== Career ==
Born in Oldham, O'Connor began his career with Rochdale and made his professional debut on 27 April 2013 in a 1–0 victory against Plymouth Argyle.

On 22 November 2013, he joined Conference Premier side Hyde on a one-month loan deal. He made his Hyde debut on 23 November, in a 2–1 defeat to Alfreton Town. He scored the first own goal of his career in a 3–0 defeat to Macclesfield Town on 1 January 2014. His loan at Hyde was extended for a further month on 3 January 2014. On 24 March 2014, O'Connor joined Workington on loan for the remainder of the season.

After his release from Rochdale in July 2014, he signed for his former club Hyde in the Conference North. He left the club in January 2015. He then joined Ashton United.

== Career statistics ==
As of 1 May 2023.

Appearances and goals by club, season and competition
Club	Season	League^{[A]}		FA Cup		League Cup		Other^{[B]}		Total	
Club	Season	Apps	Goals	Apps	Goals	Apps	Goals	Apps	Goals	Apps	Goals
Rochdale	2012–13	1	0	0	0	0	0	0	0	1	0
Rochdale	2013–14	0	0	0	0	0	0	0	0	0	0
Rochdale	Total	1	0	0	0	0	0	0	0	1	0
Hyde (loan)	2013–14	5	0	0	0	0	0	1	0	6	0
Bacup	2017–19	80	1	0	0	0	0	0	0	80	0
Career totals		86	1	0	0	0	0	1	0	87	0

== Footnotes ==
A. The "League" column constitutes appearances and goals (including those as a substitute) in the Football League and Football Conference.
B. The "Other" column constitutes appearances and goals (including those as a substitute) in the Football League Trophy and FA Trophy.
