= Matty Edwards =

English-born Scottish footballer (born 1991)

Personal information
- Full name: Matthew Philip Edwards
- Date of birth: 1 August 1991 (age 35)
- Place of birth: Birkenhead, England
- Height: 6 ft 1 in (1.85 m)
- Position: Goalkeeper

Youth career
- –2009: Leeds United

Senior career*
Years	Team	Apps	(Gls)
2008–2009	Leeds United	0	(0)
2009	→ Salford City (loan)	?	(?)
2009–2013	Rochdale	8	(0)

International career^{‡}
2012	Scotland U21	1	(0)
- * Club domestic league appearances and goals as of 02:49, 8 February 2015 (UTC) ‡ National team caps and goals as of 02:49, 8 February 2015 (UTC)

Matthew Philip Edwards (born 1 August 1991) is an English-born Scottish footballer, who is unattached. He has played for Leeds United and Rochdale as a goalkeeper.

== Career ==
=== Leeds United ===
Born in Liverpool, England, Edwards started his career at Manchester United but never received a professional contract. He then continued his career playing in the youth teams at Leeds United. He signed his first professional contract for Leeds in 2008 aged 17. In January 2009 he joined Salford City on a month's loan deal, before he was released by Leeds in summer that year.

=== Rochdale ===
After his release by Leeds, he joined up with Keith Hill at Rochdale as cover for Kenny Arthur. He made his Rochdale debut on 27 November 2010 in a 1–1 draw at home to Oldham Athletic, coming on as a substitute for injured Josh Lillis. In December 2010 he signed a contract extension with Rochdale. In May 2011, Matty put pen-to-paper on yet another six-month deal at Spotland, which was later extended to the end of last season.

Edwards made seven appearances for the first team in the 2011–12 season, before signing yet another short-term contract with the club.

After the end of the 2012–13 season his contract was not renewed by Keith Hill.

== International career ==
Edwards was selected for the Scotland national under-21 football team in April 2012 and he appeared as a substitute in the second half in a 4–1 defeat against Italy. He is eligible to represent Scotland because his maternal grandmother was born in Airdrie.
