= Reece Gray =

English footballer (born 1992)

- Gray with the Conference North trophy in 2012

Personal information
- Full name: Reece Anthony Gray
- Date of birth: 1 September 1992 (age 34)
- Place of birth: Oldham, England
- Height: 5 ft 10 in (1.78 m)
- Position: Forward

Senior career*
| Years | Team | Apps | (Gls) |
| 2010–2014 | Rochdale | 13 | (2) |
| 2011–2012 | → Hyde (loan) | 17 | (4) |
| 2013 | → Hyde (loan) | 9 | (1) |
| 2013–2014 | → FC Halifax Town (loan) | 7 | (1) |
| 2014–2016 | Hyde United | 14 | (1) |
| 2016 | Ashton United | | |
| 2016–? | Northwich Victoria | | |
- * Club domestic league appearances and goals as of 17:23, 8 May 2014 (UTC)

Reece Anthony Gray (born 1 September 1992) is an English footballer who plays as a forward. He played for Rochdale in the Football League. In a loan spell with Hyde in the 2011–12 season he won a Conference North winners medal.

== Career ==
=== Rochdale ===
Born in Oldham, Greater Manchester, Gray made his debut for Rochdale on 1 May 2010 in the Football League Two defeat against Burton Albion at Spotland Stadium. He played his second game a week later, coming off the bench in a 1–0 away defeat to Barnet. He scored his first goal for the club almost a year later, on 7 May 2011, scoring the winner as his side beat AFC Bournemouth.

On 16 December 2011, he joined Conference North side Hyde on a one-month loan deal. He made his debut for the club on 17 December, in a 4–2 win over Vauxhall Motors. He was set to miss his second game for Hyde on 26 December, due to a suspension that had to be served from his sending off for Rochdale's reserve team, but after Hyde had been in negotiations with the Football Association, it was over-turned in time for him to play in Hyde's derby fixture with Stalybridge Celtic on Boxing Day. Gray would serve the suspension upon his return to Rochdale. On 1 January 2012, in the return fixture at Stalybridge, he scored his first goal for the club, scoring the opener as Hyde came out as 3–1 winners. He played five games scoring the one goal in his time with Hyde, before returning to Rochdale on 16 January 2012, after his month's loan deal had expired.

After returning to Rochdale, Gray made two appearances towards the back end of the 2011–12 season. His first coming in a 2–1 defeat to Milton Keynes Dons on 28 April 2012. He scored his first Rochdale goal of the season in a 2–1 defeat to Leyton Orient on 5 May. He was given the number 10 shirt by Rochdale during pre-season building up to the 2012–13 season, but in August 2012 he suffered a dislocated ankle, a fractured tibula and a snapped medial ligament in behind-closed-doors fixture with Liverpool, forcing the game to be abandoned and ruling Gray out for about 6 months. He made his comeback from the injury on 20 April 2013, in a 3–0 defeat to Oxford United.

On 3 October 2013, he re-joined Hyde on a one-month loan deal. He made his second debut for the club two days later starting in a 3–0 defeat to Braintree Town at Ewen Fields. He scored his first and only goal on the loan spell on 16 November, scoring in a 3–2 defeat away to Woking. On 28 November 2013, Gray signed for Conference Premier side FC Halifax Town on a loan deal until January 2014. He made his debut for the club on 7 December, receiving a red card in a 4–3 defeat to Woking at The Shay. He scored his first goal for Halifax on 28 December in a 5–1 win over Lincoln City.

On 7 May 2014, Gray was released by Rochdale after their promotion to League One.

=== Hyde ===
On 29 August 2014, he signed for Conference North side Hyde United on a permanent deal. He made his debut coming on as a substitute in a 2–2 draw with Tamworth.

=== Ashton United ===
In March 2016 he joined Ashton United

=== Northwich Victoria ===
He then joined Northwich Victoria.

== Career statistics ==
As of 4 May 2012

Appearances and goals by club, season and competition
| Club | Season | League | | | FA Cup | | League Cup | | Other (Note: Includes FA Trophy and Football League Trophy.) | | Total | |
| Club | Season | Division | Apps | Goals | Apps | Goals | Apps | Goals | Apps | Goals | Apps | Goals |
|---|---|---|---|---|---|---|---|---|---|---|---|---|
| Rochdale | 2009–10 | League Two | 2 | 0 | 0 | 0 | 0 | 0 | 0 | 0 | 2 | 0 |
| Rochdale | 2010–11 | League One | 2 | 1 | 0 | 0 | 0 | 0 | 0 | 0 | 2 | 1 |
| Rochdale | 2011–12 | League One | 4 | 1 | 0 | 0 | 0 | 0 | 0 | 0 | 4 | 1 |
| Rochdale | Total | | 8 | 2 | 0 | 0 | 0 | 0 | 0 | 0 | 8 | 2 |
| Hyde United (loan) | 2011–12 | Conference North | 17 | 4 | 0 | 0 | — | | 0 | 0 | 17 | 4 |
| Career total | | | 25 | 6 | 0 | 0 | 0 | 0 | 0 | 0 | 25 | 6 |
