= Steve Eyre =

English football manager (born 1972)

Personal information
- Full name: Steven Frederick Eyre
- Date of birth: 9 May 1972 (age 54)
- Place of birth: Salford, England

Youth career
- 1988–1990: Burnley

Senior career*
Years	Team	Apps	(Gls)
1990–1991	Wigan Athletic	0	(0)
1998–1999	Radcliffe Borough	35	(5)

Managerial career
- 2011: Rochdale
- 2013: Huddersfield Town (caretaker)
- * Club domestic league appearances and goals

Steven Frederick Eyre (born 9 May 1972) is an English former football manager. He was a youth player with Burnley between 1988 and 1990, before joining Wigan Athletic in 1990. He did not make any league appearances for the club prior to retiring at the age of 19.

== Playing career ==
Eyre played for several non-League clubs in the northwest of England, including Barrow, Chorley and Radcliffe Borough.

== Managerial career ==
After quitting playing full time aged 19 to take up coaching, Eyre moved up the ranks to coach Manchester City's youth team, with whom he won five youth league titles and led the club to two FA Youth Cup final appearances, winning in 2008. He spent 21 years with Manchester City.

On 13 June 2011, Eyre was appointed Rochdale manager, after Keith Hill joined Barnsley. Six months later, with the club in 22nd place in League One, Rochdale terminated the contracts of Eyre and his assistant Frankie Bunn.

On 12 April 2012, Eyre was appointed the role of Senior Professional Development Coach at League One club Huddersfield Town, taking a leading role in the club's Development Squad. Following Simon Grayson's sacking on 24 January 2013, he and Mark Lillis became joint caretaker managers until a successor was chosen.

In March 2022, he joined League One side Doncaster Rovers as part of Gary McSheffrey backroom staff, replacing Glyn Hodges, who had joined Bradford City weeks earlier. On 17 October 2022, Eyre and McSheffrey, were sacked by Doncaster.

In March 2025, Eyre was appointed interim assistant manager of Northern Premier League Premier Division club Matlock Town, assisting Adam Clayton. Despite having been unable to save the club from relegation, the duo were appointed permanently on 28 April. Eyre departed alongside Clayton on 27 December 2025.

== Media work ==
In late 2020, he started to summarise Bolton Wanderers matches for local radio. He also summarises for BBC Radio Lancashire.

== Personal life ==
Born in Salford, Greater Manchester, he is the son of former footballer and radio pundit Fred Eyre.

Eyre is married to Claire, with whom he has three daughters.

== Honours ==
=== Coach ===
Manchester City

- FA Youth Cup 2007–08
