= 2013–14 Norwich City F.C. season =

Norwich City
2013–14 season
- Chairman: Alan Bowkett
- Manager: Chris Hughton (until 6 April 2014); Neil Adams (from 6 April 2014)
- Stadium: Carrow Road
- Premier League: 18th (relegated)
- FA Cup: Third round
- League Cup: Fourth round
- Top goalscorer: League: Gary Hooper/ Robert Snodgrass (6); All: Gary Hooper (8)
- Highest home attendance: 26,876 (15 December vs Swansea)
- Lowest home attendance: 16,107 (27 August vs Bury)
- Average home league attendance: 26,805
Home colours	Away colours

The 2013–14 season was the 112th season of football for Norwich City. It was Norwich City's third campaign in the Premier League since achieving promotion during the 2010–11 season and was their 24th season in the top flight of English football. Norwich spent most of the season in the bottom half of the Premier League table, but only in two short periods, in September and October, were they actually in the relegation zone and this is where they slipped back to in the final few matches of the season. They finished the season in eighteenth place in the Premier League and were subsequently relegated to the Championship. Norwich lost in a replay to Fulham in the third round of the FA Cup and to Manchester United in the fourth round of the League Cup. It was a season that saw the sacking of manager Chris Hughton and the appointment of former Norwich player Neil Adams as his replacement with five games left to play.

== Build up to the season ==
Expectations were high for Norwich after they finished the previous season in 11th position in the league, their highest league finish since 1992–93. The £13.5 million profit made during the 2011–12 season, and the prospect of becoming debt free, also raised the expectations of the fans with the prospect of significant spending on players over the summer 2013 transfer window.

=== Players and club staff ===
Squad

No.	Player	Pos	Date of birth (age)	Signed from	Signed in	Apps	Goals
1	John Ruddy	GK	1986-10-24 (age 27)	Everton	2010	98	0
2	Russell Martin (club captain)	RB	1986-01-04 (age 28)	Peterborough United	2010 (Note: joined on loan Nov 2009, permanently signed Jan 2010)	147	10
3	Steven Whittaker	RB	1984-06-16 (age 30)	Rangers	2012	14	1
4	Bradley Johnson	CM	1987-04-28 (age 27)	Leeds United	2011	68	3
5	Sébastien Bassong (captain)	CB	1986-07-09 (age 27)	Tottenham Hotspur	2012	35	3
6	Michael Turner	CB	1983-11-09 (age 30)	Sunderland	2012	28	3
7	Robert Snodgrass	RW	1987-09-07 (age 26)	Leeds United	2012	40	7
8	Jonny Howson	CM	1988-05-21 (age 26)	Leeds United	2012	44	3
9	Ricky van Wolfswinkel	FW	1989-01-27 (age 25)	Sporting CP	2013	–	–
10	Leroy Fer	CM	1990-01-05 (age 24)	Twente	2013	–	–
11	Gary Hooper	FW	1988-02-26 (age 26)	Celtic	2013	–	–
12	Anthony Pilkington	LW	1988-06-06 (age 26)	Huddersfield Town	2011	65	13
13	Mark Bunn	GK	1984-11-16 (age 29)	Blackburn Rovers	2012	26	0
14	Wes Hoolahan	CAM	1982-05-20 (age 32)	Blackpool	2008	194	35
15	Jonás Gutiérrez	RW	1983-07-05 (age 30)	Newcastle United (loan)	2014	–	–
16	Johan Elmander	FW	1981–05–27 (age 33)	Galatasaray (loan)	2013	–	–
17	Elliott Bennett	RW	1988-12-18 (age 25)	Brighton & Hove Albion	2011	64	3
18	Javier Garrido	LB	1985-03-15 (age 29)	Lazio	2013 (Note: joined on loan Aug 2012, permanently signed May 2013)	35	0
19	Luciano Becchio	FW	1983-12-28 (age 30)	Leeds United	2013	8	0
20	Carlo Nash	GK	1973-09-13 (age 40)	Stoke City	2013	–	–
22	Nathan Redmond	LW	1994-03-06 (age 20)	Birmingham City	2013	–	–
23	Martin Olsson	LB	1988-05-17 (age 26)	Blackburn Rovers	2013	–	–
24	Ryan Bennett	CB	1990-03-06 (age 24)	Peterborough United	2012	28	1
25	David Fox	CM	1983-12-13 (age 30)	Colchester United	2010	74	1
26	Joseph Yobo	CB	1980–09–06 (age 33)	Fenerbahçe (loan)	2014	–	–
27	Alexander Tettey	CDM	1986-04-04 (age 28)	Rennes	2012	29	1
31	Josh Murphy	LW	1995–02–24 (age 19)	Academy (2006)	2013	0	0

Club staff

Backroom Staff

Chris Hughton (manager until 6 April 2014)
Neil Adams (manager from 6 April 2014)
Colin Calderwood (assistant manager until 6 April 2014)
Paul Trollope (first-team coach until 6 April 2014)
Dave Watson (goalkeeping coach)
Ewan Chester (director of football recruitment)
Neal Reynolds (head of physiotherapy)
Dr. Nick Wiford (team doctor)

Board of directors

Delia Smith (joint majority shareholder)
Michael Wynn-Jones (joint majority shareholder)
Alan Bowkett (chairman)
Michael Foulger (deputy chairman)
David McNally (chief executive)
Stephan Phillips (director)
Stephen Fry (director)

Apps/goals stats correct up to and including the 2012–13 season

=== Summer transfer window ===
==== Transfers out ====
Following their 11th-place finish in the 2012–13 Premier League Norwich started their preparations for their third consecutive season in the top flight by releasing ten players in May 2013 including first team players Chris Martin, Simeon Jackson, Elliot Ward and Marc Tierney. Over the course of the summer James Vaughan, Grant Holt, Leon Barnett and Jacob Butterfield were all sold for undisclosed fees. Former Norwich City manager Paul Lambert returned to his former club to sign goalkeeper Jed Steer for his current club Aston Villa but the decision on a fee went to tribunal. During the summer Declan Rudd and Andrew Surman were both loaned out to lower league clubs for the season. During the lower league loan window David Fox and Daniel Ayala were loaned for half of the season.

Grant Holt's exit followed a very successful period at the club including two promotions, being named Norwich City F.C. Player of the Season three times and being top scorer at the club four seasons in a row. Holt blamed the tactics of Chris Hughton as a contributory factor in his exit, along with the prospect of playing Europa League football for the first time.

Date	Player	Pos	Moving to	Fee	Apps	Goals
20 May 2013^{†}	Simeon Jackson	FW	Eintracht Braunschweig	released	86	21
20 May 2013^{†}	Korey Smith	CM	Oldham Athletic	released	73	4
20 May 2013^{†}	Marc Tierney	LB	Bolton Wanderers	released	39	0
20 May 2013^{†}	Elliott Ward	CB	Bournemouth	released	55	1
20 May 2013^{†}	Chris Martin	FW	Derby County	released	117	34
20 May 2013^{†}	Tom Adeyemi	CM	Birmingham City	released	17	1
20 May 2013^{†}	George Francomb	RB	AFC Wimbledon	released	5	0
20 May 2013^{†}	Lee Camp	GK	West Bromwich Albion	released	6	0
20 May 2013^{†}	Ramil Sheriff	CB	unattached	released	–	–
20 May 2013^{†}	Olumide Durojaiye	CM	Falkirk	released	–	–
26 Jun 2013^{†}	Jed Steer	GK	Aston Villa	£450,000	2	0
3 Jul 2013	James Vaughan	FW	Huddersfield Town	undisclosed	6	0
8 Jul 2013	Grant Holt	FW	Wigan Athletic	undisclosed	168	78
1 Aug 2013	Leon Barnett	CB	Wigan Athletic	undisclosed	55	2
2 Sep 2013	Jacob Butterfield	CM	Middlesbrough	undisclosed	3	0

Date	Player	Pos	Loaned to	Expires	Notes
18 Jun 2013^{†}	Declan Rudd	GK	Preston North End	Jun 2014	season-long
31 Jul 2013	Andrew Surman	CM	Bournemouth	Jun 2014	season-long
27 Sep 2013	David Fox	CM	Barnsley	27 Dec 2013	three-month
23 Oct 2013	Daniel Ayala	CB	Middlesbrough	23 Jan 2014	three-month

==== Transfers in ====
The summer transfer window was a record breaking one for Norwich with both a record amount spent in total and a record amount spent on a single player. The task of building on the successes of the previous season for the 2013–14 season started while the 2012–13 season was still in progress when during March 2013 it was announced that Ricky van Wolfswinkel had signed for a reported club record fee of £8.5 million. Javier Garrido who had been with Norwich the previous season signed a two-year permanent deal during May 2013. During the summer Gary Hooper, Leroy Fer, Carlo Nash, Martin Olsson and Nathan Redmond all also signed permanent deals. Norwich first attempted to sign Hooper during the January 2013 transfer window with a number of bids reported to have been rejected but he eventually signed during July 2013 for £5 million. In August 2013 Johan Elmander signed on a season long loan deal.

Date	Player	Pos	Moving from	Transfer fee	Contract
23 Mar 2013^{†}	Ricky van Wolfswinkel	FW	Sporting CP	£8.5 million	4-year
14 May 2013^{†}	Javier Garrido	LB	Lazio	undisclosed	2-year
4 Jul 2013	Nathan Redmond	LW	Birmingham City	undisclosed	4-year
10 Jul 2013	Martin Olsson	LB	Blackburn Rovers	undisclosed	4-year
10 Jul 2013	Carlo Nash	GK	Stoke City	free	1-year
13 Jul 2013	Leroy Fer	CM	FC Twente	undisclosed	4-year
26 Jul 2013	Gary Hooper	FW	Celtic	undisclosed	3-year

Date	Player	Pos	Loaned from	Expires	Notes
21 Aug 2013	Johan Elmander	FW	Galatasaray	Jun 2014	season-long

^{†} effective July 2013

=== January transfer window ===
==== Transfers in ====
On 13 January Jonás Gutiérrez signed on loan from Newcastle United. On 30 January Joseph Yobo signed from Fenerbahçe on loan.

Date	Player	Pos	Loaned from	Expires	Notes
13 Jan 2014	Jonás Gutiérrez	RW	Newcastle United	Jun 2014	six-month
30 Jan 2014	Joseph Yobo	CB	Fenerbahçe	Jun 2014	six-month

==== Transfers out ====
After his original three-month loan deal at Middlesbrough expired Daniel Ayala made his move permanent on 24 January for an undisclosed fee. On 7 February it was announced Jacob Murphy would be joining Swindon Town for a month when the loan window opens (8 February).

Date	Player	Pos	Moving to	Fee	Apps	Goals
24 Jan 2014	Daniel Ayala	CB	Middlesbrough	undisclosed	10	0

Date	Player	Pos	Loaned to	Expires	Notes
8 Feb 2014	Jacob Murphy	RW	Swindon Town	8 Mar 2014	one-month

=== Pre-season matches ===
Norwich started their build up to the season with a pre-season tour of the United States. It continued with away games against Brighton and Braga and concluded with two home games against Panathinaikos and Real Sociedad.

18 July 2013 US Tour	Dorados de Sinaloa	0–3	Norwich City	West Sacramento, United States
19:30 PDT (UTC-07)		Report	Becchio 65'; Pilkington 68'; Josh Murphy 70'	Stadium: Raley Field; Attendance: 14,014

20 July 2013 US Tour	San Jose Earthquakes	1–0	Norwich City	Santa Clara, United States
19:30 PDT (UTC-07)	Cato 7'	Report		Stadium: Buck Shaw Stadium; Attendance: 9,631; Referee: Kevin Stott

24 July 2013 US Tour	Portland Timbers	1–0	Norwich City	Portland, United States
20:00 PDT (UTC-07)	Valencia 53'	Report		Stadium: Jeld-Wen Field; Attendance: 18,553; Referee: Younes Marrakchi

30 July 2013 Friendly	Brighton & Hove Albion	1–1	Norwich City	Brighton, England
19:45 BST (UTC+01)	March 83'	Report	Howson 27'	Stadium: Falmer Stadium; Attendance: 10,622

2 August 2013 Friendly	Braga	2–2	Norwich City	Braga, Portugal
20:30 BST (UTC+01)	Vinícius 54'; Rafa 69'	Report	Hooper 14', 28'	Stadium: AXA Stadium; Attendance: 17,000; Referee: Rui Costa

6 August 2013 Friendly	Norwich City	1–1	Real Sociedad	Norwich, England
19:45 BST (UTC+01)	Van Wolfswinkel 12'	Report	Vela 65'	Stadium: Carrow Road; Attendance: 14,433; Referee: Martin Atkinson

10 August 2013 Friendly	Norwich City	2–0	Panathinaikos	Norwich, England
15:00 BST (UTC+01)	Johnson 4', 59'	Report		Stadium: Carrow Road; Attendance: 14,054

Note: first-team friendlies only

== Premier League season ==
=== August ===
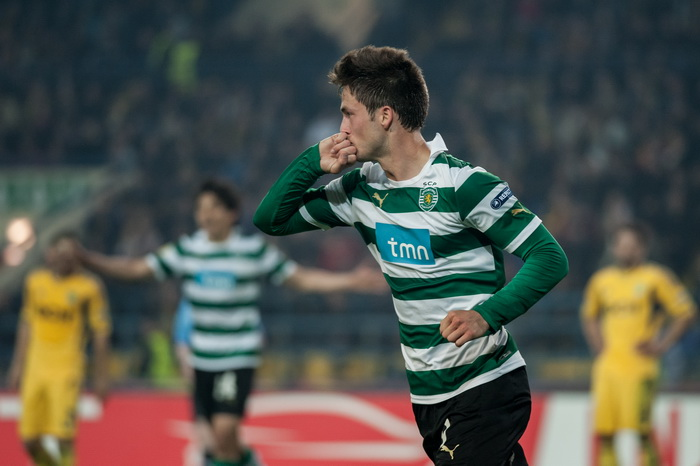
Club record signing Ricky van Wolfswinkel scored his only goal of the season in August

Norwich started their league season with a home draw with Everton with record signing Ricky van Wolfswinkel scoring a 71st-minute equaliser on his debut. This was followed up with a 1–0 away defeat by Hull City. Hull spent an hour with ten men following Yannick Sagbo's red card for an apparent head butt motion towards Russell Martin. Norwich earned their first win of the season with a 1–0 home win over Southampton in which Nathan Redmond scored his first goal for the club.

17 August 2013 1	Norwich City	2–2	Everton	Norwich
15:00 BST (UTC+01)	Whittaker 51'; Van Wolfswinkel 71'	Report	Barkley 63'; Coleman 65'	Stadium: Carrow Road; Attendance: 26,824; Referee: Michael Oliver

24 August 2013 2	Hull City	1–0	Norwich City	Kingston upon Hull
15:00 BST (UTC+01)	Brady 22' (pen.)	Report		Stadium: KC Stadium; Attendance: 23,682; Referee: Mike Jones

31 August 2013 3	Norwich City	1–0	Southampton	Norwich
15:00 BST (UTC+01)	Redmond 68'	Report		Stadium: Carrow Road; Attendance: 26,819; Referee: Howard Webb

=== September ===
Norwich's poor away form continued with a 2–0 away defeat by Tottenham Hotspur. The run of defeats continued when Aston Villa's visit to Carrow Road ended in a 1–0 defeat. Norwich scored their first away goal of the season in their first ever win at the Britannia Stadium when they beat Stoke City 1–0.

14 September 2013 4	Tottenham Hotspur	2–0	Norwich City	London
15:00 BST (UTC+01)	Sigurðsson 28', 50'	Report		Stadium: White Hart Lane; Attendance: 35,952; Referee: Lee Mason

21 September 2013 5	Norwich City	0–1	Aston Villa	Norwich
12:45 BST (UTC+01)		Report	Kozák 30'	Stadium: Carrow Road; Attendance: 26,813; Referee: Chris Foy

29 September 2013 6	Stoke City	0–1	Norwich City	Stoke-on-Trent
13:30 BST (UTC+01)		Report	Howson 34'	Stadium: Britannia Stadium; Attendance: 26,184; Referee: Anthony Taylor

=== October ===
Norwich got back into the game against Chelsea with a goal from Anthony Pilkington but conceded two late goals to finish 1–3 to the visitors. This was followed up with a 4–1 away defeat by Arsenal. The home fixture against Cardiff City finished in controversy when Leroy Fer put the ball in the back of the net when passing the ball back to goalkeeper David Marshall. This resulted in a melee in which both Norwich and Cardiff were fined £20,000 by the FA for failing to control their players. The game was also notable with Norwich having 31 shots at goal despite the game finishing as a draw.

6 October 2013 7	Norwich City	1–3	Chelsea	Norwich
13:30 BST (UTC+01)	Pilkington 68'	Report	Oscar 4'; Hazard 85'; Willian 86'	Stadium: Carrow Road; Attendance: 26,840; Referee: Neil Swarbrick

19 October 2013 8	Arsenal	4–1	Norwich City	London
15:00 BST (UTC+01)	Wilshire 18'; Özil 58', 88'; Ramsey 83'	Report	Howson 70'	Stadium: Emirates Stadium; Attendance: 60,009; Referee: Lee Probert

26 October 2013 9	Norwich City	0–0	Cardiff City	Norwich
15:00 BST (UTC+01)		Report		Stadium: Carrow Road; Attendance: 26,846; Referee: Jones

=== November ===
November started badly with a 7–0 defeat at Manchester City following a 4–0 defeat against Manchester United in the League Cup earlier in the week. This heavy defeat following on from a run of bad form resulted in calls from fans for Chris Hughton to be replaced as manager. Norwich responded to the defeat the following week with a 3–1 comeback win over West Ham United. Gary Hooper's first Premier League goal from the penalty spot marked the start of the comeback and it was completed with goals from Robert Snodgrass and Leroy Fer. Norwich's poor away form continued after the international break with a 2–1 defeat at Newcastle United which stretched their away record to five defeats out of six matches. The run of injuries continued when Anthony Pilkington was stretchered off with a suspected hamstring injury. The 1–0 home win over Crystal Palace was watched by a record all-seater home attendance at Carrow Road in a match which was Tony Pulis' first game in charge of the visitors.

2 November 2013 10	Manchester City	7–0	Norwich City	Manchester
15:00 GMT (UTC)	Johnson 16' (o.g.); Silva 20'; Martin 25' (o.g.); Negredo 36'; Touré 60'; Agüero 71'; Džeko 86'	Report		Stadium: Etihad Stadium; Attendance: 47,066; Referee: Phil Dowd

9 November 2013 11	Norwich City	3–1	West Ham United	Norwich
17:30 GMT (UTC)	Hooper 54' (pen.); Snodgrass 72'; Fer 90+3'	Report	Morrison 32'	Stadium: Carrow Road; Attendance: 26,824; Referee: Jon Moss

23 November 2013 12	Newcastle United	2–1	Norwich City	Newcastle upon Tyne
15:00 GMT (UTC)	Rémy 2'; Gouffran 38'	Report	Fer 80'	Stadium: St James' Park; Attendance: 51,328; Referee: Mike Dean

30 November 2013 13	Norwich City	1–0	Crystal Palace	Norwich
15:00 GMT (UTC)	Hooper 30'	Report		Stadium: Carrow Road; Attendance: 26,851; Referee: Chris Foy

=== December ===
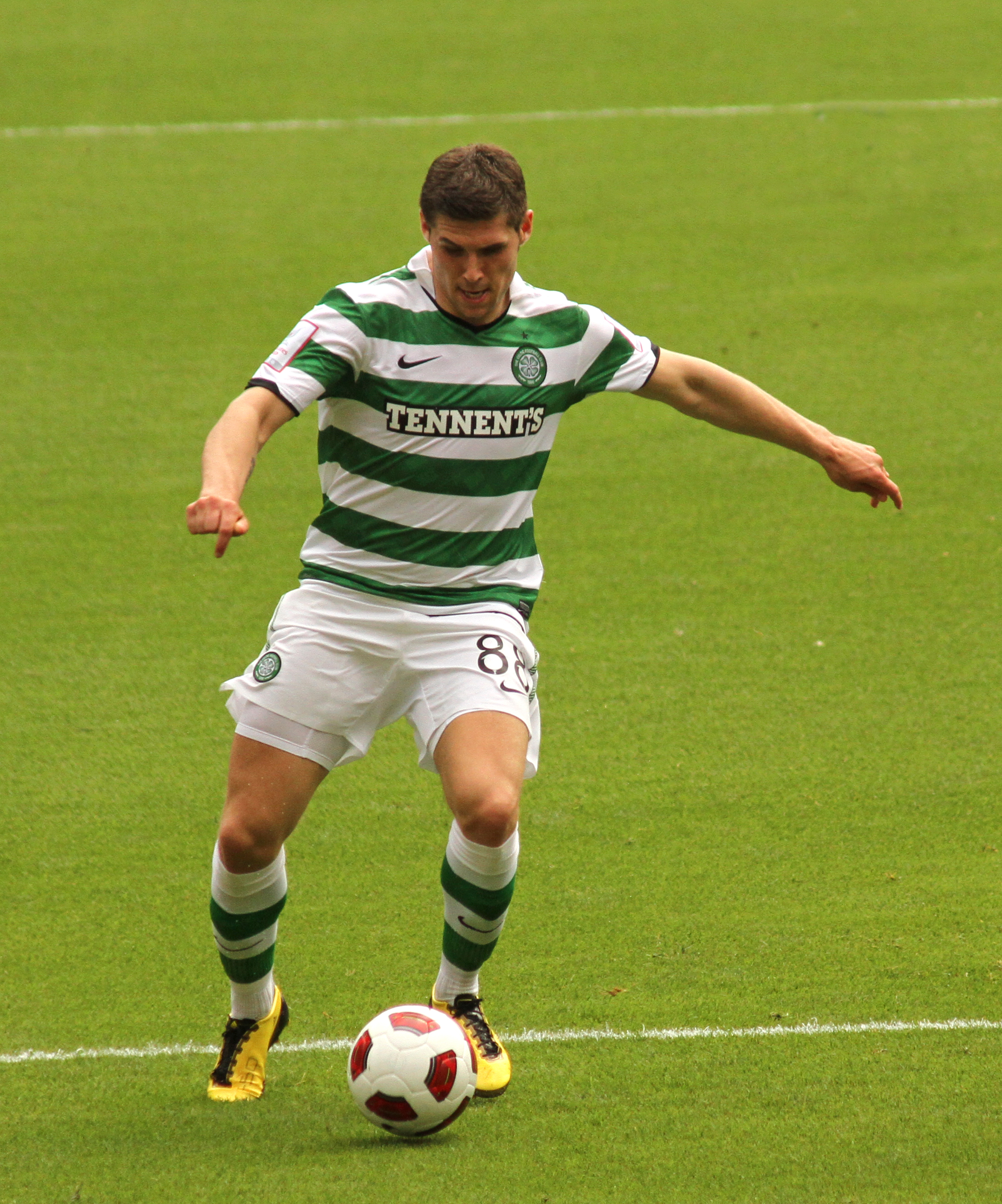
Leading goalscorer for the season Gary Hooper

Norwich's poor away form continued at Anfield with Liverpool winning 5–1. Luis Suarez scored four of the goals which was Suárez's third hat-trick against Norwich in three seasons and extended his run to eleven goals in five games against Norwich. Three days after their mauling at Liverpool, Norwich were again on the road travelling to West Bromwich Albion where goals from Gary Hooper and Leroy Fer saw them climb up to 14th in the table. The return to Carrow Road for the match against Swansea City saw Hooper score his fourth goal in six games to equalise following Nathan Dyer's opener. The final game before Christmas saw Norwich travel to the Stadium of Light where the goalless draw saw reach Norwich 19 points, six points clear of the relegation zone, and ensure that Sunderland went into Christmas three points adrift of the bottom of the table. Hooper scored his fifth goal in eight games in a Boxing Day defeat by Fulham. The year finished poorly with a 0–1 home defeat by defending champions Manchester United seeing the Canaries pick up only two points from a possible twelve.

4 December 2013 14	Liverpool	5–1	Norwich City	Liverpool
19:45 GMT (UTC)	Suárez 15', 29', 35', 74'; Sterling 88'	Report	Johnson 83'	Stadium: Anfield; Attendance: 44,541; Referee: Anthony Taylor

7 December 2013 15	West Bromwich Albion	0–2	Norwich City	West Bromwich
15:00 GMT (UTC)		report	Hooper 13'; Fer 89'	Stadium: The Hawthorns; Attendance: 23,675; Referee: Mark Clattenburg

15 December 2013 16	Norwich City	1–1	Swansea City	Norwich
13:30 GMT (UTC)	Hooper 45+4'	Report	Dyer 12'	Stadium: Carrow Road; Attendance: 26,876; Referee: Michael Oliver

21 December 2013 17	Sunderland	0–0	Norwich City	Sunderland
15:00 GMT (UTC)		Report		Stadium: Stadium of Light; Attendance: 37,778; Referee: Martin Atkinson

26 December 2013 18	Norwich City	1–2	Fulham	Norwich
15:00 GMT (UTC)	Hooper 13'	Report	Kasami 33'; Parker 87'	Stadium: Carrow Road; Attendance: 26,811; Referee: Jonathan Moss

28 December 2013 19	Norwich City	0–1	Manchester United	Norwich
15:00 GMT (UTC)		Report	Welbeck 57'	Stadium: Carrow Road; Attendance: 26,851; Referee: Phil Dowd

=== January ===
The new year started with a 1–1 draw in the return fixture against Crystal Palace at Selhurst Park. This was a poor game for Leroy Fer who gave away a penalty for the equaliser and was also sent off for a second yellow card in the 82nd minute. The run of games without a win continued when Norwich visited Liverpool to play Everton where goals from Gareth Barry and Kevin Mirallas saw Norwich come away with nothing. The following game saw loan signing Jonas Gutiérrez make his debut for Norwich and the 1–0 win saw Norwich move up to twelfth in the table level on points with visitors Hull. The midweek match which followed a weekend off at home to Newcastle ended in a goalless draw. Both teams finished with ten men after an altercation between Loïc Rémy and Bradley Johnson. Norwich appealed against the decision to send Johnson off. An Independent Regulatory Commission upheld the appeal and the red card was rescinded.

1 January 2014 20	Crystal Palace	1–1	Norwich City	London
15:00 GMT (UTC)	Puncheon 44' (pen.)	Report	Johnson 39'	Stadium: Selhurst Park; Attendance: 25,189; Referee: Mike Dean

11 January 2014 21	Everton	2–0	Norwich City	Liverpool
15:00 GMT (UTC)	Barry 23'; Mirallas 59'	Report		Stadium: Goodison Park; Attendance: 36,827; Referee: Kevin Friend

18 January 2014 22	Norwich City	1–0	Hull City	Norwich
15:00 GMT (UTC)	R. Bennett 87'	Report		Stadium: Carrow Road; Attendance: 26,655; Referee: Howard Webb

28 January 2014 23	Norwich City	0–0	Newcastle United	Norwich
19:45 GMT (UTC)		Report		Stadium: Carrow Road; Attendance: 26,762; Referee: Chris Foy

=== February ===
Robert Snodgrass scored early on to give Norwich the lead at half time during the Cardiff City away fixture. The second half of the game started with two quick goals from Craig Bellamy and Kenwyne Jones to see Cardiff come back to win the game. The next game was a visit from title challenging Manchester City which Norwich were expected to lose. Norwich defended well to earn a point and could have won the game when they had a goal disallowed for offside. The following Tuesday Norwich visited West Ham where two late goals from the home side saw them slip to one point above the relegation zone. The defeat saw pressure build once more on Chris Hughton following an interview with Norwich chief executive David McNally. The next match saw champions league chasing Tottenham Hotspur visit Carrow Road where a single Robert Snodgrass goal proving to be enough to take the lead and a number of fine saves saw John Ruddy ensure Norwich kept their fourth home clean sheet in a row.

1 February 2014 24	Cardiff City	2–1	Norwich City	Cardiff
15:00 GMT (UTC)	Bellamy 49'; Jones 50'	Report	Snodgrass 5'	Stadium: Cardiff City Stadium; Attendance: 26,748; Referee: Mark Clattenburg

8 February 2014 25	Norwich City	0–0	Manchester City	Norwich
15:00 GMT (UTC)		Report		Stadium: Carrow Road; Attendance: 26,832; Referee: Jonathan Moss

11 February 2014 26	West Ham United	2–0	Norwich City	London
19:45 GMT (UTC)	Collins 84'; Diamé 90+4'	Report		Stadium: Boleyn Ground; Attendance: 35,153; Referee: Michael Oliver

23 February 2014 27	Norwich City	1–0	Tottenham	Norwich
16:00 GMT (UTC)	Snodgrass 47'	Report		Stadium: Carrow Road; Attendance: 26,834; Referee: Craig Pawson

=== March ===
Norwich started their match against Aston Villa with a goal after three minutes by Wes Hoolahan, who nearly joined them in the January transfer window. Hoolahan's goal was a high point of the match after four goals were scored by the home side in sixteen minutes to consign Norwich to another away defeat. Norwich took the lead in the second half of their next match at home to Stoke City thanks to a goal from Bradley Johnson. Jonathan Walters equalised for Stoke City but shortly afterwards was sent off for a foul on Alex Tettey. Norwich failed to make use of the extra man and the game finished as a draw. The following week saw Norwich travel to Southampton where they conceded after five minutes. By eighty minutes Norwich looked out of the game when the score had increased to 3–0 to the home side. Two quick goals from Norwich raised hopes of an unlikely point but the result was put beyond doubt when Southampton scored in time added on to make the final score 4–2. The following game, at home to Sunderland, was another game that was billed as "must win" in the media. Goals from Robert Snodgrass and Alex Tettey saw Norwich cruise past Sunderland in the end and lifted them to thirteenth in the table and seven points clear of the bottom three. The trip to Swansea saw Norwich concede three goals and meant that Norwich had lost six away games in a row.

2 March 2014 28	Aston Villa	4–1	Norwich City	Birmingham
16:30 GMT (UTC)	Benteke 25', 27'; Bacuna 37'; Bassong 41' (o.g.)	Report	Hoolahan 3'	Stadium: Villa Park; Attendance: 30,303; Referee: Anthony Taylor

8 March 2014 29	Norwich City	1–1	Stoke City	Norwich
15:00 GMT (UTC)	Johnson 57'	Report	Walters 73' (pen.)	Stadium: Carrow Road; Attendance: 26,636; Referee: Andre Marriner

15 March 2014 30	Southampton	4–2	Norwich City	Southampton
15:00 GMT (UTC)	Schneiderlin 5'; Lambert 57'; Rodriguez 72'; Gallagher 90'	Report	Elmander 85'; Snodgrass 86'	Stadium: St Mary's Stadium; Attendance: 29,828; Referee: Kevin Friend

22 March 2014 31	Norwich City	2–0	Sunderland	Norwich
15:00 GMT (UTC)	Snodgrass 20'; Tettey 32'	report		Stadium: Carrow Road; Attendance: 26,654; Referee: Phil Dowd

29 March 2014 32	Swansea	3–0	Norwich City	Swansea
15:00 GMT (UTC)	De Guzmán 30', 38'; Routledge 75'	report		Stadium: Liberty Stadium; Referee: Jon Moss

=== April ===
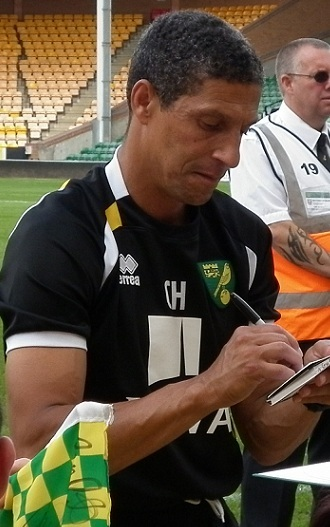
Chris Hughton who was Norwich City manager until April 2014

Their next match against West Brom was a crucial one, but a poor performance saw them lose by a single goal dragging them closer to the relegation zone. The defeat saw angry scenes after the game with fans chanting for Chris Hughton to be sacked and also saw John Ruddy climb over the barrier to remonstrate with one of the home fans in the Barclay Stand. This result was the final straw for the club board who sacked Chris Hughton along with Colin Calderwood and Paul Trollope and named Neil Adams as his replacement. Adams' first game in charge was against Fulham, a team that they had not beaten at Craven Cottage since 1986. The game was settled by a single first half Hugo Rodallega goal. Norwich entertained league leaders Liverpool for the Easter Sunday match. The game looked like turning into a rout when Liverpool scored two early goals but a strong second half saw Norwich fight back before eventually losing 2–3. Norwich's next game, at Manchester United, came at the end of a week which saw the hosts sack manager David Moyes and appoint Ryan Giggs as interim player-manager. Two goals apiece from Wayne Rooney and Juan Mata saw Norwich slump to their fifth defeat in a row overall and seventh away defeat in a row.

5 April 2014 33	Norwich City	0–1	West Bromwich Albion	Norwich
15:00 BST (UTC+01)		report	Amalfitano 16'	Stadium: Carrow Road; Attendance: 26,859; Referee: Mark Clattenburg

12 April 2014 34	Fulham	1–0	Norwich City	London
15:07 BST (UTC+01)	Rodallega 40'	report		Stadium: Craven Cottage; Referee: Mike Dean

20 April 2014 35	Norwich City	2–3	Liverpool	Norwich
12:00 BST (UTC+01)	Hooper 54'; Snodgrass 77'	Report	Sterling 4', 62'; Suárez 11'	Stadium: Carrow Road; Attendance: 26,857; Referee: Andre Marriner

26 April 2014 36	Manchester United	4–0	Norwich City	Greater Manchester
15:00 BST (UTC+01)	Rooney 41' (pen.), 48'; Mata 63', 73'	Report		Stadium: Old Trafford; Attendance: 75,208; Referee: Lee Probert

=== May ===
Norwich went into the final away match against Chelsea knowing that defeat would mean relegation to the Championship after Sunderland beat Manchester United the day before. Norwich ended a run of eight successive away defeats and five defeats overall by holding Chelsea to a goalless draw. This was their first away point since New Years Day. Norwich manager Neil Adams believed that his team should have got more from the game after they were denied a penalty. The result left Norwich favourites for relegation and two points behind fourth bottom Sunderland with one game left to play. Relegation was effectively sealed by a victory for Sunderland against West Brom which left Norwich three points behind West Brom with their vastly inferior goal difference. Relegation was confirmed on the final day of the season when they lost at home to Arsenal.

4 May 2014 37	Chelsea	0–0	Norwich City	London
16:00 BST (UTC+01)		Report		Stadium: Stamford Bridge; Attendance: 41,602; Referee: Neil Swarbrick

11 May 2014 38	Norwich City	0–2	Arsenal	Norwich
15:00 BST (UTC+01)		Report	Ramsey 53'; Jenkinson 62'	Stadium: Carrow Road; Attendance: 26,848; Referee: Lee Mason

=== League table ===
Pos	Team	Pld	W	D	L	GF	GA	GD	Pts	Qualification or relegation
16	Hull City	38	10	7	21	38	53	−15	37	Qualification for the Europa League third qualifying round (Note: Hull City qualified for the Europa League third qualifying round as runners-up of the 2013–14 FA Cup since winners Arsenal qualified for Champions League.)
17	West Bromwich Albion	38	7	15	16	43	59	−16	36	
18	Norwich City (R)	38	8	9	21	28	62	−34	33	Relegation to Football League Championship
19	Fulham (R)	38	9	5	24	40	85	−45	32	Relegation to Football League Championship
20	Cardiff City (R)	38	7	9	22	32	74	−42	30	Relegation to Football League Championship

Source: Barclays Premier League
Rules for classification: 1) Points; 2) Goal difference; 3) Goals scored; 4) Play-offs (only if needed to decide champion, teams for relegation or teams for UEFA competitions).
(R) Relegated

=== Results summary ===
Overall								Home						Away					
Pld	W	D	L	GF	GA	GD	Pts	W	D	L	GF	GA	GD	W	D	L	GF	GA	GD
38	8	9	21	28	62	−34	33	6	6	7	17	18	−1	2	3	14	11	44	−33

Last updated: 11 May 2014.
Source: Statto.com

=== Results by matchday ===
Matchday	1	2	3	4	5	6	7	8	9	10	11	12	13	14	15	16	17	18	19	20	21	22	23	24	25	26	27	28	29	30	31	32	33	34	35	36	37	38
Ground	H	A	H	A	H	A	H	A	H	A	H	A	H	A	A	H	A	H	H	A	A	H	H	A	H	A	H	A	H	A	H	A	H	A	H	A	A	H
Result	D	L	W	L	L	W	L	L	D	L	W	L	W	L	W	D	D	L	L	D	L	W	D	L	D	L	W	L	D	L	W	L	L	L	L	L	D	L
Position	7	14	8	13	17	14	17	18	18	18	15	16	14	16	14	14	14	14	14	15	15	12	12	15	16	16	14	15	15	15	13	15	17	17	17	17	18	18

Updated to match(es) played on 11 May 2014. Source: Statto.com
A = Away; H = Home; W = Win; D = Draw; L = Loss

== FA Cup ==
The third round of the FA Cup drew Norwich against Fulham, a team they had also played at home a week before in the league. Chris Hughton made eight changes to the team that played against Crystal Palace on New Year's Day. These included naming Josh Murphy in his starting line-up for the match, his first start for the club. During the game Josh Murphy was substituted for his twin brother Jacob Murphy who was making his professional début. The match finished 1–1 following a Robert Snodgrass equaliser on 45 minutes. Chris Hughton made six changes for the replay which finished 3–0 to the home side after goals from Darren Bent, Ashkan Dejagah and Steve Sidwell.

4 January 2014 R3	Norwich City	1–1	Fulham	Norwich
15:00 GMT (UTC)	Snodgrass 45'	report	Bent 39'	Stadium: Carrow Road; Attendance: 21,703; Referee: Roger East

14 January 2014 R3 replay	Fulham	3–0	Norwich City	London
19:45 GMT (UTC)	Bent 16'; Dejagah 41'; Sidwell 68'	report		Stadium: Craven Cottage; Attendance: 11,172; Referee: Lee Mason

== League Cup ==
Despite making eight changes to the starting eleven Norwich started their League Cup campaign brightly with an entertaining 6–3 win at home to Bury with Johan Elmander scoring two of the six goals. The third round of the cup saw Norwich win away at Watford 3–2. Norwich were two goals down on 55 minutes but a goal from Josh Murphy, who was making his professional début, on 77 minutes inspired an extra time comeback. Chris Hughton again made eight changes for the fifth round of the cup which saw Norwich travel to Manchester United where two late goals resulted in a one-sided looking 4–0 defeat.

27 August 2013 R2	Norwich City	6–3	Bury	Norwich
19:45 BST (UTC+01)	Olsson 23'; Pilkington 31'; Elmander 52', 75'; Fer 84'; Whittaker 90'	Report	Forrester 72'; Edjenguélé 79'; Reindorf 90'	Stadium: Carrow Road; Attendance: 16,110; Referee: James Adcock

24 September 2013 R3	Watford	2–3 (a.e.t.)	Norwich City	Watford
19:45 BST (UTC+01)	Acuña 23'; Faraoni 55'	Report	Murphy 77'; Hooper 90', 115'	Stadium: Vicarage Road; Attendance: 11,178; Referee: Stephen Martin

29 October 2013 R4	Manchester United	4–0	Norwich City	Manchester
19:45 GMT (UTC)	Hernández 20' (pen.), 54'; Jones 88'; Fábio 90+5'	Report		Stadium: Old Trafford; Attendance: 55,663; Referee: Kevin Friend

== Aftermath of the season ==
Finishing 18th in the Premier League resulted in relegation to the Championship for the following season. The Norwich City board announced shortly after relegation was confirmed on 11 May 2014 that a new manager would be announced within the week. On 22 May 2014, Neil Adams was named as the permanent manager despite the relegation from this season and four defeats in five matches as caretaker manager. The upheaval at the club was not limited to change in the management team, with a number of first team players being linked to moves away from Carrow Road, including Robert Snodgrass, Gary Hooper and John Ruddy. Chairman Alan Bowkett responded to the reports by stating that the club would be under no pressure to sell players during the transfer window.

The 2014 summer transfer window started for Norwich with attacking signings of Lewis Grabban from AFC Bournemouth and Kyle Lafferty from 2013–14 Serie B champions Palermo on 27 June. This was followed by the sale of Scotland international Robert Snodgrass to Hull City for a fee reported to be in the region of £7 million on 30 June 2014. On 5 August, Norwich announced the signing of former Queens Park Rangers midfielder Gary O'Neil following his release at the end of the previous season. Anthony Pilkington was the next to leave, joining promotion rivals Cardiff City for a reported fee of £1 million on 15 August. Newly promoted Queens Park Rangers completed the transfer of Leroy Fer for a reported fee of £8,000,000 on 20 August. Also on 20 August, it was announced that Carlos Cuéllar had signed a one-year deal following his release from Sunderland at the end of the previous season, and that Cameron Jerome had signed from Stoke City on a three-year deal for an undisclosed fee.

On 2 June 2014, Norwich named under-21 coach Mark Robson and former player Gary Holt first team coaches. They also named former player and Ipswich Town manager Joe Royle as football consultant.

There was criticism of the summer 2013 transfer activity, including at record signing Ricky van Wolfswinkel, who was rated as one of the worst signings of the season by various critics Norwich City chief executive David McNally admitted that the club had got the summer transfer window "horribly wrong".

Norwich City announced on 25 October 2014 that they made a profit of £6.7 million from the 2013–14 season, with their revenue rising to £95.5 million from £78.7 million the previous season. They also made £64.5 million from Premier League broadcast payments during the season, which was more than the £60.8 million that Manchester United received for winning the Premier League title the previous season.

== Statistics ==
Last updated: 11 May 2014

=== Overall competition record ===
Competition	Started round	Current position/round	Final position/round	First match	Last match	Record							
Competition	Started round	Current position/round	Final position/round	First match	Last match	P	W	D	L	GF	GA	GD	Win %
Premier League	—	18th		17 August 2013	11 May 2014	38	8	9	21	28	62	−34	21.05
League Cup	2nd round	—	4th round	27 August 2013	29 October 2013	3	2	0	1	9	9	+0	66.67
FA Cup	3rd round	—	3rd round	4 January 2014	14 January 2014	2	0	1	1	1	4	−3	0.00
Total						43	10	10	23	38	75	−37	23.26

=== Appearances, goals and cards ===
No.	Pos	Player	Status	Premier League			FA Cup			League Cup			Total			Discipline	
No.	Pos	Player	Status	Starts	Sub	Goals	Starts	Sub	Goals	Starts	Sub	Goals	Starts	Sub	Goals	Yellow card	Red card
1	GK	John Ruddy	HG	38	0	0	–	–	–	–	–	–	38	0	0	2	0
2	RB	Russell Martin	HG	29	2	0	2	0	0	2	0	0	33	2	0	2	0
3	RB	Steven Whittaker	PL	16	4	1	2	0	0	2	1	1	20	5	2	3	0
4	CM	Bradley Johnson	HG	28	4	3	1	0	0	3	0	0	32	4	3	6	1
5	CB	Sébastien Bassong	PL	27	0	0	1	0	0	2	0	0	30	0	0	1	0
6	CB	Michael Turner	HG	22	0	0	–	–	–	–	–	–	22	0	0	7	0
7	RW	Robert Snodgrass	PL	29	1	6	2	0	1	2	0	0	33	1	7	6	0
8	CM	Jonny Howson	HG	23	4	2	–	–	–	–	–	–	23	4	2	3	0
9	FW	Ricky van Wolfswinkel	PL	16	9	1	1	1	0	–	–	–	17	10	1	1	0
10	CM	Leroy Fer	PL	28	1	3	–	–	–	2	1	1	30	2	4	6	1
11	FW	Gary Hooper	HG	22	10	6	–	–	–	1	1	2	23	11	8	0	0
12	LW	Anthony Pilkington	HG	10	5	1	–	–	–	1	1	1	11	6	2	2	0
13	GK	Mark Bunn	HG	–	–	–	2	0	0	3	0	0	5	0	0	1	0
14	CAM	Wes Hoolahan	PL	10	6	1	–	–	–	3	0	0	14	6	1	1	0
15	RW	Jonás Gutiérrez	PL	2	2	0	–	–	–	–	–	–	2	2	0	0	0
16	FW	Johan Elmander	PL	16	13	1	2	0	0	2	1	2	20	14	3	4	0
17	RW	Elliott Bennett	HG	1	1	0	–	–	–	–	–	–	1	1	0	0	0
18	LB	Javier Garrido	PL	6	0	0	2	0	0	2	0	0	10	0	0	2	0
19	FW	Luciano Becchio	PL	0	5	0	0	1	0	0	1	0	0	7	0	0	0
20	GK	Carlo Nash	HG	–	–	–	–	–	–	–	–	–	–	–	–	–	–
22	LW	Nathan Redmond	U21	23	11	1	1	1	0	2	1	0	26	13	1	2	0
23	LB	Martin Olsson	HG	33	1	0	1	0	0	2	0	1	36	1	1	2	0
24	CB	Ryan Bennett	HG	14	2	1	1	0	0	3	0	0	18	2	1	6	0
25	CM	David Fox	HG	–	–	–	2	0	0	–	–	–	2	0	0	0	0
26	CB	Joseph Yobo	PL	8	0	0	–	–	–	–	–	–	8	0	0	0	0
27	CDM	Alexander Tettey	PL	17	4	1	–	–	–	1	0	0	18	4	1	8	0
31	LW	Josh Murphy	U21	0	9	0	2	0	0	0	2	1	2	11	1	1	0
32	RW	Jamar Loza	U21	0	1	0	–	–	–	–	–	–	0	1	0	0	0
Players away from the club on loan:
32	RW	Jacob Murphy	U21	–	–	–	0	1	0	–	–	–	0	1	0	0	0
–	GK	Declan Rudd	–	–	–	–	–	–	–	–	–	–	–	–	–	–	–
–	CM	Andrew Surman	–	–	–	–	–	–	–	–	–	–	–	–	–	–	–

Status (Premier League eligibility):

HG = Home grown player named in 25-man squad
PL = Non home grown player named in 25-man squad
U21 = Under 21 players

Source: Premier League Squad list:

=== Goalscorers ===
Rank	Pos.	Player	PL	FAC	LC	Total
1	FW	Gary Hooper	6	0	2	8
2	MF	Robert Snodgrass	6	1	0	7
3	MF	Leroy Fer	3	0	1	4
4	FW	Johan Elmander	1	0	2	3
4	MF	Bradley Johnson	3	0	0	3
6	MF	Jonny Howson	2	0	0	2
6	MF	Anthony Pilkington	1	0	1	2
6	DF	Steven Whittaker	1	0	1	2
9	DF	Ryan Bennett	1	0	0	1
9	MF	Wes Hoolahan	1	0	0	1
9	MF	Josh Murphy	0	0	1	1
9	DF	Martin Olsson	0	0	1	1
9	MF	Nathan Redmond	1	0	0	1
9	MF	Alexander Tettey	1	0	0	1
9	FW	Ricky van Wolfswinkel	1	0	0	1
Own goals			0	0	0	0
Totals			28	1	9	38

=== Other statistics ===
- Norwich's total of 28 league goals in total were the fewest in the 2013–14 Premier League season.
- Only two teams, Fulham and Cardiff, conceded more goals than Norwich during the League season.
- Norwich's 14 away defeats was the most in the league.
- Norwich's 9 away points was the worst in the league.
- Norwich's 8 away defeats in a row was the joint worst in the league.

== See also ==
- List of Norwich City F.C. seasons
