= 2013–14 Bury F.C. season =

Bury F.C.
2013–14 season
- Chairman: Stewart Day
- Manager: Kevin Blackwell (until 14 October); Ronnie Jepson (14 October – 9 December); David Flitcroft (from 9 December)
- League Two: 12th
- FA Cup: First round
- League Cup: Second round
- Football League Trophy: Northern first round
Home colours	Away colours	Third colours

During the 2013–14 season, Bury competed in the fourth tier of English football, Football League Two.

== Season summary ==
Manager Kevin Blackwell was sacked on 14 October 2013, with Bury 21st in the table. Blackwell's assistant Ronnie Jepson was appointed as caretaker manager, and on 25 October 2013, Jepson was given the role of manager until January. On 9 December 2013, Jepson was replaced by David Flitcroft.

== League table ==
Pos	Team	Pld	W	D	L	GF	GA	GD	Pts
10	Plymouth Argyle	46	16	12	18	51	58	−7	60
11	Mansfield Town	46	15	15	16	49	58	−9	60
12	Bury	46	13	20	13	59	51	+8	59
13	Portsmouth	46	14	17	15	56	66	−10	59
14	Newport County	46	14	16	16	56	59	−3	58

Updated to match(es) played on 3 May 2014. Source: BBC Sport
Rules for classification: 1) Points; 2) Goal difference; 3) Number of goals scored

== First-team squad ==
As of 28 September 2013

Note: Flags indicate national team as defined under FIFA eligibility rules; some limited exceptions apply. Players may hold more than one non-FIFA nationality.

No.	Pos.	Nation	Player
1	GK	NIR	Trevor Carson
2	DF	ENG	Shaun Beeley (on loan from Fleetwood Town)
4	DF	ENG	Richard Hinds
5	DF	ENG	Nathan Cameron
6	MF	ENG	Andrew Procter (second vice-captain)
7	MF	WAL	Craig Jones
8	MF	ENG	Tommy Miller
9	FW	ENG	Anton Forrester (on loan from Blackburn Rovers)
10	FW	ENG	Ashley Grimes
12	MF	ENG	Chris Sedgwick
15	MF	ENG	Danny Mayor
19	MF	ENG	Tom Soares (vice-captain)
21	GK	DEN	Brian Jensen
22	MF	ESP	Marco Navas
25	DF	FRA	William Edjenguélé
26	GK	ENG	Rob Lainton
30	GK	ENG	Reice Charles-Cook
35	FW	ENG	Tope Obadeyi
—	DF	ENG	Phil Picken

== Results and fixtures ==
=== League One ===
League Two match details
Date	Opponents	Venue	Result	Score F–A	Scorers	Attendance	Ref.
3 August 2013	Chesterfield	H	L	0–2		4,337	
10 August 2013	Oxford United	A	L	1–2			
17 August 2013	Accrington Stanley	H	W	3–0			
24 August 2013	Burton Albion	A	D	2–2			
31 August 2013	Cheltenham Town	H	W	4–1	Mayor 9', Procter 12', Cameron 17', Reindorf 76'		
7 September 2013	Rochdale	A	L	0–1		5,616	
14 September 2013	Fleetwood Town	A	L	1–2	Soares 28'	3,520	
21 September 2013	Southend United	H	D	1–1			
28 September 2013	Dagenham & Redbridge	A	L	1–2	Forrester 89'	1,604	
5 October 2013	Newport County	H	D	0–0			
12 October 2013	Morecambe	H	L	0–2			
19 October 2013	Portsmouth	A	L	0–1			
22 October 2013	Mansfield Town	H	D	0–0			
26 October 2013	Wycombe Wanderers	A	W	2–1	Soares 69', Edjenguélé 88'	3,350	
2 November 2013	Torquay United	H	L	1–3			
16 November 2013	Bristol Rovers	A	D	1–1			
23 November 2013	AFC Wimbledon	H	D	1–1			
26 November 2013	Hartlepool United	H	W	1–0			
30 November 2013	Exeter City	A	D	2–2	Nardiello 15', Cameron 47'	3,426	
14 December 2013	Northampton Town	H	D	1–1			
21 December 2013	Plymouth Argyle	A	L	1–2	Sedgwick 49'	6,206	
26 December 2013	Scunthorpe United	H	D	2–2			
29 December 2013	York City	H	W	2–1	Forrester 1', Cameron 19'	3,706	
1 January 2014	Hartlepool United	A	W	3–0	Mayor 5', Nardiello 12', Hinds 75'	3,529	
11 January 2014	Chesterfield	A	L	0–4		6,053	
18 January 2014	Burton Albion	H	D	0–0		2,910	
1 February 2014	Wycombe Wanderers	H	W	1–0	Forrester 34'	2,818	
4 February 2014	Oxford United	H	D	1–1	Jones 56'	2,303	
18 February 2014	Accrington Stanley	A	D	0–0		2,184	
22 February 2014	AFC Wimbledon	A	W	1–0	Mayor 90+4'	3,740	
25 February 2014	Mansfield Town	A	W	4–1	Mayor 25', Nardiello 56', 64', Carroll 71'	2,628	
1 March 2014	Cheltenham Town	A	L	1–2	Platt 16'	2,737	
7 March 2014	Rochdale	H	D	0–0		6,295	
11 March 2014	Fleetwood Town	H	D	2–2	Nardiello 47', 61' pen.	2,467	
15 March 2014	Southend United	A	D	0–0		5,680	
18 March 2014	Torquay United	A	L	1–2	Platt 66'	1,738	
22 March 2014	Dagenham & Redbridge	H	D	1–1	Hussey 60'	2,705	
25 March 2014	Newport County	A	D	0–0		2,160	
29 March 2014	Northampton Town	A	W	3–0	Hope 18', Mayor 35', Rose 90+2'	4,631	
1 April 2014	Bristol Rovers	H	W	2–1	Hope 3', Soares 80'	2,314	
5 April 2014	Exeter City	H	W	2–0	Hussey 65', Soares 90+2'	2,718	
12 April 2014	Scunthorpe United	A	D	2–2	Soares 69', Rose 90+5'	4,162	
18 April 2014	Plymouth Argyle	H	W	4–0	Tutte 8', Nardiello 50' pen., 53', Rose 88'	3,401	
21 April 2014	York City	A	L	0–1		5,225	
26 April 2014	Portsmouth	H	D	4–4	Hope 10', 34', 87', Procter 49'	4,759	
3 May 2014	Morecambe	A	D	0–0		2,944	

=== FA Cup ===
FA Cup match details
Round	Date	Opponents	Venue	Result	Score F–A	Scorers	Attendance	Ref.
First round	19 November 2013	Cambridge United	H	D	0–0		1,712	
First round replay	3 December 2013	Cambridge United	A	L	1–2	Harrad 63'	3,342	

=== League Cup ===
League Cup match details
Round	Date	Opponents	Venue	Result	Score F–A	Scorers	Attendance	Ref.
First round	6 August 2013	Crewe Alexandra	H	W	3–2	Beeley 20', Harrad 29' pen., Hinds 49'	2,146	
Second round	27 August 2013	Norwich City	A	L	3–6	Forrester 72', Edjenguélé 79', Reindorf 90+3'	16,107	

=== Football League Trophy ===
Football League Trophy match details
Round	Date	Opponents	Venue	Result	Score F–A	Scorers	Attendance	Ref.
First round	3 September 2013	Port Vale	A	L	1–2	Sedgwick 71'	2,351	

== Transfers ==
=== Transfers in ===
Date	Pos.	Player	Club	Fee	Ref.
27 June 2013	DF	Gareth Roberts	Derby County		
28 June 2013	DF	Nathan Cameron	Coventry City		
1 July 2013	MF	Andrew Procter	Preston North End		
8 July 2013	GK	Rob Lainton	Bolton Wanderers		
10 July 2013	FW	John Rooney	Barnsley	Free transfer	
10 July 2013	MF	Chris Sedgwick	Hyde United	Free transfer	
17 July 2013	DF	Richard Hinds	Yeovil Town	Free transfer	
23 July 2013	FW	Aidan Chippendale	Accrington Stanley	Free transfer	
25 July 2013	FW	Jessy Reindorf	Union Royale Namur	Free transfer	
31 July 2013	FW	Marlon Jackson	Hereford United	Free transfer	
16 August 2013	MF	Marco Navas	Recreativo de Huelva		
19 August 2013	MF	Tommy Miller	Swindon Town		
20 August 2013	DF	William Edjenguele	Coventry City		
2 September 2013	GK	Brian Jensen	Burnley		
June 2013	FW	Ashley Grimes	Rochdale		
2013	FW	Tope Obadeyi	Rio Ave		
3 January 2014	DF	Pablo Mills	Rotherham United	Free transfer	
30 January 2014	FW	Daniel Nardiello	Rotherham United	Free transfer	

=== Loans in ===
Date	Pos.	Player	Club	Duration	Ref.
18 July 2013	FW	Anton Forrester	Blackburn Rovers	Until 1 January 2014	
2013	MF	Danny Mayor	Sheffield Wednesday		
30 July 2013	DF	Shaun Beeley	Fleetwood Town	Until January 2014	
7 August 2013	MF	Jordan Sinnott	Huddersfield Town	Six-month loan	

=== Out ===
Date	Pos.	Player	Club	Fee	Ref.
16 January 2014	FW	Shaun Harrad	Alfreton Town	Released	
16 January 2014	DF	Gareth Roberts	Notts County	Released	
16 January 2014	FW	Marlon Jackson	Halifax Town	Released	
16 January 2014	MF	Euan Holden	—N/a	Released	
16 January 2014	FW	Jessy Reindorf	Tamworth	Released	

=== Loans out ===
Date	Pos.	Player	Club	Duration	Ref.
25 October 2013	FW	Marlon Jackson	Lincoln City	Until December 2013	
