= 2013–14 Football League Cup =

Capital One Cup, League Cup

Tournament details
- Country: England; Wales
- Dates: 5 August 2013 – 2 March 2014
- Teams: 92

Final positions
- Champions: Manchester City (3rd title)
- Runners-up: Sunderland

Tournament statistics
- Matches played: 93
- Goals scored: 255 (2.74 per match)
- Top goal scorer(s): Edin Džeko; Álvaro Negredo (6 goals each)

The 2013–14 Football League Cup (known as the Capital One Cup for sponsorship reasons) was the 54th season of the Football League Cup, a knock-out competition for the top 92 football clubs played in English football league system. Swansea City were the defending champions, but were eliminated by Birmingham City in the 3rd round.

Numbers within brackets represented a team's league level in the 2013–14 season, level 1 being the Premier League, level 2 the Championship, and so on.

On 16 December 2013, it was announced that goal-line technology would be used in three of the four quarter-finals and any subsequent matches in the tournament. The system was used the very next day, in the Sunderland – Chelsea quarter-final, in which an own-goal from Lee Cattermole was allowed.

The cup was won by Manchester City who defeated Sunderland 3–1 in the final. This was their first League Cup trophy since 1976 and their third win overall.

== First round ==
The draw for the first round took place on 17 June 2013 at 09:30 BST. Ties were played during the week commencing 5 August 2013.

=== Northern section ===
5 August 2013	Preston North End (3)	1–0	Blackpool (2)	Deepdale, Preston
19:45 BST	Clarke 87'	Report		Attendance: 17,470; Referee: Andy Madley

6 August 2013	Bury (4)	3–2	Crewe Alexandra (3)	Gigg Lane, Bury
19:45 BST	Beeley 20'; Harrad 29' (pen.); Hinds 49'	Report	Aneke 5'; Davis 75' (pen.)	Attendance: 2,146; Referee: Mark Brown

6 August 2013	Shrewsbury Town (3)	1–3	Bolton Wanderers (2)	New Meadow, Shrewsbury
19:45 BST	Wildig 29'	Report	Hall 26'; Odelusi 43', 52'	Attendance: 3,456; Referee: Stephen Bratt

6 August 2013	Middlesbrough (2)	1–2	Accrington Stanley (4)	Riverside Stadium, Middlesbrough
19:45 BST	Jutkiewicz 9'	Report	Carver 40'; Mingoia 81'	Attendance: 6,774; Referee: Scott Duncan

6 August 2013	Doncaster Rovers (2)	1–0	Rochdale (4)	Keepmoat Stadium, Doncaster
19:45 BST	Khumalo 89'	Report		Attendance: 4,368; Referee: Gary Sutton

6 August 2013	Barnsley (2)	0–0 (a.e.t.) (5–4 p)	Scunthorpe United (4)	Oakwell, Barnsley
19:45 BST		Report		Attendance: 5,238; Referee: Paul Tierney
	Penalties
	Dagnall (penalty missed); Scotland (penalty missed); Cywka (penalty scored); Dawson (penalty scored); Perkins (penalty scored); Steele (penalty missed); O'Brien (penalty missed); Golbourne (penalty scored); O'Grady (penalty scored)		(penalty missed) Hawkridge; (penalty scored) Collins; (penalty missed) Sparrow; (penalty scored) Iwelumo; (penalty scored) Godden; (penalty missed) Welsh; (penalty missed) Slocombe; (penalty scored) Mirfin; (penalty missed) Canavan

6 August 2013	Tranmere Rovers (3)	2–0	Mansfield Town (4)	Prenton Park, Birkenhead
19:45 BST	Robinson 2'; Atkinson 45+1'	Report		Attendance: 3,067; Referee: David Webb

6 August 2013	York City (4)	0–4	Burnley (2)	Bootham Crescent, York
19:45 BST		Report	Jones 12'; Stanislas 61'; Ings 78'; Arfield 82'	Attendance: 3,922; Referee: Tony Harrington

6 August 2013	Sheffield United (3)	1–2	Burton Albion (4)	Bramall Lane, Sheffield
19:45 BST	Doyle 64'	Report	Hussey 50', 90+5'	Attendance: 6,191; Referee: Eddie Ilderton

6 August 2013	Oldham Athletic (3)	0–1	Derby County (2)	Boundary Park, Oldham
19:45 BST		Report	Jacobs 20'	Attendance: 5,000; Referee: Rob Lewis

6 August 2013	Morecambe (4)	1–0	Wolverhampton Wanderers (3)	Globe Arena, Morecambe
19:45 BST	Williams 84'	Report		Attendance: 2,545; Referee: Geoff Eltringham

6 August 2013	Nottingham Forest (2)	3–1	Hartlepool United (4)	The City Ground, Nottingham
19:45 BST	Majewski 33'; Halford 65'; Derbyshire 67'	Report	Austin 76'	Attendance: 9,081; Referee: Stephen Martin

6 August 2013	Huddersfield Town (2)	2–1	Bradford City (3)	John Smith's Stadium, Huddersfield
19:45 BST	Vaughan 42', 54'	Report	Wells 90'	Attendance: 11,630; Referee: Mark Haywood

6 August 2013	Port Vale (3)	1–2	Walsall (3)	Vale Park, Burslem
19:45 BST	Robertson 59'	Report	Westcarr 43'; Baxendale 84'	Attendance: 4,013; Referee: Andy Haines

6 August 2013	Rotherham United (3)	2–1	Sheffield Wednesday (2)	New York Stadium, Rotherham
20:00 BST	Pringle 10'; Frecklington 38'	Report	McCabe 23'	Attendance: 11,433; Referee: Darren Drysdale

7 August 2013	Notts County (3)	3–2	Fleetwood Town (4)	Meadow Lane, Nottingham
19:45 BST	Showunmi 28'; Haynes 40'; McGregor 73'	Report	Evans 16'; Ball 88'	Attendance: 2,115; Referee: Keith Hill

7 August 2013	Leeds United (2)	2–1	Chesterfield (4)	Elland Road, Leeds
19:45 BST	Brown 28'; Poleon 31'	Report	Doyle 18'	Attendance: 17,466; Referee: Carl Boyeson

7 August 2013	Carlisle United (3)	3–3 (a.e.t.) (4–3 p)	Blackburn Rovers (2)	Brunton Park, Carlisle
19:45 BST	Amoo 14', 113'; Guy 62'	Report	Cairney 51'; Taylor 56'; Judge 95'	Attendance: 4,372; Referee: Richard Clark
	Penalties
	Salmon (penalty missed); Beck (penalty scored); Berrett (penalty scored); Noble (penalty scored); Symington (penalty scored)		(penalty scored) Judge; (penalty scored) Lowe; (penalty scored) Rhodes; (penalty missed) Taylor; (penalty missed) Morris

=== Southern section ===
6 August 2013	Gillingham (3)	0–2	Bristol City (3)	Priestfield Stadium, Gillingham
19:45 BST		Report	Baldock 21'; Wynter 66'	Attendance: 2,585; Referee: Darren Deadman

6 August 2013	AFC Bournemouth (2)	1–0	Portsmouth (4)	Dean Court, Bournemouth
19:45 BST	O'Kane 54'	Report		Attendance: 7,620; Referee: Fred Graham

6 August 2013	Wycombe Wanderers (4)	1–2	Leicester City (2)	Adams Park, High Wycombe
19:45 BST	Kuffour 21'	Report	Nugent 14' (pen.); St Ledger 90+6'	Attendance: 3,158; Referee: Tim Robinson

6 August 2013	Brentford (3)	3–2	Dagenham & Redbridge (4)	Griffin Park, Brentford
19:45 BST	El Alagui 62', 90+5'; Fillo 64'	Report	Nugent 18' (o.g.); Scott 81'	Attendance: 3,586; Referee: Pat Miller

6 August 2013	Exeter City (4)	0–2	Queens Park Rangers (2)	St James Park, Exeter
19:45 BST		Report	Austin 3'; Simpson 50'	Attendance: 5,253; Referee: Jeremy Simpson

6 August 2013	Charlton Athletic (2)	4–0	Oxford United (4)	The Valley, Charlton
19:45 BST	Church 18', 57'; Green 49'; Pigott 90+6'	Report		Attendance: 4,935; Referee: Andrew Davies

6 August 2013	Southend United (4)	0–1	Yeovil Town (2)	Roots Hall, Southend-on-Sea
19:45 BST		Report	Dawson 36'	Attendance: 2,971; Referee: Lee Collins

6 August 2013	Millwall (2)	2–1	AFC Wimbledon (4)	The Den, Bermondsey
19:45 BST	Keogh 52'; Woolford 76'	Report	L. Moore 90'	Attendance: 4,443; Referee: James Linington

6 August 2013	Swindon Town (3)	1–0	Torquay United (4)	The County Ground, Swindon
19:45 BST	Williams 83'	Report		Attendance: 5,662; Referee: Andy D'Urso

6 August 2013	Birmingham City (2)	3–2 (a.e.t.)	Plymouth Argyle (4)	St Andrew's, Birmingham
19:45 BST	Allan 49', 84'; Bartley 92'	Report	Alessandra 61', 90+2'	Attendance: 10,178; Referee: Graham Salisbury

6 August 2013	Stevenage (3)	2–0	Ipswich Town (2)	Broadhall Way, Stevenage
19:45 BST	Morais 51'; Burrow 76'	Report		Referee: Gavin Ward

6 August 2013	Cheltenham Town (4)	4–3 (a.e.t.)	Crawley Town (3)	Whaddon Road, Cheltenham
19:45 BST	Richards 40'; Gornell 70'; Harrison 75', 114'	Report	Alexander 23'; Adams 59', 65'	Attendance: 1,562; Referee: Oliver Langford

6 August 2013	Bristol Rovers (4)	1–3	Watford (2)	Memorial Stadium, Horfield
19:45 BST	Richards 41'	Report	Murray 19', 35'; Angella 30'	Attendance: 4,875; Referee: Darren Sheldrake

6 August 2013	Northampton Town (4)	1–2	Milton Keynes Dons (3)	Sixfields Stadium, Northampton
19:45 BST	O'Donovan 77'	Report	Reeves 13'; Banton 54'	Attendance: 3,486; Referee: Chris Sarginson

6 August 2013	Leyton Orient (3)	3–2	Coventry City (3)	Matchroom Stadium, Leyton
19:45 BST	Lisbie 26', 89'; Cox 37'	Report	Baker 22'; Moussa 59'	Attendance: 2,871; Referee: Dean Whitestone

6 August 2013	Colchester United (3)	1–5	Peterborough United (3)	Colchester Community Stadium, Colchester
19:45 BST	Ibehre 47'	Report	Zakuani 42'; Barnett 59'; Rowe 68'; Tomlin 71', 80'	Attendance: 2,368; Referee: Trevor Kettle

6 August 2013	Brighton & Hove Albion (2)	1–3 (a.e.t.)	Newport County (4)	Falmer Stadium, Falmer
19:45 BST	Barnes 18'	Report	Crow 81', 94'; Washington 103'	Attendance: 8,409; Referee: Brendan Malone

== Second round ==
The draw for the second round took place on 8 August 2013 at 12:30 BST. All the Premier League clubs that were not partaking in European competition (UEFA Champions League or Europa League) entered in this round along with Reading who were one of the two best relegated teams from the prior season. Wigan Athletic, who were the other of the two best relegated teams did not enter in this round, due to winning the FA Cup and thus a place in the UEFA Europa League. They entered in the third round. All ties were played during the week commencing 26 August 2013.

27 August 2013	Carlisle United (3)	2–5	Leicester City (2)	Brunton Park, Carlisle
19:45 BST	Amoo 16'; Berrett 71'	Report	Wood 38', 59' (pen.), 63'; Dyer 47'; Knockaert 51'	Attendance: 3,308; Referee: Graham Salisbury

27 August 2013	Doncaster Rovers (2)	1–3	Leeds United (2)	Keepmoat Stadium, Doncaster
19:45 BST	Paynter 63'	Report	Wootton 41'; Smith 77'; McCormack 80' (pen.)	Attendance: 10,890; Referee: Scott Mathieson

27 August 2013	Sunderland (1)	4–2	Milton Keynes Dons (3)	Stadium of Light, Sunderland
19:45 BST	Altidore 78'; Wickham 87', 89'; Johnson 90+6'	Report	Bamford 7'; McLeod 55'	Attendance: 18,992; Referee: David Coote

27 August 2013	West Bromwich Albion (1)	3–0	Newport County (4)	The Hawthorns, West Bromwich
20:00 BST	Berahino 7', 26', 38' (pen.)	Report		Attendance: 8,955; Referee: Andy D'Urso

27 August 2013	Bristol City (3)	2–1	Crystal Palace (1)	Ashton Gate Stadium, Bristol
19:45 BST	Emmanuel-Thomas 59'; Wagstaff 71'	Report	Garvan 90+4'	Attendance: 6,816; Referee: Ian Williamson

27 August 2013	Peterborough United (3)	6–0	Reading (2)	London Road, Peterborough
19:45 BST	Assombalonga 4'; Tomlin 19', 54' (pen.), 79' (pen.); Swanson 28'; Payne 90+3'	Report		Attendance: 4,496; Referee: Keith Hill

27 August 2013	Barnsley (2)	1–5	Southampton (1)	Oakwell, Barnsley
19:45 BST	Dawson 53'	Report	Davis 26', 89' (pen.); Rodriguez 49'; Mayuka 66'; Ramírez 90+1'	Attendance: 6,574; Referee: Scott Duncan

27 August 2013	Burton Albion (4)	2–2 (a.e.t.) (4–5 p)	Fulham (1)	Pirelli Stadium, Burton upon Trent
19:45 BST	Dyer 85'; Symes 102'	Report	Taarabt 36'; Rodallega 117'	Attendance: 4,002; Referee: Andy Madley
	Penalties
	Symes (penalty scored); Reed (penalty scored); Edwards (penalty missed); McCrory (penalty scored); Hussey (penalty scored)		(penalty scored) Bent; (penalty scored) Ruiz; (penalty scored) Riether; (penalty scored) Rodallega; (penalty scored) Riise

27 August 2013	Burnley (2)	2–0	Preston North End (3)	Turf Moor, Burnley
19:45 BST	Trippier 6'; Ings 34'	Report		Attendance: 10,648; Referee: Paul Tierney

27 August 2013	Liverpool (1)	4–2 (a.e.t.)	Notts County (3)	Anfield, Liverpool
19:45 BST	Sterling 4'; Sturridge 29', 105+4'; Henderson 110'	Report	Arquin 62'; Phillip 84'	Attendance: 42,231

27 August 2013	Norwich City (1)	6–3	Bury (4)	Carrow Road, Norwich
19:45 BST	Olsson 23'; Pilkington 31'; Elmander 52', 75'; Fer 84'; Whittaker 90'	Report	Forrester 72'; Edjenguele 79'; Reindorf 90+3'	Attendance: 16,107

27 August 2013	Leyton Orient (3)	0–1 (a.e.t.)	Hull City (1)	Matchroom Stadium, Leyton
19:45 BST		Report	Brady 107'	Attendance: 3,181

27 August 2013	Huddersfield Town (2)	3–2	Charlton Athletic (2)	John Smith's Stadium, Huddersfield
19:45 BST	Lynch 40'; Hogg 77'; Hammill 82'	Report	Stephens 32'; Sordell 59'	Attendance: 6,250

27 August 2013	Tranmere Rovers (3)	1–1 (a.e.t.) (4–2 p)	Bolton Wanderers (2)	Prenton Park, Birkenhead
19:45 BST	Stockton 45+2'	Report	Beckford 66'	Attendance: 3,379
	Penalties
	Power (penalty scored); Akpa Akpro (penalty scored); Horwood (penalty scored); Rowe (penalty scored)		(penalty missed) Moritz; (penalty scored) Beckford; (penalty scored) Mills; (penalty missed) Baptiste

27 August 2013	Queens Park Rangers (2)	0–2	Swindon Town (3)	Loftus Road, Shepherd's Bush
19:45 BST		Report	Ranger 38'; Pritchard 90+1'	Attendance: 9,715

27 August 2013	Derby County (2)	5–0	Brentford (3)	Pride Park Stadium, Derby
19:45 BST	Martin 19', 77'; Sammon 36', 71'; Hughes 38'	Report		Attendance: 9,076

27 August 2013	Yeovil Town (2)	3–3 (a.e.t.) (2–3 p)	Birmingham City (2)	Huish Park, Yeovil
19:45 BST	Upson 21'; Webster 90+1'; Ayling 105'	Report	Bartley 20'; Shinnie 44'; Novak 106'	Attendance: 3,769
	Penalties
	Hoskins (penalty missed); Seaborne (penalty scored); Upson (penalty missed); McAllister (penalty missed); Dawson (penalty scored)		(penalty scored) Burke; (penalty missed) Eardley; (penalty missed) Allan; (penalty scored) Ambrose; (penalty scored) Adeyemi

27 August 2013	West Ham United (1)	2–1	Cheltenham Town (4)	Boleyn Ground, Upton Park, London
19:45 BST	Vaz Tê 42'; Ravel 46'	Report	Richards 59' (pen.)

28 August 2013	Nottingham Forest (2)	2–1 (a.e.t.)	Millwall (2)	City Ground, Nottingham
19:45 BST	Derbyshire 59'; Lascelles 94'	Report	Feeney 86'	Attendance: 12,201

28 August 2013	Everton (1)	2–1 (a.e.t.)	Stevenage (3)	Goodison Park, Liverpool
19:45 BST	Deulofeu 45+3'; Fellaini 115'	Report	Freeman 36'	Attendance: 22,730; Referee: Keith Stroud

28 August 2013	Stoke City (1)	3–1	Walsall (3)	Britannia Stadium, Stoke-on-Trent
19:45 BST	Jones 22', 31', 84'	Report	Hemmings 57'	Attendance: 11,667; Referee: Michael Naylor

28 August 2013	Aston Villa (1)	3–0	Rotherham United (3)	Villa Park, Birmingham
19:45 BST	Weimann 19'; Benteke 40'; Delph 53'	Report		Attendance: 22,447

28 August 2013	Morecambe (4)	0–2	Newcastle United (1)	Globe Arena, Morecambe
19:45 BST		Report	Shola Ameobi 84'; Sammy Ameobi 90+4'	Attendance: 5,375

28 August 2013	Watford (2)	2–0	AFC Bournemouth (2)	Vicarage Road, Watford
19:45 BST	Ward 13' (o.g.); Battocchio 66'	Report		Attendance: 9,824

28 August 2013	Accrington Stanley (4)	0–2	Cardiff City (1)	Crown Ground, Accrington
19:45 BST		Report	Maynard 61'; Gestede 62'	Attendance: 1,617

== Third round ==
The draw for the third round took place live on Sky Sports on 28 August 2013. All the clubs partaking in European competition (holders Swansea City, Manchester United, Manchester City, Chelsea, Arsenal, Tottenham Hotspur and Wigan Athletic) entered here, as well as the winning teams from the second round. Only Crystal Palace from the Premier League failed to make it to the third round, and only Bristol City, Swindon Town, Peterborough United and Tranmere Rovers remained from League One.

24 September 2013	Sunderland (1)	2–0	Peterborough United (3)	Stadium of Light, Sunderland
19:45 BST	Giaccherini 32'; Roberge 74'	Report		Attendance: 18,126; Referee: Michael Naylor

24 September 2013	West Ham United (1)	3–2	Cardiff City (1)	Boleyn Ground, Upton Park, London
19:45 BST	Morrison 1'; Jarvis 8'; Vaz Tê 88'	Report	Noone 45'; Odemwingie 76'	Attendance: 18,611; Referee: Roger East

24 September 2013	Manchester City (1)	5–0	Wigan Athletic (2)	Etihad Stadium, Manchester
19:45 BST	Džeko 33'; Jovetić 60', 83'; Touré 76'; Navas 86'	Report		Attendance: 25,519; Referee: Kevin Friend

24 September 2013	Burnley (2)	2–1	Nottingham Forest (2)	Turf Moor, Burnley
19:45 BST	Ings 45', 68'	Report	Derbyshire 24'	Attendance: 6,405; Referee: Darren Drysdale

24 September 2013	Southampton (1)	2–0	Bristol City (3)	St Mary's Stadium, Southampton
19:45 BST	Ramírez 15'; Hooiveld 83'	Report		Attendance: 8,539; Referee: Graham Scott

24 September 2013	Swindon Town (3)	0–2	Chelsea (1)	County Ground, Swindon
19:45 BST		Report	Torres 29'; Ramires 35'	Attendance: 14,924; Referee: Michael Oliver

24 September 2013	Watford (2)	2–3 (a.e.t.)	Norwich City (1)	Vicarage Road, Watford
19:45 BST	Acuña 23'; Faraoni 55'	Report	Murphy 77'; Hooper 90+4', 115'	Attendance: 11,178; Referee: Stephen Martin

24 September 2013	Aston Villa (1)	0–4	Tottenham Hotspur (1)	Villa Park, Birmingham
19:45 BST		Report	Defoe 45+1', 90'; Paulinho 49'; Chadli 86'	Attendance: 22,975; Referee: Jon Moss

24 September 2013	Hull City (1)	1–0	Huddersfield Town (2)	KC Stadium, Kingston upon Hull
19:45 BST	Proschwitz 59'	Report		Attendance: 7,151; Referee: Simon Hooper

24 September 2013	Leicester City (2)	2–1	Derby County (2)	King Power Stadium, Leicester
19:45 BST	Knockaert 78'; Drinkwater 81'	Report	Martin 42'	Attendance: 14,043; Referee: Dean Whitestone

24 September 2013	Fulham (1)	2–1	Everton (1)	Craven Cottage, Fulham
20:00 BST	Berbatov 54'; Bent 68'	Report	Naismith 12'	Attendance: 14,627; Referee: Martin Atkinson

25 September 2013	Manchester United (1)	1–0	Liverpool (1)	Old Trafford, Manchester
19:45 BST	Hernández 46'	Report		Attendance: 65,701; Referee: Mark Clattenburg

25 September 2013	Newcastle United (1)	2–0	Leeds United (2)	St James' Park, Newcastle upon Tyne
19:45 BST	Cissé 31'; Gouffran 67'	Report		Attendance: 36,220; Referee: Mike Jones

25 September 2013	West Bromwich Albion (1)	1–1 (a.e.t.) (3–4 p)	Arsenal (1)	The Hawthorns, West Bromwich
20:00 BST	Berahino 71'	Report	Eisfeld 61'	Attendance: 18,649; Referee: Robert Madley
	Penalties
	Reid (penalty scored); Rosenberg (penalty scored); Morrison (penalty scored); Dawson (penalty missed); Amalfitano (penalty missed)		(penalty scored) Bendtner; (penalty missed) Gnabry; (penalty scored) Olsson; (penalty scored) Akpom; (penalty scored) Monreal

25 September 2013	Tranmere Rovers (3)	0–2	Stoke City (1)	Prenton Park, Birkenhead
19:45 BST		Report	Ireland 23'; Crouch 90'	Attendance: 5,559; Referee: David Coote

25 September 2013	Birmingham City (2)	3–1	Swansea City (1)	St Andrew's, Birmingham
19:45 BST	Burn 57'; Green 61'; Adeyemi 81'	Report	Bony 90+5'	Attendance: 7,470; Referee: Keith Stroud

== Fourth round ==
The draw for the fourth round took place on 25 September 2013 live on Sky Sports. All ties were originally to be played during the week commencing 28 October 2013, but the game between Sunderland and Southampton was later moved to 6 November 2013. Birmingham City, Burnley and Leicester City were the only teams outside of the Premier League left in the competition, all three compete in the Championship.

29 October 2013	Leicester City (2)	4–3	Fulham (1)	King Power Stadium, Leicester
19:45 GMT	Morgan 40'; Wood 45'; Miquel 51'; Dyer 89'	Report	Rodallega 18', 52'; Karagounis 87'	Attendance: 17,932; Referee: Keith Stroud

29 October 2013	Birmingham City (2)	4–4 (a.e.t.) (2–4 p)	Stoke City (1)	St Andrew's, Birmingham
19:45 GMT	Adeyemi 28'; Løvenkrands 85', 90+2'; Lee 118'	Report	Assaidi 10'; Crouch 55'; Arnautović 71'; Jones 93'	Attendance: 13,436; Referee: Simon Hooper
	Penalties
	Hancox (penalty missed); Løvenkrands (penalty scored); Reilly (penalty missed); Lee (penalty scored)		(penalty scored) Jones; (penalty scored) Shawcross; (penalty scored) Muniesa; (penalty scored) Nzonzi

29 October 2013	Manchester United (1)	4–0	Norwich City (1)	Old Trafford, Manchester
19:45 GMT	Hernández 21' (pen.), 53'; Jones 87'; Fábio 90+4'	Report		Attendance: 58,663; Referee: Kevin Friend

29 October 2013	Burnley (2)	0–2	West Ham United (1)	Turf Moor, Burnley
19:45 GMT		Report	Taylor 76' (pen.); Collison 90+4' (pen.)	Attendance: 14,376; Referee: Robert Madley

29 October 2013	Arsenal (1)	0–2	Chelsea (1)	Emirates Stadium, Holloway, London
19:45 GMT		Report	Azpilicueta 26'; Mata 66'	Attendance: 59,455; Referee: Phil Dowd

30 October 2013	Tottenham Hotspur (1)	2–2 (a.e.t.) (8–7 p)	Hull City (1)	White Hart Lane, Tottenham, London
19:45 GMT	Sigurðsson 15'; Kane 108'	Report	Friedel 53' (o.g.); McShane 99'	Attendance: 35,617; Referee: Jon Moss
	Penalties
	Sigurðsson (penalty scored); Defoe (penalty scored); Vertonghen (penalty scored); Lamela (penalty missed); Kane (penalty scored); Paulinho (penalty scored); Kaboul (penalty scored); Dembélé (penalty scored); Walker (penalty scored)		(penalty missed) McLean; (penalty scored) Quinn; (penalty scored) Boyd; (penalty scored) Gedo; (penalty scored) Proschwitz; (penalty scored) Meyler; (penalty scored) Rosenior; (penalty scored) McShane; (penalty missed) Elmohamady

30 October 2013	Newcastle United (1)	0–2 (a.e.t.)	Manchester City (1)	St. James' Park, Newcastle upon Tyne
19:45 GMT		Report	Negredo 98'; Džeko 105'	Attendance: 33,846; Referee: Neil Swarbrick

6 November 2013	Sunderland (1)	2–1	Southampton (1)	Stadium of Light, Sunderland
19:45 GMT	Bardsley 57'; Larsson 85'	Report	Yoshida 87'	Attendance: 15,966; Referee: Lee Mason

== Quarter-finals ==
The draw for the quarter-finals took place on 30 October 2013. All ties were played during the week commencing 16 December 2013. Leicester City, who compete in the Championship, were the only team outside of the Premier League left in the competition.

17 December 2013	Leicester City (2)	1–3	Manchester City (1)	King Power Stadium, Leicester
19:45 GMT	Dyer 77'	Report	Kolarov 8'; Džeko 41', 53'	Attendance: 31,319; Referee: Roger East

17 December 2013	Sunderland (1)	2–1 (a.e.t.)	Chelsea (1)	Stadium of Light, Sunderland
19:45 GMT	Borini 88'; Ki 119'	Report	Lampard 46'	Attendance: 20,731; Referee: Anthony Taylor

18 December 2013	Stoke City (1)	0–2	Manchester United (1)	Britannia Stadium, Stoke-on-Trent
19:45 GMT		Report	Young 62'; Evra 78'	Attendance: 25,928; Referee: Mark Clattenburg

18 December 2013	Tottenham Hotspur (1)	1–2	West Ham United (1)	White Hart Lane, Tottenham, London
19:45 GMT	Adebayor 67'	Report	Jarvis 80'; Maïga 85'	Attendance: 34,080; Referee: Neil Swarbrick

== Semi-finals ==
The draw for the semi-finals took place on 18 December 2013 after the televised game between Stoke City and Manchester United.

=== First leg ===
7 January 2014	Sunderland (1)	2–1	Manchester United (1)	Stadium of Light, Sunderland
19:45 GMT	Giggs 45+2' (o.g.); Borini 65' (pen.)	Report	Vidić 52'	Attendance: 31,547; Referee: Andre Marriner

8 January 2014	Manchester City (1)	6–0	West Ham United (1)	Etihad Stadium, Manchester
19:45 GMT	Negredo 12', 26', 49'; Touré 41'; Džeko 61', 89'	Report		Attendance: 30,381; Referee: Jon Moss

=== Second leg ===
21 January 2014	West Ham United (1)	0–3 (0–9 agg.)	Manchester City (1)	Boleyn Ground, Upton Park, London
19:45 GMT		Report	Negredo 3', 59'; Agüero 24'	Attendance: 14,390; Referee: Chris Foy

22 January 2014	Manchester United (1)	2–1 (a.e.t.) (3–3 agg.) (1–2 p)	Sunderland (1)	Old Trafford, Manchester
19:45 GMT	Evans 37'; Hernández 120+1'	Report	Bardsley 119'	Attendance: 71,019; Referee: Lee Mason
	Penalties
	Welbeck (penalty missed); D. Fletcher (penalty scored); Januzaj (penalty missed); Jones (penalty missed); Rafael (penalty missed)		(penalty missed) Gardner; (penalty missed) S. Fletcher; (penalty scored) Alonso; (penalty scored) Ki; (penalty missed) Johnson

== Final ==
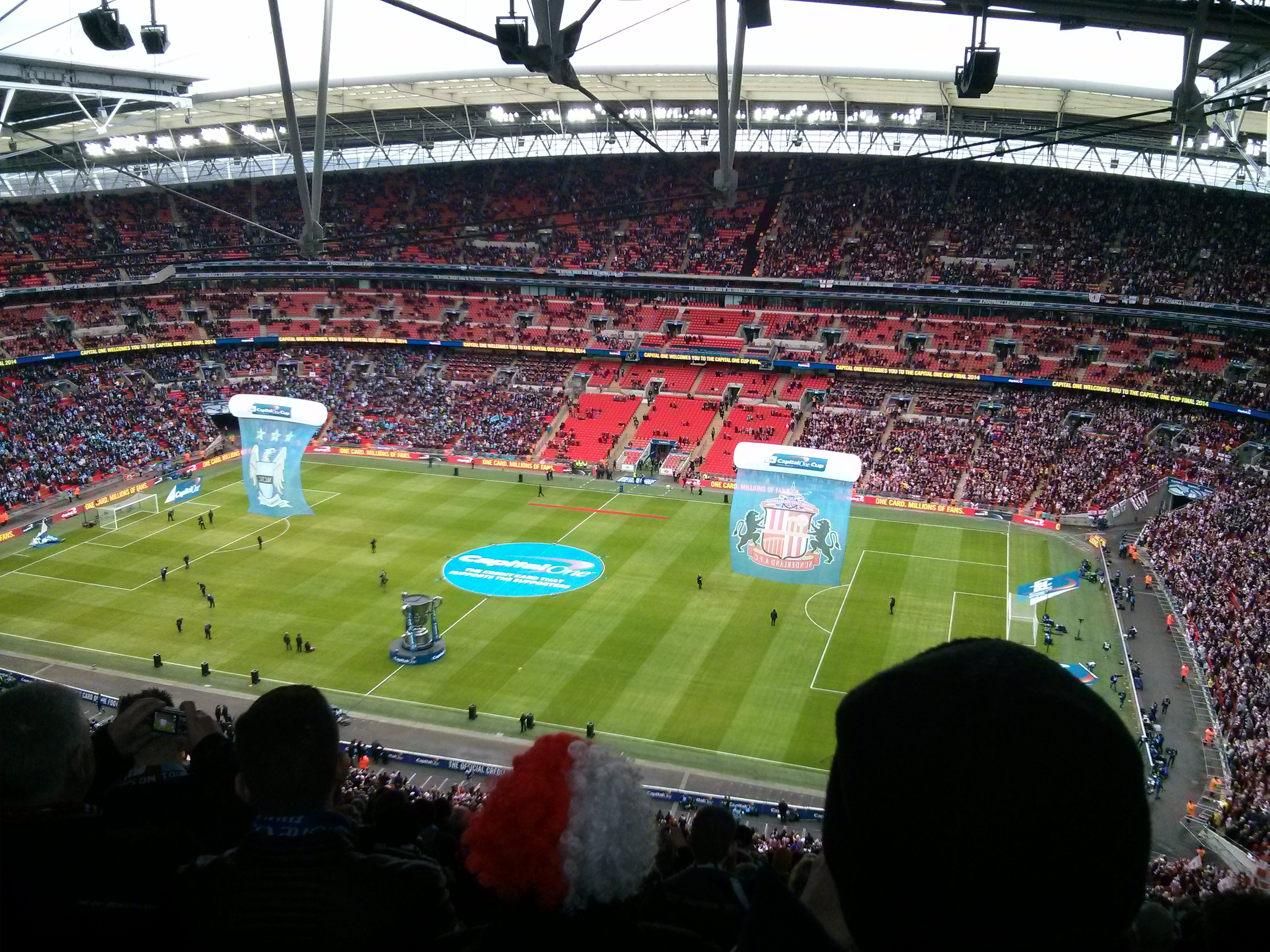
Team banners of the finalists shown before kick-off

2 March 2014
14:00 GMT

Manchester City (1)	3–1	Sunderland (1)
Touré 55'; Nasri 56'; Navas 90'	Report	Borini 10'

Wembley Stadium, London
Attendance: 84,697
Referee: Martin Atkinson (West Riding of Yorkshire)

== Top scorers ==
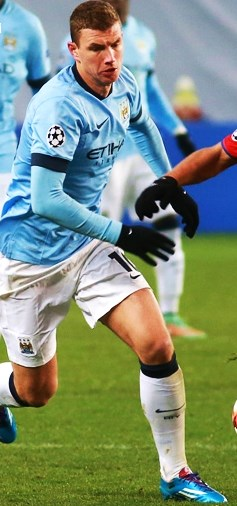
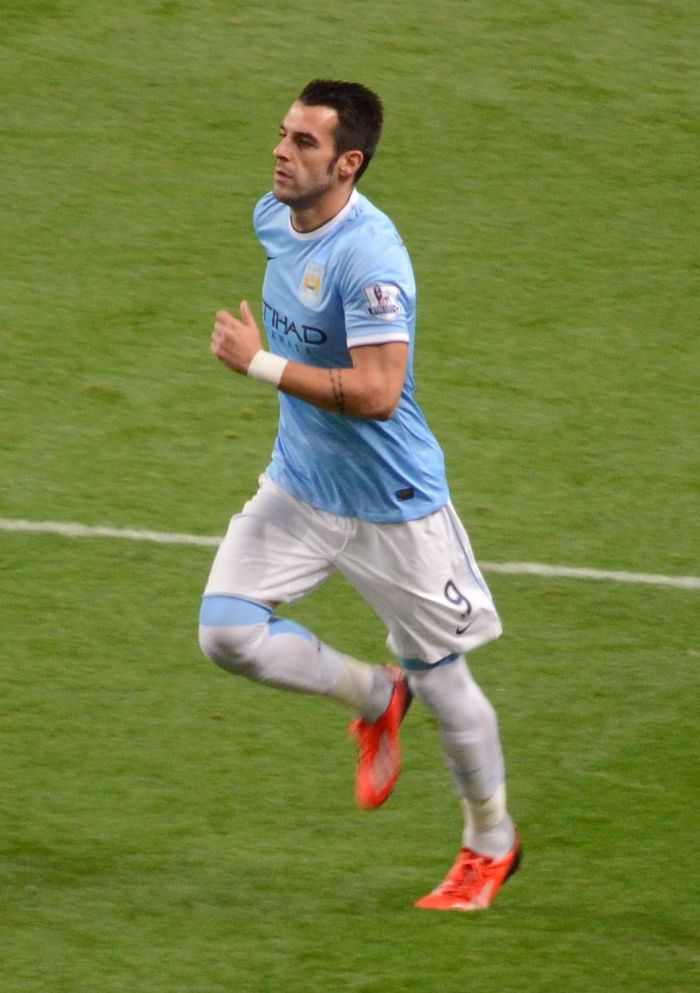
Edin Džeko (left) and Álvaro Negredo, both playing for Manchester City, were joint top goalscorers in the competition with six goals each.

Rank	Player	Club	Goals
1	(Bosnia and Herzegovina) Edin Džeko	Manchester City	6
1	(Spain) Álvaro Negredo	Manchester City	6
3	(England) Lee Tomlin	Peterborough United	5
4	(Burundi) Saido Berahino	West Bromwich Albion	4
4	(England) Danny Ings	Burnley	4
4	(Trinidad and Tobago) Kenwyne Jones	Stoke City	4
4	(Colombia) Hugo Rodallega	Fulham	4
4	(Mexico) Javier Hernández	Manchester United	4
4	(New Zealand) Chris Wood	Leicester City	4
10	(England) David Amoo	Carlisle United	3
10	(Italy) Fabio Borini	Sunderland	3
10	(England) Matt Derbyshire	Nottingham Forest	3
10	(England) Lloyd Dyer	Leicester City	3
10	(Scotland) Chris Martin	Derby County	3
10	(Ivory Coast) Yaya Touré	Manchester City	3

== Broadcasting rights ==
The domestic broadcasting rights for the competition were held by the subscription channel Sky Sports, who have held rights to the competition since 1996–97. During this season Sky had exclusive live broadcasting rights.

These matches were broadcast live by Sky Sports on television:

Round	Live TV games
First round	Preston North End vs Blackpool, Morecambe vs Wolverhampton Wanderers
Second round	Liverpool vs Notts County, Morecambe vs Newcastle United
Third round	Swindon Town vs Chelsea, Manchester United vs Liverpool
Fourth round	Arsenal vs Chelsea, Newcastle United vs Manchester City
Quarter-finals	Sunderland vs Chelsea, Stoke City vs Manchester United
Semi-finals (both legs)	All Matches
Final	Manchester City vs Sunderland
