= Jessy Reindorf =

Footballer (born 1991)

Personal information
- Full name: Jessy Yapo Reindorf
- Date of birth: 10 July 1991 (age 35)
- Place of birth: Paris, France
- Height: 1.96 m (6 ft 5 in)
- Position: Forward

Senior career*
Years	Team	Apps	(Gls)
2010–2011	Comacchio Lidi		
2011–2012	CA Paris-Charenton		
2012–2013	Union Royale Namur	24	(14)
2013–2014	Bury	4	(1)
2014	Tamworth	12	(3)
2014–2015	Sutton United	15	(6)
2015	Union Royale Namur		
2015	Speranța Nisporeni	12	(1)
2016–2017	Paris Saint-Germain C		
2017–2018	RRC Waterloo	10	(6)
2018–2019	Royal Albert Quévy-Mons	5	(3)
2020–2022	Brétigny Foot	13	(1)

International career
2013	Rwanda	2	(0)
- * Club domestic league appearances and goals

Jessy Yapo Reindorf (born 10 July 1991) is a former professional footballer who played as a forward. Born in France, he represented Rwanda at international level.

== Club career ==
Born in Paris, France, Reindorf spent his early career in Italy, France and Belgium with Comacchio Lidi, CA Paris-Charenton and Union Royale Namur. While with Comacchio Lidi, Reindorf's contract and transfer arrangements was investigated by the footballing authorities.

He signed a two-year contract with English club Bury in July 2013. Reindorf scored his first goal for Bury on 27 August 2013 in 6–3 defeat to Norwich City in the League Cup; the goal was described by the BBC as a "spectacular strike," and Reindorf's performance was praised by manager Kevin Blackwell.

On 16 January 2014, Reindorf had his contract cancelled at Bury. Later that month he went on trial with Scottish club Falkirk. He signed for Tamworth in February 2014.

Reindorf signed for Sutton United in June 2014.

In January 2015 he returned to Belgium, signing with former club Union Royale Namur. He signed with Moldovan club Speranța Nisporeni for the 2015–16 season. He later played with Paris Saint-Germain C, RRC Waterloo and Royal Albert Quévy-Mons.

== International career ==
Reindorf made his international debut for Rwanda in 2013, in a friendly against Uganda, and he has appeared in FIFA World Cup qualifying matches.

== Career statistics ==
As of 15 December 2015

Appearances and goals by club, season and competition
Club	Season	League		National cup		League cup		Other		Total	
Club	Season	Apps	Goals	Apps	Goals	Apps	Goals	Apps	Goals	Apps	Goals
Union Royale Namur	2012–13	24	14	0	0	0	0	1	1	25	15
Bury	2013–14	4	1	0	0	1	1	0	0	5	2
Tamworth	2013–14	12	3	0	0	0	0	0	0	12	3
Sutton United	2014–15	15	6	0	0	0	0	0	0	15	6
Speranța Nisporeni	2015–16	12	1	0	0	0	0	0	0	12	1
Career total		67	25	0	0	1	1	1	1	69	27
