= Anton Forrester =

English footballer (born 1994)

Personal information
- Full name: Anton George Forrester
- Date of birth: 11 February 1994 (age 32)
- Place of birth: Liverpool, England
- Height: 1.83 m (6 ft 0 in)
- Position: Forward

Youth career
- 2003–2012: Everton

Senior career*
Years	Team	Apps	(Gls)
2013–2016	Blackburn Rovers	0	(0)
2013–2014	→ Bury (loan)	28	(6)
2015	→ Morecambe (loan)	3	(0)
2016–2018	Port Vale	34	(4)
2019–2020	Radcliffe	12	(2)
Total		77	(12)
- * Club domestic league appearances and goals

Anton George Forrester (born 11 February 1994) is an English former professional footballer who played as a forward.

A former Everton youth team player, he was signed to Blackburn Rovers in January 2013. He spent the 2013–14 season on loan at Bury, where he scored seven goals in 30 appearances. He suffered a serious knee injury in March 2014, which left him sidelined for nine months. He joined Morecambe on loan in November 2015 and signed with Port Vale in July 2016 after being released by Blackburn. He was released by Port Vale in May 2018 and signed with Radcliffe in August 2019.

== Club career ==
=== Blackburn Rovers ===
Forrester was born in Liverpool and attended the Everton Academy from the age of nine. He joined Blackburn Rovers after a trial spell in January 2013, and signed a two-year contract after impressing manager Michael Appleton and reserve team manager Gary Bowyer. He made his debut in the FA Cup on 13 March, coming on as a 75th-minute substitute for Joshua King in a 1–0 defeat to Millwall at Ewood Park.

In July 2013, Forrester joined Bury of League Two on loan until 1 January 2014. He made his debut for the "Shakers" in the opening game of the 2013–14 season, where he came on as a substitute for Ashley Grimes 60 minutes into a 2–0 defeat to Chesterfield at Gigg Lane. On 17 August, he scored his first goal in the Football League, in a 3–0 home win over Accrington Stanley. He then scored in the next game seven days later, in a 2–2 draw at Burton Albion. Three days later, he scored again in the second round of the League Cup, in a 6–3 defeat to Norwich City at Carrow Road. The following month he scored two goals in two games against Southend United and Dagenham & Redbridge. After scoring his sixth goal just 43 seconds into a 2–1 win over York City on 29 December, his loan deal was extended until the end of the season. The goal against York was later voted the club's 'Goal of the Season' at the end of season awards dinner. He added a seventh goal to his tally in a 1–0 win over Wycombe Wanderers on 1 February. However, he suffered a knee injury against Fleetwood Town on 11 March, which brought his season to an end.

Forrester was sidelined for nine months before he recovered from his knee injury. He then struggled with minor hamstring injuries for the remainder of the 2014–15 season. He signed a one-year contract with the club in July 2015. He returned to League Two on a one-month loan at Jim Bentley's Morecambe in November 2015. He made two starts and two substitute appearances during his loan spell. Forrester scored six goals in 17 games for Blackburn Reserves in the 2015–16 season. He was released by new manager Paul Lambert in May 2016.

=== Port Vale ===
He signed a two-year contract with EFL League One club Port Vale in July 2016 after impressing manager Bruno Ribeiro in a trial game. He scored the opening goal and provided the assist for the second in a 2–0 victory over Southend United on his home debut on 13 August. He picked up a hamstring injury at the start of September, and then aggravated the same hamstring upon his return to action on 1 October, leaving him with another month-long lay-off. He was again forced off upon his return to action on 22 November, having again aggravated the same hamstring injury. He underwent surgery on his Achilles in April.

He picked up a thigh injury at the start of the 2017–18 season which saw him ruled out of action for three months. He had a meeting with the new manager Neil Aspin in November, who stated that "I can only comment since I have been here, but he has got himself fit and his attitude has been fine." He marked his return to action in November with two goals in three appearances, including the equalising goal at Newport County. However, injuries and a lack of confidence restricted his first-team opportunities, leading Aspin to state that "he is a player who possesses a lot of good attributes but it is a case of who can get those attributes out of Anton and can he do it himself?" He was released upon the expiry of his contract in May 2018.

=== Later career ===
Forrester joined Sunderland on trial in July 2018. Having gone the 2018–19 season without a club, he joined Jon Macken's Radcliffe of the Northern Premier League Premier Division on 23 August 2019. As a result of the COVID-19 pandemic, this season's competition was formally abandoned on 26 March 2020, with all results from the season being expunged, and no promotion or relegation taking place to, from, or within the competition.

== International career ==
In March 2015, Forrester was called up for the England under-19 team but did not play due to injury.

== Style of play ==
Forrestor is a forward who can hold the ball up well and bring others into play. He is strong and aggressive with a good first touch.

== Personal life ==
His elder brother Carl (born 1992), played in the youth teams at Tranmere Rovers and Liverpool, and in the senior teams for non-League sides Southport and Leigh Genesis.

== Career statistics ==
Appearances and goals by club, season and competition
Club	Season	League			FA Cup		EFL Cup		Other		Total	
Club	Season	Division	Apps	Goals	Apps	Goals	Apps	Goals	Apps	Goals	Apps	Goals
Blackburn Rovers	2012–13	Championship	0	0	1	0	0	0	—		1	0
Blackburn Rovers	2013–14	Championship	0	0	0	0	0	0	—		0	0
Blackburn Rovers	2014–15	Championship	0	0	0	0	0	0	—		0	0
Blackburn Rovers	2015–16	Championship	0	0	0	0	0	0	—		0	0
Blackburn Rovers	Total		0	0	1	0	0	0	0	0	1	0
Bury (loan)	2013–14	League Two	28	6	1	0	1	1	0	0	30	7
Morecambe (loan)	2015–16	League Two	3	0	—		—		1 (Note: Appearance(s) in the Football League Trophy / EFL Trophy.)	0	4	0
Port Vale	2016–17	EFL League One	21	2	1	0	1	0	1	0	24	2
Port Vale	2017–18	EFL League Two	13	2	2	0	1	0	1	1	17	3
Port Vale	Total		34	4	3	0	2	0	2	1	41	5
Radcliffe	2019–20	Northern Premier League; Premier Division	12	2	1	0	1	0	0	0	14	2
Career total			77	12	6	0	4	1	3	1	90	14
