= 2003 Football Conference play-off final =

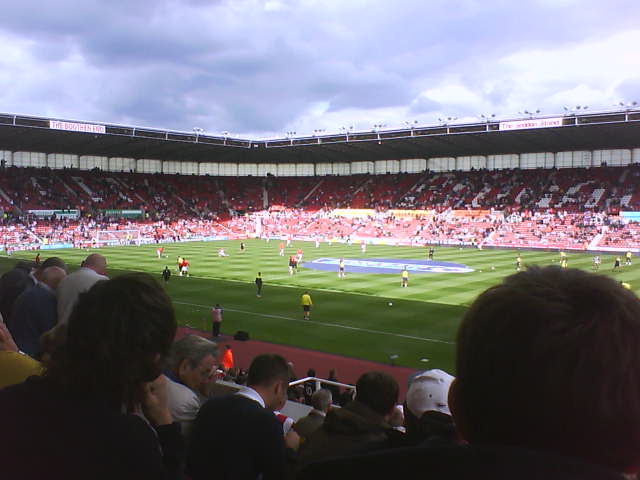
- Britannia Stadium venue of the 2003 Football Conference play-off final
- Event: 2002–03 Football Conference
Dagenham & Redbridge	Doncaster Rovers
2	3
- After extra time
- Date: 10 May 2003
- Venue: Britannia Stadium, Stoke-on-Trent
- Referee: Andre Marriner (Birmingham)
- Attendance: 13,092

The 2003 Football Conference play-off final took place on 10 May 2003 and was contested between Dagenham & Redbridge and Doncaster Rovers. It was held at the Britannia Stadium, Stoke-on-Trent and was the inaugural final of the Football Conference playoffs which were introduced to accommodate a second promotion place to the Football League.

== Match ==
=== Summary ===
Doncaster had much of the play early on in the match with Tony Roberts in the Daggers goal making a number of good saves, notably from Paul Barnes. Doncaster turned up the pressure and should have taken the lead through Steve Foster, whose header was cleared off the line by John McGrath. However they took a deserved lead when Tim Ryan's cross was headed into the net by Paul Green.

Ten minutes into the second half Doncaster were two goals in front thanks to Dave Morley's header, which a Dagenham defender got an inadvertent hand to, with the ball rebounding in off the post. Dagenham battled on and got a goal back through Mark Stein, who netted after a knock down from target man Steve West. They then levelled the scores when Tarkan Mustafa scored arguably the goal of the game. He received a good ball from Paul Terry on the right, ran at the Rovers defence and shot past Andy Warrington into the far corner of the net.

Extra time was needed and, with legs tiring, it was Doncaster who got the golden goal. Paul Barnes broke away on the left and crossed for Francis Tierney, who sidefooted home to send his team back into the Football League. It is the only time in UK football that promotion has been decided by the controversial golden goal method, officially known as "Promotion Goal" in this match. The pitch was subsequently invaded by Doncaster Rovers fans, including one wearing an oversized jester's hat who managed to circle the ground before being caught by police.

=== Details ===
10 May 2003
14:30 BST

Dagenham & Redbridge	2–3 (a.e.t.)	Doncaster Rovers
Stein 63'; Mustafa 78'	Report	Green 39'; Morley 55'; Tierney 110'

Britannia Stadium, Stoke-on-Trent
Attendance: 13,092
Referee: Andre Marriner (Birmingham)

GK	1	Tony Roberts
DF	2	Tim Cole
DF	17	Lee Matthews (c)	Booked
DF	19	Tarkan Mustafa
DF	4	Lee Goodwin		(substituted off) 71'
MF	8	Paul Terry		(substituted off) 94'
MF	26	John McGrath		(substituted off) 70'
MF	7	Mark Janney
FW	10	Mark Stein
FW	9	Danny Shipp
FW	15	Steve West
Substitutes:
GK	18	Paul Gothard
DF	3	Ashley Vickers		(substituted in) 71'
DF	5	Mark Smith		(substituted in) 70'
MF	6	Steve Heffer		(substituted in) 94'
MF	14	Danny Hill
Manager:
Garry Hill

GK	1	Andy Warrington
DF	2	Simon Marples
DF	3	Tim Ryan
DF	4	Dave Morley
DF	23	Steve Foster
MF	11	Jamie Paterson		(substituted off) 84'
MF	19	Ricky Ravenhill	Booked
MF	20	Paul Green
MF	7	Francis Tierney
FW	9	Paul Barnes (c)
MF	16	Tristram Whitman		(substituted off) 83'
Substitutes:
GK	13	Stuart Nelson
DF	6	Mark Albrighton
MF	30	Jason Blunt		(substituted in) 84'
MF	5	John Doolan
FW	26	Gregg Blundell		(substituted in) 83'
Manager:
Dave Penney

Match rules:

- 90 minutes.
- 30 minutes of golden-goal extra time if necessary.
- Penalty shoot-out if scores still level.
- Five named substitutes
- Maximum of three substitutions.
