= 2002–03 Football Conference =

Football Conference
- Season: 2002–03
- Champions: Yeovil Town (1st Football Conference title)
- Direct promotion: Yeovil Town
- Promoted through play-offs: Doncaster Rovers
- FA Trophy winners: Burscough (Northern Premier League Premier Division) (1st FA Trophy title)
- Relegated to Level 6: Kettering Town, Nuneaton Borough, Southport
- Matches: 462
- Goals: 1,342 (2.9 per match)
- Top goalscorer: Paul Barnes (Doncaster Rovers), 25
- Biggest home win: Yeovil – Southport 6–0 (5 October 2002)
- Biggest away win: Woking – Morecambe 0–6 (22 February 2003)
- Highest scoring: Burton Albion – Telford 4–7 (8 February 2003)
- Longest winning run: ?
- Longest unbeaten run: ?
- Longest losing run: ?
- Highest attendance: Yeovil Town v Chester City, 8,111 (26 April 2003)
- Lowest attendance: ?
- Average attendance: 1,616 (+ 18% compared with the previous season)

The 2002–03 Football Conference season was the 24th season of the Football Conference.

== Overview ==
This season the number of teams promoted to the Football League Division Three was increased from one to two, and play-offs were introduced to determine the second team to be promoted, along with the Conference champions. The bottom three, as usual, were relegated to either the Northern Premier League, the Southern Premier League or the Isthmian League.

Yeovil Town clinched the league title and won promotion to the Football League Division Three.

Doncaster Rovers also earned promotion to Division Three following their 3–2 play-off win over Dagenham & Redbridge, during extra time with a sudden death goal in the 110th minute.

The regular season began on 17 August 2002, and ended on 26 April 2003.

== Changes since the previous season ==
- Burton Albion (promoted 2001–02)
- Gravesend & Northfleet (promoted 2001–02)
- Halifax Town (relegated from the Football League 2001–02)
- Kettering Town (promoted 2001–02)

== Final league table ==
Pos	Team	Pld	W	D	L	GF	GA	GD	Pts	Promotion or relegation
1	Yeovil Town (C, P)	42	28	11	3	100	37	+63	95	Promotion to the Football League Third Division
2	Morecambe	42	23	9	10	86	42	+44	78	Qualification for the Football Conference play-offs
3	Doncaster Rovers (O, P)	42	22	12	8	73	47	+26	78	Qualification for the Football Conference play-offs
4	Chester City	42	21	12	9	59	31	+28	75	Qualification for the Football Conference play-offs
5	Dagenham & Redbridge	42	21	9	12	71	59	+12	72	Qualification for the Football Conference play-offs
6	Hereford United	42	19	7	16	64	51	+13	64	
7	Scarborough	42	18	10	14	63	54	+9	64	
8	Halifax Town	42	18	10	14	50	51	−1	64	
9	Forest Green Rovers	42	17	8	17	61	62	−1	59	
10	Margate	42	15	11	16	60	66	−6	56	
11	Barnet	42	13	14	15	65	68	−3	53	
12	Stevenage Borough	42	14	10	18	61	55	+6	52	
13	Farnborough Town	42	13	12	17	57	56	+1	51	
14	Northwich Victoria	42	13	12	17	66	72	−6	51	
15	Telford United	42	14	7	21	54	69	−15	49	
16	Burton Albion	42	13	10	19	52	77	−25	49	
17	Gravesend & Northfleet	42	12	12	18	62	73	−11	48	
18	Leigh RMI	42	14	6	22	44	71	−27	48	
19	Woking	42	11	14	17	52	81	−29	47	
20	Nuneaton Borough (R)	42	13	7	22	51	78	−27	46	Relegation to the Southern League Premier Division
21	Southport (R)	42	11	12	19	54	69	−15	45	Relegation to the Northern Premier League Premier Division
22	Kettering Town (R)	42	8	7	27	37	73	−36	31	Relegation to the Isthmian League Premier Division

(C) Champions; (O) Play-off winners; (P) Promoted; (R) Relegated

== Locations ==
Locations of the Football Conference 2002–2003 teams
Locations of the Football Conference London teams 2002–2003

== Results ==
Home \ Away	BAR	BRT	CHE	D&R	DON	FAR	FGR	GRN	HAL	HER	KET	LEI	MAR	MOR	NOR	NUN	SCA	SOU	STB	TEL	WOK	YEO
Barnet		2–2	0–3	2–1	1–2	1–2	2–0	1–4	0–0	2–1	0–2	4–0	0–1	1–1	3–4	2–1	3–0	3–1	0–2	3–0	0–0	2–1
Burton Albion	0–3		2–0	0–0	1–2	2–0	2–3	1–1	2–2	2–0	2–0	0–1	0–1	1–4	1–1	1–0	1–1	1–0	1–2	4–7	0–2	1–1
Chester City	1–1	2–1		5–2	1–0	0–2	0–1	1–1	2–0	0–1	0–0	2–1	5–0	2–1	2–3	1–2	0–0	2–0	2–0	4–1	2–2	2–2
Dagenham & Redbridge	5–1	1–2	1–0		3–3	1–0	3–1	4–0	0–0	1–0	3–1	3–1	3–0	1–1	2–0	1–2	1–0	0–3	3–2	1–1	1–1	0–4
Doncaster Rovers	2–1	1–0	0–0	5–1		1–0	1–0	4–1	0–0	1–0	3–1	3–1	3–0	1–1	2–0	1–2	1–0	0–3	3–2	1–1	1–1	0–4
Farnborough Town	2–2	5–1	1–2	1–0	0–0		0–3	1–1	3–0	2–2	0–1	1–0	4–1	2–3	3–2	0–2	1–1	2–1	0–1	2–2	5–0	2–4
Forest Green Rovers	4–4	2–0	0–2	5–2	1–2	3–1		2–1	0–2	1–3	1–0	4–1	4–1	1–0	1–0	6–1	0–0	0–2	0–3	1–1	3–2	2–1
Gravesend & Northfleet	2–2	3–2	0–1	1–2	2–2	0–0	1–1		1–0	3–0	0–2	1–3	1–2	3–2	1–1	4–1	5–2	1–3	2–1	0–2	4–2	2–4
Halifax Town	2–4	0–1	0–0	3–3	2–1	1–0	1–1	2–1		1–0	4–0	1–0	2–2	1–0	0–5	3–1	2–1	3–4	1–0	2–0	1–1	2–3
Hereford United	4–0	4–0	0–0	2–1	2–4	2–1	1–1	3–0	1–1		2–0	0–1	2–3	1–2	1–2	2–1	0–1	0–2	2–2	2–0	5–0	0–0
Kettering Town	1–2	1–2	0–1	1–3	0–2	1–4	2–3	1–1	0–1	2–3		0–1	1–1	3–2	2–2	3–0	1–3	1–0	1–0	2–4	0–3	0–1
Leigh RMI	4–2	4–2	0–4	1–3	0–2	3–2	1–0	0–0	0–2	0–2	2–2		2–0	1–0	1–1	1–1	0–2	1–1	2–1	0–3	1–0	2–4
Margate	2–2	0–0	0–1	0–1	2–1	0–0	3–0	4–2	2–1	0–2	2–2	2–0		1–1	4–4	1–1	3–1	1–0	1–1	1–1	2–1	1–2
Morecambe	1–1	5–0	1–1	2–1	3–0	1–1	4–0	2–0	2–0	3–1	1–0	2–1	3–0		3–1	3–2	3–1	3–0	3–1	1–0	5–0	1–2
Northwich Victoria	1–1	1–3	1–1	0–2	1–2	2–2	2–1	1–2	0–2	2–2	1–2	0–1	1–0	3–2		3–1	0–2	2–1	1–1	2–1	1–3	1–2
Nuneaton Borough	3–2	1–2	1–0	1–3	0–3	0–2	3–2	0–1	2–0	0–3	1–0	0–1	3–2	1–1	1–4		1–1	3–2	3–0	1–0	1–1	1–1
Scarborough	1–1	4–1	0–1	0–1	2–5	1–0	3–0	3–2	0–1	2–1	4–1	2–0	3–2	1–0	4–1	4–1		2–2	1–2	1–4	1–1	2–1
Southport	2–1	2–2	1–3	2–3	0–4	0–0	2–2	1–1	2–0	1–2	0–0	4–2	0–2	2–3	1–1	1–0	1–1		3–2	1–1	5–1	0–1
Stevenage Borough	1–2	0–1	0–1	2–0	2–3	5–0	0–0	1–0	0–1	0–2	2–0	3–1	1–3	1–1	2–2	3–1	1–1	3–0		1–3	1–1	2–2
Telford United	2–1	0–2	0–1	1–2	4–4	0–2	0–1	2–1	1–2	0–1	2–0	1–1	1–0	0–3	1–0	1–2	0–2	2–0	1–3		1–0	0–5
Woking	0–0	2–2	1–0	0–0	2–2	1–1	1–0	2–3	2–1	1–2	2–1	3–0	1–5	0–6	2–3	2–1	2–1	1–1	1–5	3–0		1–1
Yeovil Town	0–0	6–1	1–1	2–2	1–1	2–0	1–0	2–2	3–0	4–0	4–0	3–1	2–1	2–0	2–1	3–2	1–0	6–0	2–1	3–0	4–0	

Updated to match(es) played on unknown. Source: Soccerbase
Legend: Blue = home team win; Yellow = draw; Red = away team win.

== Play-offs ==
The Conference National play-offs determine the second team that will be promoted to the Football League Division Three. The teams placed second through fifth qualify for the play-offs. The semi-finals are played in a two-leg, home and away format, while the final is played as one leg, and this season it was held on 10 May 2003 at Britannia Stadium, Stoke, before a crowd of 13,092.

Semi-finals; 1st leg – 1 May 2003; 2nd leg – 5 May 2003
3rd	Doncaster Rovers (pen.)	1	1	2 (4)
4th	Chester City	1	1	2 (3)
2nd	Morecambe	1	2	3 (2)
5th	Dagenham & Redbridge (pen.)	2	1	3 (3)

Final at Britannia Stadium, Stoke-on-Trent 10 May 2003
3rd	Doncaster Rovers (a.e.t.), golden goal)	3
5th	Dagenham & Redbridge	2

=== Semifinals ===
1 May 2003
1st Leg

Doncaster Rovers	1–1	Chester City
Whitman 90'	Report	McIntyre 37'

Belle Vue, Doncaster
Attendance: 6,857
5 May 2003
2nd Leg

Chester City	1–1 (a.e.t.)	Doncaster Rovers
Hatswell 31'	Report	Barnes 57'
Penalties
Clare (penalty missed); Quayle (penalty scored); Davies (penalty scored); McIntyre (penalty scored); Cameron (penalty missed)	3–4	(penalty missed) Paterson; (penalty scored) Blundell; (penalty scored) Blunt; (penalty scored) Morley; (penalty scored) Ryan

Deva Stadium, Chester
Attendance: 5,702
Referee: Atkinson

Doncaster Rovers win 4–3 on penalties after tying 2–2 on Aggregate.

1 May 2003
1st Leg

Dagenham & Redbridge	2–1	Morecambe
Stein 7', 66' (pen.)	Report	Goodwin 29' (o.g.)

Victoria Road, Dagenham
Attendance: 3,447
5 May 2003
2nd Leg

Morecambe	2–1 (a.e.t.)	Dagenham & Redbridge
West 58' (o.g.); Rigoglioso 86'	Report	Terry 89'
Penalties
McKearney (penalty missed); Murphy (penalty missed); Drummond (penalty missed)	2–3	(penalty scored) Stein; (penalty scored) Shipp; (penalty scored) Mustafa; (penalty missed) Terry; (penalty missed) Matthews

Christie Park, Morecambe
Attendance: 5,405
Referee: Foster

Dagenham & Redbridge win 3–2 on penalties after tying 3–3 on Aggregate.

=== Play-Off Final ===
10 May 2003

Dagenham & Redbridge	2–3 (a.e.t.)	Doncaster Rovers
Stein 63'; Mustafa 78'		Green 39'; Morley 55'; Tierney 110'

Britannia Stadium, Stoke
Attendance: 13,092
Referee: Andre Marriner

== Top scorers in order of league goals ==
Rank	Player	Club	League	Play-offs	FA Cup	FA Trophy	LDV	Total
1	(England) Paul Barnes	Doncaster Rovers	25	1	2	0	0	28
2	(England) Kirk Jackson	Yeovil Town	24	0	1	1	1	27
3	(England) Gregg Blundell	Doncaster Rovers	20	0	0	2	0	22
4	(Ghana) Junior Agogo	Barnet	20	0	0	0	0	20
5	(England) Wayne Curtis	Morecambe	18	0	0	0	0	18
6	(Tunisia) Dino Maamria	Stevenage Borough	17	0	1	0	0	18
=	(Republic of Ireland) Daryl Clare	Chester City	17	0	0	0	0	17
8	(England) Mark Stein	Dagenham & Redbridge	16	3	0	2	0	21
=	(England) Christian Moore	Burton Albion	16	0	2	0	0	18
=	(England) Steve West	Dagenham & Redbridge	16	0	0	1	0	17
=	(England) David Brown	Telford United	16	0	0	1	0	17
12	(England) Neil Grayson	Forest Green Rovers	15	0	0	5	0	20
=	(England) Mark Quayle	Chester City	15	0	1	0	0	16
14	(England) Warren Patmore	Woking	14	0	0	2	0	16
=	(England) Paul Moore	Telford United	14	0	0	1	0	15
16	(Nigeria) Kayode Odejayi	Forest Green Rovers	13	0	1	2	0	16
=	(England) Lee Elam	Morecambe	13	0	1	1	0	15
=	(Wales) Kevin Gall	Yeovil Town	13	0	0	1	0	14
=	(England) Steve Guinan	Hereford United	13	0	0	0	0	13

- Footballtransfers.co.uk contains information on many players on whom there is not yet an article in Wikipedia.
