= 2010 Football League Two play-off final =

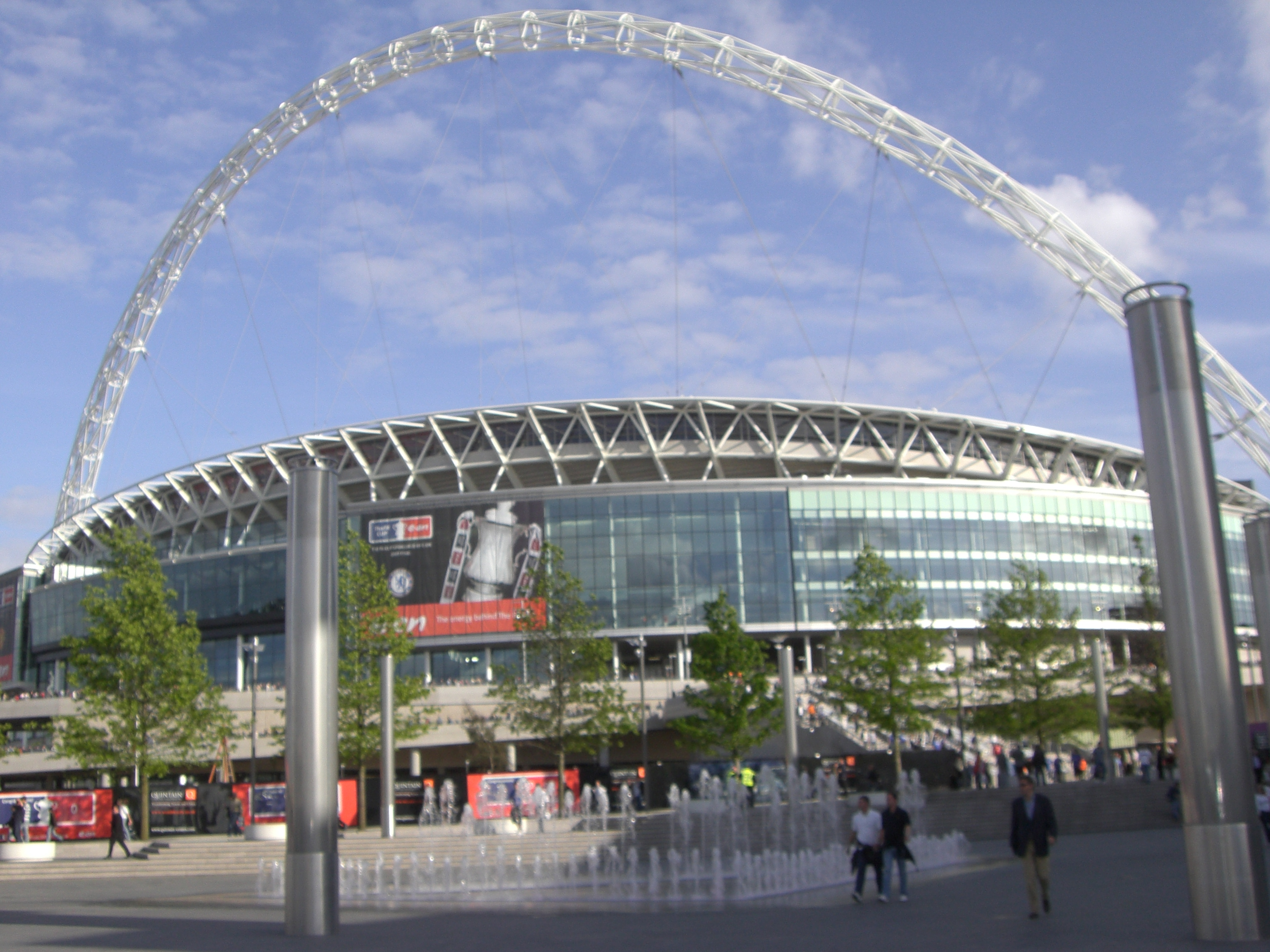
- Wembley Stadium
- Event: 2009–10 Football League Two
Dagenham & Redbridge	Rotherham United
3	2
- Date: 30 May 2010
- Venue: Wembley Stadium, London
- Referee: James Linington
- Attendance: 32,054

The 2010 Football League Two play-off final was an association football match played on 30 May 2010 at Wembley Stadium, London, between Dagenham & Redbridge and Rotherham United. The match determined the fourth and final team to gain promotion from Football League Two, English football's fourth tier, to Football League One. The top three teams of the 2009–10 Football League Two season gained automatic promotion to League One, while the teams placed from fourth to seventh took part in play-off semi-finals; the winners competed for the final place for the 2010–11 season in League One. Rotherham United finished in fifth place while Dagenham & Redbridge ended the season in seventh position. They defeated Aldershot Town and Morecambe, respectively, in the semi-finals.

The final, refereed by James Linington, kicked off around 3 p.m. in front of 32,054 spectators. Both sides had early chances to score but in the 38th minute, a low cross from Damien McCrory found Paul Benson in space who scored with a curling shot into the bottom corner of the Rotherham goal. Within a minute Rotherham's Ryan Taylor ran between two defenders to head past Tony Roberts from a Kevin Ellison cross, making the score 1–1 at half time. Danny Green put Dagenham back into the lead eleven minutes after the restart with a low strike past Andy Warrington in the Rotherham goal. Taylor scored the equaliser in the 61st minute from inside the Dagenham penalty area. With 20 minutes remaining, Rotherham failed to clear a corner and the ball fell to John Nurse whose shot took a deflection off Ellison, past Warrington and into the net to make it 3–2. No further goals were scored and Dagenham were promoted to League One.

Dagenham & Redbridge ended their following season in 21st position in League One and were relegated back to League Two. Rotherham ended the next season in ninth place in League Two, two places below the 2011 play-offs.

== Route to the final ==
Football League Two final table, leading positions
Pos	Team	Pld	W	D	L	GF	GA	GD	Pts
1	Notts County	46	27	12	7	96	31	+65	93
2	Bournemouth	46	25	8	13	61	44	+17	83
3	Rochdale	46	25	7	14	82	48	+34	82
4	Morecambe	46	20	13	13	73	64	+9	73
5	Rotherham United	46	21	10	15	55	52	+3	73
6	Aldershot Town	46	20	12	14	69	56	+13	72
7	Dagenham & Redbridge	46	20	12	14	69	58	+11	72

Rotherham United finished the regular 2009–10 season in fifth place in Football League Two, the fourth tier of the English football league system, two places ahead of Dagenham & Redbridge. Both therefore missed out on the three automatic places for promotion to Football League One and instead took part in the play-offs to determine the fourth promoted team. Rotherham United finished nine points behind Rochdale (who were promoted in third place), ten behind Bournemouth (who were promoted in second place), and twenty behind league winners Notts County. Dagenham & Redbridge ended the season one point behind Rotherham United.

Dagenham & Redbridge's opponents in their play-off semi-final were Morecambe with the first match of the two-legged tie taking place on 16 May 2010 at Victoria Road in Dagenham. Paul Benson scored the opening goal of the game after four minutes for Dagenham after Morecambe's goalkeeper Barry Roche pushed out Josh Scott's header. Scott then scored a 19-minute hat-trick to make it 4–0 with more than half an hour remaining. Benson scored his second and Dagenham's fifth midway through the second half; before Scott scored his fourth three minutes later. The match ended 6–0 and Dagenham became the first team to score more than five goals in the first leg of a league play-off semi-final. The second leg took place four days later at Christie Park in Morecambe. After a goalless first half, Mark Duffy's volley from close range made it 1–0 to Morecambe in the 81st minute before Benson headed in an equaliser four minutes later. One minute into stoppage time Dave Artell's header made the final score 2–1 to Morecambe, but Dagenham progressed to the final with a 7–2 aggregate win.

Rotherham United faced Aldershot Town in their semi-final and the first leg was played on 15 May 2010 at the Recreation Ground in Aldershot. The home side's Marvin Morgan had the best chance of the first half but his shot was saved by the Rotherham goalkeeper Andy Warrington. Midway through the first half, Aldershot's goalkeeper Jamie Young was stretchered off with an injury and replaced by Mikhael Jaimez-Ruiz. With two minutes of the match remaining, Adam Le Fondre intercepted a backpass from Aaron Brown and shot past Jaimez-Ruiz to secure a 1–0 win for the visitors. The second leg of the semi-final was held at the Don Valley Stadium in Sheffield four days later. Ian Sharps hit the Aldershot crossbar, but Le Fondre headed home the rebound from close range to give Rotherham the lead just before half time. Midway through the second half, Kevin Ellison's header from a Nicky Law cross beat Jaimez-Ruiz to make it 2–0 which was the final score. Rotherham won the tie 3–0 on aggregate and qualified for the final.

== Match ==
=== Background ===
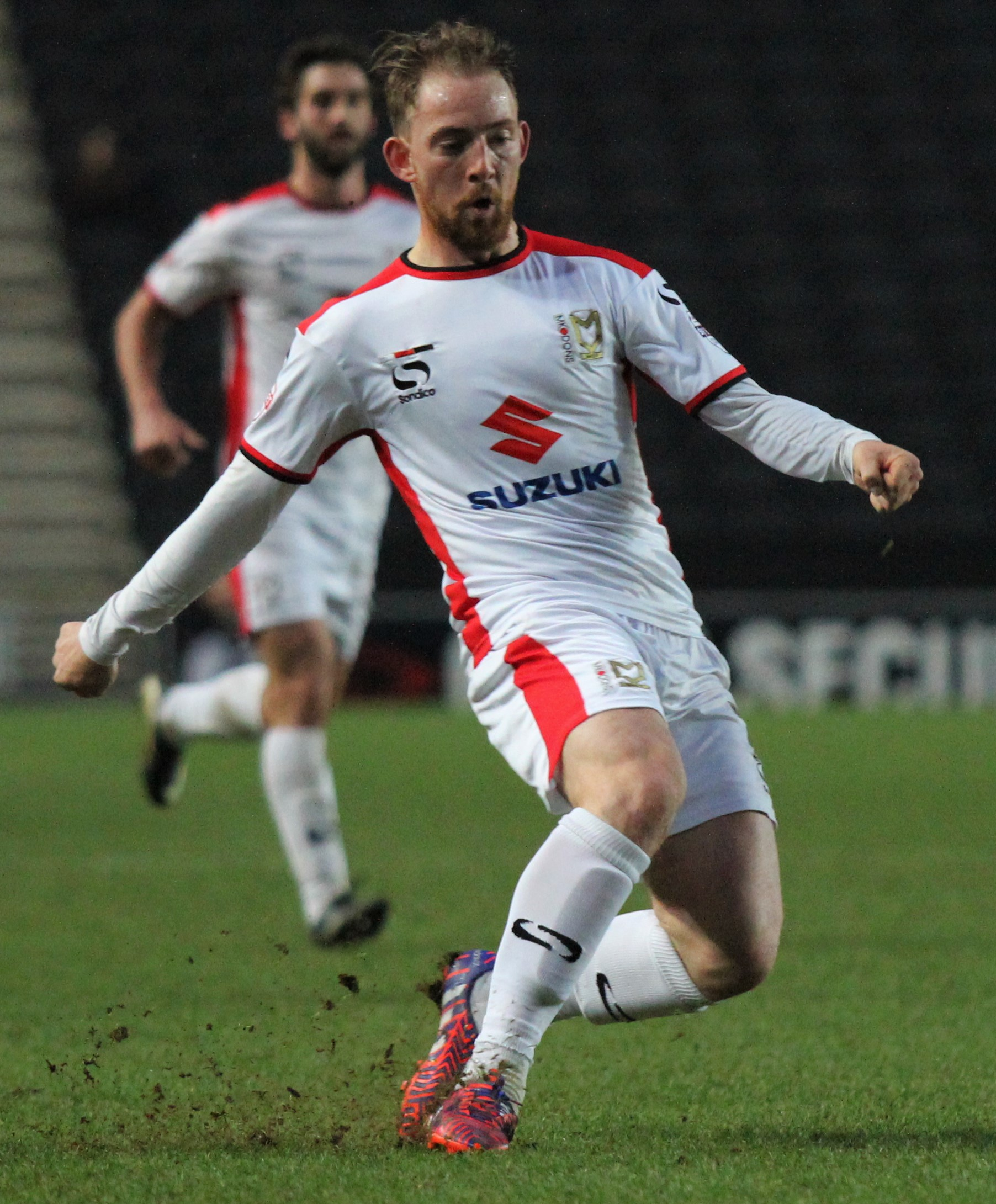
Danny Green (pictured in 2015) scored Dagenham's second goal in the final.

This was Rotherham United's third appearance in the play-offs. They had suffered relegation to the fourth tier of English football when they lost to Swansea City in the semi-finals of the 1988 Football League play-offs, and lost to Leyton Orient in a penalty shootout in the semi-finals of the 1999 play-off. Rotherham had been relegated from League One in the 2006–07 season and had been given a series of points deductions for entering administration on two separate occasions between 2006 and 2008. Dagenham were promoted from non-League football for the first time in their history when they finished top of the 2006–07 Football Conference, and had played in League Two since. They had not participated in the Football League play-offs before, although had played in the 2003 Football Conference play-off final at the Britannia Stadium in Stoke-on-Trent where they lost 3–2 to Doncaster Rovers. Rotherham had won both games between the sides during the regular season with a 2–0 victory at the Don Valley Stadium in February 2010 and a 1–0 win at Victoria Road the following month.

Rotherham's top scorer during the regular season was Le Fondre with 27 goals (25 in the league and 2 in the FA Cup) followed by Ellison with 10 (8 in the league, 1 in the FA Cup and 1 in the League Cup). Dagenham's leading marksmen were Benson with 18 goals (17 in the league, 1 in the FA Cup), Danny Green with 13 (all in the league) and Scott with 11 (10 in the league, 1 in the League Cup).

The final was refereed by James Linington. Rotherham were considered favourites to win by bookmakers. Both sides adopted a 4–4–2 formation, and both starting elevens were unchanged from their semi-final second legs. The match was broadcast live in the UK on Sky Sports.

=== Summary ===
The match kicked off around 3 p.m. on 30 May 2010 at Wembley Stadium in London in front of 32,054 spectators. Dagenham dominated the early stages, with Rotherham's goalkeeper Andy Warrington saving a shot from Green. Rotherham then had chances to score with Pablo Mills missing a header before three separate efforts from Ryan Taylor all failed to produce a goal. In the 30th minute, Romain Vincelot's bicycle kick was saved by Warrington before Sharps received the first yellow card of the match for unsporting behaviour: Warrington kept the resulting free kick from Green out. Three minutes later, Le Fondre was also booked, also for unsporting behaviour. In the 38th minute, a low cross from Damien McCrory found Benson in space who scored with a curling shot into the bottom corner of the Rotherham goal. Rotherham levelled the game within a minute as Taylor ran between two defenders to head past Tony Roberts from an Ellison cross, making the score 1–1 at half time.

Neither side made any changes to their personnel during the interval. Green put Dagenham back into the lead eleven minutes after the restart with a low strike past Warrington and was booked a minute later for a foul on Danny Harrison. In the 60th minute, Harrison shot over the Dagenham crossbar before Taylor scored the equaliser a minute later from inside the Dagenham penalty area, before being booked in the 57th minute for a foul on Danny Harrison. With 20 minutes remaining, Rotherham failed to clear a corner and the ball fell to Jon Nurse whose shot took a deflection off Ellison, past Warrington and into the net to make it 3–2. Two minutes after scoring, Nurse was taken off and substituted for Graeme Montgomery in the first change of the afternoon. Five minutes later Marcus Marshall came on for Mills. On 83 minutes, Scott was replaced by Phil Walsh for Dagenham. Benson's shot from inside the penalty area went wide of the Rotherham goal before Abdulai Bell-Baggie was brought on for Ellison. Vincelot was then shown the yellow card for a foul on Gavin Gunning. The match ended 3–2 and Dagenham were promoted to League One.

=== Details ===
30 May 2010
15:00 BST

Dagenham & Redbridge	3–2	Rotherham United
Benson 38'; Green 56'; Nurse 70'	Report	Taylor 39', 61'

Wembley Stadium, London
Attendance: 32,054
Referee: James Linington

Dagenham & Redbridge	Rotherham United

GK	1	Tony Roberts
DF	4	Scott Doe
DF	6	Mark Arber
MF	33	Peter Gain
DF	3	Damien McCrory
DF	19	Abu Ogogo
MF	20	Romain Vincelot	(yellow card) 87'
MF	7	Danny Green	(yellow card) 57'
MF	9	Jon Nurse		(substituted off) 72'
FW	14	Paul Benson
FW	10	Josh Scott		(substituted off) 83'
Substitutes:
GK	30	Chris Lewington
DF	15	Anwar Uddin
MF	24	Billy Bingham
MF	17	Darren Currie
MF	22	Graeme Montgomery		(substituted on) 72'
MF	26	Tommy Tejan-Sie
FW	31	Phil Walsh		(substituted on) 83'
Manager:
John Still

GK	1	Andy Warrington
DF	14	Mark Lynch
DF	6	Nick Fenton
DF	25	Pablo Mills		(substituted off) 77'
DF	19	Gavin Gunning
MF	5	Ian Sharps	(yellow card) 33'
MF	4	Danny Harrison
MF	15	Kevin Ellison		(substituted off) 86'
MF	10	Nicky Law
FW	39	Adam Le Fondre	(yellow card) 36'
FW	20	Ryan Taylor	(yellow card) 62'
Substitutes:
GK	30	Jamie Annerson
DF	3	Jamie Green
MF	23	Josh Walker
MF	21	Marcus Marshall		(substituted on) 77'
MF	27	Abdulai Bell-Baggie		(substituted on) 86'
MF	16	Paul Warne
FW	22	Drewe Broughton
Manager:
Ronnie Moore

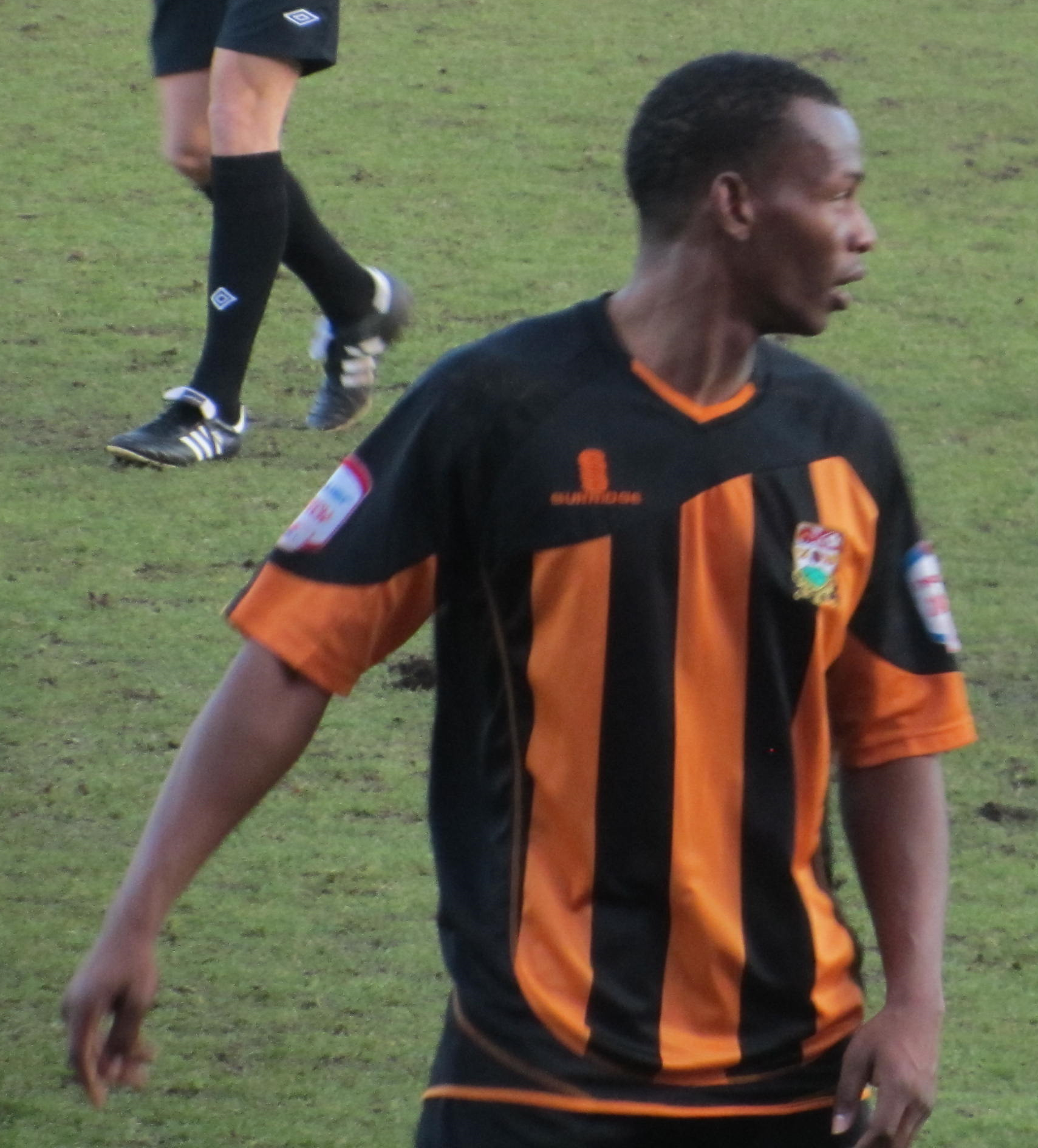
Jon Nurse (pictured in 2013) scored the winning goal.

Statistics
	Dagenham & Redbridge	Rotherham United
Goals	3	2
Total shots	11	12
Shots on target	8	6
Ball possession	48%	52%
Corner kicks	7	5
Fouls committed	15	8
Yellow cards	2	3
Red cards	0	0

== Post-match ==
Winning manager John Still said "We'll probably be the biggest-ever favourites to be relegated but this is a fairy story". His counterpart Ronnie Moore suggested disappointment in his defence, saying that "if you defend like we have you're not going to win ... We should've gone up but we're still here ... We have let ourselves down a bit at the final hour." Roberts, Dagenham's 40-year-old goalkeeper, said: "We are a pub team from Essex but look at us now ... Years ago we were playing Charlton trying to knock them out of the FA Cup as a non-league team, next year we are going to play Charlton in the league, I can't believe it". Dagenham goalscorer Green, who had been signed by Still from sixth-tier Bishop's Stortford of the National League South, described it as the "best day of my life". Despite his two goals, Rotherham's Taylor said he was disappointed: "Scoring twice at Wembley is a great achievement, but we haven't gone up so it doesn't mean anything."

Dagenham & Redbridge ended their following season in 21st position in League One and were relegated back to League Two. Rotherham end the next season in ninth place in League Two, two places below the 2011 play-offs.
