= History of Rushden & Diamonds F.C. =

History of an English football club

Rushden & Diamonds F.C. were a Football Conference club based in Irthlingborough, Northamptonshire, England.

== The merger ==
Rushden & Diamonds were formed on 21 April 1992 by a merger of Rushden Town and Irthlingborough Diamonds. The merger was the brainchild of Max Griggs, the owner of Dr. Martens. The new club took Rushden Town's place in the Midland Division of the Southern League, but played at Irthlingborough's Nene Park as Rushden's Hayden Road was not good enough for promotion (they had been demoted from the Premier Division the previous season due to the state of their ground). The first match was at home to Bilston Town in front of 315 fans and finished 2–2.

== The early years (1992–1996) ==
The club's first few seasons were remarkable for the success the team enjoyed. In the first campaign as a new club under the stewardship of Roger Ashby (1992/93), the Diamonds finished 3rd in the Southern League Midland Division. The following season, before which a new 1,000 all-seater North Stand was opened, the club won the league, securing promotion to the Southern League Premier Division on the final day, after a nervy 3–2 win over Merthyr Tydfil ahead of 4,664. This promotion coincided with another big improvement at Nene Park, with the Diamond Centre and dressing rooms completing the South Stand development, while the construction of the 1,800 capacity Peter De Banke Terrace was also well under way.

The 1994/95 campaign was dominated by a superb run in the FA Trophy, as the club managed to reach the semi-Final stage and a two-legged tie against Woking. Diamonds won the home leg 1–0, but suffered a 2–0 defeat at Kingfield days later to succumb 2–1 on aggregate. Again, it only took two years for the Diamonds to again be promoted as champions, by the small margin of two points over Halesowen Town in 1996. The team had gained promotion to the Football Conference after just four years as a club. With only the east end of the ground undeveloped, the stunning 2,372 seat AirWair Stand was completed, opening in December 1996 to augment the stadium's capacity to 6,572.

== The struggle to reach the Football League ==
Upon promotion to the Football Conference for the 1996/97 season, Brian Talbot replaced Roger Ashby as First Team Coach in the March of that campaign with the club bottom of the table. Talbot had a dramatic effect and managed to steer the club to mid-table safety. He was eventually appointed club manager on a permanent basis before the 1999/00 campaign. The team spent five seasons in total attempting to reach the Football League, finishing 12th in 1996/97, and then 4th, 4th, 2nd behind champions Kidderminster Harriers, and 1st. The stadium development also continued at a frantic pace. In the summer of 1998 executive boxes were added to the back of the North Stand, with new offices and club shop to boot. That same June work began on a roof over the Airwair Stand which was in full use by November.

The Diamonds had big success in the FA Cup within this period. In 1998/99, Forest Green, Leatherhead and Football League side Shrewsbury Town were all dispatched to set up a 2nd Round away clash with Doncaster Rovers. Both teams fought out a cagey goalless draw at Belle Vue to set up a replay at Nene Park, in which the home side triumphed 4–2 against 10-man Donny to progress. The reward was a dream tie at home to Leeds United. A record attendance of 6,431 witnessed a 0–0 draw as Rushden held their illustrious Premier League opponents to secure a replay in Yorkshire. Around 3,000 Diamonds fans made the trip up the M1 in a crowd of over 39,000 at Elland Road. Carl Heggs put Rushden into an 11th-minute lead. However, class told in the end and United eventually ran out 3–1 winners to halt Diamonds' superb Cup run.

The following season the club yet again made it to the 3rd Round, receiving another plum draw, this time away to Sheffield United. Rushden put in a spirited display and a Jon Brady goal was enough to hold the Division One side to a 1–1 draw at Bramall Lane. In the replay the home side held their own against The Blades with the score 0–0 after 90 minutes. United went ahead in extra-time but Diamonds immediately levelled to force the dreaded penalties. At 5–5 in sudden death Brady had his kick saved, and Marcus Bent converted from the spot for United to knock the Conference side out.

The championship-winning season in 2000/01 was Rushden's 8th top-six finish in their nine-year history. The club spent some serious money in pre-season in order to bolster their strike force, as they hoped to clinch the elusive Conference title at last. The huge sum of nearly £300,000 was spent on new players, including Duane Darby, a £100,000 purchase from Notts County and Justin Jackson from Morecambe, for whom £180,000 was paid. Jackson's fee was an unprecedented amount of money paid between two non-league clubs. The brand new Dr. Martens Sports and Exhibition Centre was opened in early summer, containing gymnasium, management offices and recreational facilities amongst other offerings. With promotion being an absolute must, a great start soon tailed off and Diamonds trailed Yeovil Town at Christmas time by a huge margin. However, despite some fans calling for Brian Talbot's head, Max Griggs' faith would be rewarded. A run of just one defeat from the remaining 23 matches saw the deficit clawed back. The club eventually finished six points ahead of their title rivals, securing promotion into Football League Division Three with a 2–1 win at Chester City.

== Football League ==
=== 2001/02 ===
After three near-misses Diamonds finally fulfilled their aim, and won promotion to the Football League as Conference champions in 2001. The first ever Football League match for Rushden & Diamonds ended in a 1–0 victory away to York City. Although the team achieved a 3–2 win at Burnley in the League Cup, they struggled to adapt to their new surroundings and went seven games without a victory. This was put right with a home success versus Cheltenham Town to kick start the campaign, subsequently leading to a 10-match unbeaten run which included four wins. In the LDV Vans Trophy a demolition job by Cardiff City resulted in a 7–1 thumping for Diamonds at Ninian Park, whilst a loss at Brighton & Hove Albion in the FA Cup 2nd Round put paid to any potential run. The club hit a mixed run of form on the approach to and during the Christmas period, though the signing of Onandi Lowe, a Jamaican international striker, proved to be a decisive acquisition. 2002 began with much improvement, as five wins from seven matches indicated a possible push for promotion. A 2–1 defeat to Hull City at Boothferry Park in early February was followed up by three draws and two wins, whilst Luton Town inflicted Rushden's first league defeat at Nene Park since September 2001 on 9 March.

Diamonds found themselves in a great position for a top-seven finish and four emphatic wins in a row put them on the cusp of a Play-Off place. A draw at Scunthorpe United and a defeat at home to Kidderminster Harriers however meant a win was needed on the final day to assure qualification for the play-offs. This was duly delivered with a 4–2 victory away to Halifax Town, as the club finished in sixth spot to set up a Play-Off Semi-Final against Rochdale. In the first leg at Nene Park the away side twice took the lead, but both times Rushden equalised as the match finished 2–2. In a mouth-watering second leg at Spotland, an unfortunate own goal by Tarkan Mustafa on 63 minutes put the hosts on the front foot. But Diamonds immediately responded through Onandi Lowe, and with quarter of an hour to go Paul Hall went through on goal, rounded the keeper, and tucked home for a 2–1 lead (4–3 on aggregate). Rushden held on to secure a famous victory and progress to the Play-Off Final at the Millennium Stadium to play Cheltenham. Over 24,000 saw Martin Devaney put the Robins ahead, quickly cancelled out by a Paul Hall wonder goal. It wasn't to be though as two further goals secured the win for Cheltenham to end Diamonds' promotion hopes after a strong season.

=== 2002/03 ===
After going close the previous campaign, promotion was very high on the agenda as Diamonds looked to go one better in 2002/03. The new term began well with four wins, two draws and a defeat, whilst progress to the League Cup 2nd Round was made as Millwall were beaten at Nene Park 5–3 on penalties AET. Just 10 points were gained in the next eight league games, as the club hit an average run of form. Within this period Rushden suffered their heaviest ever defeat, with an 8–0 loss at the hands of Coventry City in the League Cup, as nine-man Diamonds were annihilated at Highfield Road. The LDV Vans Trophy was exited at the first hurdle with a 4–0 defeat away to Cambridge United. The club responded in style though with six straight league wins to get the promotion push well back on track. In the FA Cup 1st Round a 2–2 draw away to Kidderminster Harriers forced a replay, in which Diamonds won 2–1 to set up a trip to Exeter City in the next stage. A disappointing performance resulted in a 3–1 loss at St James Park, but one which meant they could now 'concentrate on the league'.

Although Rushden finished the year in the top-six, their form slightly tailed off over Christmas and in January, with Oxford United completing a league double over the team as eight games yielded only 12 points. In February and early March Diamonds won two, drew two and lost two and were sitting in an automatic promotion place. The club went on a barnstorming run with victories against Hull, Bury, Exeter City, Bristol Rovers and Lincoln City, alongside draws with Boston United and Rochdale. Diamonds had therefore completely caught up with leaders Hartlepool United who had been choking. Rushden & Diamonds secured their promotion to Division Two at Carlisle United, with a 2–1 win at Brunton Park, a result which sent them top of the league. As their title rivals were held to a draw by Rochdale, a 3–0 win at home to Macclesfield Town meant a success at Leyton Orient would secure top spot. 1,240 Diamonds fans travelled to Brisbane Road in expectancy; however a 0–0 draw ensured a title showdown at Nene Park against Hartlepool on the final day. In front of a plus 6,200 crowd, and needing just a point, the home side went ahead in the first half through Paul Hall. As the game approached its conclusion a late Chris Westwood equaliser made for a nerve-racking finish. But Diamonds managed to hold on for the draw and thus seal the Division Three title in dramatic fashion by two points. The club had incredibly gone from the Southern League Midland Division to Division Two, the third tier of English football, in just 11 years.

=== 2003/04 ===
2003/04 was a difficult season for Rushden and Diamonds. The club's board and supporters were hopeful of another promotion challenge, and some promising results in the early part of the season suggested that this could be achieved. But a run of bad results during the winter saw the club slip down the table and in March 2004 Brian Talbot left the club after seven years as manager to take charge at Oldham Athletic. Barry Hunter, with no previous managerial experience, was appointed as the caretaker player-manager, but with the club needing to offload its top players to balance the books it continued to slide further down the Second Division table and they were relegated in 22nd place after losing their last game of the season.

=== 2004/05 ===
Ernie Tippett was appointed as for the last three games of the 2003/04 season and for the start of the 2004/05 season. Despite bringing in a large number of new players, after a dismal run of results which saw the team the media predicted as promotion contenders fall to 22nd place in League Two, he left the club by mutual consent in January 2005. Barry Hunter became caretaker manager again, and although there were many applicants for the position, he was appointed full-time manager towards the end of the season. The club staved off relegation at the expense of Cambridge United and Kidderminster Harriers, but released several players at the conclusion of the campaign.

=== 2005/06 ===
In Summer 2005, Max Griggs handed over the club and certain assets to a supporters' trust, along with an initial cash pledge. He gave £750,000 to the newly founded supporters trust. "I feel very happy that I'm giving it to the right people", he said. The 2005/06 season itself saw the club perform towards the lower end of the table as expected by the media. Manager Hunter rebuilt the squad in the January transfer window, and at the same time sold youth team products Andy Burgess, David Bell, and John Dempster. However, the club continued to struggle and on 29 April, Rushden were relegated to the Conference after a 2–0 defeat at Boston United, which resulted in manager Barry Hunter being told his contract would not be renewed at the end of the season.

== Conference ==
=== 2006/07 ===
Paul Hart took over as manager on 23 May and during the summer, Hart signed former Gillingham defender Chris Hope, Leo Fortune-West, Glenn Wilson, Paul Watson and Jon Ashton. However, following a poor run of results, Hart left by mutual consent in mid-October, with goalkeeping coach Tony Godden becoming caretaker manager.

Mid- and late-2006 saw a lot of changes at the club. In July Helen Thompson became chairman, in November the club was taken over by former Peterborough United vice-chairman Keith Cousins and in December Graham Westley was appointed as manager, with the aim of getting the club out of the relegation battle and build towards promotion back into the Football League. After a seven-game unbeaten run, which featured five wins and two draws, Graham Westley was relieved of his duties on 24 February 2007 for unknown reasons. Two days later it was announced that former Weymouth manager Garry Hill would be Westley's replacement. Hill's first match, on Saturday 3 March, was a 3–0 win over Exeter City. After this game, the club hit an average run of form, eventually finishing 12th in the table.

=== 2007/08 ===
The club started 2007/08 with mixed fortunes, winning only five games in the opening eighteen, and went into the Christmas break in 17th place. 12 points short of the play-off places and 26 points behind league leaders Aldershot. A mini-revival and an unbeaten run was enjoyed from 29 January to 12 March but that run was ended with a 2–1 loss versus Histon. The season ended with the club in 16th place.

However, while the league campaign was disappointing, the Diamonds performed better in the cup competitions. They reached the 2nd round of the 2007–08 FA Cup with a 5–0 win over Solihull Moors and a 3–1 win over league side Macclesfield Town. However, despite an early goal from Marcus Kelly, a 45-yard strike that was nominated by Match of the Day's Alan Shearer as "goal of the day" the Diamonds lost their second round tie with Bristol Rovers 5–1, in poor conditions. The club became runners up of the Conference League Cup losing out to Aldershot after a thrilling 3–3 draw resulted in a penalty shoot-out and the club were also knocked out of the FA Trophy in the Quarter-Finals.

=== 2008/09 ===
During the summer, Hill brought in a plethora of new faces; including former Lincoln City shot stopper Alan Marriott and former Cambridge midfielder Rob Wolleaston. Hill also brought to the club Dean McDonald, Lee Phillips, Sagi Burton, Jamie McGuiness, Gareth Jelleyman and Daryl Clare from Conference National rivals Burton Albion. Leon Knight was also later brought in, a major coup. On paper, and according to the bookies, Rushden were considered one of the best teams in the league, and were joint-favourites to win the Conference.

However, despite the influx of new players, Garry Hill's side failed to perform. By the end of October the club were in 12th. After losing to Evesham in the FA Cup, on a day the official site described as "one of the darkest" in their history eight players were transfer-listed, including four players brought in during the summer. In early December, Knight was sacked for breach of the club's code of conduct. Chairman Keith Cousins retained the option to keep Knight's registration rendering him unemployed from football, unless another club pays a transfer fee to the Diamonds.

After nearly two years managing the club, manager Garry Hill resigned on Tuesday 10 February 2009 following a 3–0 defeat to Burton Albion, with Justin Edinburgh taking over as caretaker manager. It was announced later that day that goalkeeping coach and former caretaker manager Tony Godden also left the club by mutual consent. Edinburgh's first match in charge was a 9–0 victory over Weymouth F.C. after their opponents fielded their youth team after their first team left, after not being paid.

Following Hill's resignation, the free management position was applied for by over 50 people, including ex-West Ham player Julian Dicks, as well as Rushden legends Duane Darby, Paul Hall and Paul Underwood. Justin Edinburgh, caretaker manager, was given the job until the end of the season. Within the space of a few games, Edinburgh breathed new life in the club as for the first time in years, the team began to play with an air of self-confidence and without fear. As well as a successful start to his RDFC managing career, (earning ten points from a possible fifteen in his first five games), the standard of play and the overall entertainment value rose dramatically, with several players rediscovering performances that some had not brought forth in years. A 1–0 win over rivals Kettering merely heightened this sense of relief and recovery. The season ended with a 3–1 win over already-relegated Woking FC. The result ensured their final position as 11th, their highest finish in a league table since the Division 3 title was won in 2003. The season also ended pleasantly with the knowledge that nearly 1,000 extra people had visited Nene Park that season for league games, seeing a rise in the average league attendance for the first time in years.

=== 2009/10 ===
The middle of 2009 saw Justin Edinburgh start the rebuilding of the squad. With only Curtis Osano as the only surviving player from last summers' squad numbers 1 to 11, and the addition of two loan signings from Nottingham Forest, the new look Rushden side did well in pre-season with a number of victories notably over MK Dons, Peterborough and Blackpool in the ERREA Cup. The season saw Rushden have an indifferent start. The club eventually picked up form however, and were well in the top ten for the majority of the season. Rushden reached the FA Cup Second Round, but lost away to Brighton 3–2 in November. The club finished in fourth place to make the Conference Play Offs. The first leg against Oxford United at Nene Park, ended in a 1–1 draw after a tight encounter, with Mark Byrne scoring for the Diamonds. In the return tie on May Day bank holiday however, a disappointing 2–0 defeat ensued for the Diamonds at the Kassam Stadium, to end their promotion chances. Within the 2009/2010 campaign, Rushden recorded their biggest ever home win 8–0 against Gateshead in front of 1,435 fans.

=== 2010/11 ===
The new campaign would prove to be a thoroughly turbulent one in many respects for the club, and one which would culminate in its demise. A largely solid start to the season ensued with 27 points amassed from the first 16 matches. Then, in the FA Cup 4th Qualifying Round, Diamonds were drawn away to their fierce local rivals Kettering Town. Early goals from Lewwis Spence and Rene Howe (penalty) put the away side in firm control. They were reduced to ten men before the hour mark and although Paul Furlong pulled one back for the Poppies just afterwards, Rushden held on to secure a place in the next round and the local bragging rights. In the First Round Proper, however, a controversial 1–0 defeat against Yeovil Town ended any further progress in the competition. On 1 December Chairman Keith Cousins stepped down from his role and was replaced by Liam Beasant and Gary Calder. But much worse news was to follow in the coming weeks. On 14 December, hours before the FA Trophy tie away at Eastwood Town, the club received the news that their goalkeeper Dale Roberts had died. This understandably rocked everyone connected with the club, with the coroner recording a verdict of suicide days later. Although the beginning of 2011 brought three straight defeats, the club recovered well and found itself in a strong league position come the end of February. However, the 1–1 home draw against Hayes & Yeading United at the start of March heralded a downturn in fortunes as the club's form deteriorated rapidly, with just two wins from the last thirteen matches as the club staggered to a 13th-placed finish.
