= Mark Janney =

English footballer (born 1977)

Personal information
- Full name: Mark Janney
- Date of birth: 2 December 1977 (age 48)
- Place of birth: Romford, England
- Position: Midfielder

Youth career
- 1992–1996: Tottenham Hotspur

Senior career*
Years	Team	Apps	(Gls)
1996–1997	Tottenham Hotspur	0	(0)
1997	→ Brentford (loan)	2	(1)
1997–2005	Dagenham & Redbridge	157	(9)
1999	→ Braintree Town (loan)		
2005	Maldon Town		
2005	Heybridge Swifts	8	(0)
2005–2006	Thurrock	25	(2)
2006–2010	A.F.C. Hornchurch	130	(27)
Total		322	(39)

International career
2001	England C	1	(0)
- * Club domestic league appearances and goals

Mark Janney (born 2 December 1977) is an English former semi-professional footballer who played as a midfielder. Janney began his career in the youth system at Premier League club Tottenham Hotspur and is best remembered for his eight-year spell with Dagenham & Redbridge. He made two Football League appearances during a loan spell at Brentford. Janney won a cap for England C at international level.

== Playing career ==
=== Tottenham Hotspur ===
Growing up in Romford, Janney was signed by Premier League club Tottenham Hotspur as a schoolboy and worked his way through the club's youth system to the reserve team. Though he signed a professional contract in 1996, he failed to make an appearance for the first team and joined Second Division club Brentford in March 1997. His first involvement with the Brentford first team came when he was named as a substitute for a match away to Gillingham on 31 March. With the Bees 1–0 down, captain Jamie Bates suffered an injury after 36 minutes and Janney replaced him to make the first professional appearance of his career. He scored an equaliser with his first touch of the ball in League football and Brentford won the match through a 50th-minute winner from Carl Asaba. Janney started the following game against Shrewsbury Town, but was replaced after 49 minutes by Brian Statham during a 0–0 draw. It proved to be his final appearance for the club.

Janney departed White Hart Lane at the end of the 1996–97 season. In 2001, he remarked that he was devastated after his release from Tottenham Hotspur, saying "when you've got your heart set on something and you're told you're not good enough then obviously it hits you. If I'm honest, I knew I was never going to make it at Tottenham. I was in the youth team with Stephen Carr, Luke Young and Stephen Clemence, but it was very hard to get a game with all the pros there".

=== Dagenham & Redbridge ===
After unsuccessful trials at Football League clubs Colchester United and Southend United, Janney signed for Isthmian League Premier Division club Dagenham & Redbridge in September 1997. A hamstring injury wiped out most of his 1998–99 season. Janney won the first silverware of his career during the 1999–00 season, when the Daggers were promoted to the Conference as Isthmian League Premier Division champions. He made 39 appearances and scored three goals during the 2000–01 season, as the Daggers finished third in their first season in the Conference. Janney was a virtual ever-present during the 2001–02 season, making 41 appearances and scoring two goals.

A fifth-place finish saw the Dagenham qualify for the Conference playoffs in the 2002–03 season, but the club's season ended with a 3–2 extra time golden goal defeat to Doncaster Rovers in the final. Janney made 35 appearances during the 2002–03 season and scored four goals. Dagenham stumbled to a mid-table finish during the 2003–04 season and Janney still made 42 appearances and scored two goals. The 2004–05 season proved to be the last of Janney's Dagenham career, in which he made 28 appearances and scored three goals. He departed the club at the end of the season, having failed to agree a new contract. Janney made nearly 300 appearances during his eight-year Daggers career.

=== 2005–06 season ===
Janney had a brief spell at Isthmian League Premier Division club Maldon Town during the 2005 off-season and made no competitive appearances. He transferred to Isthmian League Premier Division club Heybridge Swifts in August 2005 and made eight league appearances for the club without scoring before departing to join Conference South club Thurrock in October 2005. He departed the club in July 2006, having made 25 league appearances and scored two goals.

=== AFC Hornchurch ===
Janney signed for Isthmian League First Division North club A.F.C. Hornchurch in July 2006, linking up with former Thurrock manager Colin McBride. He won the second and third pieces of silverware of his career during his debut season, as Hornchurch won the 2006–07 Isthmian League First Division North title and the Essex Senior Cup. He also won the 2006–07 FA Cup Golden Boot Award, for scoring eight goals during Hornchurch's run to the third qualifying round. He made 40 appearances and scored 10 goals during the 2006–07 season. In his first season back in the Isthmian League Premier Division, Janney made 36 appearances and scored six goals. He had a consistent 2008–09 season, making 37 league appearances and scoring 9 goals. A ruptured hamstring suffered in February 2010 ended Janney's career. He had made 29 appearances and scored two goals during the 2009–10 season, before suffering the injury. Janney was awarded a testimonial by Hornchurch in September 2012, in which a Hornchurch Legends XI took on a Daggers Legends XI to celebrate Janney's career and long associations with A.F.C. Hornchurch and Dagenham & Redbridge.

== International career ==
Janney won an England C cap in a match against Netherlands Amateurs in March 2001.

== Personal life ==
Janney is a West Ham United supporter.

== Career statistics ==
Appearances and goals by club, season and competition
Club	Season	League			FA Cup		League Cup		Other		Total	
Club	Season	Division	Apps	Goals	Apps	Goals	Apps	Goals	Apps	Goals	Apps	Goals
Brentford (loan)	1996–97	Second Division	2	1	—		—		—		2	1
Dagenham & Redbridge	2000–01	Conference	33	2	5	1	—		1 (Note: Appearance in FA Trophy)	0	39	3
Dagenham & Redbridge	2001–02	Conference	35	1	4	1	—		2 (Note: Appearances in Football League Trophy)	0	41	2
Dagenham & Redbridge	2002–03	Conference	26	2	5	1	—		4 (Note: 3 appearances in Conference play-offs, 1 appearance and 1 goal in Football League Trophy)	1	35	4
Dagenham & Redbridge	2003–04	Conference	38	2	0	0	—		4 (Note: 3 appearances in FA Trophy, 2 appearances in Football League Trophy)	0	42	2
Dagenham & Redbridge	2004–05	Conference	25	2	2	1	—		1	0	28	3
Dagenham & Redbridge	Total		157	9	16	4	—		12	1	185	14
Heybridge Swifts	2005–06	Isthmian League Premier Division	8	0	0	0	—		0	0	8	0
Thurrock	2005–06	Conference South	25	2	—		—		—		25	2
A.F.C. Hornchurch	2006–07	Isthmian League First Division North	39	9	0	0	—		1 (Note: Appearances in Isthmian League Cup)	1	40	10
A.F.C. Hornchurch	2007–08	Isthmian League Premier Division	32	6	0	0	—		2	0	34	6
A.F.C. Hornchurch	2008–09	Isthmian League Premier Division	37	9	0	0	—		0	0	37	9
A.F.C. Hornchurch	2009–10	Isthmian League Premier Division	22	3	1	0	—		6 (Note: 3 appearances in FA Trophy, 3 appearances in Isthmian League Cup)	0	29	2
A.F.C. Hornchurch	Total		130	27	1	0	—		9	1	140	28
Career total			320	39	17	4	—		21	2	358	45

== Honours ==
Dagenham & Redbridge

- Isthmian League Premier Division: 1999–00

A.F.C. Hornchurch

- Isthmian League First Division North: 2006–07
- Essex Senior Cup: 2006–07

Individual

- FA Cup Golden Boot Award: 2006–07
