= Murple =

Murple can refer to:

- Jim Murple Memorial, a ska band from France
- Mabel Murple, a book by author Sheree Fitch
- Murple, an Italian progressive rock band
