= Andy Warrington =

English footballer

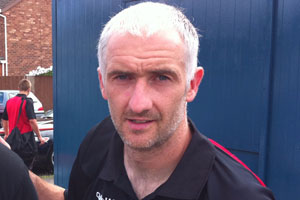
- Warrington in 2010

Personal information
- Full name: Andrew Clifford Warrington
- Date of birth: 10 June 1976 (age 50)
- Place of birth: Sheffield, England
- Position: Goalkeeper

Team information
- Current team: Milton Keynes Dons (goalkeeping coach)

Youth career
- York City

Senior career*
Years	Team	Apps	(Gls)
1994–1999	York City	61	(0)
1999–2007	Doncaster Rovers	196	(0)
2006	→ Bury (loan)	1	(0)
2007	Bury	19	(0)
2007–2013	Rotherham United	205	(0)
2013–2014	Buxton	46	(0)
2015–2018	Grimsby Town	1	(0)
Total		529	(0)
- * Club domestic league appearances and goals

Andrew Clifford Warrington (born 10 June 1976) is an English former professional footballer and goalkeeping coach. He played as a goalkeeper for York City, Doncaster Rovers, Bury, Rotherham United, Buxton and Grimsby Town.

He is currently the goalkeeping coach for EFL League One club Milton Keynes Dons, a position he has previously held at Rotherham United, Grimsby Town, Lincoln City and Derby County.

== Playing career ==
=== York City ===
Warrington's first professional club was York City, whom he joined in 1994 as a YTS trainee. Most notably, he was on the bench when they famously beat Manchester United in a League Cup tie at Old Trafford. An injury to York City's then first choice goalkeeper, Dean Kiely, meant Warrington was required to make his debut for the Minstermen in the return fixture at Bootham Crescent. While York City eventually lost the game 1–3, to a Manchester United team containing Schmeichel, Beckham, Giggs, Scholes, Cole and Cantona amongst others, it was enough to see the Yorkshire side into the next round.

The following season saw Warrington involved again as York City pulled off another League Cup shock with a 3–2 victory over Everton at Bootham Crescent, after the first game at Goodison Park ended in a 1–1 draw.

During the five years he spent with the club he made 61 appearances.

=== Doncaster Rovers ===
In 1999, Warrington joined another Yorkshire club Doncaster Rovers. Arguably, his best days were spent at Rovers, and Warrington was an ever-present in his first season at the club. Then, after breaking his jaw in a game at Southport, the following season, he was forced to spend several months on the sidelines.

He was part of the team that won the 2003 Football Conference Playoff Final held at the Britannia Stadium, after saving two crucial penalty kicks in the shoot-out against Chester City to decide the semi-final. The following year, with Warrington as first choice goalkeeper, Doncaster Rovers went on to win the 2003–04 Third Division title.

On 21 September 2005, during extra time in a League Cup tie against Premier League side Manchester City, Warrington was again seriously injured after a collision with City's Nedum Onuoha. While Rovers went on to win the game, Warrington would never play a competitive game again for the South Yorkshire side. He was a fans' favourite at the club, where he made 196 league appearances during an incredible eight years at Belle Vue.

=== Bury ===
In November 2006, Bury agreed a loan deal for Warrington from Doncaster Rovers, however he only made one league appearance. The following year, in January 2007, Bury then signed him on a permanent basis where he would make a further 19 appearances in the season before moving on from Gigg Lane.

=== Rotherham United ===
In 2007, Rotherham United moved in for Warrington. Within the first two years of his arrival at the club, Warrington had already made 97 appearances, firstly at Millmoor and then at the Don Valley Stadium. Issues off the field at the time, however, meant that Warrington's, and the team's, excellent performances on it were left unrewarded. The club were deducted 10 points during the 2007–08 season and 17 points prior to the start of 2008–09 season, without which playoff qualification would have been achieved.

The culmination of the 2009–10 season, however, saw Warrington and his Rotherham United teammates play at Wembley Stadium, as they narrowly missed out on promotion to League 1, following defeat in the League 2 Playoff Final.

On 26 January 2013, Warrington made his 200th league appearance for Rotherham United against his former team York City at the New York Stadium, as he continued to keep summer signing Scott Shearer out of the team, following his recall earlier in the campaign. During the 2012–13 season, in what proved to be his last with Rotherham United, Andy made 27 league appearances, as The Millers achieved promotion to League 1, finishing in 2nd place in League 2.

On 2 May 2013 Rotherham manager Steve Evans announced the club had decided to release the fans' favourite with immediate effect, describing it as "as tough a decision as I have had to make in my managerial career"

=== Buxton ===
On 27 July 2013, Warrington signed a contract with Northern Premier League outfit Buxton for the 2013–14 season, after featuring for The Bucks during their pre-season fixtures. He began his Northern Premier League career at Silverlands by keeping four clean sheets in his first 10 games.

== Coaching career ==
Warrington completed the UEFA 'B' football coaching licence in 2013.

It was announced in July 2015 that Andy had accepted the role of full-time Goalkeeping Coach at Grimsby Town in the National League. Manager Paul Hurst confirmed on Grimsby's 'Mariners World' on 16 July 2015, that Warrington would also be No 2 while youth Callum Bastock continues his rehabilitation from a knee cruciate ligament injury and deputise for first choice goalkeeper James McKeown. Grimsby having already won a play-off spot; Warrington played in the final game of the 2015–16 season against Tranmere Rovers.

Warrington was a member of the squad that eventually gained promotion with Grimsby's 3–1 victory over Forest Green Rovers in the 2016 National League play-off final at Wembley, seeing Grimsby promoted to League Two after a six-year absence from the Football League. On 21 June 2018 Warrington left Grimsby.

On 10 July 2018 Warrington joined Lincoln City.

In December 2019, Warrington joined Rotherham United as goalkeeping coach. Warrington left Rotherham in September 2022.

On 22 September 2022, Warrington was appointed goalkeeping coach at Derby County, working under head coach Paul Warne, as he did at Rotherham. Warne left Derby in February 2025, however Warrington stayed at the club as goalkeeping coach under new head coach John Eustace. Despite this, Warrington steeped down from his role at the club on 17 February 2025.

On 30 March 2025, Warrington returned to Rotherham United as interim assistant manager, assisting Matt Hamshaw until the end of the season.

On 8 July 2026, Warrington re-united with Paul Warne at Milton Keynes Dons, again taking on the role of goalkeeping coach.

== Honours ==
Doncaster Rovers

- Football League Third Division: 2003–04
- Football Conference play-offs: 2003

Rotherham United

- Football League Two runner-up: 2012–13

Grimsby Town

- National League play-offs: 2016
