= Marples =

Marples is a surname. Notable people with the surname include:

- Brian John Marples FRSNZ (1907–1997), British and New Zealand zoologist
- Chris Marples (born 1964), former English footballer and first-class cricketer
- David R. Marples, Canadian historian, professor at University of Alberta
- Ernest Marples PC (1907–1978), British Conservative politician, Postmaster General and Minister of Transport
- Fred Marples (1885–1945), Canadian sports executive in ice hockey and athletics
- George Marples (1883–1947), English cricketer
- John Marples, multihull sailboat designer who collaborates with Jim Brown
- Molly Marples (1908–1998), New Zealand microbial ecologist & medical mycologist
- Morris Marples (1901–1976), English author and headmaster
- Nigel Marples (born 1985), Canadian soccer player and coach
- Simon Marples (born 1975), English soccer player
- Stan Marples, professional ice hockey player
- William Marples & Sons, English tool-maker

== See also ==
- 7527 Marples, minor planet discovered 1993, diameter 4.4km
- Marples Ridgway, British civil engineering company founded in 1948
- Maples (disambiguation)
- Marple (disambiguation)
