= Hassan Oktay =

Northern Cypriot football manager (born 1973)

Personal information
- Date of birth: 20 October 1973 (age 53)
- Place of birth: Limassol, Cyprus

Youth career
- Years: Team
- Colchester United FC

Managerial career
- 2000–2003: West Ham United FC (youth)
- 2003–2005: Norwich City FC (youth)
- 2005–2006: Watford (youth)
- 2006–2008: Thurrock FC
- 2011–2013: Grays Athletic FC
- 2013–2014: Banbury United FC (assistant)
- 2014–2015: Police Tero FC (technical director)
- 2016–2017: Braintree Town FC (assistant)
- 2018–2019: Gor Mahia FC
- 2021–2023: Township Rollers FC

Hassan Oktay (born 20 October 1973) is a Turkish Cypriot football manager who last managed Township Rollers FC.

== Career ==
As a youth player, Oktay joined the youth academy of English side Colchester United FC. In 2000, he was appointed as a youth manager of English side West Ham United FC. In 2003, he was appointed as a youth manager of English side Norwich City FC. In 2005, he was appointed as a youth manager of English side Watford. In 2006, he was appointed manager of English side Thurrock FC. In 2011, he was appointed manager of English side Grays Athletic FC.

In 2013, he was appointed as an assistant manager of English side Banbury United FC. In 2014, he was appointed technical director of Thai side Police Tero FC. In 2016, he was appointed assistant manager of English side Braintree Town FC. In 2018, he was appointed manager of Kenyan side Gor Mahia FC. He helped the club win the league. In 2021, he was appointed manager of Botswanan side Township Rollers FC.

== Personal life ==
Oktway was born on 20 October 1973 in Limassol, Cyprus. He moved with his family to Kyrenia, Cyprus because of the Turkish invasion of Cyprus in 1974. He has been nicknamed "Crazy Turk". He obtained a UEFA A License. He can understand Arabic. He has been married. He has three sons.
