= Marple =

Marple may refer to:

== Places ==
- Marple, Greater Manchester, a town close to Stockport, in England
  - Marple Bridge, a village within the Metropolitan Borough of Stockport, in Greater Manchester
  - Marple railway station in Marple, Greater Manchester
- Marple Township, Pennsylvania, in the United States

== People ==
- Carole Marple (born 1941), Australian politician
- Dawn Marple (born 1970), American former handball player
- Frederick Marple (1871–1931), English footballer
- George Marple (1868–1932), English businessman and cricketer
- Keith Marple, American politician
- Richard Marple (1931–2019), New Hampshire politician
- Stan Marple, Canadian ice hockey player and coach
- Miss Marple, fictional character created by Agatha Christie

== Television ==
- Agatha Christie's Marple (aka Marple), a British TV series from 2004 to 2013, with Geraldine McEwan and later Julia McKenzie
- Miss Marple (TV series), a British TV series from 1984 to 1992, with Joan Hickson

== Software ==
- MARPLE, software for crop epidemiology

== See also ==
- Marples
- Marpole
- Murple (disambiguation)
