= Tommy Tejan-Sie =

English footballer

Personal information
- Full name: Thomas Malcolm Tejan-Sie
- Date of birth: 23 November 1988 (age 37)
- Place of birth: Camden, England
- Height: 5 ft 6 in (1.68 m)
- Position: Midfielder

Youth career
- 2005–2007: Leicester City

Senior career*
Years	Team	Apps	(Gls)
2007–2011	Dagenham & Redbridge	5	(0)
2007	→ Wingate & Finchley (loan)	1	(0)
2007	→ Billericay Town (loan)	7	(2)
2009	→ Braintree Town (loan)	8	(1)
2011	→ Thurrock (loan)	13	(0)
2013–2021	Wingate & Finchley	203	(15)
- * Club domestic league appearances and goals as of 14:35, 24 March 2024 (UTC)

Thomas Malcolm Tejan-Sie (born 23 November 1988) is an English footballer who plays as a midfielder; he last played for Wingate & Finchley.

== Career ==
Born in Camden, London, Tejan-Sie made his debut for Dagenham & Redbridge in the Football League Trophy, in the 1–0 away win against Peterborough United on 7 October 2008, coming on as a substitute in the 86th minute for Mark Nwokeji. He made his Football League debut against Exeter City in the 2–1 home defeat, on 20 January 2009, coming on as a substitute for Solomon Taiwo in the 79th minute.

At the start of the 2009–10 season, Tejan-Sie was loaned out for a month to Conference South club Braintree Town.

In January 2011, Tejan-Sie went on a month loan to Conference South club Thurrock. The deal later was extended by two further months. In May 2011 Dagenham announced the release of Tejan-Sie at the end of his contract.

He joined Wingate & Finchley in August 2013, making his debut on the opening day of the season in a 4–0 victory over Carshalton Athletic. Tejan-Sie scored his first goal for Wingate & Finchley against Corinthian-Casuals in the London Senior Cup Second Round on 3 December 2013, and scored his first league goal in a 3–1 home victory against Thamesmead Town on 25 January 2014. He remained with the club for a further seven years, featuring regularly during the 2014–15, 2015-16, 2016-17, 2017-18, 2018-19 and 2019-20 seasons, and was ever-present in the abandoned 2020-21 season, but made only seven appearances in the 2021-22 season and departed the club in November 2021.

== Honours ==
Dagenham & Redbridge

- Football League Two play-offs: 2010
