= Phil Walsh (English footballer) =

English footballer

Personal information
- Date of birth: 4 February 1984 (age 42)
- Place of birth: Hartlepool, England
- Height: 6 ft 3 in (1.91 m)
- Positions: Forward; defender

Team information
- Current team: Hemel Hempstead Town

Senior career*
Years	Team	Apps	(Gls)
2003	Clevedon Town		
2003	Taunton Town		
2003–2004	Clevedon Town		
2004–2005	Almondsbury Town		
2005–2008	Bath City	87	(15)
2006	→ Paulton Rovers (loan)		
2006–2007	→ Tiverton Town (loan)		
2008	→ Tiverton Town (loan)		
2008	Newport County	8	(0)
2008–2009	→ Tiverton Town (loan)		
2009	Tiverton Town		
2009–2010	Dorchester Town	30	(5)
2010–2012	Dagenham & Redbridge	22	(0)
2010	→ Barnet (loan)	9	(3)
2011	→ Cheltenham Town (loan)	4	(0)
2012	→ Hayes & Yeading United (loan)	17	(0)
2012–2014	Ebbsfleet United	35	(5)
2014–2015	Bath City	37	(1)
2015–2016	Leatherhead		
2016–2017	Chelmsford City	13	(0)
2017	Bishop's Stortford	10	(1)
2017	→ Welling United (loan)	6	(0)
2017	Hemel Hempstead Town	11	(1)
- * Club domestic league appearances and goals

Phillip Andrew Walsh (born 4 February 1984) is an English former professional footballer. His father Alan Walsh was also a professional footballer, making over 400 appearances in the Football League. Walsh was part of the Dagenham and Redbridge team that won promotion at Wembley to reach Football League 1 in the 2009/2010 season.

== Early life ==
Despite being born in Hartlepool, Walsh grew up in Portishead, North Somerset as one of four children, before moving to Turkey when his father Alan Walsh left Bristol City for Beşiktaş in 1989. The family returned to Portishead in 1991, where Walsh attended Gordano School between 1995 and 2000. After leaving school in 2000, Walsh played for Almondsbury Town.

== Career ==
Having begun his career with Almondsbury Town, Walsh returned to the club in 2004 following spells with Clevedon Town and Taunton Town. He moved to Bath City in 2005, after impressing in a pre-season friendly win over Chesham United, where he established himself as a first team regular over a three-year period, as well as spending loan spells at Paulton Rovers and Tiverton Town. In 2008, he joined Newport County scoring one goal in nine appearances, during a 5–4 win over Dorchester Town, before moving to Tiverton Town on loan for the third time in his career, later making the move permanent for an undisclosed fee.

Walsh joined Dorchester Town in March 2009 to join up with former teammate Ashley Vickers, who had taken up a spot as the club's assistant manager. In late 2009, he joined Football League Two side Dagenham & Redbridge on trial, scoring two goals in a reserve fixture against Colchester United, before signing a permanent deal on 5 January 2010 for an undisclosed fee. He made his debut for the club on 6 February 2010 as a substitute in place of Jon Nurse during a 1–0 defeat to Northampton Town. He made a total of 10 league appearances during the remainder of the season, helping the club into the League Two play-offs and reaching the play-off final at Wembley Stadium. Walsh playing a pivotal role in the final. This was a successful appearance, assisting the Daggers over the line in a heated 3-2 final win, taking the Daggers to their highest point in the football league pyramid. https://news.bbc.co.uk/sport1/hi/football/eng_div_3/8701564.stm

Prior to the 2010/2011 League One season Dagenham bolstered their squad in hopes of adjusting to the standard of League One. On 13 August 2010, Walsh joined Barnet on loan as cover for injured striker Steve Kabba. His spell was successful in a struggling side, scoring 3 League goals in 8 appearances. On 6 January 2011 Walsh joined Cheltenham Town on a month's loan. Dagenham were relegated from League one in the 2010/2011 season. Walsh's highlight an appearance away vs Southampton at St Mary's in front of over 20,000 spectators. Playing against Adam Lallana, Alex Oxlaide Chamberlain and Jose Fonte. Walsh joins Hayes & Yeading United on loan in January 2012. In May 2012, Walsh was released by Dagenham due to the expiry of his contract.

Walsh signed for Ebbsfleet United in the summer of 2012, scoring 5 goals from centre back in the National League, included a 30 yard screamer against Forest Green Rovers. FGR.https://www.bbc.co.uk/sport/football/19394683

Walsh rejoined one of his previous clubs, Bath City in February 2014 to be closer to his family in the Somerset area. Helping the club to the FA Trophy Semi-Final and a penalty shootout away from another Wembley Final. Bath unfortunately losing the penalty shootout battle. https://www.bbc.co.uk/sport/football/32088208

On 21 July 2016, Walsh joined National League South side Chelmsford City from Leatherhead after a successful trial at the club.

Walsh signed for Hemel Hempstead Town in June 2017.

Walsh is now a strategic soccer consultant in Los Angeles, combining the Physical/ Technical, Strategic/ Tactical and Spiritual/ Magical/ Emotional elements to player and team development. Notably working with business powerhouse Courtney Reum in his successful attempt to play Professional Football in Portugal. https://www.wsj.com/lifestyle/pro-soccer-rookie-courtney-reum-45-financier-293491cc

== Personal life ==
Walsh is the brother-in-law of American actor Kelsey Grammer, who married his sister, Kayte Walsh, early in February 2011.

== Honours ==
Dagenham & Redbridge

- Football League Two play-offs: 2010
