= Francis Tierney =

English association football player

Personal information
- Date of birth: 10 September 1975 (age 51)
- Place of birth: Liverpool, England
- Height: 5 ft 10 in (1.78 m)
- Position: Midfielder

Youth career
- –1993: Crewe Alexandra

Senior career*
Years	Team	Apps	(Gls)
1993–1998	Crewe Alexandra	87	(10)
1998–2000	Notts County	32	(4)
2000–2001	Exeter	7	(1)
2001–2005	Doncaster Rovers	58	(10)
2005–2006	Northwich	3	(0)
Total		187	(25)
- * Club domestic league appearances and goals

Francis Tierney (born 10 September 1975) is an English retired professional footballer who played most notably for Crewe Alexandra and Doncaster Rovers. Tierney came through the Crewe Alexandra academy system where he was extremely highly rated by Dario Gradi, and the coaching staff. He played as a winger or striker, and was known for his dribbling skills and technique. Tierney played almost 100 times for Crewe in the bottom two divisions, scoring 11 times. He was an important part of the team that won promotion from Third to Second Division in 1994–95, and also played 22 times in the Crewe side that won promotion via the play-offs from Second to First Division in 1996–97.

Tierney attracted a lot of attention from scouts top flight English clubs, and a £750,000 fee was agreed in June 1995 for Tierney to move to Liverpool. The deal fell through at the last minute when Tierney failed a medical. The setback seemed to knock Tierney's confidence, and the next season Tierney suffered a serious cruciate ligament injury, that kept him out of the Crewe team for almost a year. He never looked likely to regain his former form at Gresty Road, and he was only seen at his best intermittently after that.

Tierney then signed played for Doncaster Rovers as a midfielder where he is affectionately known among fans as 'Sir' Francis Tierney for scoring the golden goal in the 2003 Football Conference play-off final against Dagenham & Redbridge at Stoke City's Britannia Stadium.

In his 2005 autobiography, former Liverpool legend Robbie Fowler described Tierney as a "brilliant player...better than most of the other lads in the schoolboys team including myself".

== Honours ==
=== As a player ===
Crewe Alexandra

- Football League Third Division promotion: 1994–95
- Football League Second Division play-offs: 1997

Doncaster Rovers

- Football League Third Division: 2003–04
- Conference National play-offs: 2003
