= Paul Green (footballer, born 1983) =

Association football player

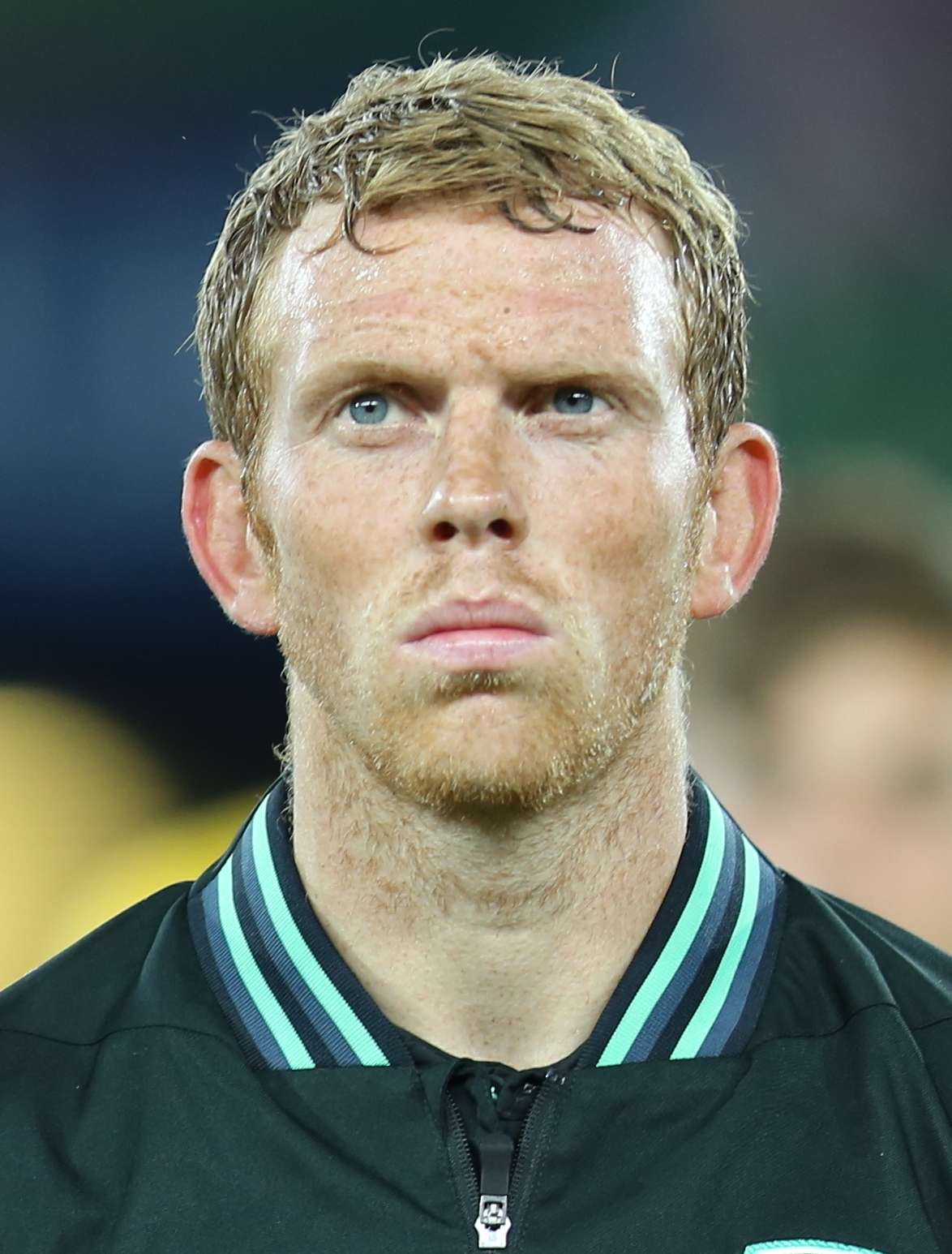
- Green with the Republic of Ireland in 2013

Personal information
- Full name: Paul Jason Green
- Date of birth: 10 April 1983 (age 43)
- Place of birth: Pontefract, England
- Height: 5 ft 9 in (1.75 m)
- Position: Midfielder

Team information
- Current team: Doncaster Rovers (first-team coach)

Youth career
- Sheffield Wednesday
- –2001: Doncaster Rovers

Senior career*
Years	Team	Apps	(Gls)
2001–2008	Doncaster Rovers	236	(30)
2008–2012	Derby County	125	(10)
2012–2014	Leeds United	41	(4)
2014	→ Ipswich Town (loan)	14	(2)
2014–2016	Rotherham United	61	(3)
2016–2018	Oldham Athletic	47	(1)
2018	→ Crewe Alexandra (loan)	20	(1)
2018–2020	Crewe Alexandra	52	(3)
2020–2022	Boston United	29	(3)
2022	Worksop Town	7	(2)
2025-2026	Sun & Anchor	4	(1)
Total		632	(59)

International career
2010–2014	Republic of Ireland	22	(1)

Managerial career
- 2022: Boston United (interim)
- * Club domestic league appearances and goals

Paul Jason Green (born 10 April 1983) is a former professional footballer who played as a midfielder during his playing career. He is currently first-team coach at Doncaster Rovers.

Green spent seven years at Doncaster Rovers, where he played more than 250 matches and earned three promotions in five years (from the non-league to the Football League Championship) as well as winning the Football League Trophy. Green spent four years at Derby before leaving in 2012. A central midfielder, Green can also play as a right winger or as a right-back in emergencies. He has also played for Derby County, Leeds United, Ipswich Town, Rotherham United, Oldham Athletic and Crewe Alexandra

A full Republic of Ireland international, he made his debut in May 2010 and was selected in the UEFA Euro 2012 squad, appearing as a substitute against Spain.

== Club career ==
=== Doncaster Rovers ===
Born in Pontefract, West Yorkshire, Green started his professional career as a trainee with Sheffield Wednesday but was released at the age of 16. Upon his release he joined Doncaster Rovers, and progressed through the youth ranks to the first team, making his debut at 19 in a 2–2 draw with Northwich Victoria in the Conference on 19 March 2002. His first career goal came three days later in a 5–2 home win against Hayes (who have since merged with Yeading). Over the following seasons Green played a key role in several promotions with Doncaster. He first achieved promotion into the Football League following a 3–2 win over Dagenham & Redbridge in the Conference Play-off Final in the 2002–03 season and then won the League Two title the following season. He was again a key player in the side that achieved another play-off promotion, this time from League One into the Championship after a 1–0 win over Leeds United at Wembley in the 2007–08 season. He also won the Football League Trophy whilst with the club in 2006–07.

Green's contract with Doncaster was completed at the end of the 2007–08 season. Despite being offered a new deal, Green opted to leave Doncaster and join fellow Championship side Derby County on a free transfer, where he signed a three-year contract. Prior to his departure he was the last remaining player in the squad from the Doncaster Rovers team that won promotion from non-league football in 2003.

In total, he played 277 games for Doncaster, scoring 33 goals.

=== Derby County ===
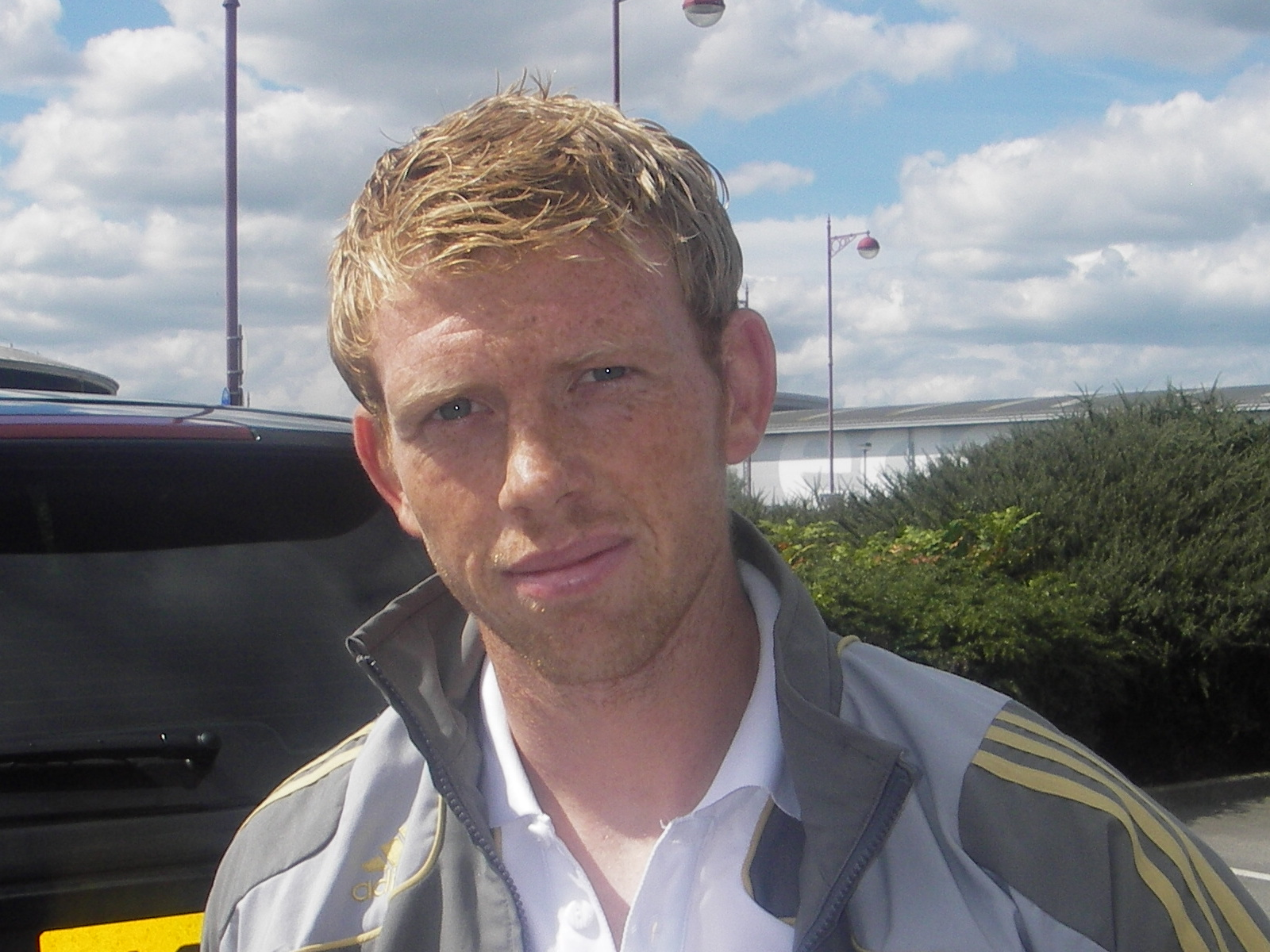
Green with Derby County in 2008

==== 2008–09 season ====
Green made his first appearance in a Derby shirt at home to his former club Doncaster Rovers in a 1–0 defeat on 9 August 2008. He scored his first goal for his new club away at Bristol City in a 1–1 draw on 19 August, and grabbed his second in a 1–0 League Cup win at Preston on 26 August. Green established himself well in the Derby side and was the clubs' only remaining ever-present when he played his fourteenth consecutive game, a 3–2 defeat to Blackpool on 21 October.

He played 40 out of Derby's first 45 fixtures, including both legs of Derby's League Cup semi-final against Manchester United, before breaking his fifth metatarsal whilst sprinting in a training session on 6 March 2009. He was predicted to be out for 6 to 8 weeks, and missed the remainder of the season. He finished the season with six goals in all competitions.

==== 2009–10 season ====
Green began the 2009–10 season well, playing in six of Derby's opening seven games, and scoring in Derby's 3–2 defeat to Scunthorpe United on 15 August 2009. However, he picked up a slight foot injury in the first game of the season, a 2–1 win over Peterborough United on 8 August. He continued to play through the injury with painkilling injections, and had appeared to be recovering. However, his start against Sheffield United on 12 September would prove to be his last appearance for almost two months as his foot injury flared up again. After having another operation on his foot on 18 September, Green was predicted to return to action in four weeks. However, Green suffered a setback in his recovery and his comeback was delayed until 6 November. Following his return, Derby's form improved and he helped The Rams to 8 wins and 5 draws in the next 18 games he played, scoring the equaliser in Derby's 2–1 win over Reading on 28 November. Whilst Derby's form did not hold, winning only 1 of their next 8 games, Green did hold his place in the first team for the remainder of the season, until he pulled a muscle in the warm-up for the penultimate game of the season at Bristol City which cut Green's season slightly short.

He finished the campaign with 2 goals from 37 appearances in all competitions. Green's performance, alongside his first international caps for the Republic of Ireland, attracted the interest of Celtic, though Derby quickly dismissed the rumours, describing Green as "untouchable." He signed a one-year extension to his contract in March 2010, to take him through until the end of the 2011–12 season.

==== 2010–11 season and injury ====
Green started the opening nine league fixtures of Derby's 2010–11 campaign, only missing out in the League Cup due to an international call-up, and scored his first goal of the season in a 5–0 thumping of Crystal Palace on 25 September 2010. Although primarily playing as one of the three advanced midfielders behind a loan forward in Derby's new 4–2–3–1 formation, he moved to right back for a 3–1 victory over Middlesbrough as injuries left Derby short in defence. Despite Derby's inconsistent form, Green was almost an ever-present throughout the season and was linked with moves to the Premier League with Wolverhampton Wanderers and Blackpool

In the January 2011 transfer window, Green remained at Derby and remained a key figure in the side before picking up a cruciate and mediate ligaments injury in a 4–1 defeat at Cardiff City which ruled him out for the subsequent six to nine months.

==== 2011–12 season and return ====
As a result of his injury, Green missed the rest of the 2010–11 season and the first 16 games of the following season, returning to action in a reserve fixture against Sheffield United on 15 November 2011. He was allocated squad number 32 upon his return. Green made his first team return as a late substitute in a 2–0 defeat against Hull City on 19 November 2011, making his first start in a 3–1 defeat at West Ham United on 26 November. Green then became a regular starter, scoring in a 2–1 win at home to West Ham United on 31 December 2011, only missing the 3–2 defeat at Barnsley on 31 January 2012 and the final two games of the season at Portsmouth and home to Peterborough United. Green's contract ended in June 2012 and Derby were keen to extend this deal, with Rams manager Nigel Clough fearing being unable to agree terms with Green. Derby offered Green a new contract in April and gave Green until the end of the month to make a decision. Leeds United were reportedly interested in Green. On 20 April 2012, it was revealed that Green had rejected Derby's contract offer meaning the player would leave the club in the summer.

Derby manager Nigel Clough responded to the news by dropping Green for the matchday squad in the penultimate game against Portsmouth, with 17-year-old academy winger Will Hughes taking his place in the matchday squad. Green's departure was formally announced on 3 May 2012, Green said in an interview that he rejected Derby's contract offer because he thought it was time for a change.

=== Leeds United ===
Upon his return from the Republic of Ireland's Euro 2012 Championship campaign, Green signed a two-year contract with Leeds United on 1 July 2012. Green was allocated the number 7 shirt for the 2012–13 season on 3 August. Green made his competitive début for Leeds in the first game of the season against Shrewsbury Town in the League Cup on 11 August.

Green made his league debut for Leeds on 18 August against Wolverhampton Wanderers but had to be substituted due to a knee injury in the first half. Green returned to the matchday squads against Barnsley and Sheffield Wednesday. His first appearance since injury came as he started on the right of midfield against Charlton, Green was substituted in the second half. Green was subsequently ruled out for two-months with a grade two muscle tear in his knee. As a result of the injury to Green, Leeds signed Michael Tonge on loan to help cover his absence. Green returned from injury and came back into the starting lineup on 23 October against Charlton Athletic.

Green started at right back against Watford on 10 November, however he was substituted before half time when teammate Jason Pearce was sent off for a straight red. Green scored his first ever goal for Leeds on 24 November in Leeds 2–1 victory against Crystal Palace. Green was named as captain for the match against his former club Derby County, and scored a consolation goal in Leeds' 3–1 loss.

On 8 February 2014, Green joined Ipswich Town on a 93-day loan.

On 16 May 2014, Green was released by Leeds United.

=== Rotherham United ===
On 30 June 2014, Green signed a two-year deal with newly promoted Rotherham United.

=== Oldham Athletic ===
On 28 July 2016, Green signed a one-year deal with League One side Oldham Athletic. He scored his first goal for Oldham in a 2–0 win against Peterborough United on 24 January 2017.

=== Crewe Alexandra ===
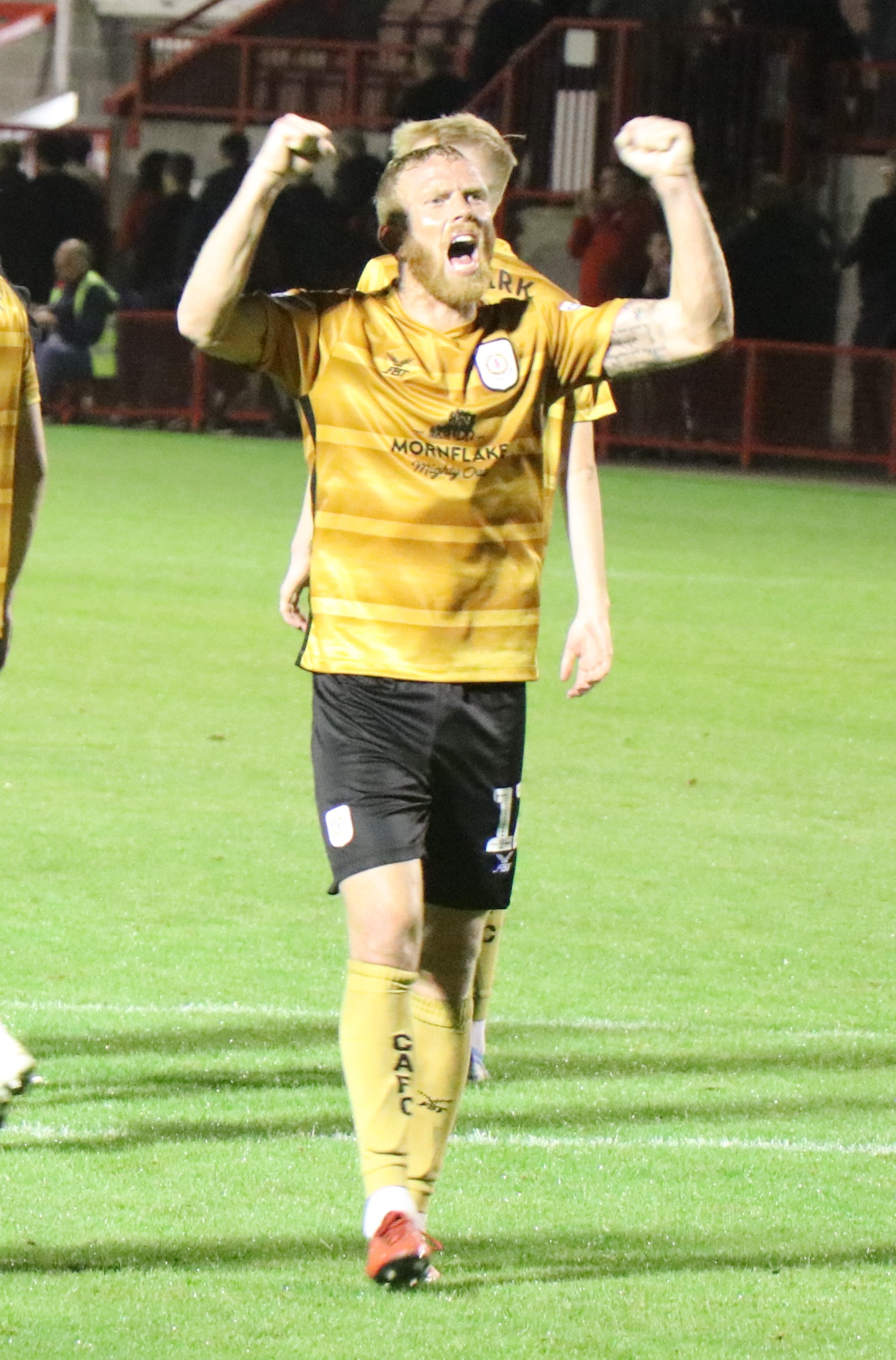
Green with Crewe Alexandra in 2019

On 11 January 2018 Green was signed on loan by Crewe Alexandra in League Two for the rest of the 2017–18 season. He scored his first Crewe goal (a penalty) in a 1–4 win away at Lincoln City on 24 February.

After being released by Oldham, Crewe signed Green on a one-year deal, with an option for a further 12 months, on 10 May 2018. Against Carlisle United on 25 August, Green sustained a leg injury which potentially ruled him out for the rest of the 2018–2019 season. However, he returned to first team action in December 2018, but was substituted in the New Year's Day game at Bury after injuring the same knee. After another return, Green scored his second goal for Crewe, this time from open play, in a 6–1 defeat of Crawley Town at Gresty Road on 16 March 2019. Retained by Crewe for the 2019–2020 season, Green scored the winner in a 2–1 win at Crawley on 20 August 2019. His release by Crewe was announced on 10 June 2020.

=== Boston United ===
Green joined Boston United as a semi-professional in the summer of 2020, he also re-joined Doncaster Rovers as a fitness coach under Richie Wellens. In early January 2022 he was appointed interim manager of Boston after the sacking of Craig Elliott. He left his coaching role at Doncaster following this appointment. On 21 January 2022 Paul Cox was appointed manager of Boston.

=== Worksop Town ===
On 9 June 2022, he dropped down two divisions to sign for Northern Premier League Division One East side Worksop Town.

== International career ==
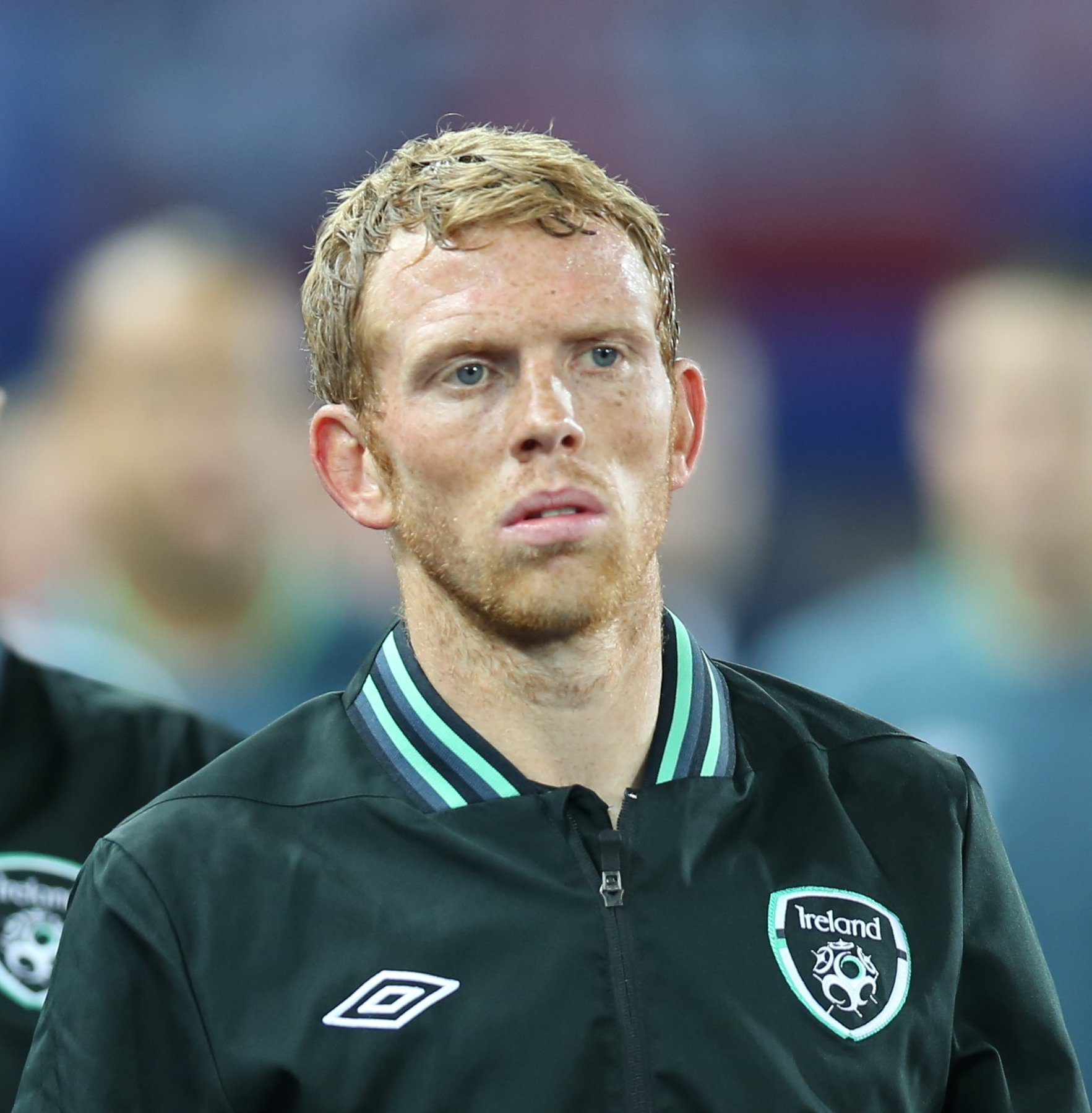
Green with the Republic of Ireland in 2013

Despite being born in England, Green chose to represent the Republic of Ireland at international level. He qualified to play for Ireland through his maternal grandfather, who is from Westport, County Mayo. Green was called up to Giovanni Trapattoni's Irish training camp squad taking place in Malahide, Dublin, in May 2010. He was called up to the full squad for friendlies against Paraguay and Algeria, before playing the full 90 minutes of a Republic of Ireland XI vs Irish amateur match. On 25 May 2010, Green won his first full cap in a 2–1 win against Paraguay at the RDS Arena, coming on in the second half. Three days later he made his first international start, against Algeria, and scored his first international goal in the 32nd minute in a 3–0 win. His first competitive start came in a 1–0 win over Armenia in September 2010. He was a late replacement for the injured Keith Fahey in the UEFA Euro 2012 squad. On 14 June 2012, he appeared as a substitute in the 4–0 defeat by Spain at UEFA Euro 2012.

In March 2013, Republic of Ireland manager Giovanni Trapattoni compared Green to ex-AC Milan midfielder Gennaro Gattuso before a match against Sweden. After the Republic of Ireland ground out a crucial 0–0 draw away to Sweden, Trapattoni proclaimed Green 'is under-estimated by the media' after playing in a defensive midfield position.

== Coaching career ==
On 9 November 2022, Green announced his retirement from football and that he had taken up a coaching role with League Two side Doncaster Rovers.

In May 2026, he was appointed first-team coach with Doncaster Rovers on a permanent basis having held the role on an interim basis the previous season.

== Personal life ==
Green and his wife, Claire, have a daughter, Ruby, who was born on 20 September 2009 and a son, Tommy, who was born on 3 April 2014.

== Career statistics ==
=== Club ===
As of match played 1 November 2022

Appearances and goals by club, season and competition
Club	Season	League			FA Cup		League Cup		Other		Total	
Club	Season	Division	Apps	Goals	Apps	Goals	Apps	Goals	Apps	Goals	Apps	Goals
Doncaster Rovers	2001–02	Football Conference	8	2	0	0	—		0	0	8	2
Doncaster Rovers	2002–03	Football Conference	30	4	0	0	—		7 (Note: Three appearances in Football League Trophy, one appearance and one goal in FA Trophy, three appearances and one goal in Football Conference play-offs)	2	37	6
Doncaster Rovers	2003–04	Third Division	43	8	1	0	1	0	1 (Note: Appearances in Football League Trophy)	0	46	8
Doncaster Rovers	2004–05	League One	42	7	2	0	3	0	0	0	47	7
Doncaster Rovers	2005–06	League One	34	2	3	0	4	1	1	0	42	3
Doncaster Rovers	2006–07	League One	41	2	3	0	3	0	7	0	54	2
Doncaster Rovers	2007–08	League One	38	5	1	0	0	0	6 (Note: Three appearances and one goal in Football League Trophy, three appearances in League One play-offs)	1	45	6
Doncaster Rovers	Total		236	30	10	0	11	1	22	3	279	34
Derby County	2008–09	Championship	29	5	4	2	7	1	—		40	8
Derby County	2009–10	Championship	33	2	4	0	0	0	—		37	2
Derby County	2010–11	Championship	36	2	1	0	0	0	—		37	2
Derby County	2011–12	Championship	27	1	2	0	0	0	—		29	1
Derby County	Total		125	10	11	2	7	1	—		143	13
Leeds United	2012–13	Championship	32	4	2	0	2	0	—		36	4
Leeds United	2013–14	Championship	9	0	0	0	1	0	—		10	0
Leeds United	Total		41	4	2	0	3	0	—		46	4
Ipswich Town (loan)	2013–14	Championship	14	2	0	0	0	0	—		14	2
Rotherham United	2014–15	Championship	37	3	1	0	1	0	—		39	3
Rotherham United	2015–16	Championship	24	0	1	0	1	1	—		26	1
Rotherham United	Total		61	3	2	0	2	1	—		65	4
Oldham Athletic	2016–17	League One	41	1	2	0	2	0	2 (Note: Appearances in the EFL Trophy)	0	47	1
Oldham Athletic	2017–18	League One	6	0	1	0	1	1	1	0	9	1
Oldham Athletic	Total		47	1	3	0	3	1	3	0	56	2
Crewe Alexandra (loan)	2017–18	League Two	20	1	—		—		—		20	1
Crewe Alexandra	2018–19	League Two	26	1	—		—		—		26	1
Crewe Alexandra	2019–20	League Two	26	2	4	1	1	0	2	1	33	4
Crewe Alexandra	Total		52	3	4	1	1	0	2	1	59	5
Boston United	2020–21	National League North	11	1	1	0	—		3 (Note: Appearances in the FA Trophy)	0	15	1
Boston United	2021–22	National League North	18	2	3	0	—		5 (Note: One appearance in the FA Trophy, three in National League North play-offs, one in Lincolnshire Senior Cup)	0	26	2
Boston United	Total		29	3	4	0	—		8	0	41	3
Worksop Town	2022–23	NPL Division One East	7	2	5	2	—		2	0	14	4
Career total			632	59	41	5	27	4	37	4	737	72

=== International ===
As of match played 7 June 2014

International statistics
National team	Year	Apps	Goals
Republic of Ireland	2010	7	1
Republic of Ireland	2011	2	0
Republic of Ireland	2012	4	0
Republic of Ireland	2013	7	0
Republic of Ireland	2014	2	0
Total		22	1

No.	Date	Venue	Opponent	Score	Result	Competition
1	28 May 2010	RDS Arena, Dublin, Ireland	Algeria	1–0	3–0	Friendly

== Honours ==
Doncaster Rovers

- Football League One play-offs: 2008
- Football League Third Division: 2003–04
- Football Conference play-offs: 2003
- Football League Trophy: 2006–07

Republic of Ireland

- Nations Cup: 2011

== See also ==
- List of Republic of Ireland international footballers born outside the Republic of Ireland
