= Tarkan Mustafa =

England footballer (born 1973)

Personal information
- Full name: Tarkan Nain Mustafa
- Date of birth: 28 August 1973 (age 53)
- Place of birth: Islington, London, England
- Positions: Right-back; winger

Youth career
- Norwich City
- Wimbledon

Senior career*
Years	Team	Apps	(Gls)
	Wimbledon	0	(0)
1996–1997	Kettering Town		
1997–1998	Barnet	11	(0)
1998–2000	Kingstonian	39	(3)
2000–2003	Rushden & Diamonds	75	(1)
2002–2003	→ Doncaster Rovers (loan)	5	(1)
2003–2004	Dagenham & Redbridge	52	(2)
2004–2005	Hornchurch	2	(0)
2005–2006	Aldershot Town	20	(0)
2005	→ Billericay Town (loan)	10	(0)
2006	Lewes		
2006	Worthing	13	(0)
2006	Thurrock	11	(0)
2006–2007	Eastleigh	25	(0)
2007–2008	Worthing		
2008	Redbridge	20	(0)
2008	Canvey Island		
2018–	Benfleet	5	(0)
- * Club domestic league appearances and goals

Tarkan Mustafa (born 28 August 1973) is a British former footballer who is a coach at Benfleet. A right-back or winger, he previously played in the Football League for both Barnet and Rushden & Diamonds. He represented the England semi-professional side.

== Career ==
Mustafa was with Norwich City as a schoolboy before joining Wimbledon. He failed to make their first team and was released into non-league football. He joined Kettering Town for the 1996–97 season, leaving to join Barnet at the end of the season. His league debut came on 16 August 1997 when he played as a second-half substitute for Sam Stockley in the 2–1 defeat at home to Exeter City.

He struggled to establish himself at Barnet and was released at the end of the season, joining Kingstonian. In 1999, he scored the winning goal in the FA Trophy final for Kingstonian against Forest Green Rovers. Mustafa joined Rushden & Diamonds in June 2000 and was a regular in the Conference winning side the following season. He remained a regular in the Football League side the following season, but was transfer-listed in November 2002 after losing his place. He had a trial with Coventry City before joining Doncaster Rovers on loan in December 2002. He returned to Rushden after his month on loan, despite Doncaster offering a contract until the end of the 2004–05 season, and in February 2003 joined Dagenham & Redbridge, with his most notable goal coming against his former club Doncaster in a 3–2 defeat in the inaugural Conference Play-off Final.

In May 2004, Mustafa followed Dagenham manager Garry Hill to ambitious Conference South side Hornchurch and was part of the side that looked set to run away with the league the following season. However, in November 2004 Hornchurch were in serious financial trouble after the collapse of their main sponsor and placed their entire squad on the transfer list. Mustafa left and trained with Peterborough United before joining Aldershot Town in January 2005.

He was loaned to Billericay Town in October 2005, and was released by Aldershot in February 2006. He then moved to Lewes before soon joining Worthing, moving to Thurrock in September 2006 and Eastleigh in November 2006.

He was released by Eastleigh in July 2007 and the following month rejoined Worthing.

He has also played for Clapton, Leyton and Redbridge. For Redbridge he was a consistent performer playing an important role in their run to the Isthmian League Division One North Playoff Final against Canvey Island, which Canvey won after a tense shootout. Mustafa later joined Canvey ready for the 2008–09 season.

In the 2018–19 season, Mustafa made five league appearances for Benfleet whilst working at the club as a coach.

== Personal life ==
Mustafa is of Turkish Cypriot origin.

== Honours ==
Individual

- Football Conference Team of the Year: 2002–03
