= Ashley Vickers =

English footballer (born 1972)

Personal information
- Full name: Ashley James Ward Vickers
- Date of birth: 14 June 1972 (age 54)
- Place of birth: Sheffield, Yorkshire, England
- Height: 6 ft 3 in (1.91 m)
- Position: Centre-back

Youth career
- Sheffield United

Senior career*
Years	Team	Apps	(Gls)
- Worcester City
- Malvern Town
- The 61 Club
1997	Heybridge Swifts	115	
1997–1998	Peterborough United	1	(0)
1998–2000	St Albans City	90	(2)
2000–2006	Dagenham & Redbridge	224	(4)
2006–2008	Weymouth	42	(2)
2008	Eastleigh	28	(0)
2008–2009	Newport County	42	(0)
2009–2011	Dorchester Town	51	(2)
2016	Andover Town	4	(1)

Managerial career
- 2009–2011: Dorchester Town
- 2012–2013: Blackfield & Langley
- * Club domestic league appearances and goals

Ashley James Ward Vickers (born 14 June 1972) is an English former professional footballer who played as a centre-back.

== Playing career ==
Born in Sheffield, Vickers began his career as a defender with Sheffield United, but was released at the end of his traineeship and joined non-League Worcester City. He subsequently played for Malvern Town and The 61 Club before joining Heybridge Swifts.

He was playing for Heybridge, managed by Garry Hill in the 1997–98 season, getting sent off in the FA Cup First Round defeat away to AFC Bournemouth in November that year. The following month he joined Peterborough United for a fee of £5,000. He made his Football League debut in the 2–1 home defeat against Brighton & Hove Albion on 28 December 1997, but was sent off late in the game. He was an unused substitute twice later in the season, but that was as near as he got to the Peterborough first team again.

In August 1998, he moved to non-League St Albans City for a fee of £10,000, before joining up again with Garry Hill who was by now managing Conference side Dagenham & Redbridge in March 2000.

He joined Weymouth, managed at the time by Garry Hill, on a free transfer in late May 2006. He signed a new one-year contract with Weymouth on 19 July 2007. He signed for Eastleigh on 4 March 2008 and subsequently in August 2008 he joined Newport County on a three-month loan deal.

== Coaching career ==
In March 2009, Vickers joined Dorchester Town as player-assistant manager to new player-manager Roy O'Brien. O'Brien was sacked on 21 November 2009, following a humiliating 3–0 defeat to fierce local rivals Weymouth in the FA Trophy with Vickers becoming caretaker manager for the rest of the season. Having turned Dorchester's season around, with the team going on to an impressive run of form, Vickers was given the role permanently in March 2010. He was suspended in March 2011 for tackling a man who had come onto the field in a mankini.

In October 2011, Vickers left Dorchester by mutual consent. In January 2012 he became manager of Blackfield & Langley After winning the Wessex League title in 2012–13 he left the club. He signed as a player for Andover Town in April 2016 and played there for a few weeks.
