= Jim Murple Memorial =

French band (f.1996)

Jim Murple Memorial is a French ska and R&B band formed in Paris in 1996. Although French, most of their song lyrics are in English.

== Venues and festivals ==
They have performed in numerous venues and have played at several music festivals including:

- Les Vieilles Charrues, Le Printemps de Bourges, Festival du Bout du Monde
- Crozon, Artrock
- St-Brieuc States of Rock
- Évreux, FestiVal de Marne
- Champigny, Festival Elephants 3
- Lassay-les-Trois-Chateaux, Chorus Hauts-de-Seine
- Vanves, Jazz of Defense
- Coutances (Manche) Jazz sous les Pommiers
- Montreal International Jazz Festival

== Albums ==
- 4 - MaAuLa Records (2020)
- Put Things Right - Pias France 2007
- Five'n'Yellow - Pias France (2005)
- Trop Jolie - Pias France (2004)
- Let's Spend Some Love - PIAS France (2003)
- Play The Roots - Patate Records/Tripsichord (2001)
- The Story Of Jim Murple Memorial - Patate Records/Tripsichord (1999)
- Rhythm'n'Blues Jamaïcain - Patate Records/Tripsichord (1998)
- Let's Spend Some Love 33T vinyle - PIAS France (2003)
- Let's Skank Volume 4 - Patate Records (2004)
- Let's Skank Volume 3 - Patate Records (2002)
- Ska Heroes - Emi (2003)
- Let's Skank Volume 2 - Patate Records (2002)
- Kongpilation Hors-série - 10 ans de Banana Juice (2002)
- 10 ans de la Ferarock - Recall/Virgin (2002)
- Global Ska 2 - Revelde Records - SP (2002)
- It's A Frenchy Ska Reggae Party 3 - Big Mama Records/Tripsichord (2002)
- Ska Story - Virgin/Emi (2002)
- Hexagone Riddim - Wagram (2001)
- Mega reggae - Wagram (2001)
- Sur Les Roots De France - Virgin (2000)
- Danse Ska La -
- The Complete Box Set - Patate Records/Tripsichord (2003)
