= Paul Terry (footballer) =

English footballer

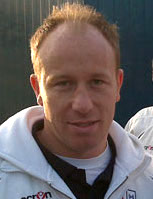
- Terry with Darlington in 2011

Personal information
- Full name: Paul Edward Terry
- Date of birth: 3 April 1979 (age 47)
- Place of birth: Barking, England
- Position: Midfielder

Senior career*
Years	Team	Apps	(Gls)
1999–2003	Dagenham & Redbridge	112	(12)
2003–2007	Yeovil Town	135	(10)
2007–2009	Leyton Orient	71	(1)
2009	Grays Athletic	3	(0)
2009–2010	Rushden & Diamonds	31	(2)
2010–2011	Darlington	24	(2)
2011–2012	Thurrock	46	(2)
Total		422	(29)
- * Club domestic league appearances and goals

Paul Edward Terry (born 3 April 1979) is an English former professional footballer who played as a midfielder, and is currently the assistant manager of Leyton Orient. He made 206 appearances in the Football League for Yeovil Town and Leyton Orient between 2003 and 2009.

== Career ==
Terry began his career in 1999 with Dagenham & Redbridge for whom he made 130 appearances in all competitions in four years, helping the club to the Isthmian League Premier Division title in June 2000. He was called up for the semi-professional England National Game XI in January 2003.

Terry signed for Division Three side Yeovil Town in August 2003. He made 155 league and cup appearances for Yeovil in four years, helping the club to the championship of that division, renamed Football League Two, in May 2005. He signed a new one-year extension to his contract in July 2006, but suffered a cruciate knee ligament injury that required surgery in early December 2006 and ruled him out of the rest of the 2006–07 season.

In June 2007, after his contract with Yeovil expired, he joined League One side Leyton Orient on a one-year contract. Terry made 49 appearances for Orient in the 2007–08 season and signed a new one-year contract in June 2008, and scored his only league goal for Orient the following season in the 2–0 win at Walsall on 6 September 2008. He made 81 appearances in total for Orient before he was one of eight players released by manager Geraint Williams at the end of the 2008–09 season.

Terry signed for Conference National club Grays Athletic on 10 August 2009. He made three appearances for Grays before joining fellow Conference side Rushden & Diamonds on 31 August until the end of the 2009–10 season. He left Rushden & Diamonds at the end of the season.

On 3 August 2010, he joined Darlington after a successful trial. He then joined Thurrock for the start of the 2011–12 season.

After retiring from football, Terry worked as an agent for six years before joining Richie Wellens at Oldham Athletic as the first-team coach in November 2017. After leaving in January 2018, Terry returned to Yeovil in the summer of 2018 to take up a role in manager Darren Way's coaching staff. Terry Joined West Bromwich Albion as the loan manager for the club in July 2019 to oversee the development of youth and first-team players leaving the club on loan. Terry was charged in November 2020 by the F.A. for breaching Rule E8 pertaining to betting, where it is alleged Terry placed 209 bets between 1 November 2017 and 25 October 2019.

== Personal life ==
He is the older brother of former Chelsea and England defender John Terry. He has two children with his former wife Sarah Konchesky, sister of Paul Konchesky; one is Colchester United footballer Frankie Terry.

He had an affair with Lindsey Cowan the fiancée of teammate Dale Roberts during their time together at Rushden & Diamonds, which an inquest included as a major contributing factor in Roberts taking his own life.

== Honours ==
Yeovil Town

- Football League Two: 2004–05

Darlington

- FA Trophy: 2010–11
