= Simon Marples =

English footballer

Personal information
- Date of birth: 30 July 1975 (age 51)
- Place of birth: Sheffield, England
- Position: Defender

Youth career
- Sheffield Wednesday
- Rotherham United

Senior career*
Years	Team	Apps	(Gls)
1994–1999	Stocksbridge	-	(-)
1999–2006	Doncaster Rovers	154	(0)
2006–2008	Chester City	46	(0)
2008–2009	Alfreton Town	19	(0)
- * Club domestic league appearances and goals as of 26/1/2009

Simon Marples (born 30 July 1975 in Sheffield) is an English former football defender.

Marples was on the books of Sheffield Wednesday and Rotherham United as a youngster. He then joined non-league side Stocksbridge Park Steels in 1994, working his way into the first team after impressive performances in the reserves.

In 1999 Marples moved to Doncaster Rovers for £12,000, which remains a club record fee received for a Stocksbridge player. Marples impressed so much in his early weeks at the club that he attracted interest from Premier League clubs, with Rovers valuing him at more than £200,000.

Maples stayed with Rovers and was part of the teams that won the Football Conference playoffs and the Division 3 championship in successive seasons from 2003 to 2004.

He signed for Chester in the summer of 2006 on a free transfer and over the next two years would again fail to find the net in more than 50 first–team appearances. In March 2008 he was placed on 'gardening leave' at Chester, believed to be following a dispute over his non-selection in the team. He did not play for the club again and was released at the end of the season.

== Honours ==
Doncaster Rovers

- Football League Third Division: 2003–04
