= Adriano Rigoglioso =

English footballer (born 1979)

Personal information
- Full name: Adriano Rigoglioso
- Date of birth: 28 May 1979 (age 47)
- Place of birth: Liverpool, England
- Height: 6 ft 1 in (1.85 m)
- Position: Midfielder

Youth career
- Liverpool

Senior career*
| Years | Team | Apps | (Gls) |
| 1997–1998 | Liverpool | 0 | (0) |
| 1998–2000 | Marine | ? | (?) |
| 2000–2003 | Morecambe | 116 | (19) |
| 2003–2006 | Doncaster Rovers | 29 | (0) |
| 2005 | → Southport (loan) | 1 | (0) |
| 2006–2007 | Morecambe | 17 | (0) |
| 2006 | → Forest Green Rovers (loan) | 5 | (3) |
| 2007–2009 | Forest Green Rovers | 57 | (14) |
| 2009 | Grays Athletic | 2 | (0) |
| 2009 | Colwyn Bay | ? | (?) |
| 2009–2010 | FC United of Manchester | 6 | (0) |
| 2010 | Colwyn Bay | ? | (?) |
| 2010 | Chester | 0 | (0) |
| 2010–2011 | Ashton United | 15 | (3) |
| 2011 | Marine | ? | (?) |
| 2012 | Rhyl | ? | (?) |
| 2012 | Conwy Borough | 0 | (0) |
| 2012 | Northwich Victoria | 3 | (0) |
| Total | | 251 | (39) |
- * Club domestic league appearances and goals

Adriano Rigoglioso (born 29 May 1979) is an English former footballer who played as a midfielder.

== Career ==
Rigoglioso began his career as a goalkeeper with Liverpool, and played in the same youth team as Michael Owen, Steven Gerrard and Jamie Carragher. However, he did not make the grade and joined Marine.

He was signed by Morecambe in the summer of 2000. Playing as striker, he was limited to a few substitute appearances.

Moved into midfield for the 2001–02 season, Rigoglioso had a more successful run in the side but was still not considered a regular. The following season, he was moved into the 'hole' behind the striker, and formed a formidable partnership with Wayne Curtis in a Morecambe side that made the Conference play-offs.

His form attracted attention from a number of other clubs, with Chester City in particular having several bids turned down.

At the beginning of the 2003–04 season, Doncaster Rovers made a bid for the player. This was turned down by the Morecambe board of directors. This bid appeared to unsettle Rigoglioso and many believe he engineered a second bid to be accepted after several disciplinary issues, before joining Doncaster in November 2003.

His move to Doncaster did not go as well as he might have hoped. He scored his first and only goal for the team in a Football League Trophy tie against Hereford United in November 2004. He did not feature in the first team to any great extent, and during the 2005–06 season he spent an unsuccessful loan spell at Southport, where his only match was a 4–0 loss at Accrington Stanley.

He rejoined Morecambe in March 2006, initially on loan. Again, his appearances were limited to short substitute appearances, and it was surprising when he was awarded a contract for the 2006–07 season. Again, the start of the season saw his first team role restricted to a few substitute appearances, and he spent October 2006 on loan at Forest Green Rovers, managed by former Morecambe manager Jim Harvey. On his return, Rigoglioso went straight back into the Morecambe first team, in the withdrawn striker role that had previously worked well for him.

He wore Adriano on the back of his shirt rather than his surname, citing the fact that stadium announcers often mispronounce his surname. His nickname, given to him by his family, is Celi after the Italian easy-listening popstar Adriano Celentano, famous for his chart hit "Una Festa Sui Prati", in English, "A Party on the open area of grass".

Rigoglioso was released by Morecambe on 24 January 2007, after a discussion with Sammy McIlroy, who told him he would be bringing in more players, thereby limiting Rigoglioso's first team opportunities. He signed for Forest Green in a permanent deal lasting until the end of the 2007–08 season. Rigoglioso went on to make over 50 league appearances for Forest Green and featured in Forest Green's FA Cup third round defeat to Derby County at The New Lawn but was released at the end of the 2008–09 season.

At the start of the 2009–10 season, Rigoglioso signed for Grays Athletic along with eight other players, before being released in November. In November 2009, Rigoglioso was signed by Colwyn Bay in the Northern Premier League Division One North. He signed for Northern Premier League Premier Division club FC United of Manchester on 31 December 2009, before leaving in March 2010. He then rejoined Colwyn Bay for his second spell at the club. On 4 June 2010 he teamed up with his former Colwyn Bay manager Neil Young at newly formed Chester but joined Ashton United without featuring for Chester, scoring on his debut against Matlock Town in September 2010.

On 9 January 2011, Rigoglioso returned to former club Marine and left the club at the end of April.

In January 2012 he joined Rhyl. After ending the 2011–12 season with Rhyl, in June 2012 Rigoglioso signed for Conwy Borough but moved without playing a game for the club to Northwich Victoria during July, where he became player-coach. He left the club, along with manager Andy Mutch on 3 November.

== Honours ==
Doncaster Rovers

- Football League Third Division: 2003–04
