= Murple (band) =

- Origin: Rome, Italy
- Genres: Progressive rock
- Years active: 1973–1975; 2007–present
- Labels: BASF, BTF, AMS
- Members: Piercarlo Zanco; Mauro Arno; Claudia D'Ottavi; Mario Garbarino; Duilio Sorrenti
- Past members: Pino Santamaria

Murple are an Italian psychedelic rock/progressive rock band.

== History ==
The activity of the band Murple begins in Rome as a local pop musicians in the time. In 1973 the band up with Pino Santamaria on guitar, Piercarlo Zanco on keyboards, Mario Garbarino on bass and Duilio Sorrenti on drums.

With the production of Roberto Marsala, they recorded their first album Io sono Murple for the label BASF Fare, which had just been born in Italy and published it in 1974. The disc consists of a suite that describes the journey of the Penguin Murple from the Pole to a zoo. Perhaps because of the delay in the publication, related to the speed with which changed the musical tastes of the time, the disc to its output is fairly criticized, leading to a very limited distribution, despite the good that consideration is given instead still at work today.

The concept of Io sono Murple was based on two long suites divided into six movements each that tell the story of the penguin Murple who, to escape the unchanging everyday of his life, decides spontaneously to move away from the herd and from its natural habitat. Unfortunately, it does not have time to enjoy the wonders of the world. Murple is captured by humans ("Nessuna scelta": No Choice) and forced to perform first in a circus ("Tra i fili" - Between the wires), then in the zoo ("Antarplastic") where it will end its days trapped in a small plastic iceberg.

The formation of the group changes, with Roberto Puleo which replaces Mario Garbarino on bass. The Murple participate Pop Festival Villa Pamphili in Rome in 1974 and work on preparing a second album, which, however, will not be published. The Murple perform as a support group is that of Mal Gianfranca Montedoro, for which they perform both on stage and in the recording of the album Donna circo in 1975, but subsequently, melt.

In 2007, the group was reconstituted with Garbarino, Sorrenti and Zanco, and in 2008 released a new album, Quadri di un'esposizione (Pictures at an Exhibition).

== Discography ==
- 1974: Io sono Murple (BASF Fare, 21-23317 X)
- 2008: Quadri di un'esposizione (AMS/BTF)

== See also ==
- Italian progressive rock
