= Mark Quayle (footballer) =

English footballer

Personal information
- Full name: Mark Leslie Quayle
- Date of birth: 2 October 1978 (age 48)
- Place of birth: Liverpool, England
- Position: Striker

Senior career*
| Years | Team | Apps | (Gls) |
| 1995–1997 | Everton | 0 | (0) |
| 1998–2000 | Notts County | 5 | (0) |
| 1999 | → Grantham Town (loan) | ? | (?) |
| 2000–2001 | Morecambe | 20 | (8) |
| 2001 | → Telford United (loan) | 7 | (7) |
| 2001–2002 | Telford United | 17 | (6) |
| 2002–2003 | Nuneaton Borough | 29 | (14) |
| 2003 | → Chester City (loan) | 8 | (1) |
| 2003–2004 | Scarborough | 36 | (14) |
| 2004–2005 | Northwich Victoria | 30 | (9) |
| 2005–2006 | Scarborough | 17 | (3) |
| 2006 | Hyde United | 6 | (2) |
| 2007–2008 | Colwyn Bay | ? | (?) |
- * Club domestic league appearances and goals

Mark Leslie Quayle (born 2 October 1978) is an English former footballer.

He played for Everton, Notts County, Grantham Town, Morecambe, Telford United, Nuneaton Borough, Chester City, Scarborough, Northwich Victoria, Hyde United and Colwyn Bay. Quayle scored a lot of goals in the non-league game including a crucial winning goal against Southend United in a third round FA Cup replay, which secured Scarborough a lucrative home tie against Chelsea in the next round.

== Honours ==
Individual

- Football Conference Goalscorer of the Month: August 2002
