= Lee Goodwin =

English footballer (born 1978)

Personal information
- Full name: Lee Jon Goodwin
- Date of birth: 5 September 1978 (age 48)
- Place of birth: Stepney, England
- Height: 6 ft 1 in (1.85 m)
- Position: Defender

Youth career
- ?–1998: West Ham United

Senior career*
Years	Team	Apps	(Gls)
1998–2008	Dagenham & Redbridge	147	(15)

Managerial career
- 2011–2012: Thurrock (joint-caretaker)
- * Club domestic league appearances and goals

Lee Jon Goodwin (born 5 September 1978) is an English former footballer who played for West Ham United and Dagenham & Redbridge as a defender.

== Career ==
Born in Stepney, London, Goodwin was a trainee at West Ham United, before signing for Dagenham & Redbridge in 1998. He scored the winning goal for Dagenham in a 2–1 victory over Doncaster Rovers after heading the ball in on 67 minutes in March 2001. He was sent off in a 0–0 draw with Doncaster in November after receiving a second yellow card after a late challenge on Neil Campbell. He suffered what was believed to be a metatarsal fracture in September 2002. He signed a new contract with Dagenham in December 2003, before signing a two-year contract in May 2004. He was ruled out for the remainder of the 2005–06 season after suffering a stress fracture of his leg in March 2006. He signed a new three-year contract in May. He made one appearance in the Football League for Dagenham, after being introduced as an 88th minute substitute against Mansfield Town on 3 May 2008. He retired from playing in July. In October 2010 he was awarded a testimonial by Dagenham. On 11 October Dagenham played a West Ham United XI at Victoria Road with The Hammers winning 3–2 in front of 2,267 spectators. He was a coach at Dagenham & Redbridge but was then appointed first-team coach with Thurrock. He became joint caretaker manager with Grant Gordon and then left the club at the end of May 2012 with the season complete.

== Honours ==
- Isthmian League: 2000
- Essex Senior Cup: 2001; Runner-up 2002
- Conference National: 2007
- FA Youth Cup: Runner-up 1996
