= Dave Morley =

English footballer

Personal information
- Full name: David Thomas Morley
- Date of birth: 25 September 1977 (age 49)
- Place of birth: St Helens, England
- Height: 6 ft 1 in (1.85 m)
- Position: Defender

Youth career
- 1995–1997: Manchester City

Senior career*
| Years | Team | Apps | (Gls) |
| 1997–1998 | Manchester City | 2 | (1) |
| 1998 | → Ayr United (loan) | 4 | (0) |
| 1998–2001 | Southend United | 76 | (0) |
| 2001 | → Carlisle United (loan) | 6 | (1) |
| 2001–2002 | Carlisle United | 35 | (0) |
| 2001–2002 | → Oxford United (loan) | 3 | (1) |
| 2002 | Oxford United | 15 | (2) |
| 2002–2005 | Doncaster Rovers | 59 | (6) |
| 2005–2007 | Macclesfield Town | 103 | (7) |
| 2007–2009 | Hyde United | 47 | (4) |
| 2009–2013 | Bangor City | 113 | (21) |
| 2013 | Caernarfon | 0 | (0) |
| 2013–2014 | Bala Town | 28 | (1) |
| Total | | 491 | (44) |
- * Club domestic league appearances and goals

David Thomas Morley (born 25 September 1977 in St Helens) is an English former footballer.

Morley started his career at Manchester City. He made 20 starts for the club's reserve team in 1996–97, and broke into the senior team for the first time the following season. He made a goalscoring debut against Bury on 12 September 1997, but did not make any further starts for the club, two substitute appearances providing his only other first team action.

He subsequently played for Southend, Carlisle (where he scored once against Mansfield Town) and Doncaster Rovers. He joined Macclesfield Town in January 2005, where he later became captain, leading out the side for their 2007 FA Cup tie against Chelsea at Stamford Bridge. He signed a new contract in June 2007, but left Macclesfield four months later after his contract was cancelled by mutual consent following a particularly poor performance in a 3–2 defeat at Accrington.

Morley joined Bangor City in 2009, where he made 113 league appearances over four years, scoring twenty-one goals; he departed for Caernarfon where he did not play before he left in July 2013 for Bala Town, where he spent the 2013–14 season.

== Honours ==
Doncaster Rovers

- Football League Third Division: 2003–04
