= Jamie Paterson (footballer, born 1973) =

Scottish footballer

Personal information
- Full name: Jamie Ryan Paterson
- Date of birth: 26 April 1973 (age 53)
- Place of birth: Dumfries, Scotland
- Height: 5 ft 5 in (1.65 m)
- Position: Midfielder

Youth career
- Halifax Town

Senior career*
Years	Team	Apps	(Gls)
1991–1994	Halifax Town	44	(5)
1994–1995	Falkirk	4	(0)
1995–1997	Scunthorpe United	55	(2)
1997–2000	Halifax Town	78	(31)
2000–2004	Doncaster Rovers	100	(34)
- Barrow
- * Club domestic league appearances and goals

Jamie Ryan Paterson (born 26 April 1973) is a Scottish former professional footballer who played as a midfielder.

== Career ==
Born in Dumfries, Paterson played for Halifax Town, Falkirk, Scunthorpe United, Doncaster Rovers and Barrow.
