= Garry Hill =

English football manager

Managerial career
- Years: Team
- Priory Sports
- 1991–1997: Heybridge Swifts
- 1997–1999: St Albans City
- 1999–2004: Dagenham & Redbridge
- 2004–2005: Hornchurch
- 2005–2007: Weymouth
- 2007–2009: Rushden & Diamonds
- 2011–2017: Woking
- 2018–2019: Ebbsfleet United

Garry Hill is an English football manager who was last the manager of National League club Ebbsfleet United. He previously managed Woking, Heybridge Swifts, St Albans City, Dagenham & Redbridge, Hornchurch, Weymouth and Rushden & Diamonds.

== Coaching career ==
=== Heybridge Swifts ===
Hill began his non-league managerial career with Heybridge Swifts, following a spell managing Chelmsford Sunday League side Priory Sports, where he managed former professional players Alan Brazil, Micky Droy and Paul Parker. Hill took the village team to the Isthmian Premier Division and the FA Cup first round for the first time.

=== St Albans City ===
He then moved on to St Albans City before in the summer of 1999 taking over as manager of Dagenham & Redbridge.

=== Dagenham & Redbridge ===
He led the club to the Isthmian League title and promotion to the Conference in his first season in charge. The following season, Hill's side finished third in the Conference and took Premiership Charlton Athletic to a replay in the Third Round of the FA Cup. They again reached the FA Cup third round in the 2001–02 season, losing 4–1 to Ipswich Town after taking the lead, and finished second in the Conference, missing promotion to the Football League on goal difference. The following season saw another run in the FA Cup, beating Plymouth Argyle after a replay in the Third Round before losing 1–0 to Norwich City thanks to an injury time goal. Their league form was not particularly good until the latter stages of the season when they won eleven consecutive games and qualified for the play-off final, losing 3–2 in extra-time to Doncaster Rovers. The 2003–04 season was not a success and Hill resigned soon after a 9–0 defeat at home to Hereford United late in the season.

=== Hornchurch ===
In May 2004 he took over as manager of ambitious Isthmian League side Hornchurch, but left shortly after the club went into administration in January 2005 after their owners, the Carthium Group ceased trading. At the time the club were top of the table and had been dubbed the 'non-league Chelsea' due to their extravagant spending on players from higher-level clubs.

=== Weymouth ===
Hill took over as manager of Weymouth on 22 March 2005 and led them to promotion to the Conference at the end of the following season. On 21 October 2006, Hill was rushed to hospital in Dorchester after suffering chest pains near the end of Weymouth's Conference game with Rushden & Diamonds. Tests revealed no heart problems and he returned to the club after a short period of rest. In January 2007, Hill, and his assistant Kevin Hales, were sacked by Weymouth, following the announcement of a major restructuring of the club, which saw the entire first-team squad placed on the transfer-list in order to cut unsustainable costs at the club.

=== Rushden & Diamonds ===
In February 2007 Hill was appointed as the manager of Rushden & Diamonds following the dismissal of Graham Westley. In September 2007 Hill was involved in an incident after a 1–1 draw with Salisbury City. For head-butting Salisbury assistant manager Tommy Widdrington, Hill received a two-week suspension and a 10-game touchline ban from the FA. On 10 February 2009, Hill resigned as manager of Rushden & Diamonds.

=== Woking ===
Hill was appointed manager of Woking on 20 January 2011. Woking finished the 2010–2011 season in 5th place in the Conference South, and finished the 2011–2012 season in 1st, winning promotion to the Conference Premier.

=== Ebbsfleet United ===
On 8 November 2018, Hill was appointed manager of Ebbsfleet replacing Daryl McMahon. He was sacked by Ebbsfleet on 10 October 2019. Following his sacking at Ebbsfleet, Hill was set to take over at National League South club Chelmsford City in February 2020, before the deal fell through during contract negotiations.

== Managerial statistics ==
As of match played 8 October 2019

Managerial record by team and tenure
| Team | Nat | From | To | Record | | | | | Ref. |
| Team | Nat | From | To | G | W | D | L | Win % | Ref. |
|---|---|---|---|---|---|---|---|---|---|
| St Albans City | (England) | 20 May 1997 | 1 July 1999 | 101 | 43 | 29 | 29 | 42.57 | |
| Dagenham & Redbridge | (England) | 1 July 1999 | 1 March 2004 | 240 | 129 | 47 | 64 | 53.75 | |
| Hornchurch | (England) | 1 May 2004 | 24 January 2005 | 34 | 16 | 8 | 10 | 47.06 | |
| Weymouth | (England) | 22 March 2005 | 9 January 2007 | 84 | 52 | 10 | 22 | 61.90 | |
| Rushden & Diamonds | (England) | 26 February 2007 | 10 February 2009 | 108 | 40 | 30 | 38 | 37.04 | |
| Woking | (England) | 20 January 2011 | 4 May 2017 | 323 | 146 | 65 | 112 | 45.20 | |
| Ebbsfleet United | (England) | 8 November 2018 | 10 October 2019 | 45 | 14 | 13 | 18 | 31.11 | |
| Career Total | | | | 935 | 440 | 202 | 293 | 47.06 | — |

== Honours ==
Heybridge Swifts

- Isthmian League Division One North: 1995–96 (promotion)

Dagenham & Redbridge

- Isthmian League Premier Division: 1999–2000

Weymouth

- Conference South: 2005–06

Woking

- Conference South: 2011–12
- Surrey Senior Cup: 2013–14, 2016–17
