= Thurrock F.C. =

English football club

Coordinates: 51°29′22″N 0°15′54″E

Thurrock
- Full name: Thurrock Football Club
- Nickname: The Fleet
- Founded: 1984 (as Essex Sports)
- Dissolved: 2018; 8 years ago
- Ground: Ship Lane, Thurrock
- Capacity: 3,500 (524 seated)
- Final season; 2017–18: Isthmian League Premier Division, 15th of 24
Home colours	Away colours

Thurrock Football Club was an English football club based in Purfleet, Thurrock, Essex. Known as Purfleet until 2003, the club played at Ship Lane.

== History ==
Originally being founded as Essex Sports in 1984, the club was renamed to Purfleet in April 1985, in order to play senior football, and entered the Reserve Division of the Essex Senior League in 1985 and spent one season in that division before joining the first-team league. After finishing third and winning the league cup in their first season, they won the league and cup double in 1987–88, earning promotion to Division Two North of the Isthmian League. They finished as runners-up in their first season and were promoted to Division One. However, the following season they were relegated back to Division Two North after finishing second from bottom.

In 1991–92 the club won the division, and were promoted to Division One. Two seasons later they finished second, and were promoted to the Premier Division. In 2003 the club changed its name to Thurrock, and after finishing third in the league at the end of the 2003–04 season, in which they also won the league cup and the Essex Senior Cup, became founder members of the Conference South.

In the club's first season in the new league, they qualified for the promotion play-offs but were knocked out by Eastbourne Borough. However, they did win the Essex Senior Cup for a second successive season. In 2008–09 the club finished in the relegation zone, but were reprieved after Team Bath resigned from the league. In 2010–11 the club again finished in the relegation zone, but were reprieved after Rushden & Diamonds were expelled from the Conference National league hence Southport were not relegated from the Conference National.

Thurrock announced manager Robbie Garvey resigned following the club's defeat against fellow Conference strugglers Staines Town on 5 December 2011. Lee Goodwin and Grant Gordon took charge of the team on a match by match basis until a new manager was appointed. Thurrock were relegated at the end of the season, finishing bottom of the Conference South. In 2012–13, they initially finished 19th in the Isthmian Premier, two spots above relegation, but then had three points controversially deducted for fielding an ineligible player, dropping them to last place and thus relegating them to Division One North of the Isthmian League. The three points were deducted after the season ended despite the offence taking place in August leading to a protracted legal dispute.

2013–14 saw Thurrock fall short of the play-offs on the final game of the season. A 2–1 defeat to Tilbury combined with Needham Market beating Chatham Town 7–1 saw Needham Market take the last play-off place on goal difference. Thurrock went one better in 2014–15 finishing in fifth place. They went on to beat Harlow Town 4–3 after extra time in the play-off semi final but were beaten 5–0 by Brentwood Town in the final. In 2015-2016 Thurrock once more made the play-offs taking league runners-up position but were beaten 2–0 by AFC Hornchurch in the play-off semi final. 2016-2017 saw Thurrock make it three play-offs in a row as they finished 3rd gaining promotion to the Isthmian League Premier division by beating both AFC Hornchurch and Maldon & Tiptree 1–0.

On 27 August 2017, chairman Tommy South announced that for health reasons he would be selling Thurrock and stepping down at the end of the 2017/18 season. With no buyer forthcoming Thurrock formally resigned from the Isthmian League on 31 March 2018. Thurrock won their last home game at Ship Lane on 21 April 2018 against Kingstonian and lost their final competitive fixture away to Staines Town on 28 April 2018. They finished 15th in the 2017–18 Isthmian League.

== Stadium ==
The club played at Ship Lane since their establishment in April 1985 until the end in 2018. At first the ground was a part of the Thurrock Hotel complex, and initially consisted of two pitches and dressing rooms in the main hotel building. Due to this set-up the club could only compete at Junior level. The playing area was turned around 90° to make one full pitch and dressing rooms were built so the club could become a separate entity.

Floodlights were erected in January 1988 after planning permission was accepted from Thurrock Council to add these features as well as a grandstand.

In 2025, Grays Athletic announced they would take ownership of the derelict former Thurrock F.C. stadium at Ship Lane, with plans to begin refurbishment and aim for a return in the 2026–27 season - following the approval of a joint planning application with Group One Automotive and the finalisation of legal agreements in mid-2024.

== Honours ==
- Essex Senior League
  - Champions: 1987–88
  - League Cup Winners: 1986–87, 1987–88
- Isthmian League
  - Division Two Champions: 1991–92
  - League Cup winners: 2003–04
- Essex Senior Cup
  - Winners: 2003–04, 2004–05

== Records ==
- Best league performance: Third in the Conference South, 2004–05
- Best FA Cup performance: First round proper, 2003–04, 2004–05
- Best FA Trophy performance: Fourth round, 2004–05
- Best FA Vase performance: Fourth round, 1990–91
