= 2015–16 Rotherham United F.C. season =

Rotherham United
2015–16 season
- Chairman: Tony Stewart
- Manager: Steve Evans (left on 28 September 2015); Eric Black (caretaker manager 28 September 2015 – 9 October 2015); Neil Redfearn (9 October 2015 – 8 February 2016); Neil Warnock (11 February 2016 – 18 May 2016)
- Stadium: AESSEAL New York Stadium
- Championship: 21st
- FA Cup: Third round (eliminated by Leeds United)
- League Cup: Second round (eliminated by Norwich City)
- Top goalscorer: League: Derbyshire (8); All: Derbyshire (8)
- Highest home attendance: 11,658 (23 October 2015 vs Sheffield Wednesday)
- Lowest home attendance: 8,534 (23 February 2016 vs Brentford)
- Average home league attendance: 10,013
Home colours	Away colours	Third colours

The 2015–16 season was Rotherham United's 91st season in their existence and the second consecutive season in the Championship. Last season, Rotherham secured their place in this season's championship with a 21st-placed finish, 5 points from the relegation zone. Along with competing in the Championship, the club also participated in the FA Cup, at which they entered in the third round, and League Cup.

== Key events ==
On 8 July 2015, Eric Black was appointed first-team coach, after leaving Wigan Athletic at the end of the previous season.

On 23 July 2015, it was revealed that defender Kirk Broadfoot had been given a 10-game ban for the start of the upcoming season due to sectarian abuse. The incident occurred on 14 March 2015 in a home encounter against Wigan Athletic, where he was deemed by an FA tribunal to have made sectarian comments about Wigan's James McClean. As well as the 10-game ban, Broadfoot was also ordered to pay £7,500 and complete an education programme. It is currently the longest ban for verbal abuse in English football history.

On 3 September 2015, Steve Evans appointed midfielder Lee Frecklington as the new club captain. Frecklington replaced Greg Halford as the captain for the season, with Evans citing that Halford had would be able to focus on his individual game as a result of this decision.

On 28 September 2015, the club released a statement detailing that Steve Evans and Paul Raynor had left the club after three years in charge. The two parties were stated as wanting to move in "different directions" with the club, resulting in Evans and Raynor leaving the club. First-team coach Eric Black would take temporary charge of the team until Evans' successor was appointed.

On 9 October 2015, Rotherham United announced the appointment of former Leeds United head coach Neil Redfearn as the new manager of the club. Redfearn agreed a two-and-a-half-year deal with the club. He was unveiled in an official press conference on the following Monday, 12 October.

On 3 December 2015, Rotherham suspended new signing Simon Lenighan following his trial for assaulting three women. Rotherham also opened their own investigation into the matter. The investigation resulted in the termination of Lenighan's contract on 4 February 2016.

On 11 December 2015, Andrew Hughes was appointed as the first team development coach.

On 25 January 2016, Eric Black left the club by mutual agreement, to become assistant manager at Aston Villa.

On 4 February 2016, the club confirmed the appointment of Nicky Eaden for a second spell as assistant manager. Eaden left his role as a coach with Leicester City Under 21s prior to the confirmation. This was Eaden's second spell in the management team at the club, having previously been appointed by Andy Liddell in 2011.

On 8 February 2016, it was announced that Neil Redfearn had been relieved of his managerial duties. Redfearn had been in charge of the team for 21 games, losing 14 of them and with a win percentage of 23.8%. The following day, the club announced that coach Andy Hughes had also left the club and that Nicky Eaden would take charge of the first team until a new manager was appointed.

On 11 February 2016, the club announced the appointment of Neil Warnock as manager and Kevin Blackwell as assistant manager, both until the end of the season. As a consequence, Nicky Eaden was demoted to first team coach.

On 18 May 2016, it was announced that Warnock would not be continuing as manager. Along with assistant Blackwell and Ronnie Jepson, he left the club with immediate effect.

== Squad statistics ==
=== Player statistics ===
As of 8 May 2016

No.	Pos.	Nat.	Name	Total		Championship		Capital One Cup		FA Cup		Discipline	
No.	Pos.	Nat.	Name	Apps	Goals	Apps	Goals	Apps	Goals	Apps	Goals	Yellow card	Red card
1	GK	(Northern Ireland)	Lee Camp	42	0	41	0	0	0	1	0	0	0
13	GK	(England)	Alex Cairns	0	0	0	0	0	0	0	0	0	0
21	GK	(England)	Adam Collin	2	0	1	0	1	0	0	0	0	0
2	DF	(England)	Lewis Buxton	20+2	0	18+2	0	2	0	0	0	1	0
3	DF	(England)	Joe Mattock	36	1	35	1	0	0	1	0	8	1
4	DF	(Wales)	Danny Collins	23+3	2	21+3	2	2	0	0	0	3	0
5	DF	(Scotland)	Kirk Broadfoot	32+1	1	31+1	1	0	0	1	0	8	0
6	DF	(England)	Richard Wood	13	0	13	0	0	0	0	0	2	1
12	DF	(Republic of Ireland)	Stephen Kelly	13+2	0	13+2	0	0	0	0	0	2	0
15	DF	(England)	Greg Halford	21+2	2	19+2	2	2	0	0	0	5	1
16	DF	(England)	Frazer Richardson	15+5	0	13+4	0	1+1	0	1	0	0	0
23	DF	(England)	Tom Thorpe	5+2	2	5+2	2	0	0	0	0	1	0
26	DF	(Tunisia)	Aymen Belaïd	4	0	3	0	0	0	1	0	0	0
28	DF	(England)	Shay Facey	6	0	5	0	0	0	1	0	1	0
34	DF	(Jamaica)	Lloyd Doyley	3	0	3	0	0	0	0	0	0	0
40	DF	(England)	Mason Warren	0	0	0	0	0	0	0	0	0	0
8	MF	(Republic of Ireland)	Lee Frecklington	28+1	5	26+1	5	2	0	0	0	0	0
10	MF	(Argentina)	Emmanuel Ledesma	3+5	0	1+4	0	2	0	0+1	0	1	0
11	MF	(Republic of Ireland)	Paul Green	15+11	1	14+10	0	0+1	1	1	0	0	0
14	MF	(Scotland)	Chris Burke	5	2	5	2	0	0	0	0	1	0
17	MF	(England)	Grant Ward	35+8	2	33+7	2	1+1	0	1	0	2	0
24	MF	(Scotland)	Andrew Shinnie	1+2	0	1+2	0	0	0	0	0	0	0
25	MF	(Wales)	Chris Dawson	0	0	0	0	0	0	0	0	0	0
33	MF	(England)	Richard Smallwood	44+1	1	42+1	1	1	0	1	0	9	0
7	MF	(England)	Jerome Thomas	3+3	0	3+3	0	0	0	0	0	0	0
22	MF	(England)	Joe Newell	31+7	5	28+7	5	2	0	1	0	5	0
42	MF	(England)	Darnelle Bailey-King	0+1	0	0+1	0	0	0	0	0	0	0
9	FW	(England)	Danny Ward	23+13	4	22+12	4	0+1	0	1	0	2	0
19	FW	(England)	Jonson Clarke-Harris	20+17	6	19+16	6	1	0	0+1	0	6	0
32	FW	(Argentina)	Luciano Becchio	0+2	0	0+2	0	0	0	0	0	0	0
27	FW	(England)	Matt Derbyshire	30+8	8	28+7	8	2	0	0+1	0	5	1
39	FW	(England)	Jerry Yates	0	0	0	0	0	0	0	0	0	0
50	FW	(Republic of Ireland)	Leon Best	10+6	4	10+6	4	0	0	0	0	1	1
Players played for Rotherham this season on loan who returned to their parent club:
1	GK	(Netherlands)	Kelle Roos	5	0	4	0	1	0	0	0	0	0
30	DF	(England)	Harry Toffolo	6+1	0	6+1	0	0	0	0	0	2	0
25	MF	(Belgium)	Vadis Odjidja-Ofoe	4	1	4	0	0	0	0	0	0	0
26	MF	(England)	Brandon Barker	1+3	1	1+3	0	0	0	0	0	0	0
25	MF	(England)	Luke Hyam	2+3	0	2+3	0	0	0	0	0	1	0
24	MF	(France)	Tony Andreu	10+1	2	10+1	2	0	0	0	0	0	0
20	DF	(England)	Farrend Rawson	15+1	2	15+1	2	0	0	0	0	2	0
Players permanently contracted to Rotherham this season who left the club:
14	MF	(Republic of Ireland)	Aidy White	4+6	0	3+5	0	1+1	0	0	0	0	0
18	FW	(England)	Jordan Bowery	3+5	1	2+5	0	1	1	0	0	0	0
7	FW	(Scotland)	Chris Maguire	6+9	0	6+8	0	0+1	0	0	0	3	0

- (starts) + (substitute apps)

=== Goalscorers ===
As of 8 May 2016

Place	Position	Nation	Number	Name	Total	Championship	FA Cup	Capital One Cup
1	FW	(England)	27	Matt Derbyshire	8	8	0	0
2	FW	(England)	19	Jonson Clarke-Harris	6	6	0	0
3	MF	(England)	22	Joe Newell	5	5	0	0
=	MF	(Republic of Ireland)	8	Lee Frecklington	5	5	0	0
5	FW	(England)	9	Danny Ward	4	3	1	0
=	FW	(Republic of Ireland)	50	Leon Best	4	4	0	0
7	DF	(Wales)	5	Danny Collins	2	2	0	0
=	DF	(England)	23	Tom Thorpe	2	2	0	0
=	MF	(England)	17	Grant Ward	2	2	0	0
=	DF	(England)	20	Farrend Rawson	2	2	0	0
=	MF	(France)	24	Tony Andreu	2	2	0	0
=	MF	(Scotland)	14	Chris Burke	2	2	0	0
=	DF	(England)	15	Greg Halford	2	2	0	0
14	FW	(England)	18	Jordan Bowery	1	0	0	1
=	MF	(Republic of Ireland)	11	Paul Green	1	0	0	1
=	MF	(Belgium)	25	Vadis Odjidja-Ofoe	1	1	0	0
=	MF	(England)	26	Brandon Barker	1	1	0	0
=	DF	(Scotland)	5	Kirk Broadfoot	1	1	0	0
=	MF	(England)	33	Richard Smallwood	1	1	0	0

== Pre-season friendlies ==
8 July 2015 Friendly	Parkgate	0–6	Rotherham United	Parkgate, Rotherham
19:30 BST		Report	Ledesma 9'; Green 16' (pen.); G. Ward 58'; D. Ward 66'; Reay 71' (o.g.); Yates 87'	Stadium: Roundwood Sports Complex

11 July 2015 Friendly	Stocksbridge Park Steels	0–3	Rotherham United	Stocksbridge, Sheffield
15:00 BST		Report	Smallwood 18'; G. Ward 35'; Clarke-Harris 47'	Stadium: Bracken Park

14 July 2015 Friendly	Alfreton Town	3–2	Rotherham United	Alfreton, Amber Valley
19:30 BST	Jones 40'; Johnston 79'; Ironside 89'		G. Ward 26', 62'	Stadium: North Street; Attendance: 452

18 July 2015 Friendly	Greenock Morton	0–3	Rotherham United	Greenock, Scotland
15:00 BST		Report	Halford 12'; Frecklington 24'; Clarke-Harris 90'	Stadium: Cappielow; Attendance: 548

21 July 2015 Friendly	Dundee	0–1	Rotherham United	Dundee, Scotland
19:30 BST		Report	Green 62'	Stadium: Dens Park; Attendance: 2,092; Referee: E. Anderson

25 July 2015 Friendly	Partick Thistle	1–1	Rotherham United	Glasgow, Scotland
15:00 BST	Welsh 54'	Report	Derbyshire 34'	Stadium: Firhill Stadium; Attendance: 1,149 (166)

29 July 2015 Friendly	Rotherham United	1–2	Leicester City	Rotherham
19:45 BST	G. Ward 79'	Report	Mahrez 56'; Nugent 72'	Stadium: AESSEAL New York Stadium; Attendance: 3,678 (524); Referee: Mark Brown

1 August 2015 Friendly	Rotherham United	2–1	1. FSV Mainz 05	Rotherham
15:00 BST	Derbyshire 80'; Bowery 88'	Report	Balogun 72'	Stadium: AESSEAL New York Stadium; Attendance: 3,746 (11); Referee: Paul Tierney

== Competitions ==
=== Championship ===
On 17 June 2015, the fixtures for the forthcoming season were announced.

==== League table ====
Pos	Team	Pld	W	D	L	GF	GA	GD	Pts	Promotion, qualification or relegation
19	Huddersfield Town	46	13	12	21	59	70	−11	51	
20	Fulham	46	12	15	19	66	79	−13	51	
21	Rotherham United	46	13	10	23	53	71	−18	49	
22	Charlton Athletic (R)	46	9	13	24	40	80	−40	40	Relegation to EFL League One
23	Milton Keynes Dons (R)	46	9	12	25	39	69	−30	39	Relegation to EFL League One

Source: BBC Sport
Rules for classification: 1) Points; 2) Goal difference; 3) Number of goals scored
(R) Relegated

==== Results summary ====
Overall								Home						Away					
Pld	W	D	L	GF	GA	GD	Pts	W	D	L	GF	GA	GD	W	D	L	GF	GA	GD
46	13	10	23	53	71	−18	49	8	6	9	31	34	−3	5	4	14	22	37	−15

Last updated: 7 May 2016.

==== Matchday summary ====
Matchday	1	2	3	4	5	6	7	8	9	10	11	12	13	14	15	16	17	18	19	20	21	22	23	24	25	26	27	28	29	30	31	32	33	34	35	36	37	38	39	40	41	42	43	44	45	46
Ground	H	A	H	A	H	A	A	H	A	H	A	H	H	A	A	H	A	H	H	A	A	H	H	A	A	H	H	A	H	A	H	A	A	H	A	H	H	A	H	D	A	H	H	A	H	A
Result	L	L	D	L	L	D	L	W	W	L	L	D	L	L	L	L	W	W	L	L	L	W	W	L	L	W	L	D	L	L	D	L	L	W	W	W	D	W	W	D	W	D	D	D	L	L
Position	24	24	22	24	24	24	24	24	20	21	23	23	23	24	24	24	23	23	23	23	23	22	21	21	21	20	21	21	21	22	22	22	22	22	22	22	22	20	20	21	21	21	20	19	20	21

Updated to match(es) played on 13 May 2016. Source:
A = Away; H = Home; W = Win; D = Draw; L = Loss

==== Fixtures ====
8 August 2015 1	Rotherham United	1–4	Milton Keynes Dons	Rotherham
15:00 BST	Derbyshire 13'	Match Report	Hall 5'; Collins 28' (og.); Bowditch 35'; Baker 75'	Stadium: AESSEAL New York Stadium; Attendance: 9,869 (849); Referee: Nigel Miller

15 August 2015 2	Nottingham Forest	2–1	Rotherham United	Nottingham
15:00 BST	Mills 45+2'; Antonio 61'	Match Report	Collins 13'	Stadium: City Ground; Attendance: 19,885 (1,517); Referee: Darren Bond

18 August 2015 3	Rotherham United	0–0	Preston North End	Rotherham
19:45 BST		Report		Stadium: AESSEAL New York Stadium; Attendance: 9,078 (1.040); Referee: David Coote

22 August 2015 4	Queens Park Rangers	4–2	Rotherham United	London
15:00 BST	Chery 42', 50'; Austin 63', 90' (pen.)	Match Report	Clarke-Harris 72'; Thorpe 88'	Stadium: Loftus Road; Attendance: 15,009 (743); Referee: Dean Whitestone

29 August 2015 5	Rotherham United	1–3	Fulham	Rotherham
15:00 BST	Clarke-Harris 72'	Match Report	Pringle 7'; McCormack 16' (pen.); Woodrow 90+3'	Stadium: AESSEAL New York Stadium; Attendance: 8839 (704); Referee: Geoff Eltringham

12 September 2015 6	Charlton Athletic	1–1	Rotherham United	Charlton
15:00 BST	Bauer 65'	Report	Rawson 38'	Stadium: The Valley; Attendance: 15,220; Referee: Keith Stroud

15 September 2015 7	Brighton & Hove Albion	2–1	Rotherham United	Falmer
19:45 BST	Hemed 27'; Stephens 67'	Report	Clarke-Harris 71'	Stadium: Falmer Stadium; Attendance: 21,397; Referee: James Linington

19 September 2015 8	Rotherham United	2–1	Cardiff City	Rotherham
15:00 BST	Odjidja-Ofoe 43' (pen.); Connolly 90+3' (o.g.)	Match Report	Marshall (red card) 43'; Whittingham 45+2' (pen.)	Stadium: AESSEAL New York Stadium; Attendance: 8935; Referee: Keith Hill

26 September 2015 9	Birmingham City	0–2	Rotherham United	Bordesley
15:00 BST		Match Report	Derbyshire 32'; Andreu 64'	Stadium: St Andrew's; Attendance: 17,307; Referee: Andy Woolmer

2 October 2015 10	Rotherham United	1–2	Burnley	Rotherham
19:45 BST	Ward 75'	Match Report	Gray 9'; Vokes 81'	Stadium: AESSEAL New York Stadium; Attendance: 9752; Referee: Peter Bankes

17 October 2015 11	Brentford	2–1	Rotherham United	Brentford
15:00 BST	Judge 2', 57'	Match Report	Mattock 46'	Stadium: Griffin Park; Attendance: 10,293; Referee: Iain Williamson

20 October 2015 12	Rotherham United	1–1	Reading	Rotherham
19:45 BST	Collins 48'	Match Report	Blackman 26'	Stadium: AESSEAL New York Stadium; Attendance: 9,071; Referee: Jeremy Simpson

23 October 2015 13	Rotherham United	1–2	Sheffield Wednesday	Rotherham
19:45 BST	Thorpe 90'	Match Report	João 46'; Forestieri 50'	Stadium: AESSEAL New York Stadium; Attendance: 11,658; Referee: Mike Jones

31 October 2015 14	Derby County	3–0	Rotherham United	Derby
15:00 GMT	Weimann 7'; Butterfield 45'; Keogh 76'	Match Report		Stadium: Pride Park Stadium; Attendance: 30,172; Referee: Scott Duncan

3 November 2015 15	Middlesbrough	1–0	Rotherham United	Middlesbrough
19:45 GMT	Downing 16'	Match Report		Stadium: Riverside Stadium; Attendance: 21,144; Referee: Paul Tierney

7 November 2015 16	Rotherham United	2–5	Ipswich Town	Rotherham
15:00 GMT	Barker 56'; Derbyshire 59'	Match Report	Pitman 8'; Douglas 22'; Murphy 43', 48', 72'	Stadium: AESSEAL New York Stadium; Attendance: 9162; Referee: Darren Drysdale

21 November 2015 17	Leeds United	0–1	Rotherham United	Leeds
15:00 GMT	Beradi (red card) 73'	Match Report	Newell 54'; Best (red card) 73'	Stadium: Elland Road; Attendance: 25,802; Referee: Keith Stroud

28 November 2015 18	Rotherham United	3–0	Bristol City	Rotherham
15:00 GMT	Clarke-Harris 9', 27' (pen.); Frecklington 75'	Match Report		Stadium: AESSEAL New York Stadium; Attendance: 8949; Referee: Tim Robinson

5 December 2015 19	Rotherham United	1–2	Wolverhampton Wanderers	Rotherham
15:00 GMT	Newell 17'	Match Report	Henry 5'; Batth 44'	Stadium: AESSEAL New York Stadium; Attendance: 9759; Referee: Darren Deadman

11 December 2015 20	Blackburn Rovers	1–0	Rotherham United	Blackburn
19:45 GMT	Hyam 30' (o.g.)	Match Report		Stadium: Ewood Park; Attendance: 13,054; Referee: Tony Harrington

15 December 2015 21	Huddersfield Town	2–0	Rotherham United	Huddersfield
19:45 GMT	Carayol 30'; Miller 73'	Match Report		Stadium: John Smith's Stadium; Attendance: 12,763; Referee: Mark Brown

19 December 2015 22	Rotherham United	2–0	Hull City	Rotherham
15:00 GMT	Frecklington 28' (pen.); Newell 57'	Match Report		Stadium: AESSEAL New York Stadium; Attendance: 10,355; Referee: Eddie Ilderton

26 December 2015 23	Rotherham United	4–0	Bolton Wanderers	Rotherham
15:00 GMT	G. Ward 56'; D. Ward 74'; Newell 80'; Clarke-Harris 86'	Match Report		Stadium: AESSEAL New York Stadium; Attendance: 11,315; Referee: Geoff Eltringham

29 December 2015 24	Fulham	4–1	Rotherham United	Fulham
19:45 GMT	Woodrow 6', 45'; Kačaniklić 59'; McCormack 69'	Match Report	Rawson 20'	Stadium: Craven Cottage; Attendance: 16,333; Referee: Simon Hooper

2 January 2016 25	Preston North End	2–1	Rotherham United	Preston
15:00 GMT	Doyle 64'; Clarke-Harris 90+3' (o.g.)	Match Report	Andreu 35'	Stadium: Deepdale; Attendance: 12,027; Referee: Charles Breakspear

12 January 2016 26	Rotherham United	2–0	Brighton & Hove Albion	Rotherham
19:45 GMT	D. Ward 45'; Derbyshire 86'			Stadium: AESSEAL New York Stadium; Attendance: 9,269; Referee: Oliver Langford

16 January 2016 27	Rotherham United	0–3	Queens Park Rangers	Rotherham
15:00 GMT		Match Report	Hoilett 52'; Phillips 54'; Polter 90'	Stadium: AESSEAL New York Stadium; Attendance: 9594; Referee: James Adcock

23 January 2016 28	Cardiff City	2–2	Rotherham United	Cardiff
15:00 GMT	Pilkington 25', 60'	Report	Newell 44'; Pilkington 49' (o.g.)	Stadium: Cardiff City Stadium; Attendance: 14885; Referee: Jeremy Simpson

30 January 2016 29	Rotherham United	1–4	Charlton Athletic	Rotherham
15:00 GMT	Burke 11'	Report	Makienok 4', 69'; Vetokele 44'; Lookman 90+4'	Stadium: AESSEAL New York Stadium; Attendance: 9227; Referee: Keith Stroud

6 February 2016 30	Bolton Wanderers	2–1	Rotherham United	Bolton
15:00 GMT	Spearing 2'; Wollery 90+2'	Report	Burke 43'	Stadium: Macron Stadium; Attendance: 14641; Referee: Stuart Attwell

13 February 2016 31	Rotherham United	0–0	Birmingham City	Rotherham
15:00 GMT	Mattock (yellow card) 39' (yellow-red card) 90+5'; Wood (yellow card) 53' (yellow-red card) 79'	Report	Kieftenbeld (yellow card) 55'; Gleeson (yellow card) 90'	Stadium: AESSEAL New York Stadium; Attendance: 11,018; Referee: Richard Clark

20 February 2016 32	Burnley	2–0	Rotherham United	Burnley
15:00 GMT	Vokes 57' (pen.); Gray (yellow card) 64'; Mee (yellow card) 68'; Arfield 86'	Report	Burke (yellow card) 20'; Smallwood (yellow card) 85'	Stadium: Turf Moor; Attendance: 15,849; Referee: Tim Robinson

23 February 2016 33	Reading	1–0	Rotherham United	Reading
20:00 GMT	Robson-Kanu 66'	Report		Stadium: Madejski Stadium; Attendance: 13,504; Referee: Kevin Johnson

27 February 2016 34	Rotherham United	2–1	Brentford	Rotherham
15:00 GMT	Derbyshire 29'; D. Ward 71'	Report	Judge 43'	Stadium: AESSEAL New York Stadium; Attendance: 8,534; Referee: Mark Brown

5 March 2016 35	Sheffield Wednesday	0–1	Rotherham United	Sheffield
15:00 GMT		Report	Derbyshire 21'	Stadium: Hillsborough; Attendance: 28,912; Referee: Chris Kavanagh

8 March 2016 36	Rotherham United	1–0	Middlesbrough	Rotherham
19:45 GMT	Frecklington 88'; Halford (yellow card) 85' (yellow-red card) 89'	Report		Stadium: AESSEAL New York Stadium; Attendance: 10,783; Referee: Peter Bankes

12 March 2016 37	Rotherham United	3–3	Derby County	Rotherham
15:00 GMT	D. Ward 83'; Best 85', 90+1'	Report	Ince 55', 65'; Martin 63'	Stadium: AESSEAL New York Stadium; Attendance: 11,163; Referee: David Webb

19 March 2016 38	Ipswich Town	0–1	Rotherham United	Ipswich
15:00 GMT		Report	Best 44'	Stadium: Portman Road; Attendance: 20,318; Referee: Steve Martin

2 April 2016 39	Rotherham United	2–1	Leeds United	Rotherham
15:00 BST	Frecklington 27'; Derbyshire (red card) 61'; Halford 89' (pen.)	Report	Murphy 79'; Silvestri (red card) 89'	Stadium: AESSEAL New York Stadium; Attendance: 11,418; Referee: Kevin Friend

5 April 2016 40	Bristol City	1–1	Rotherham United	Bristol
19:45 BST	Odemwingie 54'	Report	Derbyshire 12'	Stadium: Ashton Gate; Attendance: 15,248; Referee: Gavin Ward

9 April 2016 41	MK Dons	0–4	Rotherham United	Milton Keynes
15:00 BST		Report	Derbyshire 1'; Best 17' (pen.); Broadfoot 54'; Smallwood 79'	Stadium: Stadium mk Attendance: 13,048; Referee: Iain Williamson

16 April 2016 42	Rotherham United	0–0	Nottingham Forest	Rotherham
15:00 BST		Report		Stadium: AESSEAL New York Stadium; Attendance: 11,503; Referee: Simon Hooper

19 April 2016 43	Rotherham United	1–1	Huddersfield Town	Rotherham
19:45 BST	Halford 10'	Report	Wells 22'	Stadium: AESSEAL New York Stadium; Attendance: 10,292; Referee: Darren Drysdale

23 April 2016 44	Wolverhampton Wanderers	0–0	Rotherham United	Wolverhampton
15:00 BST		Match Report		Stadium: Molineux; Attendance: 18,757; Referee: Jeremy Simpson

30 April 2016 45	Rotherham United	0–1	Blackburn Rovers	Rotherham
15:00 BST		Report	Duffy 6'	Stadium: AESSEAL New York Stadium; Attendance: 11,035; Referee: Steve Martin

7 May 2016 46	Hull City	5–1	Rotherham United	Hull
12:30 BST	Snodgrass 25'; Hernández 27'; Livermore 40', 59'; Diamé 42'	Report	Frecklington 16'	Stadium: KC Stadium; Attendance: 18,670; Referee: Scott Duncan

=== FA Cup ===
On 7 December 2015, the draw for the third round of the FA Cup was made.

9 January 2016 Third round	Leeds United	2–0	Rotherham United	Leeds
15:00 GMT	Carayol 45'; Doukara 90'	Match Report		Stadium: Elland Road; Attendance: 16,039; Referee: Andy Woolmer

=== League Cup ===
On 16 June 2015, the first round draw for the League Cup was made.

11 August 2015 First round	Rotherham United	1–0	Cambridge United	Rotherham
19:45 BST	Bowery 45+1'	Match Report		Stadium: AESSEAL New York Stadium; Attendance: 4,568 (408); Referee: Chris Sarginson

25 August 2015 Second round	Rotherham United	1–2	Norwich City	Rotherham
19:45 BST	Green 80'	Report	Howson 22' van Wolfswinkel 68'	Stadium: AESSEAL New York Stadium; Attendance: 5,648; Referee: Kevin Wright

== Transfers ==
As of 22 February 2016

=== Transfers in ===
Date from	Position	Nationality	Name	From	Fee	Ref.
1 July 2015	LW	IRL	Aidan White	Leeds United (Note: White joins following his release from Leeds United.)	Free transfer	
1 July 2015	LB	ENG	Joe Mattock	Sheffield Wednesday (Note: Mattock joins following his release from Sheffield Wednesday.)	Free transfer	
1 July 2015	RB	ENG	Lewis Buxton	Sheffield Wednesday (Note: Buxton joins following his release from Sheffield Wednesday.)	Free transfer	
2 July 2015	AM	ARG	Emmanuel Ledesma	Middlesbrough (Note: Ledesma joins following his release from Middlesbrough.)	Free transfer	
3 July 2015	CB	WAL	Danny Collins	Nottingham Forest (Note: Collins joins following his release from Nottingham Forest.)	Free transfer	
3 July 2015	CB	ENG	Tom Thorpe	Manchester United (Note: Thorpe joins following his release from Manchester United.)	Free transfer	
6 July 2015	UT	ENG	Greg Halford	Nottingham Forest (Note: Halford joins following his release from Nottingham Forest)	Free transfer	
24 July 2015	CF	SCO	Chris Maguire	Sheffield Wednesday (Note: Maguire joins after rejecting a contract extension at Sheffield Wednesday.)	Free transfer	
5 August 2015	LM	ENG	Joe Newell	Peterborough United	Undisclosed	
1 September 2015	GK	NIR	Lee Camp	Bournemouth (Note: Camp joins following his release from Bournemouth.)	Free transfer	
16 November 2015	CF	IRL	Leon Best	Free agent	Free transfer	
19 November 2015	CB	IRL	Stephen Kelly	Free agent	Free transfer	
27 November 2015	CM	ENG	Simon Lenighan	Harrogate Town	Free transfer	
8 January 2016	CB	TUN	Aymen Belaïd	Levski Sofia	Free transfer	
8 January 2016	GK	ENG	Alex Cairns	Chesterfield (Note: Cairns joined following his release by Chesterfield)	Free transfer	
21 January 2016	CF	ARG	Luciano Becchio	Free agent	Free transfer	
28 January 2016	AM	WAL	Chris Dawson	Leeds United (Note: Dawson joined following his release by Leeds)	Free transfer	
17 February 2016	LW	ENG	Jerome Thomas	Free agent	Free transfer	
19 February 2016	GK	IRL	Paddy Kenny	Free agent	Free transfer	
19 February 2016	RB	JAM	Lloyd Doyley	Free agent	Free transfer	

=== Transfers out ===
Date from	Position	Nationality	Name	To	Fee	Ref.
1 July 2015	RWB	WAL	Mark Bradley	Free agent	Released	
1 July 2015	RWB	ENG	Richard Brindley	Colchester United (Note: Following Brindley's release he joined Colchester United.)	Free transfer	
1 July 2015	CM	ENG	Robert Milsom	Notts County (Note: Following Milsom's release he joined Notts County.)	Free transfer	
1 July 2015	LB	ENG	Mat Sadler	Shrewsbury Town (Note: Following Sadler's release he joined Shrewsbury Town.)	Free transfer	
1 July 2015	GK	ENG	Tony Thompson	Morecambe (Note: Following Thompson's release he joined Morecambe.)	Free transfer	
1 July 2015	CB	WAL	Craig Morgan	Wigan Athletic (Note: Following Morgan's rejection of a new contract he joined Wigan Athletic.)	Free transfer	
1 July 2015	LW	ENG	Ben Pringle	Fulham (Note: Following Pringle's rejection of a new contract he joined Fulham.)	Free transfer	
1 July 2015	CB	ENG	Daniel Rowe	Wycombe Wanderers	Compensation	
15 July 2015	CB	ISL	Kári Árnason	Malmö FF	Undisclosed	
15 July 2015	GK	ENG	Scott Loach	Notts County (Note: Following Loach's release he joined Notts County.)	Free transfer	
16 July 2015	CM	ENG	Conor Newton	Cambridge United (Note: Following Newton's release he joined Cambridge United.)	Free transfer	
8 January 2016	LB	ENG	Aidan White	Barnsley (Note: Following White's mutual contract termination, he joined Barnsley.)	Free transfer	
22 January 2016	CF	ENG	Jordan Bowery	Oxford United (Note: Following Bowery's contract termination, he joined Oxford.)	Free transfer	
1 February 2016	CF	SCO	Chris Maguire	Oxford United (Note: Following Maguire's contract termination, he joined Oxford.)	Free transfer	
4 February 2016	CM	ENG	Simon Lenighan	Free agent	Contract terminated	

=== Loans in ===
Date from	Position	Nationality	Name	From	Date until	Ref.
13 July 2015	AM	ENG	Grant Ward	Tottenham Hotspur	8 May 2016	
15 July 2015	CB	ENG	Farrend Rawson	Derby County	22 February 2016	
15 July 2015	GK	NED	Kelle Roos	Derby County	1 September 2015	
1 September 2015	CM	FRA	Tony Andreu	Norwich City	7 January 2016	
1 September 2015	RM	BEL	Vadis Odjidja-Ofoe	Norwich City	29 September 2015	
19 October 2015	LB	ENG	Harry Toffolo	Norwich City	16 January 2016	
7 November 2015	CM	ENG	Brandon Barker	Manchester City	15 December 2015	
26 November 2015	CM	ENG	Luke Hyam	Ipswich Town	22 December 2015	
2 January 2016	RB	ENG	Shay Facey	Manchester City	8 May 2016	
22 January 2016	RM	SCO	Chris Burke	Nottingham Forest	8 May 2016	
27 January 2016	AM	SCO	Andrew Shinnie	Birmingham City	8 May 2016	

=== Loans out ===
Date from	Position	Nationality	Name	To	Date until	Ref.
23 September 2015	CB	ENG	Richard Wood	Fleetwood Town	24 October 2015	
26 October 2015	CB	ENG	Richard Wood	Chesterfield	29 December 2015	
27 October 2015	CF	ENG	Jerry Yates	Harrogate Town	27 November 2015	
17 November 2015	LW	IRE	Aidan White	Barnsley	3 January 2016	
20 November 2015	CF	ENG	Jordan Bowery	Bradford City	2 January 2016	
26 November 2015	UT	ENG	Greg Halford	Birmingham City	2 January 2016	
26 November 2015	CF	SCO	Chris Maguire	Oxford United	18 January 2016	
27 November 2015	LB	ENG	Mason Warren	Sheffield F.C.	7 January 2016	
18 December 2015	CF	ENG	Jerry Yates	Harrogate Town	18 January 2016	
15 January 2016	GK	ENG	Adam Collin	Aberdeen	15 May 2016	
5 February 2016	LB	ENG	Mason Warren	Harrogate Town	3 April 2016	
21 March 2016	CB	ENG	Tom Thorpe	Bradford City	20 May 2016	
