= 2014–15 Rotherham United F.C. season =

Rotherham United F.C.
2014–15 season
- Chairman: Tony Stewart
- Manager: Steve Evans
- Stadium: AESSEAL New York Stadium
- Championship: 21st
- FA Cup: Third round (eliminated by Bournemouth)
- League Cup: Second round (eliminated by Swansea City)
Home colours	Away colours	Third colours

In the 2014–15 season, Rotherham United competed in the Sky Bet Championship. The club also took part in the annual League Cup and FA Cup.

== Competitions ==
=== Pre-season matches ===
12 July 2014	Greenock Morton	0–1	Rotherham United	Greenock, Scotland
15:00 BST		Report	Agard 28'	Stadium: Cappielow Park; Attendance: 598; Referee: Alan Newlands

18 July 2014	Falkirk	2–2	Rotherham United	Falkirk, Scotland
19:30 BST	Durojaiye 7'; Bia-Bi 90'	Report	Agard 22'; Newton 88'	Stadium: Falkirk Stadium; Attendance: 856; Referee: Calum Murray

19 July 2014	Queen of the South	5–1	Rotherham United	Dumfries, Scotland
15:00 BST	Baird 43', 62'; Lyle 68', 76'; Kidd 78'	Report	Rowe 4'	Stadium: Palmerston Park; Attendance: 689

23 July 2014	Rotherham United	1–0	Nottingham Forest	Rotherham, England
19:30 BST	Agard 65'	Report		Stadium: New York Stadium; Attendance: 3,600 (777); Referee: Jonathan Moss

26 July 2014	Tamworth	2–1	Rotherham United	Tamworth, England
15:00 BST	Jackson 4'; Tomlinson 49'	Report	Bowery 10'	Stadium: The Lamb Ground; Attendance: 470

29 July 2014	Alfreton Town	0–2	Rotherham United	Alfreton, England
19:30 BST		Report	Derbyshire 55'; Yates 90+1'	Stadium: Impact Arena; Attendance: 364; Referee: Richard Wigglesworth

2 August 2014	Doncaster Rovers	1–2	Rotherham United	Doncaster, England
15:00 BST	Main 82'	Report	Derbyshire 53'; Hall 57'	Stadium: Keepmoat Stadium; Referee: Mark Haywood

5 August 2014	Rotherham United	1–3	Leicester City	Rotherham, England
19:45 BST	Agard 59'	Report	Ulloa 29', 38'; Drinkwater 64'	Stadium: New York Stadium; Attendance: 3,714 (595); Referee: Carl Pawson

=== Championship ===
==== League table ====
Pos	Team	Pld	W	D	L	GF	GA	GD	Pts	Promotion, qualification or relegation
19	Reading	46	13	11	22	48	69	−21	50	
20	Brighton & Hove Albion	46	10	17	19	44	54	−10	47	
21	Rotherham United	46	11	16	19	46	67	−21	46 (Note: Rotherham United were deducted three points for fielding an ineligible player.)	
22	Millwall (R)	46	9	14	23	42	76	−34	41	Relegation to Football League One
23	Wigan Athletic (R)	46	9	12	25	39	64	−25	39	Relegation to Football League One

Updated to match(es) played on 2 May 2015. Source: Sky Sports
Rules for classification: 1) Points; 2) Goal difference; 3) Number of goals scored
(R) Relegated

==== Matches ====
9 August 2014 1	Derby County	1–0	Rotherham United	Derby
15:00 BST	Hendrick 82'	Match Report		Stadium: Pride Park Stadium; Attendance: 30,105; Referee: Kevin Friend

16 August 2014 2	Rotherham United	1–0	Wolverhampton Wanderers	Rotherham
15:00 BST	Hall 76'	Match Report		Stadium: New York Stadium; Attendance: 10,752; Referee: Graham Salisbury

19 August 2014 3	Rotherham United	0–2	Watford	Rotherham
19:45 BST		Match Report	Lloyd Dyer 74'; Gianni Munari 87'	Stadium: New York Stadium; Attendance: 9,361; Referee: David Webb

23 August 2014 4	Millwall	0–1	Rotherham United	London
15:00 BST		Match Report	Pringle 49'	Stadium: The Den; Attendance: 10,282; Referee: Paul Tierney

30 August 2014 5	Rotherham United	0–2	Brentford	Rotherham
15:00 BST		Match Report	Gray 45+1'; Proschwitz 90+7'	Stadium: New York Stadium; Attendance: 9,016 (611 away); Referee: Stuart Attwell

13 September 2014 6	Bournemouth	1–1	Rotherham United	Bournemouth
15:00 BST	Cook 60'	Match Report	Bowery 90+3'	Stadium: Goldsands Stadium; Attendance: 8,480 (492 away); Referee: Graham Horwood

16 September 2014 7	Bolton Wanderers	3–2	Rotherham United	Bolton
20:00 BST	Mason 60', 80', 84'	Match Report	Wordsworth 33'; Bowery 82'	Stadium: Macron Stadium; Attendance: 13,630; Referee: Neil Swarbrick

20 September 2014 8	Rotherham United	1–1	Charlton Athletic	Rotherham
15:00 BST	Becchio 70'	Match Report	Guðmundsson 27'	Stadium: New York Stadium; Attendance: 9,620; Referee: Darren Deadman

27 September 2014 9	Ipswich Town	2–0	Rotherham United	Ipswich
15:00 BST	Murphy 3'; McGoldrick 6'	Match Report		Stadium: Portman Road; Attendance: 16,447; Referee: Lee Collins

30 September 2014 10	Rotherham United	2–0	Blackburn Rovers	Rotherham
19:45 BST	Árnason 5'; Becchio 32'	Match Report		Stadium: New York Stadium; Attendance: 9,525 (1,305 away); Referee: Simon Hooper

4 October 2014 11	Norwich City	1–1	Rotherham United	Norwich
15:00 BST	Jerome 77'	Match Report	Green 44' (pen.)	Stadium: Carrow Road; Attendance: 26,114; Referee: Phil Gibbs

17 October 2014 12	Rotherham United	2–1	Leeds United	Rotherham
19:45 BST	Revell 58'; Clarke-Harris 65'	Match Report	Antenucci 30'	Stadium: New York Stadium; Attendance: 11,350; Referee: Keith Stroud

21 October 2014 15	Rotherham United	3–3	Fulham	Rotherham
15:00 BST	Revell 28'; Clarke-Harris 55'; Bodurov 86' (o.g.)	Report	McCormack 33' (pen.); Woodrow 58'; Burn 90'	Stadium: New York Stadium; Attendance: 8,981; Referee: Mark Brown

25 October 2014 14	Brighton & Hove Albion	1–1	Rotherham United	Brighton
15:00 BST	Bennett 45+1'	Match Report	Revell 48'	Stadium: Falmer Stadium; Attendance: 24,370; Referee: Michael Bull

1 November 2014 15	Rotherham United	0–3	Middlesbrough	Rotherham
15:00 GMT	Bowery (red card) 30'	Match Report	Bamford 8'; Wildschut 19'; Tomlin 87'	Stadium: New York Stadium; Attendance: 11,282; Referee: Mick Russell

4 November 2014 16	Reading	3–0	Rotherham United	Reading
19:45 GMT	Mackie 29'; Cox 55', 64'	Match Report		Stadium: Madjeski Stadium; Attendance: 13,775; Referee: Pat Miller

8 November 2014 17	Sheffield Wednesday	0–0	Rotherham United	Sheffield
15:00 GMT		Match Report		Stadium: Hillsborough; Attendance: 26,986; Referee: Nigel Miller

22 November 2014 18	Rotherham United	0–1	Birmingham City	Rotherham
15:00 GMT		Match Report	Donaldson 62'	Stadium: New York Stadium; Attendance: 10,937; Referee: Darren Bond

29 November 2014 19	Rotherham United	1–1	Blackpool	Rotherham
15:00 GMT	Bowery 78'	Match Report	Davies 85'	Stadium: New York Stadium; Attendance: 9,381; Referee: Tony Harrington

6 December 2014 20	Cardiff City	0–0	Rotherham United	Cardiff
15:00 GMT		Match Report		Stadium: Cardiff City Stadium; Attendance: 20,419; Referee: Andy D'Urso

13 December 2014 21	Rotherham United	0–0	Nottingham Forest	Rotherham
15:00 GMT		Match Report		Stadium: New York Stadium; Attendance: 11,228; Referee: Richard Clark

20 December 2014 22	Wigan Athletic	1–2	Rotherham United	Wigan
15:00 GMT	Watson 64'	Match Report	Lawrence 40'	Stadium: DW Stadium; Attendance: 12,641; Referee: Keith Stroud

26 December 2014 23	Rotherham United	2–2	Huddersfield Town	Rotherham
15:00 GMT	Clarke-Harris 88'; Frecklington 90'	Match Report	Vaughan 35'; Coady 61'	Stadium: New York Stadium; Attendance: 11,681; Referee: Mark Haywood

28 December 2014 24	Blackpool	1–1	Rotherham United	Blackpool
15:00 GMT	Telford 84'	Match Report	Ledesma 57'	Stadium: Bloomfield Road; Attendance: 11,623; Referee: Scott Duncan

10 January 2015 25	Brentford	1–0	Rotherham United	Brentford
15:00 GMT	Dallas 57'	Match Report		Stadium: Griffin Park; Attendance: 10,851; Referee: Paul Tierney

17 January 2015 26	Rotherham United	0–2	Bournemouth	Rotherham
15:00 GMT		Match Report	Elphick 45+2'; Wilson 62'	Stadium: New York Stadium; Attendance: 9,157; Referee: Phil Gibbs

27 January 2015 27	Rotherham United	4–2	Bolton Wanderers	Rotherham
19:45 GMT	Pringle 2'; Sammon 23'; Green 44'; Derbyshire 57'	Match Report	Trotter 77'; Mills 79'	Stadium: New York Stadium; Attendance: 8,760; Referee: Darren Drysdale

31 January 2015 28	Charlton Athletic	1–1	Rotherham United	London
15:00 GMT	Cousins 83'	Match Report	Ward 90+1'	Stadium: The Valley; Attendance: 14,447; Referee: Scott Duncan

7 February 2015 29	Rotherham United	2–0	Ipswich Town	Rotherham
15:00 GMT	Derbyshire 38'; Sammon 64'	Match Report		Stadium: New York Stadium; Attendance: 10,336; Referee: Gavin Ward

10 February 2015 30	Blackburn Rovers	2–1	Rotherham United	Blackburn
19:45 GMT	Conway 41'; Rhodes 86'	Match Report	Derbyshire 72'	Stadium: Ewood Park; Attendance: 13,403; Referee: Geoff Eltringham

17 February 2015 31	Rotherham United	3–3	Derby County	Rotherham
19:45 GMT	Green 35'; Smallwood 49'; Derbyshire 54'	Match Report	Ince 36', 64'; Bent 83'	Stadium: New York Stadium; Attendance: 11,035; Referee: Nigel Miller

21 February 2015 32	Wolverhampton Wanderers	5–0	Rotherham United	Wolverhampton
15:00 GMT	Afobe 21', 63'; Dicko 28'; Edwards 74'; Sako 80'	Match Report		Stadium: Molineux; Attendance: 20,336; Referee: Iain Williamson

24 February 2015 33	Watford	3–0	Rotherham United	Watford
19:45 GMT	Ighalo 18', 56'; Deeney 54'	Match Report		Stadium: Vicarage Road; Attendance: 13,468; Referee: Andy Davies

28 February 2015 34	Rotherham United	2–1	Millwall	Rotherham
15:00 GMT	Ward 47'; Árnason 85'	Match Report	Woolford 20'	Stadium: New York Stadium; Attendance: 10,329; Referee: Gary Sutton

3 March 2015 35	Rotherham United	1–3	Cardiff City	Rotherham
19:45 GMT	Ward 80'	Match Report	Ecuele Manga 24'; Macheda 26'; McAleny 35'	Stadium: New York Stadium; Attendance: 8,534; Referee: James Adcock

7 March 2015 36	Huddersfield Town	0–2	Rotherham United	Huddersfield
15:00 GMT		Match Report	Árnason (yellow card) 25' (goal) 44'; Frecklington (yellow card) 34' (yellow-red card) 74'; Sammon 60'	Stadium: John Smith's Stadium; Attendance: 13,342; Referee: Carl Boyeson

14 March 2015 37	Rotherham United	1–2	Wigan Athletic	Rotherham
15:00 GMT	Derbyshire 45'	Match Report	Pennant 31', 36'	Stadium: New York Stadium; Attendance: 10,062; Referee: James Linington

18 March 2015 38	Nottingham Forest	2–0	Rotherham United	Nottingham
19:45 GMT	Blackstock 43'; Antonio 45'	Match Report		Stadium: City Ground; Attendance: 20,569; Referee: Michael Bull

21 March 2015 39	Rotherham United	2–3	Sheffield Wednesday	Rotherham
15:15 GMT	Pringle 57'; Bowery 88'	Match Report	Mattock (yellow card) 20'; Hutchinson (yellow card) 44'; Lavery 86'; Lee 90+6'; Nuhiu 90+2'	Stadium: New York Stadium; Attendance: 11,707; Referee: Oliver Langford

3 April 2015 40	Birmingham City	2–1	Rotherham United	Birmingham
19:45 BST	Tesche 27'; Donaldson 43'	Match Report	Derbyshire 48'	Stadium: St Andrews; Attendance: 16,569; Referee: Dean Whitestone

6 April 2015 41	Rotherham United	1–0	Brighton and Hove Albion	Rotherham
15:00 BST	Derbyshire 8'	Match Report		Stadium: New York Stadium; Attendance: 9.872; Referee: Kevin Wright

11 April 2015 42	Middlesbrough	2–0	Rotherham United	Middlesbrough
15:00 BST	Tomlin 50'; Bamford 66'	Match Report		Stadium: Riverside; Attendance: 19,537; Referee: Iain Williamson

15 April 2015 43	Fulham	1–1	Rotherham United	London
19:45 BST	McCormack 67'	Match Report	Derbyshire 4'	Stadium: Craven Cottage; Attendance: 15,011; Referee: Andy Davies

25 April 2015 44	Rotherham United	1–1	Norwich City	Rotherham
15:00 BST	Bowery 86'	Match Report	Grabban (red card) 25'; Hooper 59'	Stadium: New York Stadium; Attendance: 11,498; Referee: Mark Brown

28 April 2015 45	Rotherham United	2–1	Reading	Rotherham
19:45 BST	Derbyshire 52'; Frecklington 58'	Match Report	Norwood 88'	Stadium: New York Stadium; Attendance: 11,123; Referee: Graham Salisbury

2 May 2015 46	Leeds United	0–0	Rotherham United	Leeds
12:30 BST		Match Report		Stadium: Elland Road; Attendance: 31,850; Referee: Andy D'Urso

=== FA Cup ===
3 January 2015 Third round	Rotherham United	1–5	Bournemouth	Rotherham
15:00 GMT	Brindley 10'	Match Report	MacDonald 44'; Stanislas 58'; Fraser 63'; Kermorgant 67', 71'; Smith	Stadium: New York Stadium; Attendance: 5,875; Referee: Neil Swarbrick

=== League Cup ===
The draw for the first round was made on 17 June 2014 at 10am. Rotherham were drawn at home to Fleetwood Town.

12 August 2014 Round One	Rotherham United	1–0 (a.e.t.)	Fleetwood Town	Rotherham
19:45 BST	Derbyshire 109' (pen.)	Match Report		Stadium: New York Stadium; Attendance: 4,487 (143); Referee: Nigel Miller

26 August 2014 Round Two	Swansea City	1–0	Rotherham United	Swansea
19:45 BST	Gomis 22'	Match Report		Stadium: Liberty Stadium; Referee: Stephen Martin

== Transfers ==
Players transferred in
Date	Pos.	Name	Previous club	Fee	Ref.
23 May 2014	MF	(England) Conor Newton	(England) Newcastle United	Free	
30 May 2014	FW	(England) Matt Derbyshire	(England) Nottingham Forest	Free	
5 June 2014	GK	(England) Scott Loach	(England) Ipswich Town	Free	
9 June 2014	DF	(Scotland) Kirk Broadfoot	(England) Blackpool	Free	
10 June 2014	FW	(England) Jordan Bowery	(England) Aston Villa	Undisclosed	
17 June 2014	DF	(England) Mat Sadler	(England) Crawley Town	Free	
26 June 2014	MF	(England) Ryan Hall	(England) Milton Keynes Dons	Free	
26 June 2014	DF	(England) Richard Wood	(England) Charlton Athletic	Free	
27 June 2014	FW	(England) Febian Brandy	(England) Sheffield United	Free	
27 June 2014	DF	(England) Frazer Richardson	(England) Middlesbrough	Free	
30 June 2014	MF	(Republic of Ireland) Paul Green	(England) Leeds United	Free	
22 August 2014	MF	(England) Richard Smallwood	(England) Middlesbrough	Undisclosed	
1 September 2014	FW	(England) Jonson Clarke-Harris	(England) Oldham Athletic	Undisclosed	
Players transferred out
Date	Pos.	Name	To	Fee	Ref.
16 May 2014	MF	(Wales) Nicky Adams	(England) Bury	Undisclosed	
28 May 2014	MF	(England) Lionel Ainsworth	(Scotland) Motherwell	Released	
28 May 2014	DF	(Jamaica) Claude Davis	Free agent	Released	
28 May 2014	MF	(Scotland) David Noble	(England) Oldham Athletic	Released	
28 May 2014	FW	(Nigeria) Kayode Odejayi	(England) Tranmere Rovers	Released	
28 May 2014	MF	(Northern Ireland) Michael O'Connor	(England) Port Vale	Released	
28 May 2014	MF	(England) Danny Schofield	(England) FC Halifax Town	Released	
28 May 2014	GK	(Scotland) Scott Shearer	(England) Crewe Alexandra	Released	
6 June 2014	FW	(England) Danny Hylton	(England) Oxford United	Free	
11 June 2014	FW	(England) Wes Thomas	(England) Birmingham City	Free	
22 July 2014	MF	(England) David Worrall	(England) Southend United	Free	
21 August 2014	FW	(England) Kieran Agard	(England) Bristol City	Undisclosed	
9 January 2015	MF	(England) Febian Brandy	(England) Rochdale	Free	
9 January 2015	FW	(England) Alex Revell	(Wales) Cardiff City	Undisclosed	
24 January 2015	DF	(England) Joe Skarz	(England) Oxford United	Free	
31 January 2015	MF	(England) Ryan Hall	(England) Luton Town	Free	
Players loaned in
Date from	Pos.	Name	From	Date to	Ref.
1 August 2014	MF	(England) John Swift	(England) Chelsea	14 November 2014	
14 August 2014	FW	(England) Paul Taylor	(England) Ipswich Town	January 2015	
19 August 2014	MF	(England) Richard Smallwood	(England) Middlesbrough	22 August 2014	
22 August 2014	MF	(England) Anthony Wordsworth	(England) Ipswich Town	2 January 2015	
1 September 2014	FW	(Argentina) Luciano Becchio	(England) Norwich City	1 January 2015	
22 November 2014	MF	(Argentina) Emmanuel Ledesma	(England) Middlesbrough	20 December 2014	
26 November 2014	DF	(England) Reece James	(England) Manchester United	10 January 2015	
27 November 2014	MF	(Wales) Tom Lawrence	(England) Leicester City	30 December 2014	
27 November 2014	DF	(England) Scott Wootton	(England) Leeds United	5 January 2015	
8 January 2015	MF	(England) Jack Barmby	(England) Leicester City	3 May 2015	
9 January 2015	MF	(England) Danny Ward	(England) Huddersfield Town	3 May 2015	
9 January 2015	MF	(England) Adam Hammill	(England) Huddersfield Town	3 May 2015	
15 January 2015	FW	(Republic of Ireland) Conor Sammon	(England) Derby County	3 May 2015	
15 January 2015	DF	(England) Zeki Fryers	(England) Crystal Palace	3 May 2015	
30 January 2015	DF	(England) Jack Hunt	(England) Crystal Palace	2 May 2015	
5 March 2015	DF	(Northern Ireland) Daniel Lafferty	(England) Burnley	2 April 2015	
7 March 2015	DF	(England) Farrend Rawson	(England) Derby County	4 April 2015	
20 March 2015	DF	(England) Lawrie Wilson	(England) Charlton Athletic	30 June 2015	
20 March 2015	GK	(Argentina) Emiliano Martínez	(England) Arsenal	30 June 2015	
Players loaned out
Date from	Pos.	Name	To	Date to	Ref.
31 July 2014	MF	(England) Nicky Walker	(England) Wycombe Wanderers	4 November 2014	
31 July 2014	DF	(England) Daniel Rowe	(England) Wycombe Wanderers	2 November 2014	
31 July 2014	MF	(England) Mitch Rose	(England) Crawley Town	7 October 2014	
1 September 2014	MF	(Scotland) Michael Tidser	(England) Oldham Athletic	January 2015	
11 September 2014	DF	(England) Mat Sadler	(England) Crawley Town	11 November 2014	
17 September 2014	FW	(England) Febian Brandy	(England) Crewe Alexandra	25 November 2014	
16 October 2014	GK	(England) Tony Thompson	(England) Chelmsford City	13 November 2014	
18 October 2014	DF	(England) Daniel Rowe	(England) Wycombe Wanderers	3 May 2015	
10 November 2014	GK	(England) Scott Loach	(England) Bury	1 December 2014	
25 November 2014	DF	(England) Richard Brindley	(England) Scunthorpe United	3 January 2015	
26 November 2014	MF	(England) Robert Milsom	(England) Bury	10 January 2015	
27 November 2014	MF	(England) Ryan Hall	(England) Notts County	5 January 2015	
28 November 2014	MF	(England) Nicky Walker	(England) Grimsby Town	31 December 2014	
15 January 2015	GK	(England) Scott Loach	(England) Peterborough United	16 February 2015	
16 January 2015	FW	(England) Jonson Clarke-Harris	(England) Milton Keynes Dons	14 February 2015	
29 January 2015	DF	(England) Richard Brindley	(England) Oxford United	29 February 2015	
20 February 2015	DF	(England) Richard Wood	(England) Crawley Town	30 June 2015	
3 March 2015	GK	(England) Scott Loach	(England) Yeovil Town	4 April 2015	
12 March 2015	FW	(England) Jonson Clarke-Harris	(England) Doncaster Rovers	30 June 2015	
13 March 2015	DF	(England) Mat Sadler	(England) Oldham Athletic	12 April 2015	
26 March 2015	GK	(England) Tony Thompson	(England) Southport	30 June 2015	
26 March 2015	DF	(England) Richard Brindley	(England) Colchester United	30 June 2015	
