= 2013–14 Rotherham United F.C. season =

Rotherham United
2013–14 Football League One season
- Chairman: Tony Stewart
- Manager: Steve Evans
- Stadium: New York Stadium; Rotherham
- League One: 4th (gained promotion through playoffs)
- Football League Cup: Second round
- FA Cup: Second round proper
- Football League Trophy: Northern Area Semi Final
- Top goalscorer: League: Kieran Agard (16); All: Kieran Agard (18)
- Highest home attendance: League: 11,758 vs Sheffield United; All: 11,758 vs Sheffield United
- Lowest home attendance: League: 8,534 vs Shrewsbury Town; All: 7,234 vs Shrewsbury Town
| Home colours | Away colours |

In the 2013–14 season, Rotherham United competed in League One, after a late surge in the closing stages of League Two (resulting in them being the first team to win five consecutive matches that season), saw them finishing second, behind Gillingham, and ahead of Port Vale - whom spent all season in the top two. The club also took part in the annual Capital One Cup and FA Cup, and spent another season in the lower tier tournament, the Johnstones Paint Trophy. United commenced the season under the retained management of Steve Evans, alongside assistant Paul Raynor. They went into the season as decent favourites for promotion, as well as contenders for the Johnstones Paint Trophy.

Due to the promotion, Rotherham were playing against South Yorkshire rivals Sheffield United, whom hadn't played against each other in the league for years. One other local team to join Rotherham in League One was Bradford City, who were beaten twice last season by the Millers - one being a 4–0 thrashing at the New York Stadium. Another notable fixture that took place was a home tie in the first round of the Capital One Cup against South Yorkshire rivals Sheffield Wednesday, whom they famously beat 2–1.

Also, prior to the start of the season, the club continued to show its fulfilment to huge bonds with the community, collecting the 2013 Family Excellence Award.

The captain for the season was Welsh defender Craig Morgan, who wore the number 20 shirt for the Millers.

During this season they collected 86 points scoring 86 goals (the 2nd highest of any League 1 team) while conceding 58 goals (joint 9th best. They came fourth in the league and subsequently featured in the League 1 playoffs. They beat Preston in the Playoffs semi finals 4–2 on aggregate and faced Leyton Orient in the final. After 90 minutes it was 2–2 and it went to penalties. Rotherham had gone behind 2–1 on penalties but came back to win 4–3 on penalties to gain promotion to the Championship. They featured in the 2014–15 Football League Championship next season.

== Squad statistics ==
=== Current squad ===
Note: Flags indicate national team as defined under FIFA eligibility rules; some limited exceptions apply. Players may hold more than one non-FIFA nationality.

| No. | Pos. | Nation | Player |
|---|---|---|---|
| 1 | GK | SCO | Scott Shearer |
| 2 | DF | ENG | Richard Brindley |
| 3 | DF | ENG | Joe Skarz |
| 4 | DF | ISL | Kári Árnason |
| 5 | DF | JAM | Claude Davis |
| 8 | MF | IRL | Lee Frecklington |
| 9 | FW | ENG | Alex Revell |
| 10 | MF | NIR | Michael O'Connor |
| 14 | DF | WAL | Mark Bradley |
| 15 | MF | ENG | Robert Milsom |
| 18 | MF | ENG | Ben Pringle |
| 20 | DF | WAL | Craig Morgan |

| No. | Pos. | Nation | Player |
|---|---|---|---|
| 21 | GK | ENG | Adam Collin |
| 22 | FW | ENG | Kieran Agard |
| 24 | MF | ENG | Mitch Rose |
| 25 | FW | ENG | Tom Eaves (on loan from Bolton Wanderers) |
| 26 | FW | ENG | Wes Thomas |
| 27 | DF | ENG | James Tavernier |
| 28 | FW | SVN | Haris Vučkić (on loan from Newcastle United) |
| 30 | GK | ENG | Tony Thompson |
| 35 | FW | ENG | Tom Hitchcock (on loan from Queens Park Rangers) |
| 36 | MF | ENG | Richie Smallwood |
| 37 | MF | ENG | Nicky Adams |
| — | MF | ENG | Danny Schofield |

=== Appearances and goals ===
As of 3 August 2013

| No. | Pos. | Nat. | Name | Total | | League One | | Capital One Cup | | FA Cup | | Johnstone's Paint Trophy | | Discipline | |
| No. | Pos. | Nat. | Name | Apps | Goals | Apps | Goals | Apps | Goals | Apps | Goals | Apps | Goals | Yellow card | Red card |
|---|---|---|---|---|---|---|---|---|---|---|---|---|---|---|---|
| 1 | GK | (Scotland) | Scott Shearer | 5 | 0 | 4 | 0 | 1 | 0 | 0 | 0 | 0 | 0 | 0 | 0 |
| 21 | GK | (England) | Adam Collin | 0 | 0 | 0 | 0 | 0 | 0 | 0 | 0 | 0 | 0 | 0 | 0 |
| 2 | DF | (England) | Richard Brindley | 1 | 0 | 1 | 0 | 0 | 0 | 0 | 0 | 0 | 0 | 1 | 0 |
| 3 | DF | (England) | Joe Skarz | 5 | 0 | 4 | 0 | 1 | 0 | 0 | 0 | 0 | 0 | 2 | 0 |
| 4 | DF | (Iceland) | Kári Árnason | 5 | 0 | 4 | 0 | 1 | 0 | 0 | 0 | 0 | 0 | 1 | 0 |
| 5 | DF | (Jamaica) | Claude Davis | 1 | 0 | 1 | 0 | 0 | 0 | 0 | 0 | 0 | 0 | 0 | 0 |
| 6 | DF | (England) | Pablo Mills | 0 | 0 | 0 | 0 | 0 | 0 | 0 | 0 | 0 | 0 | 0 | 0 |
| 14 | DF | (Wales) | Mark Bradley | 4 | 0 | 3 | 0 | 1 | 0 | 0 | 0 | 0 | 0 | 0 | 0 |
| 20 | DF | (Wales) | Craig Morgan (C) | 5 | 0 | 4 | 0 | 1 | 0 | 0 | 0 | 0 | 0 | 2 | 0 |
| 7 | MF | (England) | David Worrall | 1+3 | 1 | 1+2 | 1 | 0+1 | 0 | 0 | 0 | 0 | 0 | 0 | 0 |
| 8 | MF | (Republic of Ireland) | Lee Frecklington | 5 | 3 | 4 | 2 | 1 | 1 | 0 | 0 | 0 | 0 | 0 | 0 |
| 10 | MF | (Northern Ireland) | Michael O'Connor | 5 | 0 | 4 | 0 | 1 | 0 | 0 | 0 | 0 | 0 | 2 | 0 |
| 15 | MF | (England) | Robert Milsom | 0+1 | 0 | 0+1 | 0 | 0 | 0 | 0 | 0 | 0 | 0 | 0 | 0 |
| 18 | MF | (England) | Ben Pringle | 5 | 2 | 4 | 1 | 1 | 1 | 0 | 0 | 0 | 0 | 0 | 0 |
| 19 | MF | (Scotland) | David Noble | 0+1 | 0 | 0+1 | 0 | 0 | 0 | 0 | 0 | 0 | 0 | 0 | 0 |
| 23 | MF | (Scotland) | Michael Tidser | 0+2 | 0 | 0+1 | 0 | 0+1 | 0 | 0 | 0 | 0 | 0 | 0 | 0 |
| 24 | MF | (England) | Mitch Rose | 0 | 0 | 0 | 0 | 0 | 0 | 0 | 0 | 0 | 0 | 0 | 0 |
| 29 | MF | (England) | Nicky Walker | 0 | 0 | 0 | 0 | 0 | 0 | 0 | 0 | 0 | 0 | 0 | 0 |
| 9 | FW | (England) | Alex Revell | 5 | 0 | 4 | 0 | 1 | 0 | 0 | 0 | 0 | 0 | 1 | 0 |
| 11 | FW | (England) | Danny Hylton | 0 | 0 | 0 | 0 | 0 | 0 | 0 | 0 | 0 | 0 | 0 | 0 |
| 16 | FW | (England) | Matthew Tubbs | 4+1 | 0 | 3+1 | 0 | 1 | 0 | 0 | 0 | 0 | 0 | 2 | 0 |
| 17 | FW | (Wales) | Daniel Nardiello | 1 | 1 | 1 | 1 | 0 | 0 | 0 | 0 | 0 | 0 | 0 | 1 |
| 22 | FW | (England) | Kieran Agard | 3+1 | 1 | 2+1 | 1 | 1 | 0 | 0 | 0 | 0 | 0 | 2 | 0 |
| 23 | FW | (England) | Tom Eaves | 0 | 0 | 0 | 0 | 0 | 0 | 0 | 0 | 0 | 0 | 0 | 0 |

- (starts) + (substitute apps)

=== Goalscorers ===
As of 9 October 2013

| Place | Position | Nation | Number | Name | League One | FA Cup | Capital One Cup | Johnstones Paint Trophy | Total |
|---|---|---|---|---|---|---|---|---|---|
| 1 | MF | (Republic of Ireland) | 8 | Lee Frecklington | 2 | 0 | 1 | 0 | 3 |
| 2 | MF | (England) | 18 | Ben Pringle | 1 | 0 | 1 | 0 | 2 |
| 3 | FW | (England) | 22 | Kieran Agard | 1 | 0 | 0 | 0 | 1 |
| = | MF | (England) | 7 | David Worrall | 1 | 0 | 0 | 0 | 1 |
| = | FW | (England) | 9 | Alex Revell | 1 | 0 | 0 | 0 | 1 |
| = | FW | (England) | 17 | Daniel Nardiello | 1 | 0 | 0 | 0 | 1 |

== Pre–season ==
| 6 July 2013 Friendly | Parkgate | 0–2 | Rotherham United | Roundwood Sports Complex |
| 14:00 | | Match Analysis | Nardiello 63', 76' |

| 9 July 2013 Friendly | Greenock Morton | 0–0 | Rotherham United | Cappielow Park |
| 19:45 | | Match Analysis |

| 10 July 2013 Friendly | Livingston | 0–2 | Rotherham United | Almondvale Stadium |
| 15:00 | | Match Analysis | Bradley 7'; Rose 81' |

| 13 July 2013 Friendly | Ayr United | 1–4 | Rotherham United | Somerset Park |
| 15:00 | Moffat 81' | Match Analysis | Revell 52', 68'; Rose 76'; Pringle 87' |

| 16 July 2013 Friendly | Rotherham United | 2–1 | Bolton Wanderers | New York Stadium |
| 19:45 | Revell 63'; Nardiello 87' | Match Analysis | Sordell 42' |

| 17 July 2013 Friendly | Ilkeston | 0–4 | Rotherham United | New Manor Ground |
| 15:00 | | Match Analysis | Agard 38'; Walker 48', 83'; Milsom 57' |

| 20 July 2013 Friendly | Rotherham United | 0–1 | Huddersfield Town | New York Stadium |
| 15:00 | | Match Analysis | Paterson 89' |

| 23 July 2013 Friendly | Rotherham United | 2–3 | Middlesbrough | New York Stadium |
| 19:30 | O'Connor 17' (pen.); Revell 18' | Match Analysis | Gibson 15'; Haroun 44'; Jutkiewicz 57' |

== Competitions ==
=== League One ===
On 19 June 2013, the fixtures for the forthcoming season were announced.

==== League table ====
| Pos | Team | Pld | W | D | L | GF | GA | GD | Pts | Promotion, qualification or relegation |
|---|---|---|---|---|---|---|---|---|---|---|
| 2 | Brentford (P) | 46 | 28 | 10 | 8 | 72 | 43 | +29 | 94 | Promotion to Football League Championship |
| 3 | Leyton Orient | 46 | 25 | 11 | 10 | 85 | 45 | +40 | 86 | Qualification for League One play-offs (Note: Four teams play for one spot and promotion to Football League Championship.) |
| 4 | Rotherham United (O, P) | 46 | 24 | 14 | 8 | 86 | 58 | +28 | 86 | Qualification for League One play-offs |
| 5 | Preston North End | 46 | 23 | 16 | 7 | 72 | 46 | +26 | 85 | Qualification for League One play-offs |
| 6 | Peterborough United | 46 | 23 | 5 | 18 | 72 | 58 | +14 | 74 | Qualification for League One play-offs |

Updated to match(es) played on 3 May 2014. Source: BBC Sport
Rules for classification: 1) Points; 2) Goal difference; 3) Number of goals scored
(O) Play-off winners; (P) Promoted

==== Results summary ====
| Overall | | | | | | | | Home | | | | | | Away | | | | | |
| Pld | W | D | L | GF | GA | GD | Pts | W | D | L | GF | GA | GD | W | D | L | GF | GA | GD |
|---|---|---|---|---|---|---|---|---|---|---|---|---|---|---|---|---|---|---|---|
| 46 | 24 | 14 | 8 | 86 | 58 | +28 | 86 | 10 | 10 | 3 | 44 | 30 | +14 | 14 | 4 | 5 | 42 | 28 | +14 |

Last updated: 2 May 2016.

==== Matchday summary ====
| Matchday | 1 | 2 | 3 | 4 | 5 | 6 | 7 | 8 | 9 | 10 | 11 | 12 | 13 | 14 | 15 | 16 | 17 | 18 | 19 | 20 | 21 | 22 | 23 | 24 | 25 | 26 | 27 | 28 | 29 | 30 | 31 | 32 | 33 | 34 | 35 | 36 | 37 | 38 | 39 | 40 | 41 | 42 | 43 | 44 | 45 | 46 |
|---|---|---|---|---|---|---|---|---|---|---|---|---|---|---|---|---|---|---|---|---|---|---|---|---|---|---|---|---|---|---|---|---|---|---|---|---|---|---|---|---|---|---|---|---|---|---|
| Ground | A | H | A | H | A | H | H | A | H | A | H | A | H | A | H | A | H | A | H | A | H | A | A | H | H | A | H | A | H | H | A | A | H | A | A | H | A | H | H | A | A | H | A | H | H | A |
| Result | D | D | W | D | W | W | W | D | L | W | L | L | D | L | D | W | D | W | W | W | D | W | L | L | W | W | D | W | W | W | W | D | W | D | W | D | W | W | W | W | L | D | L | W | D | W |
| Position | 8 | 13 | 7 | 9 | 5 | 4 | 4 | 5 | 7 | 6 | 6 | 10 | 9 | 10 | 10 | 7 | 10 | 7 | 6 | 6 | 6 | 6 | 6 | 6 | 5 | 5 | 5 | 5 | 5 | 5 | 5 | 5 | 5 | 5 | 5 | 5 | 4 | 4 | 4 | 3 | 3 | 3 | 4 | 3 | 5 | 4 |

A = Away; H = Home; W = Win; D = Draw; L = Loss

==== Fixtures ====
| 3 August 2013 1 | Crewe Alexandra | 3–3 | Rotherham United | Alexandra Stadium |
| 15:00 | Grant 3'; Clayton 9'; Davis 47' (pen.) | Report | Frecklington (2) 10', 90'; Pringle 86' | Attendance: 5,926 |

| 10 August 2013 2 | Rotherham United | 0–0 | Preston North End | New York Stadium |
| 15:00 | | Report | | Attendance: 8,454 |

| 17 August 2013 3 | Crawley Town | 1–2 | Rotherham United | Broadfield Stadium |
| 15:00 | Sadler 15' | Report | Agard 35'; Worrall 76' | Attendance: 3,110 |

| 24 August 2013 4 | Rotherham United | 2–2 | Shrewsbury Town | New York Stadium |
| 15:00 | Revell 57'; Nardiello 69' | Report | Taylor 21'; Bradshaw 63' | Attendance: 7,234 |

| 31 August 2013 5 | Notts County | 0–1 | Rotherham United | Meadow Lane |
| 15:00 | | Report | Agard 37' | Attendance: 5,428 |

| 7 September 2013 6 | Rotherham United | 3–1 | Sheffield United | New York Stadium |
| 15:00 | Agard 51'; Nardiello 72' (pen.); Milsom 75' | Report | Baxter 37' | Attendance: 11758 |

| 14 September 2013 7 | Rotherham United | 3–2 | Oldham Athletic | New York Stadium |
| 15:00 | Nardiello 21' (pen.), 90'; Frecklington 63' | Report | Montano 41'; Lanzoni 53' | Attendance: 8,306 |

| 21 September 2013 8 | Walsall | 1–1 | Rotherham United | Bescot Stadium |
| 15:00 | Mantom 34' | Report | Nardiello 21' | Attendance: 5,002 |

| 28 September 2013 9 | Rotherham United | 0–1 | Peterborough United | New York Stadium |
| 15:00 | | Report | McCann 51' (pen.) | Attendance: 9717 |

| 5 October 2013 10 | Brentford | 0–1 | Rotherham United | Griffin Park |
| 15:00 | | Report | Bradley 14' | Attendance: 6614 (516 away) |

| 12 October 2013 11 | Rotherham United | 0–4 | Swindon Town | New York Stadium |
| 15:00 | | Report | Pritchard 33'; Luongo 45'; Ajose 65'; N'Guessan 90' | Attendance: 8103 |

| 19 October 2013 12 | Milton Keynes Dons | 3–2 | Rotherham United | Stadium MK |
| 15:00 | Williamson 44 (pen)' Reeves 66'; Bamford 88' | Report | Frecklington 73'; Flanagan 75 o.g.' | Attendance: 11,564 |

| 22 October 2013 13 | Rotherham United | 1–1 | Tranmere Rovers | New York Stadium |
| 19:45 | Agard 60' | | Lowe 84' | Attendance: 7511 |

| 26 October 2013 14 | Leyton Orient | 1–0 | Rotherham United | Matchroom Stadium |
| 15:00 | Lisbie 29' | | | Attendance: 5609 |

| 2 November 2013 15 | Rotherham United | 2–2 | Colchester United | New York Stadium |
| 19:45 | Tubbs 9'; Agard 24' | | Bean 7'; Lee 90' | Attendance: 7096 |

| 16 November 2013 16 | Stevenage | 0–3 | Rotherham United | Broadhall Way |
| 15:00 | | | Pringle 14'; Davis 61'; O'Connor 66' | Attendance: 2814 |

| 23 November 2013 17 | Rotherham United | 0–0 | Carlisle United | New York Stadium |
| 15:00 | | | | Attendance: 7520 |

| 26 November 2013 18 | Coventry City | 0–3 | Rotherham United | Sixfields Stadium |
| 19:45 | | | Dicko 58'; Revell 70'; Agard 73 (pen)' | Attendance: 1961 |

| 30 November 2013 19 | Rotherham United | 4–1 | Gillingham | New York Stadium |
| 15:00 | Dicko 9'; Agard 23'; Pringle 35'; Tavernier 76' | | McDonald 66' | Attendance: 7152 |

| 14 December 2013 20 | Bristol City | 1–2 | Rotherham United | Ashton Gate |
| 15:00 | Reid 82' | | Dicko 3'; Pringle 27' | Attendance: 11201 |

| 21 December 2013 21 | Rotherham United | 3–3 | Wolverhampton Wanderers | New York Stadium |
| 15:00 | Dicko 11,54'; Agard 37' | | Batth 10'; Sako 59 (pen)' Henry 64' | Attendance: 11092 |

| 26 December 2013 22 | Bradford City | 0–1 | Rotherham United | Valley Parade |
| 15:00 | | | Vuckic 21' | Attendance: 18218 (2,501 away) |

| 29 December 2013 23 | Port Vale | 2–0 | Rotherham United | Vale Park |
| 15:00 | Dodds 8'; Tomlin 67' | | | Attendance: 6738 |

| 1 January 2014 24 | Rotherham United | 1–3 | Coventry City | New York Stadium |
| 15:00 | Skarz 35' | | Baker 71', 90'; Moussa 85' | Attendance: 9154 |

| 11 January 2014 25 | Rotherham United | 4–2 | Crewe Alexandra | New York Stadium |
| 15:00 | Agard 29'; Frecklington (2) 68' (pen.), 90'; Revell 74' | | Inman 12'; Mellor 61' | Attendance: 7737 |

| 18 January 2014 26 | Shrewsbury Town | 0–3 | Rotherham United | Greenhous Meadow |
| 15:00 | | | Hitchock 10'; Pringle 18'; Tavernier 21' | Attendance: 5116 |

| 25 January 2014 27 | Rotherham United | 2–2 | Crawley Town | New York Stadium |
| 15:00 | Agard (2) 34' (pen.), 90' | Report | Tubbs 24'; Simpson 65' | Attendance: 7579; Referee: Michael Bull |

| 28 January 2014 28 | Tranmere Rovers | 1–2 | Rotherham United | Prenton Park |
| 19:45 | Robinson 90' | | Revell 39', 65' | Attendance: 3,777 |

| 1 February 2014 29 | Rotherham United | 2–1 | Leyton Orient | New York Stadium |
| 15:00 | Thomas 10'; Revell 90' | | Odubajo 76' | Attendance: 8,604 |

| 15 February 2014 30 | Rotherham United | 2–1 | Stevenage | New York Stadium |
| 15:00 GMT | Thomas 41'; Frecklington 88' | | Zoko 86' | Attendance: 7,393 |

| 22 February 2014 31 | Carlisle United | 1–2 | Rotherham United | Brunton Park |
| 15:00 GMT | Miller 45+3' | | Thomas 24'; Agard 90+2' | Attendance: 4,293 |

| 25 February 2014 32 | Preston North End | 3–3 | Rotherham United | Deepdale |
| 19:45 GMT | Davies 37'; Gallagher 60'; Garner 65' | | Frecklington 7', 89'; Clarke 11' (o.g.) | Attendance: 9,524 |

| 1 March 2014 33 | Rotherham United | 6–0 | Notts County | New York Stadium |
| 15:00 GMT | Tavernier 12'; Vučkić 16', 60'; Revell 26'; Agard 29' (pen.); Hitchcock 83' | | | Attendance: 8,383 |

| 4 March 2014 34 | Colchester United | 0–0 | Rotherham United | Colchester Community Stadium |
| 19:45 GMT | | | | Attendance: 2,655 |

| 11 March 2014 35 | Oldham Athletic | 0–2 | Rotherham United | Boundary Park |
| 19:45 GMT | | | Bradley 27'; Frecklington 64' | Attendance: 3,745 (1,119 away) |

| 15 March 2014 36 | Rotherham United | 1–1 | Walsall | New York Stadium |
| 15:00 GMT | Adams 89' | | Lalkovič 19'; Purkiss (yellow card) 73' (yellow-red card) | Attendance: 8,212 |

| 22 March 2014 37 | Peterborough United | 0–1 | Rotherham United | London Road Stadium |
| 15:00 GMT | | | Agard 45+3' (pen.) | Attendance: 6,625 |

| 25 March 2014 38 | Rotherham United | 3–0 | Brentford | New York Stadium |
| 19:45 GMT | Agard 14' (pen.), 45'; Vučkić 90+3' | | | Attendance: 8,365 |

| 29 March 2014 39 | Rotherham United | 2–1 | Bristol City | New York Stadium |
| 15:00 GMT | Tavernier 2', 60' | | Elliott 48' | Attendance: 8,607 |

| 5 April 2014 40 | Gillingham | 3–4 | Rotherham United | Priestfield Stadium |
| 15:00 BST | Akinfenwa 30'; Weston 57'; Dack 84' | | Agard 2'; Hitchcock 69', 86', 90+3' | Attendance: 6,027 |

| 8 April 2014 41 | Sheffield United | 1–0 | Rotherham United | Bramall Lane |
| 19:45 BST | Davies 90' (pen.) | | | Attendance: 21,529 (4,950 away) |

| 11 April 2014 42 | Rotherham United | 0–0 | Bradford City | New York Stadium |
| 19:52 BST | | | | Attendance: 9,228 |

| 18 April 2014 43 | Wolverhampton Wanderers | 6–4 | Rotherham United | Molineux Stadium |
| 15:00 BST | Dicko 21', 34', 80'; Edwards 38'; Ricketts 90'; McDonald 90+7' | | Agard 14', 61', 88'; Skarz 84' | Attendance: 30,110 |

| 21 April 2014 44 | Rotherham United | 1–0 | Port Vale | New York Stadium |
| 15:00 BST | Smallwood (red card) 45'; Agard 79' | | | Attendance: 7,743 |

| 26 April 2014 45 | Rotherham United | 2–2 | Milton Keynes Dons | New York Stadium |
| 15:00 BST | O'Connor 79'; Revell 90+4' | | Kennedy 9'; Galloway (yellow card) 49' (yellow-red card); McLeod 72' | Attendance: 9,405 |

| 3 May 2014 46 | Swindon Town | 1–2 | Rotherham United | County Ground |
| 15:00 BST | Smith 60' (pen.) | | Thomas 1', 23' | Attendance: 8,618 (644 away) |

==== Play-offs ====
| 10 May 2014 Semi-final 1st leg | Preston North End | 1–1 | Rotherham United | Deepdale |
| 17:15 BST | Garner 49' | Report | Revell 21' | Attendance: 17,221; Referee: Ian Williamson |

| 15 May 2014 Semi-final 2nd leg | Rotherham United | 3–1 (4–2 agg.) | Preston North End | New York Stadium |
| 19:45 BST | Thomas 24'; Frecklington 34'; Agard 67' | Report | Gallagher 16' | Attendance: 11,576; Referee: Keith Stroud |

| 25 May 2014 Final | Leyton Orient | 2–2 (a.e.t.) (3–4 p) | Rotherham United | Wembley Stadium |
| 15:00 BST | Odubajo 34'; Cox 39' | Report | Revell 55', 60' | Attendance: 43,401; Referee: David Coote |
| | Penalties |
| | James (penalty scored); Lundstram (penalty scored); Clarke (penalty scored); Baudry (penalty missed); Dagnall (penalty missed) | | (penalty scored) Agard; (penalty missed) Frecklington; (penalty scored) Pringle; (penalty scored) Tavernier; (penalty scored) Smallwood |

=== Football League Cup ===
| 6 August 2013 First round | Rotherham United | 2–1 | Sheffield Wednesday | New York Stadium |
| 19:45 | Pringle 10'; Frecklington 38' | Match Analysis | McCabe 23'; Johnson (red card) 58' | Attendance: 11,433 |

| 28 August 2013 Second round | Aston Villa | 3–0 | Rotherham United | Villa Park |
| 19:45 | Weimann 22'; Benteke 40'; Delph 53' | Match Analysis | | Attendance: 22,447 |

=== Football League Trophy ===
| 8 October 2013 Second round | York City | 0–3 | Rotherham United | Bootham Crescent |
| 19:45 BST | | Match Analysis | Smith 17' (o.g.); Agard 61' (pen.); Revell 69' | Attendance: 2,372 |

| 12 November 2013 Quarter-final | Hartlepool United | 1–2 | Rotherham United | Victoria Park, Hartlepool |
| 19:45 GMT | Monkhouse 24' | Report | Eaves 9'; Agard 45' | Attendance: 2,911; Referee: Darren Drysdale |

| 10 December 2013 Semi-final | Fleetwood Town | 2–1 | Rotherham United | Highbury Stadium, Fleetwood |
| 19:45 GMT | Hughes 19'; McLaughlin 70' | Report | Dicko 56' | Attendance: 2,224; Referee: Scott Duncan |

=== FA Cup ===
| 9 November 2013 First round | Rotherham United | 3–0 | Bradford City | New York Stadium |
| 15:00 | Agard 13', 71'; Revell 62' | Report | | Attendance: 7,667; Referee: James Adcock |

| 7 December 2013 Second round | Rotherham United | 1–2 | Rochdale | New York Stadium |
| 15:00 | Frecklington 6' | Report | Lund 55'; Vincenti 83' | Attendance: 4,957; Referee: Graham Scott |

== Transfers ==
As of 9 October 2013

Players transferred in
| Date | Pos. | Nat. | Name | Previous club | Fee | Ref. |
|---|---|---|---|---|---|---|
| 29 April 2013 | DF | (England) | Joe Skarz | Bury | Free | |
| 23 May 2013 | DF | (England) | Richard Brindley | Chesterfield | Free Agent | |
| 23 May 2013 | GK | (England) | Adam Collin | Carlisle United | Free Agent | |
| 11 June 2013 | MF | (England) | Nicky Walker | Rotherham United Academy | Free | |
| 11 June 2013 | GK | (England) | Tony Thompson | Rotherham United Academy | Free | |
| 20 June 2013 | MF | (England) | David Worrall | Bury | Undisclosed | |
| 24 June 2013 | MF | (England) | Robert Milsom | Aberdeen | Free | |
| 20 June 2013 | FW | (England) | Danny Hylton | Aldershot Town | Free Agent | |
| 4 July 2013 | MF | (Scotland) | Michael Tidser | Greenock Morton | Undisclosed | |
| 30 August 2013 | DF | (England) | Pablo Mills | Macclesfield Town | Free Agent (successful trial) | |
Players transferred out
| Date | Pos. | Nat. | Name | To | Fee | Ref. |
| 2 May 2013 | GK | (England) | Andy Warrington | Released | Free | |
| 2 May 2013 | DF | (England) | Dale Tonge | Released | Free | |
| 2 May 2013 | FW | (England) | Alec Denton | Released | Free | |
| 19 June 2013 | DF | (England) | Nicky Hunt | Released | Free | |
| 26 June 2013 | DF | (England) | Ian Sharps | Released | Mutual Consent | |
| 22 July 2013 | DF | (England) | Johnny Mullins | Oxford United | Undisclosed | |
Players loaned in
| Date from | Pos. | Nat | Name | From | Date to | Ref. |
| 27 July 2013 | FW | (England) | Matthew Tubbs | AFC Bournemouth | 31 January 2014 | |
| 21 September 2013 | FW | (England) | Tom Eaves | Bolton Wanderers | 31 January 2014 | |
Players loaned out
| Date from | Pos. | Nat | Name | To | Date to | Ref. |
| 29 August 2013 | MF | (England) | Lionel Ainsworth | Motherwell | 31 January 2014 | |
| 2 September 2013 | MF | (Scotland) | David Noble | Cheltenham Town | 31 January 2014 | |
| 10 September 2013 | FW | (Nigeria) | Kayode Odejayi | Accrington Stanley | 31 January 2014 | |
