= Richard Brindley =

English footballer

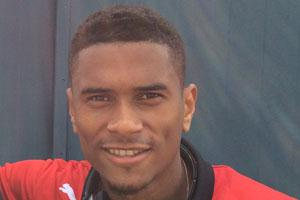
- Brindley with Rotherham United in July 2014

Personal information
- Full name: Richard Michael Brindley
- Date of birth: 5 May 1993 (age 33)
- Place of birth: Norwich, England
- Height: 1.78 m (5 ft 10 in)
- Position: Right-back

Team information
- Current team: Havant & Waterlooville

Youth career
- 2002–2011: Norwich City

Senior career*
Years	Team	Apps	(Gls)
2011–2012	Norwich City	0	(0)
2012–2013	Chelmsford City	10	(0)
2013	Chesterfield	12	(0)
2013–2015	Rotherham United	18	(1)
2014–2015	→ Scunthorpe United (loan)	3	(0)
2015	→ Oxford United (loan)	3	(0)
2015	→ Colchester United (loan)	8	(0)
2015–2017	Colchester United	62	(2)
2017–2018	Barnet	18	(1)
2018–2019	Bromley	33	(2)
2019–2024	Notts County	137	(1)
2024–2026	Eastleigh	67	(3)
2026–	Havant & Waterlooville	0	(0)
- * Club domestic league appearances and goals as of 11:00, 17 July 2026 (UTC)

Richard Michael Brindley (born 5 May 1993) is an English professional footballer who plays as a right-back for Southern League Premier Division South club Havant & Waterlooville.

Brindley progressed through the academy at Norwich City, but was released in 2012 after failing to break into the first-team. He joined Chelmsford City, where his performances attracted the attention of Chesterfield. He signed for the League Two side in January 2013, where he would make his professional debut. He was then signed by Rotherham United, but struggled to hold down a regular starting berth, his one and only goal came in a 5–1 defeat to Bournemouth in the FA Cup in 2015. He was subsequently loaned out during the 2014–15 season to Scunthorpe United, Oxford United and Colchester United. Following his release from Rotherham in the summer of 2015, he joined Colchester United on a permanent basis. He signed for Barnet in July 2017, who he left at the end of the season following relegation.

== Career ==
=== Norwich City ===
Born in Norwich, Brindley began his career at Norwich City, where he played as either a central midfielder or as a full-back. He joined the club at the age of nine, and it was announced in October 2008 that he would be offered a scholarship that would begin in June 2009. He broke into the youth team in 2009, scoring against Aston Villa after coming on as a substitute.

In May 2012, a year after turning professional at Norwich City, it was announced that Brindley would not be offered a new contract and would be released by the club, yet to make a first-team appearance.

=== Chelmsford City ===
Brindley signed for Conference South side Chelmsford City in the summer of 2012 following his release from Carrow Road. He made his debut on 18 August in their 1–1 draw with Havant & Waterlooville at West Leigh Park.

During his time with Chelmsford, Brindley played one game for the UK Football Finder Elite Development Squad on 12 September in a match against a Leatherhead XI, with his side coming out 4–2 victors.

Brindley scored his first and only goal for Chelmsford on 10 December when they defeated Hampton & Richmond Borough 3–2 in the FA Trophy. He scored after only one minute of play. He played his final game for the club on 12 January 2013, starting in a 3–0 defeat to FC Halifax Town at The Shay in the FA Trophy. He made ten Conference South appearances and three FA Trophy appearances in addition to his one goal. He also featured in the FA Cup four times, including starting in the first round 3–1 win over Colchester United, and the 3–0 second round defeat to Crawley Town. He made 24 appearances in all competitions for Chelmsford, and was also awarded with three man of the match awards during his time at the club.

=== Chesterfield ===
League Two side Chesterfield signed Brindley on 17 January 2013, with the deal running until the end of the 2012–13 season. His first outing for the club was in the Derbyshire Senior Cup on 29 January in Chesterfield's 4–2 win against Belper Town. Coach John Dungworth was pleased with Brindley's debut, saying that he was "energetic and full of confidence". Prior to making a first-team appearance, Brindley said that his chance with the club showed "great opportunity to progress" and that he would "like to stay longer [than the end of the season]".

Brindley made his Football League and professional debut on 9 February, where he came on as a substitute for Danny Whitaker in the final minutes of a 2–0 home win over AFC Wimbledon. Though he only had limited playing time on his debut, Brindley said that he was "grateful" for the opportunity. He provided an assist for Marc Richards to score the only goal in a 1–0 win over Oxford United on 16 March.

After making nine appearances for the Spireites, Brindley was dropped from the squad ahead of a match against Barnet in April over contractual issues, where negotiations between both parties broke down concerning the extension of his deal with the club. He would eventually end the season having played twelve League Two games, but his long-term future was still not resolved by the end of the campaign.

=== Rotherham United ===
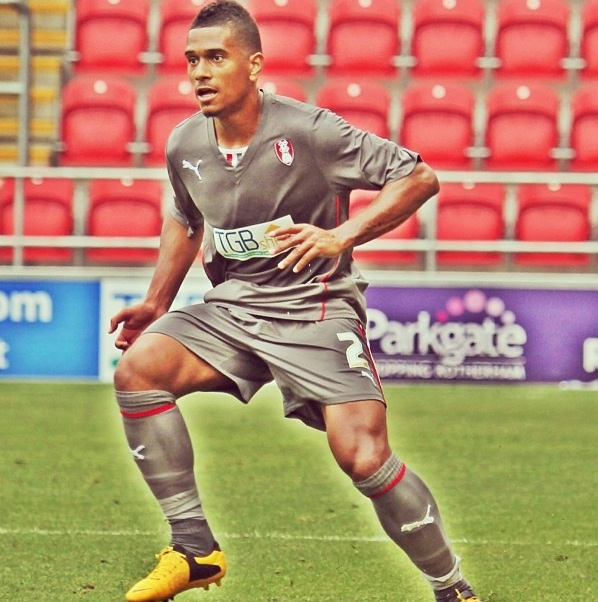
Brindley playing for Rotherham United in July 2013.

Following the expiry of his contract at Chesterfield, Brindley joined League One side Rotherham United on 23 May 2013. He signed a two-year deal at the New York Stadium. His new manager Steve Evans said that Rotherham had "watched him [Brindley] at Chesterfield on four occasions and we knew then that he was a top talent". Following the move, Brindley added that he was determined to prove himself at League One level, setting himself a target of getting "first-team experience and experience in League One".

Brindley made his Rotherham debut in the opening game of the 2013–14 season, starting in a 3–3 draw with Crewe Alexandra. During the first few weeks of the season, Brindley held down the right-back spot following an injury to Utility player Mark Bradley, who provided competition for the position across the season, and on-loan Newcastle United right-back James Tavernier.

Brindley fell out of favour for the early part of 2014, starting only twice between December 2013 and May 2014. A host of injuries saw Brindley recalled to the starting line-up for Rotherham's play-off first leg match at Preston North End on 10 May, but was substituted after only 23 minutes following an injury. After Rotherham reached the play-off final, Brindley started the match on the bench, but came on for Wes Thomas after 54 minutes at Wembley Stadium while Rotherham were 2–0 down to Leyton Orient. The Millers pegged the score back to 2–2, and secured promotion to the Championship as they won 4–3 after a penalty shoot-out. Despite helping his side to promotion, Brindley made just 16 League One appearances across the season, and 24 in all competitions.

Brindley made his first appearance in the Championship on 23 August 2014, when he came on as an 89th-minute substitute for Ben Pringle in Rotherham's 1–0 win over Millwall at The Den. He was to make his final appearance for the club on 3 January 2015, following his loan spell at Scunthorpe United. The game saw Brindley score his first professional goal after 10 minutes of the FA Cup third round encounter with Bournemouth, but his side were to eventually lose 5–1 at home.

==== Scunthorpe United loan ====
On 25 November 2014, Brindley made a return to League One, signing for Scunthorpe United on loan until January. He made his debut on 13 December, starting in Scunthorpe's 2–1 home win over Crewe. He returned to Rotherham due to injuries after making just three appearances for Scunthorpe.

==== Oxford United loan ====
Brindley signed on loan for one month for League Two Oxford United on 29 January 2015, with a view to a permanent move. He played his first game for Oxford on 31 January as his side beat Stevenage 2–0. After the club brought in George Baldock on loan from MK Dons, Brindley returned to Rotherham after his short-term loan expired, making just three appearances.

==== Colchester United loan ====
Colchester United signed Brindley on 26 March 2015 on loan until the end of the season, following Ipswich Town loanee Elliott Hewitt's recall. He revealed that he turned down other offers in order to join Colchester, and also revealed that his deal could later become permanent.

He made his debut on 3 April in Colchester's 2–1 win over Port Vale at Vale Park. He made eight appearances for Colchester through to the end of the 2014–15 season.

=== Colchester United ===
Colchester United held talks with their former loanee Brindley in May 2015, following his release by Rotherham. He then signed a two-year contract with Colchester on 2 June. He made his second debut on 8 August in Colchester's 2–2 home draw with Blackpool. He scored his first ever league goal on 25 March 2016 after being introduced as a second-half substitute for Elliot Lee during Colchester's win against Doncaster Rovers. His 87th-minute shot completed the scoring in a 4–1 victory. He ended his first full season with the club with 25 appearances.

Under new manager John McGreal, Brindley became a regular in Colchester's starting eleven in the 2016–17 season, where he operated as a right wing-back in a 3-5-2 formation. Brindley said "Last season wasn't a great one for myself with injuries and managers coming in and out but this season has been brilliant for me, I feel I'm playing well and that's all I want to do". He later said that wing-back had become his "best position". He scored his first goal of the season with a free kick in Colchester's 1–1 draw with Morecambe on 17 April 2017. He ended the season with 43 first-team appearances. He was offered a new contract at the end of the season, but opted to leave the club after refusing terms.

=== Barnet ===
On 10 July 2017, Brindley joined Colchester's League Two rivals Barnet on a free transfer. On 5 May 2018, Brindley scored his first goal for Barnet in a 3–0 win over Chesterfield in a game that saw Barnet relegated from the Football League. He left the club by mutual consent on 7 July 2018.

=== Bromley ===
On 25 September 2018, Brindley signed for Bromley, making his debut in a 2–1 victory away to Ebbsfleet United, playing the full 90 minutes. Brindley went on to score twice in 36 games before leaving at the end of the season.

=== Notts County ===
On 5 September 2019, Brindley signed for Notts County. Brindley signed a new two-year contract in May 2022. On 28 April 2024 Brindley left Notts County at end of contract.

=== Eastleigh ===
On 8 July 2024, Brindley joined National League side Eastleigh.

=== Havant & Waterlooville ===
On 16 July 2026, Brindley joined Southern League Premier Division South club Havant & Waterlooville.

== Career statistics ==
As of end of 2023–24 season

Appearances and goals by club, season and competition
Club	Season	League			FA Cup		League Cup		Other		Total	
Club	Season	Division	Apps	Goals	Apps	Goals	Apps	Goals	Apps	Goals	Apps	Goals
Norwich City	2011–12	Premier League	0	0	0	0	–		0	0	0	0
Chelmsford City	2012–13	Conference South	10	0	4	0	–		3 (Note: Appearances in FA Trophy)	0	17	0
Chesterfield	2012–13	League Two	12	0	–		–		–		12	0
Rotherham United	2013–14	League One	16	0	2	0	1	0	5 (Note: Appearances in Football League Trophy) (Note: Appearances in English Football League play-offs)	0	24	0
Rotherham United	2014–15	Championship	2	0	1	1	1	0	–		4	1
Rotherham United	Total		18	0	3	1	2	0	5	0	28	1
Scunthorpe United (loan)	2014–15	League One	3	0	–		–		–		3	0
Oxford United (loan)	2014–15	League Two	3	0	–		–		–		3	0
Colchester United (loan)	2014–15	League One	8	0	–		–		–		8	0
Colchester United	2015–16	League One	21	1	3	0	1	0	0	0	25	1
Colchester United	2016–17	League Two	41	1	1	0	0	0	1 (Note: Appearance in EFL Trophy)	0	43	1
Colchester United	Total		62	2	4	0	1	0	1	0	68	2
Barnet	2017–18	League Two	18	1	0	0	0	0	0	0	18	1
Bromley	2018–19	National League	33	2	2	0	0	0	1	0	35	2
Notts County	2019–20	National League	24	1	2	0	0	0	2	0	28	1
Notts County	2020–21	National League	21	0	0	0	—		5 (Note: Three appearances in FA Trophy and two in National League play-offs)	0	26	0
Notts County	2021–22	National League	32	0	3	0	—		2 (Note: One appearance in FA Trophy and one appearance in National League play-offs)	0	37	0
Notts County	2022–23	National League	29	0	1	0	—		3 (Note: One appearance in FA Trophy and one appearance in National League play-offs)	0	33	0
Notts County	2023–24	League Two	27	0	1	1	1	0	2	0	31	1
Notts County	Total		133	1	7	1	1	0	14	0	155	2
Career total			300	6	21	2	4	0	24	0	347	8

== Honours ==
Rotherham United

- Football League One play-offs: 2014

Notts County

- National League play-offs: 2023
