= Daniel Rowe (footballer, born 1995) =

English footballer

Personal information
- Full name: Daniel Rowe
- Date of birth: 24 October 1995 (age 31)
- Place of birth: Middlesbrough, England
- Height: 6 ft 2 in (1.88 m)
- Positions: Defender; midfielder

Team information
- Current team: Redcar Athletic

Youth career
- Darlington
- –2013: Rotherham United

Senior career*
Years	Team	Apps	(Gls)
2013–2015	Rotherham United	0	(0)
2014	→ Stalybridge Celtic (loan)	4	(0)
2014	→ Wycombe Wanderers (loan)	7	(0)
2014	→ Wycombe Wanderers (loan)	8	(0)
2014–2015	→ Wycombe Wanderers (loan)	8	(0)
2015–2017	Wycombe Wanderers	24	(1)
2016	→ Barrow (loan)	3	(0)
2017	→ Barrow (loan)	9	(0)
2017–2018	York City	10	(1)
2018–2019	Frickley Athletic	21	(0)
2019–2024	Whitby Town	168	(18)
2024–2026	Spennymoor Town	43	(4)
2026–	Redcar Athletic	0	(0)
- * Club domestic league appearances and goals as of 05:26, 21 March 2026 (UTC)

Daniel Rowe (born 24 October 1995) is an English semi-professional footballer who plays as a defender or midfielder for Northern Premier League East side Redcar Athletic.

== Career ==
=== Rotherham United ===
Rowe was born in Middlesbrough, North Yorkshire. He began his career with Rotherham United after leaving Darlington. He made his first-team debut on 8 October 2013 as an 87th-minute substitute in a 3–0 win over York City in the Football League Trophy.

Rowe joined Conference North club Stalybridge Celtic on 7 March 2014 on a work-experience loan. On 27 March 2014, he joined League Two club Wycombe Wanderers on loan until the end of the 2013–14 season. Rowe made his debut two days later, starting in a 0–0 draw away to Scunthorpe United. At the end of the 2013–14 season, he was offered a new contract at Rotherham.

On 31 July 2014, Rowe re-joined Wycombe on loan for three months, along with Rotherham teammate Nicky Walker. After making nine appearances, Rowe was recalled by Rotherham on 27 September 2014. On 18 October 2014, Rowe re-joined Wycombe on loan. After making 16 appearances, Rowe's loan with Wycombe was extended until the end of the 2014–15 season. He was recalled by Rotherham on 2 April 2015.

=== Wycombe Wanderers ===
Rowe signed for Wycombe permanently on 30 June 2015 on a three-year contract. He scored his first goal for Wycombe with a close-range shot in the 82nd minute of a 3–2 defeat at home to Northampton Town on 3 October 2015.

Rowe joined National League club Barrow on 18 February 2016 on a one-month loan, having not played for Wycombe since December 2015. He made three appearances for Barrow. On 6 January 2017, Rowe rejoined Barrow on loan until the end of the 2016–17 season.

=== Non-League ===
On 27 October 2017, Rowe signed for National League North club York City on a contract until June 2019, two days after leaving Wycombe by mutual consent for personal reasons. He made 12 appearances and scored one goal as York finished 2017–18 in 11th place in the table. He left at the end of the season after an agreement was reached over the remaining year of his contract.

Rowe signed for Northern Premier League Division One East club Frickley Athletic on 18 May 2018. He left Frickley to join Whitby Town in 2019. He made 168 league appearances for Whitby.

On 21 May 2024, Rowe moved up a division signing for National League North side Spennymoor Town. Rowe made a total of 53 appearances in all competitions for The Moors, including playing at Wembley Stadium in the 2025 FA Trophy final.

In February 2026, he signed for Northern Premier League East side Redcar Athletic for an undisclosed fee.

== Personal life ==
Rowe attended Northfield School & Sports College in Billingham and was in the same year as fellow future footballer Brad Walker. After moving into part-time football, Rowe started working at his old school as a learning support assistant.

== Career statistics ==
As of match played 15 September 2018

Appearances and goals by club, season and competition
Club	Season	League			FA Cup		League Cup		Other		Total	
Club	Season	Division	Apps	Goals	Apps	Goals	Apps	Goals	Apps	Goals	Apps	Goals
Rotherham United	2012–13	League Two	0	0	0	0	0	0	0	0	0	0
Rotherham United	2013–14	League One	0	0	0	0	0	0	1 (Note: Appearance in Football League Trophy)	0	1	0
Rotherham United	2014–15	Championship	0	0	0	0	—		—		0	0
Rotherham United	Total		0	0	0	0	0	0	1	0	1	0
Stalybridge Celtic (loan)	2013–14	Conference North	4	0	—		—		—		4	0
Wycombe Wanderers (loan)	2013–14	League Two	7	0	—		—		—		7	0
Wycombe Wanderers (loan)	2014–15	League Two	16	0	—		0	0	1	0	17	0
Wycombe Wanderers	2015–16	League Two	12	1	0	0	1	0	1	0	14	1
Wycombe Wanderers	2016–17	League Two	12	0	—		0	0	3 (Note: Appearances in EFL Trophy)	1	15	1
Wycombe Wanderers	2017–18	League Two	0	0	—		1	0	0	0	1	0
Wycombe Wanderers	Total		47	1	0	0	2	0	5	1	54	2
Barrow (loan)	2015–16	National League	3	0	—		—		—		3	0
Barrow (loan)	2016–17	National League	9	0	1	0	—		1 (Note: Appearance(s) in FA Trophy)	0	11	0
Barrow (loan)	Total		12	0	1	0	—		1	0	14	0
York City	2017–18	National League North	10	1	—		—		2	0	12	1
Frickley Athletic	2018–19	Northern Premier League; Division One East	6	0	1	0	—		0	0	7	0
Career total			79	2	2	0	2	0	9	1	92	3

== Honours ==
Spennymoor Town

- FA Trophy runner-up: 2024–25
