= Kieran Agard =

English footballer (born 1989)

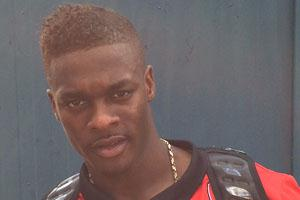
- Agard in 2014

Personal information
- Full name: Kieran Ricardo Agard
- Date of birth: 10 October 1989 (age 37)
- Place of birth: Newham, England
- Height: 1.79 m (5 ft 10 in)
- Positions: Forward; winger

Youth career
- 1999–2005: Arsenal
- 2005–2008: Everton

Senior career*
| Years | Team | Apps | (Gls) |
| 2008–2011 | Everton | 1 | (0) |
| 2011 | → Peterborough United (loan) | 0 | (0) |
| 2011 | → Kilmarnock (loan) | 8 | (1) |
| 2011–2012 | Yeovil Town | 29 | (6) |
| 2012–2014 | Rotherham United | 78 | (27) |
| 2014–2016 | Bristol City | 64 | (15) |
| 2016–2021 | Milton Keynes Dons | 145 | (40) |
| 2021–2022 | Plymouth Argyle | 12 | (1) |
| 2022–2023 | Doncaster Rovers | 32 | (3) |
| 2024 | Litherland Athletic JFC | 6 | (6) |
| Total | | 375 | (99) |
- * Club domestic league appearances and goals as of 16 March 2024

Kieran Ricardo Agard (born 10 October 1989) is an English professional footballer who plays as a forward.

== Early life ==
Agard was born in Newham in London. He attended Lister Community School.

== Club career ==
=== Everton ===
Agard started in the Arsenal academy before moving to Everton's academy in the 2005–06 season. He played for the club's under-18 team, before moving into the reserve team, becoming the reserve team player of the year in 2008–09.

His first team debut came in a 4–0 away win at Hull City in a League Cup match in September 2009. He made his Premier League debut against Chelsea, coming on as a substitute for Louis Saha in stoppage time. At the end of the 2010–11 season, he was released by Everton along with goalkeeper Iain Turner and Hope Akpan after their contracts with the club expired.

On 6 January 2011, he joined Peterborough United on loan until the end of the 2010–11 season, but after playing just once, in the FA Cup, a change of management left Agard surplus to requirements and the loan was cut short. On 31 January 2011 Agard joined Scottish Premier League club Kilmarnock, also on loan. and made his debut in the Scottish Premier League as Kilmarnock lose to Hibernian 2–1 on 12 February 2011 before scoring his first goal in Scotland against Hearts in a 2–2 draw on 30 April 2011.

=== Yeovil Town ===
Agard, following his release from Everton, signed a one-year deal with Yeovil Town on 22 June 2011. The club's management was first alerted to Agard's availability after asking fans to suggest signings on Twitter, to which Agard became known as football's first "twansfer".

He scored his first two goals for the Glovers in a 3–2 defeat to Sheffield Wednesday on 17 September 2011. He then went on to score against Bury and Leyton Orient, also winning two penalties for his team. He also scored a winner against Wycombe Wanderers, but was sent off against Colchester United a week later. His next goal was in the 3 – 2 win over Chesterfield at Huish Park. He finished the season with 29 appearances in the league, and 6 goals. On 8 May 2012, Agard was released from Yeovil Town after just one year at the club.

=== Rotherham United ===
On 27 July 2012 Agard joined then League Two club Rotherham United. He scored his first goal for the club on 27 October 2012 in a 1–0 win against Plymouth Argyle. In December, he scored in successive games against AFC Wimbledon and Port Vale. In April 2013, Agard scored in three successive wins against Fleetwood Town, Bradford City and Plymouth Argyle, contributing greatly to the clubs' automatic promotion to League One later that month.

He scored his first goal of the 2013–14 season on 17 August 2013, in a 2–1 win against Crawley Town, before scoring in successive wins against Notts County and Sheffield United. Agard's first ever cup goal came on 8 October, in a 3–0 victory away to York City in the Football League Trophy. On 18 April, he scored a hat-trick against Wolverhampton Wanderers in a 6–4 defeat. During May 2014, Agard won the League 1 player of the month award for April, after a run of scoring 5 goals in 6 games.

During the 2013–14 season, Agard scored 26 goals in all competitions, with Agard finishing the 3rd top scorer in League 1 behind Sam Baldock and Britt Assombalonga with 21 of his 26 goals coming in League 1, his goals helped Rotherham reach the League 1 playoff final. Agard played in the final, and after a 2–2 draw, Rotherham earned promotion after beating Leyton Orient 4–3 on penalties (with Agard scoring Rotherham's first penalty) to earn a second successive promotion.

At the end of the 2013–14 season, Agard was out of contract, however on 9 July 2014, Rotherham exercised an option in Agard's contract to extend it for another year. Agard turned down Rotherham's offer to extend his contract beyond the year option that was exercised by the club.

On 9 August 2014, Agard started for Rotherham in their opening fixture of The Championship season in a 1–0 defeat against Derby County. On 15 August, Leeds United had a bid accepted for Agard, however, after holding talks with Leeds and unable to agree personal terms, the move fell through.

=== Bristol City ===
On 21 August 2014, Agard signed for League One side Bristol City for an undisclosed fee, thought to be in the region of £750,000. With Bristol City Agard won the 2015 League One and Football League Trophy titles.

=== Milton Keynes Dons ===
On 11 August 2016, Agard joined League One side Milton Keynes Dons for an undisclosed, club-record transfer fee. On 13 August 2016, Agard made his debut for the club, scoring twice in a 2–2 home draw with Millwall. On 30 December 2016, Agard score twice in a 3–2 home league win against Swindon Town.

Following relegation from League One with the club at the end of the 2017–18 season, Agard played a key role in the club's following successful 2018–19 season in League Two, finishing top scorer with 22 goals in all competitions as the team secured a third-place finish and promotion back to League One.

He signed a new contract with the club in June 2019. During the first few months of the 2020–21 season, through a combination of injury and a lack of first team opportunities, Agard found himself out of favour with new manager Russell Martin. He eventually made his first appearance of the campaign on 8 December 2020 in a 6–0 EFL Trophy Round of 32 home win over Norwich City U21, scoring two goals in the match.

On 6 May 2021, the club announced Agard was one of four players to be released at the end of the 2020–21 season, bringing to an end his almost five-year association with the club in which he scored 50 times in 166 appearances, making him MK Dons' third highest all-time goalscorer upon his departure.

=== Plymouth Argyle ===
On 10 September 2021, Agard joined League One club Plymouth Argyle on a short-term deal until January 2022. Agard left the club in January after the expiration of his contract.

=== Doncaster Rovers ===
On 12 January 2022, Agard joined League One club Doncaster Rovers on a free transfer, signing an 18-month deal.

== International career ==
Born in England, Agard is also eligible to play for Jamaica, St. Vincent & Grenadines and Dominica due to his heritage.

== Career statistics ==
As of match played 7 April 2023

Appearances and goals by club, season and competition
| Club | Season | League | | | FA Cup | | League Cup | | Other | | Total | |
| Club | Season | Division | Apps | Goals | Apps | Goals | Apps | Goals | Apps | Goals | Apps | Goals |
|---|---|---|---|---|---|---|---|---|---|---|---|---|
| Everton | 2008–09 | Premier League | 0 | 0 | 0 | 0 | 0 | 0 | 0 | 0 | 0 | 0 |
| Everton | 2009–10 | Premier League | 1 | 0 | 1 | 0 | 1 | 0 | 3 (Note: Appearances in UEFA Europa League) | 0 | 6 | 0 |
| Everton | 2010–11 | Premier League | 0 | 0 | 0 | 0 | 0 | 0 | — | | 0 | 0 |
| Everton | Total | | 1 | 0 | 1 | 0 | 1 | 0 | 3 | 0 | 6 | 0 |
| Peterborough United (loan) | 2010–11 | League One | 0 | 0 | 1 | 0 | 0 | 0 | 0 | 0 | 1 | 0 |
| Kilmarnock (loan) | 2010–11 | SPL | 8 | 1 | — | | — | | — | | 8 | 1 |
| Yeovil Town | 2011–12 | League One | 29 | 6 | 3 | 0 | 1 | 0 | 1 (Note: Appearance(s) in Football League Trophy) | 0 | 34 | 6 |
| Rotherham United | 2012–13 | League Two | 30 | 6 | 1 | 0 | 1 | 0 | 1 | 0 | 33 | 6 |
| Rotherham United | 2013–14 | League One | 46 | 21 | 2 | 2 | 2 | 0 | 5 (Note: Three appearances and two goals in Football League Trophy, two appearances and one goal in League Two play-offs) | 3 | 55 | 26 |
| Rotherham United | 2014–15 | Championship | 2 | 0 | 0 | 0 | 1 | 0 | — | | 3 | 0 |
| Rotherham United | Total | | 78 | 27 | 3 | 2 | 4 | 0 | 6 | 3 | 91 | 32 |
| Bristol City | 2014–15 | League One | 39 | 13 | 3 | 1 | — | | 3 | 0 | 45 | 14 |
| Bristol City | 2015–16 | Championship | 25 | 2 | 2 | 1 | 1 | 0 | — | | 28 | 3 |
| Bristol City | Total | | 64 | 15 | 5 | 2 | 1 | 0 | 3 | 0 | 73 | 17 |
| Milton Keynes Dons | 2016–17 | League One | 42 | 12 | 4 | 1 | 0 | 0 | 2 (Note: Appearance(s) in EFL Trophy) | 1 | 48 | 14 |
| Milton Keynes Dons | 2017–18 | League One | 41 | 6 | 4 | 2 | 1 | 0 | 1 | 0 | 47 | 8 |
| Milton Keynes Dons | 2018–19 | League Two | 43 | 20 | 1 | 1 | 0 | 0 | 1 | 1 | 45 | 22 |
| Milton Keynes Dons | 2019–20 | League One | 19 | 2 | 0 | 0 | 2 | 0 | 4 | 2 | 25 | 4 |
| Milton Keynes Dons | 2020–21 | League One | 0 | 0 | 0 | 0 | 0 | 0 | 1 | 2 | 1 | 2 |
| Milton Keynes Dons | Total | | 145 | 40 | 9 | 4 | 3 | 0 | 9 | 6 | 166 | 50 |
| Plymouth Argyle | 2021–22 | League One | 12 | 1 | 2 | 0 | — | | 2 | 2 | 16 | 3 |
| Doncaster Rovers | 2021–22 | League One | 8 | 0 | 0 | 0 | 0 | 0 | 0 | 0 | 8 | 0 |
| Doncaster Rovers | 2022–23 | League Two | 24 | 3 | 1 | 0 | 1 | 0 | 2 | 0 | 28 | 3 |
| Career total | | | 369 | 93 | 25 | 8 | 11 | 0 | 24 | 11 | 431 | 112 |

== Honours ==
Rotherham United

- Football League One play-offs: 2014
- Football League Two runner-up: 2012–13

Bristol City

- Football League One: 2014–15
- Football League Trophy: 2014–15

Milton Keynes Dons

- EFL League Two third-place promotion: 2018–19

Individual

- Everton U21 Player of the Season: 2008–09
- Football League One Player of the Month: April 2014
- Milton Keynes Dons Players' Player of the Year: 2018–19
