= Richard Smallwood (footballer) =

English footballer (born 1990)

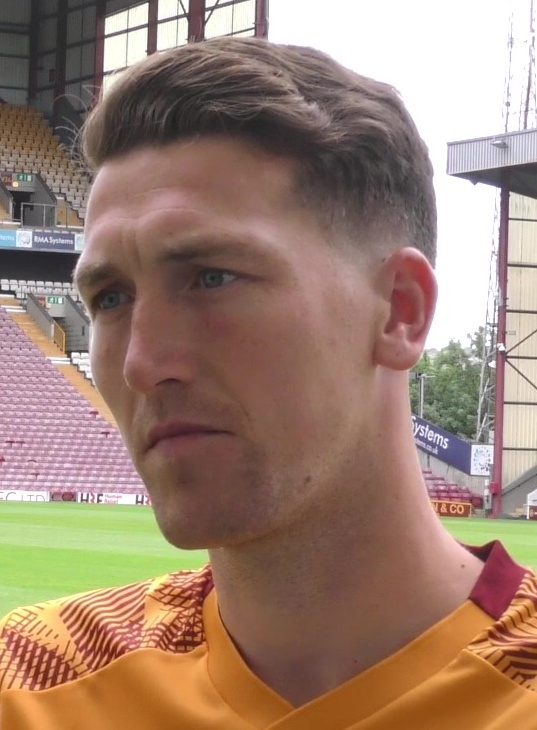
- Smallwood in 2022

Personal information
- Full name: Richard Smallwood
- Date of birth: 29 December 1990 (age 35)
- Place of birth: Redcar, England
- Height: 1.80 m (5 ft 11 in)
- Position: Midfielder

Team information
- Current team: Bristol Rovers
- Number: 21

Youth career
- Redcar Town
- –2010: Middlesbrough

Senior career*
Years	Team	Apps	(Gls)
2010–2014	Middlesbrough	60	(3)
2014	→ Rotherham United (loan)	19	(0)
2014–2017	Rotherham United	108	(3)
2016–2017	→ Scunthorpe United (loan)	16	(1)
2017–2020	Blackburn Rovers	78	(2)
2020–2022	Hull City	69	(2)
2022–2025	Bradford City	130	(6)
2025–2026	Tranmere Rovers	26	(0)
2026	→ Bristol Rovers (loan)	15	(0)
2026–	Bristol Rovers	13	(0)

International career
2008	England U18	1	(0)
- * Club domestic league appearances and goals as of 18:38, 21 November 2026 (UTC)

Richard Smallwood (born 29 December 1990) is an English professional footballer who plays as a central midfielder for EFL League Two club Bristol Rovers.

Born in Redcar, he signed his first professional deal with local side Middlesbrough in 2009. He was sent out on loan to Rotherham United in 2014 where he scored the winning penalty in the 2014 League One play-off final. Smallwood signed permanently for Rotherham in 2014, where he would win the club's Player of the Year award in his first full season. After a loan spell with Scunthorpe United, he signed for recently relegated League One club Blackburn Rovers in 2017. He was an ever-present for Blackburn in his first season as the club were promoted back to the Championship. Smallwood left Blackburn in 2020 for Hull City where he would win the League One title in his first season. After two seasons with Hull, Smallwood moved to League Two club Bradford City where he was named as captain. In his third season with the club, he played a pivotal role in Bradford's promotion, earning the club's Player of the Season award as well as being named in the League Two Team of the Season. He subsequently joined Tranmere Rovers in 2025.

== Club career ==
=== Middlesbrough ===
Smallwood's natural position is the holding role in the centre of midfield. He is a product of the Middlesbrough Academy having begun his career with his home-town club Redcar Town.

At the start of the 2009–10 season, Smallwood signed his first professional contract with the club. Smallwood made his debut for Middlesbrough on 19 October 2010 in a 1–0 away defeat to Nottingham Forest. In January 2011, Smallwood signed an 18-month contract with the club. On 2 May 2011, Smallwood scored his first goal for the club in a 3–0 win against Cardiff City. On 3 November 2012, he scored his second league goal in a 4–1 win away to Charlton Athletic. However, in the 2013–14 season, Smallwood lost his first team place following new arrivals. Under the management of Aitor Karanka, Smallwood was among the players to be offloaded as part of Karanka's plans to reduce the squad size.

=== Rotherham United ===
On 23 January 2014, Smallwood joined Rotherham United on loan for the remainder of the 2013–14 season. Shortly after arriving at Rotherham United, Smallwood quickly went straight into the first team; he was sent-off for a late challenge on Billy Knott, as Rotherham United beat Port Vale 1–0 on 21 April 2014. As a result of the challenge, Smallwood had to serve a three-match suspension, missing the last two games of the season and one match in the play-offs.

Smallwood scored the winning penalty in the shoot-out after taking the fifth penalty to win it as Rotherham secured promotion with a penalty shoot-out victory against Leyton Orient. After the match, Smallwood said it was the first time he had taken a penalty in his professional career. As a result of his good performance at Rotherham United, the club made a bid to sign Smallwood in early July, only to be rejected by Middlesbrough.

Initially signed in an emergency loan deal, Smallwood signed for Rotherham United on a permanent basis after Middlesbrough accepted a £175,000 bid for him. Smallwood scored his first ever goal for Rotherham United in their 3–3 home draw with Derby County with a free-kick from the edge of the area. In his first full season with Rotherham, he won the Player of the Season award having made 41 appearances, scoring once.

On 31 August 2016, new Rotherham United manager Alan Stubbs sent Smallwood out on a season long loan to Scunthorpe United for the last year of his contract. With Stubbs no longer at the club, agreement was reached to terminate the loan on 9 January 2017. Smallwood scored one goal for Scunthorpe during his loan, the final goal in a 4–0 home defeat of Southend United on 10 September 2016. Smallwood elected to leave Rotherham United at the end of his contract, turning down an extension offered by the club.

=== Blackburn Rovers ===
Smallwood signed a two-year contract with Blackburn Rovers on 20 June 2017. He scored his first goal for Blackburn in a 3–1 EFL Cup win against Coventry City on 8 August 2017. He was a member of the Blackburn side that were promoted back to the Championship at the first attempt in 2017–18 in second position. He played all 46 league matches during the campaign.

=== Hull City ===
On 11 August 2020, Smallwood signed for Hull City, on a two-year deal with an option to extend a further year. Smallwood was then named as Hull City's captain for the upcoming 2020–21 season. Smallwood played his first game for the club on 5 September 2020, in the first round of the EFL Cup away against Sunderland, which Hull won on penalties after a 0–0 draw. Hull were crowned as League One champions in his first season, as he made 27 league appearances.

He scored his first goal for Hull in a 4–1 win at Preston North End on 7 August 2021. Smallwood was released at the end of the 2021–22 season.

=== Bradford City ===
On 22 June 2022, Smallwood signed for Bradford City on a free transfer on an initial two year deal. In July 2022 he was made captain. At the end of the 2023–24 season, he triggered a contract extension.

Bradford were promoted in third place on the final day of the 2024–25 season, after a 96th-minute winner in a 1–0 home win against Fleetwood Town. He was named Bradford City's Player of the Year for the promotion season – one of 5 club awards he received. Smallwood was also included in the division's Team of the Season.

On 2 June 2025, the player said the club had not offered him a new contract and he would therefore be leaving.

=== Tranmere Rovers ===
On 14 July 2025, Smallwood signed for League Two Tranmere Rovers on a one-year deal.

On 2 February 2026, Smallwood joined fellow League Two club Bristol Rovers on loan for the remainder of the 2025–26 season. The move saw him reunite with former Rotherham United manager Steve Evans.

He was released by Tranmere Rovers upon the expiry of his contract at the end of the 2025–26 season.

=== Bristol Rovers ===
On 5 June 2026, following his successful loan spell the previous season, Smallwood agreed to join League Two club Bristol Rovers on a one-year deal.

== International career ==
He was a member of the England under-18 squad which defeated Austria 2–0 at Hartlepool United's Victoria Park on 16 April 2008.

== Career statistics ==
As of match played 21 November 2026

Appearances and goals by club, season and competition
Club	Season	League			FA Cup		League Cup		Other		Total	
Club	Season	Division	Apps	Goals	Apps	Goals	Apps	Goals	Apps	Goals	Apps	Goals
Middlesbrough	2010–11	Championship	12	1	0	0	0	0	0	0	12	1
Middlesbrough	2011–12	Championship	13	0	2	0	3	0	0	0	18	0
Middlesbrough	2012–13	Championship	22	2	2	0	4	1	0	0	28	3
Middlesbrough	2013–14	Championship	13	0	0	0	0	0	0	0	13	0
Middlesbrough	2014–15	Championship	0	0	0	0	1	0	0	0	1	0
Middlesbrough	Total		60	3	4	0	8	1	0	0	72	4
Rotherham United (loan)	2013–14	League One	18	0	0	0	0	0	2 (Note: Appearances in League One play-offs)	0	20	0
Rotherham United (loan)	2014–15	Championship	1	0	0	0	0	0	0	0	1	0
Rotherham United	2014–15	Championship	40	1	1	0	0	0	0	0	41	1
Rotherham United	2015–16	Championship	43	1	1	0	1	0	0	0	45	1
Rotherham United	2016–17	Championship	25	1	0	0	1	0	0	0	26	1
Rotherham United	Total		127	3	2	0	2	0	2	0	133	3
Scunthorpe United (loan)	2016–17	League One	16	1	1	0	0	0	2 (Note: Appearance(s) in EFL Trophy)	0	19	1
Blackburn Rovers	2017–18	League One	46	2	2	0	2	1	2	0	52	3
Blackburn Rovers	2018–19	Championship	32	0	1	0	0	0	0	0	33	0
Blackburn Rovers	2019–20	Championship	0	0	0	0	2	0	0	0	2	0
Blackburn Rovers	Total		78	2	3	0	4	1	2	0	87	3
Hull City	2020–21	League One	27	0	1	0	2	0	1	0	31	0
Hull City	2021–22	Championship	42	2	1	0	0	0	0	0	43	2
Hull City	Total		69	2	2	0	2	0	1	0	74	2
Bradford City	2022–23	League Two	45	3	1	0	2	0	4 (Note: Two appearances in EFL Trophy, two appearances in EFL League Two play-offs)	0	52	3
Bradford City	2023–24	League Two	42	1	1	0	2	0	6	0	51	1
Bradford City	2024–25	League Two	43	2	2	0	1	0	7	1	53	3
Bradford City	Total		130	6	4	0	5	0	17	1	156	7
Tranmere Rovers	2025–26	League Two	26	0	1	0	1	0	4	0	32	0
Bristol Rovers (loan)	2025–26	League Two	15	0	0	0	0	0	0	0	15	0
Bristol Rovers	2026–27	League Two	13	0	0	0	1	0	3	0	17	0
Bristol Rovers	Total		28	0	0	0	1	0	3	0	32	0
Career total			534	17	17	0	23	2	31	1	605	20

== Honours ==
Rotherham United

- Football League One play-offs: 2014

Blackburn Rovers

- EFL League One second-place promotion: 2017–18

Hull City

- EFL League One: 2020–21

Bradford City

- EFL League Two third-place promotion: 2024–25

Individual

- Rotherham United Player of the Season: 2014–15
- EFL League Two Team of the Season: 2024–25
- Bradford City Player of the Season: 2024–25
