= Tony Thompson (footballer) =

English footballer

Personal information
- Full name: Anthony Thompson
- Date of birth: 4 November 1994 (age 32)
- Place of birth: Liverpool, England
- Height: 1.83 m (6 ft 0 in)
- Position: Goalkeeper

Team information
- Current team: Prescot Cables

Youth career
- Liverpool
- –2012: Rotherham United

Senior career*
Years	Team	Apps	(Gls)
2012–2015	Rotherham United	0	(0)
2013	→ Curzon Ashton (loan)		
2014	→ Ossett Town (loan)		
2014	→ Chelmsford City (loan)	4	(0)
2015	→ Southport (loan)	7	(0)
2015–2016	Morecambe	1	(0)
2016	Chester	12	(0)
2016–2017	AFC Fylde	9	(0)
2017–2022	Altrincham	180	(0)
2022–2023	Warrington Town	47	(0)
2023–2026	Bootle	108	(0)
2026–	Prescot Cables	12	(0)
- * Club domestic league appearances and goals as of 08:53, 12 October 2026 (UTC)

Anthony Thompson (born 4 November 1994 in Liverpool, England) is an English footballer who plays as a goalkeeper for Bootle, having previously played professionally for Morecambe.

== Career ==
Thompson began his career with Liverpool before playing for Rotherham United. He then played in non-league, including for Warrington Town, where an opposition fan replaced his water bottle with urine. Thompson confronted the fan and was sent off. He later said the incident made him want to stop playing football.

== Career statistics ==
As of end of 2025–26 season

Appearances and goals by club, season and competition
Club	Season	League			FA Cup		League Cup		Other		Total	
Club	Season	Division	Apps	Goals	Apps	Goals	Apps	Goals	Apps	Goals	Apps	Goals
Rotherham United	2012–13	League Two	0	0	0	0	0	0	0	0	0	0
Rotherham United	2013–14	League One	0	0	0	0	0	0	0	0	0	0
Rotherham United	2014–15	Championship	0	0	—		0	0	—		0	0
Rotherham United	Total		0	0	0	0	0	0	0	0	0	0
Chelmsford City (loan)	2014–15	Conference South	4	0	2	0	—		—		6	0
Southport (loan)	2014–15	Conference Premier	7	0	—		—		—		7	0
Morecambe	2015–16	League Two	1	0	0	0	0	0	1 (Note: Appearances in Football League Trophy)	0	2	0
Chester	2015–16	National League	12	0	—		—		1 (Note: Appearances in Cheshire Senior Cup)	0	13	0
AFC Fylde	2016–17	National League North	9	0	1	0	—		0	0	10	0
Altrincham	2017–18	NPL Premier Division	42	0	2	0	—		5 (Note: Appearances in FA Trophy)	0	49	0
Altrincham	2018–19	National League North	32	0	2	0	—		3 (Note: One appearance in FA Trophy, two in National League North play-offs)	0	37	0
Altrincham	2019–20	National League North	27	0	6	0	—		6 (Note: Three appearances in FA Trophy, three in National League North play-offs)	0	39	0
Altrincham	2020–21	National League	42	0	1	0	—		1	0	44	0
Altrincham	2021–22	National League	37	0	1	0	—		1	0	39	0
Altrincham	Total		180	0	12	0	—		16	0	208	0
Warrington Town	2022–23	NPL Premier Division	41	0	3	0	—		6 (Note: Three appearances in FA Trophy, two in Northern Premier League play-offs, one appearance in Cheshire Senior Cup)	0	50	0
Warrington Town	2023–24	National League North	6	0	0	0	—		0	0	6	0
Warrington Town	Total		47	0	3	0	—		6	0	56	0
Bootle	2023–24	NPL Division One West	28	0	0	0	—		3 (Note: Two appearances in Liverpool Senior Cup, one appearance in NPL Division One West play-offs)	0	31	0
Bootle	2024–25	NPL Division One West	39	0	1	0	—		1 (Note: Appearance(s) in Liverpool Senior Cup)	0	41	0
Bootle	2025–26	NPL Division One West	41	0	5	0	—		1	0	47	0
Bootle	Total		108	0	6	0	0	0	5	0	119	0
Career total			368	0	24	0	0	0	29	0	421	0
