= Nicky Walker (footballer, born 1994) =

English footballer

Personal information
- Full name: Nicholas Thomas Walker
- Date of birth: 8 September 1994 (age 32)
- Place of birth: Rotherham, England
- Position: Winger

Team information
- Current team: Liversedge

Youth career
- 2011–2013: Rotherham United

Senior career*
Years	Team	Apps	(Gls)
2013–2015	Rotherham United	2	(0)
2013	→ Barrow (loan)	4	(0)
2014	→ Wycombe Wanderers (loan)	0	(0)
2014–2015	→ Grimsby Town (loan)	0	(0)
2015–2016	Boston United	15	(4)
2016–2017	Buxton		
2017–2018	Shaw Lane		
2018	Gainsborough Trinity	12	(3)
2018–2020	Boston United	37	(9)
2020	→ Gainsborough Trinity (loan)	8	(4)
2020–2021	Alfreton Town	12	(0)
2021–2022	Liversedge	37	(1)
2022	Whitby Town	7	(0)
2022	Guiseley	9	(1)
2022–	Liversedge	0	(0)
- * Club domestic league appearances and goals as of 15:42, 29 December 2022 (UTC)

Nicholas Thomas Walker (born 8 September 1994) is an English professional footballer who plays as a winger for Liversedge.

He has notably played as a professional for Rotherham United, Barrow, Wycombe Wanderers and Grimsby Town, despite only four appearances combined during this period. He has since gone on to play non-league football for Boston United, Buxton, Shaw Lane, Gainsborough Trinity, Alfreton Town, Whitby Town and Guiseley.

== Career ==
=== Rotherham United ===
Walker started his career with Rotherham United, starting a two-year scholarship with the club in the summer of 2011. He made his professional debut whilst still a youth player on 17 November 2012, in a 4–2 win over Cheltenham Town in League Two, replacing Courtney Cameron as a substitute. Soon after, Walker was soon linked with many Championship clubs keen to sign him.

At the 2012–13 season, Walker signed his first professional contract at the club. Shortly after, Walker switched number shirt from thirty-two to twenty-nine.

On 25 October 2013, Walker joined Conference North side Barrow a one-month loan deal. Following his loan spell at Barrow came to an end, Walker contract with Rotherham United was extended for another season.

On 31 July 2014, Walker joined League Two side Wycombe Wanderers on loan for three months, along with teammate Daniel Rowe. However, Walker didn't start first team place at Wycombe Wanderers and stayed at the club until his loan came to an end.

On 28 November 2014 it was announced that Walker had joined Conference Premier side Grimsby Town on loan until January 2015.

=== Boston United ===
On 1 January 2015 after making no appearances on loan at Grimsby Town, he was released by Rotherham United, he joined Conference North side Boston United on a free transfer.

=== Gainsborough Trinity ===
On 28 February 2018 Walker signed for Gainsborough Trinity of the National League North. He made his debut on 10 March, scoring a 94th-minute winner against Kidderminster Harriers.

=== Northern Premier League ===
In June 2022, following a title-winning campaign with Liversedge, Walker joined Whitby Town. In September, he signed for Guiseley before returning to Liversedge for an undisclosed fee in December.

== Career statistics ==
As of match played on 4 January 2015.

Club	Season	League			FA Cup		League Cup		Other		Total	
Club	Season	Division	Apps	Goals	Apps	Goals	Apps	Goals	Apps	Goals	Apps	Goals
Rotherham United	2012–13	League Two	2	0	1	0	0	0	0	0	3	0
Barrow (loan)	2013–14	Conference North	4	0	2	0	0	0	0	0	6	0
Wycombe Wanderers (loan)	2013–14	League Two	0	0	0	0	0	0	0	0	0	0
Grimsby Town (loan)	2014–15	Conference Premier	0	0	0	0	0	0	0	0	0	0
Boston United	2014–15	Conference North	2	3	0	0	0	0	0	0	2	3
Career total			8	3	3	0	0	0	0	0	11	3
