= 2014 Football League play-offs =

Football League play-offs
- Season: 2013–14
- Champions: Queens Park Rangers (Championship); Rotherham United (League One); Fleetwood Town (League Two)
- Matches: 15
- Goals: 34 (2.27 per match)
- Biggest home win: Derby County 4–1 Brighton & Hove Albion (Championship)
- Biggest away win: Brighton & Hove Albion 1–2 Derby County (Championship)
- Highest scoring: Derby County 4–1 Brighton & Hove Albion (5 goals)
- Highest attendance: 87,348 – Derby County v Queens Park Rangers (Championship Final)
- Lowest attendance: 4,581 – Burton Albion v Southend United (League Two semi-final)
- Average attendance: 20,504

The Football League play-offs for the 2013–14 season (referred to as the Sky Bet Play-Offs for sponsorship reasons) were held in May 2014 with all finals being staged at Wembley Stadium in London.

The play-offs began at the semi-final stage with all semi-finals being played over two legs, contested by the teams who finished in 3rd, 4th, 5th and 6th place in the Football League Championship and League One and the 4th, 5th, 6th and 7th-placed teams in the League Two table. The winners of the semi-finals then advanced to the finals, with the winner of the final gaining promotion for the following season.

== Background ==
The Football League play-offs have been held every year since 1987. They take place for each division following the conclusion of the regular season and are contested by the four clubs finishing below the automatic promotion places.

== Championship ==
Pos	Team	Pld	W	D	L	GF	GA	GD	Pts
3	Derby County	46	25	10	11	84	52	+32	85
4	Queens Park Rangers	46	23	11	12	60	44	+16	80
5	Wigan Athletic	46	21	10	15	61	48	+13	73
6	Brighton & Hove Albion	46	19	15	12	55	40	+15	72

=== Semi-finals ===
==== First leg ====
8 May 2014
19:45 BST

Brighton & Hove Albion	1–2	Derby County
Lingard 18'	BBC Report	Martin 29' (pen.); Kuszczak 45+2' (o.g.)

Falmer Stadium, Falmer
Attendance: 27,118
Referee: Roger East
9 May 2014
19:45 BST

Wigan Athletic	0–0	Queens Park Rangers
	BBC Report

DW Stadium, Wigan
Attendance: 14,560
Referee: Mike Jones

==== Second leg ====
11 May 2014
17:15 BST

Derby County	4–1	Brighton & Hove Albion
Hughes 34'; Martin 56'; Thorne 76'; Hendrick 87'	BBC Report	LuaLua 89'

Pride Park Stadium, Derby
Attendance: 32,602
Referee: Craig Pawson

Derby County won 6–2 on aggregate.

12 May 2014
19:45 BST

Queens Park Rangers	2–1 (a.e.t.)	Wigan Athletic
Austin 73' (pen.), 96'	BBC Report	Perch 9'

Loftus Road, London
Attendance: 17,061
Referee: Mark Clattenburg

Queens Park Rangers won 2–1 on aggregate.

=== Final ===
24 May 2014
15:00 BST

Derby County	0–1	Queens Park Rangers
	Report	Zamora 90'

Wembley Stadium, London
Attendance: 87,348
Referee: Lee Mason

== League One ==
Pos	Team	Pld	W	D	L	GF	GA	GD	Pts
3	Leyton Orient	46	25	11	10	85	45	+40	86
4	Rotherham United	46	24	14	8	86	58	+28	86
5	Preston North End	46	23	16	7	72	46	+26	85
6	Peterborough United	46	23	5	18	72	58	+14	74

=== Semi-finals ===
==== First leg ====
10 May 2014
12:15 BST

Peterborough United	1–1	Leyton Orient
Assombalonga 16'	BBC Report	Odubajo 72'

London Road, Peterborough
Attendance: 9,519
Referee: Graham Salisbury
10 May 2014
17:15 BST

Preston North End	1–1	Rotherham United
Garner 49'	BBC Report	Revell 21'

Deepdale, Preston
Attendance: 17,221
Referee: Ian Williamson

==== Second leg ====
13 May 2014
19:45 BST

Leyton Orient	2–1	Peterborough United
Cox 60'; Dagnall 88'	BBC Report	Washington 90+2'

Brisbane Road, London
Attendance: 8,545
Referee: Mick Russell

Leyton Orient won 3–2 on aggregate.

15 May 2014
19:45 BST

Rotherham United	3–1	Preston North End
Thomas 24'; Frecklington 34'; Agard 67'	BBC Report	Gallagher 16'

New York Stadium, Rotherham
Attendance: 11,576
Referee: Keith Stroud

Rotherham United won 4–2 on aggregate.

=== Final ===
25 May 2014
15:00 BST

Leyton Orient	2–2 (a.e.t.)	Rotherham United
Odubajo 34'; Cox 39'	BBC report	Revell 55', 60'
Penalties
James (penalty scored); Lundstram (penalty scored); Clarke (penalty scored); Baudry (penalty missed); Dagnall (penalty missed)	3–4	(penalty scored) Agard; (penalty missed) Frecklington; (penalty scored) Pringle; (penalty scored) Tavernier; (penalty scored) Smallwood

Wembley Stadium, London
Attendance: 43,401
Referee: David Coote

== League Two ==
Pos	Team	Pld	W	D	L	GF	GA	GD	Pts	Qualification
4	Fleetwood Town (O, P)	46	22	10	14	66	52	+14	76	Play-offs
5	Southend United	46	19	15	12	56	39	+17	72	Play-offs
6	Burton Albion	46	19	15	12	47	42	+5	72	Play-offs
7	York City	46	18	17	11	52	41	+11	71	Play-offs

Updated to match(es) played on 3 May 2014. Source: BBC Sport
Rules for classification: 1) Points; 2) Goal difference; 3) Number of goals scored
(O) Play-off winners; (P) Promoted

=== Semi-finals ===
==== First leg ====
11 May 2014
12:00 BST

Burton Albion	1–0	Southend United
McGurk 45'	BBC Report

Pirelli Stadium, Burton upon Trent
Attendance: 4,581
Referee: Oliver Langford
12 May 2014 (Note: Originally to be played on 10 May (19:30) but postponed due to a waterlogged pitch.)
19:45 BST

York City	0–1	Fleetwood Town
	BBC Report	Blair 50'

Bootham Crescent, York
Attendance: 5,124
Referee: Carl Boyeson

==== Second leg ====
16 May 2014
19:45 BST

Fleetwood Town	0–0	York City
	BBC Report

Highbury Stadium, Fleetwood
Attendance: 5,194
Referee: Scott Duncan

Fleetwood Town won 1–0 on aggregate.

17 May 2014
12:00 BST

Southend United	2–2	Burton Albion
Leonard 32'; Straker 39'	BBC Report	Holness 21'; McGurk 69'

Roots Hall, Southend-on-Sea
Attendance: 9,696
Referee: Paul Tierney

Burton Albion won 3–2 on aggregate.

=== Final ===
26 May 2014
15:00 BST

Burton Albion	0–1	Fleetwood Town
	BBC Report	Sarcevic 75'

Wembley Stadium, London
Attendance: 14,007
Referee: Michael Naylor

== See also ==
- 2014 Conference Premier play-off final
