= Ben Pringle =

English footballer (born 1988)

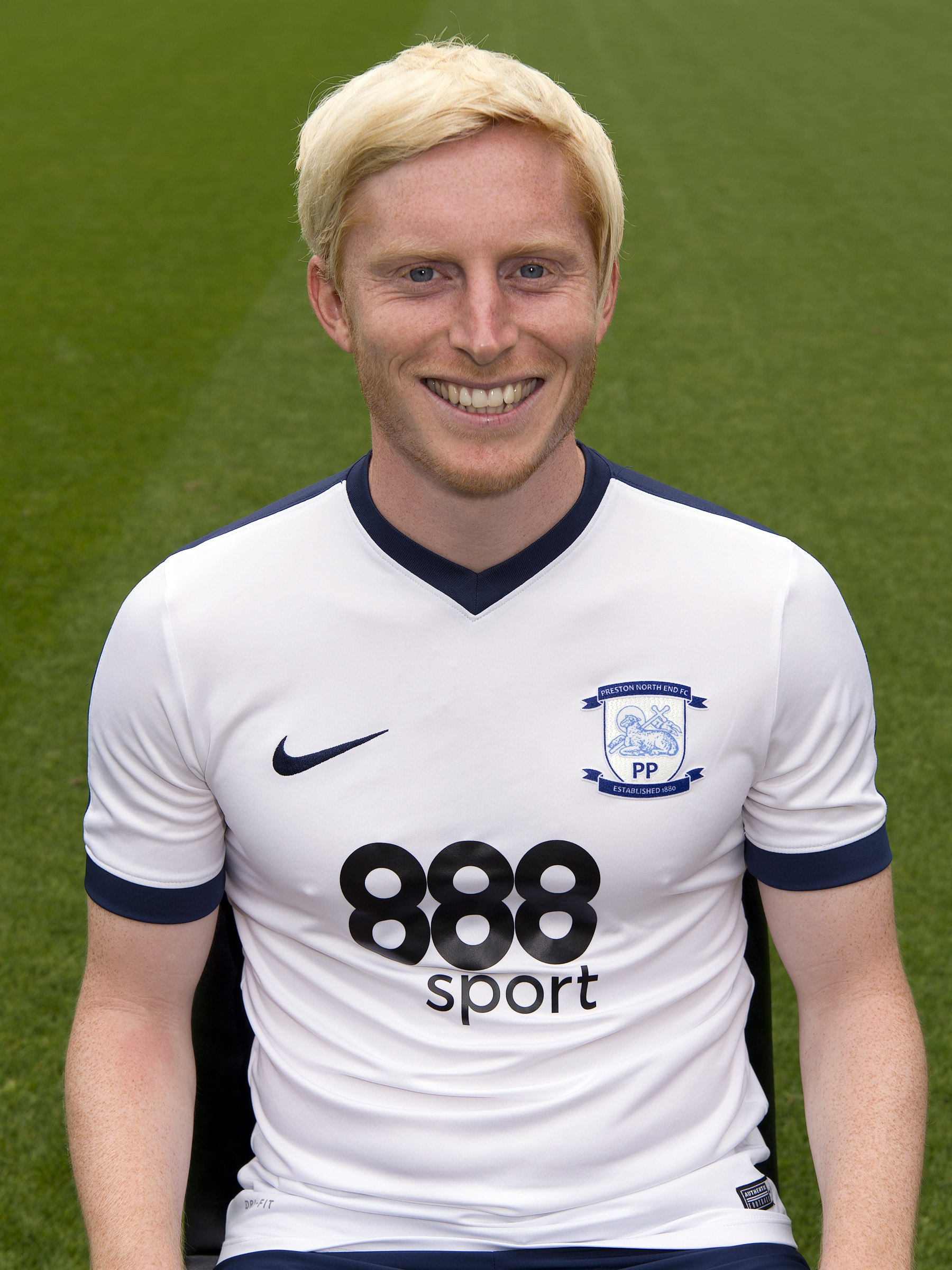
- Pringle with Preston North End in 2016

Personal information
- Full name: Benjamin Philip Pringle
- Date of birth: 25 July 1988 (age 38)
- Place of birth: Whitley Bay, England
- Height: 5 ft 9 in (1.74 m)
- Position: Midfielder

Youth career
- Wallsend Boys Club
- 2006–2007: West Bromwich Albion

Senior career*
Years	Team	Apps	(Gls)
2007–2008	Newcastle Blue Star		
2007–2008	Morpeth Town		
2008–2009	Ilkeston Town	42	(4)
2009–2011	Derby County	20	(0)
2011	→ Torquay United (loan)	5	(0)
2011–2015	Rotherham United	147	(19)
2015–2016	Fulham	15	(2)
2016	→ Ipswich Town (loan)	10	(2)
2016–2019	Preston North End	10	(0)
2018	→ Oldham Athletic (loan)	13	(1)
2018–2019	→ Grimsby Town (loan)	15	(0)
2019	→ Tranmere Rovers (loan)	13	(0)
2019–2020	Gillingham	10	(0)
2020–2021	Morecambe	11	(0)
2021–2023	Altrincham	59	(1)
2023–2024	Fleetwood United	15	(2)
2024–2026	Precision	19	(1)
- * Club domestic league appearances and goals as of 08:10, 2 May 2025 (UTC)

Benjamin Philip Pringle (born 25 July 1988) is an English football manager and former midfielder who is the head coach for UAE Second Division League club Precision.

He has notably played for Derby County, Rotherham United, Fulham and Preston North End with further spells in the Football League with Torquay United, Ipswich Town, Oldham Athletic, Grimsby Town, Tranmere Rovers, Gillingham and Morecambe. Prior to his professional career he had played at non-League level for Newcastle Blue Star, Morpeth Town and Ilkeston Town.

== Early life ==
Pringle was born and raised in Whitley Bay, Tyne and Wear.

== Career ==
=== Early career ===
Pringle started his career at Wallsend Boys Club, before joining the youth system at West Bromwich Albion.

After being released by West Bromwich Albion, he joined Non League side Newcastle Blue Star before a spell at Morpeth Town.

=== Ilkeston Town ===
In 2008 joined Ilkeston Town. At Ilkeston he made a total of 54 competitive first team appearances, scoring 6 goals.

=== Derby County ===
In May 2009 it was announced he was moving to Derby County on a one-year deal, with the move set to be completed in July.

He made his Derby debut as an 80th-minute substitute against Peterborough United on 8 August 2009. The following game of the 2009–10 football season, Pringle started his first game for Derby in the League Cup 2–1 loss to League Two side Rotherham United.

Pringle signed an extension to his Derby deal to take him through to the end of the 2010–11 season on 11 December 2009. Pringle was captain of the Derby County reserves side that won the 2009–10 Central League Central Section title and was also named the club's Young Player of the Season for the campaign. He was handed his first League start in the final game of the 2009–10 season against Cardiff City in a 2–0 win and earned the supporter's Man of the Match award. In February 2011, Pringle's contract was extended until summer 2012.

==== Torquay United (loan) ====
In March 2011, Pringle joined then League Two outfit Torquay United on a months loan. Pringle spent just 19 days of the loan at Torquay, playing five games, but returned to Derby after expressing a desire to fight for a place in the Derby first team rather than remain at Plainmoor.

Upon his return to Derby, despite having had his contract extended at the end of the 2010–11 campaign, Pringle was told he was free to find another club.

=== Rotherham United ===
On 3 June 2011, it was revealed he had agreed personal terms with Rotherham United. The transfer was confirmed later that day, with Pringle joining The Millers on a free transfer, signing a two-year contract. He made his first team debut for Rotherham at home to Oxford United on 6 August 2011, and scored his first goal for the club in a 2–1 win over Crewe Alexandra on 16 August.

He had made nine appearances for Rotherham up until mid-October but following his substitute appearance versus Bristol Rovers he had not played again for them as of mid-February. However, he was an unused sub in Rotherham's game against Burton Albion on 18 February. Pringle's form contributed greatly to the clubs' automatic promotion to League One at the end of the 2012–13 season.

On 18 January 2013, Pringle signed a new two-and-a-half-year contract with Rotherham. His goals and assists during the 2013–14 season helped Rotherham reach the League One play-off final. Pringle played in the final, and after a 2–2 draw, Rotherham earned promotion after beating Leyton Orient 4–3 on penalties to earn a second successive promotion.

At the end of the 2013–14 season, Pringle was voted in the 2013–14 Football League One PFA Team of the Year.

On 9 August 2014, Pringle started for Rotherham in their opening fixture of The Championship season in a 1–0 defeat against his former club Derby County. On 23 August 2014, Pringle scored his first goal in the Championship with a winner in Rotherham's 1–0 victory against Millwall.

On 9 January 2015, Rotherham agreed a fee with Millwall for Pringle, however Pringle turned down the move to the club. On 27 January 2015, Pringle scored his second goal of the season in a 4–2 victory against Bolton Wanderers where he was also named man of the match.

=== Fulham ===
On 19 June 2015, Pringle signed for Fulham on a two-year contract, joining on the same day as goalkeeper Andy Lonergan.

==== Ipswich Town (loan) ====
Pringle joined Ipswich Town on an initial one-month loan on 12 February 2016.

=== Preston North End ===
On 4 July 2016, Pringle signed for Preston North End on a three-year contract for an undisclosed fee.

On 31 August 2018, Pringle joined Grimsby Town on a season-long loan. However, his loan was cut short, with Pringle joining League Two rivals Tranmere Rovers on 22 January 2019

He was released by Preston at the end of the 2018–19 season.

=== Gillingham ===
In September 2019, Pringle joined Gillingham on a contract intended to run until the end of the season. He went on to make 11 appearances for the Kent side in all competitions, but was released at the conclusion of the 2019–20 season.

=== Morecambe ===
On 10 August 2020, Pringle joined League Two side Morecambe on a one-year deal. He was released by the club's new manager in June 2021 after the club had won promotion through the play-offs.

=== Altrincham ===
On 3 August 2021, Pringle joined National League side Altrincham following his release from Morecambe. He was released at the end of the 2022–23 season.

=== United Arab Emirates ===
Ahead of the 2023–24 season, Pringle joined Fleetwood United as a player/coach, the United Arab Emirates-based sister club to Fleetwood Town. He captained the team and helped them to win the UAE Second Division League title, which brought promotion to the UAE First Division League.

In September 2024, Pringle joined Precision Football following their promotion to the UAE Second Division. Pringle announced his retirement in May 2026 and became the head coach at Precisionn the following month.

== Honours ==
Ilkeston Town

- Northern Premier League Premier Division play-offs: 2009

Rotherham United

- Football League Two second-place promotion: 2012–13
- Football League One play-offs: 2014

Tranmere Rovers

- EFL League Two play-offs: 2019

Morecambe

- EFL League Two play-offs: 2021

Fleetwood United

- UAE Second Division League: 2023–24

Individual

- Ilkeston Town Player of the Year: 2008–09
- Derby County Young Player of the Year: 2009–10
- PFA Team of the Year: 2013–14 League One
