= 2008–09 Rotherham United F.C. season =

Rotherham United
2008–09 season
- Manager: Mark Robins
- Stadium: Don Valley Stadium
- League Two: 14th
- FA Cup: First round
- Football League Cup: Fourth round
- Johnstones Paint Trophy: Northern Final

This page shows the progress of Rotherham United F.C. in the 2008–09 football season. During the season, Rotherham competed in League Two in the English league system.

== League table ==
Pos	Team	Pld	W	D	L	GF	GA	GD	Pts
12	Darlington	46	20	12	14	61	44	+17	62 (Note: Darlington deducted 10 points for entering administration.)
13	Lincoln City	46	14	17	15	53	52	+1	59
14	Rotherham United	46	21	12	13	60	46	+14	58 (Note: Rotherham United deducted 17 points for leaving administration without a Company Voluntary Agreement.)
15	Aldershot Town	46	14	12	20	59	80	−21	54
16	Accrington Stanley	46	13	11	22	42	59	−17	50

Source: The Football League
Rules for classification: 1) points; 2) goal difference; 3) number of goals scored.

== Results ==
=== Football League Two ===
9 August 2008 1	Rotherham United	1–0	Lincoln City	Sheffield
	Reid 44'			Stadium: Don Valley Stadium; Attendance: 4,748

16 August 2008 2	Morecambe	1–3	Rotherham United	Morecambe
	Wainwright 77'		Lynch 8', 90'; Taylor 40'	Stadium: Christie Park; Attendance: 2,606

23 August 2008 3	Rotherham United	3–1	Chester City	Sheffield
	Sharps 2'; Reid 14'; Rhodes 27'		Ellison 18'	Stadium: Don Valley Stadium; Attendance: 3,462

30 August 2008 4	Brentford	0–0	Rotherham United	London
				Stadium: Griffin Park; Attendance: 4,381

6 September 2008 5	Chesterfield	1–0	Rotherham United	Chesterfield
	Goodall 90'			Stadium: Saltergate; Attendance: 4,951

13 September 2008 6	Rotherham United	2–2	Rochdale	Sheffield
	McArdle 77' (o.g.); Reid 90'		Rhodes 43'; Buckley 51'; Thorpe (red card) 69'	Stadium: Don Valley Stadium; Attendance: 3,569

20 September 2008 7	Rotherham United	1–0	Luton Town	Sheffield
	Rhodes 61'			Stadium: Don Valley Stadium; Attendance: 4,095

27 September 2008 8	Dagenham & Redbridge	1–1	Rotherham United	London
	Benson 50'		Burchill 84'	Stadium: Victoria Road; Attendance: 1,805

4 October 2008 9	Rotherham United	4–1	Grimsby Town	Sheffield
	Reid 49'; Hudson 57'; Cummins 69'; Barker 80'		Boshell 29'	Stadium: Don Valley Stadium; Attendance: 3,889

11 October 2008 10	Bournemouth	0–0	Rotherham United	Bournemouth
				Stadium: Fitness First Stadium; Attendance: 4,530

18 October 2008 11	Rotherham United	3–4	Barnet	Sheffield
	Fenton 7'; Sharps 70'; Cummins 69'; Burchill 81' (pen.)		Medley 18'; Adomah 36'; Akurang 57', 62'; Porter (red card) 30'	Stadium: Don Valley Stadium; Attendance: 3,801

21 October 2008 12	Bury	1–2	Rotherham United	Bury
	Scott 30'		Reid 2'; Broughton 11'	Stadium: Gigg Lane; Attendance: 2,362

25 October 2008 13	Macclesfield Town	1–2	Rotherham United	Macclesfield
	Green 90'; Jennings (red card) 90'		Tonge 5'; Sharps 90' (red card) 90'	Stadium: Moss Rose; Attendance: 2,020

28 October 2008 14	Rotherham United	0–1	Darlington	Sheffield
			Ravenhill 61'	Stadium: Don Valley Stadium; Attendance: 3,322

1 November 2008 15	Rotherham United	0–0	Wycombe Wanderers	Sheffield
				Stadium: Don Valley Stadium; Attendance: 3,471

15 November 2008 16	Gillingham	4–0	Rotherham United	Gillingham
	King 6'; Miller 58'; Richards 78'; Cumbers 88'		Harrison (red card) 35'	Stadium: Priestfield; Attendance: 5,304

22 November 2008 17	Rotherham United	0–2	Bradford City	Sheffield
			O'Brien 71'; Law 76'	Stadium: Don Valley Stadium; Attendance: 4,586

25 November 2008 18	Exeter City	1–1	Rotherham United	Exeter
	Watson 41'		Reid 66' (pen.)	Stadium: St James Park; Attendance: 3,402

6 December 2008 19	Shrewsbury Town	1–0	Rotherham United	Shrewsbury
	Holt 72'		Broughton (red card) 59'; Stockdale (red card) 70'	Stadium: Prostar Stadium; Attendance: 5,314

20 December 2008 20	Accrington Stanley	1–3	Rotherham United	Accrington
	Procter 33'		Burchill 6' (pen.), 11'; Broughton 88'	Stadium: Crown Ground; Attendance: 1,172

26 December 2008 21	Rotherham United	1–0	Port Vale	Sheffield
	Joseph (red card) 24'; Broughton 67'			Stadium: Don Valley Stadium; Attendance: 4,350

28 December 2008 22	Notts County	0–3	Rotherham United	Nottingham
			Reid 5'; Broughton 47'; Cummins 52'	Stadium: Meadow Lane; Attendance: 6,686

3 January 2009 23	Rotherham United	1–1	Dagenham & Redbridge	Sheffield
	Sharps 90'		Ritchie 48'	Stadium: Don Valley Stadium; Attendance: 3,307

17 January 2009 24	Rotherham United	1–0	Bournemouth	Sheffield
	Hudson 18'		Hollands (red card) 64'	Stadium: Don Valley Stadium; Attendance: 3,270

24 January 2009 25	Grimsby Town	3–0	Rotherham United	Grimsby
	Widdowson 56'; Proudlock 73' (pen.); Sinclair 84'			Stadium: Blundell Park; Attendance: 4,559

27 January 2009 26	Darlington	1–0	Rotherham United	Darlington
	Carlton 22'; Hulbert (red card) 57'			Stadium: The Darlington Arena; Attendance: 2,431

31 January 2009 27	Rotherham United	2–0	Macclesfield Town	Sheffield
	Hudson 12'; Reid 76'			Stadium: Don Valley Stadium; Attendance: 2,945

14 February 2009 28	Rotherham United	2–0	Gillingham	Sheffield
	Clarke 25'; Green 81'			Stadium: Don Valley Stadium; Attendance: 2,757

23 February 2009 29	Wycombe Wanderers	0–0	Rotherham United	High Wycombe
				Stadium: Adams Park; Attendance: 3,789

28 February 2009 30	Lincoln City	0–1	Rotherham United	Lincoln
			Cummins 65'	Stadium: Sincil Bank; Attendance: 4,336

7 March 2009 31	Rotherham United	0–0	Brentford	Sheffield
				Stadium: Don Valley Stadium; Attendance: 3,406

10 March 2009 32	Chester City	1–5	Rotherham United	Chester
	Ellison 14'		Reid 26' (pen.), 50', 72'; Cummins 38'; Broughton 45'	Stadium: Deva Stadium; Attendance: 1,235

14 March 2009 33	Rochdale	1–2	Rotherham United	Rochdale
	Le Fondre 75'		Reid 50'; Taylor 71'	Stadium: Spotland; Attendance: 3,201

17 March 2009 34	Rotherham United	1–2	Aldershot Town	Sheffield
	Clarke 78'		Grant 15', 39'	Stadium: Don Valley Stadium; Attendance: 2,769

21 March 2009 35	Rotherham United	3–0	Chesterfield	Sheffield
	Reid 38', 55'; Mills 83'		Talbot (red card) 79'	Stadium: Don Valley Stadium; Attendance: 4,658

24 March 2009 36	Rotherham United	1–1	Bury	Sheffield
	Reid 83' (pen.)		Sodje 90'	Stadium: Don Valley Stadium; Attendance: 2,890

28 March 2009 37	Rotherham United	0–0	Accrington Stanley	Sheffield
				Stadium: Don Valley Stadium; Attendance: 2,804

31 March 2009 38	Luton Town	2–4	Rotherham United	Luton
	Martin 42'; Hall 70'		Reid 11'; Broughton 38'; Harrison 53'; Hudson 87'	Stadium: Kenilworth Road; Attendance: 5,975

4 April 2009 39	Aldershot Town	0–1	Rotherham United	Aldershot
			Reid 11'	Stadium: EBB Stadium; Attendance: 2,643

7 April 2009 40	Barnet	2–0	Rotherham United	London
	Furlong 70', 81'			Stadium: Underhill; Attendance: 1,508

11 April 2009 41	Rotherham United	2–1	Notts County	Sheffield
	Hudson 44'; Reid 69'		Forte 75'	Stadium: Don Valley Stadium; Attendance: 2,945

13 April 2009 42	Port Vale	0–0	Rotherham United	Stoke on Trent
				Stadium: Vale Park; Attendance: 4,814

18 April 2009 43	Rotherham United	1–2	Shrewsbury Town	Sheffield
	Taylor 70'		Chadwick 44'; Sharps 76' (o.g.)	Stadium: Don Valley Stadium; Attendance: 3,106

21 April 2009 44	Rotherham United	3–2	Morecambe	Sheffield
	R.Taylor 45'; J.Taylor 80'; Burchill 89' (pen.)		O'Carroll 52'; Bentley 90'	Stadium: Don Valley Stadium; Attendance: 2,078

25 April 2009 45	Bradford City	3–0	Rotherham United	Bradford
	Thorne 12', 32'; Jones 73'			Stadium: Coral Windows Stadium; Attendance: 13,242

2 May 2009 46	Rotherham United	0–1	Exeter City	Sheffield
	Tonge (red card) 75'		Logan 71'	Stadium: Don Valley Stadium; Attendance: 6,184

=== FA Cup ===
8 November 2008 Round 1	Aldershot Town	1–1	Rotherham United	Aldershot
	Grant 90'		Cummins 54'	Stadium: EBB Stadium; Attendance: 2,632

18 November 2008 Round 1 replay	Rotherham United	0–3	Aldershot Town	Sheffield
			Hudson 15', 81'; Morgan 55'	Stadium: Don Valley Stadium; Attendance: 2,431

=== League Cup ===
12 August 2008 Round 1	Sheffield Wednesday	2–2 (a.e.t.) (3–5 p)	Rotherham United	Sheffield
	Esajas 14', 117'		Rhodes 15'; Reid 119'	Stadium: Hillsborough; Attendance: 16,298

26 August 2008 Round 2	Rotherham United	0–0 (a.e.t.) (4–3 p)	Wolverhampton Wanderers	Sheffield
				Stadium: Don Valley Stadium; Attendance: 5,404

23 September 2008 Round 3	Rotherham United	3–1	Southampton	Sheffield
	Fenton 20'; Harrison 56'; Broughton 69'		John 61'	Stadium: Don Valley Stadium; Attendance: 5,147

11 November 2008 Round 4	Stoke City	2–0	Rotherham United	Stoke on Trent
	Whelan 21'; Pugh 59'			Stadium: Britannia Stadium; Attendance: 15,458

=== Football League Trophy ===
8 October 2008 Northern Section Round 2	Rotherham United	4–2	Leeds United	Sheffield
	Sharps 17'; Hudson 44'; Broughton 48'; Fenton 53'		Howson 31'; Showunmi 56'	Stadium: Don Valley Stadium; Attendance: 4,658

4 November 2008 Northern Section Quarter Final	Rotherham United	2–0	Leicester City	Sheffield
	Broughton 45'; Tonge 58'			Stadium: Don Valley Stadium; Attendance: 4,255

16 December 2008 Northern Section Semi Final	Rotherham United	1–1 (4–2 p)	Darlington	Sheffield
	Harrison 74'		Foster 35'	Stadium: Don Valley Stadium; Attendance: 2,706

20 January 2009 Northern Section Final First Leg	Scunthorpe United	2–0	Rotherham United	Scunthorpe
	Woolford 60'; Pearce 67'			Stadium: Glanford Park; Attendance: 6,038

17 February 2009 Northern Section Final Second Leg	Rotherham United	0–1 (0–3 agg.)	Scunthorpe United	Sheffield
			Hooper 74'	Stadium: Don Valley Stadium; Attendance: 6,555

== Players ==
=== First-team squad ===
Includes all players who were awarded squad numbers during the season.

Note: Flags indicate national team as defined under FIFA eligibility rules; some limited exceptions apply. Players may hold more than one non-FIFA nationality.

No.	Pos.	Nation	Player
1	GK	(England) ENG	Andy Warrington
2	MF	(England) ENG	Dale Tonge
3	DF	(England) ENG	Mark Lynch
4	MF	(England) ENG	Danny Harrison
5	DF	(England) ENG	Ian Sharps
6	DF	(England) ENG	Nick Fenton
7	MF	(Republic of Ireland) IRL	Micky Cummins
8	MF	(England) ENG	Peter Holmes
9	FW	(Scotland) SCO	Mark Burchill
10	MF	(England) ENG	Mark Hudson
11	MF	(England) ENG	Stephen Brogan
12	DF	(Antigua and Barbuda) ATG	Marc Joseph
14	MF	(England) ENG	Andy Todd
15	MF	(England) ENG	Alex Rhodes
16	FW	(England) ENG	Jamie Yates

No.	Pos.	Nation	Player
17	FW	(England) ENG	Marc Newsham
18	DF	(England) ENG	David Haggerty
19	DF	(England) ENG	Jamie Green
20	FW	(England) ENG	Ryan Taylor
21	FW	(England) ENG	Tom Cahill
22	FW	(England) ENG	Drewe Broughton
23	FW	(England) ENG	Reuben Reid
24	DF	(England) ENG	Andrew Nicholas
25	DF	(England) ENG	Pablo Mills
26	FW	(Spain) ESP	Omar García
27	FW	(England) ENG	Jamie Clarke
28	MF	(England) ENG	Jason Taylor
29	FW	(England) ENG	Richie Barker
30	GK	(Wales) WAL	Steven Cann

=== Left club during season ===
Note: Flags indicate national team as defined under FIFA eligibility rules; some limited exceptions apply. Players may hold more than one non-FIFA nationality.

No.	Pos.	Nation	Player
31	GK	(England) ENG	Jamie Annerson (returned to parent club Sheffield United following loan spell)
32	GK	(England) ENG	David Stockdale (returned to parent club Fulham following loan spell)
31	FW	(England) ENG	Simon Thomas (returned to parent club Crystal Palace following loan spell)
