= 2011–12 Rotherham United F.C. season =

Rotherham United F.C.
2011–12 season
- Chairman: Tony Stewart
- Manager: Andy Scott (sacked 19 March 2012); Darren Patterson (caretaker to 10 April 2012); Steve Evans
- League Two: 10th
- FA Cup: Second round
- League Cup: First round
- Football League Trophy: Second round (North)
- Top goalscorer: League: Lewis Grabban (17); All: Lewis Grabban (20)
- Highest home attendance: League: 5,368 vs Bradford City (2 January 2012); All: 6,737 vs Sheffield United (4 October 2011)
- Lowest home attendance: League/All: 2,447 vs Crewe Alexandra (6 March 2012)
- Average home league attendance: 3,498
Home colours	Away colours

The 2011–12 season was Rotherham United's 87th season in their existence and the fourth consecutive season in League Two. Along with competing in League Two, the club also participated in the FA Cup, the League Cup and the Football League Trophy.

== League table ==
Pos	Team	Pld	W	D	L	GF	GA	GD	Pts
8	Gillingham	46	20	10	16	79	62	+17	70
9	Oxford United	46	17	17	12	59	48	+11	68
10	Rotherham United	46	18	13	15	67	63	+4	67
11	Aldershot Town	46	19	9	18	54	52	+2	66
12	Port Vale	46	20	9	17	68	60	+8	59 (Note: On 9 March Port Vale were deducted ten points for entering administration.)

Updated to match(es) played on 5 May 2012. Source: BBC Sport
Rules for classification: 1) Points; 2) Goal difference; 3) Number of goals scored

== Squad statistics ==
=== Appearances and goals ===
No.	Pos	Nat	Player	Total		League Two		FA Cup		League Cup		FL Trophy	
No.	Pos	Nat	Player	Apps	Goals	Apps	Goals	Apps	Goals	Apps	Goals	Apps	Goals
2	DF	(England) ENG	Dale Tonge	36	0	28+4	0	1+1	0	0+1	0	1+0	0
3	DF	(England) ENG	Tom Newey	24	0	15+5	0	2+0	0	1+0	0	1+0	0
4	MF	(England) ENG	Danny Harrison	45	2	35+6	2	2+0	0	1+0	0	1+0	0
5	DF	(England) ENG	Ryan Cresswell	17	4	13+3	4	0+0	0	1+0	0	0+0	0
6	DF	(England) ENG	Luke Foster	6	0	1+4	0	1+0	0	0+0	0	0+0	0
7	MF	(England) ENG	Gareth Evans	34	7	29+3	7	1+0	0	0+1	0	0+0	0
8	MF	(England) ENG	Jason Taylor	42	2	38+1	2	1+0	0	1+0	0	1+0	0
9	FW	(England) ENG	Alex Revell	43	11	40+0	10	2+0	0	0+0	0	1+0	1
11	MF	(England) ENG	Danny Schofield	41	1	35+2	1	1+1	0	1+0	0	1+0	0
12	MF	(England) ENG	Marcus Marshall	17	1	8+7	1	1+0	0	1+0	0	0+0	0
15	MF	(Wales) WAL	Mark Bradley	22	1	18+3	1	0+0	0	0+0	0	1+0	0
16	FW	(England) ENG	Paul Warne	3	0	0+3	0	0+0	0	0+0	0	0+0	0
17	DF	(England) ENG	Johnny Mullins	37	2	34+1	2	1+0	0	0+0	0	0+1	0
18	MF	(England) ENG	Ben Pringle	23	4	14+7	4	0+0	0	1+0	0	1+0	0
21	GK	(England) ENG	Andy Warrington	9	0	7+0	0	0+0	0	1+0	0	1+0	0
22	DF	(Wales) WAL	Troy Brown	6	1	4+2	1	0+0	0	0+0	0	0+0	0
23	FW	(England) ENG	Lewis Grabban	47	20	39+4	17	2+0	3	1+0	0	1+0	0
24	DF	(England) ENG	Michael Raynes	36	0	31+2	0	0+1	0	1+0	0	1+0	0
29	MF	(England) ENG	Alec Denton	1	0	0+1	0	0+0	0	0+0	0	0+0	0
Players played for Rotherham this season who have now left the club:
10	FW	(England) ENG	Adam Le Fondre	5	4	4+0	4	0+0	0	1+0	0	0+0	0
20	FW	(England) ENG	Chris Holroyd	19	0	5+10	0	1+1	0	0+1	0	0+1	0
Players played for Rotherham this season on loan who returned to their parent club:
1	GK	(Ireland) EIR	Conrad Logan	21	0	19+0	0	2+0	0	0+0	0	0+0	0
1	GK	(Wales) WAL	Rhys Taylor	20	0	20+0	0	0+0	0	0+0	0	0+0	0
10	FW	(England) ENG	Brett Williams	13	2	4+7	2	1+1	0	0+0	0	0+0	0
10	FW	(England) ENG	Shaun Harrad	8	3	6+2	3	0+0	0	0+0	0	0+0	0
10	FW	(England) ENG	Sam Hoskins	8	2	2+6	2	0+0	0	0+0	0	0+0	0
19	DF	(England) ENG	Guy Branston	4	0	2+0	0	2+0	0	0+0	0	0+0	0
25	DF	(England) ENG	Jon Harley	12	0	11+1	0	0+0	0	0+0	0	0+0	0
25	DF	(England) ENG	Scott Griffiths	8	0	8+0	0	0+0	0	0+0	0	0+0	0
26	MF	(England) ENG	Sam Wood	27	1	24+2	1	1+0	0	0+0	0	0+0	0
27	DF	(England) ENG	Richard Naylor	5	0	5+0	0	0+0	0	0+0	0	0+0	0
28	MF	(England) ENG	Kieron Cadogan	13	1	7+6	1	0+0	0	0+0	0	0+0	0

=== Top scorers ===
Place	Position	Nation	Number	Name	League Two	FA Cup	League Cup	FL Trophy	Total
1	FW	(England)	23	Lewis Grabban	17	3	0	0	20
2	FW	(England)	9	Alex Revell	10	0	0	1	11
3	MF	(England)	7	Gareth Evans	7	0	0	0	7
4	FW	(England)	10	Adam Le Fondre	4	0	0	0	4
=	MF	(Wales)	18	Ben Pringle	4	0	0	0	4
=	DF	(England)	5	Ryan Cresswell	4	0	0	0	4
7	FW	(England)	10	Shaun Harrad	3	0	0	0	3
8	DF	(England)	17	Johnny Mullins	2	0	0	0	2
=	FW	(England)	9	Brett Williams	2	0	0	0	2
=	MF	(England)	4	Danny Harrison	2	0	0	0	2
=	MF	(England)	8	Jason Taylor	2	0	0	0	2
=	FW	(England)	10	Sam Hoskins	2	0	0	0	2
13	DF	(Wales)	22	Troy Brown	1	0	0	0	1
=	MF	(England)	11	Danny Schofield	1	0	0	0	1
=	MF	(England)	12	Marcus Marshall	1	0	0	0	1
=	MF	(England)	26	Sam Wood	1	0	0	0	1
=	MF	(Wales)	15	Mark Bradley	1	0	0	0	1
=	MF	(England)	28	Kieron Cadogan	1	0	0	0	1
				TOTALS	67	3	0	1	71

=== Disciplinary record ===
Number	Nation	Position	Name	League Two		FA Cup		League Cup		FL Trophy		Total	
Number	Nation	Position	Name	Yellow card	Red card	Yellow card	Red card	Yellow card	Red card	Yellow card	Red card	Yellow card	Red card
11	(England)	MF	Danny Schofield	8	1	0	0	0	0	0	0	8	1
5	(England)	DF	Ryan Cresswell	6	1	0	0	0	0	0	0	6	1
24	(England)	DF	Ryan Cresswell	5	1	0	0	0	0	0	0	5	1
12	(England)	MF	Marcus Marshall	1	0	2	1	1	0	0	0	4	1
4	(England)	MF	Danny Harrison	3	0	1	0	0	0	0	0	4	0
23	(England)	FW	Lewis Grabban	4	0	0	0	0	0	0	0	4	0
3	(England)	DF	Tom Newey	3	1	0	0	0	0	0	0	3	1
2	(England)	DF	Dale Tonge	2	1	1	0	0	0	0	0	3	1
19	(England)	DF	Guy Branston	0	0	2	0	0	0	0	0	2	0
8	(England)	DF	Johnny Mullins	2	0	0	0	0	0	0	0	2	0
9	(England)	FW	Alex Revell	2	0	0	0	0	0	0	0	2	0
15	(Wales)	MF	Mark Bradley	2	0	0	0	0	0	0	0	2	0
8	(England)	MF	Jason Taylor	2	0	0	0	0	0	0	0	2	0
21	(England)	GK	Andy Warrington	1	0	0	0	0	0	0	0	1	0
1	(Republic of Ireland)	GK	Conrad Logan	1	0	0	0	0	0	0	0	1	0
6	(England)	DF	Luke Foster	1	0	0	0	0	0	0	0	1	0
7	(England)	MF	Gareth Evans	1	0	0	0	0	0	0	0	1	0
27	(England)	DF	Richard Naylor	1	0	0	0	0	0	0	0	1	0
18	(England)	MF	Ben Pringle	1	0	0	0	0	0	0	0	1	0
26	(England)	MF	Sam Wood	1	0	0	0	0	0	0	0	1	0
10	(England)	FW	Sam Hoskins	1	0	0	0	0	0	0	0	1	0
			TOTALS	6	1	0	0	1	0	0	0	7	1

== Results ==
=== Pre-season friendlies ===
16 July 2011	Grimsby Town	1–3	Rotherham United	Blundell Park
15:00	Duffy 81'		Cresswell 20'; Grabban 44'; Holroyd 80'	Attendance: 2,135

19 July 2011	Rotherham United	1–2	Sheffield Wednesday	Don Valley Stadium
19:45	Le Fondre 83'		Buxton 50'; Madine 65'	Attendance: 5,589

26 July 2011	Stocksbridge Park Steels	3–0	Rotherham United	Look Local Stadium
19:45	Riordan 29'; Bradley 32' (o.g.); Telling 37'

27 July 2011	Rotherham United	0–2	Scunthorpe United	Don Valley Stadium
19:45			Ryan 9'; Grant 19' (pen.)	Attendance: 702

30 July 2011	Rotherham United	1–3	Huddersfield Town	Don Valley Stadium
15:00	Holroyd 54'		McDermott 63'; Novak 72'; Rhodes 82'	Attendance: 1,012

=== League Two ===
6 August 2011 1	Rotherham United	1–0	Oxford United	Don Valley Stadium
15:00	Grabban 48'			Attendance: 4,484

13 August 2011 2	Plymouth Argyle	1–4	Rotherham United	Home Park
15:00	Atkinson 49'		Evans 52', 59'; Le Fondre 82', 87'	Attendance: 6,015

16 August 2011 3	Crewe Alexandra	1–2	Rotherham United	Alexandra Stadium
19:45	Moore 74'		Le Fondre 15'; Pringle 72'	Attendance: 3,458

20 August 2011 4	Rotherham United	2–2	Barnet	Don Valley Stadium
15:00	Brown 49'; Le Fondre 82'		Kamdjo 36'; McLeod 63' (pen.)	Attendance: 3,546

27 August 2011 5	Rotherham United	3–0	Gillingham	Don Valley Stadium
15:00	Harrison 53'; Grabban 63'; Evans 78'			Attendance: 3,740

3 September 2011 6	Swindon Town	3–2	Rotherham United	County Ground
12:15	Ritchie 39'; Connell 69', 81'		Revell 21', 65'	Attendance: 6,304

10 September 2011 7	Rotherham United	3–1	Dagenham & Redbridge	Don Valley Stadium
15:00	Evans 8'; Grabban 29', 38'		Doe 21'	Attendance: 3,286

13 September 2011 8	Accrington Stanley	1–1	Rotherham United	Crown Ground
19:45	Hessey 83'		Cresswell 38'	Attendance: 1,486

17 September 2011 9	Torquay United	3–3	Rotherham United	Plainmoor
15:00	Bodin 11'; Nicholson 42'; Howe 47'		Grabban 3', 34'; Cresswell 9'	Attendance: 2,330

24 September 2011 10	Rotherham United	0–4	Southend United	Don Valley Stadium
15:00			Gilbert 10'; Timlin 47', 60'; Harris 64'	Attendance: 3,433

1 October 2011 11	Port Vale	2–0	Rotherham United	Vale Park
15:00	Richards 18', 26'			Attendance: 4,983

8 October 2011 12	Rotherham United	0–1	Burton Albion	Don Valley Stadium
15:00			Richards 8'	Attendance: 3,645

14 October 2011 13	Bristol Rovers	5–2	Rotherham United	Memorial Stadium (Bristol)
19:45	McGleish 10', 29' (pen.); Bolger 32'; Lee Brown 58'; Anyinsah 88'		Taylor 37'; Schofield 53'	Attendance: 5,395

22 October 2011 14	Rotherham United	1–1	Shrewsbury Town	Don Valley Stadium
15:00	Grabban 22'		Cansdell-Sherriff 45'	Attendance: 3,561

25 October 2011 15	Morecambe	3–3	Rotherham United	Globe Arena
19:45	McDonald 3'; Wilson 28' (pen.) 37' (pen.)		Grabban 39' (pen.); Evans 58'; Revell 64'	Attendance: 3,012

29 October 2011 16	Northampton Town	1–1	Rotherham United	Sixfields Stadium
15:00	Logan 24' (o.g.)		Evans 2'	Attendance: 4,182

5 November 2011 17	Rotherham United	2–0	Aldershot Town	Don Valley Stadium
15:00	Grabban 14'; Holroyd 41'			Attendance: 3,284

19 November 2011 18	Bradford City	2–3	Rotherham United	Valley Parade
15:00	Mitchell 34'; Flynn 90+2' (pen.)		Grabban 22' (pen.); Revell 51'; Marshall 57'	Attendance: 10,551

26 November 2011 19	Rotherham United	1–2	Crawley Town	Don Valley Stadium
15:00	Williams 20'		Barnett 48'; Simpson 68'	Attendance: 3,962

10 December 2011 20	Hereford United	2–3	Rotherham United	Edgar Street
15:00	Arquin 34'; Facey 42'		Mullins 13', 65'; Revell 23'	Attendance: 1,908

17 December 2011 21	Rotherham United	1–0	AFC Wimbledon	Don Valley Stadium
15:00	Wood 78'			Attendance: 3,343

26 December 2011 22	Macclesfield	0–0	Rotherham United	Moss Rose
15:00				Attendance: 3,132

30 December 2011 23	Cheltenham	1–0	Rotherham United	Whaddon Road
15:00	Pack 11'			Attendance: 3,582

2 January 2012 24	Rotherham United	3–0	Bradford City	Don Valley Stadium
15:00	Grabben 63', 68' (pen.); Williams 74'			Attendance: 5,368

14 January 2012 25	Rotherham United	1–2	Swindon Town	Don Valley Stadium
15:00	Revell 54'		Ritchie 19', 20'	Attendance: 4,236

21 January 2012 26	Rotherham United	0–1	Port Vale	Don Valley Stadium
15:00			Marc Richards 57'(pen.)	Attendance: 3,189

28 January 2012 27	Dag & Red	3–2	Rotherham United	Victoria Road
15:00	Nurse 50'; Bradley 62'(OG); Doe 78'		Harrison 28'; Revell 63'	Attendance: 3,189

10 February 2012 28	Southend	0–2	Rotherham United	Roots Hall
20:00			Hoskins 9'; Naylor (yellow card) 45'; Taylor (yellow card) 48'; Revell 83'	Attendance: 4,717

14 February 2012 29	Rotherham United	1–0	Accrington Stanley	Don Valley Stadium
19:45	Harrad 28' (pen.)		Nsiala (yellow card) 68'	Attendance: 2,572

18 February 2012 30	Burton Albion	1–1	Rotherham United	Pirelli Stadium
15:00	Zola 40'; Dyer (yellow card) 42'		Harrad 55'; Harrison (yellow card) 72'; Revell (yellow card) 84'	Attendance: 3,313

21 February 2012 31	Gillingham	0–0	Rotherham United	Priestfield Stadium
19:45			Mullins (yellow card) 33'; Grabban (yellow card) 37'	Attendance: 3,248

25 February 2012 32	Rotherham United	0–1	Bristol Rovers	Don Valley Stadium
15:00			Dorman 90+2'	Attendance: 3,937

3 March 2012 33	Barnet	1–1	Rotherham United	Underhill Stadium
15:00	Byrne 7'; Holmes (yellow card) 32'; Kamdjo (yellow card) 35'; Hughes (yellow card) 57'; Downing (yellow card) 59' (yellow-red card) 65'		Bradley (yellow card) 6'; Pringle 50'; Mullins (yellow card) 74'	Attendance: 1,765

6 March 2012 34	Rotherham United	1–1	Crewe Alexandra	Don Valley Stadium
15:00	Grabban 62'; Wood (yellow card) 72'; Pringle (yellow card) 82'		Davis 16' (pen.)	Attendance: 2,447

10 March 2012 35	Rotherham United	1–0	Plymouth Argyle	Don Valley Stadium
15:00	Grabban 70' (pen.); Taylor (yellow card) 90+4'			Attendance: 3,475

13 March 2012 36	Rotherham United	0–1	Torquay United	Don Valley Stadium
19:45			Mansell 26'	Attendance: 2,538

17 March 2012 37	Oxford United	2–1	Rotherham United	Kassam Stadium
15:00	Rendell 45+2' (yellow card) 88'; Hall 52'; Whing (yellow card) 90+3'		Bradley (yellow card) 23'; Revell (yellow card) 77'; Grabban 83' (pen.)	Attendance: 6,756

20 March 2012 38	Rotherham United	4–2	Macclesfield Town	Don Valley Stadium
19:45	Bradley 37'; Pringle 57'; Revell 68'; Cadogan 77'		Smith 65'; Chalmers 73' (pen.)	Attendance: 2,505

24 March 2012 39	Crawley Town	3–0	Rotherham United	Broadfield Stadium
15:00	Clarke 43'; Alexander 53' (pen.); Mills 67'		Hoskins (yellow card) 68'	Attendance: 2,766

31 March 2012 40	Rotherham United	1–0	Hereford United	Don Valley Stadium
15:00	Grabban 43'; Schofield (yellow card) 83'			Attendance: 3,237

6 April 2012 41	AFC Wimbledon	1–2	Rotherham United	Kingsmeadow
15:00	Moore 65'		Cresswell (yellow card) 12'; Pringle 34'; Hoskins 83'	Attendance: 4,387

9 April 2012 42	Rotherham United	1–0	Cheltenham Town	Don Valley Stadium
15:00	Cresswell 90+3'			Attendance: 3,066

14 April 2012 43	Shrewsbury Town	3–1	Rotherham United	Greenhous Meadow
15:00	Wroe (yellow card) 19'; Gornell 45+2', 67'; Wildig 48'; Cansdell-Sherriff (yellow card) 88'		Cresswell 2' (yellow card) 44'; Taylor (yellow card) 19'; Grabban (yellow card) 30'	Attendance: 5,873

21 April 2012 44	Rotherham United	3–2	Morecambe	Don Valley Stadium
15:00	Grabban 21', 90+1'; Cresswell (yellow card) 45' (yellow-red card) 74'; Taylor 48'		Burrow 39'; Redshaw 75' (pen.)	Attendance: 2,876

28 April 2012 45	Aldershot Town	2–2	Rotherham United	Recreation Ground (Aldershot)
15:00	Vincenti 20' (yellow card) 76'; Payne (yellow card) 48'; Madjo 56'; Roberts (yellow card) 74' (yellow-red card) 85'		Evans 11' (pen.); Hoskins 30'; Newey (yellow card) 45+1' (yellow-red card) 82'; Schofield (yellow card) 78'	Attendance: 2,578

5 May 2012 46	Rotherham United	1–1	Northampton Town	Don Valley Stadium
15:00	Revell 31'		Carlisle (yellow card) 81'; Akinfenwa 90+4'	Attendance: 4,729

=== FA Cup ===
12 November 2011 First Round Proper	Barrow	1–2	Rotherham United	Holker Street, Barrow
15:00	Rutherford 16'	Report	Grabban 82', 87' (pen.)	Attendance: 3,030

3 December 2011 Second Round Proper	Shrewsbury Town	2–1	Rotherham United	New Meadow, Shrewsbury
15:00	Sharps 48'; Wroe 83' (pen.)	Report	Grabban 42' (pen.); Marshall (yellow card) 45' (red card)	Attendance: 4,048

=== League Cup ===
9 August 2011 Round 1	Rotherham United	1–4	Leicester City	Don Valley Stadium
19:45	Mills 13' (o.g.)		Gallagher 36'; Schlupp 53', 63', 71'	Attendance: 3,717

=== Football League Trophy ===
4 October 2011 Round 2	Rotherham United	1–2	Sheffield United	Don Valley Stadium
15:00	Revell 69'		Porter 9'; Evans 90+7'	Attendance: 6,737

== Managerial change ==
Outgoing manager	Manner of departure	Date of vacancy	Position in table	Incoming manager	Date of appointment
(England) Andy Scott	Sacked	19 March 2012	11th	Steve Evans	9 April 2012

Following Rotherham's defeat to Oxford United on 17 March 2012, the club found themselves eight points from the play-off places in League Two. This prompted chairman Tony Stewart to sack Andy Scott two days later. Steve Evans was appointed as the new manager on a 3-year deal on 9 April.

== Transfers ==
Players transferred in
Date	Pos.	Name	From	Fee	Ref.
3 June 2011	FW	(England) Gareth Evans	(England) Bradford City	Free	
3 June 2011	MF	(England) Ben Pringle	(England) Derby County	Free	
1 July 2011	DF	(Wales) Troy Brown	(England) Ipswich Town	Free	
4 July 2011	FW	(England) Lewis Grabban	(England) Brentford	Free	
5 August 2011	DF	(England) Michael Raynes	(England) Scunthorpe United	Undisclosed	
31 August 2011	FW	(England) Alex Revell	(England) Leyton Orient	Undisclosed	
13 January 2012	DF	(England) Richard Naylor	(England) Doncaster Rovers	Free	
Players loaned in
Date from	Pos.	Name	From	Date to	Ref.
12 July 2011	GK	(Republic of Ireland) Conrad Logan	(England) Leicester City	January 2012	
28 August 2011	FW	(England) Brett Williams	(England) Reading	January 2012	
14 October 2011	DF	(England) Guy Branston	(England) Bradford City	14 January 2012	
14 October 2011	DF	(England) Jon Harley	(England) Notts County	14 January 2012	
24 November 2011	MF	(England) Sam Wood	(England) Brentford	3 May 2012	
2 January 2012	GK	(Wales) Rhys Taylor	(England) Chelsea	End of season	
10 January 2012	DF	(England) Scott Griffiths	(England) Peterborough United	End of season	
26 January 2012	MF	(England) Kieron Cadogan	(England) Crystal Palace	3 May 2012	
8 February 2012	FW	(England) Shaun Harrad	(England) Bury	8 March 2012	
15 March 2012	FW	(England) Sam Hoskins	(England) Southampton	End of season	
Players loaned out
Date from	Pos.	Name	To	Date to	Ref.
24 November 2011	MF	(England) Ollie Banks	(England) Buxton	9 January 2012	
6 January 2012	DF	(Wales) Troy Brown	(England) Aldershot Town	End of Season	
13 January 2012	MF	(England) Ollie Banks	(England) Stalybridge Celtic	End of season	
27 January 2012	MF	(England) Marcus Marshall	(England) Macclesfield Town	30 April 2012	
24 February 2012	GK	(England) Jamie Annerson	(England) Bradford City	End of season	
Players transferred out
Date	Pos.	Name	To	Fee	Ref.
20 June 2011	FW	(England) Ryan Taylor	(England) Bristol City	Tribunal	
27 August 2011	FW	(England) Adam Le Fondre	(England) Reading	£500,000	
20 January 2012	FW	(England) Chris Holroyd	(England) Preston North End	Undisclosed	
Players released
Date	Pos.	Name	Subsequent club	Join date	Ref.
1 June 2011	MF	(England) Kevin Ellison	(England) Morecambe	1 July 2011	
22 June 2011	FW	(England) Ian Thomas-Moore	Retired		
1 July 2011	MF	(England) Nicky Law	(Scotland) Motherwell	1 July 2011 (Bosman)	
1 July 2011	DF	(England) Nick Fenton	(England) Morecambe	1 August 2011	
1 July 2011	MF	(England) Grant Darley	(England) Stalybridge Celtic	11 August 2011	
1 July 2011	MF	(England) Stephen Brogan	(England) Alfreton Town	11 August 2011	
1 July 2011	DF	(England) Jamie Green	(England) Grimsby Town	1 September 2011	
1 July 2011	DF	(England) Luke Ashworth	(England) Harrogate Town	9 September 2011	
2 August 2011	FW	(England) Tom Pope	(England) Port Vale	Free	

== Awards ==
End of Season Awards	Winner
Player of the Season	Jonny Mullins
Community Player of the Season	Andy Warrington
Goal of the Season	Lewis Grabban vs Shrewsbury Town
