= 2010–11 Rotherham United F.C. season =

Rotherham United
2010–11 season
- Chairman: Tony Stewart
- Manager: Ronnie Moore (sacked 22 March); Andy Liddell (caretaker to 13 April); Andy Scott
- Football League Two: 9th
- FA Cup: First round (eliminated by York City)
- League Cup: First round (eliminated by Peterborough United)
- Johnstone's Paint Trophy: Northern Section; Quarter Final (eliminated by Huddersfield Town)
- Top goalscorer: League: Adam Le Fondre (24); All: Adam Le Fondre (25)
- Highest home attendance: 5,365 vs Chesterfield
- Lowest home attendance: 1,677 vs Lincoln City
- Average home league attendance: 3,667
Home colours	Away colours

This page shows the progress of Rotherham United F.C. in the 2010–11 football season, where they play in League Two in the English league system.

== Squad ==
Note: Flags indicate national team as defined under FIFA eligibility rules; some limited exceptions apply. Players may hold more than one non-FIFA nationality.

No.	Pos.	Nation	Player
1	GK	ENG	Andy Warrington
2	DF	ENG	Dale Tonge
3	DF	ENG	Tom Newey
4	MF	ENG	Danny Harrison
5	DF	ENG	Ryan Cresswell
6	DF	ENG	Nick Fenton
7	MF	ENG	Nicky Law
8	MF	ENG	Jason Taylor
9	FW	ENG	Tom Pope
10	FW	ENG	Adam Le Fondre
11	DF	ENG	Stephen Brogan
12	DF	ENG	Jamie Green
14	DF	ENG	Luke Ashworth
15	MF	ENG	Kevin Ellison

No.	Pos.	Nation	Player
16	MF	ENG	Paul Warne
17	DF	ENG	Johnny Mullins
18	MF	WAL	Mark Bradley
19	FW	ENG	Tom Elliott (on loan from Leeds United)
20	FW	ENG	Ryan Taylor
21	MF	ENG	Marcus Marshall
24	DF	ENG	Danny Coid (on loan from Blackpool)
25	MF	ENG	Mark Randall (on loan from Arsenal)
28	MF	ENG	Oliver Banks
29	MF	ENG	Grant Darley
30	GK	ENG	Jamie Annerson
31	GK	ENG	Danny Hancock
—	DF	ENG	Paul Downing (on loan from West Brom)
—	MF	ENG	Will Atkinson (on loan from Hull City)

== League Two ==
=== League table ===
Pos	Team	Pld	W	D	L	GF	GA	GD	Pts	Promotion, qualification or relegation
7	Torquay United	46	17	18	11	74	53	+21	68 (Note: Torquay United deducted one point and Hereford United deducted three points)	Qualification to League Two play-offs
8	Gillingham	46	17	17	12	67	57	+10	68	
9	Rotherham United	46	17	15	14	75	60	+15	66	
10	Crewe Alexandra	46	18	11	17	87	65	+22	65	
11	Port Vale	46	17	14	15	54	49	+5	65	

Updated to match(es) played on 28 May 2011. Source: The Football League
Rules for classification: 1) points; 2) goal difference; 3) number of goals scored.

=== Result summary ===
Overall								Home						Away					
Pld	W	D	L	GF	GA	GD	Pts	W	D	L	GF	GA	GD	W	D	L	GF	GA	GD
46	17	15	14	75	60	+15	66	10	8	5	41	26	+15	7	7	9	34	34	0

Last updated: 31 July 2011.
Source: [Rotherham United F.C.]

=== Result round by round ===
Round	1	2	3	4	5	6	7	8	9	10	11	12	13	14	15	16	17	18	19	20	21	22	23	24	25	26	27	28	29	30	31	32	33	34	35	36	37	38	39	40	41	42	43	44	45	46
Ground	H	A	H	A	A	H	A	H	H	A	H	A	H	A	H	H	A	H	H	H	A	A	H	A	A	H	A	H	A	A	H	A	A	H	A	H	A	A	H	H	A	H	A	H	A	H
Result	W	D	W	W	L	D	W	W	D	D	D	W	L	L	D	W	W	D	W	W	W	D	L	L	L	W	L	W	L	L	W	W	D	D	L	D	L	W	L	L	D	D	D	L	D	W
Position			3	3	5	5	5	3	3	3	3	3	4	5	6	6	4	5	4	2	2	2	3	3	4	3	5	3	4	4	3	3	4	4	5	4	5	5	9	10	10	10	9	9	10	9

Updated to match(es) played on 31 July 2011. Source: Results
A = Away; H = Home; W = Win; D = Draw; L = Loss

=== Results ===
7 August 2010	Rotherham United	2–1	Lincoln City	Don Valley Stadium
15:00	Le Fondre 9'; Cresswell 88'		Carayol 52'	Attendance: 3,772

14 August 2010	Morecambe	0–0	Rotherham United	Globe Arena
15:00				Attendance: 3,258

21 August 2010	Rotherham United	6–4	Cheltenham Town	Don Valley Stadium
15:00	Le Fondre 16', 48', 50', 66'; Harrison 41'; Cresswell 55'		Goulding 4'; Thomas 28'; Jeffers 36'; Lowe 90'	Attendance: 3,072

28 August 2010	Hereford United	0–1	Rotherham United	Edgar Street
15:00			Warne 45'	Attendance: 2,166

4 September 2010	Shrewsbury Town	1–0	Rotherham United	Greenhous Meadow
15:00	Ainsworth 5'			Attendance: 6,206

11 September 2010	Rotherham United	3–3	Burton Albion	Don Valley Stadium
15:00	Ellison 1'; Cresswell 34'; Le Fondre 38'		Harrad 46', 62' (pen.), 83'	Attendance: 3,516

18 September 2010	Barnet	1–4	Rotherham United	Underhill Stadium
15:00	Byrne 81'		Ellison 69'; Pope 72'; Harrison 76'; Le Fondre 89'	Attendance: 1,731

25 September 2010	Rotherham United	1–0	Chesterfield	Don Valley Stadium
15:00	Le Fondre 53'			Attendance: 5,365

28 September 2010	Rotherham United	0–0	Bradford City	Don Valley Stadium
19:45				Attendance: 3,872

2 October 2010	Bury	1–1	Rotherham United	Gigg Lane
15:00	Lowe 41'		Le Fondre 47'	Attendance: 3,788

9 October 2010	Rotherham United	1–1	Stevenage	Don Valley Stadium
15:00	Law 45'		Mousinho 82'	Attendance: 4,037

16 October 2010	Accrington Stanley	2–3	Rotherham United	Crown Ground
15:00	Parkinson 9'; Ryan 49'; Long (red card) 17'		Le Fondre 18' (pen.); Geohaghon 81'; Cresswell 90'	Attendance: 2,256

23 October 2010	Rotherham United	3–4	Wycombe Wanderers	Don Valley Stadium
15:00	Le Fondre 23', 69' (pen.); Taylor 39'		Betsy 9'; Bloomfield 18'; Strevens 45'; Rendall 84' (pen.)	Attendance: 3,651

30 October 2010	Southend United	1–0	Rotherham United	Roots Hall
15:00	Sturrock 5'			Attendance: 5,533

2 November 2010	Rotherham United	1–1	Macclesfield Town	Don Valley Stadium
19:45	Le Fondre 85'		Barnett 84'	Attendance: 2,548

13 November 2010	Rotherham United	2–1	Oxford United	Don Valley Stadium
15:00	Le Fondre 25', 37'		Clist 45'	Attendance: 3,891

20 November 2010	Crewe Alexandra	0–1	Rotherham United	Alexandra Stadium
15:00			Dugdale 2' (o.g.)	Attendance: 4,301

23 November 2010	Rotherham United	2–2	Northampton Town	Don Valley Stadium
19:45	Taylor 4'; Marshall 19'		Osman 23'; Holt 24'	Attendance: 2,490

11 December 2010	Rotherham United	1–0	Aldershot Town	Don Valley Stadium
15:00	Le Fondre 40'			Attendance: 2,754

1 January 2011	Rotherham United	5–0	Port Vale	Don Valley Stadium
15:00	Law 10'; R. Taylor 18', 68'; Atkinson 46'; Randall 85'		Tomlinson (red card) 32'	Attendance: 3,994

3 January 2011	Macclesfield Town	0–2	Rotherham United	Moss Rose
15:00			J. Taylor 29'; Fenton 84'	Attendance: 2,316

11 January 2011	Stockport County	3–3	Rotherham United	Edgeley Park
19:45	Demontagnac 33'; Husband 50', 68'		Ellison 34'; Grieve 85' (o.g.); R. Taylor 90'	Attendance: 3,612

15 January 2011	Rotherham United	1–2	Southend United	Don Valley Stadium
15:00	Fenton 61'		Hall 1'; Sturrock 13'	Attendance: 4,310

22 January 2011	Wycombe Wanderers	1–0	Rotherham United	Adams Park
15:00	Ainsworth 28'		J. Taylor (red card) 90'	Attendance: 4,181

25 January 2011	Stevenage	3–0	Rotherham United	Broadhall Way
19:45	Winn 44'; Harrison 85'; Laird 90'			Attendance: 1,549

29 January 2011	Rotherham United	4–0	Stockport County	Don Valley Stadium
15:00	Brown 12' (o.g.); R. Taylor 21', 57'; Le Fondre 34'			Attendance: 4,876

1 February 2011	Port Vale	1–0	Rotherham United	Vale Park
19:45	O'Shea 53'			Attendance: 4,515

5 February 2011	Rotherham United	3–1	Crewe Alexandra	Don Valley Stadium
15:00	Fenton 43'; Le Fondre 84'; R. Taylor 89'		Leitch-Smith 62'	Attendance: 3,750

8 February 2011	Gillingham	3–1	Rotherham United	Priestfield Stadium
19:45	McDonald 5', 36'; Oli 89'		Law 7'	Attendance: 4,824

12 February 2011	Oxford United	2–1	Rotherham United	Kassam Stadium
15:00	Heslop 18'; MacLean 63' (pen.)		Law 36'; Kennedy (red card) 64'	Attendance: 6,615

15 February 2011	Rotherham United	2–0	Accrington Stanley	Don Valley Stadium
19:45	Daley 58'; Le Fondre 90'			Attendance: 2,529

26 February 2011	Burton Albion	2–4	Rotherham United	Pirelli Stadium
15:00	Pearson 2'; Webster 34'		Mullins 6'; Marshall 75'; Le Fondre 89'; J. Taylor 90'	Attendance: 3,596

1 March 2011	Torquay United	1–1	Rotherham United	Plainmoor
19:45	O'Kane 17'		R. Taylor 73'	Attendance: 1,514

5 March 2011	Rotherham United	0–0	Barnet	Don Valley Stadium
15:00	Newey (red card) 71'			Attendance: 3,566

8 March 2011	Bradford City	2–1	Rotherham United	Coral Windows Stadium
19:45	Hunt 16'; Adeyemi 90'		Marshall 38'	Attendance: 10,910

12 March 2011	Rotherham United	0–0	Bury	Don Valley Stadium
15:00				Attendance: 4,620

18 March 2011	Chesterfield	5–0	Rotherham United	B2net Stadium
19:45	Holden 21'; Davies 31'; Lester 45', 81', 83'			Attendance: 10,089

25 March 2011	Lincoln City	0–6	Rotherham United	Sincil Bank
19:45	Kanyuka (red card) 62'		Thomas-Moore 9', 50', 63', pen.' Harrison 14'; R. Taylor 53'; J. Taylor 87'	Attendance: 3,766

29 March 2011	Rotherham United	1–3	Shrewsbury Town	Don Valley Stadium
19:45	Le Fondre 70'		Collins 20', 48'; Wroe 43' (pen.)	Attendance: 3,471

2 April 2011	Rotherham United	0–1	Morecambe	Don Valley Stadium
15:00			Spencer 82'	Attendance: 3,661

9 April 2011	Cheltenham Town	1–1	Rotherham United	Abbey Business Stadium
15:00	Gallinagh 62'		J. Taylor 11'	Attendance: 2,413

16 April 2011	Rotherham United	0–0	Hereford United	Don Valley Stadium
15:00				Attendance: 3,770

22 April 2011	Northampton Town	2–2	Rotherham United	Sixfields Stadium
19:45	McKenzie 68'; Davis 90'		Law 5'; R. Taylor 45'	Attendance: 5,167

25 April 2011	Rotherham United	0–1	Gillingham	Don Valley Stadium
15:00			Barcham 79'	Attendance: 3,445

22 April 2011	Aldershot Town	2–2	Rotherham United	Sixfields Stadium
15:00	Charles 5'; Vincenti 11'		Le Fondre 32', 55'	Attendance: 2,107

7 May 2011	Rotherham United	3–1	Torquay United	Don Valley Stadium
15:00	R. Taylor 10'; Harrison 30'; Bank 80'		Zebroski 31'	Attendance: 3,379

== FA Cup ==
6 November 2010; First Round	Rotherham United	0–0	York City	Don Valley Stadium
15:00				Attendance: 3,227

17 November 2010; First Round Replay	York City	3–0	Rotherham United	Bootham Crescent
19:45	Smith 66'; Rankine 71' (pen.), 79'			Attendance: 2,644

== League Cup ==
10 August 2010; First Round	Peterborough United	4–1	Rotherham United	London Road Stadium
19:45	Bennett 34'; Boyd 39'; McLean 50'; Mackail-Smith 85'		Marshall 9'	Attendance: 4,145

== Johnstone's Paint Trophy ==
31 August 2010 First Round	Rotherham United	1–0	Lincoln City	Don Valley Stadium
19:45	Le Fondre 47'			Attendance: 1,677

6 October 2010 Second Round	Burton Albion	1–2	Rotherham United	Pirelli Stadium
19:45	Walker 83'		Bradley 65'; Ellison 79' (pen.)	Attendance: 1,360

9 November 2010 Quarter Final	Rotherham United	2–5	Huddersfield Town	Don Valley Stadium
19:45	Taylor 11'; Cresswell 90'		Rhodes 1', 23'; Afobe 28', 72'; Arfield 52'	Attendance: 2,185

== Appearances and goals ==
As of 6 May 2011.
(Substitute appearances in brackets)

No.	Pos.	Name	League		FA Cup		League Cup		League Trophy		Total		Discipline	
No.	Pos.	Name	Apps	Goals	Apps	Goals	Apps	Goals	Apps	Goals	Apps	Goals	Yellow card	Red card
1	GK	(England) Andy Warrington	38	0	1	0	1	0	0	0	40	0	1	0
2	DF	(England) Dale Tonge	21 (2)	0	0	0	0	0	0	0	21 (2)	0	3	0
3	DF	(England) Tom Newey	38	0	2	0	1	0	1	0	42	0	6	1
4	MF	(England) Danny Harrison	23 (7)	4	1	0	1	0	1	0	26 (7)	4	2	0
5	DF	(England) Ryan Cresswell	21 (1)	4	1	0	1	0	2	1	25 (1)	5	3	0
6	DF	(England) Nick Fenton	31 (1)	3	2	0	0	0	2	0	35 (1)	3	5	0
7	MF	(England) Nicky Law	44	4	2	0	1	0	3	0	50	4	1	0
8	MF	(England) Jason Taylor	37 (4)	5	1	0	1	0	3	0	42 (4)	5	4	1
9	FW	(England) Tom Pope	9 (9)	1	0	0	0	0	2	0	11 (9)	1	3	0
10	FW	(England) Adam Le Fondre	40 (5)	24	2	0	1	0	1	1	44 (5)	25	6	0
11	DF	(England) Stephen Brogan	1	0	1	0	1	0	1	0	4	0	0	0
12	DF	(England) Jamie Green	5 (2)	0	0	0	0	0	2 (1)	0	7 (3)	0	0	0
14	DF	(England) Luke Ashworth	3 (6)	0	1	0	1	0	0 (2)	0	5 (8)	0	2	0
15	MF	(England) Kevin Ellison	20 (3)	3	0 (1)	0	1	0	2	1	49 (1)	4	2	0
16	FW	(England) Paul Warne	3 (8)	1	0	0	0 (1)	0	0 (3)	0	3 (12)	1	1	0
17	DF	(England) Johnny Mullins	35	1	2	0	0	0	2	0	39	1	2	0
18	MF	(Wales) Mark Bradley	14 (7)	0	1	0	0	0	1 (1)	1	16 (8)	1	2	0
19	FW	(England) Tom Elliott	4 (2)	0	1	0	0	0	1	0	5 (2)	0	1	0
20	FW	(England) Ryan Taylor	30 (4)	11	2	0	0	0	1	1	33 (4)	12	4	0
21	MF	(England) Marcus Marshall	26 (10)	3	2	0	1	1	1	0	30 (10)	4	4	0
22	DF	(England) Exodus Geohaghon	14	1	0	0	0	0	2	0	16	1	2	0
22	MF	(England) Will Atkinson	3	1	0	0	0	0	0	0	3	1	0	0
22	FW	(England) Ian Thomas-Moore	11 (1)	3	0	0	0	0	0	0	11 (1)	3	2	0
23	DF	(Northern Ireland) Dean Holden	4 (2)	3	0	0	0	0	1	0	5 (2)	3	1	0
23	DF	(England) Callum Kennedy	4 (1)	0	0	0	0	0	0	0	4 (1)	0	0	1
24	FW	(Nigeria) Jeremiah Ani	0	0	0	0	0	0	1	0	1	0	0	0
24	DF	(England) Danny Coid	9	0	0	0	0	0	0	0	9	0	0	0
25	MF	(England) Mark Randall	3 (7)	1	0	0	0	0	0	0	3 (7)	1	2	0
26	MF	(Jamaica) Omar Daley	2 (6)	1	0	0	0	0	0	0	2 (6)	1	1	0
27	FW	(England) Liam Henderson	5 (6)	0	0	0	0	0	0	0	5 (6)	0	1	0
28	MF	(England) Oliver Banks	0 (1)	1	0	0	0	0	0	0	0 (1)	1	0	0
30	GK	(England) Jamie Annerson	8 (1)	0	1	0	0	0	3	0	12 (1)	0	1	0

== Awards ==
End of Season Awards	Winner
CCH Ward Player of the Year	Adam Le Fondre
Community Player of the Year	Dale Tonge
KCM Skips Goal of the Season	Ryan Taylor (vs Port Vale, 1 January 2011)

== Transfers ==
=== In ===
Player name	Club From	Fee
(England) Marcus Marshall	Blackburn Rovers	Free Transfer
(England) Tom Newey	Bury	Free Transfer
(England) Ryan Cresswell	Bury	Undisclosed
(England) Johnny Mullins	Stockport County	Free Transfer
(England) Luke Ashworth	Leyton Orient	Free Transfer
(Wales) Mark Bradley	Walsall	Free Transfer
(Nigeria) Jeremiah Ani	RoPS	Free Transfer
(England) Ian Thomas-Moore	Tranmere Rovers	Undisclosed

=== Out ===
Player name	Club To	Fee
(Republic of Ireland) Micky Cummins	Grimsby Town	Released
(England) Pablo Mills	Crawley Town	Released
(England) Drewe Broughton	Lincoln City	Free Transfer
(England) Ian Sharps	Shrewsbury Town	Free Transfer
(England) David Haggerty	Eastwood Town	Released
(England) Gary Roberts	Port Vale	Free Transfer
(England) Mark Lynch	Stockport County	Free Transfer
(Scotland) Andy Liddell	–	Retired
(England) Marc Joseph	Altrincham	Released
(England) Andrew Nicholas	Barrow	Released
(Nigeria) Jeremiah Ani	APOP Kinyras Peyias	Released

=== Loaned In ===
Player name	Club From	Length of Loan
(England) Tom Elliott	Leeds United	6 Months
(England) Exodus Geohaghon	Peterborough United	3 Months
(Northern Ireland) Dean Holden	Shrewsbury Town	3 Months
(England) Mark Randall	Arsenal	3 Months
(England) Danny Coid	Blackpool	3 Months
(England) Paul Downing	West Bromwich Albion	1 Month
(England) Will Atkinson	Hull City	2 Months
(Jamaica) Omar Daley	Bradford City	2 Months
(England) Callum Kennedy	Swindon Town	4 Months
(England) Liam Henderson	Watford	1 Month

=== Loaned out ===
Player name	Club To	Length of Loan
(England) Stephen Brogan	Stalybridge Celtic	1 Month
(England) Tom Pope	Port Vale	3 Months
(England) Kevin Ellison	Bradford City	3 Months
