= Castle High School =

Castle High School may refer to:

United Kingdom

- Castle High School (Belfast) in Belfast, Northern Ireland
- Castle High School (Dudley) in Dudley, England

United States

- John H. Castle High School in Newburgh, Indiana
- James B. Castle High School in Kaneohe, Hawaii

== See also ==
- Castle Hill High School in Castle Hill, New South Wales, Australia
- Castle Hill High School, Offerton in Stockport, England, United Kingdom
- Mearns Castle High School in Newton Mearns, East Renfrewshire, Scotland, United Kingdom
