= Marcus Marshall (footballer) =

English footballer (born 1989)

Personal information
- Full name: Marcus Joseph Lewis Marshall
- Date of birth: 7 October 1989 (age 37)
- Place of birth: Hammersmith, England
- Height: 6 ft 1 in (1.85 m)
- Position: Winger

Team information
- Current team: Hucknall Town

Youth career
- Blackburn Rovers

Senior career*
Years	Team	Apps	(Gls)
2008–2010	Blackburn Rovers	0	(0)
2010	→ Rotherham United (loan)	22	(0)
2010–2012	Rotherham United	51	(4)
2012	→ Macclesfield Town (loan)	14	(1)
2012–2013	Bury	9	(0)
2012–2013	→ Grimsby Town (loan)	14	(2)
2013	→ Grimsby Town (loan)	11	(0)
2013–2015	Morecambe	15	(0)
2014	→ Lincoln City (loan)	32	(2)
2015–2016	Grimsby Town	16	(0)
2016–2017	Boston United	27	(0)
2017	→ Coalville Town (loan)		
2017–2018	Alfreton Town	22	(1)
2017–2018	→ Hyde United (loan)	4	(2)
2018–2020	Matlock Town	58	(20)
2020–2022	Basford United	21	(3)
2022	Matlock Town	9	(0)
2022	AFC Telford United	8	(0)
2022–2023	Mickleover	23	(1)
2022–2023	→ Basford United (loan)	3	(0)
2023–2025	Eastwood	34	(10)
2025	Radford	3	(0)
2026-	Hucknall Town	2	(0)
- * Club domestic league appearances and goals as of 21:35, 18 February 2026 (UTC)

Marcus Joseph Lewis Marshall (born 7 October 1989) is an English professional footballer who plays as a winger for Hucknall Town.

He has previously played for Blackburn Rovers where he came through the club's youth academy but only made one League Cup appearance. He also went on to play professionally for Rotherham United, Macclesfield Town, Bury, Grimsby Town, Morecambe and Lincoln City. He has since played in Non-League football with Boston United, Coalville Town, Alfreton Town, Hyde United, Matlock Town, Basford United, AFC Telford United and Mickleover.

== Career ==
=== Blackburn Rovers ===
Marshall was a youth product of Premier League side Blackburn Rovers. He was added to the club's first team squad in August 2008 ahead of the 2008–09 season. On 27 August 2008 Sam Allardyce handed him his first team debut when he came on as a 76th-minute substitute for Morten Gamst Pedersen in a 4–1 victory over Grimsby Town in the 1st Round of the League Cup. The game would be Marshall's only outing for the Blackburn first team and he spent the rest of the campaign in the reserves.

=== Rotherham United ===
On 23 January 2010, Marshall was signed on a month's emergency loan by Rotherham United. On 30 June, Marshall became a free agent when it was confirmed he would not be offered a new contract by Blackburn. He agreed to join Rotherham permanently on 1 July. Marshall scored his first career goal in Rotherham's 4–1 League Cup First Round defeat to Peterborough United. His first competitive league goal eventually came in a 2–2 draw with Northampton Town on 23 November 2010. He joined fellow League Two side Macclesfield Town on a one-month emergency loan in January 2012, scoring on his debut against Cheltenham Town, and was released by Rotherham in May 2012.

=== Bury ===
On 3 July 2012, Marshall joined League One club Bury.

==== Loan to Grimsby Town ====
In November 2012, he joined Grimsby Town on an initial one-month loan. Having impressed during his loan spell, Grimsby joint-managers Rob Scott and Paul Hurst admitted their intentions to extend Marshall's stay at Blundell Park. On 31 December 2012, Marshall extended his loan deal until the end of the 2012–13 season. On 21 January 2013, Bury recalled Marshall from his loan spell, amidst speculation of a bid from rivals Luton Town which if confirmed would make him the second Grimsby loanee to be poached by Luton during the 2013 January transfer window. Grimsby joint-manager Rob Scott said of the matter "We're fighting to keep Marcus but the offer that Luton have put in is ridiculous really. The amount of money that they've offered for him when he's out contract at the end of the season is ridiculous, but that's their business."

On 24 January 2013 it was revealed that despite Bury and Luton agreeing a fee, Marshall had rejected a move to Luton paving the way to a potential return to Grimsby. On 25 January 2013 Marshall re-signed for Grimsby on loan for the remainder of the season. On 29 January 2013, less than a week after rejecting Luton he scored the third goal against them in Grimsby's 3–0 FA Trophy quarter final victory. At the end of the season Marshall returned to Bury with Grimsby manager Paul Hurst quoting: "the club could still move for the player on a permanent deal, while also admitting that Marshall's performances had dipped towards the end of the season."

=== Morecambe ===
On 19 June 2013 Marshall signed a two-year deal with Morecambe.

==== Loan to Lincoln City ====
Having endured a difficult first season at Morecambe, Marshall was made available for transfer and was loaned out to Lincoln City for the entire 2014–15 season.

=== Return to Grimsby Town ===
On 29 June 2015, Marshall signed for Conference National side Grimsby Town on a one-year deal.

Marshall played in Grimsby's play-off campaign but was an unused substitute in the 3–1 victory over Forest Green Rovers in the 2016 National League play-off final at Wembley, seeing Grimsby promoted to League Two after a six-year absence from the Football League.

Following promotion to the Football League, Marshall was released when his contract expired at the end of the season having only made 16 league appearances throughout the season.

=== Non-League ===
Following his release from Grimsby, Marshall signed a one-year deal for National League North side Boston United. Marshall signed for Coalville Town on loan on 24 March 2017.

On 19 June 2017 Marshall signed with Alfreton Town. He joined Hyde United on a one-month loan deal in December 2017, debuting in the club's 3–1 home victory over Scarborough Athletic on 23 December 2017. He returned to Alfreton Town at the completion of the loan period.

On 13 June 2018 he joined Matlock Town.

On 27 March 2020, Marshall joined Basford United for an undisclosed fee.

On 17 January 2022, he returned to Northern Premier League Premier Division rivals Matlock Town for an undisclosed fee along with Terry Hawkridge.

On 22 March 2022, Marshall signed a short-term contract with National League North side AFC Telford United that would expire at the end of the 2021–22 season. He was released at the end of the 2021–22 season.

Marshall signed for Mickleover in May 2022 ahead of the 2022–23 season. Following a loan spells back at Basford, Marshall signed for Eastwood CFC for the 2023–24 season.

== Career statistics ==
As of match played 17 April 2023

Appearances and goals by club, season and competition
Club	Season	League			FA Cup		League Cup		Other		Total	
Club	Season	Division	Apps	Goals	Apps	Goals	Apps	Goals	Apps	Goals	Apps	Goals
Blackburn Rovers	2008–09	Premier League	0	0	0	0	1	0	—		1	0
Rotherham United (loan)	2009–10	League Two	22	0	0	0	0	0	1 (Note: Appearances in League Two play-offs)	0	23	0
Rotherham United	2010–11	League Two	36	3	2	0	1	1	1 (Note: Appearances in Football League Trophy)	0	40	4
Rotherham United	2011–12	League Two	15	1	1	0	1	0	0	0	17	1
Rotherham United	Rotherham total		73	4	3	0	2	1	2	0	80	5
Macclesfield Town (loan)	2011–12	League Two	14	1	—		—		0	0	14	1
Bury	2012–13	League One	9	0	0	0	1	0	1	0	11	0
Grimsby Town (loan)	2012–13	Conference Premier	25	2	0	0	—		10 (Note: Eight appearances two goals in FA Trophy, two appearances in Conference Premier play-offs)	2	35	4
Morecambe	2013–14	League Two	15	0	1	0	1	0	0	0	17	0
Lincoln City (loan)	2014–15	Conference Premier	32	2	2	0	—		1 (Note: Appearances in FA Trophy)	0	35	2
Grimsby Town	2015–16	National League	16	0	1	1	—		5 (Note: Four appearances in FA Trophy, one appearance in National League play-offs)	0	22	1
Boston United	2016–17	National League North	27	0	2	0	—		2 (Note: One appearance one goal in FA Trophy, one appearance in Lincolnshire Senior Cup)	1	31	1
Alfreton Town	2017–18	National League North	22	1	0	0	—		0	0	22	1
Hyde United (loan)	2017–18	Northern Premier League D1 North	4	2	0	0	—		1 (Note: Appearances in Cheshire Senior Cup)	0	5	2
Matlock Town	2018–19	Northern Premier League Premier Division	33	10	0	0	—		1 (Note: Appearances in Derbyshire Senior Cup)	1	34	11
Matlock Town	2019–20	Northern Premier League Premier Division	25	10	2	0	—		12 (Note: Six appearances four goals in FA Trophy, three appearances one goal in Derbyshire Senior Cup, three appearances in Northern Premier League Challenge Cup)	5	39	15
Matlock Town	Total		58	20	2	0	—		13	6	73	26
Basford United	2020–21	Northern Premier League Premier Division	3	2	0	0	—		4	3	7	5
Basford United	2021–22	Northern Premier League Premier Division	18	1	3	1	—		2	1	23	3
Basford United	Total		21	3	3	1	—		6	4	30	8
Matlock Town	2021–22	Northern Premier League Premier Division	9	0	0	0	—		0	0	9	0
AFC Telford United	2021–22	National League North	8	0	0	0	—		0	0	8	0
Mickleover	2022–23	Southern League Premier Division Central	23	1	1	0	—		0	0	24	1
Basford United (loan)	2022–23	Southern League Premier Division Central	3	0	0	0	—		1 (Note: Appearances in Nottinghamshire Senior Cup)	0	4	0
Career total			351	36	15	2	5	1	42	13	413	52

== Honours ==
Grimsby Town

- FA Trophy: Runners-up, 2012–13
- National League: play-off winners 2015–16
