= Offerton School =

School in Stockport, Greater Manchester, England

Location
- Curzon Rroad & The Fairway; Offerton, Stockport, Greater Manchester, SK2 5DS; England; 53°24′06″N 2°07′07″W

Information
- Type: Community school
- Established: 1955
- Closed: 2012
- Local authority: Stockport
- Specialist: Business & Enterprise
- Department for Education URN: 106132 Tables
- Ofsted: Reports
- Chair: Dr P Beatty
- Gender: Girls & Boys
- Age: 11 to 16
- Enrolment: 1500
- Former name: Goyt Bank School, Offerton High School

Offerton School was a state comprehensive secondary school located north of the A626 road near the River Goyt in Offerton, a suburb of Stockport, Greater Manchester. The school catered for pupils aged 11 to 16 and was maintained by the Metropolitan Borough of Stockport. Due to a forced closure issued by the government, the school ceased to function in 2012.

== History ==
The school was originally known as Offerton Secondary School for Girls, Curzon Road, which was the first school to be built on the 50-acre campus in 1955, built by Stockport Corporation. It had 600 Girls.

The second school to be built in 1960 was Goyt Bank Technical High School for Girls. It was a two-form entry grammar technical school, with girls moving there from the former Greek Street High School for Girls in Stockport.

The third and final school to be built on the campus in 1964 was Stockport Technical High School for Boys. Stockport Technical High School (a boys' technical school) moved from Pendlebury Hall on Lancashire Hill to The Fairway at Offerton. It had 400 boys.

It became Goyt Bank School in September 1972 when Offerton Secondary School for Girls, Goyt Bank High School for Girls and Stockport Technical High School for Boys merged on the Offerton Campus. It had 1500 Girls and Boys.

In 1983 Goyt Bank merged with Dialstone Lane, and was renamed Offerton High School. Later it became Offerton School.

Today, part of the former school site now houses Castle Hill High School, a special school that was relocated from Brinnington.

== Former pupils ==
- Adam Le Fondre, professional footballer
- Myles Kellock, keyboardist of the indie pop band Blossoms.
- Charlie Salt, bassist of the indie pop band Blossoms.
- Alex Jones, member of The NDC

== See also ==
- List of schools in Stockport
