= Lee Thompson (footballer) =

English footballer

Personal information
- Date of birth: 25 March 1982 (age 44)
- Place of birth: Sheffield, England
- Position: Midfielder

Team information
- Current team: Worksop Parramore

Youth career
- Sheffield United

Senior career*
Years	Team	Apps	(Gls)
2001–2002	Sheffield United	0	(0)
2002	→ Boston United	5	(4)
2002–2005	Boston United	90	(8)
2005–2006	Kidderminster Harriers	32	(1)
2006–2007	Worksop Town	41	(3)
2007–	Boston United	16	(0)
- Retford United
- Worksop Parramore
- * Club domestic league appearances and goals as of 05:33, 24 May 2008 (UTC)

Lee Thompson (born 25 March 1982 in Sheffield, England) is a professional association football midfielder who made almost 100 appearances in Football League Two for Boston United between 2002 and 2005.

== Career ==
Thompson, who is a former England youth international, began his career as a trainee at Sheffield United in 2001 but did not make an appearance for the club, and joined Boston United on loan in October 2002, where he made six appearances, scoring five goals, including a hat-trick in a 3–2 win at Darlington. He joined Boston on a permanent basis in November 2002 and made almost 100 appearances for Boston in Football League Two before he was released by the club in May 2005 after not being able to agree a new contract.

Thompson joined Conference National club Kidderminster Harriers in July 2005 and, after a slow start to the season, established himself in the first-team, making 34 appearances for Kidderminster in the 2005–06 season. However, he was one of seven players released at the end of a disappointing season for Kidderminster, and he joined Worksop Town, signing a one-year contract. He made 41 appearances for Worksop Town in the 2006–07 season. In July 2007, Thompson rejoined Boston United, now in the Conference North, with manager Tommy Taylor saying, "Lee is someone I've known for a while and I'll go a long way to find a better player than him." He made 16 appearances for Boston in the 2007–08 season. Lee now plays his football at Worksop Parramore.

== Personal life ==
Thompson is the father of the footballer Declan Thompson.
