= Ollie Banks =

English footballer (born 1992)

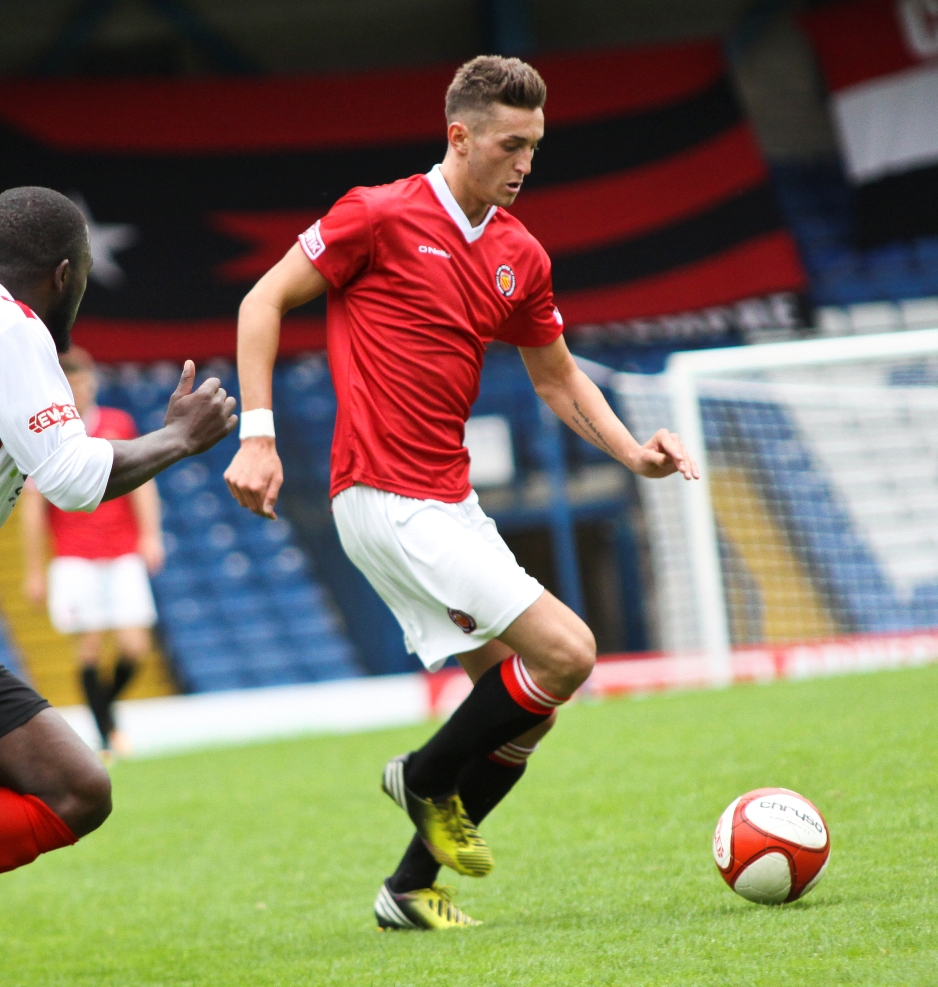
- Banks playing for FC United of Manchester

Personal information
- Full name: Oliver Ian Banks
- Date of birth: 21 September 1992 (age 34)
- Place of birth: Rotherham, England
- Height: 6 ft 3 in (1.90 m)
- Position: Midfielder

Team information
- Current team: York City
- Number: 28

Youth career
- Rotherham United

Senior career*
Years	Team	Apps	(Gls)
2011–2012	Rotherham United	1	(1)
2011	→ Sheffield (loan)		
2011	→ Buxton (loan)		
2012	→ Stalybridge Celtic (loan)	10	(0)
2012	Gainsborough Trinity		
2012	Scarborough Athletic		
2013	North Ferriby United		
2013	FC United of Manchester	18	(3)
2013–2016	Chesterfield	81	(9)
2014	→ Northampton Town (loan)	3	(0)
2016–2018	Oldham Athletic	40	(2)
2017–2018	→ Tranmere Rovers (loan)	8	(1)
2018	→ Swindon Town (loan)	17	(3)
2018–2021	Tranmere Rovers	56	(6)
2021–2022	Barrow	59	(9)
2022–2025	Chesterfield	115	(17)
2025–	York City	54	(8)
- * Club domestic league appearances and goals as of 14:32, 22 November 2026 (UTC)

Oliver Ian Banks (born 21 September 1992) is an English professional footballer who plays as a midfielder for EFL League Two club York City.

Banks formerly played for Rotherham United, Sheffield, Buxton, Stalybridge Celtic, Gainsborough Trinity, Scarborough Athletic, North Ferriby United, FC United of Manchester, Chesterfield, Northampton Town, Oldham Athletic, Tranmere Rovers, Swindon Town and Barrow.

== Early and personal life ==
Banks is the son of former professional footballer Ian Banks.

== Career ==
Banks began his career with Rotherham United, scoring on his professional debut in May 2011. While with Rotherham he spent loan spells at Sheffield, Buxton and Stalybridge Celtic. He made a total of 11 appearances for Stalybridge in all competitions.

He was released by Rotherham in May 2012. He then went on trial with York City in July 2012. Following a trial with the club, he signed for Gainsborough Trinity in August 2012. He later played for Scarborough Athletic, North Ferriby United and FC United of Manchester. He made a total of 18 appearances for FC United of Manchester in all competitions. While playing semi-professionally for FCUM he also worked part-time as a kitchen fitter.

In September 2013, Banks signed a professional contract with Chesterfield. In November 2013 he received the Football League's Young Player of the Month award. In April 2014 it was announced that Banks would be ruled out of the rest of the 2013–14 season through injury. He signed a new contract with the club in May 2014.

He moved on loan to Northampton Town in November 2014.

He signed for Oldham Athletic in July 2016. He scored his first goal for Oldham in an EFL Trophy tie against Carlisle United on 30 August 2016.

In November 2017, Banks signed for Tranmere Rovers on a one-month loan deal. He moved on loan to Swindon Town in January 2018.

At the end of the 2017–18 season, when Oldham were relegated to League Two, Banks was one of seven players released by the club.

Following his release he re-signed for Tranmere Rovers in May 2018 on a two-year contract. Banks signed a further one year deal with the club ahead of the 2020–21 season.

In January 2021 he moved to Barrow. he signed a new two-and-a-half-year contract with the club in January 2022. In June 2022, Banks had his contract terminated by mutual consent.

On 1 July 2022, Banks rejoined National League club Chesterfield on a two-year deal, six years after he had previously left the club. In the first league match of the season, he had to play for over an hour as a goalkeeper, after Lucas Covolan was sent off. He was offered a new contract at the end of the 2024–25 season.

On 30 May 2025, Banks agreed to join National League side York City from 1 July upon the expiration of his contract with Chesterfield.

== Career statistics ==
As of match played 21 November 2026

Appearances and goals by club, season and competition
Club	Season	League			FA Cup		League Cup		Other		Total	
Club	Season	Division	Apps	Goals	Apps	Goals	Apps	Goals	Apps	Goals	Apps	Goals
Rotherham United	2010–11	League Two	1	1	0	0	0	0	0	0	1	1
Rotherham United	2011–12	League Two	0	0	0	0	0	0	0	0	0	0
Rotherham United	Total		1	1	0	0	0	0	0	0	1	1
Stalybridge Celtic (loan)	2011–12	Football Conference	10	0	0	0	0	0	1	0	11	0
FC United of Manchester	2012–13	Northern Premier League	11	2	0	0	0	0	0	0	11	2
FC United of Manchester	2013–14	Northern Premier League	7	1	0	0	0	0	0	0	7	1
FC United of Manchester	Total		18	3	0	0	0	0	0	0	18	3
Chesterfield	2013–14	League Two	25	7	2	0	0	0	6	2	33	9
Chesterfield	2014–15	League One	24	0	1	0	1	0	3	1	29	1
Chesterfield	2015–16	League One	33	2	3	1	1	0	1	0	38	3
Chesterfield	Total		81	9	6	1	2	0	10	3	99	13
Northampton Town (loan)	2014–15	League Two	3	0	0	0	0	0	0	0	3	0
Oldham Athletic	2016–17	League One	33	2	2	0	2	0	5	1	42	3
Oldham Athletic	2017–18	League One	7	0	0	0	0	0	2	0	9	0
Oldham Athletic	Total		40	2	2	0	2	0	7	1	51	3
Tranmere Rovers (loan)	2017–18	National League	8	1	0	0	0	0	0	0	8	1
Swindon Town (loan)	2017–18	League Two	17	3	0	0	0	0	0	0	17	3
Tranmere Rovers	2018–19	League Two	33	3	2	0	1	0	3	1	39	4
Tranmere Rovers	2019–20	League One	11	3	0	0	1	0	0	0	12	3
Tranmere Rovers	2020–21	League Two	12	0	1	0	1	0	5	1	19	1
Tranmere Rovers	Total		56	6	3	0	3	0	8	2	70	8
Barrow	2020–21	League Two	20	0	0	0	0	0	0	0	20	0
Barrow	2021–22	League Two	39	9	4	2	2	0	1	1	46	12
Barrow	Total		59	9	4	2	2	0	1	1	66	12
Chesterfield	2022–23	National League	37	6	2	0	—		3	0	42	6
Chesterfield	2023–24	National League	39	9	4	1	—		0	0	43	10
Chesterfield	2024–25	League Two	39	2	2	0	1	0	3	0	45	2
Chesterfield	Total		115	17	8	1	1	0	6	0	130	18
York City	2025–26	National League	39	7	1	0	0	0	0	0	40	7
York City	2026–27	League Two	15	1	1	0	1	0	0	0	17	1
York City	Total		54	8	2	0	1	0	0	0	57	8
Career total			462	59	25	4	11	0	33	7	531	70

== Honours ==
Chesterfield

- Football League Two: 2013–14
- National League: 2023–24
- Football League Trophy runner-up: 2013–14

Tranmere Rovers

- EFL League Two play-offs: 2019

York City

- National League: 2025–26
