= Jason Taylor (English footballer) =

English footballer (born 1987)

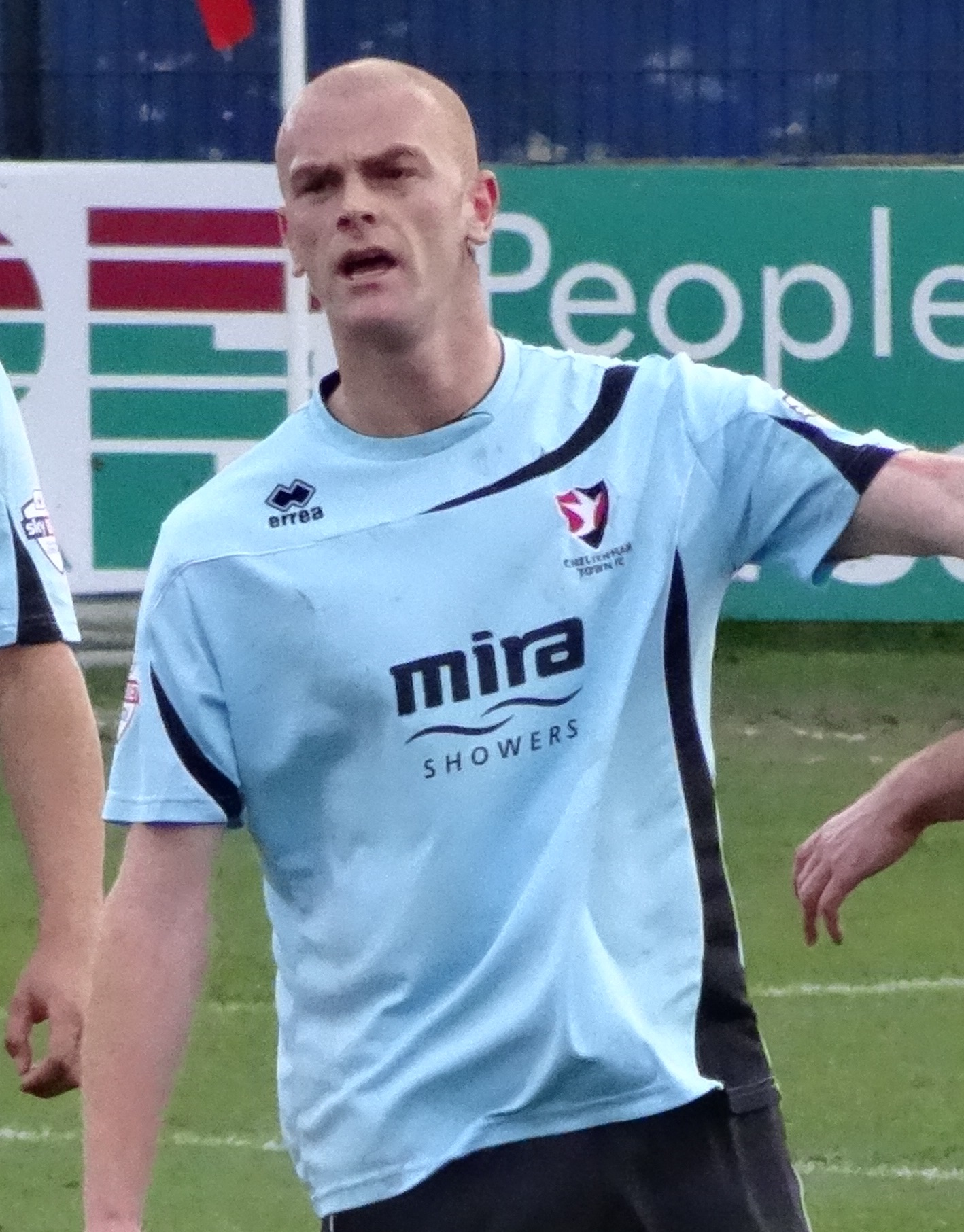
- Taylor playing for Cheltenham Town in 2014

Personal information
- Full name: Jason James Taylor
- Date of birth: 28 January 1987 (age 39)
- Place of birth: Droylsden, England
- Height: 6 ft 1 in (1.85 m)
- Position: Midfielder

Team information
- Current team: Stockport County (assistant coach)

Youth career
- –2005: Oldham Athletic

Senior career*
Years	Team	Apps	(Gls)
2005–2006	Oldham Athletic	0	(0)
2006	→ Stockport County (loan)	9	(0)
2006–2009	Stockport County	96	(6)
2009–2013	Rotherham United	118	(10)
2009–2010	→ Rochdale (loan)	23	(1)
2013–2015	Cheltenham Town	65	(2)
2015–2016	Northampton Town	51	(1)
2016–2017	Eastleigh	20	(0)
2017–2018	Fylde	17	(0)
2018–2023	Barrow	122	(1)
Total		521	(21)
- * Club domestic league appearances and goals as of 9 May 2023

Jason James Taylor (born 28 January 1987) is an English former footballer who played as a midfielder. He is currently assistant coach at Stockport County.

== Career ==
Born in Droylsden, Greater Manchester, Taylor began his career as a trainee at Oldham Athletic in October 2005. However, he made no appearances for Oldham before joining Stockport County on loan in March 2006. He signed a permanent two-year contract with Stockport County in August 2006, and then signed a new two-year in January 2007, with manager Jim Gannon saying, "He has all the attributes in terms of stamina and work-rate, plus he is mobile and we keep trying to add to his game. He has grown in confidence and he could be a fantastic player. He might out-grow us but I like to think we are bringing in players that will grow with this club. We think he's going to be an important player for us for a number of years and I'm delighted he's extended his contract." He made 51 league and cup appearances for Stockport in the 2006–2007 season, and won the club's Young Player of the Year award at the end of the season.

=== Rotherham United ===
Taylor joined Rotherham United on a free transfer in January 2009, signing a 2 1/2-year contract. He made his debut in the 1–0 win over AFC Bournemouth at Don Valley Stadium, he got his first goal in the 3–2 win over Morecambe which was also at Don Valley.

==== Rochdale (loan) ====
Taylor went on loan to Rochdale for the 2009–10 season. He scored his first goal for Rochdale on 5 December 2009 against Macclesfield.

=== Cheltenham Town ===
On 28 January, Jason Taylor has had his contract with Rotherham United terminated by mutual consent, and joined Cheltenham Town. He made his first appearance for the club in a 2–1 win over Torquay United. He was placed on the transfer list in the summer of 2014, but after a number of impressive pre-season games, rumours began spreading he would stay at the club.

=== Northampton Town ===
On 1 January, Jason Taylor joined Northampton Town on a loan deal.

=== Eastleigh ===
On 16 August 2016, Jason Taylor joined National League Eastleigh from League One Northampton Town.

=== AFC Fylde ===
In October 2017, Jason Taylor joined fellow National League side AFC Fylde from Eastleigh.

=== Barrow ===
In July 2018, Taylor moved on again, joining National League Barrow. He was the Bluebirds Player of the Year in 2018/2019, and formed part of the team that won the National League in 2020, gaining promotion to League Two.

He retired from football at the end of the 2022–23 season and was subsequently offered a coaching role at the club.

== Coaching career ==
On 1 July 2025, Taylor departed Barrow to join National League side Rochdale in the role of assistant head coach.

On 17 June 2026, Taylor followed head coach Jimmy McNulty to League One side Stockport County, returning to Edgeley Park as assistant coach having previously spent three years at the club as a player.

== Career statistics ==
As of match played 8 May 2023

Appearances and goals by club, season and competition
Club	Season	League			FA Cup		League Cup		Other		Total	
Club	Season	Division	Apps	Goals	Apps	Goals	Apps	Goals	Apps	Goals	Apps	Goals
Oldham Athletic	2005–06	League One	0	0	0	0	0	0	0	0	0	0
Stockport County (loan)	2005–06	League Two	9	0	0	0	0	0	0	0	9	0
Stockport County	2006–07	League Two	45	1	3	0	1	0	2 (Note: Appearance(s) in Football League Trophy)	0	51	1
Stockport County	2007–08	League Two	43	4	2	0	2	0	2	0	49	4
Stockport County	2008–09	League One	8	1	3	0	0	0	0	0	11	1
Stockport County	Total		96	6	8	0	3	0	4	0	111	6
Rotherham United	2008–09	League Two	15	1	—		0	0	2	0	17	1
Rotherham United	2009–10	League Two	2	0	0	0	1	0	1	0	4	0
Rotherham United	2010–11	League Two	42	5	1	0	1	0	3	0	47	5
Rotherham United	2011–12	League Two	39	2	1	0	1	0	1	0	42	2
Rotherham United	2012–13	League Two	20	2	4	0	1	0	1	0	26	2
Rotherham United	Total		118	10	6	0	4	0	8	0	136	10
Rochdale (loan)	2009–10	League Two	23	1	0	0	—		—		23	1
Cheltenham Town	2012–13	League Two	16	0	—		—		1 (Note: Appearance in League Two play-offs)	0	17	0
Cheltenham Town	2013–14	League Two	33	2	1	0	1	0	1	1	36	3
Cheltenham Town	2014–15	League Two	16	0	2	0	1	0	2	0	21	0
Cheltenham Town	Total		65	2	3	0	2	0	4	1	74	3
Northampton Town	2014–15	League Two	21	0	—		—		—		21	0
Northampton Town	2015–16	League Two	30	1	3	1	2	0	2	0	37	2
Northampton Town	Total		51	1	3	1	2	0	2	0	58	2
Eastleigh	2016–17	National League	20	0	4	0	—		0	0	24	0
AFC Fylde	2017–18	National League	17	0	2	0	—		0	0	19	0
Barrow	2018–19	National League	43	1	0	0	—		0	0	43	1
Barrow	2019–20	National League	32	0	1	0	—		1 (Note: Appearance(s) in FA Trophy)	0	34	0
Barrow	2020–21	League Two	34	0	0	0	0	0	3	1	37	1
Barrow	2021–22	League Two	12	0	2	0	1	0	3	0	18	0
Barrow	2022–23	League Two	1	0	0	0	0	0	1	0	2	0
Total			122	1	3	0	1	0	8	1	134	2
Career total			521	21	29	1	12	0	26	2	588	24

== Honours ==
Stockport County

- Football League Two play-offs: 2008

Rochdale

- Football League Two third-place promotion: 2009–10

Northampton Town

- Football League Two: 2015–16

Individual

- Barrow Player of the Season: 2018–19
