= Declan Thompson =

English footballer

Personal information
- Full name: Declan Sebastian Eratt-Thompson
- Date of birth: 9 March 2002 (age 24)
- Position: Defender

Team information
- Current team: Matlock Town

Youth career
- 2014–2016: Sheffield Wednesday
- 2016–2018: Stocksbridge Park Steels

Senior career*
Years	Team	Apps	(Gls)
2018	Stocksbridge Park Steels	2	(0)
2018–2022	Sheffield Wednesday	0	(0)
2022–2025	Ilkeston Town	88	(6)
2025–	Matlock Town		
- * Club domestic league appearances and goals as of 16:18, 26 July 2025 (UTC)

Declan Sebastian Eratt-Thompson (born 9 March 2002) is an English professional footballer who plays as a defender or midfielder for Northern Premier League Division One East club Matlock Town.

== Early and personal life ==
Thompson was diagnosed with Legg–Calvé–Perthes disease aged 5, and spent 18 months in a wheelchair. He is the son of former professional footballer Lee Thompson.

== Career ==
Thompson played youth football with Sheffield Wednesday before being released at the age of 14. He began training with the Stocksbridge Park Steels first team, where his father was assistant manager, though could not play as he was too young. He registered with the league upon his sixteenth birthday in March 2018, and made his senior debut later that month as a late substitute against Kidsgrove Athletic on 28 March 2018.

He signed for Sheffield Wednesday on a two-year scholarship in summer 2018. Following his two-year scholarship, he signed a one-year-long professional contract in summer 2020. He made his senior debut on 9 January 2021 as a late substitute in a 2–0 FA Cup win over Exeter City. A one year option was activated in his contract on 12 May 2021, keeping him at the club until the summer of 2022. On 16 March 2022, manager Darren Moore announced he would be leaving the club upon the expiry of his contract.

On 19 August 2022, Thompson signed for Southern League Premier Division Central club Ilkeston Town. He made his debut the following day off the bench in a 1–1 draw with Redditch United.

On 25 July 2025, Thompson joined Northern Premier League Division One East club Matlock Town.

== Career statistics ==
As of match played 9 January 2021

Appearances and goals by club, season and competition
Club	Season	League			FA Cup		League Cup		Other		Total	
Club	Season	Division	Apps	Goals	Apps	Goals	Apps	Goals	Apps	Goals	Apps	Goals
Sheffield Wednesday	2020–21	Championship	0	0	1	0	0	0	0	0	1	0
Sheffield Wednesday	2021–22	League One	0	0	0	0	0	0	0	0	0	0
Sheffield Wednesday	Total		0	0	1	0	0	0	0	0	1	0
Ilkeston Town	2022–23	Southern League Premier Division Central	31	2	3	0	—		2 (Note: One appearance in FA Trophy, one appearance in Derbyshire Senior Cup)	0	36	2
Ilkeston Town	2023–24	Northern Premier League Premier Division	29	2	1	0	—		0	0	30	2
Ilkeston Town	2024–25	Northern Premier League Premier Division	28	2	1	0	—		2 (Note: Appearance(s) in Derbyshire Senior Cup)	0	31	2
Ilkeston Town	Total		88	6	5	0	0	0	4	0	97	6
Career total			88	6	6	0	0	0	4	0	98	6
