= Jeremiah Ani =

Nigerian international footballer

Personal information
- Full name: Jeremiah Ani
- Date of birth: 12 February 1985 (age 41)
- Place of birth: Kaduna, Nigeria
- Height: 1.84 m (6 ft 1/2 in)
- Position: Striker

Team information
- Current team: Luqa St Andrews Fc

Youth career
- 1996–1999: Black Gold fc-kaduna

Senior career*
Years	Team	Apps	(Gls)
2004–2005	Naxxar Lions	16	(18)
2005	Valletta	8	(1)
2006	Al Ittihad Kalba	12	(9)
2007	Kerċem Ajax F.C.	16	(18)
2008	Estrela da Amadora	5	(0)
2010	Rotherham United	0	(0)
2011	APOP Kinyras FC	5	(2)
2012	Sliema Wanderers	6	(2)
2013	Pieta' Hotspurs F.C.	8	(6)
2014	Birzebbuga St. Peter's	10	(8)
2015	Gzira United	6	(11)
2015	Sliema Wanderers	Injured	
2016–2017	Marsaxlokk	6	(4)
2018–	luqa St Andrews		

International career
2000	Nigeria U17	3	(1)
2008	Nigeria U23	6	(2)
- * Club domestic league appearances and goals

Jeremiah Ani (born 12 February 1985 in Kaduna) is a Nigerian international footballer who plays as a forward for Luqa St Andrews FC. He plays as a striker/winger.

== Career ==
He started his youth football with Black Gold FC and Adamawa United FC respectively. In 2002, he moved to Malta, signing for Naxxar Lions where he scored 18 goals in 16 league games that year and was so the top scorer of the First division in 2004. He was then attracting interest from top clubs in Malta such as Valletta F.C., Sliema Wanderers F.C. and clubs from Cyprus. He then signed for Valletta F.C. After leaving Valletta FC, he joined Al Ittihad Kalba in Dubai (U.A.E) on a 6-month deal. He moved back to Malta and joined Kercem Ajax F.C. He scored 18 goals to win the top scorer of the 2007 Div 1 League. He then attracted the interests of some clubs in Italy, Portugal and Russia. He is a power forward who has been compared to Drogba, with his style of play. He played in the Portuguese Super Liga after signing a 3-year contract with Estrela da Amadora;. After Impressing in trials with Crystal Palace, Plymouth Argyle and Notts County, after much negotiations, with Notts County and Argyle unable to reach a deal to sign the forward, Ani signed with Rotherham United, to start his first spell in English football. He made his debut for the Millers in their 1–0 win over Lincoln City in the Football League Trophy on 31 August 2010. He also played for APOP Kinyras FC in the top league of Cyprus. In 2012, he moved back to Malta and joined Sliema Wanderers F.C.

In January 2014, Ani joined Maltese First Division side Pieta' Hotspurs and made his debut on Wednesday 22 January 2014 in a Trophy match, with his side beating Hiberians F.C.

== International career ==
He featured for the U-17 junior national team of Nigeria. Ani was involved in the buildup to the 2008 Olympic games for Nigeria U-23 national side, as he was regularly called up to the national side by Samson Siasia, who was the head coach. He featured for the Nigerian Olympic squad in 2008. He was also part of the Nigerian U-23 team that won the Intercontinental Cup in Malaysia in 2008.
