= Omar García (footballer, born 1983) =

Spanish footballer

Personal information
- Full name: Omar García Azofra
- Date of birth: 7 September 1983 (age 43)
- Place of birth: Logroño, Spain
- Height: 1.86 m (6 ft 1 in)
- Position: Forward

Team information
- Current team: SD Logroñés

Youth career
- CD Logroñés
- Athletic Bilbao

Senior career*
Years	Team	Apps	(Gls)
2002–2003	Zamudio		
2003–2004	Alfaro	9	(2)
2004–2008	CD Logroñés		
2008–2009	Rotherham United	2	(0)
2009–2011	Gandía		
2011–2013	SD Logroñés		
2016	La Calzada		
- * Club domestic league appearances and goals

Omar García Azofra (born 7 September 1983) is a Spanish former professional footballer who played as a forward.

== Football career ==
An unsuccessful Athletic Bilbao youth graduate, García played in his early years in his country for Zamudio SD, CD Alfaro and CD Logroñés, never in higher than Segunda División B. On 1 September 2008, he signed a one-year contract with League Two side Rotherham United.

García made his official debut for his new club on 1 November 2008, against Wycombe Wanderers. His next appearance came three days later in the Football League Trophy 2–0 win against Leicester City, and he also featured in the FA Cup first-round tie against Aldershot Town, on the 8th.

García made his second and last league appearance with the Millers on 15 November 2008, against Gillingham. On 10 April of the following year he was told that he could leave the English club, and he returned to Spain with CF Gandía, also in the third level.

After 14 league appearances in 2010–11 (no goals), García moved down to Tercera División and joined SD Logroñés.
