= Luke Ashworth =

English footballer (born 1989)

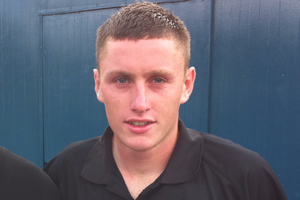
- Ashworth while at Rotherham United

Personal information
- Full name: Luke Alexander Ashworth
- Date of birth: 4 December 1989 (age 36)
- Place of birth: Bolton, England
- Position: Defender

Youth career
- 2006–2008: Wigan Athletic

Senior career*
Years	Team	Apps	(Gls)
2008–2009	Wigan Athletic	0	(0)
2008	→ Leyton Orient (loan)	3	(0)
2009–2010	Leyton Orient	10	(0)
2010–2011	Rotherham United	9	(0)
2011	Harrogate Town	9	(1)
2011–2012	FC Halifax Town	13	(0)
2012–2014	Hyde	72	(2)
2014	→ Chester (loan)	3	(0)
2014–2017	FC United of Manchester	112	(9)
2017–2018	Stalybridge Celtic	46	(1)
2018	FC United of Manchester	3	(0)
2018–2019	Ashton United	21	(0)
- * Club domestic league appearances and goals as of 14:54, 13 December 2023 (UTC)

Luke Alexander Ashworth (born 4 December 1989) is an English footballer who plays as a centre-back.

== Career ==
=== Early career ===
Born in Bolton, Greater Manchester, Ashworth made his professional debut during a loan period at Leyton Orient from his original club Wigan Athletic, in Orient's 4–2 Football League Trophy win against Southend United on 2 September 2008, and his league debut eleven days later. He returned to Wigan on 3 November 2008.

He signed for Leyton Orient on a permanent basis in January 2009, and scored his first professional goal for Orient in the FA Cup first round tie against Tranmere Rovers on 7 November 2009. On 23 June 2010, he left Orient on a free transfer and joined Rotherham United. After his release from Rotherham in the summer of 2011, he played for Harrogate Town between 9 September and 13 December, after which he signed for Halifax in December on a non-contract basis. He left the club in May 2012.

=== Hyde ===
After being released from Halifax at the end of the season, he moved up a division to go and play at Conference National newcomers Hyde. He made his debut for the club in the opening game of the 2012–13 season, in a 2–2 draw away at Braintree Town.

In March 2014 he joined Chester on loan until the end of the 2013–14 season, before moving to then-Northern Premier League Premier Division club FC United of Manchester in August 2014.

In July 2017 he joined Stalybridge Celtic.

In July 2018 he rejoined former club FC United of Manchester. In September he moved to Ashton United.

== Career statistics ==
As of 25 August 2014

Appearances and goals by club, season and competition
Club	Season	League			FA Cup		League Cup		Other		Total	
Club	Season	Division	Apps	Goals	Apps	Goals	Apps	Goals	Apps	Goals	Apps	Goals
Wigan Athletic	2008–09	Premier League	0	0	0	0	0	0	0	0	0	0
Leyton Orient (loan)	2008–09	League One	3	0	0	0	0	0	2 (Note: Appearance(s) in [[EFL Trophy]Football League Trophy]])	0	5	0
Leyton Orient	2009–10	League One	10	0	1	1	0	0	2	0	13	1
Leyton Orient	Total		13	0	1	1	0	0	4	0	18	1
Rotherham United	2010–11	League Two	9	0	1	0	1	0	2	0	13	0
Harrogate Town	2011–12	Conference North	9	1	0	0	—		0	0	9	1
FC Halifax Town	2011–12	Conference North	13	0	0	0	—		0	0	13	0
Hyde United	2012–13	Conference Premier	45	2	2	0	—		2 (Note: Appearance(s) in FA Trophy)	0	49	2
Hyde United	2013–14	Conference Premier	22	0	1	0	—		1	0	24	0
Hyde United	2014–15	Conference North	5	0	0	0	—		0	0	5	0
Hyde United	Total		72	2	3	0	—		3	0	78	2
Chester (loan)	2013–14	Conference Premier	3	0	—		—		0	0	3	0
Career total			190	21	22	1	0	0	18	2	230	24
