= Adam Le Fondre =

English footballer (born 1986)

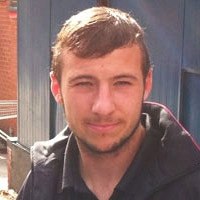
- Le Fondre in 2010

Personal information
- Full name: Glenville Adam James Le Fondre
- Date of birth: 2 December 1986 (age 39)
- Place of birth: Stockport, England
- Height: 5 ft 11 in (1.80 m)
- Position: Striker

Team information
- Current team: FC United of Manchester

Youth career
- –2004: Stockport County

Senior career*
Years	Team	Apps	(Gls)
2004–2007	Stockport County	63	(18)
2007	→ Rochdale (loan)	7	(4)
2007–2009	Rochdale	91	(34)
2009–2011	Rotherham United	93	(52)
2011–2014	Reading	104	(39)
2014–2017	Cardiff City	23	(3)
2015	→ Bolton Wanderers (loan)	17	(8)
2015–2016	→ Wolverhampton Wanderers (loan)	26	(3)
2016–2017	→ Wigan Athletic (loan)	12	(1)
2017	→ Bolton Wanderers (loan)	19	(6)
2017–2018	Bolton Wanderers	36	(7)
2018–2023	Sydney FC	97	(56)
2020–2021	→ Mumbai City (loan)	20	(11)
2023–2024	Hibernian	23	(5)
2024–	FC United of Manchester	79	(31)
- * Club domestic league appearances and goals as of 06:13, 23 July 2026 (UTC)

Glenville Adam James Le Fondre (born 2 December 1986) is an English professional footballer who plays as a striker for Northern Premier League Premier Division club FC United of Manchester.

== Career ==
=== Stockport County ===
Born in Stockport, Greater Manchester, Le Fondre began his career at Stockport County, where he progressed through the club's Centre of Excellence youth system. He made his debut against Bury in 2004, scoring the third goal in a 3–1 victory.

=== Rochdale ===
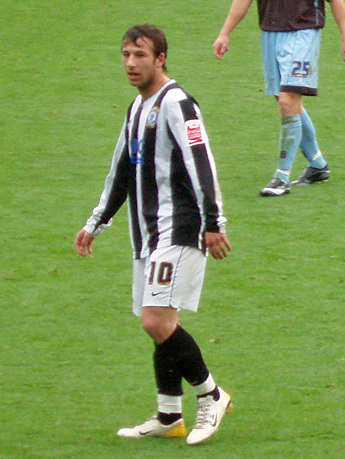
Le Fondre playing for Rochdale in 2007

Le Fondre joined Rochdale on loan from Stockport during the 2007 January transfer window, scoring twice on his debut in the 5–0 defeat of Milton Keynes Dons. Earlier that term, he scored four goals in one game for County as they beat Wrexham 5–2.

Having impressed everyone at the club during his loan spell, manager Keith Hill made Le Fondre's move permanent in the summer, and on 2 July 2007, Rochdale agreed an undisclosed fee for Le Fondre with Stockport, and signed a three-year deal the day after.

He featured in every game as the side made it all the way to the Play Off Final at the end of a season where he was the club's leading marksman. He continued his form into the 2008–09 season and finished the season as leading scorer with 21 goals and a series of Player of the Season awards.

=== Rotherham United ===
==== 2009–10 season ====
On 8 August 2009, Rotherham United agreed a fee with Rochdale for the striker, but the deal was thought to have fallen through due to Le Fondre wanting a longer contract. However, on 11 August, Le Fondre signed for the club on a three-year contract for an undisclosed fee.

I needed a new challenge, with a progressive club that had high ambitions and in Rotherham I've found the perfect club to open a new chapter of my career with. It was hard to leave Rochdale in the sense that I have left a lot of friends and the fans behind, but when a team with so much ambition like Rotherham comes in for you it is an opportunity you have got to take.

— Le Fondre on his move to Rotherham United, 11 August 2009

Le Fondre made his first start in a 2–1 victory at Grimsby Town in August, opening the scoring from the penalty spot. He scored again on his home debut, which came against former club Rochdale. His workrate and obvious talent endeared him to the Rotherham faithful and he quickly became a huge fans favourite. Le Fondre was nominated for the League Two Player of the Month award four times throughout the course of the 2009/10 season (August, September, November and February) though he failed to win the award and, was named in the PFA League Two Team of the Year, alongside fellow Rotherham players Ian Sharps and Nicky Law Jnr, as Rotherham finished fifth in Football League Two and qualified for the playoffs. Le Fondre scored once in each leg of the semi-finals against Aldershot Town as Rotherham ran out 3–0 winners on aggregate, before they lost 3–2 in the final against Dagenham & Redbridge. Le Fondre finished the season with 30 goals and was linked with moves to Championship clubs Derby County and Leicester City, though Rotherham denied a deal had been agreed with either club.

==== 2010–11 season ====
He scored four in one game for the second time in his career on 21 August 2010 in a remarkable 6–4 home victory over Cheltenham Town in the league. Huddersfield Town had a bid rejected for Le Fondre in January 2011. Le Fondre scored his 50th goal for the Millers in just 87 games with the second goal in a 2–0 win against Accrington Stanley on 15 February 2011. Le Fondre revealed in May 2011 that although he was happy to stay with Rotherham he revealed he was looking to sign for a club at a higher level.

=== Reading ===
==== 2011–12 season ====
On 27 August 2011, Le Fondre signed a three-year contract with Championship side Reading for a fee believed to be around £350,000. He scored his first goal for Reading in a 2–0 win against Doncaster Rovers on 17 September 2011 with a header from a Joseph Mills cross. His second goal for the club came in a 3–2 win away to Bristol City. He scored his first brace for Reading against Derby County on 18 October 2011 with a volley and then a close-range header from a Hal Robson-Kanu cross. His next goal came on 29 November against Peterborough in a 3–2 win. He ended a run of seven games without a goal when he scored the winning goal in a 2–1 win away to Watford on 14 January 2012 with a flick with his back to goal. On 3 March he came off the bench to score the winning goal against Millwall, giving Reading their sixth successive win. On 6 April, he scored a late brace as Reading beat Leeds United 2–0, sending Reading to the top of the Championship table in the process. On 13 April he scored twice as Reading beat promotion rivals Southampton 3–1, significantly boosting Reading's chances of promotion back to the Premier League. This also increased their title hopes by pushing a 3-point margin with 3 games to go. On 21 April, he came off the bench to score in a 2–2 draw against Crystal Palace, with the point helping to secure the Championship title.

==== 2012–13 season ====
On 18 August 2012, he scored on his Premier League debut during a 1–1 home draw with Stoke City at the Madejski Stadium, scoring a 90th-minute penalty to rescue a point for Reading. On 17 November 2012 he helped Reading to their first Premier League win of the season, netting both goals in a 2–1 victory over Everton. Le Fondre's next goal came in a 4–3 home defeat against his boyhood club Manchester United, after he headed home from a corner to make it 2–2. Le Fondre also scored against Arsenal on 17 December, but Reading were defeated 5–2 and remained at the foot of the Premier League table. He scored twice in a 3–1 win at Crawley Town in the FA Cup on 5 January 2013, and followed it up a week later, scoring a penalty in a 3–2 win over West Bromwich Albion, having been 2–0 down earlier in the game. Le Fondre's good form continued when he notched two goals against Newcastle United after coming off the bench on 19 January 2013 in a match that brought Reading their first away win of the season. He proceeded to single-handedly bring Reading back from 2–0 down to draw with Chelsea on 30 January, scoring two late goals, earning Reading a much needed point in their race against the drop. Le Fondre's five goals in January helped him to his and Reading's first ever Premier League Player of the Month award. Le Fondre ended a goal drought by coming off the bench to round Mark Schwarzer and slot home the third goal in Reading's 4–2 away win at Fulham. This also meant Le Fondre clinched the record for most Premier League goals in a season as a substitute. On 14 May, he was named Reading F.C. Player of the Season. He also scored in Reading's 4–2 defeat at West Ham United on the final day of the season, when he turned in Nick Blackman's cross to equalise after coming off the bench at half time. This meant Le Fondre ended the season with 14 goals, including 12 in the Premier League.

==== 2013–14 season ====
On 3 August 2013, Le Fondre scored on the opening day of the season at home to Ipswich Town which ended 2–1 win. Le Fondre scored back-to-back home hat-tricks against Bolton Wanderers and Blackpool on 18 and 28 January respectively. He finished the season with 15 goals from 38 league games. In total, Le Fondre scored 42 goals in 110 appearances in all competitions for Reading.

=== Cardiff City ===
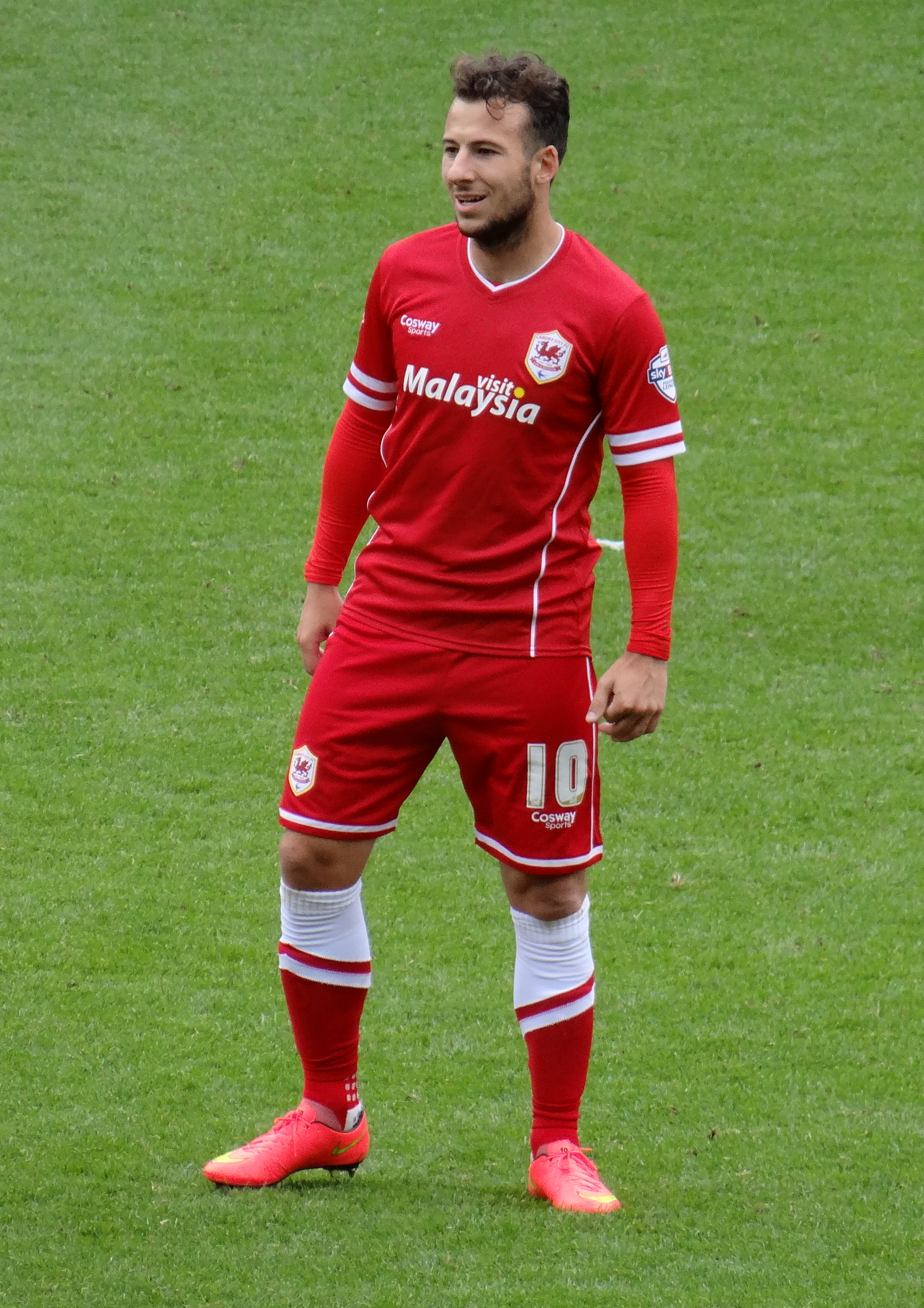
Le Fondre playing for Cardiff City in 2014

Le Fondre signed a three-year contract with Cardiff City on 28 May 2014 for an undisclosed fee. Le Fondre made his Cardiff City debut against Blackburn Rovers in a 1–1 draw in the opening match of the 2014–15 Championship season on 8 August 2014. He scored his first goal for Cardiff on 21 October 2014, in a 3–1 home win over Ipswich Town.

During the 2016–17 pre-season, Le Fondre was told he was free to find another club by new boss, Paul Trollope, and trained with the under-21 development squad. As Cardiff found themselves short on strikers and only scoring 4 in the opening 6 games of the season, he returned to the 18 man squad against Reading, but remained on the bench.

==== Bolton Wanderers (loan) ====
On 26 January 2015, Le Fondre joined Bolton Wanderers on loan for the remainder of the 2014–15 Championship season. His first goal for Bolton came in a 3–1 win against Fulham at the Macron Stadium after the keeper came out and left himself stranded after kicking his clearance straight at Le Fondre who lobbed the ball back into the net from 30 yards. Le Fondre made it 5 goals in his first 10 games for Bolton with a well taken brace in Bolton's 2–0 home win over Millwall on 14 March 2015. He finished the season as Bolton's highest scorer with eight goals.

==== Wolverhampton Wanderers (loan) ====
On 3 August 2015, Le Fondre joined Wolverhampton Wanderers on a season-long loan. On 29 August 2015, Le Fondre scored his first goal for Wolves with a late winner in a 2–1 home win over Charlton after coming off the bench. Le Fondre made 26 appearances for Wolves, 16 as a substitute, scoring 3 goals.

==== Wigan Athletic (loan) ====
On 31 August 2016, Le Fondre joined Wigan Athletic on a season long loan for the 2016–17 season. On 27 September 2016, Le Fondre made his Wigan debut as a starter against his former team Wolves. He made an immediate impact by scoring his first goal for Wigan after just 5 minutes in a 2–1 home victory.

=== Return to Bolton Wanderers ===
On 31 January 2017, Le Fondre's loan deal at Wigan was terminated to allow him to rejoin League One side Bolton Wanderers on loan until the end of the 2016–17 season.

On 6 June 2017, Bolton confirmed that Le Fondre had joined them on a two-year contract with the option of an extension.

=== Sydney FC ===
On 17 August 2018, Le Fondre joined A-League side Sydney FC after mutually terminating his contract with Bolton three days earlier. During the 2018–19 A-League season, he was part of the squad that defeated Perth Glory in the 2019 A-League Grand Final and finished the season as the second highest scorer in the league

On 23 April 2021, Le Fondre signed a new two-and-a-half-year contract with Sydney. He was released at the end of his contract on 12 June 2023. During his time at the club he helped them win two Championships, a Premiership, and helped them reach three consecutive Grand Finals. He was their all time joint higher scorer in the A-League, equal with Alex Brosque, as well as their second highest scorer overall with 73 total goals. All four full seasons he played for them, he was their leading scorer.

==== Mumbai City (loan) ====
On 7 October 2020, Le Fondre joined Mumbai City on loan for the 2020–21 Indian Super League season. Speaking about his arrival, Le Fondre said "I wouldn't have joined if I didn't think we could win something. They are a very strong squad and I expect us to do really well".

He made his debut for the club in a 1–0 defeat to NorthEast United on 21 November 2020, playing the full 90 minutes. He scored his first goal for Mumbai City in the club's next league match against Goa, converting a penalty in the fifth minute of stoppage time to secure a 1–0 victory for the Islanders.

In the club's next game against East Bengal on 1 December 2020, Le Fondre scored a brace in a convincing 3–0 win. His first goal was a tap-in following a Hugo Boumous assist, and the second coming from the penalty spot. On 9 December 2020, Le Fondre scored the winning goal against Chennaiyin to seal a 2–1 win.

Following goals against Hyderabad and Kerala Blasters, Le Fondre went on a five-game goalless streak, breaking his duck with a late goal off the bench in a 2–1 loss to NorthEast United on 30 January 2021. However, Le Fondre went on to score in the club's three following matches as well, against Kerala Blasters in a 2–1 win, against FC Goa in a 3–3 draw, and scoring a brace versus Bengaluru in a 4–2 loss.

Despite Le Fondre not scoring again, he played a vital role in Mumbai City winning the League Winners Shield, and the ISL Cup, becoming the first team to do the double. He scored 11 goals in 20 games, alongside 1 assist. This record meant Le Fondre finished as the fourth-highest goal scorer of the 2020–221 ISL season.

=== Hibernian ===
Le Fondre signed a one-year contract with Scottish Premiership club Hibernian on 16 June 2023. He was released by the club in June 2024, after scoring five goals in 30 appearances during the 2023–24 season.

=== FC United of Manchester ===
In July 2024, Le Fondre began training with FC United of Manchester. Having featured in several pre-season games, a formal contract offer was made to sign for the club and represent them in the Northern Premier League for the 2024–25 season. On 1 August 2024, it was confirmed by the club that Le Fondre had accepted the contract offer after "finding the clubs ambition matched his own".

== Other roles in football ==
In October 2024, Le Fondre was appointed as a video scout for City Football Group. He also makes occasional appearances as a public speaker.

== Personal life ==
Le Fondre attended Offerton School. He is also known by the nicknames ALF or, subsequently, Alfie, derived from his initials. He is a lifelong Manchester United fan and he cites his heroes as Eric Cantona and Ole Gunnar Solskjær. His second cousin Kian played in the academies of Bolton Wanderers and Burnley and subsequently dropped into non-league football.

== Career statistics ==
As of match played on 28 April 2026

Appearances and goals by club, season and competition
Club	Season	League			National cup (Note: Includes FA Cup, Australia Cup, Scottish Cup)		League cup (Note: Includes Football League Cup, Scottish League Cup)		Continental		Other		Total	
Club	Season	Division	Apps	Goals	Apps	Goals	Apps	Goals	Apps	Goals	Apps	Goals	Apps	Goals
Stockport County	2004–05	League One	20	4	0	0	0	0	—		2 (Note: Appearance(s) in Football League Trophy)	1	22	5
Stockport County	2005–06	League Two	22	7	2	0	1	1	—		1	0	26	8
Stockport County	2006–07	League Two	21	7	3	0	1	0	—		—		25	7
Stockport County	Total		63	18	5	0	2	1	—		3	1	73	20
Rochdale (loan)	2006–07	League Two	7	4	0	0	0	0	—		—		7	4
Rochdale	2007–08	League Two	46	16	1	1	2	0	—		4 (Note: One appearance in Football League Trophy, three in League Two play-offs)	0	53	17
Rochdale	2008–09	League Two	44	18	2	3	1	0	—		4 (Note: Two appearances in Football League Trophy, two in League Two play-offs)	0	51	21
Rochdale	2009–10	League Two	1	0	0	0	0	0	—		—		1	0
Rochdale	Total		91	34	3	4	3	0	—		8	0	105	38
Rotherham United	2009–10	League Two	44	25	3	2	0	0	—		4 (Note: One appearance and one goal in Football League Trophy, three appearances and two goals in League Two play-offs)	3	51	30
Rotherham United	2010–11	League Two	45	23	2	0	1	0	—		1	1	49	24
Rotherham United	2011–12	League Two	4	4	0	0	1	0	—		—		5	4
Rotherham United	Total		93	52	5	2	2	0	—		5	4	105	58
Reading	2011–12	Championship	32	12	1	0	0	0	—		—		33	12
Reading	2012–13	Premier League	34	12	3	2	0	0	—		—		37	14
Reading	2013–14	Championship	38	15	1	0	1	0	—		—		40	15
Reading	Total		104	39	5	2	1	0	—		—		110	41
Cardiff City	2014–15	Championship	23	3	1	0	1	0	—		—		25	3
Bolton Wanderers (loan)	2014–15	Championship	17	8	0	0	0	0	—		—		17	8
Wolverhampton Wanderers (loan)	2015–16	Championship	26	3	1	0	3	0	—		—		30	3
Wigan Athletic (loan)	2016–17	Championship	12	1	1	0	0	0	—		—		13	1
Bolton Wanderers (loan)	2016–17	League One	19	6	—		0	0	—		—		19	6
Bolton Wanderers	2017–18	Championship	35	7	1	0	2	0	—		—		38	7
Bolton Wanderers	2018–19	Championship	1	0	0	0	0	0	—		—		1	0
Bolton Wanderers	Total		36	7	1	0	2	0	—		—		39	7
Sydney FC	2018–19	A-League	27	16	3	3	—		5 (Note: Appearances in AFC Champions League)	2	2 (Note: Appearances in A-League play-offs)	2	37	23
Sydney FC	2019–20	A-League	26	20	1	0	—		2	1	2	1	31	22
Sydney FC	2020–21	A-League	5	3	0	0	—		—		2	1	7	4
Sydney FC	2021–22	A-League	21	7	2	1	—		6	3	—		29	11
Sydney FC	2022–23	A-League	18	10	3	1	—		—		3	2	24	13
Sydney FC	Total		97	56	9	5	—		13	5	9	6	128	73
Mumbai City (loan)	2020–21	Indian Super League	20	11	—		—		—		3 (Note: Appearances in Indian Super League play-offs)	0	23	11
Hibernian	2023–24	Scottish Premiership	23	5	1	0	2	0	3 (Note: Appearances in UEFA Europa Conference League)	0	—		29	5
FC United of Manchester	2024–25	Northern Premier League; Premier Division	41	16	2	0	—		—		3 (Note: Two appearances in FA Trophy, one appearance in FENIX Trophy)	1	46	17
FC United of Manchester	2025–26	Northern Premier League; Premier Division	38	15	2	1	—		—		4 (Note: Appearances in FA Trophy)	1	44	17
FC United of Manchester	Total		79	31	4	1	—		—		7	2	90	34
Career total			752	278	36	14	16	1	16	5	35	14	817	314

== Honours ==
Reading

- Football League Championship: 2011–12

Bolton Wanderers

- EFL League One runner-up: 2016–17

Sydney

- A-League Championship: 2018–19, 2019–20
- A-League Premiership: 2019–20

Mumbai City

- Indian Super League: 2020–21
- Indian Super League League Winners Shield: 2020–21

Individual

- PFA Team of the Year: 2009–10 League Two
- Premier League Player of the Month: January 2013
- Reading Player of the Season: 2012–13
- Reading F.C. Hall of Fame: 2022
- A-League Team of the Season: 2018–19, 2019–20
- FC United of Manchester Player of the Season: 2024–25
