= Castle Hill High School, Offerton =

Castle Hill High School
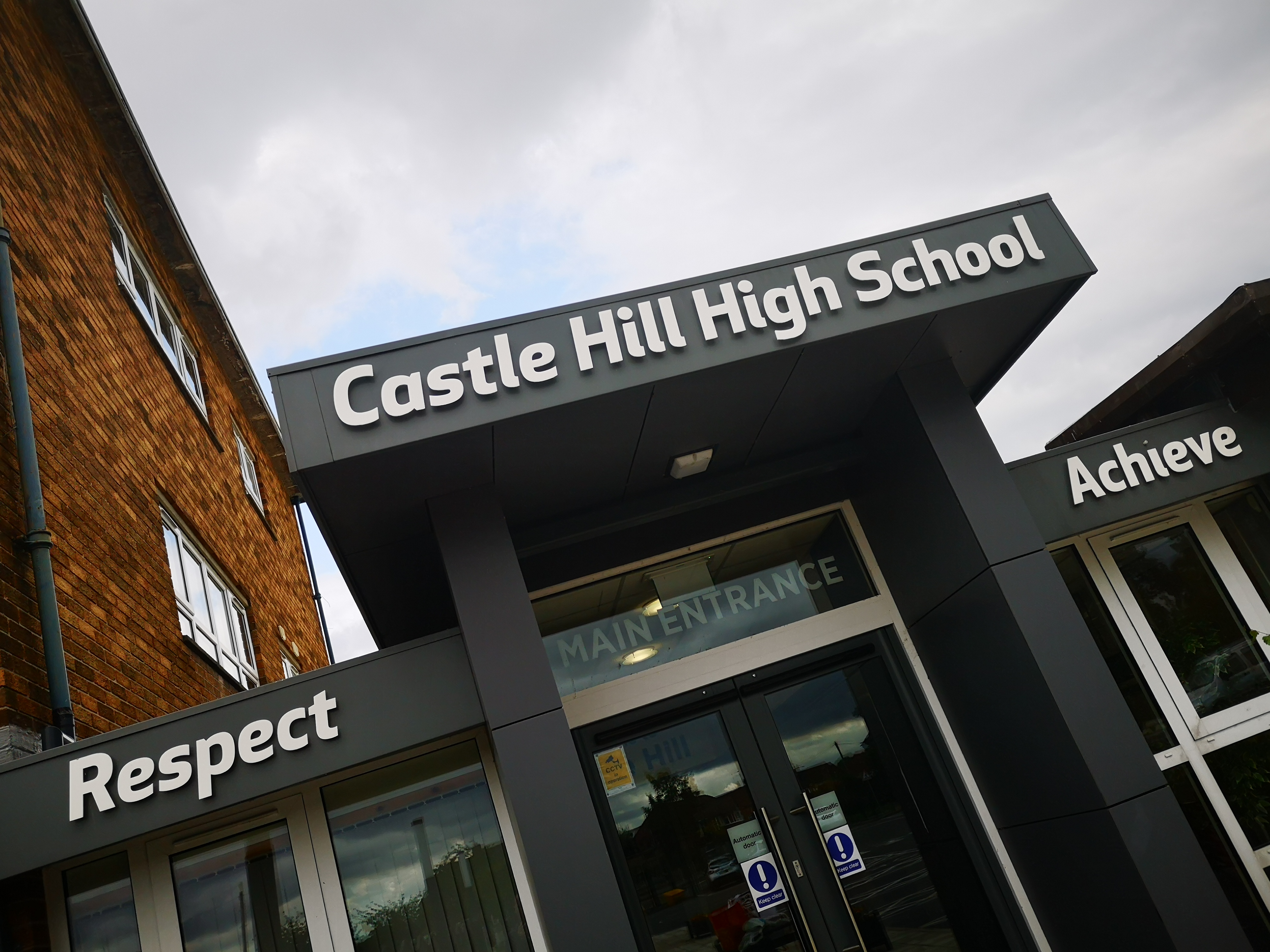
- Front entrance in 2019

Location
- The Fairway; Offerton, Greater Manchester; SK2 5DS; England

Information
- Type: Community special school
- School district: Stockport Borough
- Local authority: Stockport Council
- Department for Education URN: 106172 Tables
- Ofsted: Reports
- Headteacher: Anna Hudson
- Gender: Coeducational
- Age: 11 to 18
- Website: castlehill.stockport.sch.uk

Castle Hill High School is a community Special education School located in Offerton, Stockport, Greater Manchester. It is run by Stockport Metropolitan Borough Council and caters for pupils with moderate learning difficulties and complex needs, aged 11–18. It currently has about 180 pupils on roll.

== School site ==
The school moved to its current site in September 2014, having previously been located in the Brinnington area of Stockport. The Brinnington site was closed to make way for a housing development, as the closure of the adjacent Lapwing Sports Centre meant that the school had no sports or catering facilities. The school building is on the site of Offerton School, which closed in August 2012.
