= Jamie Green (footballer) =

English footballer

Personal information
- Date of birth: 18 August 1989 (age 37)
- Place of birth: Rossington, England
- Position: Left-back

Team information
- Current team: Rossington Main

Youth career
- –2007: Rotherham United

Senior career*
Years	Team	Apps	(Gls)
2007–2011	Rotherham United	62	(2)
2011	→ Boston United (loan)	5	(1)
2011	Grimsby Town	6	(1)
2012–2013	Rossington Main	25	(0)
2013	Worksop Parramore	4	(0)
2013–2017	Buxton	201	(6)
2017–2019	Handsworth Parramore	64	(1)
2019–2020	Gainsborough Trinity	12	(0)
2020–2021	Sheffield		
2021–	Rossington Main	45	(0)
- * Club domestic league appearances and goals as of 19:53, 1 November 2022 (UTC)

Jamie Green (born 18 August 1989) is an English professional footballer who plays as a left sided defender and wing back for Rossington Main.

He has previously played professionally for Rotherham United and Grimsby Town making 68 appearances combined, scoring three goals. He has also played at semi-professional level for Boston United, Rossington Main, Worksop Parramore, Buxton, Handsworth Parramore, Gainsborough Trinity and Sheffield.

== Career ==
=== Rotherham United ===
Green was brought through the ranks at Rotherham United in 2007. During his first season with United he broke through into the first team after some impressive performances in the reserves and he went on to finish with nine appearances and he scored one goal against Barnet on the final day of the 2007–08 season, it was also the last ever goal scored at Rotherham's historic home ground Millmoor. The following season Jamie became first choice left-back for the Millers, His second goal for the Millers in the 2–0 win over Gillingham at the Don Valley Stadium, was a great run and a fierce drive to seal the game. Jamie broke into the first team after a leg break to defender Stephen Brogan and made his debut as a substitute away in the 1–0 defeat to Wycombe Wanderers in February 2008. In May 2008 he was given a new one-year deal.

At the end of the 2010/2011 campaign he joined Conference North side Boston United on a short-term loan spell where he went on to score once in five appearances. He returned to Rotherham in May and was released following the end of his contract. During the summer Green went on trial with Bradford City in preparation for the 2011/2012 season but failed in his quest to earn a contract.

=== Grimsby Town ===
On 31 August 2011, the English transfer deadline day, Green signed with Conference National side Grimsby Town on non-contract basis. Green managed to dislodge regular left back Lee Ridley from the first team and did enough to earn himself a short-term contract. However following a series of injuries the club temporarily released him from his contract in order to recover. Grimsby opted to keep hold of his registration during this time and moved to sign Hull City left back Conor Townsend as a replacement.

=== Non-league ===
Green signed with Rossington Main in February 2012 on non-contract terms. In January 2013 he signed for Worksop Parramore. A month later Green moved to Buxton.

After playing in over 200 games for Buxton, Green departed for Handsworth Parramore on 27 June 2017. He joined Gainsborough Trinity during the 2019–20 season before signing for Sheffield in July 2020.

Green returned to Rossington Main in the summer of 2021.

== Personal life ==
He is also a qualified physiotherapist having graduated with First Class Honours from the University of Salford in 2016.
