= Stephen Brogan =

English footballer (born 1988)

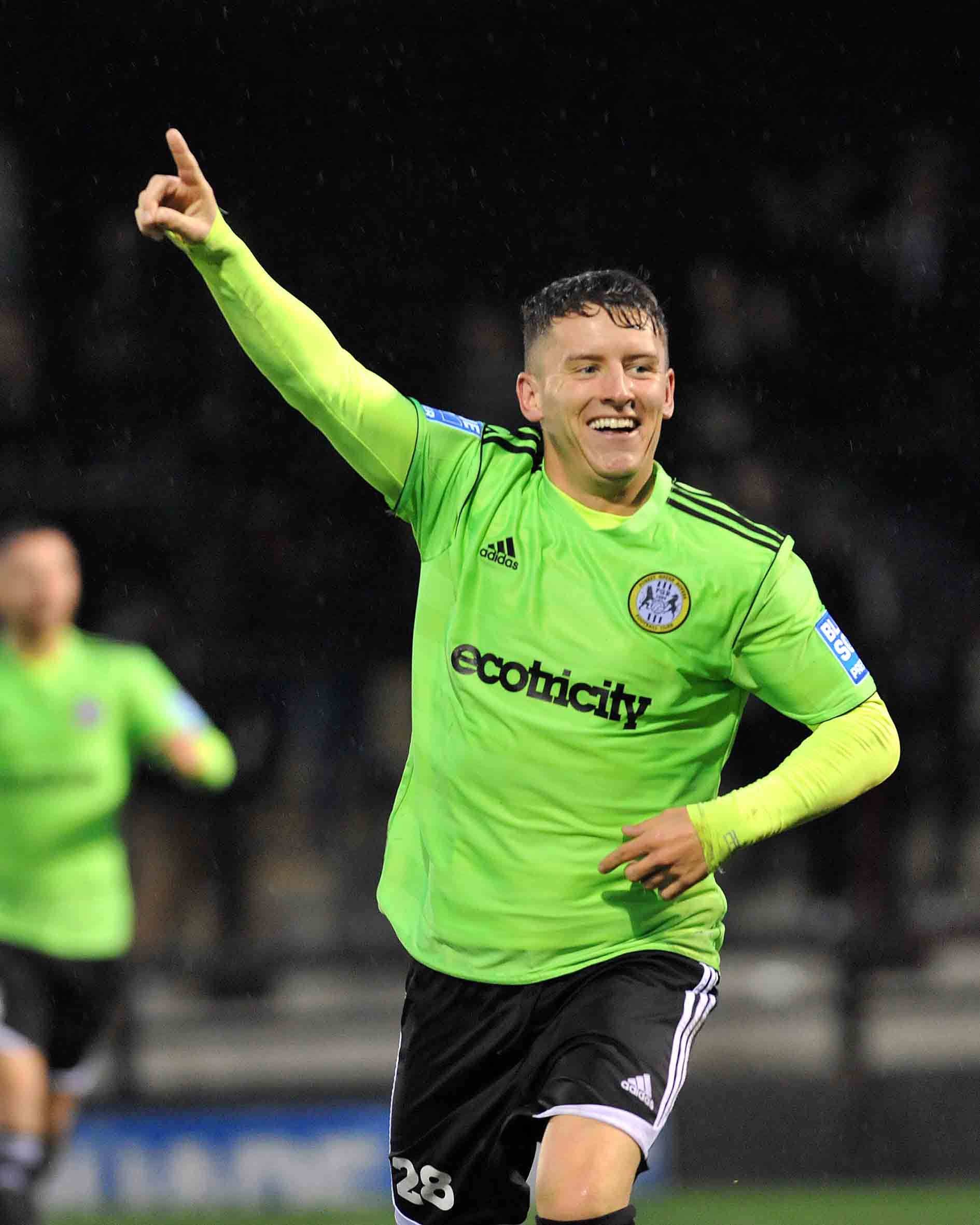
- Brogan playing for Forest Green Rovers in 2012/13

Personal information
- Date of birth: 12 April 1988 (age 38)
- Place of birth: Rotherham, England
- Height: 5 ft 8 in (1.73 m)
- Position: Utility player

Team information
- Current team: Hallam football club

Youth career
- 2003–2006: Rotherham United

Senior career*
Years	Team	Apps	(Gls)
2006–2011	Rotherham United	62	(6)
2011	→ Stalybridge Celtic (loan)	12	(3)
2011	Alfreton Town	2	(0)
2012	Stalybridge Celtic	28	(9)
2012	Guiseley	6	(2)
2012–2014	Forest Green Rovers	16	(2)
2014–2015	Southport	11	(0)
2015	Stalybridge Celtic	5	(0)
2015–2016	Gainsborough Trinity	37	(1)
2016–2017	North Ferriby United	28	(3)
2017–2018	Boston United	20	(0)
2018–2020	Spennymoor Town	63	(6)
2020–2021	Buxton	6	(0)
2021–	Stalybridge Celtic	23	(4)
2022-2024	Sheffield FC	96	(6)

International career^{‡}
2012	England C	2	(0)
- * Club domestic league appearances and goals as of 14:14, 4 May 2022 (UTC) ‡ National team caps and goals as of 23:28, 6 October 2012 (UTC)

Stephen Patrick Brogan (born 12 April 1988) is an English semi-professional footballer who plays for Retford Football Club. He has previously played in the Football League for Rotherham United.

A product of the youth academy at Rotherham, he made his senior debut 18 October 2005 against Accrington Stanley in the Football League Trophy. After suffering a serious injury where he sat out for fourteen months with a broken leg, he joined Stalybridge Celtic on a month's loan deal in January 2011, which was later extended, before returning to Rotherham in March.

He was eventually released by Rotherham and he returned to Stalybridge on a permanent deal. He then joined Guiseley, playing in the Conference North, but moved up a division to join Forest Green Rovers. He scored on his debut for Forest Green but after two seasons with the club was released. He then joined Southport in June 2014.

== Club career ==
=== Rotherham United ===
Born in Rotherham, South Yorkshire, Brogan broke into the Rotherham squad towards the end of the 2006–07 season, soon becoming an automatic choice making 18 starts. On 30 April 2007, Brogan signed a 2-year contract with the Millers. Brogan's consistent impressive displays the following season brought him much praise and frequent Man of the Match awards. As a result, it is reported that several Premier League clubs, including Tottenham Hotspur, showed an interest in signing the player, sending scouts to watch his performances.

Brogan was the forerunner to become player of the season 2007–08 until his horrific injury on 9 February, where he suffered a double fracture of his leg in a collision with MK Dons goalkeeper Willy Gueret. Brogan's absence, along with the club's financial problems, coincided with a huge dip in form for the Millers, who dropped out of the race for promotion. After fourteen months on the sidelines, Brogan came on as a substitute in the final game of the 2008–09 season vs Exeter City.

==== Stalybridge Celtic loan ====
On 10 January 2011, Brogan joined Stalybridge on loan for a month. He made his debut against Alfreton Town, in which he scored his first goal for the club in a 5–3 defeat. He went on to play another eleven games, scoring in both of their local derby matches against Hyde and Droylsden.

=== Alfreton Town ===
Following his release by the 'Millers', Brogan was signed by Alfreton Town on transfer deadline day 2011.

=== Stalybridge Celtic ===
He rejoined his former loan club having failed to settle at Alfreton Town.

=== Forest Green Rovers ===
On 18 September 2012, it was announced that Brogan has joined Conference National outfit Forest Green Rovers on a deal until the end of the season. Brogan made his Forest Green debut on 22 September 2012, scoring a stoppage time winner against Macclesfield Town. A groin injury kept him out of much of the second half of the 2012–13 season but he was rewarded with a new one-year contract on 11 April 2013. On 28 April 2014, he was released by Forest Green along with nine other players.

=== Southport ===
On 10 June 2014, Brogan signed for Southport in the Conference National. He made his Southport debut on 9 August 2014 in a home defeat against his former club, Forest Green Rovers.

=== Stalybridge Celtic ===
He then returned for a third spell with Stalybridge Celtic.

=== Gainsborough Trinity ===
His next move was to Gainsborough Trinity.

=== North Ferriby United ===
He then played for North Ferriby United.

=== Boston United ===
A spell in Lincolnshire followed with Boston United.

=== Spennymoor Town ===
In July 2018 he joined Spennymoor Town

=== Buxton ===
He joined Buxton.

=== A fourth spell at Stalybridge Celtic ===
In June 2021 he moved back to one of his former clubs, Stalybridge Celtic for his fourth period at the club.

== International career ==
In September 2012, Brogan received a call up to the England C team squad for an International Challenge Trophy tie against Belgium.

== Personal life ==
In February 2010 he appeared on an episode of Channel 4 cookery show Come Dine with Me along with the Chuckle Brothers as the host's guests.

== Career statistics ==
As of 24 September 2018

Appearances and goals by club, season and competition
Club	Season	League			FA Cup		League Cup		Other		Total	
Club	Season	Division	Apps	Goals	Apps	Goals	Apps	Goals	Apps	Goals	Apps	Goals
Rotherham United	2005–06	League One	3	0	0	0	0	0	2 (Note: Appearances in the Football League Trophy)	0	5	0
Rotherham United	2006–07	League One	23	0	0	0	0	0	1	0	24	0
Rotherham United	2007–08	League Two	29	3	2	1	1	0	2	0	34	4
Rotherham United	2008–09	League Two	1	0	0	0	0	0	0	0	1	0
Rotherham United	2009–10	League Two	5	1	3	1	0	0	0	0	8	2
Rotherham United	2010–11	League Two	1	0	1	0	1	0	1	0	4	0
Rotherham United	Rotherham total		62	4	6	2	2	0	6	0	76	6
Stalybridge Celtic (loan)	2010–11	Conference North	12	3	—		—		0	0	12	3
Alfreton Town	2011–12	Conference Premier	2	0	0	0	—		0	0	2	0
Stalybridge Celtic	2011–12	Conference North	28	9	0	0	—		3 (Note: Appearances in the FA Trophy)	0	31	9
Guiseley	2012–13	Conference North	6	2	0	0	—		0	0	6	2
Forest Green Rovers	2012–13	Conference Premier	13	2	1	0	—		2	0	16	2
Forest Green Rovers	2013–14	Conference Premier	3	0	1	0	—		0	0	4	0
Forest Green Rovers	Forest Green total		16	2	2	0	0	0	2	0	20	2
Southport	2014–15	Conference Premier	11	0	0	0	—		2	0	13	0
Stalybridge Celtic	2014–15	Conference North	5	0	0	0	—		0	0	5	0
Gainsborough Trinity	2014–15	Conference North	8	1	0	0	—		0	0	8	1
Gainsborough Trinity	2015–16	National League North	29	0	1	0	—		0	0	30	0
Gainsborough Trinity	Gainsborough total		37	1	1	0	0	0	0	0	38	1
North Ferriby United	2016–17	National League	15	2	1	0	—		1	0	17	2
North Ferriby United	2017–18	National League North	13	1	0	0	—		0	0	13	1
North Ferriby United	North Ferriby total		28	3	1	0	0	0	1	0	30	3
Boston United	2017–18	National League North	21	0	0	0	—		0	0	21	0
Spennymoor Town	2018–19	National League North	10	0	0	0	—		0	0	10	0
Career total			238	24	10	2	2	0	14	0	264	26
