= Danny Harrison (footballer) =

English footballer

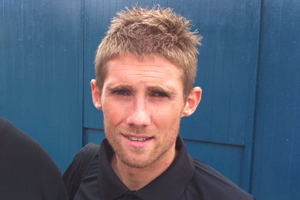
- Harrison in 2010

Personal information
- Full name: Daniel Robert Harrison
- Date of birth: 4 November 1982 (age 43)
- Place of birth: Liverpool, England
- Height: 5 ft 11 in (1.80 m)
- Position: Midfielder

Team information
- Current team: Colwyn Bay (Assistant Manager)

Youth career
- Tranmere Rovers

Senior career*
Years	Team	Apps	(Gls)
2001–2007	Tranmere Rovers	124	(5)
2007–2012	Rotherham United	185	(15)
2012–2013	Tranmere Rovers	13	(0)
2013–2015	Chester	29	(2)
2015–2021	Connah's Quay Nomads	153	(1)
2021–2024	Flint Town United	48	(3)
Total		552	(26)
- * Club domestic league appearances and goals

Daniel Robert Harrison (born 4 November 1982) is a former English footballer. He is now Assistant Manager at Cymru Premier club Colwyn Bay.

== Career ==
Born in Liverpool and formerly a resident of Upton, Harrison is a product of the Tranmere Rovers youth system. Joining the club as a 13-year-old, he was granted his first team debut in the 2001–02 season at home against Wigan Athletic. Harrison was a regular in the centre of midfield in the Brian Little era, but under Ronnie Moore he found opportunities harder to come by prompting a move to a new squad. He signed for Rotherham on 25 May 2007 along with Dale Tonge. He scored his first goal for the club against Sheffield Wednesday in the League Cup. He then bragged a brace against Dagenham & Redbridge. His next goal came away at Milton Keynes Dons, where he scored an equaliser with a 25-yard screamer 10 minutes from time.

He was released by Rotherham in May 2012.

On 7 June 2012, it was announced that he had rejoined Tranmere Rovers on a one-year contract from 1 July 2012. The following summer he dropped into the Conference National when he joined neighbours Chester.

He then moved into playing within the Welsh football pyramid, joining Connah's Quay Nomads in 2015. He left the club in August 2021 having made over 189 starts for the Nomads, with his service to the club at the time ranking him as seventh on the club all-time starts list. He then joined Flint Town United.

== Career statistics ==
Club	Season	Division	League		FA Cup		League Cup		Other		Total	
Club	Season	Division	Apps	Goals	Apps	Goals	Apps	Goals	Apps	Goals	Apps	Goals
Tranmere Rovers	2001–02	Division Two	1	0	0	0	0	0	1 (Note: Appearance(s) in Football League Trophy)	0	2	0
Tranmere Rovers	2002–03	Division Two	12	0	1	0	1	0	2	1	16	1
Tranmere Rovers	2003–04	Division Two	32	2	7	0	0	0	0	0	39	2
Tranmere Rovers	2004–05	League One	32	0	0	0	1	0	4 (Note: 3 appearance(s) in Football League Trophy) (Note: 1 appearance(s) in League One play-offs)	0	37	0
Tranmere Rovers	2005–06	League One	35	2	1	0	1	0	2	1	39	3
Tranmere Rovers	2006–07	League One	12	1	0	0	0	0	2	0	14	1
Total			124	5	9	0	3	0	11	2	147	7
Rotherham United	2007–08	League Two	44	4	2	0	1	1	2	0	49	5
Rotherham United	2008–09	League Two	33	1	1	0	4	1	3	1	41	3
Rotherham United	2009–10	League Two	37	4	3	0	1	0	4 (Note: 1 appearance(s) in Football League Trophy) (Note: 3 appearance(s) in League Two play-offs)	0	45	4
Rotherham United	2010–11	League Two	30	4	1	0	1	0	1	0	33	4
Rotherham United	2011–12	League Two	41	2	2	0	1	0	1	0	45	2
Total			185	15	9	0	8	2	11	1	213	18
Tranmere Rovers	2012–13	League One	13	0	2	0	2	0	1	0	18	0
Total			13	0	2	0	2	0	1	0	18	0
Chester	2013–14	Conference Premier	16	2	0	0	0	0	0	0	16	2
Chester	2014–15	Conference Premier	13	0	0	0	0	0	0	0	13	0
Total			29	2	0	0	0	0	0	0	29	2
Connah's Quay Nomads	2014–15	Welsh Premier League	12	0	1	0	0	0	0	0	13	0
Connah's Quay Nomads	2015–16	Welsh Premier League	26	0	1	0	2	0	0	0	29	0
Connah's Quay Nomads	2016–17	Welsh Premier League	25	0	2	0	0	0	0	0	27	0
Connah's Quay Nomads	2017–18	Welsh Premier League	29	0	3	0	1	0	1 (Note: Appearance(s) in Scottish Challenge Cup)	0	34	0
Connah's Quay Nomads	2018–19	Welsh Premier League	21	1	3	0	1	0	5	0	30	1
Connah's Quay Nomads	2019–20	Cymru Premier	19	0	1	0	3	0	0	0	23	0
Connah's Quay Nomads	2020–21	Cymru Premier	21	0	0	0	0	0	0	0	21	0
Total			153	1	11	0	7	0	6	0	177	1
Flint Town United	2021–22	Cymru Premier	17	0	1	0	0	0	0	0	18	0
Flint Town United	2022–23	Cymru Premier	31	3	0	0	0	0	0	0	31	3
Flint Town United	2023–24	Cymru North	0	0	1	0	0	0	0	0	1	0
Total			48	3	2	0	0	0	0	0	50	3
Career total			552	26	33	0	20	2	29	3	634	31
