= 2012–13 Rotherham United F.C. season =

Rotherham United
2012–13 season
- Chairman: Tony Stewart
- Manager: Steve Evans
- Stadium: New York Stadium; Don Street; Rotherham
- League Two: 2nd (promoted)
- League Cup: First Round
- FA Cup: Third Round
- Football League Trophy: First Round
- Top goalscorer: League: Daniel Nardiello (13); All: Daniel Nardiello (13)
- Highest home attendance: League: 11,441 vs Burton Albion (18 August 2012); All: 11,441 vs Burton Albion (18 August 2012)
- Lowest home attendance: League: 6271 vs Morecambe (23 October 2012); All: 3,975 vs York City (4 September 2012)
Home colours	Away colours

In the 2012–13 season, The Millers competed in League Two-the fourth tier in the football league. It was the 142nd season for the club since forming in 1870 as Thornhill and the fifth season in a row that Rotherham have been in League Two. It was a commemorative season for Rotherham United and a new chapter in the history books, as they returned home to Rotherham. They played their home games at The Don Valley Stadium in nearby city Sheffield, of which they had been shadowed by for 4 years since the dispute with Ken Booth, the owner of traditional home Millmoor-which forced them to leave. Rotherham's first game of the season was played on 18 August 2012, versus Burton Albion, in their new home; which was requested by chairman Tony Stewart because of the homecoming occasion. They came out victorious 3–0. Before the season began, the club were tipped by many bookies to lift the League Two title, leaving newly promoted Fleetwood Town and local rivals Chesterfield in their tracks. United were also tipped to be one of numerous favourites to contest the Football League Trophy, however they were out in the first round prior to a 1–0 defeat to York City.

Just one week prior to the first league encounter, Rotherham faced a trip to Yorkshire rivals, Hull City, in a League Cup first round fixture. They were knocked out 7-6 on penalties.

Rotherham United won promotion to League One after finishing second in the league.

== Kit ==
The first kit (1925)

Rotherham wear traditional colours red and white as their home kit. On the right shoulder, there is a solid white bar, with the black Puma logo on it, due to them being the kit manufacturers. Below it is the town crest, put on as a symbolic representative of the move back to Rotherham. It retains the sponsorship of local shopping centre Parkgate. The away kit is an amber and black coloured strip. The reason behind the chosen colours is that in 1925, when Rotherham Town and Thornhill United merged to become Rotherham United, their first ever kit was amber with a black rugby-like 'V' design on the chest. However, this season's away top is a thick, black bar across the chest, with the badge on the left, Puma logo in the centre and the town crest on the right. This kit also retains sponsorship from last season, with One Town One Community.

== Season fixtures ==
18 August 2012 1	Rotherham United	3–0	Burton Albion	Rotherham
15:00	Nardiello 4' (pen.); Odejayi 12'; Pringle 74'	Match Report	Lee Bell (yellow card) 59' (yellow-red card) 61'	Stadium: New York Stadium; Attendance: 11,441; Man of the Match: Kayode Odejayi

21 August 2012 2	Northampton Town	2–1	Rotherham United	Northampton
19:45	Hackett 25'; Nicholls 86'	Match Report	Pringle 37'	Stadium: Sixfields Stadium; Attendance: 4171

25 August 2012 3	Chesterfield	1–1	Rotherham United	Chesterfield
15:00	Bowery 3'	Match Report	Odejayi 51'	Stadium: Proact Stadium; Attendance: 7232

1 September 2012 4	Rotherham United	4–0	Bradford City	Rotherham
15:00	O'Connor 2'; Evans 24', 86'; Ben Pringle 37'	Match Report		Stadium: New York Stadium; Attendance: 11,199

8 September 2012 5	Port Vale	6–2	Rotherham United	Burslem, Stoke-on-Trent
15:00	Dodds 5'; Pope 15', 17', 65', 78'; Vincent 25'	Match Report	O'Connor 30'; Nardiello 51' (pen.)	Stadium: Vale Park; Attendance: 5544

15 September 2012 6	Rotherham United	1–0	Torquay United	Rotherham
15:00	Alex Revell 34'	Match Report		Stadium: New York Stadium; Attendance: 7405; Man of the Match: Ben Pringle

18 September 2012 7	Rotherham United	2–3	Rochdale	Rotherham
19:45	Revell 59'; Nardiello 62'	Match Report	Adebola 45+1'; Grant 71' (pen.); Mcintyre 78'	Stadium: New York Stadium; Attendance: 6783; Man of the Match: Ben Pringle

22 September 2012 8	Barnet	0–0	Rotherham United	Barnet
15:00		Match Report	Revell (red card)	Stadium: Underhill Stadium; Attendance: 1821

29 September 2012 9	Rotherham United	3–1	Oxford United	Rotherham
15:00	O'Connor 30' (pen.), 74'; Taylor 86'	Match Report	Sean Rigg 8'	Stadium: New York Stadium; Attendance: 7258; Man of the Match: Michael O'Connor

6 October 2012 10	York City	0–0	Rotherham United	York, North Yorkshire
15:00		Match Report		Stadium: Bootham Crescent; Attendance: 5417

13 October 2012 11	Rotherham United	0–3	Southend United	Rotherham
15:00		Match Report	Assombalonga 56', 66'; Martin 74'	Stadium: New York Stadium; Attendance: 7328; Man of the Match: Bob Harris

20 October 2012 12	Aldershot Town	0–3	Rotherham United	Aldershot
15:00		Match Report	Frecklington 33'; Harris 56'; Revell 82'	Stadium: Recreation Ground; Attendance: 1754

23 October 2012 13	Rotherham United	2–1	Morecambe	Rotherham
19:45	Nardiello 61', 62'	Match Report	Ellison 37'	Stadium: New York Stadium; Attendance: 5971; Man of the Match: Daniel Nardiello

27 October 2012 14	Rotherham United	1–0	Plymouth Argyle	Rotherham
15:00	Agard 74'	Match Report		Stadium: New York Stadium; Attendance: 6938; Man of the Match: Kari Arnason

6 November 2012 15	Fleetwood Town	1–1	Rotherham United	Fleetwood
19:45	Parkin 21'	Match Report	Arnason 19'	Stadium: Highbury; Attendance: 2498

10 November 2012 16	Dagenham & Redbridge	5–0	Rotherham United	Dagenham, Greater London
15:00	Gayle 5', 90+1'; Howell 35', 75'; Elito 80'	Match Report		Stadium: Victoria Road; Attendance: 1720

17 November 2012 17	Rotherham United	4–2	Cheltenham Town	Rotherham
15:00	Nardiello 4', 29'; Pringle 20'; Frecklington 90+2'	Match Report	Lowe 1'; Zebroski 37'	Stadium: New York Stadium; Attendance: 6705

20 November 2012 18	Rotherham United	2–3	Wycombe Wanderers	Rotherham
19:45	Nardiello 1'; Bradley 35'		Winefield 29'; McClure 50', 55'	Stadium: New York Stadium; Attendance: 5688

24 November 2012 19	Exeter City	0–1	Rotherham United	Exeter, Devon
15:00			Sharps 42'	Stadium: St James Park; Attendance: 3954

27 November 2012 20	Accrington Stanley	1–2	Rotherham United	Accrington
19:45	Winnard 2'		Nardiello 5', 48'	Stadium: Crown Ground

8 December 2012 21	Rotherham United	1–2	Gillingham	Don Street, New York Stadium
15:00	Taylor 69'		Burton 11', 57'	Stadium: New York Stadium; Attendance: 8029

15 December 2012 22	AFC Wimbledon	0–1	Rotherham United	Kingston upon Thames, London
15:00			Agard 79'	Stadium: Kingsmeadow; Attendance: 3,718

26 December 2012 23	Rotherham United	1–2	Port Vale	Rotherham
15:00	Agard 83'		Dodds 56'; Pope 63'	Stadium: New York Stadium

29 December 2012 24	Rotherham United	4–1	Accrington Stanley	Rotherham
15:00	Eckersley 48' (o.g.); Nardiello 63', 74'; O'Conner 77'		Lindfield 40'	Stadium: New York Stadium; Attendance: 7304

1 January 2013 25	Rochdale	2–1	Rotherham United	Rochdale, Greater Manchester
19:45	Grimes 29'		Odejayi 29'; Cameron 90'	Stadium: Spotland

12 January 2013 26	Rotherham United	0–2	Barnet	Rotherham
15:00			Hyde 21'; Yiadom 82'	Stadium: New York Stadium; Attendance: 7434

26 January 2013 27	Rotherham United	1–3	Bristol Rovers	Rotherham
15:00	Noble 73'	Match Report	Brown 43' (pen.); Harrison 53'; Anyisah 61'	Stadium: New York Stadium; Attendance: 6582

2 February 2013 28	Rotherham United	3–1	Northampton Town	Rotherham
15:00	Nardiello 42'; Pringle 72'; Noble 79'	Report	Carlisle 90'	Stadium: New York Stadium; Attendance: 7,739; Referee: Miller

9 February 2013 29	Burton Albion	2–0	Rotherham United	Burton upon Trent
15:00	Kee 36', 55'	Report		Stadium: Pirelli Stadium; Attendance: 3,967; Referee: Ilderton

12 February 2013 30	Torquay United	1–3	Rotherham United	Torquay, Torbay
15:00	Bodin 90'		Frecklington 46'; Revell 59'; Odejayi 90'	Stadium: Plainmoor; Attendance: 1,178

16 February 2013 31	Rotherham United	1–0	Chesterfield	Don Street, New York Stadium
15:00	Mullins			Stadium: New York Stadium

19 February 2013 32	Bristol Rovers	1–2	Rotherham United	Horfield, Bristol
15:00	Anyinsah 81'		Odejayi 60'; Frecklington 62'	Stadium: Memorial Stadium; Attendance: 8,646

26 February 2013 33	Rotherham United	1–1	York City	Rotherham
19:45	Nardiello 90'		Blair 63'	Stadium: New York Stadium

2 March 2013 34	Southend United	1–1	Rotherham United	Southend-on-Sea, Essex
15:00	Kevan Hurst 73'		Mullins 88'	Stadium: Roots Hall; Attendance: 4,983

5 March 2013 35	Oxford United	0–4	Rotherham United	Oxford
15:00			Noble 30'; Árnason 33'; Mullins 41'; Pringle 44'	Stadium: Kassam Stadium; Attendance: 5,169

9 March 2013 36	Rotherham United	1–2	Dagenham & Redbridge	Rotherham
15:00	Davis 66'		Elito 59'; Wilkinson 82'	Stadium: New York Stadium; Attendance: 7,309

12 March 2013 37	Wycombe Wanderers	2–2	Rotherham United	High Wycombe
19:45	Grant 7'; Doherty 81'	Report	Nardiello 51', 64'	Stadium: Adams Park; Attendance: 2,581; Referee: Bratt

16 March 2013 38	Cheltenham Town	3–0	Rotherham United	Cheltenham
15:00	McGlashan 32'; Pack 41'; Elliott 84'			Stadium: Whaddon Road; Attendance: 3,241

29 March 2013 39	Rotherham United	1–0	AFC Wimbledon	Rotherham
15:00	Revell 76'			Stadium: New York Stadium; Attendance: 7,594

1 April 2013 40	Gillingham	1–0	Rotherham United	Gillingham
15:00	Burton 22'			Stadium: Priestfield Stadium; Attendance: 6,796

6 April 2013 41	Morecambe	2–1	Rotherham United	Morecambe
15:00	Threlfall; Ellison 90'		Revell 64'	Stadium: Globe Arena; Attendance: 2,197

9 April 2013 42	Rotherham United	4–1	Exeter City	Rotherham
15:00	Pringle 1'; Nardiello 28'; O'Connor 30'; Morgan 51'		Coles 77'	Stadium: New York Stadium; Attendance: 6,703

13 April 2013 43	Rotherham United	2–1	Fleetwood Town	Rotherham
15:00	Nardiello 3'; Agard 62'		Ball 6'	Stadium: New York Stadium; Attendance: 7,360

16 April 2013 44	Bradford City	0–2	Rotherham United	Bradford, West Yorkshire
15:00			Frecklington 80'; Agard 90'	Stadium: Valley Parade; Attendance: 13,461

20 April 2013 45	Plymouth Argyle	0–1	Rotherham United	Plymouth, Devon
15:00			Agard 75'	Stadium: Home Park; Attendance: 10,648

27 April 2013 46	Rotherham United	2–0	Aldershot Town	Rotherham
15:00	Mullins 64'; Frecklington 90'			Stadium: New York Stadium; Attendance: 11,300

=== Pre-season ===
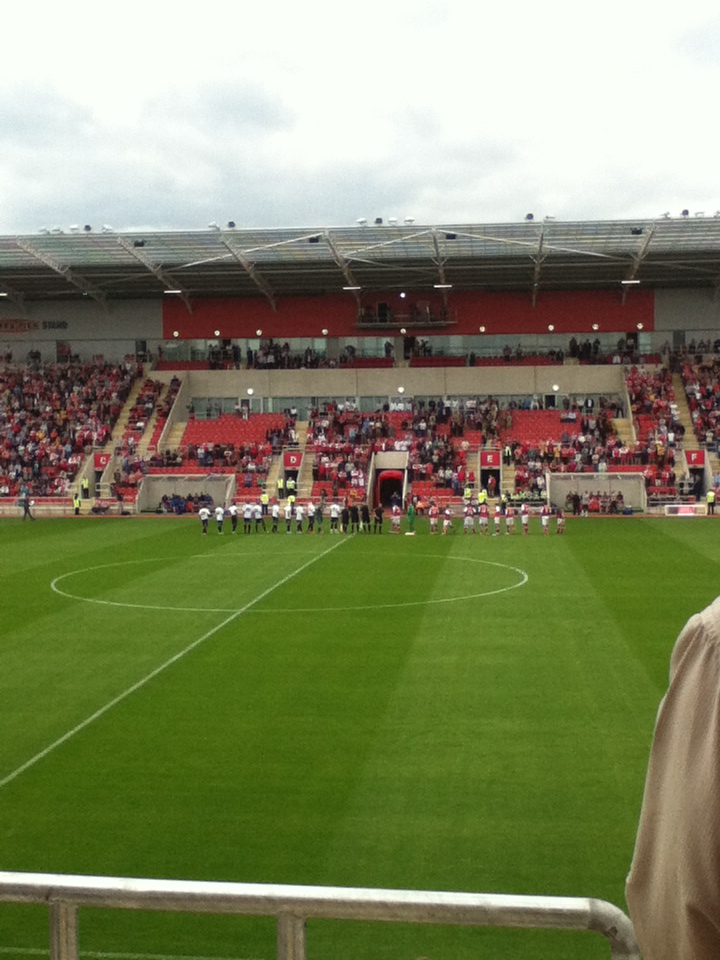
Rotherham line-up with Barnsley in the first ever game to be held at The New York Stadium.

The first training session of the season was held on week commencing 2 July 2012, 13 days previous to the first pre-season fixture against local team Parkgate. It was a vital time, as the players got a long jog and light training to get back into the football routine; as well as meeting the summer recruitments. On 14 July 2012, a few hours after the 0-6 victory against Parkgate, The Millers flew out to a training camp in the Algarve District of Portugal. On 18 July 2012, Rotherham locked horns with nearby training Oldham Athletic. Managed by Paul Dickov, Oldham were a stature of whom were a League One side. Surprisingly, Steve Evans' men came out on top 3–1. The players returned home the next day to prepare for the upcoming pre-season.

For Rotherham, not just the club but the fans too, this was a special pre-season. The first ever match at their new home venue The New York Stadium would be staged during this period of time. However, this match was just one quarter of stadia safety certificate matches. The opponents in these games, of which were two Yorkshire rivals in Barnsley and Doncaster Rovers, would stage 6,000 and 9,000 maximum capacity matches respectively. The 2012 Scottish Cup champions Hearts, and local rivals Sheffield United would both stage maximum (12,000) capacity matches, also respectively. These fixtures were simply to ensure that the facilities of the ground were able to cope with match-day standards.

Other games included away trips to Mansfield Town, Stocksbridge Park Steels, Stamford, a short journey to local lads Dinnington Town, and an encounter at Nene Park against Kettering Town.

Rotherham fans grew ever confident that the club would be successful this year. The performances were "too good for the league" according to many fans, and it was justified with victories over higher league outfits Oldham, Doncaster and Barnsley. Comments from other supporters suggested that the players brought in were Championship quality, and would tear other teams such as Barnet and Accrington Stanley to pieces.

14 July 2012	Parkgate	0–6	Rotherham United	Rawmarsh, Rotherham
12:00		Match Report	?? (o.g.); Denton (x2); Revell; Odejayi; Nardiello	Stadium: Roundwood Sports Complex; Attendance: 810

18 July 2012	Rotherham United	3–1	Oldham Athletic	Vilamoura, Loulé
10:30	Taylor 10'; Evans (penalty missed); Revell 55'; Nardiello 71'	Match Report	M'Changama 75'	Attendance: 0 (BCD)

21 July 2012	Rotherham United	2–1	Barnsley	Rotherham
15:00	Noble 42'; Odejayi 44'	Match Report	Mellis 40'	Stadium: New York Stadium; Attendance: 6,000; Man of the Match: Ben Pringle

24 July 2012	Rotherham United	2–1	Doncaster Rovers	Rotherham
19:45	Bradley 69'; Agard 79'	Match Report	Cotterill 54'	Stadium: New York Stadium; Attendance: 5967; Man of the Match: Johnny Mullins

27 July 2012	Dinnington Town	3–2	Rotherham United XI	Dinnington
			Beavers; Denton	Stadium: Phoenix Park; Attendance: 100

28 July 2012	Rotherham United	0–1	Heart Of Midlothian	Rotherham
14:00		Match Report	Sutton 47'	Stadium: New York Stadium; Attendance: 5891; Man of the Match: Ben Pringle

31 July 2012	Rotherham United	0–1	Sheffield United	Rotherham
19:45		Match Report	Cofie 41'	Stadium: New York Stadium; Attendance: 11033; Referee: Howard Webb; Man of the Match: Ben Pringle

1 August 2012	Stocksbridge Park Steels	1–3	Rotherham United	Stocksbridge
19:45	Sanasay 23'	Match Report	O'Connor 30' (pen.); Agard 38'; Revell 63'	Stadium: Look Local Stadium; Attendance: 1700

4 August 2012	Mansfield Town	2–3	Rotherham United	Mansfield
15:00	Stevenson 46'; Green 73'	Match Report	Árnason 25'; Nardiello 36'; Bradley 70'	Stadium: Field Mill; Attendance: 1300

7 August 2012	Stamford AFC	1–3	Rotherham United	Stamford
19:45	Gibson 64'	Match Report	Agard 2'; Revell 47' (pen.), 78'	Stadium: PK Arena; Attendance: 1300

14 August 2012	Kettering Town	0–2	Rotherham United	Irthlingborough
19:45	Bonnett-Johnson (penalty missed)	Match Report	Revell 83'; Denton 86'	Stadium: Nene Park

=== FA Cup ===
3 November 2012 First Round Proper	Rotherham United	3–2	Stevenage	Rotherham
15:00	Bradley 36'; Frecklington 55', 57'	Match Report	Dunne 60'; Morais 72'	Stadium: New York Stadium; Attendance: 4324; Man of the Match: Mark Bradley

1 December 2012 Second Round Proper	Rotherham United	1–1	Notts County	Rotherham
15:00	Pringle 43'		Arquin 32'	Stadium: New York Stadium; Attendance: 7,903

18 December 2012 Second Round Proper	Notts County	0–3	Rotherham United	Meadow Lane
9:45			Pringle 9'; Bradley 22'; Nardiello 41'	Attendance: 2,990

5 January 2013 Third Round Proper	Aldershot Town	3–1	Rotherham United
9:45	Hylton 6', 23', 62'		Frecklington 71' (pen.)	Attendance: 2,990

=== League Cup ===
11 August 2012 1st Round	Hull City	1–1 (a.e.t.) (7–6 p)	Rotherham United	Kingston upon Hull
15:00	McLean 70'	Match Report	Ainsworth 52'	Stadium: KC Stadium
	Penalties
	Fryatt (penalty scored); Koren (penalty scored); McLean (penalty scored); Proschwitz (penalty scored); Chester (penalty scored); Stewart (penalty scored); Cairney (penalty scored)		(penalty scored) Noble; (penalty scored) Mullins; (penalty scored) Agard; (penalty scored) Árnason; (penalty scored) Pringle; (penalty scored) Taylor; (penalty missed) Bradley

=== Football League Trophy ===
4 September 2012 Round 1	Rotherham United	0–1	York City	Rotherham
19:30			Blair 80'	Stadium: New York Stadium; Attendance: 3975

== Squad statistics ==
Everything below is not up-to-date Note: Flags indicate national team as defined under FIFA eligibility rules; some limited exceptions apply. Players may hold more than one non-FIFA nationality.

No.	Pos.	Nation	Player
21	GK	ENG	Andy Warrington
1	GK	SCO	Scott Shearer
23	DF	ENG	Josh Morris (on loan from Blackburn)
5	DF	ENG	Ian Sharps (C)
2	DF	ENG	Dale Tonge
18	DF	ENG	Nicky Hunt
3	DF	ENG	Lawrie Wilson
20	DF	WAL	Craig Morgan
14	DF	WAL	Mark Bradley
11	MF	ENG	Gareth Evans
8	MF	ENG	Jason Taylor
15	MF	ENG	Ben Pringle
31	MF	ENG	Courtney Cameron (on loan from Aston Villa F.C. Reserves and Academy)

No.	Pos.	Nation	Player
27	MF	IRL	Lee Frecklington
24	MF	ENG	Mitch Rose
7	MF	ENG	Lionel Ainsworth
4	MF	ISL	Kári Árnason
28	MF	ENG	Luke Rooney (on loan from Swindon)
32	MF	ENG	Nicky Walker
10	MF	NIR	Michael O'Connor
19	MF	ENG	David Noble
17	FW	WAL	Daniel Nardiello
9	FW	ENG	Alex Revell
25	FW	ENG	Alec Denton
16	FW	NGA	Kayode Odejayi
22	FW	ENG	Kieran Agard

=== Out on Loan ===
Note: Flags indicate national team as defined under FIFA eligibility rules; some limited exceptions apply. Players may hold more than one non-FIFA nationality.

No.	Pos.	Nation	Player
6	DF	ENG	Johnny Mullins (at Oxford United)
26	MF	ENG	Danny Schofield (at Accrington Stanley)

=== Goals, Appearances and Disciplinary ===
As of 8 November 2012

No.	Pos.	Name	League		FA Cup		League Cup		League Trophy		Total		Discipline	
No.	Pos.	Name	Apps	Goals	Apps	Goals	Apps	Goals	Apps	Goals	Apps	Goals	Yellow card	Red card
21	GK	(England) Andy Warrington	6	0	1	0	0	0	1	0	8	0	0	0
1	GK	(Scotland) Scott Shearer	11	0	0	0	1	0	0	0	12	0	1	0
20	DF	(Wales) Craig Morgan	12+1	0	1	0	0	0	0	0	13+1	0	3	0
6	DF	(England) Johnny Mullins	2	0	0	0	1	0	1	0	4	0	0	0
5	DF	(England) Ian Sharps	17	0	1	0	1	0	1	0	20	0	3	0
2	DF	(England) Dale Tonge	6+1	0	0	0	0	0	0	0	6+1	0	0	0
18	DF	(England) Nicky Hunt	6+2	0	0	0	0	0	0	0	6+2	0	4	0
3	DF	(England) Laurie Wilson	5	0	0	0	1	0	1	0	7	0	0	0
14	DF	(Wales) Mark Bradley	7+3	0	1	1	1	0	1	0	10+3	1	1	0
11	MF	(England) Gareth Evans	9+3	2	0	0	1	0	1	0	11+3	2	3	0
8	MF	(England) Jason Taylor	8+3	0	0+1	0	0+1	0	1	0	9+5	1	1	0
	MF	(England) Nicky Walker	0+1	0	0	0	0	0	0	0	0+1	0	0	0
26	MF	(England) Danny Schofield	0	0	0	0	0	0	0	0	0	0	0	0
19	MF	(England) David Noble	5+1	0	0	0	1	0	0	0	6+1	0	0	0
15	MF	(England) Ben Pringle	17	4	1	0	1	0	0+1	0	19+1	4	3	0
24	MF	(England) Mitch Rose	1+1	0	0	0	0	0	0	0	1+1	0	0	0
7	MF	(England) Lionel Ainsworth	6+5	0	0	0	0+1	1	1	0	7+6	1	0	0
4	MF	(Iceland) Kári Árnason	11	1	0	0	1	0	0	0	12	1	3	0
10	MF	(Northern Ireland) Michael O'Connor	11+2	4	0+1	0	0	0	1	0	12+3	4	5	0
17	FW	(Wales) Daniel Nardiello	8+4	7	0	0	1	0	0+1	0	9+5	7	1	0
9	FW	(England) Alex Revell	9+4	3	1	0	0	0	1	0	11+4	3	0	1
25	FW	(England) Alec Denton	0+1	0	0	0	0	0	0	0	0+1	0	0	0
16	FW	(Nigeria) Kayode Odejayi	13+3	2	1	0	1	0	0	0	15+3	2	2	0
22	FW	(England) Kieran Agard	0+10	1	0+1	0	0+1	0	1	0	1+12	1	0	0
Players played for Rotherham this season on loan who returned to their parent club:
23	DF	(Scotland) Robert Harris	6	1	0	0	0	0	0	0	6	1	0	0
28	MF	(Republic of Ireland) Jamie Devitt	1	0	1	0	0	0	0	0	1	0	0	0
Players on loan at Rotherham:
23	DF	(England) Josh Morris	4	0	1	0	0	0	0	0	5	0	0	0
27	MF	(Republic of Ireland) Lee Frecklington	6	2	1	2	0	0	0	0	7	4	2	0
31	MF	(England) Courtney Cameron	1	0	0	0	0	0	0	0	1	0	0	0

Key

- x+x
- Starts plus substitute appearances

=== Top scorers ===
As of 3 November 2012

Place	Position	Nation	Name	League Two	FA Cup	League Cup	FL Trophy	Total
1	FW	(Wales)	Daniel Nardiello	7	0	0	0	7
2	MF	(Northern Ireland)	Michael O'Connor	4	0	0	0	4
=	MF	(England)	Ben Pringle	4	0	0	0	4
=	MF	(Republic of Ireland)	Lee Frecklington	2	2	0	0	4
=	FW	(England)	Alex Revell	3	0	0	0	3
4	FW	(Nigeria)	Kayode Odejayi	2	0	0	0	2
=	MF	(England)	Gareth Evans	2	0	0	0	2
5	MF	(England)	Lionel Ainsworth	0	0	1	0	1
=	MF	(England)	Jason Taylor	1	0	0	0	1
=	DF	(Scotland)	Robert Harris	1	0	0	0	1
=	FW	(England)	Kieran Agard	1	0	0	0	1
=	DF	(Wales)	Mark Bradley	0	1	0	0	1
=	MF	(Iceland)	Kari Arnason	1	0	0	0	1
			TOTALS	28	3	1	0	32

== Transfers ==
As of 29 October 2012

Players transferred in
Date	Pos.	Nat.	Name	Previous club	Fee	Ref.
10 May 2012	FW	(Wales)	Daniel Nardiello	Exeter City F.C.	Free	
15 May 2012	FW	(Nigeria)	Kayode Odejayi	Colchester United	Undisclosed	
22 May 2012	DF	(England)	Ian Sharps	Shrewsbury Town	Free	
22 May 2012	DF	(England)	Nicky Hunt	Preston North End	Free	
24 May 2012	GK	(Scotland)	Scott Shearer	Crawley Town	Free	
30 May 2012	DF	(Northern Ireland)	Michael O'Connor	Scunthorpe United	Free	
7 June 2012	MF	(Iceland)	Kári Árnason	Aberdeen	Free	
18 June 2012	MF	(England)	Lionel Ainsworth	Shrewsbury Town	Free	
20 June 2012	DF	(England)	Lawrie Wilson	Morecambe	Free	
13 July 2012	MF	(England)	David Noble	Exeter City	Free	
27 July 2012	FW	(England)	Kieran Agard	Yeovil Town	Free	
7 September 2012	DF	(Wales)	Craig Morgan	Preston North End	Free	
2 January 2013	MF	(Republic of Ireland)	Lee Frecklington	Peterborough United	Undisclosed	
Players transferred out
Date	Pos.	Nat.	Name	To	Fee	Ref.
1 May 2012	DF	(England)	Richard Naylor	Released	Free	
4 May 2012	DF	(England)	Luke Foster	Released	Free	
7 May 2012	MF	(England)	Danny Harrison	Released	Free	
7 May 2012	DF	(England)	Tom Newey	Released	Free	
7 May 2012	MF	(England)	Ollie Banks	Released	Free	
7 May 2012	MF	(England)	Marchus Marshall	Released	Free	
7 May 2012	FW	(England)	Paul Warne	Coaching Staff	Retired	
7 May 2012	GK	(England)	Rhys Taylor	Chelsea	Returned	
7 May 2012	DF	(England)	Sam Wood	Brentford	Returned	
7 May 2012	MF	(England)	Kieron Cadogan	Crystal Palace	Returned	
7 May 2012	FW	(England)	Sam Hoskins	Southampton	Returned	
7 May 2012	DF	(England)	Scott Griffiths	Peterborough United	Returned	
23 May 2012	DF	(England)	Michael Raynes	Mutual Consent	Free	
1 June 2012	FW	(England)	Lewis Grabban	AFC Bournemouth	£300,000	
3 July 2012	DF	(England)	Ryan Cresswell	Southend United	Free	
13 July 2012	GK	(England)	Jamie Annerson	Mutual Consent	Free	
Players loaned in
Date from	Pos.	Nat	Name	From	Date to	Ref.
27 September 2012	DF	(Scotland)	Robert Harris	Blackpool	25 October 2012	
19 October 2012	MF	(Republic of Ireland)	Lee Frecklington	Peterborough United	1 Month	
25 October 2012	DF	(England)	Josh Morris	Blackburn Rovers	1 Month	
1 November 2012	MF	(Republic of Ireland)	Jamie Devitt	Hull City	8 November 2012 (Injury)	
9 November 2012	MF	(England)	Luke Rooney	Swindon Town	1 Month	
16 November 2012	MF	(England)	Courtney Cameron	Aston Villa F.C. Reserves and Academy	5 January 2013	
Players loaned out
Date from	Pos.	Nat	Name	To	Date to	Ref.
12 September 2012	MF	(England)	Danny Schofield	Accrington Stanley	3 Months	
5 October 2012	DF	(England)	Johnny Mullins	Oxford United	3 Months	

== Competitions ==
=== Classification ===
Pos	Team	Pld	W	D	L	GF	GA	GD	Pts	Promotion, qualification or relegation
1	Gillingham (C, P)	46	23	14	9	66	39	+27	83	Promotion to Football League One
2	Rotherham United (P)	46	24	7	15	74	59	+15	79	Promotion to Football League One
3	Port Vale (P)	46	21	15	10	87	52	+35	78	Promotion to Football League One
4	Burton Albion	46	22	10	14	71	65	+6	76	Qualification for League Two play-offs (Note: Four teams play for one spot and promotion to Football League One.)
5	Cheltenham Town	46	20	15	11	58	51	+7	75	Qualification for League Two play-offs

Updated to match(es) played on 27 April 2013. Source: BBC Sport
Rules for classification: 1) Points; 2) Goal difference; 3) Number of goals scored
(C) Champions; (P) Promoted

== Coverage ==
Throughout the season, Rotherham will feature on many highlight shows. BBC's Football League Show will show highlights of every Football League game played on a Saturday, sometimes doing special segments-in which The Millers featured in when they beat Burton Albion 3–0 on the first day of the season. A weekly post-match program on Sky Sports News, called Goals Express, also shows goals from the matches. Local radio station BBC Radio Sheffield sometimes do commentary, and 6 days a week hold the Football Heaven phone in, and after matches fans are able to call and express their opinions. Rotherham may be on Sky Sports sometimes, and if the club were to progress far in a domestic cup then they may have matches on BBC or ITV. Millers Player also host commentary and match stats during games, for under 10p a day the buyer is treated to exclusive information that can only be seen via the player.
