= List of Eastbourne Borough F.C. seasons =

This is a list of English football seasons played by Langney Sports (1983 until 2001) and Eastbourne Borough Football Club from 2001 to the present day. Their early years (1964–1983) which were spent playing amateur and intermediate football are not included.

Eastbourne Borough Football Club is an English association football club based in Langney, Eastbourne. The club was founded in 1964 as Langney F.C and joined Division Two of the Eastbourne & District Football League. In 1968, the club changed its name to Langney Sports F.C. which is reflected in the club's nickname "The Sports". They spent their early years playing in the Eastbourne & District Football League and the Eastbourne & Hastings League, before becoming a founding member of the Sussex County League Division Three in 1983. The club moved to Priory Lane in the same year and was renamed Eastbourne Borough F.C. in 2001.

The years 1983–2000 were spent in the County League, before the club climbed the football pyramid under Garry Wilson reaching the Conference National in the space of nine seasons. They were relegated back to the Conference South in 2011. The club has won the Sussex Senior Cup three times, has reached the FA Cup first round on five occasions and the FA Trophy third round on six occasions.

Season	∆	League										FA Cup	FA Trophy	FA Vase	Other competitions	Average home attendance	Top scorer		References
Season	∆	Division	P	W	D	L	F	A	GD	Pts	Pos	FA Cup	FA Trophy	FA Vase	Other competitions	Average home attendance	Top scorer		References
1983	Joined Joined Sussex County League as founder members of new Division Three (as Langney Sports F.C.)																		
1983–84	10	SC3	24	10	8	6	43	36	+7	38	5th						n/a		
1984–85	10	SC3	28	12	6	10	52	41	+11	42	5th						n/a		
1985–86	10	SC3	28	14	4	10	53	39	+14	46	4th						n/a		
1986–87	10	SC3	26	21	3	2	101	19	+82	66	1st						n/a		
1987	Promoted to Sussex County League Division Two																		
1987–88	9	SC2	28	20	6	2	65	19	+46	66	1st						n/a		
1988	Promoted to Sussex County League Division One																		
1988–89	8	SC1	34	12	13	9	54	46	+8	49	10th			PR			n/a		
1989–90	8	SC1	34	20	6	8	63	33	+30	66	3rd			PR			n/a		
1990–91	8	SC1	34	23	5	6	89	42	+47	74	3rd	1QR		2R			n/a		
1991–92	8	SC1	34	22	10	2	96	36	+60	76	2nd	PR		2R	SSC Runners-up		Nigel Hole	?	
1992–93	8	SC1	34	20	5	9	77	42	+35	65	4th	2QR		PR			n/a		
1993–94	8	SC1	38	22	7	9	84	59	+25	73	3rd	1QR		PR			n/a		
1994–95	8	SC1	38	13	11	14	61	58	+3	50	11th	PR		1R			n/a		
1995–96	8	SC1	38	17	9	12	70	52	+18	60	9th	1QR		2QR			n/a		
1996–97	8	SC1	38	16	10	12	72	56	+16	58	6th	PR		1R			n/a		
1997–98	8	SC1	38	23	5	10	76	46	+30	74	4th	3QR		2R			n/a		
1998–99	8	SC1	38	20	6	12	69	43	+26	66	4th	4QR		2QR			n/a		
1999–00	8	SC1	38	31	6	1	101	25	+76	99	1st	3QR		1QR			John Snelgrove	33	
2000	Promoted to Southern Football League Eastern Division																		
2000–01	7	SLE	42	19	8	15	75	55	+20	65	9th	2QR	1R				Matt Allen	17	
2001	Langney Sports F.C. renamed to Eastbourne Borough F.C.																		
2001–02	7	SLE	42	21	6	15	63	46	+17	69	7th	2QR	3R		SSC Winners	382	Matt Allen	25	
2002–03	7	SLE	42	29	6	7	92	33	+59	93	2nd	3QR	3R		SSC Runners-up	534	Scott Ramsay	38	
2003	Promoted to Southern Football League Premier Division																		
2003–04	6	SLP	42	14	13	15	48	56	-8	55	11th	4QR	1R			597	Scott Ramsay	28	
2004	Joined newly formed Conference South																		
2004–05	6	Conf South	42	18	10	14	65	47	+18	64	5th	2QR	3R			719	Scott Ramsay	23	
2005–06	6	Conf South	42	10	16	16	51	61	-10	46	17th	1R	3QR			603	Scott Ramsay	14	
2006–07	6	Conf South	42	18	15	9	58	42	+16	69	7th	2QR	3QR			683	Scott Ramsay	16	
2007–08	6	Conf South	42	23	11	8	83	38	+45	80	2nd	1R	3QR			872	Andy Atkin	29	
2008	Promoted to Conference National																		
2008–09	5	Conf Nat	46	18	6	22	58	70	-12	60	13th	1R	1R		SSC Winners	1,344	Andy Atkin	15	
2009–10	5	Conf Nat	44	11	13	20	42	72	-30	46	19th	4QR	2R			1,206	Jamie Taylor	17	
2010–11	5	Conf Nat	46	10	9	27	62	104	-42	39	23rd	4QR	3R		SSC Runners-up	1,105	Jamie Taylor	19	
2011	Relegated to Conference South																		
2011–12	6	Conf South	42	12	9	21	54	69	-15	45	18th	4QR	3QR			695^{a}	Ben Watson	14	
2012–13	6	Conf South	42	14	9	19	42	52	-10	51	12th	3QR	3QR			533	Elliott Charles	14	
2013–14	6	Conf South	42	16	10	16	55	59	-4	58	10th	3QR	3QR			545	Simon Johnson	10	
2014–15	6	Conf South	40	14	13	13	51	50	+1	55	11th	4QR	3QR			574	Gavin McCallum	11	
2015	Football Conference is renamed National League																		
2015–16	6	NLS	42	13	11	18	60	63	-3	50	17th	4QR	2R		SSC Winners	533	Nathaniel Pinney	26	
2016–17	6	NLS	42	16	10	16	82	70	+12	58	11th	1R	3QR			541	Nathaniel Pinney	25	
2017–18	6	NLS	42	13	7	22	57	80	-23	46	18th	3QR	1R			517	Jamie Taylor	14	
2018–19	6	NLS	42	10	12	20	52	65	-13	42	18th	4QR	1R			586	Charlie Walker/ Dean Cox	12	
2019–20	6	NLS	33	8	14	11	38	54	-16	38	18th	3QR	1R			546	Charlie Walker	12	
2020–21	6	NLS	19	9	6	4	36	26	+10	33	3rd	1R	2R			499^{b}	Chris Whelpdale	15	
2021–22	6	NLS	40	17	9	14	73	67	+6	60	6th	3QR	3R			968	Charley Kendall	27	
2022–23	6	NLS	46	22	5	19	74	66	+8	71	8th	4QR	3R			1,052	Shiloh Remy	15	
2023–24	6	NLS	46	14	10	22	53	74	-21	52	19th	2QR	2R			1,381	Fletcher Holman	10	
2024–25	6	NLS	46	25	13	8	70	43	+27	88	3rd	2QR	3R			1,306	George Alexander	27	
2025–26	6	NLS	46	9	9	28	59	90	-31	36	24th	4QR	2R			959	Pemi Aderoju	20	
2026	Relegated to Isthmian League Premier Division																		

== Key ==
Winners	Runners up	Play-offs	Promoted	Relegated

Key to league record
P - games played
W - games won
D - games drawn
L - games lost
F - goals for
A - goals against
Pts - points
Pos - final position

Key to rounds
1QR - first qualifying round
2QR - second qualifying round, etc.
PR - preliminary round
1R - first round
2R - second round, etc.
QF - quarter-final
SF - semi-final

Key to divisions
Conf Nat - Conference
Conf South - Conference South
NLS - National League South
SC1 - Sussex County League Division One
SC2 - Sussex County League Division Two
SC3 - Sussex County League Division Three
SLP - Southern League Premier Division
SLE - Southern League Eastern Division

Key to cups
SSC - Sussex Senior Cup

^{a}Stats websites list incorrect attendance figure of 214 for game played between Eastbourne and Chelmsford on 29 August 2011. Correct attendance was 783. Taking this into account, the average attendance for the season was 695.
^{b}Based off the only game of the season that fans were allowed to attend (v Dartford) due to the COVID-19 pandemic.

Sources for League, FA Cup and FA Trophy statistics:

- Langney Sports at the Football Club History Database
- Eastbourne Borough at the Football Club History Database
