= Scott Ramsay =

Scott Ramsay may refer to:

- Scott Ramsay (tenor), American operatic tenor
- Scott Ramsay (footballer) (born 1980), English footballer
- Scott McKenna Ramsay (born 1975), Scottish footballer
- Scott Ramsay (curler) in 2012 DEKALB Superspiel

== See also ==
- Scott Ramsey (disambiguation)
