= 2012–13 FA Cup =

Association football season

The Football Association Challenge Cup
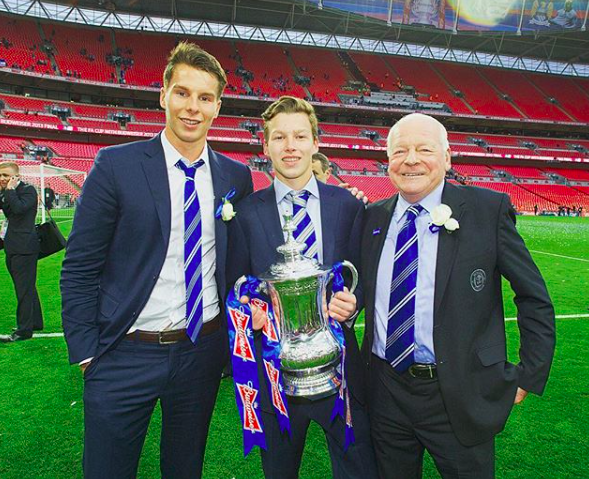
- Members of the Wigan Athletic executive with the FA Cup trophy

Tournament details
- Country: England; Wales
- Dates: 11 August 2012 – 11 May 2013
- Teams: 758

Final positions
- Champions: Wigan Athletic (1st title)
- Runners-up: Manchester City

Tournament statistics
- Matches played: 156
- Attendance: 2,015,202 (12,918 per match)
- Top goal scorer: Danny Hylton (8 goals)

The 2012–13 FA Cup (known as the FA Cup with Budweiser for sponsorship reasons) was the 132nd season of the FA Cup, the main domestic cup competition in English football, and the oldest football knock-out competition in the world.

A total of 833 clubs applied to enter, with 758 clubs being accepted into the competition. The preliminary rounds commenced on 11 August 2012, with the first round proper played on 3 November 2012. The final was played on 11 May 2013 at Wembley Stadium in London between Manchester City and Wigan Athletic. In what was described as the biggest upset since Wimbledon's win over Liverpool in the 1988 final, Wigan defeated Manchester City 1–0 to claim the trophy for the first time in their history.

As a result, Wigan Athletic participated in the group stage of the following season's UEFA Europa League. Chelsea were the defending champions, having beaten Liverpool 2–1 in last season's final, but were eliminated in the semi-finals by Manchester City.

Three days after winning the cup, Wigan made history by becoming the first side to win the cup and be relegated in the same season, after they lost 4–1 to Arsenal.

== Teams ==
Round	Clubs remaining	Clubs involved	Winners from previous round	New entries this round	Leagues entering at this round
First round	124	80	32	48	EFL League One; EFL League Two
Second round	84	40	40	none	none
Third round	64	64	20	44	Premier League; EFL Championship
Fourth round	32	32	32	none	none
Fifth round	16	16	16	none	none
Quarter-finals	8	8	8	none	none
Semi-finals	4	4	4	none	none
Final	2	2	2	none	none

== Schedule ==
The schedule for the 2012–13 FA Cup, as announced by the Football Association, is as follows:

Round	Main date	Number of fixtures	Clubs	New entries this round	Prize money
Extra preliminary round	11 August 2012	200	758 → 558	400: 359th–758th	£1,000
Preliminary round	25 August 2012	166	558 → 392	132: 227th–358th	£1,750
First round qualifying	8 September 2012	116	392 → 276	66: 161st–226th	£3,000
Second round qualifying	22 September 2012	80	276 → 196	44: 117th–160th	£4,500
Third round qualifying	6 October 2012	40	196 → 156	none	£7,500
Fourth round qualifying	20 October 2012	32	156 → 124	24: 93rd–116th	£12,500
First round proper	3 November 2012	40	124 → 84	48: 45th–92nd	£18,000
Second round proper	1 December 2012	20	84 → 64	none	£27,000
Third round proper	5 January 2013	32	64 → 32	44: 1st–44th	£67,500
Fourth round proper	26 January 2013	16	32 → 16	none	£90,000
Fifth round proper	16 February 2013	8	16 → 8	none	£180,000
Sixth round proper	9–10 March 2013	4	8 → 4	none	£360,000
Semi-finals	13–14 April 2013	2	4 → 2	none	£900,000
Final	11 May 2013	1	2 → 1	none	Runner-up £900,000; Winner £1,800,000

== Qualifying rounds ==
All teams that entered the competition, but were not members of the Premier League or The Football League, competed in the qualifying rounds to secure one of 32 places available in the first round proper.

The winners from the fourth qualifying round were Alfreton Town, Harrogate Town, Barrow, Guiseley, Hereford United, Kidderminster Harriers, Bradford Park Avenue, Wrexham, AFC Fylde, Lincoln City, Macclesfield Town, Altrincham, Stockport County, Nuneaton Town, Mansfield Town, Arlesey Town, Forest Green Rovers, Metropolitan Police, Yate Town, Slough Town, Hastings United, Bromley, Chelmsford City, Luton Town, Boreham Wood, Cambridge City, Dorchester Town, Bishop's Stortford, Gloucester City, Hendon, Ebbsfleet United and Braintree Town.

AFC Fylde and Yate Town were appearing in the competition proper for the first time. Of the others, Slough Town had last featured in the first round in 2004–05, Boreham Wood had last done so in 2003-04, Hastings United had last done so in 2002-03, Metropolitan Police in 1993-94 and Gloucester City in 1989-90.

== First round proper ==
Teams from League One and League Two entered at this stage, along with the winners from the fourth round qualifying.

The draw was made on 21 October 2012 with ties to be played on 2–4 November 2012. Yate Town and Slough Town were the lowest-ranked teams left in the competition, both competing in level 8 of the English football league system.

2 November 2012	Cambridge City (7)	0–0	Milton Keynes Dons (3)	City Ground, Cambridge
19:30		Report		Attendance: 1,564; Referee: James Adcock

13 November 2012 Replay	Milton Keynes Dons (3)	6–1	Cambridge City (7)	Stadium mk, Milton Keynes
19:45	Williams 12', 74' (pen.); O'Shea 43'; Bowditch 45+2'; Alli 75'; Chicksen 77'	Report	Theobald 60'	Attendance: 4,126; Referee: Nigel Miller

3 November 2012	Hereford United (5)	3–1	Shrewsbury Town (3)	Edgar Street, Hereford
13:00	Evans 3'; Bowman 12', 73' (pen.)	Report	Summerfield 30'	Attendance: 3,251; Referee: Gary Sutton

3 November 2012	Boreham Wood (6)	0–2	Brentford (3)	Meadow Park, Borehamwood
14:00		Report	Donaldson 16'; Forrester 44'	Attendance: 1,495; Referee: Robert Lewis

3 November 2012	Kidderminster Harriers (5)	0–2	Oldham Athletic (3)	Aggborough, Kidderminster
15:01		Report	Montaño 52'; Baxter 65'	Attendance: 2,888; Referee: David Webb

3 November 2012	Chelmsford City (6)	3–1	Colchester United (3)	Melbourne Stadium, Chelmsford
15:00	Simmonds 23', 63'; Slabber 89'	Report	Rose 70'	Attendance: 3,016; Referee: Michael Naylor

3 November 2012	Metropolitan Police (7)	1–2	Crawley Town (3)	Imber Court, Molesey
15:00	Tait 83'	Report	Simpson 36'; Clarke 69'	Attendance: 1,485; Referee: Trevor Kettle

3 November 2012	Luton Town (5)	1–1	Nuneaton Town (5)	Kenilworth Road, Luton
15:00	Rendell 84'	Report	Waite 20'	Attendance: 3,089; Referee: Robert Whitton

13 November 2012 Replay	Nuneaton Town (5)	0–2	Luton Town (5)	Triton Showers Community Arena, Nuneaton
19:45		Report	Rendell 22', 72' (pen.)	Attendance: 1,596; Referee: Gavin Ward

3 November 2012	Portsmouth (3)	0–2	Notts County (3)	Fratton Park, Portsmouth
15:00		Report	Zoko 45+1'; Arquin 56'	Attendance: 7,560; Referee: Darren Sheldrake

3 November 2012	Bishop's Stortford (6)	1–2	Hastings United (7)	Woodside Park, Bishop's Stortford
15:00	Johnson 7'	Report	Ray 70'; Attwood 88'	Attendance: 1,212; Referee: Hiroyuki Kimura

3 November 2012	Fleetwood Town (4)	3–0	Bromley (6)	Highbury Stadium, Fleetwood
15:00	Ball 11'; Parkin 17' (pen.), 43' (pen.)	Report		Attendance: 1,696; Referee: Ross Joyce

3 November 2012	Forest Green Rovers (5)	2–3	Port Vale (4)	The New Lawn, Nailsworth
15:00	Norwood 34'; Oshodi 49'	Report	Vincent 7'; McDonald 12'; Williamson 80'	Attendance: 1,753; Referee: Philip Gibbs

3 November 2012	Torquay United (4)	0–1	Harrogate Town (6)	Plainmoor, Torquay
15:00		Report	Chilaka 20'	Attendance: 1,817; Referee: Wayne Barratt

3 November 2012	AFC Bournemouth (3)	4–0	Dagenham & Redbridge (4)	Dean Court, Bournemouth
15:00	McQuoid 30', 79'; Pugh 59'; Fogden 90+1'	Report		Attendance: 5,827; Referee: Darren Deadman

3 November 2012	Morecambe (4)	1–1	Rochdale (4)	Globe Arena, Morecambe
15:00	Fleming 12'	Report	Kennedy 72'	Attendance: 1,839; Referee: Stephen Martin

13 November 2012 Replay	Rochdale (4)	0–1	Morecambe (4)	Spotland, Rochdale
19:45		Report	McDonald 44'	Attendance: 1,675; Referee: Mark Heywood

3 November 2012	Swindon Town (3)	0–2	Macclesfield Town (5)	County Ground, Swindon
15:00		Report	Diagne 63'; Thompson 90' (o.g.)	Attendance: 6,408; Referee: Andy Davies

3 November 2012	Cheltenham Town (4)	3–0	Yate Town (8)	Whaddon Road, Cheltenham
15:00	Thomas 3' (o.g.); Mohamed 65'; Zebroski 90+2'	Report		Attendance: 3,055; Referee: David Phillips

3 November 2012	Coventry City (3)	3–0	Arlesey Town (7)	Ricoh Arena, Coventry
15:00	Ball 28'; Christie 63'; Jennings 89'	Report		Attendance: 6,594; Referee: Kevin Wright

3 November 2012	York City (4)	1–1	AFC Wimbledon (4)	Bootham Crescent, York
15:00	Reed 62'	Report	Strutton 80'	Attendance: 2,752; Referee: Richard Clark

12 November 2012 Replay	AFC Wimbledon (4)	4–3 (a.e.t.)	York City (4)	Kingsmeadow, Kingston upon Thames
19:45	Strutton 34', 78'; Harrison 97'; Midson 99'	Report	Brown 22' (o.g.); Reed 90', 119'	Attendance: 1,954; Referee: Keith Stroud

3 November 2012	Bury (3)	1–0	Exeter City (4)	Gigg Lane, Bury
15:00	Sodje 35'	Report		Attendance: 1,821; Referee: Tony Harrington

3 November 2012	Chesterfield (4)	6–1	Hartlepool United (3)	Proact Stadium, Chesterfield
15:00	Boden 16'; Randall 29'; Clay 42'; Forbes 54'; Lester 79'; Westcarr 90'	Report	Sweeney 78'	Attendance: 3,083; Referee: Christopher Sarginson

3 November 2012	Doncaster Rovers (3)	3–1	Bradford Park Avenue (6)	Keepmoat Stadium, Doncaster
15:00	M. Woods 27'; Hume 36'; Brown 76'	Report	Marshall 56'	Attendance: 4,602; Referee: Jeremy Simpson

3 November 2012	Gillingham (4)	4–0	Scunthorpe United (3)	Priestfield Stadium, Gillingham
15:00	Fish 59'; Burton 65'; Kedwell 76' (pen.); Birchall 90+3'	Report		Attendance: 4,017; Referee: Andy Woolmer

3 November 2012	Aldershot Town (4)	2–1	Hendon (7)	Recreation Ground, Aldershot
15:00	Hylton 57', 85'	Report	Cracknell 28'	Attendance: 1,822; Referee: Simon Hooper

3 November 2012	Lincoln City (5)	1–1	Walsall (3)	The 12th Man Sincil Bank Stadium, Lincoln
15:00	Taylor 45+1'	Report	Bowerman 87'	Attendance: 2,032; Referee: Scott Duncan

13 November 2012 Replay	Walsall (3)	2–3 (a.e.t.)	Lincoln City (5)	Banks's Stadium, Walsall
19:45	Taundry 81'; Paterson 120+2'	Report	Power 50'; Oliver 102', 118'	Attendance: 1,762; Referee: Graham Scott

3 November 2012	Wrexham (5)	2–4	Alfreton Town (5)	Racecourse Ground, Wrexham
15:00	Ashton 2' (pen.); Wright 85'	Report	Clayton 27'; Bradley 60' (pen.); Tomlinson 79', 90+2'	Attendance: 2,409; Referee: Nicholas Kinseley

3 November 2012	Southend United (4)	3–0	Stockport County (5)	Roots Hall, Southend-on-Sea
15:00	Corr 33'; Laird 85'; Eastwood 88'	Report		Attendance: 3,084; Referee: Iain Williamson

3 November 2012	Crewe Alexandra (3)	4–1	Wycombe Wanderers (4)	Alexandra Stadium, Crewe
15:00	Pogba 19'; Ellis 40'; Aneke 62'; Murphy 77'	Report	Spring 13'	Attendance: 2,417; Referee: Andrew Madley

3 November 2012	Bristol Rovers (4)	1–2	Sheffield United (3)	Memorial Stadium, Bristol
15:00	Clarkson 5'	Report	Blackman 53'; Porter 62'	Attendance: 4,712; Referee: Fred Graham

3 November 2012	Mansfield Town (5)	0–0	Slough Town (8)	One Call Stadium, Mansfield
15:00		Report		Attendance: 1,686; Referee: Jumpei Lida

13 November 2012 Replay	Slough Town (8)	1–1 (a.e.t.) (1–4 p)	Mansfield Town (5)	Holloways Park, Beaconsfield
19:45	Bowden-Haase 66'	Report	Woozley 45+2' (o.g.)	Attendance: 1,593; Referee: Andy D'Urso
	Penalties
	Swift (penalty scored); Burgess (penalty missed); Sonner (penalty missed)		(penalty scored) Clements; (penalty scored) Briscoe; (penalty scored) Rhead; (penalty scored) Speight

3 November 2012	Barnet (4)	0–2	Oxford United (4)	Underhill, London
15:00		Report	Constable 56'; Rigg 80'	Attendance: 2,346; Referee: Tim Robinson

3 November 2012	Rotherham United (4)	3–2	Stevenage (3)	New York Stadium, Rotherham
15:00	Bradley 30'; Frecklington 53', 56'	Report	Dunne 58'; Morais 72'	Attendance: 4,324; Referee: Eddie Ilderton

3 November 2012	AFC Fylde (7)	1–4	Accrington Stanley (4)	Kellamergh Park, Warton
15:00	Farrell 90'	Report	Hatfield 32', 45', 77', 86'	Attendance: 1,213; Referee: David Coote

3 November 2012	Guiseley (6)	2–2	Barrow (5)	Nethermoor Park, Guiseley
15:00	Brooksby 14'; Boshell 35'	Report	Boyes 44'; Hunter 48'	Attendance: 1,605; Referee: Sebastian Stockbridge

13 November 2012 Replay	Barrow (5)	1–0	Guiseley (6)	Furness Building Society Stadium, Barrow
19:45	Hunter 90+2'	Report		Attendance: 1,402; Referee: Oliver Langford

3 November 2012	Northampton Town (4)	1–1	Bradford City (4)	Sixfields, Northampton
15:00	Moult 61'	Report	Atkinson 32'	Attendance: 2,512; Referee: Geoff Eltringham

13 November 2012 Replay	Bradford City (4)	3–3 (a.e.t.) (4–2 p)	Northampton Town (4)	Valley Parade, Bradford
19:45	Atkinson 35'; Wells 90' (pen.); McHugh 120+1'	Report	Demontagnac 43' (pen.); Platt 90+3'; Langmead 109'	Attendance: 2,951; Referee: Mick Russell
	Penalties
	G. Jones (penalty scored); Atkinson (penalty scored); Darby (penalty scored); Ravenhill (penalty scored)		(penalty scored) Platt; (penalty missed) East; (penalty missed) Langmead; (penalty scored) Hornby

3 November 2012	Preston North End (3)	3–0	Yeovil Town (3)	Deepdale, Preston
15:00	Byrom 38'; Amoo 41'; Robertson 70'	Report		Attendance: 4,757; Referee: Andy Haines

3 November 2012	Carlisle United (3)	4–2	Ebbsfleet United (5)	Brunton Park, Carlisle
15:00	Symington 45+1'; Noble 61'; Berrett 81'; Garner 87'	Report	Elder 58'; Howe 90+3'	Attendance: 2,373; Referee: Darren Bond

4 November 2012	Burton Albion (4)	3–3	Altrincham (6)	Pirelli Stadium, Burton upon Trent
15:00	Diamond 53'; Maghoma 77'; Zola 90+3'	Report	Rodgers 29'; Stanton 34' (o.g.); McCrory 85' (o.g.)	Attendance: 1,989; Referee: Michael Bull

15 November 2012 Replay	Altrincham (6)	0–2	Burton Albion (4)	Moss Lane, Altrincham
19:45		Report	Palmer 65'; Zola 75'	Attendance: 2,428; Referee: Carl Boyeson

4 November 2012	Dorchester Town (6)	1–0	Plymouth Argyle (4)	The Avenue Stadium, Dorchester
16:30	Gosling 49'	Report		Attendance: 3,196; Referee: Lee Collins

13 November 2012	Braintree Town (5)	0–3	Tranmere Rovers (3)	Cressing Road, Braintree
19:45		Report	Thompson 24'; Stockton 53'; Power 90'	Attendance: 1,503; Referee: Dean Whitestone

14 November 2012	Gloucester City (6)	0–2	Leyton Orient (3)	Whaddon Road, Cheltenham
19:45		Report	Mooney 87'; Cox 88'	Attendance: 1,381; Referee: Steven Rushton

== Second round proper ==
The draw for this round was made on 4 November 2012 with the ties played on the weekend of 1–2 December 2012.

Hastings United, from the seventh tier of English football, were the lowest-ranked team in the second round proper.

Bradford City accidentally fielded Curtis Good, who was ineligible to play, in a 1–1 draw against Brentford. The team was initially disqualified, and Brentford declared the winners by walkover, but Bradford eventually made a successful appeal to the FA against expulsion and were fined £1,000 instead allowing the replay to go ahead. Brentford would eventually dump Bradford City out of the cup after winning that replay.

30 November 2012	Bradford City (4)	1–1	Brentford (3)	Valley Parade, Bradford
19:45	Hanson 70'	Report	Donaldson 43'	Attendance: 3,620; Referee: Gary Sutton

18 December 2012 Replay	Brentford (3)	4–2 (a.e.t.)	Bradford City (4)	Griffin Park, Brentford
19:45	Trotta 45' (pen.), 102'; Donaldson 103'; Forrester 106'	Report	Reid 34'; Connell 94' (pen.)	Attendance: 2,643; Referee: Graham Scott

1 December 2012	Preston North End (3)	2–0	Gillingham (4)	Deepdale, Preston
15:00	Monakana 12'; Beavon 38'	Report		Attendance: 5,271; Referee: Trevor Kettle

1 December 2012	Bury (3)	1–1	Southend United (4)	Gigg Lane, Bury
15:00	Doherty 33' (pen.)	Report	Tomlin 41'	Attendance: 2,391; Referee: Andy Haines

11 December 2012 Replay	Southend United (4)	1–1 (a.e.t.) (3–2 p)	Bury (3)	Roots Hall, Southend-on-Sea
19:45	Tomlin 63'	Report	Thompson 59'	Attendance: 3,043; Referee: Oliver Langford
	Penalties
	Eastwood (penalty scored); Clohessy (penalty scored); Hurst (penalty scored); Tomlin (penalty missed)		(penalty scored) Schumacher; (penalty scored) Doherty; (penalty missed) Worrall; (penalty missed) Hewitt; (penalty missed) Hughes

1 December 2012	Sheffield United (3)	2–1	Port Vale (4)	Bramall Lane, Sheffield
15:00	Miller 90', 90+5'	Report	Pope 33'	Attendance: 10,215; Referee: Kevin Wright

1 December 2012	Carlisle United (3)	1–3	AFC Bournemouth (3)	Brunton Park, Carlisle
15:00	Beck 72'	Report	Fogden 30'; O'Kane 36'; Pugh 90'	Attendance: 2,980; Referee: Paul Tierney

1 December 2012	Crewe Alexandra (3)	0–1	Burton Albion (4)	Alexandra Stadium, Crewe
15:00		Report	Zola 5'	Attendance: 3,065; Referee: Graham Salisbury

1 December 2012	Luton Town (5)	2–1	Dorchester Town (6)	Kenilworth Road, Luton
15:00	Gray 30'; Lawless 68'	Report	Pugh 71'	Attendance: 3,287; Referee: Carl Berry

1 December 2012	Oldham Athletic (3)	3–1	Doncaster Rovers (3)	Boundary Park, Oldham
15:00	Wabara 45'; Derbyshire 70', 77'	Report	Blake 4'	Attendance: 2,783; Referee: Nigel Miller

1 December 2012	Tranmere Rovers (3)	2–1	Chesterfield (4)	Prenton Park, Birkenhead
15:00	Stockton 42'; McGurk 57'	Report	Cooper 31'	Attendance: 3,781; Referee: Robert Madley

1 December 2012	Rotherham United (4)	1–1	Notts County (3)	New York Stadium, Rotherham
15:00	Pringle 42'	Report	Arquin 32'	Attendance: 7,903; Referee: Darren Drysdale

18 December 2012 Replay	Notts County (3)	0–3	Rotherham United (4)	Meadow Lane, Nottingham
19:45		Report	Pringle 9'; Bradley 22'; Nardiello 41'	Attendance: 2,990; Referee: Darren Deadman

18 December 2012	Barrow (5)	1–1	Macclesfield Town (5)	Holker Street, Barrow-in-Furness
19:45	Baker 29'	Report	Charnock 19'	Attendance: 1,592; Referee: David Webb

29 December 2012 Replay	Macclesfield Town (5)	4–1	Barrow (5)	Moss Rose, Macclesfield
15:00	Kissock 7'; Holroyd 16'; Barnes-Homer 67'; Holroyd 69'	Report	Boyes 17'	Attendance: 1554; Referee: Phil Gibbs

1 December 2012	Accrington Stanley (4)	3–3	Oxford United (4)	Crown Ground, Accrington
15:00	Lindfield 25'; Beattie 80'; Molyneux 90+1'	Report	Pittman 12'; Constable 86'; Raynes 90+4'	Attendance: 1,195; Referee: Andy Woolmer

18 December 2012 Replay	Oxford United (4)	2–0	Accrington Stanley (4)	Kassam Stadium, Oxford
19:45	Constable 66'; Leven 79'	Report		Attendance: 2,566; Referee: Simon Hooper

1 December 2012	Lincoln City (5)	3–3	Mansfield Town (5)	The 12th Man Sincil Bank Stadium, Lincoln
13:00	Power 45', 66'; Taylor 47'	Report	Green 21'; Briscoe 53'; Rhead 90+3'	Attendance: 4,127; Referee: Mark Haywood

12 December 2012 Replay	Mansfield Town (5)	2–1	Lincoln City (5)	One Call Stadium, Mansfield
19:45	Farman 14' (o.g.); Briscoe 77'	Report	Smith 41'	Attendance: 5,304; Referee: Darren Sheldrake

1 December 2012	Harrogate Town (6)	1–1	Hastings United (7)	Wetherby Road, Harrogate
13:00	Platt 41'	Report	Crellin 61'	Attendance: 2,986; Referee: Mark Brown

13 December 2012 Replay	Hastings United (7)	1–1 (a.e.t.) (5–4 p)	Harrogate Town (6)	The Pilot Field, Hastings
19:45	Carey 47' (pen.)	Report	Platt 89'	Attendance: 4,028; Referee: Mike Russell
	Penalties
	Dixon (penalty scored); Whitehead (penalty scored); Carey (penalty scored); Attwood (penalty scored); Ellis (penalty missed); Okojie (penalty scored)		(penalty scored) Bolder; (penalty missed) Platt; (penalty scored) Allan; (penalty scored) Hardy; (penalty scored) Dean; (penalty missed) Elam

1 December 2012	Coventry City (3)	2–1	Morecambe (4)	Ricoh Arena, Coventry
15:00	McSheffrey 38' (pen.); Baker 46'	Report	Ellison 77'	Attendance: 6,339; Referee: Carl Boyeson

1 December 2012	Crawley Town (3)	3–0	Chelmsford City (6)	Broadfield Stadium, Crawley
15:00	Adams 23'; Clarke 41'; Alexander 89' (pen.)	Report		Attendance: 3,012; Referee: Chris Sarginson

1 December 2012	Fleetwood Town (4)	2–3	Aldershot Town (4)	Highbury Stadium, Fleetwood
15:00	Brown 11'; Ball 88'	Report	Hylton 19', 75'; Vincenti 45+1'	Attendance: 1,757; Referee: Phil Gibbs

2 December 2012	Milton Keynes Dons (3)	2–1	AFC Wimbledon (4)	Stadium mk, Milton Keynes
12:30	Gleeson 45'; Otsemobor 90+1'	Report	Midson 59'	Attendance: 16,459; Referee: Scott Mathieson

2 December 2012	Alfreton Town (5)	2–4	Leyton Orient (3)	North Street, Alfreton
15:15	Paul Clayton 4'; Tomlinson 52'	Report	Cox 25', 86'; Mooney 30', 36'	Attendance: 1,104; Referee: Robert Madley

3 December 2012	Cheltenham Town (4)	1–1	Hereford United (5)	Whaddon Road, Cheltenham
19:45	Harrad 16'	Report	O'Keefe 20'	Attendance: 5,070; Referee: Craig Pawson

11 December 2012 Replay	Hereford United (5)	1–2 (a.e.t.)	Cheltenham Town (4)	Edgar Street, Hereford
19:45	Clucas 74'	Report	Harrad 45+3' (pen.); Mohamed 114'	Attendance: 5,026; Referee: Dean Whitestone

== Third round proper ==
Teams from the Premier League and Football League Championship entered at this stage, along with the winners from the second round.

The draw for the third round was made on 2 December 2012, with the ties played on the weekend of 5–6 January 2013.

Luton Town's Alex Lawless won the player of the round award. The results were as follows:

1. Alex Lawless, Luton Town
2. Danny Hylton, Aldershot Town
3. Matthew Barnes-Homer, Macclesfield Town
4. Liam Bridcutt, Brighton & Hove Albion
5. Andrea Orlandi, Brighton & Hove Albion

Hastings United remained the lowest-ranked football team in the third round proper, competing in level 7 of the English football league system.

5 January 2013	Crystal Palace (2)	0–0	Stoke City (1)	Selhurst Park, Selhurst
15:00		Report		Attendance: 13,693; Referee: Neil Swarbrick

15 January 2013 Replay	Stoke City (1)	4–1 (a.e.t.)	Crystal Palace (2)	Britannia Stadium, Stoke-on-Trent
19:45	Jones 69'; Walters 95', 110'; Jerome 120'	Report	Murray 87' (pen.)	Attendance: 11,617; Referee: Anthony Taylor

5 January 2013	Brighton & Hove Albion (2)	2–0	Newcastle United (1)	Falmer Stadium, Falmer
12:30	Orlandi 33'; Hoskins 87'	Report		Attendance: 21,740; Referee: Lee Probert

5 January 2013	Tottenham Hotspur (1)	3–0	Coventry City (3)	White Hart Lane, Tottenham
15:00	Dempsey 14', 37'; Bale 33'	Report		Attendance: 35,766; Referee: Michael Naylor

5 January 2013	Wigan Athletic (1)	1–1	AFC Bournemouth (3)	DW Stadium, Wigan
15:00	Gómez 70'	Report	O'Kane 41'	Attendance: 8,199; Referee: Robert Madley

15 January 2013 Replay	AFC Bournemouth (3)	0–1	Wigan Athletic (1)	Dean Court, Bournemouth
19:45		Report	Boselli 18'	Attendance: 8,890; Referee: Jon Moss

5 January 2013	Fulham (1)	1–1	Blackpool (2)	Craven Cottage, Fulham
15:00	Karagounis 80'	Report	Sylvestre 60'	Attendance: 14,473; Referee: Lee Mason

15 January 2013 Replay	Blackpool (2)	1–2 (a.e.t.)	Fulham (1)	Bloomfield Road, Blackpool
20:00	Delfouneso 82'	Report	Richardson 90+4'; Hangeland 116'	Attendance: 8,706; Referee: Andre Marriner

5 January 2013	Aston Villa (1)	2–1	Ipswich Town (2)	Villa Park, Birmingham
15:00	Bent 46'; Weimann 83'	Report	Chopra 31'	Attendance: 24,854; Referee: Jon Moss

5 January 2013	Charlton Athletic (2)	0–1	Huddersfield Town (2)	The Valley, Charlton
15:00		Report	Beckford 11'	Attendance: 6,657; Referee: Darren Drysdale

5 January 2013	Macclesfield Town (5)	2–1	Cardiff City (2)	Moss Rose, Macclesfield
15:00	Barnes-Homer 85', 88' (pen.)	Report	Jarvis 57'	Attendance: 3,165; Referee: Andy Madley

5 January 2013	Barnsley (2)	1–0	Burnley (2)	Oakwell, Barnsley
15:00	Rose 85'	Report		Attendance: 5,091; Referee: Paul Tierney

5 January 2013	Manchester City (1)	3–0	Watford (2)	Etihad Stadium, Manchester
15:00	Tevez 25'; Barry 44'; Lopes 90+1'	Report		Attendance: 46,821; Referee: Phil Dowd

6 January 2013	Swansea City (1)	2–2	Arsenal (1)	Liberty Stadium, Swansea
13:30	Michu 58'; Graham 87'	Report	Podolski 81'; Gibbs 83'	Attendance: 18,848; Referee: Howard Webb

16 January 2013 Replay	Arsenal (1)	1–0	Swansea City (1)	Emirates Stadium, London
19:30	Wilshere 86'	Report		Attendance: 58,359; Referee: Mark Clattenburg

5 January 2013	Leicester City (2)	2–0	Burton Albion (4)	King Power Stadium, Leicester
15:00	Wood 3'; De Laet 21'	Report		Attendance: 14,463; Referee: Andy D'Urso

5 January 2013	Millwall (2)	1–0	Preston North End (3)	The Den, South Bermondsey
15:00	Feeney 31'	Report		Attendance: 5,364; Referee: Craig Pawson

7 January 2013	Cheltenham Town (4)	1–5	Everton (1)	Whaddon Road, Cheltenham
19:45	Penn 51'	Report	Jelavić 12'; Baines 21' (pen.); Osman 49'; Coleman 58'; Fellaini 89'	Attendance: 6,891; Referee: Kevin Friend

5 January 2013	Derby County (2)	5–0	Tranmere Rovers (3)	Pride Park Stadium, Derby
15:00	Davies 42'; Sammon 54'; Brayford 63'; Hendrick 72'; Bennett 87'	Report		Attendance: 11,740; Referee: Mark Halsey

5 January 2013	Crawley Town (3)	1–3	Reading (1)	Broadfield Stadium, Crawley
15:00	Adams 1'	Report	Le Fondre 13', 49' (pen.); Hunt 44'	Attendance: 5,880; Referee: Anthony Taylor

5 January 2013	Aldershot Town (4)	3–1	Rotherham United (4)	Recreation Ground, Aldershot
15:00	Hylton 6', 23', 62'	Report	Frecklington 71' (pen.)	Attendance: 2,992; Referee: Gavin Ward

5 January 2013	Middlesbrough (2)	4–1	Hastings United (7)	Riverside Stadium, Middlesbrough
15:00	Zemmama 23', 68'; Halliday 47'; Miller 85'	Report	Goldberg 69'	Attendance: 12,579; Referee: Graham Salisbury

5 January 2013	Oxford United (4)	0–3	Sheffield United (3)	Kassam Stadium, Oxford
15:00		Report	McMahon 17'; Kitson 68'; Blackman 87'	Attendance: 7,079; Referee: Carl Boyeson

5 January 2013	Southampton (1)	1–5	Chelsea (1)	St Mary's Stadium, Southampton
15:00	Rodriguez 17'	Report	Ba 35', 61'; Moses 45+2'; Ivanović 52'; Lampard 83' (pen.)	Attendance: 27,813; Referee: Mike Dean

5 January 2013	Queens Park Rangers (1)	1–1	West Bromwich Albion (1)	Loftus Road, Shepherd's Bush
15:00	Dyer 90+1'	Report	Long 78'	Attendance: 8,984; Referee: Mark Clattenburg

15 January 2013 Replay	West Bromwich Albion (1)	0–1	Queens Park Rangers (1)	The Hawthorns, West Bromwich
20:00		Report	Bothroyd 75'	Attendance: 11,184; Referee: Martin Atkinson

5 January 2013	Peterborough United (2)	0–3	Norwich City (1)	London Road Stadium, Peterborough
15:00		Report	E. Bennett 30'; Jackson 41'; Snodgrass 70'	Attendance: 13,198; Referee: Stuart Attwell

6 January 2013	Mansfield Town (5)	1–2	Liverpool (1)	Field Mill, Mansfield
16:00	Green 79'	Report	Sturridge 7'; Suárez 59'	Attendance: 7,574; Referee: Andre Marriner

5 January 2013	Bolton Wanderers (2)	2–2	Sunderland (1)	Reebok Stadium, Horwich
15:00	Lee Chung-Yong 12'; Sordell 48'	Report	Wickham 60'; Gardner 75'	Attendance: 12,204; Referee: Michael Jones

15 January 2013 Replay	Sunderland (1)	0–2	Bolton Wanderers (2)	Stadium of Light, Sunderland
19:45		Report	Sordell 64' (pen.), 73'	Attendance: 17,505; Referee: Kevin Friend

5 January 2013	Nottingham Forest (2)	2–3	Oldham Athletic (3)	City Ground, Nottingham
15:00	Smith 13' (o.g.); Sharp 90+4'	Report	Simpson 54', 58'; Baxter 61'	Attendance: 11,293; Referee: Roger East

5 January 2013	West Ham United (1)	2–2	Manchester United (1)	Boleyn Ground, Upton Park
17:15	Collins 27', 59'	Report	Cleverley 23'; Van Persie 90+1'	Attendance: 32,922; Referee: Martin Atkinson

16 January 2013 Replay	Manchester United (1)	1–0	West Ham United (1)	Old Trafford, Trafford
20:05	Rooney 9'	Report		Attendance: 71,081; Referee: Phil Dowd

5 January 2013	Hull City (2)	1–1	Leyton Orient (3)	KC Stadium, Kingston upon Hull
15:00	Proschwitz 90+3'	Report	Mooney 78'	Attendance: 8,585; Referee: Iain Williamson

15 January 2013 Replay	Leyton Orient (3)	1–2 (a.e.t.)	Hull City (2)	Matchroom Stadium, Leyton
19:45	Cox 87'	Report	Proschwitz 41'; Cairney 117'	Attendance: 3,601; Referee: Graham Scott

5 January 2013	Blackburn Rovers (2)	2–0	Bristol City (2)	Ewood Park, Blackburn
15:00	Murphy 7'; G. Hanley 58'	Report		Attendance: 5,504; Referee: Nigel Miller

5 January 2013	Leeds United (2)	1–1	Birmingham City (2)	Elland Road, Leeds
15:00	Becchio 60'	Report	Elliott 32'	Attendance: 11,447; Referee: Chris Foy

15 January 2013 Replay	Birmingham City (2)	1–2	Leeds United (2)	St Andrew's, Birmingham
19:45	Elliott 36'	Report	McCormack 70'; Diouf 76' (pen.)	Attendance: 8,962; Referee: Andy Woolmer

5 January 2013	Southend United (4)	2–2	Brentford (3)	Roots Hall, Southend-on-Sea
15:00	Corr 39', 54'	Report	Adeyemi 29'; Cresswell 38' (o.g.)	Attendance: 5,540; Referee: Dean Whitestone

15 January 2013 Replay	Brentford (3)	2–1	Southend United (4)	Griffin Park, Brentford
19:45	Hayes 26'; Donaldson 76'	Report	Corr 69'	Attendance: 6,526; Referee: Darren Drysdale

5 January 2013	Luton Town (5)	1–0	Wolverhampton Wanderers (2)	Kenilworth Road, Luton
15:00	Lawless 46'	Report		Attendance: 9,638; Referee: Geoff Eltringham

5 January 2013	Sheffield Wednesday (2)	0–0	Milton Keynes Dons (3)	Hillsborough Stadium, Owlerton
15:00		Report		Attendance: 11,462; Referee: Michael Oliver

15 January 2013 Replay	Milton Keynes Dons (3)	2–0	Sheffield Wednesday (2)	Stadium mk, Milton Keynes
19:45	Williams 28' (pen.); Bowditch 75'	Report		Attendance: 6,782; Referee: Lee Collins

== Fourth round proper ==
The draw for the fourth round took place on 6 January 2013, with Macclesfield Town and Luton Town, both from the Conference National (Step 5), remaining as the lowest-placed teams still in the competition.

25 January 2013	Millwall (2)	2–1	Aston Villa (1)	The Den, South Bermondsey
19:45	Shittu 27'; Marquis 89'	Report	Bent 22'	Attendance: 15,007; Referee: Neil Swarbrick

26 January 2013	Stoke City (1)	0–1	Manchester City (1)	Britannia Stadium, Stoke-on-Trent
12:45		Report	Zabaleta 85'	Attendance: 19,814; Referee: Howard Webb

26 January 2013	Norwich City (1)	0–1	Luton Town (5)	Carrow Road, Norwich
15:00		Report	Rendell 80'	Attendance: 26,521; Referee: Andre Marriner

26 January 2013	Macclesfield Town (5)	0–1	Wigan Athletic (1)	Moss Rose, Macclesfield
15:00		Report	Gómez 7' (pen.)	Attendance: 5,849; Referee: Roger East

26 January 2013	Derby County (2)	0–3	Blackburn Rovers (2)	Pride Park Stadium, Derby
15:00		Report	Kazim-Richards 44'; Dann 66'; Rhodes 71'	Attendance: 14,013; Referee: Stuart Attwell

26 January 2013	Hull City (2)	0–1	Barnsley (2)	KC Stadium, Kingston upon Hull
15:00		Report	Dagnall 70'	Attendance: 9,932; Referee: Keith Stroud

26 January 2013	Middlesbrough (2)	2–1	Aldershot Town (4)	Riverside Stadium, Middlesbrough
15:00	Jutkiewicz 83', 90+6'	Report	Hylton 89'	Attendance: 12,684; Referee: Andy Madley

26 January 2013	Brighton & Hove Albion (2)	2–3	Arsenal (1)	Falmer Stadium, Falmer
15:00	Barnes 33'; Ulloa 62'	Report	Giroud 16', 56'; Walcott 85'	Attendance: 27,113; Referee: Michael Oliver

26 January 2013	Reading (1)	4–0	Sheffield United (3)	Madejski Stadium, Reading
15:00	Hunt 6', 50'; Leigertwood 40'; McCleary 54'	Report		Attendance: 14,715; Referee: Chris Foy

26 January 2013	Huddersfield Town (2)	1–1	Leicester City (2)	John Smith's Stadium, Huddersfield
15:00	Novak 74' (pen.)	Report	Wood 82'	Attendance: 11,945; Referee: Anthony Taylor

12 February 2013 Replay	Leicester City (2)	1–2	Huddersfield Town (2)	King Power Stadium, Leicester
19:30	Keane 7'	Report	Clayton 5'; Scannell 75'	Attendance: 14,517; Referee: James Adcock

26 January 2013	Queens Park Rangers (1)	2–4	Milton Keynes Dons (3)	Loftus Road, Shepherd's Bush
15:00	Bothroyd 83'; Fábio 90+2'	Report	Traoré 4' (o.g.); Lowe 40'; Harley 50'; Potter 56'	Attendance: 17,081; Referee: Mike Dean

26 January 2013	Bolton Wanderers (2)	1–2	Everton (1)	Reebok Stadium, Horwich
15:00	Sordell 27'	Report	Pienaar 18'; Heitinga 90+1'	Attendance: 18,760; Referee: Martin Atkinson

26 January 2013	Manchester United (1)	4–1	Fulham (1)	Old Trafford, Trafford
17:30	Giggs 3' (pen.); Rooney 50'; Hernández 52', 66'	Report	Hughes 77'	Attendance: 72,596; Referee: Mark Clattenburg

27 January 2013	Brentford (3)	2–2	Chelsea (1)	Griffin Park, Brentford
12:00	Trotta 42'; Forrester 73' (pen.)	Report	Oscar 55'; Torres 83'	Attendance: 12,146; Referee: Jon Moss

17 February 2013 Replay	Chelsea (1)	4–0	Brentford (3)	Stamford Bridge, London
12:00	Mata 55'; Oscar 68'; Lampard 71'; Terry 81'	Report		Attendance: 40,961; Referee: Neil Swarbrick

27 January 2013	Leeds United (2)	2–1	Tottenham Hotspur (1)	Elland Road, Leeds
14:00	Varney 15'; McCormack 50'	Report	Dempsey 58'	Attendance: 29,943; Referee: Kevin Friend

27 January 2013	Oldham Athletic (3)	3–2	Liverpool (1)	Boundary Park, Oldham
16:00	Smith 3', 45'; Wabara 48'	Report	Suárez 17'; Allen 80'	Attendance: 10,295; Referee: Lee Probert

== Fifth round proper ==
The draw for the fifth round took place on 27 January 2013, with Luton Town from the Conference National (5) remaining as the lowest-ranked team still in the Cup.

16 February 2013	Luton Town (5)	0–3	Millwall (2)	Kenilworth Road, Luton
12:45		Report	Henry 12'; Hulse 36'; N'Guessan 86'	Attendance: 9,768; Referee: Lee Probert

16 February 2013	Milton Keynes Dons (3)	1–3	Barnsley (2)	Stadium mk, Milton Keynes
15:00	Bowditch 61'	Report	Dagnall 3', 90+1'; Harewood 19'	Attendance: 14,475; Referee: Mike Jones

16 February 2013	Arsenal (1)	0–1	Blackburn Rovers (2)	Emirates Stadium, London
15:00		Report	Kazim-Richards 72'	Attendance: 60,070; Referee: Mike Dean

16 February 2013	Oldham Athletic (3)	2–2	Everton (1)	Boundary Park, Oldham
18:00	Obita 13'; Smith 90+5'	Report	Anichebe 24'; Jagielka 48'	Attendance: 9,473; Referee: Phil Dowd

26 February 2013 Replay	Everton (1)	3–1	Oldham Athletic (3)	Goodison Park, Liverpool
19:45	Mirallas 15'; Baines 34' (pen.); Osman 62'	Report	Smith 64'	Attendance: 32,688; Referee: Michael Oliver

17 February 2013	Manchester City (1)	4–0	Leeds United (2)	Etihad Stadium, Manchester
14:00	Y. Touré 5'; Agüero 15' (pen.), 74'; Tevez 52'	Report		Attendance: 46,849; Referee: Mark Clattenburg

17 February 2013	Huddersfield Town (2)	1–4	Wigan Athletic (1)	John Smith's Stadium, Huddersfield
15:55	Novak 62'	Report	McManaman 31'; Koné 40', 89'; McArthur 56'	Attendance: 12,117; Referee: Michael Oliver

18 February 2013	Manchester United (1)	2–1	Reading (1)	Old Trafford, Trafford
20:00	Nani 69'; Hernández 72'	Report	McAnuff 81'	Attendance: 75,213; Referee: Andre Marriner

27 February 2013	Middlesbrough (2)	0–2	Chelsea (1)	Riverside Stadium, Middlesbrough
19:45		Report	Ramires 51'; Moses 73'	Attendance: 27,856; Referee: Martin Atkinson

== Sixth round proper ==
The draw for the quarter-finals took place on 17 February 2013, with Barnsley, Millwall and Blackburn Rovers all from the Championship remaining as the lowest-ranked teams.

9 March 2013	Everton (1)	0–3	Wigan Athletic (1)	Goodison Park, Liverpool
12:45		Report	Figueroa 30'; McManaman 31'; Gómez 33'	Attendance: 35,068; Referee: Kevin Friend

9 March 2013	Manchester City (1)	5–0	Barnsley (2)	Etihad Stadium, Manchester
17:30	Tevez 11', 31', 50'; Kolarov 27'; Silva 65'	Report		Attendance: 46,728; Referee: Anthony Taylor

10 March 2013	Millwall (2)	0–0	Blackburn Rovers (2)	The Den, South Bermondsey
14:00		Report		Attendance: 14,885; Referee: Martin Atkinson

13 March 2013 Replay	Blackburn Rovers (2)	0–1	Millwall (2)	Ewood Park, Blackburn
19:30		Report	Shittu 42'	Attendance: 8,635; Referee: Mark Clattenburg

10 March 2013	Manchester United (1)	2–2	Chelsea (1)	Old Trafford, Trafford
16:30	Hernández 5'; Rooney 11'	Report	Hazard 59'; Ramires 68'	Attendance: 75,196; Referee: Howard Webb

1 April 2013 Replay	Chelsea (1)	1–0	Manchester United (1)	Stamford Bridge, London
12:30	Ba 49'	Report		Attendance: 40,704; Referee: Phil Dowd

== Semi-finals ==
The draw for the semi-finals took place on 10 March 2013, with Millwall from the Championship (2) remaining as the lowest-placed team still in the Cup. The draw was carried out by Edgar Davids and Graeme Le Saux at Wembley Stadium in London.

13 April 2013	Millwall (2)	0–2	Wigan Athletic (1)	Wembley Stadium, London
17:15		Report	Maloney 25'; McManaman 78'	Attendance: 62,335; Referee: Michael Oliver

14 April 2013	Chelsea (1)	1–2	Manchester City (1)	Wembley Stadium, London
16:00	Ba 66'	Report	Nasri 35'; Agüero 47'	Attendance: 85,621; Referee: Chris Foy

== Final ==
Manchester City had already qualified for the 2013–14 UEFA Champions League based on their league position, therefore Wigan Athletic had already secured a place in the 2013–14 UEFA Europa League, regardless of whether they won or lost.

11 May 2013
17:15 BST

Manchester City	0–1	Wigan Athletic
	Report, Statistics, Manchester City squad numbers, Wigan Athletic squad numbers	Watson 90+1'

Wembley Stadium, London
Attendance: 86,254
Referee: Andre Marriner (West Midlands)

== Top scorers ==
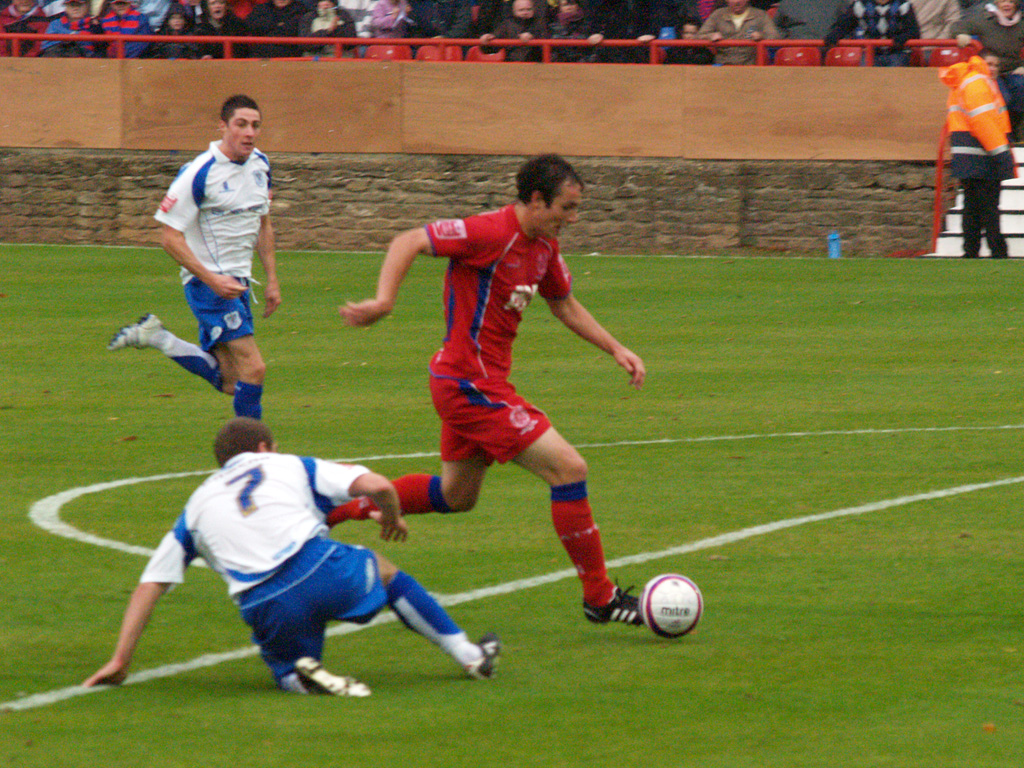
Danny Hylton (in red), playing for Aldershot Town, was the competition's top scorer with 8 goals.

As of 11 May 2013

Rank	Player	Club	Goals
1	(England) Danny Hylton	Aldershot Town	8
2	(Argentina) Carlos Tevez	Manchester City	5
3	(Senegal) Demba Ba	Chelsea	4
3	(Republic of Ireland) Barry Corr	Southend United	4
3	(England) Dean Cox	Leyton Orient	4
3	(Jamaica) Clayton Donaldson	Brentford	4
3	(England) Will Hatfield	Accrington Stanley	4
3	(Mexico) Javier Hernández	Manchester United	4
3	(Republic of Ireland) Dave Mooney	Leyton Orient	4
3	(England) Scott Rendell	Luton Town	4
3	(England) Matt Smith	Oldham Athletic	4
3	(England) Marvin Sordell	Bolton Wanderers	4

== Media Coverage ==
The domestic broadcasting rights for the competition were held by the free-to-air channel ITV and the subscription channel ESPN. ITV has held the rights since 2008–09, while ESPN gained FA Cup coverage from the 2010–11 season following the collapse of Setanta in the UK. Under the Ofcom code of protected sporting events, the FA Cup Final must be broadcast live on UK terrestrial television.

Round	Date	Teams	Kick-off	Channels	
Round	Date	Teams	Kick-off	Digital	TV
First Round	2 November	Cambridge City vs Milton Keynes Dons	19:30	—N/a	ESPN
First Round	4 November	~~Braintree Town vs Tranmere Rovers~~	~~12:30~~	~~ITV Hub~~	~~ITV1~~ (Note: Braintree Town vs Tranmere Rovers was originally scheduled to be held on January 4th at 12:30pm on ITV but was postponed due to a waterlogged pitch, the game was rearranged for January 13th at 7:45pm but due to the postponement, it was moved to ITV4.)
First Round	4 November	Dorchester Town vs Plymouth Argyle	16:30	—N/a	ESPN
First Round	13 November	Braintree Town vs Tranmere Rovers	19:45	ITV Hub	ITV4
First Round (Replay)	12 November	AFC Wimbledon vs York City	19:45	—N/a	ESPN
First Round (Replay)	15 November	Altrincham vs Burton Albion	19:45	—N/a	ESPN
Second Round	2 December	Milton Keynes Dons vs AFC Wimbledon	12:30	ITV Hub	ITV1
Second Round	2 December	Alfreton Town vs Leyton Orient	15:15	—N/a	ESPN
Second Round	3 December	Cheltenham Town vs Hereford United	19:45	—N/a	ESPN
Second Round (Replay)	12 December	Mansfield Town vs Lincoln City	19:45	—N/a	ESPN
Second Round (Replay)	13 December	Hastings United vs Harrogate Town	19:45	—N/a	ESPN
Third Round	5 January	Brighton & Hove Albion vs Newcastle United	12:30	ITV Hub	ITV1
Third Round	5 January	West Ham United vs Manchester United	17:15	ITV Hub	ITV1
Third Round	6 January	Swansea City vs Arsenal	13:30	—N/a	ESPN
Third Round	6 January	Mansfield Town vs Liverpool	16:00	—N/a	ESPN
Third Round	7 January	Cheltenham Town vs Everton	19:45	—N/a	ESPN
Third Round (Replay)	16 January	Arsenal vs Swansea City	19:30	—N/a	ESPN
Third Round (Replay)	16 January	Manchester United vs West Ham United	20:05	ITV Hub	ITV
Fourth Round	26 January	Stoke City vs Manchester City	12:45	ITV Hub	ITV
Fourth Round	26 January	Manchester United vs Fulham	16:30	—N/a	ESPN
Fourth Round	27 January	Brentford vs Chelsea	12:00	—N/a	ESPN
Fourth Round	27 January	Leeds United vs Tottenham Hotspur	14:00	—N/a	ESPN
Fourth Round	27 January	Oldham Athletic vs Liverpool	16:00	ITV Hub	ITV
Fourth Round (Replay)	12 February	Leicester City vs Huddersfield Town	19:30	—N/a	ESPN
Fourth Round (Replay)	17 February	Chelsea vs Brentford	12:00	ITV Hub	ITV
Fifth Round	16 February	Luton Town vs Millwall	12:45	—N/a	ESPN
Fifth Round	16 February	Oldham Athletic vs Everton	18:00	ITV Hub	ITV
Fifth Round	17 February	Manchester City vs Leeds United	14:00	—N/a	ESPN
Fifth Round	17 February	Huddersfield Town vs Wigan Athletic	15:55	ITV Hub	ITV
Fifth Round	18 February	Manchester United vs Reading	20:00	—N/a	ESPN
Fifth Round (Replay)	26 February	Everton v Oldham Athletic	19:45	ITV Hub	ITV
Sixth Round	9 March	Everton vs Wigan Athletic	12:45	ITV Hub	ITV
Sixth Round	9 March	Manchester City vs Barnsley	17:30	—N/a	ESPN
Sixth Round	10 March	Millwall vs Blackburn Rovers	14:00	—N/a	ESPN
Sixth Round	10 March	Manchester United vs Chelsea	16:30	ITV Hub	ITV
Sixth Round (Replay)	13 March	Blackburn Rovers vs Millwall	19:30	—N/a	ESPN
Sixth Round (Replay)	1 April	Chelsea vs Manchester United	12:30	ITV Hub	ITV
Semi-Finals	13 April	Millwall vs Wigan Athletic	17:15	—N/a	ESPN
Semi-Finals	14 April	Chelsea v Manchester City	16:00	ITV Hub	ITV
Final	11 May	Manchester City v Wigan Athletic	17:15	ITV Hub	ITV
Final	11 May	Manchester City v Wigan Athletic	17:15	—N/a	ESPN
