= Robin Follman =

American opera singer

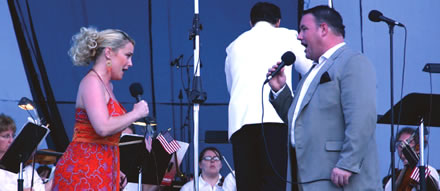
Robin Follman and Scott Ramsay performan as part of the National Endowment for the Arts' Great American Voices concert at Camp Lejeune on July 4, 2005.

Robin Follman (born December 9, 1969), also known by her married name Robin Follman-Otta, is an American operatic soprano and business woman. She had an active international performance career until her retirement from performance in 2012. She is the current CEO of Markall Inc., which has its headquarters in Santa Ana, California

== Career ==
Robin Follman began her professional performance career in musical theatre at the age of 16 in Orange County, California. She studied business at Saddleback College. After completing her associate's degree, she went to Tokyo, where she starred in a musical entitled Fairyland that featured singing animatronic robots alongside human performers. After returning to the United States, she pursued vocal training at the Jacobs School of Music at Indiana University Bloomington, and graduated from that university with a degree in psychology. While a student there, she began her professional opera career performing with the Indianapolis Opera; making her debut in The Merry Widow.

Her opera credits include performances with Houston Grand Opera, Los Angeles Opera, New York City Opera, Washington National Opera, Michigan Opera Theater, Opera Pacific, Florentine Opera, Singapore Lyric Opera, Lyric Opera Malaysia, Hawaii Opera and Opera Carolina, among others.

Her concert work includes performances with the English Chamber Orchestra, the Saint Louis Symphony, the Pacific Symphony Orchestra, the Richmond Symphony, the International Italian Orchestra, the Milwaukee Symphony Orchestra and the Alabama Symphony, among others.

In 2012, Follman retired from performance. In a 2018 interview with music journalist Anne Midgette in The Washington Post, she stated that Florentine Opera Company's General director, William Florescu, had "subjected her to nonconsensual sexual acts" during the rehearsal period for that company's 2008 production of Madama Butterfly, for which Follman portrayed the title role. According to Follman, this negative experience played a significant role in her decision to cease her performance career. After an investigation, Florescu abruptly left his position with the Florentine Opera Company.
