= Scott Ramsey =

Scott Ramsey may refer to:

- Scott Ramsey (cinematographer) in Little Red Riding Hood (1997 film)
- Scott Ramsey (musician) on With Abandon

== See also ==
- Scott Ramsay (disambiguation)
