= Nathaniel Pinney =

English footballer

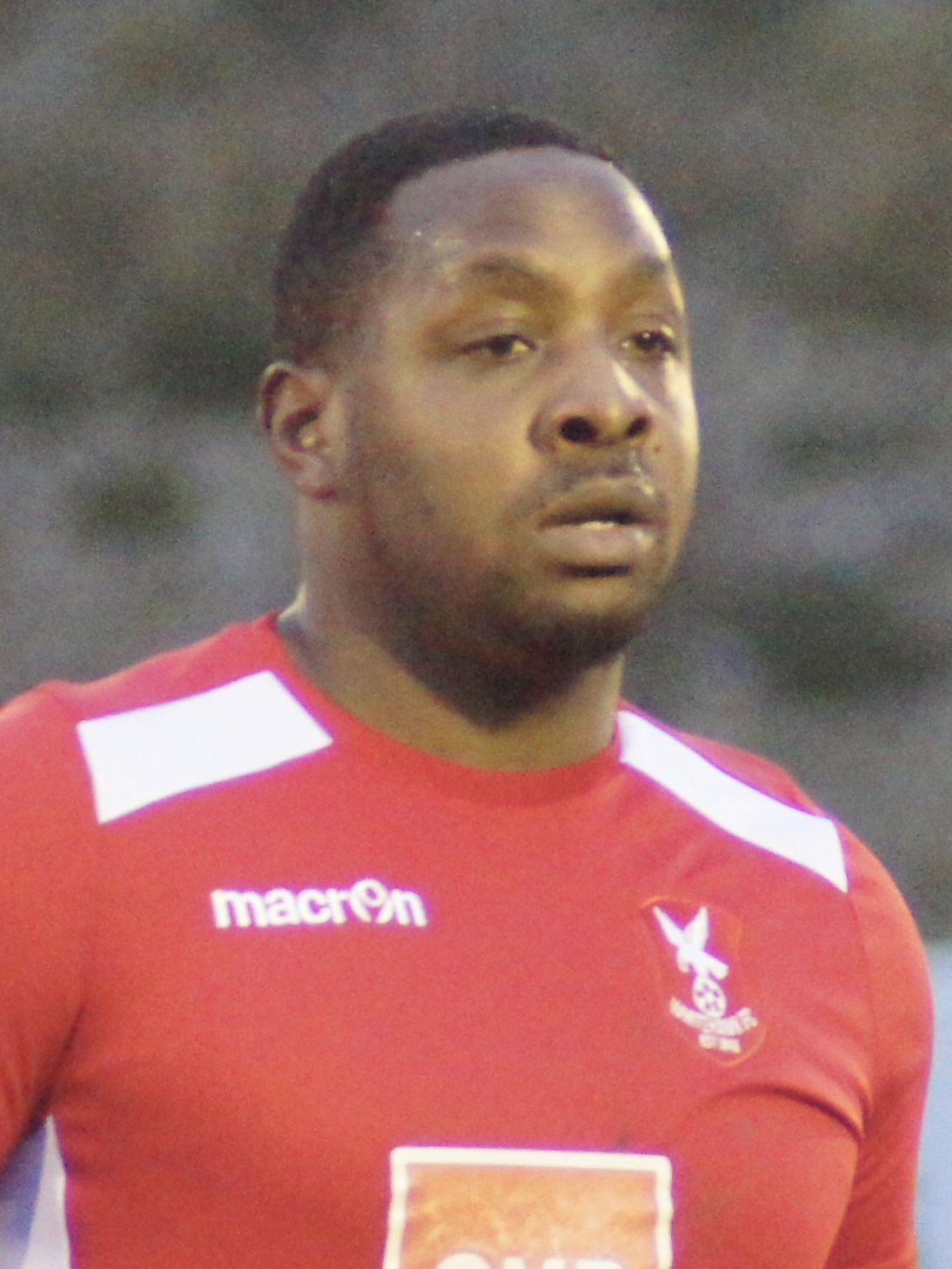
- Pinney playing for Whitehawk in 2018

Personal information
- Full name: Nathaniel Barrington Pinney
- Date of birth: 16 November 1990 (age 35)
- Place of birth: South Norwood, England
- Height: 6 ft 0 in (1.83 m)
- Position: Striker

Team information
- Current team: Corinthian-Casuals

Youth career
- 2008–2009: Crystal Palace

Senior career*
Years	Team	Apps	(Gls)
2009–2012	Crystal Palace	3	(0)
2009–2010	→ Woking (loan)	17	(6)
2010	→ Dagenham & Redbridge (loan)	1	(0)
2011	→ Braintree Town (loan)	7	(3)
2011–2012	→ Ebbsfleet United (loan)	25	(10)
2012	Croydon		
2012–2013	Carshalton Athletic	35	(22)
2013–2014	Tonbridge Angels	32	(12)
2013–2014	→ Dulwich Hamlet (loan)	5	(1)
2014	Kingstonian	28	(12)
2014–2017	Eastbourne Borough	115	(40)
2017	St Albans City	7	(3)
2017–18	Whitehawk	18	(6)
2018	Welling United	1	(0)
2018–2019	Whitehawk	26	(10)
2019–	Corinthian-Casuals		
- * Club domestic league appearances and goals as of 15:08,28 April 2019 (UTC)

Nathaniel Barrington Pinney (born 28 December 1990) is an English footballer who plays for Corinthian-Casuals as a striker.

== Career ==
Born in South Norwood, London, Pinney joined Crystal Palace and made his league debut on 11 April 2009, coming on in the 89th minute, as a substitute for Rui Fonte, in a 2–0 home defeat to Cardiff City.

Having made only one other appearance for Crystal Palace, in a League Cup game against Yeovil Town in August 2010, Pinney signed for Dagenham and Redbridge in October 2010 on a one-month loan and Conference South leaders Braintree Town on a short-term loan in March 2011.

Pinney joined Ebbsfleet United of the Conference National on 5 November 2011 on an initial one-month loan. This was extended by a further month on 5 December 2011. After impressing at Ebbsfleet his loan was extended to the end of the season, he has been used in a few roles, playing on both wings and as a striker. He was officially released by Crystal Palace on 30 April 2012.

Answering a call from newly appointed Carshalton Athletic manager Tommy Williams, Pinney joined the club in October 2012. He scored 21 league goals for the Isthmian League Premier Division club in the 2012–13 season.

Pinney gained some national attention in late 2012, when he was named in an interview by then Crystal Palace and England winger Wilfried Zaha as the player he could not displace in the Palace youth set-up.

Pinney joined Conference South club Eastbourne Borough from previous club Kingstonian on 11 December 2014. Pinney made his debut for Borough in a 3–2 defeat to Chelmsford City on 13 December 2014. He came on in the 75th minute as a substitute and scored in the 81st which almost got Borough the draw but Chelmsford scored in stoppage time to take the win. He then made his home debut a week later against league leaders Boreham Wood as an 86th-minute substitute, scoring Borough's fourth goal in a 4–1 win.

Pinney was voted Eastbourne's Player of the Year and finished as top scorer for the club for the 2015–16 season. Pinney scored the only goal in the final of the 2015–16 Sussex Senior Cup, winning the cup for Eastbourne Borough.

Pinney was released by The Sports in October 2017, signing briefly for St Albans City before returning to Sussex to join Whitehawk in December. Pinney scored 10 minutes into his debut at East Thurrock United on 23 December 2017. He left the Hawks for Welling United at the end of the season but returned to Whitehawk in November 2018.

== Career statistics ==
As of match played 14 October 2017.

Appearances and goals by club, season and competition
Club	Season	League			FA Cup		League Cup		Other		Total	
Club	Season	Division	Apps	Goals	Apps	Goals	Apps	Goals	Apps	Goals	Apps	Goals
Crystal Palace	2008–09	Championship	1	0	0	0	0	0	—		1	0
Crystal Palace	2010–11	Championship	0	0	0	0	1	0	—		1	0
Crystal Palace	Total		1	0	0	0	1	0	—		2	0
Woking (loan)	2009–10	Conference South	17	6	0	0	—		1 (Note: Appearance(s) in FA Trophy)	1	18	7
Dagenham & Redbridge (loan)	2010–11	League Two	1	0	0	0	0	0	0	0	1	0
Braintree Town (loan)	2010–11	Conference South	7	2	0	0	—		0	0	7	2
Ebbsfleet United (loan)	2011–12	Conference Premier	25	7	0	0	—		3	1	28	8
Carshalton Athletic	2012–13	Isthmian Premier Division	25(5)	21	0	0	0	0	4(1)	1	35	22
Tonbridge Angels	2013–14	Conference South	32	5	0	0	—		2	0	34	5
Dulwich Hamlet (loan)	2013–14	Isthmian League Premier	5	1	0	0	—		0	0	5	1
Kingstonian	2014–15	Isthmian League Premier	28	9	0	0	—		0	0	28	9
Eastbourne Borough	2014–15	Conference South	21	4	0	0	—		0	0	21	4
Eastbourne Borough	2015–16	Conference South	40	17	3	3	—		8 (Note: Four appearances and two goals in FA Trophy, four appearances and four goals in Sussex Senior Cup.)	6	51	26
Eastbourne Borough	2016–17	Conference South	40	13	5	4	—		5 (Note: Two appearances and one goal in FA Trophy, three appearances and seven goals in Sussex Senior Cup.)	8	50	25
Eastbourne Borough	2016–17	Conference South	14	2	2	0	—		0	0	16	2
Eastbourne Borough	Total		115	36	10	7	—		13	14	138	57
Career total			261	87	8	7	1	0	24	17	296	111
