= Alec Denton =

English footballer

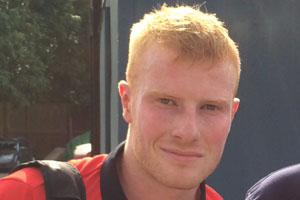

Personal information
- Date of birth: 30 July 1994 (age 32)
- Place of birth: Sheffield, England
- Position: Forward

Youth career
- 2006–2012: Rotherham United

Senior career*
Years	Team	Apps	(Gls)
2012–2013	Rotherham United	2	(0)
2012	→ Stocksbridge Park Steels (loan)		
2015	Clipstone	13	(18)
2016	Sheffield		
- * Club domestic league appearances and goals as of 31 August 2013

Alec Denton (born 30 July 1994) is an English footballer who plays as a forward.

== Career ==
Denton was born in Sheffield. He joined Rotherham United in 2006, having previously played for Worksop Town Juniors. In April 2010, Denton signed a two-year scholarship with the club after progressing through the Centre of Excellence. In March 2012, Denton joined Northern Premier League side Stocksbridge Park Steels on loan after impressing in a friendly against the club. On 5 May 2012, Denton made his professional debut for the Millers in a 1–1 draw with Northampton Town, coming on as a substitute for Sam Hoskins. He was then offered a one-year development professional contract.

His first appearance in the 2012-13 season was when he came on as a substitute in a game where Rotherham lost 3–0 to Southend United.

On 11 January, Denton and fellow Miller youngster Mitch Rose joined Stamford on a one-month loan deal.

On 2 May 2013, Denton was released by Rotherham.
