= Lee Frecklington =

British footballer (born 1985)

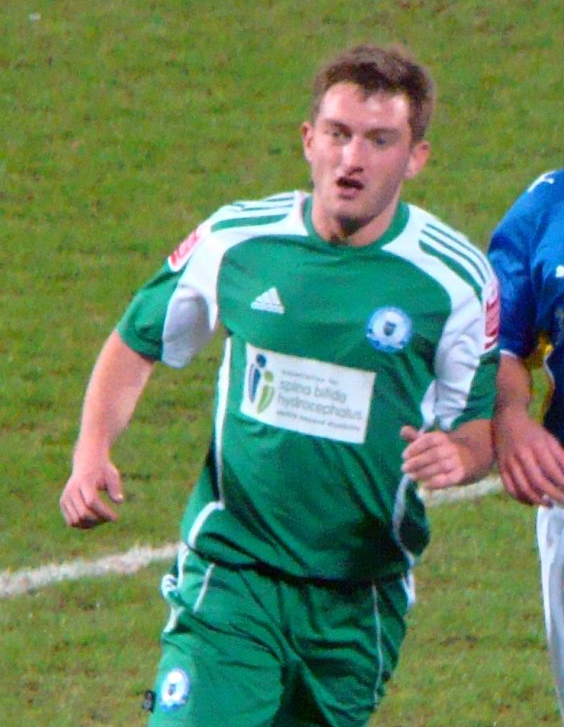
- Frecklington playing for Peterborough United

Personal information
- Full name: Lee Craig Frecklington
- Date of birth: 8 September 1985 (age 41)
- Place of birth: Lincoln, Lincolnshire, England
- Height: 5 ft 11 in (1.80 m)
- Position: Midfielder

Youth career
- 2002–2003: Lincoln City

Senior career*
Years	Team	Apps	(Gls)
2003–2009	Lincoln City	126	(21)
2003–2004	→ Lincoln United (loan)	1	(0)
2005–2006	→ Stamford (loan)	11	(1)
2009	→ Peterborough United (loan)	7	(0)
2009–2013	Peterborough United	86	(8)
2012–2013	→ Rotherham United (loan)	13	(2)
2013–2018	Rotherham United	157	(26)
2018–2020	Lincoln City	43	(7)
2021	Frickley Athletic	5	(1)
Total		448	(66)

International career
2006	Republic of Ireland B	1	(0)
- * Club domestic league appearances and goals as of 08:42, 4 May 2019 (UTC)

Lee Craig Frecklington (born 8 September 1985) is a former professional footballer who played as a midfielder.

Frecklington's came through the youth academy at home town club Lincoln City, he spent time on loan with Lincoln United and Stamford before going on to make 127 league appearances, scoring 21 goals. He was part of the Imps team that missed out on promotion to League One during the 2005–06 season. In 2009 he joined Peterborough United, later moving to Rotherham United in 2013 where he scored 26 times in 157 appearances, twice being promoted to the EFL Championship. He returned to Lincoln in 2017 and won the EFL Trophy and the 2019 League Two title. He retired in October 2021 after a brief spell with Non-League side Frickley Athletic. In 2006 he was capped by the Republic of Ireland B team.

== Club career ==
=== Lincoln City ===
Born in Lincoln, Lincolnshire, Frecklington made his way through Lincoln City's Centre of Excellence. He was rewarded with a scholarship place in the summer of 2002, where he was guided by former Lincoln Head Coach John Schofield. Frecklington's ability has long been noted and during his schooldays he undertook trials with both Norwich City and Leeds United.

He made rapid progress in Lincoln's youth set-up and in the 2003–04 season, the second year of his scholarship, moved towards the first team first impressing against Manchester City in a friendly game and then making his debut in the Football League Trophy against Telford United in October 2003. To further his development he joined Lincoln United on work experience in January 2004. His debut for United, against Workington on 17 January, was memorable as it was abandoned due to injury to the referee.

He continued his progression in the final season of his scholarship, making his Football League debut as a substitute in the game at Rochdale on 12 February 2005 and it was no surprise that he was handed a one-year professional contract by then manager Keith Alexander.

In his first season as a professional, Frecklington did not initially make the first team squad and in September 2005 he was loaned to Stamford in the Southern League Division One East to gain further experience, remaining until Lincoln recalled him in December 2005. While at Stamford he played alongside his uncle David Frecklington who had been an apprentice at Lincoln City in the mid-1990s. Upon his return to Sincil Bank he became a regular presence on the substitutes bench and on 4 February 2006 stepped off the bench to score his first league goal in the game at Stockport. His reward was his first league start the following week at home to Torquay United. Always impressing, he made 18 league appearances in the second half of the season though only three of these were starts.

In the 2006–07 season, however, he featured heavily in a very pivotal role towards Lincoln's unsuccessful push for promotion to League One, already boasting a number of exceptional performances. Frecklington was named in the PFA League Two Team of the Year for the 2006–07 season.

=== Peterborough United ===
Frecklington signed on an initial three-month loan deal with rivals Peterborough United on 6 February 2009. He made the move permanent on 15 May 2009. Frecklington scored his first Peterborough goal in a League Cup tie at Wycombe on 11 August 2009. On 17 August 2011, he scored in the 72nd minute against Millwall, the game finished 2–2 to earn Peterborough a point after being 2–0 down at The Den. Frecklington came on as a triple substitution on 3 December, when Peterborough were losing 3–0 with half an hour left to play, at home to Barnsley. He made an impact on the game and scored to pull it back to 3–3. However, despite Peterborough's effort, Barnsley went on to win 4–3 with a late goal. On 19 October 2012 Frecklington joined Rotherham United on an initial one-month loan.

=== Rotherham United ===
On 2 January 2013 following a successful loan spell, Frecklington signed for Rotherham United for an undisclosed fee on a two-and-a-half-year contract. Millers boss Steve Evans said "The competition to sign him has been fierce, but... Lee made it clear that his first choice was Rotherham." He helped Rotherham to second place in League Two which meant promotion in his first season at Rotherham, his personal highlight was scoring 'the millers' last goal of the season in added time to send Rotherham up, relegating Aldershot Town in the process. On the first day of the 2013–14 Football League One season Frecklington scored a brace as Rotherham came from 3–1 down to draw 3–3 against Crewe, then 3 days later he scored the winner against local rivals Sheffield Wednesday in a 2–1 victory in the League Cup. Frecklington's next goal came in a 3–2 home win against Oldham Athletic. Lee finished the season with 13 goals with 10 coming in the league. He scored in second leg of Rotherham's 4–2 aggregate victory over Preston in the playoff semi-final and despite him missing a penalty Rotherham won the 2014 League One Playoff Final against Leyton Orient on penalties to seal back to back promotions to the Football League Championship.

On 3 September 2015, Rotherham confirmed that Frecklington had been appointed new club captain, replacing former Millers skipper Greg Halford. Lee played a big part in helping Rotherham to two consecutive 21st-place finishes, hence surviving relegation twice but only played 22 games of the 2016–17 Championship due to injury as Rotherham finished last and were relegated back to Football League One.

=== Return to Lincoln City ===
On 11 January 2018, Rotherham confirmed the departure of Frecklington, who returned to his city of birth, signing for Lincoln City for an undisclosed fee. He marked his return with a goal, equalising in a 2–2 derby day draw with Notts County. Frecklington was made club captain following the departure of Luke Waterfall in August 2018. On 28 May 2020, it was announced Frecklington will leave the club for a second time at the end of his current contract.

=== Frickley Athletic ===
On 13 April 2021, Frickley Athletic announced that Frecklington had agreed to sign for the club, which is currently managed by his uncle Dave Frecklington, for the 2021–22 season. In the first game of the season, Frecklington scored a penalty to ensure a 1–0 win at Hebburn Town. After six appearances in all competitions for Frickley, and one goal, Frecklington retired due to an injury sustained while playing at the age of 36.

== International career ==
In November 2006, he was named in the Republic of Ireland B international squad for a friendly tie with Scotland. He qualified to play for Ireland due to fact that his maternal grandparents were born there.

== Personal life ==
Despite growing up in Lincoln, Frecklington and his family are supporters of Leeds United.

== Career statistics ==
As of 26 March 2020

Appearances and goals by club, season and competition
Club	Season	League			FA Cup		League Cup		Other		Total	
Club	Season	Division	Apps	Goals	Apps	Goals	Apps	Goals	Apps	Goals	Apps	Goals
Lincoln City	2003–04	Third Division	0	0	0	0	0	0	2 (Note: Appearances in Football League Trophy)	0	2	0
Lincoln City	2004–05	League Two	3	0	0	0	0	0	0	0	3	0
Lincoln City	2005–06	League Two	20	2	0	0	0	0	0	0	20	2
Lincoln City	2006–07	League Two	42	8	1	1	1	1	3 (Note: 1 Appearance in Football League Trophy and 2 appearances in League Two play-offs)	0	47	10
Lincoln City	2007–08	League Two	34	4	2	0	1	0	1	0	38	4
Lincoln City	2008–09	League Two	27	7	2	0	1	0	1	0	31	7
Lincoln City	Total		126	21	5	1	3	1	7	0	141	23
Stamford	2004–05	Southern Premier League	11	1	0	0	0	0	0	0	11	1
Peterborough United (loan)	2008–09	League One	7	0	0	0	0	0	0	0	7	0
Peterborough United	2009–10	Championship	35	2	1	0	4	2	0	0	40	4
Peterborough United	2010–11	League One	9	1	0	0	0	0	1	0	10	1
Peterborough United	2011–12	Championship	37	5	0	0	2	0	0	0	39	5
Peterborough United	2012–13	Championship	5	0	0	0	1	0	0	0	6	0
Peterborough United	Total		86	8	1	0	7	2	1	0	95	10
Rotherham United (loan)	2012–13	League Two	13	2	3	2	0	0	0	0	16	4
Rotherham United	2012–13	League Two	18	4	1	1	0	0	0	0	19	4
Rotherham United	2013–14	League One	39	10	2	1	2	1	6 (Note: 3 appearances in Football League Trophy and 3 appearances in League Two play-offs)	1	49	13
Rotherham United	2014–15	Championship	29	2	1	0	1	0	0	0	31	2
Rotherham United	2015–16	Championship	27	5	0	0	2	0	0	0	29	5
Rotherham United	2016–17	Championship	22	1	0	0	0	0	0	0	22	1
Rotherham United	2017–18	League One	19	4	0	0	1	0	0	0	20	4
Rotherham United	Total		154	26	4	2	6	1	6	1	170	30
Lincoln City	2017–18	League Two	16	4	—		—		4 (Note: 3 appearances in EFL Trophy and 1 appearance in League Two play-offs)	0	20	4
Lincoln City	2018–19	League Two	27	3	2	0	0	0	1	0	30	3
Lincoln City	2019–20	League One	0	0	0	0	0	0	1	0	1	0
Lincoln City	Total		43	7	2	0	0	0	6	0	51	7
Career Total			440	65	15	5	16	4	20	1	491	75

== Honours ==
Rotherham United

- Football League One play-offs: 2014
- Football League Two second-place promotion: 2012–13

Lincoln City

- EFL League Two: 2018–19
- EFL Trophy: 2017–18

Individual

- PFA Team of the Year: 2006–07 Football League Two
