= Scott Ramsay (tenor) =

American opera tenor

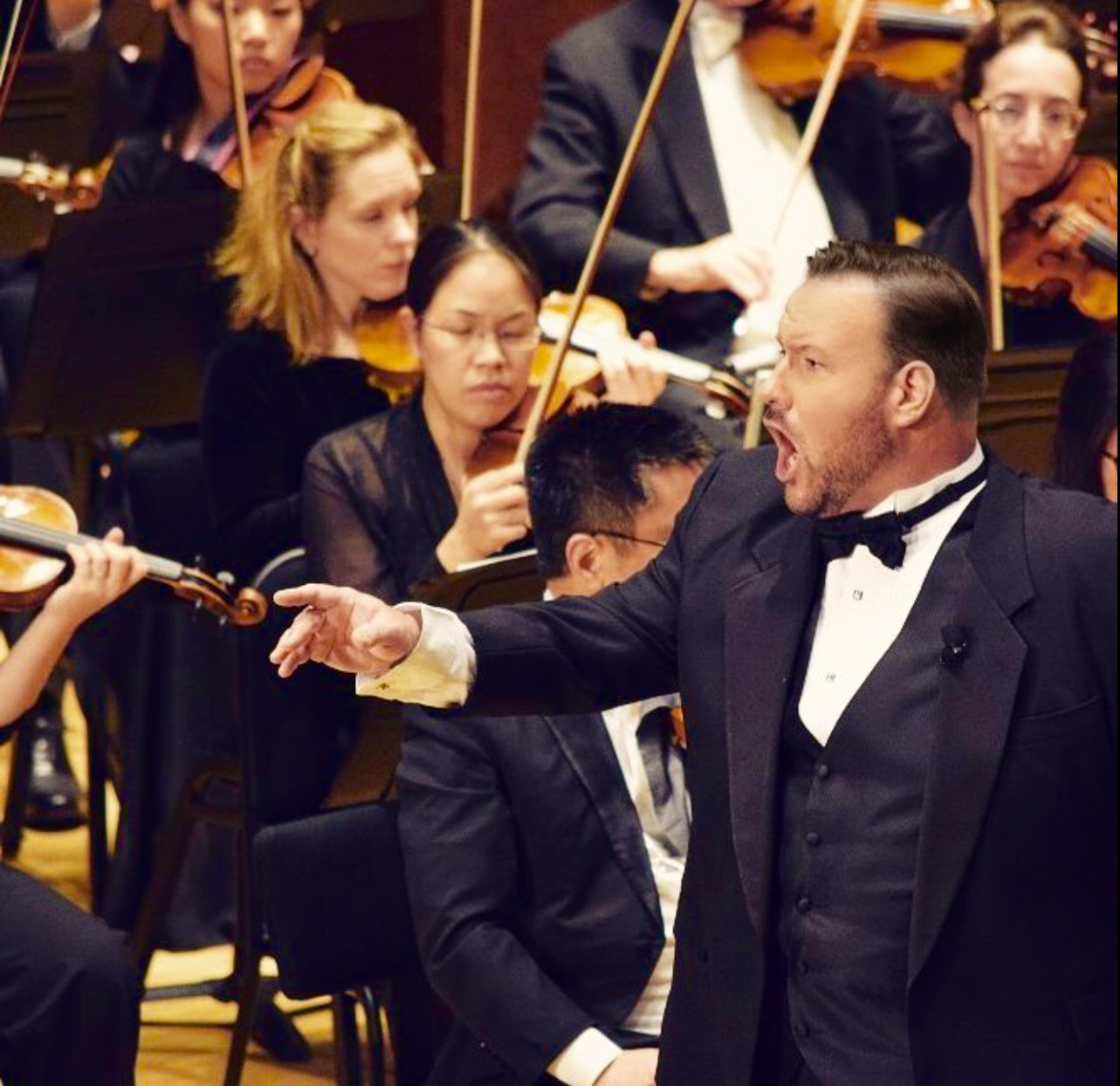
Scott Ramsay

Scott Ramsay is an American operatic tenor. His opera credits include performances with the Dublin International Opera Festival, the Lyric Opera of Chicago, Opera Grand Rapids, Syracuse Opera, San Francisco Opera, Opera New Jersey, Dayton Opera, Opera Boston, Opera Naples and Arizona Opera among others. His concert work includes performances with the Albany Symphony Orchestra, Toronto Symphony Orchestra, the Pacific Symphony, the Jacksonville Symphony, the American Symphony Orchestra, and the St. Louis Symphony Orchestra among others. Ramsay has also performed at several music festivals including the Berkshire Choral Festival, the Sugar Creek Festival, and the Ravinia Festival.
