= Scott Ramsay (footballer) =

English footballer

Personal information
- Date of birth: 16 October 1980 (age 46)
- Place of birth: Hastings, England
- Position: Striker

Team information
- Current team: Rye United

Senior career*
| Years | Team | Apps | (Gls) |
| 1999–2002 | Brighton & Hove Albion | 35 | (2) |
| 2001 | → Yeovil Town (loan) | 17 | (4) |
| 2001 | → Bognor Regis Town (loan) | 1 | (0) |
| 2002 | Dover Athletic | 13 | (1) |
| 2002–2008 | Eastbourne Borough | 283 | (135) |
| 2008–2010 | Hastings United | 72 | (10) |
| 2010–2012 | Rye United | | |
- * Club domestic league appearances and goals as of 23:24, 1 April 2009 (UTC)

Scott Ramsay (born 16 October 1980) is an English footballer.

== Brighton & Hove Albion ==
Scott Started his football career at Brighton & Hove Albion in 1999, making 2 goals in 35 appearances, 12 of which were first team starts. He had a 3-month loan spell at Yeovil Town in 2001 scoring 4 goals in 17 games. Followed by another loan spell at Bognor Regis. Failing to make the first team Scott was released by Micky Adams after a breach of his contract in 2001. On leaving Brighton & Hove Albion he joined Dover Athletic on a free transfer

== Non League ==
Ramsay played 13 games at Dover Athletic scoring only a single goal in a five-month spell before transferring back to East Sussex signing to Eastbourne Borough, who were then in the Southern League.

In 2003, Brentford sparked an interest in signing Scott for £25,000 after scoring 33 goals in the 2002/2003 season. Ramsay took two training sessions with the Bees, but Scott was reluctant to sign.

In the six years at Eastbourne Borough, Scott bagged 135 goals in 283 appearances, and helped the sussex side win the Sussex Senior Cup in 2002 and into the FA Cup first round in 2006 for the first time in the club's history. He also aided their rise into the Conference South football league and was part of the team that won a promotion into the Conference National league.

In June 2008, Ramsay left Eastbourne Borough after failing to agree to a new contract, signing for Hastings United, who "beat off competition from several higher league sides", such as AFC Wimbledon and Havant & Waterlooville to sign the prolific striker. Whilst at Hastings he converted to a central defensive role from his more familiar role as a striker.

In 2010, Ramsay moved to Rye United and played at the club until 2012.

== Honours ==
Brighton & Hove Albion

- Football League Third Division champions: 2000–01

Eastbourne Borough

- Southern League Eastern Division runners up: 2002–03
- Conference South play-off winners: 2007–08
