= Jamie Taylor =

English footballer

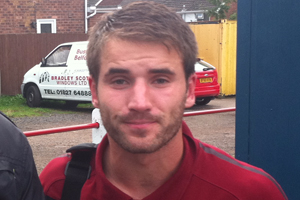

Personal information
- Full name: Jamie Taylor
- Date of birth: 16 December 1982 (age 43)
- Place of birth: Crawley, England
- Height: 5 ft 8 in (1.73 m)
- Position: Striker

Senior career*
Years	Team	Apps	(Gls)
2000–2001	Broadbridge Heath	35	(25)
2001–2002	Horsham	39	(32)
2002–2004	Aldershot Town	32	(5)
2003	→ Horsham (loan)	7	(4)
2003	→ Carshalton Athletic (loan)	7	(1)
2004	AFC Wimbledon	25	(10)
2004–2006	Horsham	96	(73)
2006–2007	Woking	11	(1)
2007–2008	Dagenham & Redbridge	15	(2)
2008	→ Grays Athletic (loan)	16	(9)
2008–2009	Grays Athletic	18	(3)
2009–2011	Eastbourne Borough	104	(35)
2011–2013	Lincoln City	65	(17)
2013–2014	Sutton United	39	(15)
2013–2014	→ Eastbourne Borough (loan)	5	(4)
2014–2016	Margate	34	(8)
2016	→ Eastbourne Borough (loan)	7	(3)
2016–2018	Eastbourne Borough	77	(23)
2018–2019	Three Bridges		
2019–23	Broadbridge Heath		
2023-2024	Horsham YMCA		
- * Club domestic league appearances and goals as of 21:00, 8 May 2018 (UTC)

Jamie Taylor (born 16 December 1982) is an English former footballer who most recently played for Horsham YM as a striker.

== Career ==
Born in Crawley, West Sussex, Taylor played for Broadbridge Heath, scoring 17 times during the 2000–01 season, before moving to Horsham at the start of the 2001–02 season. In November 2001 he scored 9 times in three matches, all within 12 days. He moved to Aldershot Town in August 2002.

He struggled to establish himself with Aldershot and had a number of loan spells with other clubs, including Horsham in February 2003, and Carshalton Athletic in December 2003, before being released in February 2004. He joined AFC Wimbledon in March 2004, helping them gain promotion to the Isthmian First Division, before returning to Horsham in October the same year.

In the 2006, Taylor joined Woking and in March 2007 he joined Dagenham & Redbridge. With Dagenham promoted to the football league at the end of the season, Taylor made his league debut on 18 August 2007 as a second-half substitute for Chris Moore in the 2–2 draw at home to Wycombe Wanderers.

On 22 February 2008, Taylor joined Grays Athletic on loan for a month, which was later extended until the end of the 2007–08 season. Taylor scored nine goals in 16 appearances for the Blues, finishing as second top goal scorer to Danny Kedwell.

Following his impressive loan spell at Grays Athletic, he was offered a two-year contract at the start of the 2008–09 season.

Taylor signed for fellow Conference National outfit Eastbourne Borough on 10 July 2009. He was voted the Supporters & Players' Player of the Year for the 2010–11 season. However, he turned down a new deal with the club following their drop in division.

Taylor signed for Lincoln City on a two-year deal on 1 July 2011. After an injury hit first season, Taylor helped the Imps survive in the Conference Premier in a difficult 2012–13 season, finishing as top scorer. At the end of his contract, Taylor left to return to his native South Coast.

In August 2018, he joined Three Bridges before, in January 2019, returning to Broadbridge Heath who he had first joined when just fifteen years old.

In November 2023, Taylor joined Horsham YMCA, making his debit in a Sussex Senior Cup draw against Bognor Regis Town on 7/11/23.
