= Mark Bradley (footballer, born 1988) =

Association football player

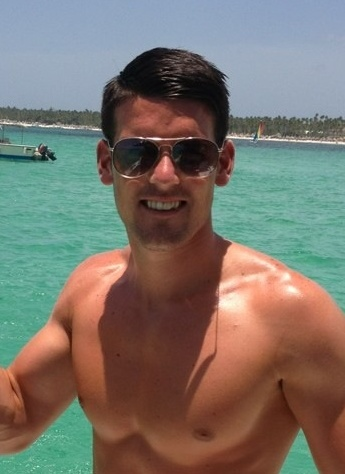
- Bradley in 2013

Personal information
- Full name: Mark Simon Bradley
- Date of birth: 14 January 1988 (age 38)
- Place of birth: Wordsley, England
- Height: 6 ft 0 in (1.83 m)
- Position: Defender

Team information
- Current team: Walsall (coach)

Senior career*
Years	Team	Apps	(Gls)
2005–2010	Walsall	95	(5)
2010–2015	Rotherham United	91	(4)
Total		186	(9)

International career
2007–2010	Wales U21	17	(1)
2010	Wales	1	(0)
- * Club domestic league appearances and goals

Mark Simon Bradley (born 14 January 1988) is a former professional footballer who played in the Football League for Walsall and Rotherham United. He made one appearance for the Wales national team in 2010. After retiring from professional football, Bradley moved to coaching and is currently employed as the strength and conditioning coach at his former club, Walsall.

== Club career ==
=== Walsall ===
Born in Wordsley, England, Bradley began his football career at Walsall and he progressed through the club's youth system. Bradley made his debut for Walsall, starting a match and played 57 minutes before being substituted, on the final day of the 2004–05 season in the match at home to Stockport County, losing 3–0. He spent two seasons, rotating between the first team and the reserve team to help with his development. The next two seasons saw Bradley signed a one–year contract extension with the club on two occasions. Following this, he was promoted to Walsall's first team ahead of the 2007–08 season.

Bradley made his first appearance of the 2007–08 season, coming against Leyton Orient on 18 August 2007 as a 67th-minute substitute, in a 1–0 loss. Following this, he began to receive a handful of first team football, playing in the midfield position. However, Bradley's performance received criticism from Walsall's supporters for his inconsistency, causing manager Richard Money to respond, pleading them to be patient with the player. Bradley scored his first career goal for the club, in 3–2 victory at Doncaster Rovers on 2 October 2007. This was followed up by scoring his second goal for Walsall, in a 4–0 victory at Huddersfield Town. Following this, his performance was praised by then captain Tommy Mooney, saying: "Bradders has got a chance of being a top player. You just hope he will continue to keep his head down and impress and while he is in the team people are looking at him. At the moment he needs to impress our manager and if he does that it makes it hard to drop him from the team." After missing two matches due to international commitment, Bradley scored his third goal for the club and set up a goal for Ishmel Demontagnac, in a 2–0 victory at Northampton Town on 24 November 2007. One day before the January transfer window, he, along with Troy Deeney and Anthony Gerrard, signed a new contract with Walsall, keeping them until 2010. However, during a 2–1 loss against Carlisle United on 2 February 2008, Bradley suffered ankle injury and was substituted in the 24th minute. After missing two matches, he returned to the starting line–up against Swindon Town on 23 February 2008 and set up a goal for Lee Holmes, who scored twice, in a 3–0 win. Bradley continued to remain involved in the first team for the rest of the 2007–08 season despite being sidelined on three occasions. At the end of the 2007–08 season, he went on to make thirty–seven appearances and scoring three times in all competitions. Following this, Bradley was named the club's young player of the year.

At the start of the 2008–09 season, Bradley found himself behind the pecking order in the first team, due to competitions in the midfield position and his own injury concerns. He found his playing time, mostly coming from the substitute bench, but at times, rotated in and out of the starting line–up in attempts to fight his way back. By January, Bradley regained his first team place, playing in the midfield position. On 17 March 2009, he scored his first goal of the season, in a 3–0 win against Brighton & Hove Albion. This was followed by scoring the only goal of the game, in a 1–0 win over Leyton Orient. At the end of the 2008–09 season, Bradley went on to make twenty–nine appearances and scoring two times in all competitions. Reflecting on the season, he said: "Personally the year has been frustrating and spoilt by my injuries. I haven't had a good run of games. I had a couple of ankle injuries earlier in the season and I have had a back problem. I am just disappointed with the number of games I have played, but hopefully I will get a lot more next year."

At the start of the 2009–10 season, Bradley continued to find himself behind the pecking order in the first team, due to competitions in the midfield position and found himself placed on the substitute bench, as well as, his international commitment. By–mid September, he regained his first team place, playing in the midfield position following the injury of Richard Taundry. However, his performance had come under criticism in a number of matches. Bradley later acknowledged his disappointment for not scoring goals, saying: "I feel I should have scored more, it's disappointing. I'm trying to get into positions in the box and hoping one is going to drop to me so I can put it away. But I've been working hard on other aspects of my game, which the gaffer wants me to do, like winning the second balls. I need to improve everywhere but if I can get some goals it always helps. I want to keep playing, if I play my form will come with that - then some goals will follow." By February, he found his playing time from the substitute bench for the rest of the 2009–10 season. Having aimed to play at least "30-35 games" in the 2009–10 season, Bradley barely made it, as he made thirty appearances in all competitions.

At the end of the 2009–10 season, Bradley was released by Walsall on 10 May 2010, along with six other players. Upon being released by the club, he said about the season: "They gave me a chance, but now I want to prove I am still a good player. I have to prove they have made a mistake. There's no point dwelling on it, I have got to move on and it will be good for me in the long term. It's disappointing but it will help me. It was 50-50, I was hoping for another year but I'm looking forward to something fresh. I had a good run in the team of about 21 games and then went away with Wales which was the biggest thing in my career, but came out of the team at Walsall and hardly playing the last 20 games killed me. Not playing gave them something to say."

=== Rotherham United ===
On 7 July 2010, Bradley joined League Two side Rotherham United on a two-year contract after Ronnie Moore confirmed his interests signing him.

He made his debut for the club, coming on as a 76th-minute substitute, in a 2–1 win over Lincoln City in the opening game of the season. Bradley then scored his first goal for Rotherham United, in a 2–1 win against Burton Albion in the second round of the Football League Trophy. After the match, his goal was nominated for the Football League Trophy's Ultimate Finish Award. Since joining the club, however, Bradley struggled to fight for his place in the first team, due to competition and his own injury concern, leading to find his playing time, coming from the substitute bench. By October, he made a total of seven starts for Rotherham United for the next months. With sixteen appearances made so far, Bradley was expected to be loaned out, due to strong competitions in the midfield position at the first team, but it never happened. By March, he received a handful of first team football for the club, making seven appearances. In the last game of the season, Bradley provided an assist for Ryan Taylor in a 3–1 win over Torquay United. At the end of the 2010–11 season, he went on to twenty–four appearances and scoring once in all competitions. Shortly after, Rotherham United placed Bradley on the transfer list. Manager Andy Scott explained his actions on selling Bradley, stating that he's keen to sell him in the summer.

Despite being placed on a transfer list, Bradley was featured in Rotherham United's pre–season friendly matches. Having sat out on the substitute bench for the first four matches of the 2011–12 season, he made his first appearance of the season, starting the whole game, in a 2–2 draw against Barnet on 20 August 2011. Bradley made in the next two matches before suffering a hamstring injury that kept him out for weeks. On 24 September 2011, he made his return to the first team, coming on as a 67th-minute substitute, in a 4–0 loss against Southend United. However, his return was short–lived when Bradley suffered a dislocated shoulder against Sheffield United in the Football League Trophy and was substituted in the 64th minute, as the club lost 2–1. After the match, it was announced that he would be out for four months after undergoing a surgery. While on the sidelines, manager Scott praised Bradley for working his way to the first team, having been prepared to sell him in the summer. By January, he made his return to training, having recovered from a shoulder injury earlier than expected. After appearing twice on the substitute bench being unused, Bradley made his return from injury, where he scored an own-goal in a 3–2 loss against Dagenham & Redbridge on 28 January 2012. This was followed up by helping Rotherham United two clean sheets in the next two matches. Manager Scott said that he's planning to use Bradley and began using him in the right–back position. On 20 March 2012, he scored his first goal for the club in a 4–2 victory over Macclesfield Town. At the end of the 2011–12 season, Bradley went on to make twenty–two appearances and scoring two times in all competitions.

Ahead of the 2012–13 season, Bradley switched number shirts from 15 to 14. At the start of the 2012–13 season, he started the whole game against Hull City in the first round of the League Cup and missed the decisive penalty in a shoot-out, allowing the opposition team to go through to the next round after the match was played all the way to penalty shoot-out. Bradley then started in the next three league matches, playing in the right–back position. However, he suffered a hamstring injury during a 1–0 loss against York City in the first round of the Football League Trophy and was substituted in the 23rd minute. After the match, Rotherham United announced on their website that Bradley would be out for six weeks. But he made a recovery quicker than expected and made his return to the starting line–up against Barnet on 22 September 2012, helping the club keep a clean sheet, in a 0–0 draw. Following his return from injury, Bradley regained his first team place, playing in the right–back position, under new manager Steve Evans, who started as the club's manager in April succeeding Andy Scott, just one month left until the end of the season. On 3 November 2012, he scored his first goal of the season, in a 3–2 win over Stevenage In the first round of FA Cup. Two weeks later on 20 November 2012, Bradley scored his second goal of the season, in a 3–2 loss against Wycombe Wanderers. After missing a match, due to a groin injury, he scored on his return, in the FA Cup in a second round replay match win over Notts County after a draw earlier. However, Bradley suffered a small fracture of the foot that saw him miss four matches. On 6 April 2013, he returned to the starting line–up from injury against Morecambe and played 75 minutes before being substituted, due to an injury. Following this, it was announced that Bradley was sidelined for the rest of the 2012–13 season. His contributions to Rotherham United saw the club promoted from League Two. At the end of the 2012–13 season, he went on to make thirty–three appearances and scoring three times in all competitions. Following this, Bradley was offered and accepted a new contract by Rotherham United.

At the start of the 2013–14 season, Bradley found himself in the competitions with Richard Brindley over first-choice right-back position. As a result, he found himself rotating in and out of the starting line–up over the position, due to competition and his own injury concern. Bradley scored his first goal of the season, on 5 October 2013, with a header in the first half, in a 1–0 win over Brentford. However, he suffered a groin injury that kept him out for a month. On 7 December 2013, Bradley made his return from injury, starting the whole game, in a 2–1 loss against Rochdale. Following his return from injury, he continued to regain his first team place in the right–back position despite the arrival of James Tavernier and facing his own injury concern. Because of the competitions that Bradley faced, he played in different positions, playing either the defender or midfield positions. Bradley then scored his second goal of the season on 11 March 2014, but then twisted his knee and was substituted, as Rotherham United beat Oldham Athletic. After the match, Manager Steven Evans remained optimistic that Bradley's injury wasn't serious. However, it was announced that Bradley would be out for the rest of the 2013–14 season. While on the sidelines, he watched as the club beat Leyton Orient 4–3 on penalties following a 2–2 draw throughout 120 minutes, a win that saw Rotherham United promoted to the Championship. At the end of the 2013–14 season, Bradley made twenty–eight appearances and scoring two times in all competitions. Following this, Bradley was offered a new contract for a new season, which he accepted.

However, in the 2014–15 season Bradley made no single appearance for the club in all competitions throughout the season due to his failure to recover from injury. As a result, Manager Steve Evans was keen to loan out Bradley to get first team experience, but this never happened, due to his recovering from his injury. At the end of the 2014–15 season, Bradley was one of five players released, later retiring through injury.

== Post-playing career ==
After his retirement from playing, Bradley spent two years out of the professional game, spending his time taking sports science degree and working as a personal trainer. He eventually graduated with a degree. In May 2017, Bradley re-joined Walsall as their strength and conditioning coach. Two years later, he was promoted as the club's first team strength and conditioning coach role. On 28 June 2021, Bradley left Walsall after spending four years at the club's coaching staff.

== International career ==
Although Bradley was born in Wordsley, England, he was eligible to play Wales through his grandmother, who was from Swansea. Having represented Wales U19, Bradley was called up to the Wales U21 for the first time in February 2007. He made his U21 national team debut, coming on as a substitute, in a 4–0 win against Northern Ireland on 6 February 2007. Bradley then scored his first goal for Wales U21, in a 4–2 win against France U21 on 20 November 2007. He became a regular for the U21 national team, playing in different defender and midfield positions for the next three years. After making his senior team debut, Bradley appeared three more matches for Wales U21 by the end of the year. Following this, he made seventeen appearances and scoring once for the U21 national team.

Bradley was called into the senior national squad for the FIFA World Cup qualifier against Liechtenstein on 14 October 2009. However, he appeared as an unused substitute, as Wales won 2–0. In May 2010, Bradley was called up to the Wales squad once again. Bradley finally made his debut for the Wales national football team on 23 May 2010 against Croatia at the Stadion Gradski, as the Red Dragons lost 2–0, in what turned out to be his only appearance.

== Career statistics ==
Appearances and goals by club, season and competition
Club	Season	League			FA Cup		League Cup		Other		Total	
Club	Season	Division	Apps	Goals	Apps	Goals	Apps	Goals	Apps	Goals	Apps	Goals
Walsall	2004–05	League One	1	0	0	0	0	0	0	0	1	0
Walsall	2005–06	League One	2	0	0	0	0	0	1	0	3	0
Walsall	2006–07	League Two	1	0	0	0	0	0	0	0	1	0
Walsall	2007–08	League One	35	3	5	0	0	0	0	0	40	3
Walsall	2008–09	League One	28	2	1	0	0	0	0	0	29	2
Walsall	2009–10	League One	28	0	0	0	0	0	0	0	28	0
Walsall	Total		95	5	6	0	0	0	1	0	102	5
Rotherham United	2010–11	League Two	21	0	1	0	0	0	2	1	24	1
Rotherham United	2011–12	League Two	21	1	0	0	0	0	1	0	22	1
Rotherham United	2012–13	League Two	27	1	4	2	1	0	1	0	33	3
Rotherham United	2013–14	League One	22	2	2	0	2	0	2	0	28	2
Rotherham United	Total		91	4	7	2	3	0	6	1	107	7
Career total			186	9	13	2	3	0	7	1	209	12
