= 2008–09 Bury F.C. season =

Bury F.C.
2008–09 season
- Manager: Alan Knill
- Football League Two: 4th
- FA Cup: First Round
- League Cup: First Round
- Football League Trophy: North Quarter Final

This article documents the 2008–09 season of Lancashire football club Bury F.C.

== League table ==
Pos	Team	Pld	W	D	L	GF	GA	GD	Pts	Promotion, qualification or relegation
2	Exeter City (P)	46	22	13	11	65	50	+15	79	Promotion to Football League One
3	Wycombe Wanderers (P)	46	20	18	8	54	33	+21	78	Promotion to Football League One
4	Bury	46	21	15	10	63	43	+20	78	Qualification for League Two play-offs
5	Gillingham (O, P)	46	21	12	13	58	55	+3	75	Qualification for League Two play-offs
6	Rochdale	46	19	13	14	70	59	+11	70	Qualification for League Two play-offs

Source: The Football League
Rules for classification: 1) points; 2) goal difference; 3) number of goals scored.
(O) Play-off winners; (P) Promoted

== Results ==
=== League Two ===
9 August 2008 1	Bury	1–0	Brentford	Bury
	Bishop 43'			Stadium: Gigg Lane; Attendance: 2,819

16 August 2008 2	Chesterfield	1–3	Bury	Chesterfield
	Kerry 16'		Futcher 4'; Sodje 27'; Morrell 40'	Stadium: Saltergate; Attendance: 3,728

23 August 2008 3	Bury	2–1	Morecambe	Bury
	Scott 19'; Artell 30' (o.g.)		Howe 14'	Stadium: Gigg Lane; Attendance: 2,679

30 August 2008 4	Rochdale	1–1	Bury	Rochdale
	Le Fondre 68' (pen.)		Russell 8' (o.g.)	Stadium: Spotland; Attendance: 5,492

6 September 2008 5	Chester City	1–1	Bury	Chester
	Mozika 38'		Bishop 49' (pen.)	Stadium: Deva Stadium; Attendance: 2,327

13 September 2008 6	Bury	3–1	Lincoln City	Bury
	Morrell 30'; Sodje 50'; Bishop 66' (pen.)		Buchanan 37' (o.g.)	Stadium: Gigg Lane; Attendance: 2,663

20 September 2008 7	Barnet	1–2	Bury	London
	Adomah 49'		Bishop 75'; Morrell 82'	Stadium: Underhill; Attendance: 1,995

27 September 2008 8	Bury	0–0	Wycombe Wanderers	Bury
				Stadium: Gigg Lane; Attendance: 3,597

4 October 2008 9	Aldershot Town	3–3	Bury	Aldershot
	Elvins 69'; Davies 77' (pen.); Hylton 79'		Bishop 24', 57'; Scott 30'	Stadium: EBB Stadium; Attendance: 3,621

11 October 2008 10	Bury	0–1	Exeter City	Bury
			Logan 7'	Stadium: Gigg Lane; Attendance: 3,220

18 October 2008 11	Dagenham & Redbridge	1–3	Bury	London
	Saunders 90'		Dawson 32'; Jones 36'; Bennett 82'	Stadium: Victoria Road; Attendance: 2,364

21 October 2008 12	Bury	1–2	Rotherham United	Bury
	Scott 30'		Reid 2'; Broughton 11'	Stadium: Gigg Lane; Attendance: 2,362

25 October 2008 13	Bury	1–2	Luton Town	Bury
	Bishop 53' (pen.)		Craddock 35'; Roper 44'	Stadium: Gigg Lane; Attendance: 3,052

28 October 2008 14	Bradford City	1–0	Bury	Bradford
	Conlon 86'			Stadium: Coral Windows Stadium; Attendance: 12,830

1 November 2008 15	Notts County	0–1	Bury	Nottingham
			Cresswell 79'	Stadium: Meadow Lane; Attendance: 4,391

15 November 2008 16	Bury	0–2	Grimsby Town	Bury
			Trotter 17'; Jarman 22'; Kalala (red card) 36'	Stadium: Gigg Lane; Attendance: 2,549

22 November 2008 17	Bury	4–0	Gillingham	Bury
	Bishop 9', 59'; Hurst 40', 63'			Stadium: Gigg Lane; Attendance: 2,068

29 November 2008 18	Accrington Stanley	1–2	Bury	Accrington
	Clarke 79' (pen.)		Jones 35'; Barry-Murphy 38'	Stadium: Crown Ground; Attendance: 2,093

6 December 2008 19	Macclesfield Town	1–1	Bury	Macclesfield
	Gritton 6'; Flynn (red card) 74'		Dawson 8'	Stadium: Moss Rose; Attendance: 2,431

13 December 2008 20	Bury	3–0	Port Vale	Bury
	Futcher 2'; Hurst 11', 45'			Stadium: Gigg Lane; Attendance: 2,651

20 December 2008 21	Bournemouth	2–0	Bury	Bournemouth
	Igoe 39'; Partington 44'			Stadium: Fitness First Stadium; Attendance: 3,479

26 December 2008 22	Bury	2–2	Darlington	Bury
	Brown 31' (o.g.); Bishop 55' (pen.)		Miller 44'; Foran 72'	Stadium: Gigg Lane; Attendance: 3,454

28 December 2008 23	Shrewsbury Town	1–0	Bury	Shrewsbury
	Holt 76'		Sodje (red card) 38'	Stadium: Prostar Stadium; Attendance: 7,127

3 January 2009 24	Wycombe Wanderers	2–1	Bury	High Wycombe
	Harrold 37'; Balanta 63'		Williamson 90' (o.g.)	Stadium: Adams Park; Attendance: 4,961

10 January 2009 25	Bury	1–0	Barnet	Bury
	Jones 37'			Stadium: Gigg Lane; Attendance: 2,402

17 January 2009 26	Exeter City	0–0	Bury	Exeter
				Stadium: St James Park; Attendance: 4,158

24 January 2009 27	Bury	2–1	Aldershot Town	Bury
	Barry-Murphy 41'; Morrell 45'		Davies 83'	Stadium: Gigg Lane; Attendance: 2,558

27 January 2009 28	Bury	1–0	Bradford City	Bury
	Morrell 76'			Stadium: Gigg Lane; Attendance: 4,112

31 January 2009 29	Luton Town	1–2	Bury	Luton
	Hall 36'		Bishop 59'; Morrell 66'	Stadium: Kenilworth Road; Attendance: 5,545

7 February 2009 30	Bury	2–2	Dagenham & Redbridge	Bury
	Sodje 28', 33'		Nurse 60'; Benson 64'	Stadium: Gigg Lane; Attendance: 2,530

14 February 2009 31	Grimsby Town	1–2	Bury	Grimsby
	Proudlock 31'		Bishop 55'; Morrell 65'	Stadium: Blundell Park; Attendance: 3,673

21 February 2009 32	Bury	2–0	Notts County	Bury
	Bishop 40'; Sodje 84'			Stadium: Gigg Lane; Attendance: 2,810

28 February 2009 33	Brentford	1–0	Bury	London
	Bean 39'		Dawson (red card) 70'	Stadium: Griffin Park; Attendance: 6,597

3 March 2009 34	Bury	1–2	Chesterfield	Bury
	Bishop 60' (pen.)		Downes 2'; Lester 40'; Robertson (red card) 42'	Stadium: Gigg Lane; Attendance: 2,077

7 March 2009 35	Bury	2–1	Rochdale	Bury
	Bennett 19'; Jones 84'		Buckley 90'	Stadium: Gigg Lane; Attendance: 7,589

10 March 2009 36	Morecambe	0–0	Bury	Morecambe
				Stadium: Christie Park; Attendance: 2,165

14 March 2009 37	Lincoln City	1–1	Bury	Lincoln
	Wright 30'; Elding (red card) 45'		Bishop 82'	Stadium: Sincil Bank; Attendance: 3,642

21 March 2009 38	Bury	1–1	Chester City	Bury
	Morrell 45'; Cresswell (red card) 47'		Lowe 90'	Stadium: Gigg Lane; Attendance: 3,049

24 March 2009 39	Rotherham United	1–1	Bury	Sheffield
	Reid 83' (pen.)		Sodje 90'	Stadium: Don Valley Stadium; Attendance: 2,890

28 March 2009 40	Bury	1–0	Bournemouth	Bury
	Morrell 55'			Stadium: Gigg Lane; Attendance: 2,762

4 April 2009 41	Port Vale	1–1	Bury	Stoke on Trent
	Lawrie 57'		Bennett 68'	Stadium: Vale Park; Attendance: 5,763

10 April 2009 42	Bury	2–1	Shrewsbury Town	Bury
	Jevons 54' (pen.); Hurst 80'		Chadwick 55'	Stadium: Gigg Lane; Attendance: 4,850

13 April 2009 43	Darlington	2–2	Bury	Darlington
	Kennedy 38'; Abbott 74'		Hurst 8'; Sodje 53'	Stadium: The Darlington Arena; Attendance: 2,927

18 April 2009 44	Bury	3–0	Macclesfield Town	Bury
	Bishop 4'; Hurst 57', 75'			Stadium: Gigg Lane; Attendance: 3,499

25 April 2009 45	Gillingham	0–0	Bury	Gillingham
				Stadium: Priestfield; Attendance: 8,360

2 May 2009 46	Bury	1–0	Accrington Stanley	Bury
	Jevons 90' (pen.)			Stadium: Gigg Lane; Attendance: 7,515

=== FA Cup ===
8 November 2008 Round 1	Bury	0–1	Gillingham	Bury
			Barcham 71'	Stadium: Gigg Lane; Attendance: 2,161

=== League Cup ===
12 August 2008 Round 1	Bury	0–2	Burnley	Bury
			Paterson 40', 90'	Stadium: Gigg Lane; Attendance: 4,276

=== Football League Trophy ===
7 October 2008 Round 2 Northern Section	Bury	1–0	Stockport County	Bury
	Bishop 77'			Stadium: Gigg Lane; Attendance: 2,384

4 November 2008 Quarter Final Northern Section	Darlington	1–0	Bury	Darlington
	White 53'			Stadium: The Darlington Arena; Attendance: 1,651

=== Football League play-offs ===
7 May 2009 Semi Final First Leg	Shrewsbury Town	0–1	Bury	Shrewsbury
			Ashton 81' (o.g)	Stadium: Prostar Stadium; Attendance: 8,429

10 May 2009 Semi Final Second Leg	Bury	0–1 (a.e.t.) (3–4 p)	Shrewsbury Town	Bury
			McIntyre 88'	Stadium: Gigg Lane; Attendance: 7,673

== Players ==
=== First-team squad ===
Includes all players who were awarded squad numbers during the season.

Note: Flags indicate national team as defined under FIFA eligibility rules; some limited exceptions apply. Players may hold more than one non-FIFA nationality.

No.	Pos.	Nation	Player
1	GK	(England) ENG	Wayne Brown
2	DF	(England) ENG	Paul Scott
3	DF	(Northern Ireland) NIR	David Buchanan
4	DF	(England) ENG	Steve Haslam
5	DF	(England) ENG	Ben Futcher
6	MF	(England) ENG	Ryan Cresswell
7	MF	(Republic of Ireland) IRL	Stephen Dawson
8	MF	(England) ENG	Richie Baker
9	FW	(South Africa) RSA	Glynn Hurst
10	FW	(England) ENG	Andy Bishop
11	MF	(Republic of Ireland) IRL	Brian Barry-Murphy
12	DF	(England) ENG	Danny Racchi

No.	Pos.	Nation	Player
14	MF	(England) ENG	Mike Jones
16	DF	(Nigeria) NGA	Efe Sodje
17	DF	(England) ENG	Ricky Anane
18	FW	(England) ENG	Andy Morrell
19	MF	(England) ENG	Jack Dorney
20	GK	(Wales) WAL	Cameron Belford
21	GK	(England) ENG	Domaine Rouse
22	FW	(England) ENG	Phil Jevons (on loan from Huddersfield Town)
23	MF	(England) ENG	Elliott Bennett (on loan from Wolverhampton Wanderers)
24	MF	(England) ENG	John Welsh (on loan from Hull City)

=== Left club during season ===
Note: Flags indicate national team as defined under FIFA eligibility rules; some limited exceptions apply. Players may hold more than one non-FIFA nationality.

No.	Pos.	Nation	Player
15	MF	(England) ENG	Chris O'Grady
15	FW	(England) ENG	Dean Howell
25	GK	(England) ENG	Mark Tyler
