= 2007–08 Bury F.C. season =

Bury F.C.
2007–08 season
- Manager: Chris Casper Until 14 January 2008 Alan Knill From 5 February 2008
- Football League Two: 13th
- FA Cup: Fourth round
- League Cup: First round
- Football League Trophy: Northern Semi Final

This article documents the 2007–08 season of Lancashire football club Bury F.C.

== League table ==
Pos	Team	Pld	W	D	L	GF	GA	GD	Pts
11	Morecambe	46	16	12	18	59	63	−4	60
12	Barnet	46	16	12	18	56	63	−7	60
13	Bury	46	16	11	19	58	61	−3	59
14	Brentford	46	17	8	21	52	70	−18	59
15	Lincoln City	46	18	4	24	61	77	−16	58

Updated to match(es) played on 3 May 2008. Source: The Football League
Rules for classification: 1) points; 2) goal difference; 3) number of goals scored.

== Results ==
=== League Two ===
11 August 2007 1	Milton Keynes Dons	1–2	Bury	Milton Keynes
	Andrews 21'; Diallo (red card) 57'		Bishop 51', 58' (pen.)	Stadium: Stadium:MK; Attendance: 7,740

18 August 2007 2	Bury	1–1	Grimsby Town	Bury
	Parrish 71'		Bolland 10'	Stadium: Gigg Lane; Attendance: 2,493

25 August 2007 3	Wycombe Wanderers	1–0	Bury	High Wycombe
	Torres 70'			Stadium: Adams Park; Attendance: 4,067

1 September 2007 4	Bury	1–2	Brentford	Bury
	Bishop 46'		Poole 21'; Shakes 84'	Stadium: Gigg Lane; Attendance: 2,301

7 September 2007 5	Chesterfield	3–1	Bury	Chesterfield
	Fletcher 33', 77'; Lester 84'		Woodthorpe 75'	Stadium: Saltergate; Attendance: 4,161

15 September 2007 6	Bury	0–2	Chester City	Bury
			Butler 32'; Hughes 52'	Stadium: Gigg Lane; Attendance: 2,539

22 September 2007 7	Dagenham & Redbridge	1–1	Bury	London
	Rainford 39'		Scott 21'	Stadium: Victoria Road; Attendance: 1,597

29 September 2007 8	Bury	2–1	Accrington Stanley	Bury
	Mangan 71'; Adams 84'		Mullin 46'	Stadium: Gigg Lane; Attendance: 2,784

2 October 2007 9	Bury	1–1	Lincoln City	Bury
	Scott 24'		Kerr 19'	Stadium: Gigg Lane; Attendance: 1,690

6 October 2007 10	Rochdale	1–2	Bury	Rochdale
	McArdle 61'		Mangan 2'; Adams 12'	Stadium: Spotland; Attendance: 4,692

13 October 2007 11	Notts County	1–3	Bury	Nottingham
	MacKenzie 64' (pen.)		Haslam 35'; Scott; Adams 90' (pen.)	Stadium: Meadow Lane; Attendance: 3,710

20 October 2007 12	Bury	1–1	Shrewsbury Town	Bury
	Scott 45'		Drummond 82'	Stadium: Gigg Lane; Attendance: 2,667

27 October 2007 13	Macclesfield Town	2–2	Bury	Macclesfield
	Thomas 21'; Gritton 45'		Mangan 49'; Adams 64' (pen.)	Stadium: Moss Rose; Attendance: 2,672

3 November 2007 14	Bury	3–0	Barnet	Bury
	Hurst 31'; Adams 54', 86'			Stadium: Gigg Lane; Attendance: 2,121

6 November 2007 15	Rotherham United	2–1	Bury	Rotherham
	Newsham 22'; O'Grady 55'		Adams 43' (pen.)	Stadium: Millmoor; Attendance: 3,425

17 November 2007 16	Bury	2–0	Peterborough United	Bury
	Baker 32'; Mangan 84'			Stadium: Gigg Lane; Attendance: 2,660

24 November 2007 17	Morecambe	2–1	Bury	Morecambe
	Bentley 11'; Twiss 27'		Bishop 76'	Stadium: Christie Park; Attendance: 3,124

4 December 2007 18	Bury	0–1	Wrexham	Bury
			Williams 31'	Stadium: Gigg Lane; Attendance: 2,248

15 December 2007 19	Bury	0–1	Hereford United	Bury
			Robinson 90'	Stadium: Gigg Lane; Attendance: 2,099

22 December 2007 20	Chester City	2–1	Bury	Chester
	Hughes 45'; Ellison 79'		Bishop 16' (red card) 66'	Stadium: Deva Stadium; Attendance: 2,260

26 December 2007 21	Bury	0–1	Chesterfield	Bury
	Scott (red card) 79'		Leven 45' (pen.)	Stadium: Gigg Lane; Attendance: 3,158

29 December 2007 22	Bury	0–2	Dagenham & Redbridge	Bury
			Strevens 21', 62'	Stadium: Gigg Lane; Attendance: 1,887

1 January 2008 23	Lincoln City	1–1	Bury	Lincoln
	Dodds 79'		Bishop 85'	Stadium: Sincil Bank; Attendance: 3,327

12 January 2008 24	Darlington	3–0	Bury	Darlington
	Wright 12'; Miller 22'; Mayo 58'			Stadium: The Darlington Arena; Attendance: 3,003

22 January 2008 25	Bury	2–2	Bradford City	Bury
	Bishop 57'; Stephens 88'		Conlon 45' (pen.); Nix 79'	Stadium: Gigg Lane; Attendance: 2,776

29 January 2008 26	Grimsby Town	1–0	Bury	Grimsby
	Clarke 40'			Stadium: Blundell Park; Attendance: 3,445

2 February 2008 27	Bury	1–5	Milton Keynes Dons	Bury
	Hurst 89'		Wright 10', 36', 68'; Dyer 23'; Gallen 81'	Stadium: Gigg Lane; Attendance: 2,241

5 February 2008 28	Bury	2–3	Stockport County	Bury
	Bishop 13'; Hurst 48'		Pilkington 7', 58'; Taylor 52'	Stadium: Gigg Lane; Attendance: 3,142

9 February 2008 29	Bradford City	1–2	Bury	Bradford
	Thorne 23'		Bishop 56' (pen.), 89'	Stadium: Coral Windows Stadium; Attendance: 13,844

12 February 2008 30	Bury	2–2	Wycombe Wanderers	Bury
	Bishop 65' (pen.); Barry-Murphy 88'		Torres 14'; McGleish 39' (pen.)	Stadium: Gigg Lane; Attendance: 1,895

16 February 2008 31	Stockport County	1–2	Bury	Stockport
	Randolph 21' (o.g.); Logan (red card) 42'		Scott 71'; Adams 79'	Stadium: Edgeley Park; Attendance: 5,704

23 February 2008 32	Bury	1–2	Darlington	Bury
	Sodje 88'		Ndumbu-Nsungu 6' (pen.); Cummins 67'	Stadium: Gigg Lane; Attendance: 2,554

26 February 2008 33	Mansfield Town	1–1	Bury	Mansfield
	Buxton 56'		Rooney 84'	Stadium: Field Mill; Attendance: 1,923

1 March 2008 34	Peterborough United	1–0	Bury	Peterborough
	Keates 59'			Stadium: London Road; Attendance: 6,150

4 March 2008 35	Brentford	1–4	Bury	London
	Poole 56' (pen.)		Adams 13'; Hurst 15'; Bishop 37', 83'	Stadium: Griffin Park; Attendance: 3,333

8 March 2008 36	Bury	2–1	Morecambe	Bury
	Bishop 45', 49' (pen.)		Drummond 53'	Stadium: Gigg Lane; Attendance: 2,596

11 March 2008 37	Bury	3–0	Darlington	Bury
	Bishop 16', 62'; Adams 66'			Stadium: Gigg Lane; Attendance: 1,957

15 March 2008 38	Wrexham	2–1	Bury	Wrexham
	Broughton 25'; Proctor 77'		Hurst 45'	Stadium: Racecourse Ground; Attendance: 4,431

22 March 2008 39	Hereford United	0–0	Bury	Hereford
				Stadium: Edgar Street; Attendance: 3,420

24 March 2008 40	Bury	2–0	Mansfield Town	Bury
	Scott 10'; Rooney 37'			Stadium: Gigg Lane; Attendance: 2,779

29 March 2008 41	Shrewsbury Town	0–1	Bury	Shrewsbury
			Adams 71'	Stadium: New Meadow; Attendance: 5,213

5 April 2008 42	Bury	2–1	Notts County	Bury
	Rooney 18'; Hurst 87'		Crow 71'	Stadium: Gigg Lane; Attendance: 2,463

12 April 2008 43	Barnet	3–0	Bury	Barnet
	Birchall 57', 70'; Akurang 84'			Stadium: Underhill; Attendance: 3,054

19 April 2008 44	Bury	1–0	Macclesfield Town	Bury
	Bennett 43'			Stadium: Gigg Lane; Attendance: 2,506

26 April 2008 45	Bury	1–1	Rochdale	Bury
	Adams 56'; Futcher (red card) 78'		Le Fondre 90' (pen.)	Stadium: Gigg Lane; Attendance: 6,271

3 May 2008 46	Accrington Stanley	0–2	Bury	Accrington
			Bishop 22' (pen.), 45'	Stadium: Crown Ground; Attendance: 2,566

=== FA Cup ===
10 November 2007 Round 1	Bury	4–1	Workington	Bury
	Scott 22'; Bishop 80', 85', 90'		Berkeley 75'	Stadium: Gigg Lane; Attendance: 2,641

1 December 2007 Round 2	Bury	1–0	Exeter City	Bury
	Adams 79'			Stadium: Gigg Lane; Attendance: 2,725

5 January 2008 Round 3	Norwich City	1–1	Bury	Norwich
	Doherty 80'		Bishop 71'	Stadium: Carrow Road; Attendance: 19,815

15 January 2008 Round 3 replay	Bury	2–1	Norwich City	Bury
	Futcher 18'; Bishop 61'		Dublin 86'	Stadium: Gigg Lane; Attendance: 4,146

26 January 2008 Round 4	Southampton	2–0	Bury	Southampton
	Surman 71'; Rasiak 80'			Stadium: St Mary's; Attendance: 25,449

=== League Cup ===
14 August 2007 Round 1	Bury	0–1	Carlisle United	Bury
			Graham 12'	Stadium: Gigg Lane; Attendance: 2,213

=== Football League Trophy ===
9 October 2007 Round 2 Northern Section	Rochdale	1–3	Bury	Bury
	Prendergast 45'		Hurst 57', 84'; Rouse 82'	Stadium: Gigg Lane; Attendance: 2,376

13 November 2007 Quarter Final Northern Section	Leeds United	1–2	Bury	Leeds
	Constantine 4' da Costa (red card) 42'		Futcher 24'; Bishop 29'	Stadium: Elland Road; Attendance: 18,809

8 January 2008 Semi Final Northern Section	Morecambe	2–0	Bury	Morecambe
	Blinkhorn 10'; Newby 90'			Stadium: Christie Park; Attendance: 2,434

== Players ==
=== First-team squad ===
Includes all players who were awarded squad numbers during the season.

Note: Flags indicate national team as defined under FIFA eligibility rules; some limited exceptions apply. Players may hold more than one non-FIFA nationality.

No.	Pos.	Nation	Player
1	GK	ENG	Jim Provett
2	MF	ENG	Paul Scott
3	DF	ENG	Colin Woodthorpe
4	DF	ENG	Ben Futcher
5	DF	ENG	Dave Challinor
6	DF	NIR	Paul Morgan
7	DF	ENG	Steve Haslam
8	MF	ENG	Richie Baker
9	FW	ENG	Glynn Hurst
10	FW	ENG	Andy Bishop
11	MF	IRL	Brian Barry-Murphy
12	MF	ENG	David Buchanan
14	DF	ENG	Andy Parrish
15	MF	ENG	Ben Leonard
16	MF	WAL	Nicky Adams
17	FW	ENG	Jordan Stepien

No.	Pos.	Nation	Player
18	MF	ENG	Dale Stephens
19	FW	ENG	Andy Mangan
21	GK	ENG	Aaron Grundy
22	FW	ENG	Domaine Rouse
23	MF	ENG	Elliott Bennett (on loan from Wolverhampton Wanderers)
24	MF	ENG	Jack Dorney
25	FW	IRL	Adam Rooney (on loan from Stoke City)
26	DF	ENG	Ricky Anane
27	MF	ENG	Ashley Young
28	DF	NGA	Efe Sodje (on loan from Gillingham)
30	GK	ENG	Cameron Belford
31	GK	ENG	Michael Smith
33	DF	ENG	Dominic Taylor
34	FW	ENG	Simon Yeo (on loan from Chester City)

=== Left club during season ===
Note: Flags indicate national team as defined under FIFA eligibility rules; some limited exceptions apply. Players may hold more than one non-FIFA nationality.

No.	Pos.	Nation	Player
25	FW	ENG	Marcus Richardson
32	DF	ENG	Tom Sharpe (returned to parent club Nottingham Forest following loan spell)
25	MF	ENG	Lee Bullock (returned to parent club Hartlepool United following loan spell)
29	MF	ENG	Sean McAllister (returned to parent club Sheffield Wednesday following loan spell)

No.	Pos.	Nation	Player
28	MF	ENG	Liam Hughes (returned to parent club Wolverhampton Wanderers following loan spell)
20	FW	ENG	James Dean
29	GK	IRL	Darren Randolph (returned to parent club Charlton Athletic following loan spell)
