= 2009–10 Bury F.C. season =

Bury F.C.
2009–10 season
- Manager: Alan Knill
- Stadium: Gigg Lane
- Football League Two: 9th
- FA Cup: First round
- League Cup: First round
- Football League Trophy: North quarter-final

During the 2009–10 season, Bury competed in the fourth tier of English football, Football League Two.

== League table ==
Pos	Team	Pld	W	D	L	GF	GA	GD	Pts	Promotion, qualification or relegation
7	Dagenham & Redbridge (O, P)	46	20	12	14	69	58	+11	72	Qualification to League Two play-offs
8	Chesterfield	46	21	7	18	61	62	−1	70	
9	Bury	46	19	12	15	54	59	−5	69	
10	Port Vale	46	17	17	12	61	50	+11	68	
11	Northampton Town	46	18	13	15	62	53	+9	67	

Updated to match(es) played on unknown. Source: football-league.co.uk
(O) Play-off winners; (P) Promoted

== Results ==
=== League Two ===
8 August 2009 1	Bury	0–3	Bournemouth	Bury
			Pitman 17'; Fletcher 39'; Molesley 50'	Stadium: Gigg Lane; Attendance: 2,998

15 August 2009 2	Darlington	0–1	Bury	Darlington
			Robertson 59'	Stadium: The Darlington Arena; Attendance: 2,310

18 August 2009 3	Hereford United	1–3	Bury	Hereford
	Constantine 15'; Valentine (red card) 88'		Jones 10'; Lowe 53', 86'	Stadium: Edgar Street; Attendance: 2,321

22 August 2009 4	Bury	0–1	Grimsby Town	Bury
			Conlon 20'	Stadium: Gigg Lane; Attendance: 2,799

29 August 2009 5	Rochdale	3–0	Bury	Rochdale
	Thompson 30'; Dagnall 73'Kennedy 81' (pen.)			Stadium: Spotland; Attendance: 4,534

5 September 2009 6	Bury	0–2	Accrington Stanley	Bury
			Grant 83', 85'	Stadium: Gigg Lane; Attendance: 3,082

12 September 2009 7	Bury	0–1	Cheltenham Town	Bury
			Hayles 90'	Stadium: Gigg Lane; Attendance: 2,130

19 September 2009 8	Port Vale	0–1	Bury	Stoke on Trent
			Lowe 8'	Stadium: Vale Park; Attendance: 5,461

26 September 2009 9	Bury	2–0	Lincoln City	Bury
	Lowe 85'; Worrall 90'			Stadium: Gigg Lane; Attendance: 2,554

29 September 2009 10	Crewe Alexandra	2–3	Bury	Crewe
	Worley 39'; Zola 73'; Jones (red card) 85'; Ada (red card) 90'		Elliott 22'; Lowe 41'; Dawson 86' (pen.)	Stadium: Gresty Road; Attendance: 3,534

3 October 2009 11	Torquay United	1–1	Bury	Torquay
	Benyon 59'		Jones 38'	Stadium: Plainmoor; Attendance: 2,524

10 October 2009 12	Bury	2–2	Northampton Town	Bury
	Worrall 29'; Lowe 33'		Hinton 66'; Akinfenwa 74'	Stadium: Gigg Lane; Attendance: 2,863

17 October 2009 13	Aldershot Town	2–3	Bury	Aldershot
	Winfield 9'; Soares 71'		Barry-Murphy 39'; Dawson 74'; Sodje 76'	Stadium: Recreation Ground; Attendance: 3,196

24 October 2009 14	Bury	2–1	Rotherham United	Bury
	Lowe 33'; Baker 84'		Ellison 45'	Stadium: Gigg Lane; Attendance: 3,496

31 October 2009 15	Burton Albion	0–0	Bury	Burton on Trent
				Stadium: Pirelli Stadium; Attendance: 3,373

14 November 2009 16	Bury	3–3	Notts County	Bury
	Nardiello 9'; Morrell 19'; Dawson 50'		Hughes 22', 38'; Ritchie 77'	Stadium: Gigg Lane; Attendance: 3,602

21 November 2009 15	Shrewsbury Town	1–1	Bury	Shrewsbury
	Coughlan 90'		Nardiello 29'	Stadium: Prostar Stadium; Attendance: 5,070

24 November 2009 18	Bury	2–1	Chesterfield	Bury
	Morrell 56', 71'		Small 90'	Stadium: Gigg Lane; Attendance: 2,504

1 December 2009 19	Morecambe	3–0	Bury	Morecambe
	Jevons 60' (pen.), 81'; Futcher 68' (o.g.)			Stadium: Christie Park; Attendance: 1,875

5 December 2009 20	Bury	2–0	Barnet	Bury
	Nardiello 45' (pen.); Worrall 82'		Hughes (red card) 90'	Stadium: Gigg Lane; Attendance: 2,511

12 December 2009 21	Dagenham & Redbridge	3–1	Bury	Dagenham
	Benson 18', 78'; Ofori-Twumasi 90'		Nardiello 45'	Stadium: Victoria Road; Attendance: 1,915

28 December 2009 22	Accrington Stanley	2–4	Bury	Accrington
	Symes 14'; McConville 69'		Jones 53'; Morrell 55', 75'; Lowe 90'	Stadium: Crown Ground; Attendance: 3,138

2 January 2010 23	Grimsby Town	1–1	Bury	Grimsby
	Akpa Akpro 60'		Lowe 90' (pen.)	Stadium: Blundell Park; Attendance: 3,463

2 January 2010 24	Bournemouth	1–2	Bury	Bournemouth
	Pitman 90'		Dawson 9'; Worrall 39'	Stadium: Fitness First Stadium; Attendance: 4,516

19 January 2010 25	Bury	2–1	Bradford City	Bury
	Jones 10'; Lowe 32' (pen.)		Sodje 23' (o.g.)	Stadium: Gigg Lane; Attendance: 2,930

23 January 2010 26	Bury	1–0	Hereford United	Bury
	Jones 2'			Stadium: Gigg Lane; Attendance: 2,797

1 February 2010 27	Bury	1–0	Rochdale	Bury
	Lowe 78'			Stadium: Gigg Lane; Attendance: 6,528

6 February 2010 28	Bradford City	0–1	Bury	Bradford
			Morrell 52'	Stadium: Valley Parade; Attendance: 11,965

9 February 2010 29	Bury	2–1	Macclesfield Town	Bury
	Lowe 29' (pen.); Bishop 79'		Butcher 26'	Stadium: Gigg Lane; Attendance: 2,169

13 February 2010 30	Chesterfield	1–0	Bury	Chesterfield
	Boden 58'			Stadium: Saltergate; Attendance: 4,122

19 February 2010 31	Bury	1–0	Shrewsbury Town	Bury
	Lowe 71' (pen.)			Stadium: Gigg Lane; Attendance: 3,720

23 February 2010 32	Bury	0–0	Morecambe	Bury
				Stadium: Gigg Lane; Attendance: 2,222

27 February 2010 32	Barnet	0–0	Bury	London
				Stadium: Underhill; Attendance: 1,949

6 March 2010 34	Bury	0–0	Dagenham & Redbridge	Bury
	Lowe 42' (pen.)		Purcell 32' (pen.)	Stadium: Gigg Lane; Attendance: 2,886

9 March 2009 35	Bury	1–1	Darlington	Bury
	Lowe 42' (pen.)		Purcell 32' (pen.)	Stadium: Gigg Lane; Attendance: 2,123

13 March 2010 36	Macclesfield Town	2–0	Bury	Macclesfield
	Wright 30'; Lindfield 57'		Lowe (red card) 44'	Stadium: Moss Rose; Attendance: 2,740

20 March 2010 37	Rotherham United	1–0	Bury	Sheffield
	Walker 80'			Stadium: Don Valley Stadium; Attendance: 3,521

27 March 2010 38	Bury	1–2	Aldershot Town	Bury
	Bishop 87' (pen.)		Scott Donnelly 30' (pen.), 56'; Jaimez-Ruiz (red card) 86'	Stadium: Gigg Lane; Attendance: 2,795

3 April 2010 39	Notts County	5–0	Bury	Nottingham
	Edwards 4'; Westcarr 52'; Davies 60'; Hughes 66'; Facey 81'			Stadium: Meadow Lane; Attendance: 7,005

5 April 2010 40	Bury	3–0	Burton Albion	Bury
	James 9' (o.g.); Morrell 76', 86'; Jones (red card) 90'			Stadium: Gigg Lane; Attendance: 2,710

10 April 2010 41	Cheltenham Town	5–2	Bury	Cheltenham
	Richards 37' (pen.); Thornhill 46'; Low 52', 85'; Hayles 86'		Lowe 80' (pen.), 82'; Brown (red card) 35'	Stadium: Whaddon Road; Attendance: 3,071

13 April 2010 42	Bury	3–0	Crewe Alexandra	Bury
	Morrell 30'; Lowe 48'; Bishop 88'			Stadium: Gigg Lane; Attendance: 2,178

17 April 2010 43	Bury	1–1	Port Vale	Bury
	Sodje 82'		Richards 30' (pen.)	Stadium: Gigg Lane; Attendance: 4,570

24 April 2010 44	Lincoln City	1–0	Bury	Lincoln
	Somma 80'			Stadium: Sincil Bank; Attendance: 3,403

1 May 2010 45	Bury	0–3	Torquay United	Bury
			Carayol 37'; Stevens 88'; Rendell 90'	Stadium: Gigg Lane; Attendance: 3,492

8 May 2010 46	Northampton Town	1–1	Bury	Northampton
	Akinfenwa 90'		Lowe 45'; James Poole (red card) 66'	Stadium: Sixfields; Attendance: 5,234

=== FA Cup ===
7 November 2009 Round 1	Aldershot Town	2–0	Bury	Aldershot
	Soares 13'; Donnelly 33'			Stadium: Recreation Ground; Attendance: 2,519

=== League Cup ===
11 August 2009 Round 1	Bury	0–2	West Bromwich Albion	Bury
			Dorrans 5'; Jones 25'	Stadium: Gigg Lane; Attendance: 3,077

=== Football League Trophy ===
1 September 2009 Round 1	Walsall	0–0 (a.e.t.) (4–5 p)	Bury	Walsall
				Stadium: Bescot Stadium; Attendance: 2,314

6 October 2009 Round 2	Bury	2–1	Tranmere Rovers	Bury
	Worrall 54'; Jones 81'		Curran 4'	Stadium: Gigg Lane; Attendance: 1,903

10 November 2009 Northern Quarter Final	Accrington Stanley	3–2	Bury	Accrington
	Symes 2', 40'; Grant 82'		Racchi 41'; Jones 48'	Stadium: Crown Ground; Attendance: 1,637

== Players ==
=== First-team squad ===
Includes all players who were awarded squad numbers during the season.

Note: Flags indicate national team as defined under FIFA eligibility rules; some limited exceptions apply. Players may hold more than one non-FIFA nationality.

No.	Pos.	Nation	Player
1	GK	ENG	Wayne Brown
2	DF	ENG	Paul Scott
3	DF	NIR	David Buchanan
4	DF	ENG	Sam Hewson (on loan from Manchester United)
5	DF	ENG	Ben Futcher
6	MF	ENG	Ryan Cresswell
7	MF	IRL	Stephen Dawson
8	MF	ENG	Richie Baker
9	FW	ENG	Danny Carlton
10	FW	ENG	Andy Bishop
11	MF	IRL	Brian Barry-Murphy
12	DF	ENG	Danny Racchi
14	MF	ENG	Mike Jones
15	FW	ENG	Ryan Lowe
16	DF	NGA	Efe Sodje

No.	Pos.	Nation	Player
17	MF	ENG	Damien Allen
18	FW	ENG	Andy Morrell
19	MF	ENG	David Worrall (on loan from West Bromwich Albion)
20	GK	WAL	Cameron Belford
21	GK	ENG	Neil Cutler
22	FW	ENG	Tom Elliott (on loan from Leeds United)
23	DF	ENG	Tom Newey
24	FW	SCO	Keigan Parker (on loan from Oldham Athletic)
25	FW	ENG	James Poole (on loan from Manchester City)
27	MF	ENG	Josh Rothwell
28	DF	ENG	Krishnan Patel
29	MF	ENG	Max Harrop
30	FW	ENG	Adam Dawson
31	MF	ENG	Luke McCarthy
32	GK	ENG	Ritchie Branagan

=== Left club during season ===
Note: Flags indicate national team as defined under FIFA eligibility rules; some limited exceptions apply. Players may hold more than one non-FIFA nationality.

No.	Pos.	Nation	Player
4	MF	ENG	Simon Johnson
21	FW	ENG	Domaine Rouse
13	MF	ENG	Jordan Robertson (on loan from Sheffield United)

No.	Pos.	Nation	Player
24	FW	ENG	Daniel Nardiello (on loan from Blackpool)
26	DF	ENG	David Thompson
