= Richie Baker (English footballer) =

English footballer (born 1987)

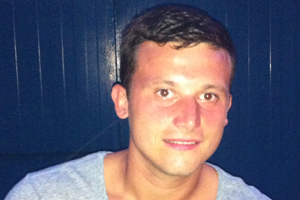
- Baker in 2013

Personal information
- Full name: Richard Peter Baker
- Date of birth: 29 December 1987 (age 38)
- Place of birth: Burnley, England
- Height: 1.80 m (5 ft 11 in)
- Position: Midfielder

Youth career
- 1997–2005: Manchester United
- 2005–2006: Preston North End

Senior career*
Years	Team	Apps	(Gls)
2006–2010	Bury	107	(7)
2010–2011	Oxford United	6	(0)
2011–2013	Barrow	91	(24)
2013–2014	Tamworth	29	(3)
2014–2015	Stockport County	26	(6)
2015–2017	AFC Fylde	76	(9)
2017	F.C. United of Manchester	3	(0)
2017–2018	Curzon Ashton	19	(2)
2018	Lancaster City		
2018–2019	Colne	45	(7)
2019–2021	Ramsbottom United	22	(2)
2021–2024	Clitheroe	87	(6)
2024–2026	Ramsbottom United	39	(5)
- * Club domestic league appearances and goals as of 21:41, 26 December 2022 (UTC)

Richard Peter Baker (born 29 December 1987) is an English footballer who plays for North West Counties Football League Premier side Nelson, where he plays as a midfielder.

== Youth career ==
Richie began his career in the highly successful Manchester United Academy, where he played as a right-back, and was understudy to Danny Simpson, which somewhat restricted Baker to much playing time, he also played alongside the likes of Gerard Piqué, Fraizer Campbell and Giuseppe Rossi, during his time at Old Trafford. Following the decision by Manchester United to release Baker, he joined Championship side Preston North End as a trainee, but failed to make a breakthrough into the first team and was released at the end of the 2005–06 season, due to the collapse of the reserve team.

== Playing career ==
=== Bury ===
Baker dropped down to join League Two side Bury in the summer of 2006, following an initial trial period. He made his professional debut under Chris Casper as an 18-year old on 19 August 2006, coming off the bench in a defeat to Wycombe Wanderers. Baker was due to start that match, “on the Friday, Chris told me I was starting which surprised me as I had only just joined. But, two hours before the game, Chris had changed his mind and told me he was going to leave me out. I was gutted but, in hindsight, he was right as he protected me as Wycombe hammered us. I came on in the second half and had a blinder. That is one of the highlights of my career.” After making his full debut in the League Cup victory over Championship side Sunderland in August, he became an integral part of the first team during the 2006–07 season. In January 2007, he committed his future to Bury by signing a new contract which extended his stay at Gigg Lane until the summer of 2009. In his first professional season he made 44 appearances in all competitions, scoring 6 goals as Bury finished in 21st place.

In his second season at the club he still remained a regular starter in the side, even when Casper was replaced by Alan Knill in February 2008. Bury had a much improved campaign, finishing in mid-table and having a run to the FA Cup fourth round for the first time since 1986, eventually losing 2–0 at Championship side Southampton. Baker made 39 appearances and scored one goal in the 2007–08 campaign. He became more of a squad player in his third season at the club, but did get a regular run of games over the Christmas period replacing the injured Brian Barry-Murphy having impressed Knill in training and after coming on as a substitute in 3–0 win over Port Vale. Bury had a very good first full season under Knill, finishing in 4th and narrowly missing out on automatic promotion to League One on the final game of the season by goal difference to Wycombe Wanderers. They then lost to Shrewsbury Town in the play-offs over two legs, with Baker failing to make the matchday squad in any of the final three games. In June 2009, Baker committed to a new one-year deal at Bury. Baker had a disappointing final year at the club personally as he only managed to feature in 19 games, describing his time at Bury he stated, "it went from playing week in, week out to playing every two, and then towards the back end of last season it was getting to not even getting on the pitch". He scored 8 goals in 129 appearances in total for Bury before leaving the club in the summer of 2010 when his contract expired.

=== Oxford United ===
On 1 July 2010, Baker joined newly-promoted League Two side Oxford United on a six-month deal to become the Chris Wilder's tenth summer signing. Wilder knew Baker from his time at Bury, where he had served nearly six-months as assistant to Alan Knill. Baker struggled to make an impact at the Kassam Stadium making eight appearances and only one start, which came in a defeat in the Football League Trophy to Aldershot Town. He was released from the club in January 2011 when his contract expired.

=== Barrow ===
Baker then signed for Barrow on 15 February 2011, making his debut against Mansfield Town four days later. In May 2011, he was offered a new contract by Barrow. Baker became a major part of the Barrow team for the subsequent two seasons. However, he left when they were relegated in May 2013.

=== Tamworth ===
Baker joined Tamworth on 24 May 2013.

=== Stockport County ===
Baker signed for Conference North side Stockport County on 3 August 2014, following some impressive displays whilst on trial, in particular scoring a brace in a pre-season friendly against Conference National side Macclesfield Town

=== AFC Fylde ===
Baker signed for Conference North side AFC Fylde on 13 March 2015. He made his debut the next day in a 2–2 draw at local rivals Chorley. On 11 May 2017, it was announced that Baker would leave Fylde upon the expiry of his current deal in June 2017.

=== F.C. United of Manchester ===
In July 2017, he signed for F.C. United of Manchester. He left the club on 2 September by mutual consent.

=== Curzon Ashton ===
On 23 September 2017, he signed for Curzon Ashton

=== Lancaster City ===
On 30 June 2018, it was announced that Baker had dropped down a division to sign for Northern Premier League Premier Division side Lancaster City, managed by Phil Brown.

=== Colne ===
On 11 December 2018, Baker was announced as signing for Colne. He re-joined the club on 23 June 2019.

=== Ramsbottom United ===
On 16 November 2019, he joined Ramsbottom United who were managed by Chris Wilcock. He made 27 appearances for the club over three season.

=== Clitheroe ===
In August 2021, he signed for Northern Premier League Division One West rivals Clitheroe, where he teamed up with former Ramsbottom duo Billy Priestley and Gary Stopforth who were joint-managers. Ramsbottom manager, Lee Donafee, stated that Clitheroe "made him an offer he couldn't refuse. Stopforth is a very good friend of his and they offered him a good deal, maybe helping them out with coaching and that which is a real shame for us."

== Career statistics ==
As of match played end of 2021–22 season

Appearances and goals by club, season and competition
Club	Season	League			FA Cup		League Cup		Other		Total	
Club	Season	Division	Apps	Goals	Apps	Goals	Apps	Goals	Apps	Goals	Apps	Goals
Bury	2006–07	League Two	39	5	3	1	2	0	0	0	44	6
Bury	2007–08	League Two	32	1	5	0	1	0	2 (Note: Appearances in the Football League Trophy)	0	40	1
Bury	2008–09	League Two	22	0	1	0	1	0	2	0	26	0
Bury	2009–10	League Two	14	1	1	0	1	0	3	0	19	1
Bury	Total		107	7	10	1	5	0	7	0	129	8
Oxford United	2010–11	League Two	6	0	0	0	1	0	1	0	8	0
Barrow	2010–11	Conference Premier	14	5	—		—		—		14	5
Barrow	2011–12	Conference Premier	39	9	2	0	—		1 (Note: Appearances in the FA Trophy)	1	42	10
Barrow	2012–13	Conference Premier	38	10	4	1	—		5	3	47	14
Barrow	Total		91	24	6	1	0	0	6	4	103	29
Tamworth	2013–14	Conference Premier	29	3	0	0	—		3	0	32	3
Stockport County	2014–15	Conference North	26	6	3	1	—		3	0	32	7
AFC Fylde	2014–15	Conference North	9	0	—		—		2 (Note: Appearances in the Conference North play-offs)	0	11	0
AFC Fylde	2015–16	National League North	39	8	4	0	—		6 (Note: Three appearances in the National League North play-offs, three in FA Trophy)	0	49	8
AFC Fylde	2016–17	National League North	28	1	0	0	—		3	0	31	1
AFC Fylde	Total		76	9	4	0	—		11	0	91	9
F.C. United of Manchester	2017–18	National League North	3	0	—		—		—		3	0
Curzon Ashton	2017–18	National League North	19	2	0	0	—		0	0	19	2
Colne	2019–20	NPL Division One West	12	1	—		—		1 (Note: Appearances in the Northern Premier League Division One West play-offs)	0	13	1
Colne	2019–20	NPL Division One North West	3	0	1	1	—		1	0	5	1
Colne	Total		15	1	1	1	—		2	0	18	2
Ramsbottom United	2019–20	NPL Division One North West	14	2	—		—		1 (Note: Appearances in the Northern Premier League Challenge Cup)	0	15	2
Ramsbottom United	2020–21	NPL Division One North West	6	0	1	0	—		2	0	9	0
Ramsbottom United	2021–22	NPL Division One West	2	0	1	1	—		—		3	1
Ramsbottom United	Total		22	2	2	1	—		3	0	27	3
Clitheroe	2021–22	NPL Division One West	33	3	—		—		1	0	34	3
Career total			427	57	26	5	6	0	37	4	496	66
