= Anane =

Anane may refer to:

- Merouane Anane (born 1990), Algerian footballer
- Mustapha Anane (1950–2010), Algerian international footballer
- Ricky Anane (born 1989), English footballer
- Richard W. Anane (born 1954), Ghanaian politician
- Yaw Anane (born 1982), association footballer
