= Steve Haslam =

English footballer (born 1979)

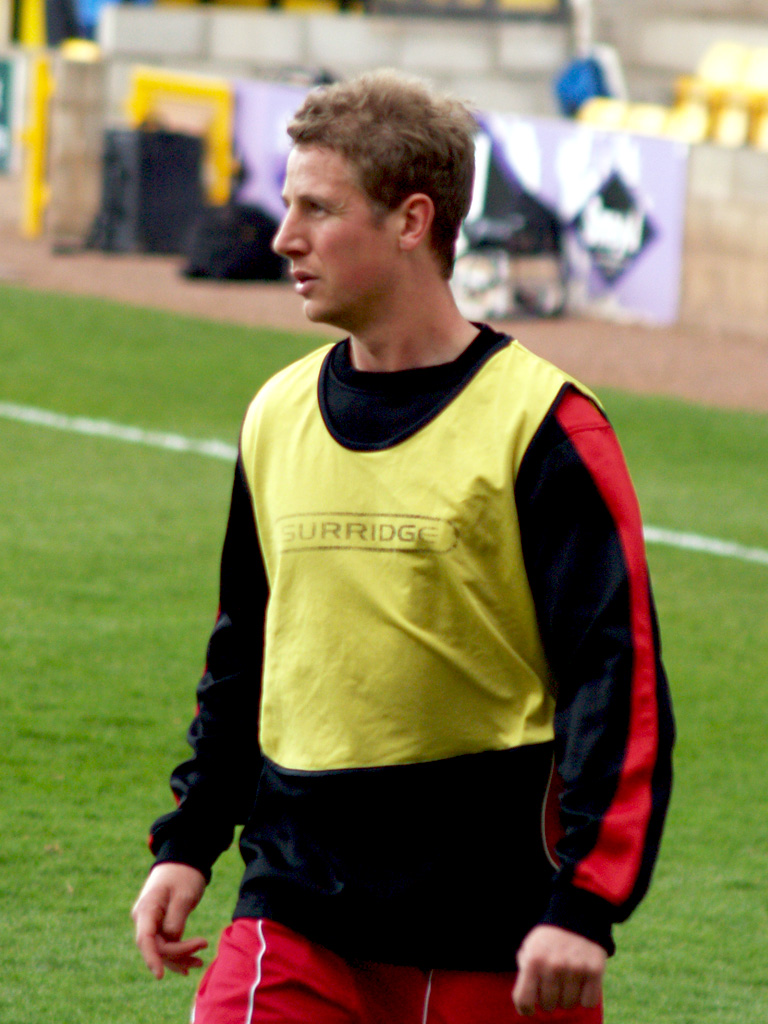
- Haslam pictured in 2009

Personal information
- Full name: Steven Robert Haslam
- Date of birth: 6 September 1979 (age 47)
- Place of birth: Sheffield, England
- Position: Defender

Senior career*
Years	Team	Apps	(Gls)
1998–2004	Sheffield Wednesday	143	(1)
2004	Halifax Town	2	(0)
2004	Northampton Town	3	(0)
2004–2007	Halifax Town	90	(0)
2007–2009	Bury	52	(1)
2009–2012	Hartlepool United	54	(0)
2012	AFC Fylde	8	(0)
Total		352	(2)

International career
- England Youth
- * Club domestic league appearances and goals

Steven Robert Haslam (born 6 September 1979) is an English former professional footballer who played as a defender.

== Playing career ==
=== Early career ===
Back in 1995, Steve Haslam captained an England schoolboys team to a 1–0 victory over a Brazilian team including Ronaldinho. The team he captained included the likes of Wes Brown, Michael Ball and Michael Owen (who scored the only goal).

=== Sheffield Wednesday ===
Haslam then started his professional football career at Sheffield Wednesday, the team he had supported all his life. Signed as a trainee in the 1996–97 season, he made his debut in the FA Premier League, aged 19 on 8 May 1999 in a 1–0 victory against Liverpool at Hillsborough.

He continued to make over 100 appearances and score 2 goals for the Yorkshire club. Showing ability to play across the back four and in midfield, he captained the side at every level including the first team.

He was released from the club along with 12 other players by Chris Turner at the end of the 2003–04 season before being signed by Halifax Town.

=== Halifax Town and Bury ===
After almost 100 games for Halifax, it was announced on 18 June 2007 that Haslam had made a return to the Football League by signing a two-year deal with Bury. His first goal for the club was a 30-yard shot against Notts County on 13 October 2007. Although he had a sustained run in the side towards the end of 2008–09 season due to injury to Paul Scott, his contract was not renewed at the end of the season.

=== Hartlepool United ===
He signed for League One side Hartlepool United on 6 August 2009, after impressing Director of Sport and his former boss at Sheffield Wednesday Chris Turner while on trial. Haslam made his debut for Pools on the opening game of the 2009–10 season in a 0–0 draw away at MK Dons. In May 2011 he signed a new contract with the club. Haslam was released on 10 May 2012, he made 63 appearances in all competitions for the club.

=== AFC Fylde ===
On 18 September 2012, Haslam joined Northern Premier League side AFC Fylde on a free transfer.

== Coaching career ==
Haslam holds a UEFA Pro Licence. Following his retirement from football, Haslam began coaching at Sheffield Wednesday's academy. In June 2017, Haslam was appointed as Sheffield Wednesday's academy manager. On 14 November 2024, Wednesday announced that Haslam would be leaving the club to take up a new Academy Auditor role with the Professional Game Academy Audit Company.

== Personal life ==
Haslam has a degree from Sheffield Hallam University in Business and Management which he studied part-time.

== Career statistics ==
Appearances and goals by club, season and competition
Club	Season	League			FA Cup		League Cup		Other		Total	
Club	Season	Division	Apps	Goals	Apps	Goals	Apps	Goals	Apps	Goals	Apps	Goals
Sheffield Wednesday	1998–99	Premier League	2	0	0	0	0	0	0	0	2	0
Sheffield Wednesday	1999–00	Premier League	23	0	3	0	1	0	0	0	27	0
Sheffield Wednesday	2000–01	First Division	27	0	2	0	3	0	0	0	32	0
Sheffield Wednesday	2001–02	First Division	41	0	1	0	7	0	0	0	49	0
Sheffield Wednesday	2002–03	First Division	25	1	1	0	0	0	0	0	26	1
Sheffield Wednesday	2003–04	Division Two	25	0	3	0	0	0	6	0	34	0
Sheffield Wednesday	Total		143	1	10	0	11	0	6	0	170	1
Northampton Town	2004–05	League Two	3	0	0	0	0	0	0	0	3	0
Halifax Town	2004–05	Conference Premier	32	0	2	0	0	0	1	0	35	0
Halifax Town	2005–06	Conference Premier	40	0	2	0	0	0	5	1	47	1
Halifax Town	2006–07	Conference Premier	20	0	0	0	0	0	0	0	20	0
Halifax Town	Total		92	0	4	0	0	0	6	1	102	1
Bury	2007–08	League Two	37	1	5	0	0	0	3	0	45	1
Bury	2008–09	League Two	15	0	0	0	0	0	1	0	16	0
Bury	Total		52	1	5	0	0	0	4	0	61	1
Hartlepool United	2009–10	League One	15	0	0	0	2	0	1	0	18	0
Hartlepool United	2010–11	League One	29	0	1	0	2	0	2	0	34	0
Hartlepool United	2011–12	League One	10	0	0	0	0	0	1	0	11	0
Hartlepool United	Total		54	0	1	0	4	0	4	0	63	0
AFC Fylde	2012–13	NPL Premier Division	8	0	1	0	0	0	0	0	9	0
Career total			352	2	21	0	15	0	20	1	408	3
