= Richard Anane (disambiguation) =

Richard Anane may refer to:

- Ricky Anane (born 1989), English footballer
- Richard Anane, Ghanaian politician, see Presidency of John Kufuor
