= Andy Bishop =

English footballer (born 1982)

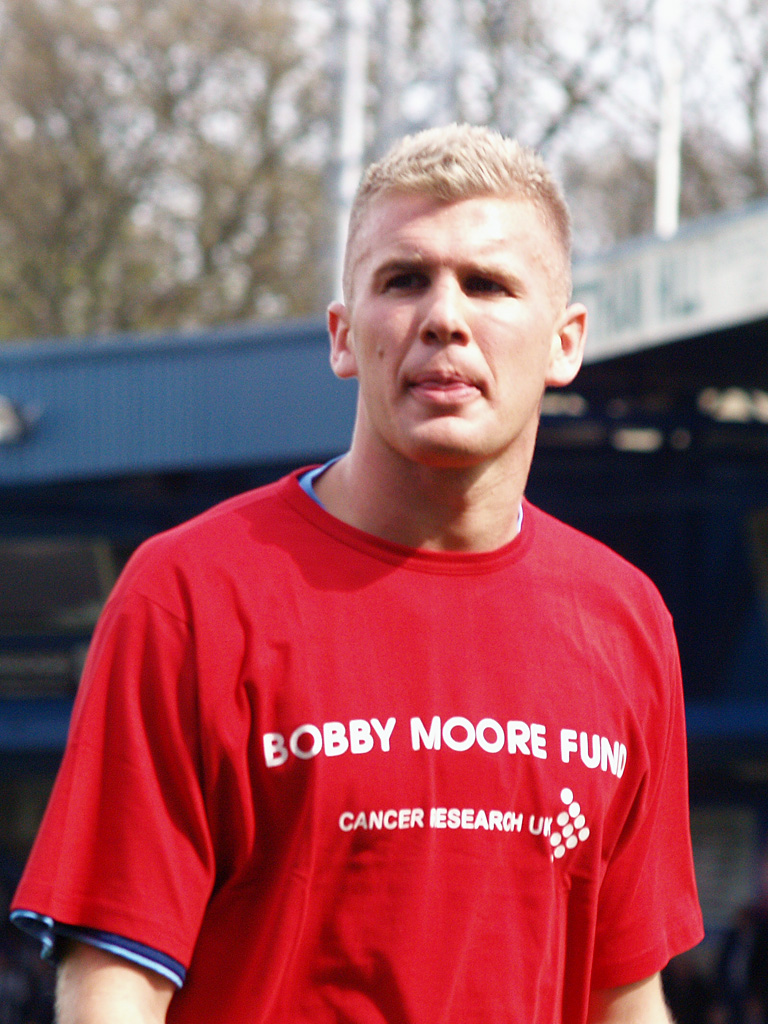
- Bishop training with Bury in 2008

Personal information
- Full name: Andrew Jamie Bishop
- Date of birth: 19 October 1982 (age 44)
- Place of birth: Cannock, England
- Height: 6 ft 0 in (1.83 m)
- Position: Striker

Team information
- Current team: Stalybridge Celtic

Youth career
- –2002: Walsall

Senior career*
Years	Team	Apps	(Gls)
2002–2004	Walsall	0	(0)
2002–2003	→ Kidderminster Harriers (loan)	29	(5)
2003	→ Kidderminster Harriers (loan)	11	(2)
2003–2004	→ Rochdale (loan)	10	(1)
2004	→ Yeovil Town (loan)	5	(2)
2004–2006	York City	78	(33)
2006–2013	Bury	236	(69)
2012	→ Wrexham (loan)	4	(2)
2013–2015	Wrexham	77	(14)
2015	FC Halifax Town	4	(0)
2015–2016	Southport	27	(4)
2016–2017	Hyde United	15	(6)
2017–	Stalybridge Celtic	4	(1)

International career
2004–2006	England C	4	(2)

Managerial career
- 2016: Southport
- * Club domestic league appearances and goals as of 11 April 2017 (UTC)

Andrew Jamie Bishop (born 19 October 1982) is an English semi-professional footballer who last played as a striker for National League North club Stalybridge Celtic.

Bishop started his career in the youth team at Walsall, taking loan spells with Kidderminster Harriers, Rochdale and Yeovil Town. He was released by Walsall in 2004 and he joined York City where he stayed for two seasons before signing for Bury. Bishop was the player-manager of National League club Southport during 2016.

== Club career ==
=== Walsall ===
Born in Cannock, Staffordshire, Bishop started his career at Walsall's youth system as a trainee, signing a professional contract on 9 August 2002. He joined Kidderminster Harriers on a one-month loan on 18 November 2002. Kidderminster extended this loan in December 2002. He joined Kidderminster for a second spell, joining on loan at the start of the 2003–04 season. His loan at Kidderminster was extended for a second month in September 2003.

He was signed by Rochdale on a one-month loan on 20 November 2003. This loan was extended for a second month in December 2003. He returned to Walsall in January 2004, after Rochdale opted not to extend his loan.

He joined Yeovil Town on a one-month loan on 5 February 2004. Yeovil decided not to sign Bishop on a permanent deal, because of niggling injury problems.

=== York City ===
Bishop was signed by Conference National team York City on 15 July 2004 after rejecting a new deal at Walsall. He was named the Conference National Player of the Month for February 2006, having scored seven goals to help York move into a play-off place during that month. He scored 22 goals for York in the Conference National during 2005–06, which made him the division's top scorer.

=== Bury ===
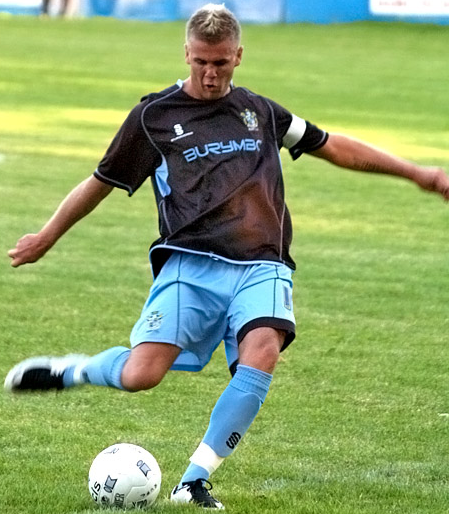
Bishop playing for Bury in 2008

Bishop joined League Two club Bury on a free transfer on 8 May 2006, signing a two-year contract. He marked his first season back in the Football League by scoring 21 goals in all competitions, becoming the first Bury player to score 20 or more goals in a season for 13 seasons. He signed a new deal with Bury, which would expire in June 2010, in September 2007.

Bury offered Bishop a new contract in January 2009, but he rejected it to weigh up his options. However, he eventually signed a new two-and-a-half-year contract, which contracted him at the club until June 2012. Bishop missed the majority of 2009–10 due to two surgeries, and only returned to full fitness in February 2010. Grimsby Town made an enquiry for Bishop in May 2010, following their relegation into the Conference Premier. On 30 November 2011, Bishop signed a contract extension with Bury until the end of the 2013–14 season.

On 31 August 2012, Bishop signed for Conference Premier club Wrexham on loan until 2 January 2013. He made his debut in Wrexham's 0–0 draw away to Luton Town on 15 September 2012, before scoring his first goal the following week in a 2–2 home draw with Dartford. He was recalled by Bury on 4 October 2012, after making four appearances and scoring two goals. His return to the team came after starting in a 1–1 extra time draw with Rochdale in the Football League Trophy second round, which Bury won 5–4 in a penalty shoot-out.

=== Wrexham ===
Bishop joined Conference Premier side Wrexham permanently on a two-year contract on 9 July 2013. Bishop made his debut in his second spell in a 2–1 home win against Welling United, before scoring his first goal on 14 September 2013 in a 2–0 home win against Luton. Bishop achieved his first hat-trick for Wrexham in November 2013, as they came from behind to beat Gateshead 3–2. He was released by new manager Gary Mills in May 2015.

=== FC Halifax Town ===
Bishop signed for National League club FC Halifax Town on 23 June 2015. He made his debut on the opening day of 2015–16, in a 3–1 loss to Boreham Wood on 11 August 2015. Bishop made four appearances for Halifax, before joining their divisional rivals Southport on 27 August 2015.

=== Southport ===
Bishop made his first appearance for Southport against Barrow on 29 August 2015 in a 1-0 losing effort. He scored his first goal for the club on 17 October 2015, the only goal in a 1–0 win over Kidderminster Harriers. He was appointed as Southport's caretaker manager on 19 March 2016, and took charge of their 1–0 away defeat to Torquay United the same day. He was appointed as player-manager permanently on 27 April 2016, after losing only one of his first seven matches in charge. His Southport team finished the 2015–16 National League in 16th place. On 3 September 2016, Bishop parted company Southport, after the team won only one of their first eight matches of 2016–17.

=== Hyde United ===
Bishop returned to playing with Northern Premier League Division One North club Hyde United, making his debut on 27 September 2016 when starting in a 4–0 away win over Prescot Cables.

== International career ==
Bishop was capped four times by England C, scoring two goals, from 2004 to 2006.

== Career statistics ==
Appearances and goals by club, season and competition
Club	Season	League			FA Cup		League Cup		Other		Total	
Club	Season	Division	Apps	Goals	Apps	Goals	Apps	Goals	Apps	Goals	Apps	Goals
Walsall	2002–03	First Division	0	0	—		0	0	—		0	0
Walsall	2003–04	First Division	0	0	—		—		—		0	0
Walsall	Total		0	0	—		0	0	—		0	0
Kidderminster Harriers (loan)	2002–03	Third Division	29	5	—		—		1 (Note: Appearance(s) in Football League Trophy)	0	30	5
Kidderminster Harriers (loan)	2003–04	Third Division	11	2	—		—		—		11	2
Kidderminster Harriers (loan)	Total		40	7	—		—		1	0	41	7
Rochdale (loan)	2003–04	Third Division	10	1	1	0	—		—		11	1
Yeovil Town (loan)	2003–04	Third Division	5	2	—		—		—		5	2
York City	2004–05	Conference National	38	11	1	0	—		3 (Note: One appearance in Football League Trophy, one appearance in FA Trophy, one appearance and one goal in Conference League Cup)	1	42	12
York City	2005–06	Conference National	40	22	2	2	—		1 (Note: Appearance(s) in FA Trophy)	1	43	25
York City	Total		78	33	3	2	—		4	2	85	37
Bury	2006–07	League Two	43	15	4	5	2	1	0	0	49	21
Bury	2007–08	League Two	44	19	5	5	1	0	2	1	52	25
Bury	2008–09	League Two	41	16	1	0	1	0	4 (Note: Two appearances and one goal in Football League Trophy, two appearances in League Two play-offs)	1	47	17
Bury	2009–10	League Two	25	3	0	0	0	0	1	0	26	3
Bury	2010–11	League Two	19	4	0	0	1	0	0	0	20	4
Bury	2011–12	League One	40	8	1	0	1	1	1	0	43	9
Bury	2012–13	League One	24	4	1	0	1	0	1	0	27	4
Bury	Total		236	69	12	10	7	2	9	2	264	83
Wrexham (loan)	2012–13	Conference Premier	4	2	—		—		—		4	2
Wrexham	2013–14	Conference Premier	38	7	3	2	—		1	0	42	9
Wrexham	2014–15	Conference Premier	39	7	5	5	—		9	3	53	15
Wrexham	Total		81	16	8	7	—		10	3	99	26
FC Halifax Town	2015–16	National League	4	0	—		—		—		4	0
Southport	2015–16	National League	23	3	1	0	—		1	0	25	3
Southport	2016–17	National League	4	1	—		—		—		4	1
Southport	Total		27	4	1	0	—		1	0	29	4
Hyde United	2016–17	Northern Premier League Division One North	15	6	—		—		1	0	16	6
Career total			496	138	25	19	7	2	26	7	554	166

== Managerial statistics ==
As of 3 September 2016

Managerial record by team and tenure
Team	From	To	Record					Ref
Team	From	To	P	W	D	L	Win %	Ref
Southport	19 March 2016	3 September 2016	16	4	4	8	25.0	
Total			16	4	4	8	25.0	—

== Honours ==
Wrexham

- FA Trophy runner-up: 2014–15

Individual

- PFA Team of the Year: 2008–09 League Two
