= 2002–03 Sheffield Wednesday F.C. season =

English football club season

Sheffield Wednesday
2002–03 season
- Chairman: Geoff Hulley
- Manager: Terry Yorath (until 31 October); Bill Green (caretaker until 7 November); Chris Turner (from 7 November)
- Stadium: Hillsborough
- First Division: 22nd (relegated)
- FA Cup: Third round
- League Cup: Second round
- Top goalscorer: League: Kuqi (8); All: Sibon (9)
- Average home league attendance: 20,327

During the 2002–03 English football season, Sheffield Wednesday competed in the Football League First Division.

== Season summary ==
After the Owls made a terrible start to the 2002–03 season, manager Terry Yorath resigned in October and Hartlepool manager Chris Turner - a former Owls goalkeeper - was appointed as his replacement. Turner made a big effort to rejuvenate the side and there were some impressive results during the final weeks of the season, but a failure to beat Brighton in the penultimate game of the season condemned them to relegation.

== Final league table ==
Pos	Team	Pld	W	D	L	GF	GA	GD	Pts	Promotion or relegation
20	Coventry City	46	12	14	20	46	62	−16	50	
21	Stoke City	46	12	14	20	45	69	−24	50	
22	Sheffield Wednesday (R)	46	10	16	20	56	73	−17	46	Relegation to 2003–04 Second Division
23	Brighton & Hove Albion (R)	46	11	12	23	49	67	−18	45	Relegation to 2003–04 Second Division
24	Grimsby Town (R)	46	9	12	25	48	85	−37	39	Relegation to 2003–04 Second Division

Updated to match(es) played on 11 May 2003. Source: Soccerway
Rules for classification: 1) points; 2) goal difference; 3) number of goals scored.
(R) Relegated

== Results ==
Sheffield Wednesday's score comes first

=== Legend ===
Win	Draw	Loss

=== Football League First Division ===
Date	Opponent	Venue	Result	Attendance	Scorers
10 August 2002	Stoke City	H	0–0	26,746	
13 August 2002	Reading	A	1–2	13,638	Sibon
17 August 2002	Nottingham Forest	A	0–4	21,129	
24 August 2002	Rotherham United	H	1–2	22,873	Armstrong
27 August 2002	Wolverhampton Wanderers	A	2–2	27,096	Kuqi (2)
1 September 2002	Sheffield United	H	2–0	27,075	Owusu, Kuqi
14 September 2002	Preston North End	A	2–2	13,632	Kuqi, McLaren
18 September 2002	Coventry City	A	1–1	14,178	Knight
21 September 2002	Leicester City	H	0–0	22,219	
25 September 2002	Crystal Palace	H	0–0	16,112	
28 September 2002	Walsall	A	0–1	6,792	
5 October 2002	Burnley	H	1–3	17,004	Donnelly
12 October 2002	Ipswich Town	A	1–2	23,410	Donnelly
19 October 2002	Bradford City	H	2–1	17,191	Sibon (2, 1 pen)
26 October 2002	Watford	A	0–1	15,058	
30 October 2002	Millwall	H	0–1	16,791	
2 November 2002	Derby County	H	1–3	19,747	Hamshaw
9 November 2002	Norwich City	A	0–3	20,667	
16 November 2002	Gillingham	A	1–1	8,028	Knight
23 November 2002	Portsmouth	H	1–3	16,602	Knight
30 November 2002	Wimbledon	A	0–3	2,131	
7 December 2002	Brighton & Hove Albion	H	1–1	18,008	Kuqi
14 December 2002	Gillingham	H	0–2	17,715	
21 December 2002	Grimsby Town	A	0–2	8,224	
26 December 2002	Nottingham Forest	H	2–0	26,362	Sibon, Johnston
28 December 2002	Stoke City	A	2–3	16,042	Sibon, Proudlock
1 January 2003	Rotherham United	A	2–0	11,480	Kuqi, Proudlock
11 January 2003	Reading	H	3–2	17,715	Quinn, Sibon, Johnston
17 January 2003	Sheffield United	A	1–3	28,179	Quinn
1 February 2003	Wolverhampton Wanderers	H	0–4	21,381	
8 February 2003	Norwich City	H	2–2	19,114	Robinson, Quinn
15 February 2003	Derby County	A	2–2	26,311	Barton (own goal), Crane
22 February 2003	Crystal Palace	A	0–0	16,707	
1 March 2003	Preston North End	H	0–1	18,912	
5 March 2003	Coventry City	H	5–1	19,536	Reddy, Kuqi (2), McLaren, Bradbury
8 March 2003	Leicester City	A	1–1	27,463	McLaren
15 March 2003	Ipswich Town	H	0–1	24,726	
18 March 2003	Bradford City	A	1–1	14,452	Crane
22 March 2003	Millwall	A	0–3	7,338	
29 March 2003	Watford	H	2–2	17,086	Bradbury (pen), Maddix
5 April 2003	Wimbledon	H	4–2	17,649	Reddy, Owusu (2), Bradbury
12 April 2003	Portsmouth	A	2–1	19,524	Westwood, Reddy
19 April 2003	Grimsby Town	H	0–0	26,082	
21 April 2003	Brighton & Hove Albion	A	1–1	6,928	Holt
26 April 2003	Burnley	A	7–2	17,435	McLaren, Westwood, Wood, R Evans, Haslam, Gnohéré (own goal), Quinn
4 May 2003	Walsall	H	2–1	20,864	Owusu, Quinn

=== FA Cup ===
Round	Date	Opponent	Venue	Result	Attendance	Goalscorers
R3	7 January 2003	Gillingham	A	1–4	6,434	Sibon

=== League Cup ===
Round	Date	Opponent	Venue	Result	Attendance	Goalscorers
R1	11 September 2002	Rochdale	H	1–0	8,815	Sibon
R2	2 October 2002	Leicester City	H	1–2 (a.e.t.)	10,472	Sibon

== Squad ==
Note: Flags indicate national team as defined under FIFA eligibility rules; some limited exceptions apply. Players may hold more than one non-FIFA nationality.

No.	Pos.	Nation	Player
1	GK	ENG	Kevin Pressman
3	DF	ENG	Jon Beswetherick
4	MF	ENG	Paul McLaren
5	DF	ENG	Leigh Bromby
6	MF	NOR	Trond Egil Soltvedt
7	MF	IRL	Alan Quinn
9	FW	FIN	Shefki Kuqi
10	FW	ENG	Lloyd Owusu
11	FW	ENG	Leon Knight (on loan from Chelsea)
12	DF	ENG	Steve Haslam
13	GK	ENG	Chris Stringer
14	DF	ENG	Craig Armstrong
15	DF	ENG	David Burrows
16	MF	ENG	Matt Hamshaw
18	MF	SCO	Simon Donnelly
19	DF	WAL	Ryan Green

No.	Pos.	Nation	Player
20	MF	ENG	Tony Crane
21	DF	ENG	Ashley Westwood
22	DF	IRL	Derek Geary
23	GK	RSA	Paul Evans
24	MF	SCO	Phil O'Donnell
25	DF	ENG	Danny Maddix
26	FW	ITA	Michele Di Piedi
28	FW	ENG	Grant Holt
32	FW	ENG	Jon Shaw
33	DF	ENG	Richard Wood
34	MF	ENG	Matt Shaw
35	MF	JAM	Darryl Powell
37	FW	IRL	Michael Reddy (on loan from Sunderland)
38	MF	IRL	Brian Barry-Murphy
39	DF	ENG	Dean Smith
40	MF	WAL	Richard Evans

=== Left club during season ===
Note: Flags indicate national team as defined under FIFA eligibility rules; some limited exceptions apply. Players may hold more than one non-FIFA nationality.

No.	Pos.	Nation	Player
28	FW	NGR	Efan Ekoku (to Brentford)
28	FW	ENG	Adam Proudlock (on loan from Wolverhampton Wanderers)
8	FW	NED	Gerald Sibon (to SC Heerenveen)
2	DF	ENG	Ian Hendon (to Peterborough United)
36	MF	WAL	Carl Robinson (on loan from Portsmouth)

No.	Pos.	Nation	Player
17	FW	NIR	Owen Morrison (to Sheffield United)
27	DF	ENG	Garry Monk (on loan from Southampton)
30	FW	ENG	Lee Bradbury (on loan from Portsmouth)
29	MF	SCO	Allan Johnston (on loan from Middlesbrough)
