= David Buchanan (footballer, born 1986) =

English footballer

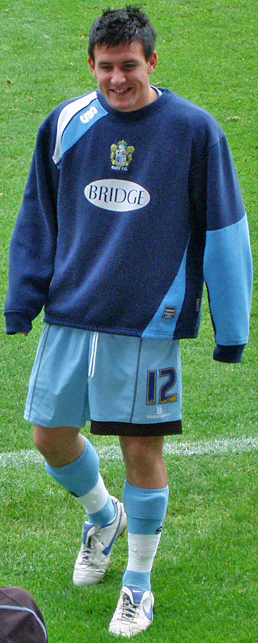
- Buchanan in 2007

Personal information
- Full name: David Thomas Hugh Buchanan
- Date of birth: 6 May 1986 (age 40)
- Place of birth: Rochdale, England
- Height: 5 ft 8 in (1.73 m)
- Position: Left-back

Youth career
- Roach Dynamos JFC
- Bolton Wanderers
- –2005: Bury

Senior career*
Years	Team	Apps	(Gls)
2005–2010	Bury	188	(0)
2010–2011	Hamilton Academical	28	(1)
2011–2012	Tranmere Rovers	41	(1)
2012–2015	Preston North End	69	(0)
2015–2019	Northampton Town	162	(1)
2019–2021	Chesterfield	35	(0)

International career
2004–2005	Northern Ireland U19	7	(1)
2006–2008	Northern Ireland U21	15	(2)
- * Club domestic league appearances and goals as of 17:03, 18 October 2021 (UTC)

David Thomas Hugh Buchanan (born 6 May 1986) is a footballer who played in the Football League for Bury, Tranmere Rovers, Preston North End and Northampton Town, and in the Scottish Premier League for Hamilton Academical. Though born in England, Buchanan represented Northern Ireland at under-19 and under-21 level. A left-back, Buchanan played most recently for Chesterfield. His cousin is former Lisburn Distillery footballer Wayne Buchanan.

== Career ==
Born in Rochdale, Greater Manchester, Buchanan was called into the Northern Ireland under-19 squad in November 2004 for their match against Italy.

Buchanan was released from Bury at the end of his contract. The club had offered Buchanan a new contract, however after previous failed negotiations and period of no response from the player following a new contract offer, the club sought a replacement player and issued a statement claiming that the club would not be held to ransom over contract negotiations.

=== Hamilton Academical ===
He signed for Hamilton Academical in July 2010

=== Tranmere Rovers ===
He moved to Tranmere Rovers in the summer of 2011. The club offered him contract terms for the 2012–13 season. Although the club reported that he and his agent had agreed a two-year contract, they reported on 24 May that Preston North End had agreed a deal with them.

=== Preston North End ===
Buchanan made his debut for Preston on 13 August 2012 against Huddersfield Town in the first round of the League Cup. On 17 December 2013, Buchanan extended his contract with Preston for a further twelve months, thus keeping him at the club until the summer of 2015.

=== Northampton Town ===
Buchanan signed with League Two club Northampton Town following his release by Preston North End. He was one of 8 players released by Northampton at the end of the 2018–19 season; a further 3 were placed for sale.

=== Chesterfield ===
In June 2019 Buchanan signed a two-year contract to play for Chesterfield in the National League for the 2019/2020 season. At the end of the 2020–21 season, Buchanan was released.

=== Rochdale Sacred Heart FC ===
In 2021, Buchanan signed for Manchester Football League Premier Division side Rochdale Sacred Heart following his release from Chesterfield.

== Career statistics ==
As of match played 14 March 2020

Appearances and goals by club, season and competition
Club	Season	League			National Cup		League Cup		Other		Total	
Club	Season	Division	Apps	Goals	Apps	Goals	Apps	Goals	Apps	Goals	Apps	Goals
Bury	2004–05	League Two	3	0	0	0	0	0	0	0	3	0
Bury	2005–06	League Two	23	0	2	0	0	0	1 (Note: Appearances in the Football League Trophy)	0	26	0
Bury	2006–07	League Two	41	0	4	0	2	0	1	0	48	0
Bury	2007–08	League Two	35	0	5	0	1	0	3	0	44	0
Bury	2008–09	League Two	48	0	1	0	1	0	2	0	52	0
Bury	2009–10	League Two	38	0	1	0	1	0	2	0	42	0
Bury	Total		188	0	13	0	5	0	9	0	215	0
Hamilton Academical	2010–11	Scottish Premier League	28	1	2	0	0	0	0	0	30	1
Tranmere Rovers	2011–12	League One	41	1	1	0	0	0	2	0	44	1
Preston North End	2012–13	League One	33	0	1	0	2	0	2	0	38	0
Preston North End	2013–14	League One	19	0	4	0	1	0	2 (Note: One appearance in the Football League Trophy and one in the League One play-offs)	0	26	0
Preston North End	2014–15	League One	17	0	4	0	0	0	4	0	25	0
Preston North End	Total		69	0	9	0	3	0	8	0	89	0
Northampton Town	2015–16	League Two	46	0	4	0	2	0	2	0	54	0
Northampton Town	2016–17	League One	45	0	2	0	3	0	3 (Note: Appearances in the EFL Trophy)	0	53	0
Northampton Town	2017–18	League One	32	1	1	0	1	0	2	0	36	1
Northampton Town	2018–19	League Two	39	0	1	0	0	0	4	0	44	0
Northampton Town	Total		162	1	8	0	6	0	11	0	187	1
Chesterfield	2019–20	National League	25	0	0	0	—		1	0	26	0
Chesterfield	2020–21	National League	0	0	0	0	—		0	0	0	0
Chesterfield	Total		25	0	0	0	0	0	1	0	26	0
Career total			513	3	33	0	14	0	30	0	591	3

== Honours ==
Northampton Town

- Football League Two: 2015–16

Individual

- Tranmere Rovers Player of the Year: 2011–12
