= Mike Jones (footballer) =

English footballer (born 1987)

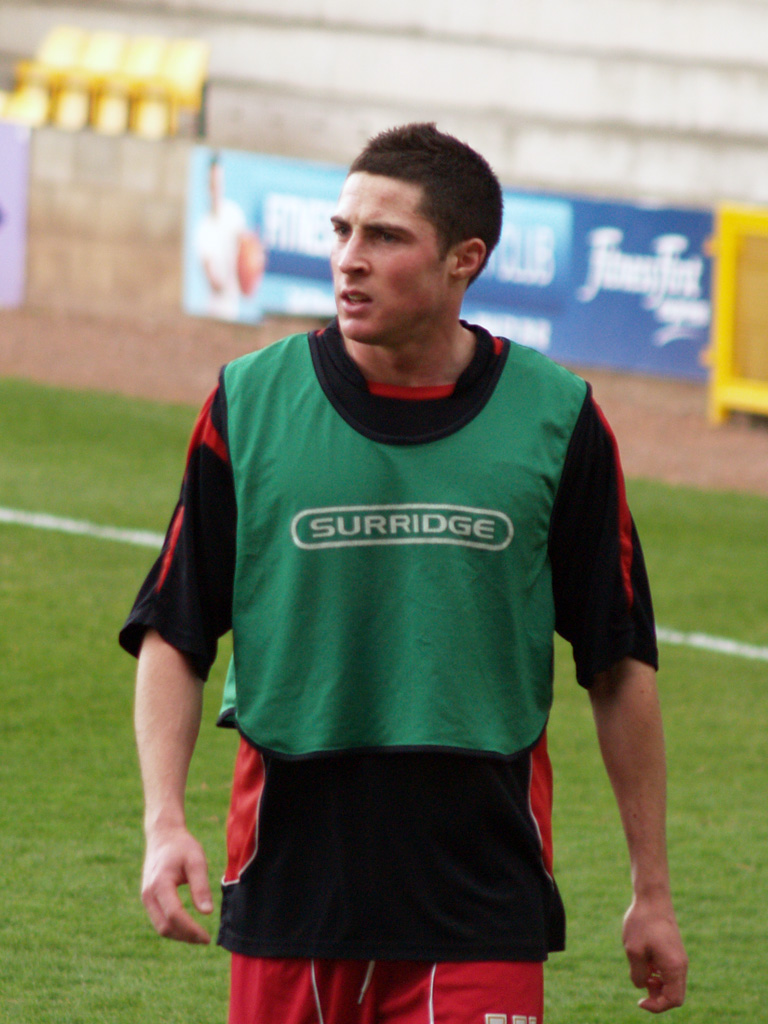
- Jones with Bury in 2009

Personal information
- Full name: Michael David Jones
- Date of birth: 15 August 1987 (age 39)
- Place of birth: Birkenhead, England
- Height: 5 ft 8 in (1.73 m)
- Position: Midfielder

Youth career
- –2006: Tranmere Rovers

Senior career*
Years	Team	Apps	(Gls)
2006–2008	Tranmere Rovers	10	(1)
2007	→ Shrewsbury Town (loan)	13	(1)
2008–2012	Bury	153	(20)
2012	Sheffield Wednesday	10	(0)
2012–2014	Crawley Town	82	(4)
2014–2016	Oldham Athletic	80	(9)
2016–2020	Carlisle United	132	(1)
2020–2022	Barrow	16	(2)
2022–2025	Chesterfield	53	(1)
Total		549	(39)
- * Club domestic league appearances and goals as of 09:47, 20 June 2025 (UTC)

Michael David Jones (born 15 August 1987) is an English former professional footballer who played as a midfielder.

== Career ==
=== Tranmere Rovers ===
Jones progressed through the youth ranks at hometown club Tranmere Rovers. He made his debut on 6 May 2006 in a 2–0 loss to Doncaster Rovers at Prenton Park. He made his first appearance of the following season in a 4–2 FA Cup win against Conference team Woking. On 8 January 2007, Jones signed on loan for League Two team Shrewsbury Town on an initial one-month deal. He made his debut on 13 January and scored as Shrewsbury drew 1–1 away to Lincoln City. The loan deal was extended and he went on to make 14 appearances for Shrewsbury before returning to Tranmere at the end of the season. He made his first appearance of the 2007–08 season in a 1–0 home loss to Morecambe in the Football League Trophy on 4 September 2007. He scored his first goal for Tranmere in what was his final game for the club, in a 3–1 loss against Oldham at Boundary Park on 8 March 2008. He was released by Tranmere at the end of the season.

=== Bury ===
On 30 July 2008 it was announced that Jones would sign for League Two side Bury. He made his debut in a 1–0 win against Brentford at Gigg Lane on 9 August 2008. He scored his first goal for Bury on 18 October 2008 in a 3–1 away win against Dagenham & Redbridge. His second goal came the following month as Bury beat Lancashire rivals Accrington Stanley 2–1 at the Crown Ground. He scored his first goal of 2009 in a 1–0 home win against Barnet on 10 January. His final goal of the season came in a 2–1 win against Rochdale on 7 March. Bury reached the play-offs and were drawn against his former club Shrewsbury in the semi-finals. The tie went to penalties after Bury had won the first leg 1–0, but lost the second leg 1–0 at home. Jones scored his penalty but Bury lost the shoot-out 4–3. He finished the season with 52 appearances and 4 goals.

He scored his first goal of the 2009–10 season against Hereford United in a 3–1 win at Edgar Street. On 3 October he scored in a 1–1 draw against Torquay. He followed this up with a goal in the next game, scoring against former club Tranmere Rovers in a 2–1 win in the Football League Trophy. His next goal came in the next round of the competition, however Bury were eliminated as they lost 3–2 to Accrington, with Jones equalising for Bury to make the score 2–2 at the time. His next goal came against Accrington, this time a 4–2 league win on 28 December. In January 2010, he scored in back-to-back home wins against Bradford City and Hereford United. On 5 April 2010 he was sent off for the first time in his career after receiving a second yellow card in a 3–0 home win against Burton Albion. He ended the season with 7 goals in 45 appearances and helped Bury to a 9th-place finish in the league.

His first goal of the 2010–11 season came against Cheltenham in a 2–0 win at Whaddon Road. He scored in the following game which was a 4–1 win against Morecambe. On 16 October 2010 he scored the winning goal in a 4–3 win against Torquay at Plainmoor. On 30 October he scored a brace as Bury beat Aldershot 3–1. He scored three more goals that season, coming in wins against Burton, Macclesfield and Barnet. Bury were promoted to League One after finishing second in the table. Jones finished the season with 8 goals in 37 appearances.

He began the season well featuring in a 1–1 away draw against Huddersfield Town and a 3–1 League Cup win against Championship side Coventry City. He scored his first goal of the season in a 2–0 win against Wycombe at Adams Park. He scored again the following game in the second round of the League Cup, where Bury lost 4–2 to Championship side Leicester City. He scored his third goal of the season on 19 November in a 4–2 win against Walsall. His final game for Bury was a 2–1 home win against Walsall, on 2 January 2012.

=== Sheffield Wednesday ===
On 12 January 2012, Jones signed for Sheffield Wednesday for an undisclosed fee. Sheffield Wednesday had triggered a release clause in his contract and he signed a two-and-a-half-year deal. He was assigned the squad number 16, and made his debut a day later in a 1–0 loss at home to league leaders Charlton Athletic, starting the game before being substituted by former Bury teammate Ryan Lowe. After promotion to the Football League Championship with Sheffield Wednesday, Jones became out of favour and eventually joined Crawley Town on the summer transfer deadline day, after being with Sheffield Wednesday for only just over six months.

=== Crawley Town ===
Mike Jones joined Crawley Town for an undisclosed fee on 31 August 2012. He made his debut on 1 September in a 1–0 win against Leyton Orient, and assisted the only goal of the game scored by Nicky Ajose. He scored his first goal for the club on 23 April 2013, scoring in a 1–0 win against Preston North End. Jones turned down the offer of a new contract from Crawley, in favour of joining Oldham Athletic despite being a firm favourite of boss John Gregory.

=== Carlisle United ===
On 22 June 2016 Mike Jones joined Carlisle United on a two-year contract. He scored his first goal for Carlisle in an EFL Cup tie against Derby County which Carlisle lost on penalties on 23 August 2016.

He was offered a new contract by Carlisle at the end of the 2018–19 season and signed a one-year extension. Jones left Carlisle in May 2020 at the end of his deal after the league season was brought to an early close due to the coronavirus pandemic.

=== Barrow ===
On 20 July 2020 Jones joined Barrow on a two-year contract, leaving upon its expiry in May 2022.

=== Chesterfield ===
On 2 August 2022, Jones signed for National League club Chesterfield on a one-year deal having impressed on trial.

On 18 June 2025, Jones announced his retirement from football.

== Career statistics ==
As of end of 2024–25 season

Appearances and goals by club, season and competition
Club	Season	League			FA Cup		League Cup		Other		Total	
Club	Season	Division	Apps	Goals	Apps	Goals	Apps	Goals	Apps	Goals	Apps	Goals
Tranmere Rovers	2005–06	League One	1	0	0	0	0	0	0	0	1	0
Tranmere Rovers	2006–07	League One	0	0	1	0	0	0	0	0	1	0
Tranmere Rovers	2007–08	League One	9	1	1	0	0	0	1 (Note: Appearance(s) in Football League Trophy)	0	11	1
Tranmere Rovers	Total		10	1	2	0	0	0	1	0	13	1
Shrewsbury Town (loan)	2006–07	League One	13	1	—		0	0	1	0	14	1
Bury	2008–09	League Two	48	4	1	0	1	0	2	0	52	4
Bury	2009–10	League Two	41	5	1	0	1	0	2	2	45	7
Bury	2010–11	League Two	35	8	2	0	0	0	0	0	37	8
Bury	2011–12	League One	21	3	1	0	2	1	1	0	25	4
Bury	Total		145	20	5	0	4	1	5	2	159	23
Sheffield Wednesday	2011–12	League One	10	0	—		—		—		10	0
Sheffield Wednesday	2012–13	Championship	0	0	0	0	1	0	—		1	0
Sheffield Wednesday	Total		10	0	0	0	1	0	0	0	11	0
Crawley Town	2012–13	League One	40	1	3	0	—		2	0	45	1
Crawley Town	2013–14	League One	42	3	2	0	1	0	1	1	46	4
Crawley Town	Total		82	4	5	0	1	0	3	1	91	5
Oldham Athletic	2014–15	League One	45	6	1	1	0	0	3	0	49	7
Oldham Athletic	2015–16	League One	35	3	1	0	0	0	1	0	37	3
Oldham Athletic	Total		80	34	4	3	2	1	4	0	86	38
Carlisle United	2016–17	League Two	28	0	2	0	2	1	1 (Note: Appearance(s) in EFL Trophy)	0	33	1
Carlisle United	2017–18	League Two	43	0	5	0	2	0	3	0	53	0
Carlisle United	2018–19	League Two	24	1	2	0	0	0	2	0	28	1
Carlisle United	2019–20	League Two	37	0	5	1	2	0	0	0	44	1
Carlisle United	Total		132	1	14	1	6	1	6	0	158	3
Barrow	2020–21	League Two	13	2	0	0	1	0	0	0	14	2
Barrow	2021–22	League Two	3	0	0	0	0	0	1	0	4	0
Barrow	Total		16	2	0	0	1	0	1	0	18	2
Chesterfield	2022–23	National League	27	0	5	0	—		2	0	34	0
Chesterfield	2023–24	National League	24	1	3	0	—		0	0	27	1
Chesterfield	2024–25	League Two	2	0	0	0	0	0	3	0	5	0
Chesterfield	Total		53	1	8	0	0	0	5	0	66	1
Career total			541	39	36	2	13	2	26	3	616	46

== Honours ==
Bury

- Football League Two second-place promotion: 2010–11

Sheffield Wednesday

- Football League One second-place promotion: 2011–12

Chesterfield

- National League: 2023–24
