= Aaron Grundy =

English footballer (born 1988)

Personal information
- Date of birth: 21 January 1988 (age 38)
- Place of birth: Bolton, England
- Height: 6 ft 2 in (1.88 m)
- Position: Goalkeeper

Youth career
- 1997–2005: Bury

Senior career*
Years	Team	Apps	(Gls)
2005–2008	Bury	2	(0)
2008	→ FC United of Manchester (loan)	6	(0)
2008	Burscough	0	(0)
2009	Cambridge United	0	(0)
2009	Fleetwood Town	0	(0)
2010–	Chorley	21	(0)
- * Club domestic league appearances and goals as of 20:02, 18 April 2010

Aaron Grundy (born 21 January 1988) is an English footballer who plays for Chorley.

== Career ==
=== Bury ===
Grundy began his career in the youth academy at Bury in 1997, progressing the reserve side. He made his first team début on 18 October 2005 in the first round of the Football League Trophy against Halifax Town, which Bury lost 6–1, as a 16th minute substitute, replacing striker Tom Youngs, after keeper Craig Dootson had been sent off. He made his league debut later on that same season, replacing the injured Dootson as an 86th-minute substitute in a 0–0 a draw with Barnet.

In the 2006–07 season, he made four appearances for the Shakers.

He joined FC United of Manchester on a short-term loan in February 2008 after an injury to their regular first-team goalkeeper Sam Ashton ruled him out for a few weeks. Grundy was awarded with fans player of the month and also received the leagues goalkeeper of the month after a successful spell with the Red Rebels.

He made a total of six appearances for Bury in his three years with the first team.

=== Move to non-league football ===
In August 2008, Grundy signed for Conference North side Burscough but rarely featured for the club and was subsequently released. On 1 March 2009 he signed for Conference National side Cambridge United on non-contract terms.

After a successful trial period, Grundy signed for Conference North side Fleetwood Town on 1 August 2009. He made his debut later that day in a pre-season friendly against his former club Bury.

In the summer of 2010, he joined Chorley He was released in June 2011.

In the summer of 2013 he re-joined Chorley F.C, and was part of Chorley F.C 's 2013/14 Northern Premier League title winning squad. Aaron was chosen in place of Sam Ashton for all cup competitions after impressing in training. He guided them to the Lancashire FA Challenge Trophy Final which was played at the Reebok Stadium.
