= Brian Barry-Murphy =

Irish football player and manager (born 1978)

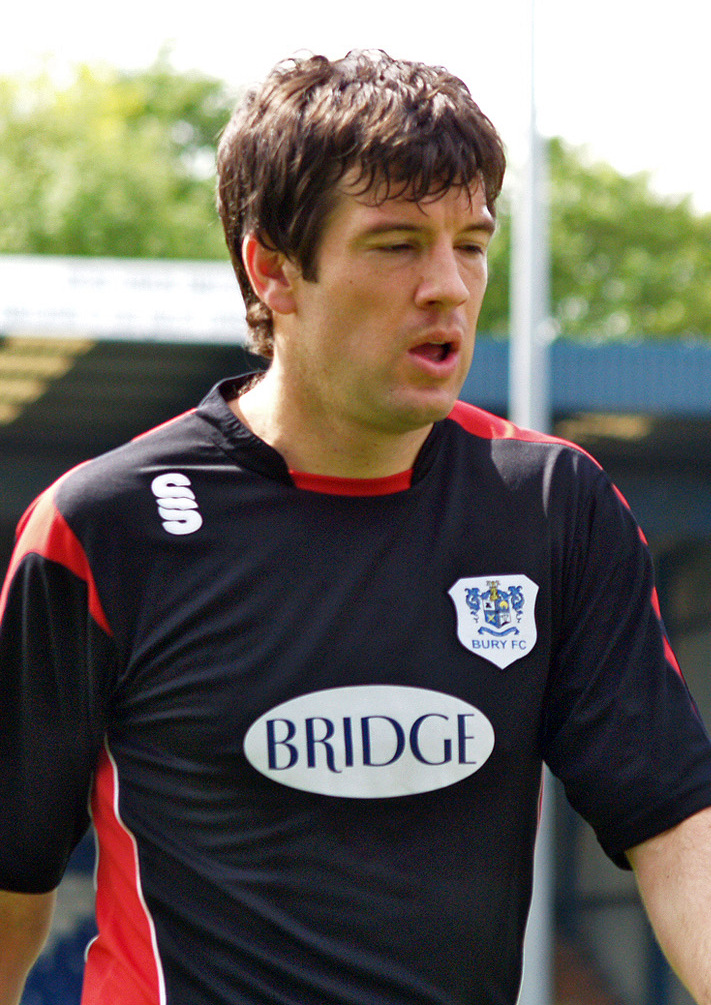
- Barry-Murphy playing for Bury in 2009

Personal information
- Full name: Brian Barry-Murphy
- Date of birth: 27 July 1978 (age 48)
- Place of birth: Cork, Ireland
- Height: 1.80 m (5 ft 11 in)
- Position: Defensive midfielder

Team information
- Current team: Cardiff City (head coach)

Senior career*
Years	Team	Apps	(Gls)
1995–1999	Cork City		
1999–2003	Preston North End	21	(0)
2002	→ Southend United (loan)	8	(1)
2002	→ Hartlepool United (loan)	7	(0)
2003–2004	Sheffield Wednesday	58	(0)
2004–2010	Bury	218	(13)
2010–2018	Rochdale	66	(1)
Total		378	(15)

International career
2003–2004	Republic of Ireland U21	2	(0)

Managerial career
- 2019–2021: Rochdale
- 2025–: Cardiff City
- * Club domestic league appearances and goals

Brian Barry-Murphy (born 27 July 1978) is an Irish professional football manager and former player who is the head coach of EFL Championship club Cardiff City.

A defensive midfielder, Barry-Murphy began his career at his hometown club Cork City. In 1999, he moved to English club Preston North End, but began to establish himself in league football with loan spells at Southend United and Hartlepool United. He would go on to play for Sheffield Wednesday, and Bury before signing for local rivals Rochdale in 2010. Barry-Murphy also played for the Republic of Ireland twice at under-21 level.

== Early life ==
Barry-Murphy was born in Cork. His father, Jimmy, was a Gaelic footballer and hurler, and manager, who is widely considered to be one of the most iconic players in the history of Gaelic games.

== Club career ==
Brian Barry-Murphy has previously played for Cork City, Preston North End and Sheffield Wednesday as well as representing the Republic of Ireland at Under 21 level. He also had loan spells at Southend United and Hartlepool United. He scored his first goal in English football in a game for Southend against Leyton Orient. He scored the 1,000th goal for Bury in Tier 4 of the English Football League in a 2–2 draw with Wrexham.

On 16 June 2010 Barry-Murphy agreed terms with Rochdale and signed a four-year contract in July. He scored his first and only goal for Rochdale in a 3–1 defeat at MK Dons on 5 November 2011. Barry-Murphy was the club's first team coach, as well as retaining his registration as the club's senior outfield player.

== Coaching career ==
=== Rochdale ===
Barry-Murphy was appointed Rochdale's caretaker manager in March 2019 following the dismissal of Keith Hill. In April 2019, Barry-Murphy was appointed permanent manager on a two-year contract. He resigned from his position as manager on 30 June 2021.

=== Manchester City Academy ===
On 24 July 2021, Barry-Murphy was announced as the manager of the Manchester City Elite Development Squad (EDS).

On 8 July 2024, Barry-Murphy left the club after a successful three-year spell in charge of City's EDS and Academy.

=== Leicester City ===
In December 2024, Barry-Murphy joined Premier League side Leicester City in the role of first-team coach, supporting the newly appointed Ruud van Nistelrooy.

=== Cardiff City ===
On 16 June 2025, Barry-Murphy was appointed head coach of League One side Cardiff City on a three-year deal. Sixteen points from an unbeaten first six matches saw him named EFL League One Manager of the Month for August 2025. He won the award for a second time for December, after five wins from six matches saw Cardiff finish the calendar year top of the table. On 18 April 2026, Cardiff were promoted to the EFL Championship after a 3–1 away win against Reading confirmed automatic promotion.

== Career statistics ==
Appearances and goals by club, season and competition
Club	Season	League			FA Cup		EFL Cup		Other		Total	
Club	Season	Division	Apps	Goals	Apps	Goals	Apps	Goals	Apps	Goals	Apps	Goals
Preston North End	1999–2000	Second Division	1	0	0	0	1	0	1 (Note: Appearance(s) in Football League Trophy / EFL Trophy)	0	3	0
Preston North End	2000–01	First Division	14	0	1	0	3	0	—		18	0
Preston North End	2001–02	First Division	4	0	1	0	0	0	—		5	0
Preston North End	2002–03	First Division	2	0	0	0	0	0	—		2	0
Preston North End	Total		21	0	2	0	4	0	1	0	28	0
Southend United (loan)	2001–02	Third Division	8	1	0	0	0	0	0	0	8	1
Hartlepool United (loan)	2002–03	Third Division	7	0	2	0	0	0	0	0	9	0
Sheffield Wednesday	2002–03	First Division	17	0	0	0	0	0	—		17	0
Sheffield Wednesday	2003–04	Second Division	41	0	2	0	1	0	6	0	50	0
Sheffield Wednesday	Total		58	0	2	0	1	0	6	0	67	0
Bury	2004–05	League Two	45	6	2	0	1	0	1	0	49	6
Bury	2005–06	League Two	40	3	0	0	1	0	0	0	41	3
Bury	2006–07	League Two	14	0	1	0	1	0	1	0	17	0
Bury	2007–08	League Two	31	1	4	0	1	0	3	0	39	1
Bury	2008–09	League Two	42	2	1	0	1	0	4 (Note: Two appearances in Football League Trophy, two appearances in League Two play-offs)	0	48	2
Bury	2009–10	League Two	46	1	1	0	1	0	3	0	51	1
Bury	Total		218	13	9	0	6	0	12	0	245	13
Rochdale	2010–11	League One	32	0	1	0	2	0	1	0	36	0
Rochdale	2011–12	League One	22	1	1	0	1	0	2	0	26	1
Rochdale	2012–13	League Two	8	0	0	0	0	0	1	0	9	0
Rochdale	2013–14	League Two	3	0	0	0	0	0	0	0	3	0
Rochdale	2014–15	League One	0	0	0	0	0	0	0	0	0	0
Rochdale	2015–16	League One	1	0	0	0	0	0	1	0	2	0
Rochdale	2016–17	League One	0	0	0	0	0	0	1	0	1	0
Rochdale	2017–18	League One	0	0	0	0	0	0	0	0	0	0
Rochdale	Total		66	1	2	0	3	0	6	0	77	1
Career total			378	15	17	0	14	0	25	0	434	15

== Managerial statistics ==
As of match played 21 November 2026

Managerial record by team and tenure
Team	From	To	Record					Ref.
Team	From	To	P	W	D	L	Win %	Ref.
Rochdale	4 March 2019	30 June 2021	109	34	28	47	31.2	
Cardiff City	16 June 2025	Present	74	38	16	20	51.4	
Total			183	72	44	67	39.3	

== Honours ==
Individual

- EFL League One Manager of the Month: August 2025, December 2025

Manager

Cardiff City

- EFL League One runner-up: 2025-26

== Personal life ==
Barry-Murphy is married to the broadcaster Sarah-Jane Crawford. They have three children together.
