= Paul Scott (footballer, born 1979) =

English footballer

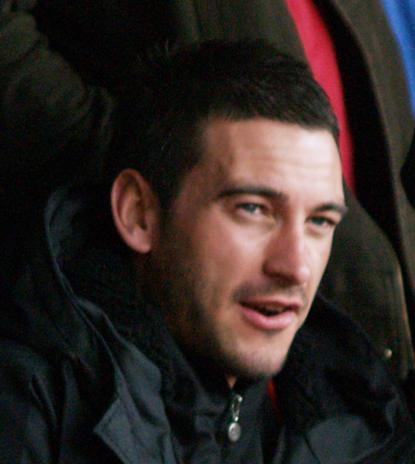

Personal information
- Full name: Paul Scott
- Date of birth: 5 November 1979 (age 47)
- Place of birth: Wakefield, England
- Position: Right back

Senior career*
Years	Team	Apps	(Gls)
1997–2004	Huddersfield Town	32	(2)
2004–2010	Bury	213	(13)
2010–2012	Morecambe	8	(0)
2012–2018	Wakefield City	71	(14)
Total		324	(29)
- * Club domestic league appearances and goals

Paul Scott (born 5 November 1979, in Wakefield) is an English former professional footballer who played in the Football League with Huddersfield Town, Bury and Morecambe.

== Playing career ==
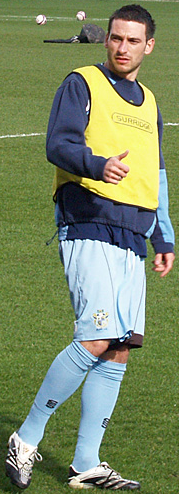
Scott in a Bury pre-match warm up (March 2008).

=== Huddersfield Town ===
Beginning his career as a trainee at Huddersfield Town, Scott made his debut in a 1–0 win at Peterborough United on 17 August 2002.

Scott left Huddersfield in 2004 after making 32 league appearances and scoring two goals.

=== Bury ===
Scott initially joined Bury on non-contract terms after personally applying for a trial at the club. He made his debut on 21 August 2004 in a 1–1 draw against Chester City. Scott established himself as a regular in Bury's starting side towards the end of the 2004–05 season after signing a permanent contract.

During his time at the club he featured at right-back, centre-back and even central midfield.

He won Bury's Player of the Season award in both 2007 and 2008.

=== Morecambe ===
Scott signed a two-year contract with Morecambe in June 2010. Unfortunately, Scott spent much of his time with The Shrimps suffering from long term injury problems. As a result, his contract was mutually terminated early in April 2012.

=== Wakefield City ===
Scott subsequently played non-league football with hometown club Wakefield City.

== Personal life ==
In 2010, Scott was studying part-time for a bachelor's degree in Sports Performance at the University of Salford.

== Career statistics ==
Appearances and goals by club, season and competition
Club	Season	League			FA Cup		League Cup		Other		Total	
Club	Season	Division	Apps	Goals	Apps	Goals	Apps	Goals	Apps	Goals	Apps	Goals
Huddersfield Town	2002–03	Division Two	13	0	0	0	1	0	0	0	14	0
Huddersfield Town	2003–04	Division Three	19	2	1	0	1	0	2 (Note: One appearance in Football League Trophy, one appearance in Division Three play-offs)	0	23	2
Huddersfield Town	Total		32	2	1	0	2	0	2	0	37	2
Bury	2004–05	League Two	23	0	1	0	1	0	1 (Note: Appearances in Football League Trophy)	1	26	1
Bury	2005–06	League Two	41	2	2	1	1	0	1	0	45	3
Bury	2006–07	League Two	46	2	4	0	2	0	0	0	52	2
Bury	2007–08	League Two	40	6	4	1	1	0	2	0	47	7
Bury	2008–09	League Two	33	3	1	0	1	0	2	0	37	3
Bury	2009–10	League Two	30	0	1	0	1	0	2	0	34	0
Bury	Total		213	13	13	2	7	0	8	1	241	16
Morecambe	2010–11	League Two	8	0	0	0	2	0	0	0	10	0
Morecambe	2011–12	League Two	0	0	0	0	0	0	0	0	0	0
Morecambe	Total		8	0	0	0	2	0	0	0	10	0
Wakefield City	2012–13	West Riding County League Division One	8	3	—		—		0	0	8	3
Wakefield City	2013–14	West Riding County League Division One	18	5	—		—		6 (Note: Four appearances one goal in West Riding County League Division One Cup, two appearances in Wakefield & District FA Cup)	1	24	6
Wakefield City	2014–15	West Riding County League Division One	21	4	—		—		6 (Note: Four appearances two goals in West Riding County League Division One Cup, two appearances one goal in Wakefield & District FA Cup)	3	27	7
Wakefield City	2015–16	—			—		—		0	0	0	0
Wakefield City	2016–17	West Riding County League Division One	18	2	—		—		4 (Note: One appearance in West Riding County League Division One Cup, three appearances one goal in Wakefield & District FA Cup)	1	22	3
Wakefield City	2017–18	West Riding County League Premier Division	6	0	—		—		4 (Note: One appearance in West Riding County League Premier Division Cup, three appearances one goal in Wakefield & District FA Cup)	1	10	1
Wakefield City	Total		71	14	—		—		20	6	91	20
Career total			324	29	14	2	11	0	30	7	379	38

== Honours ==
Wakefield City

- West Riding County League Division One: 2014–15
- West Riding County League Division One Cup: 2013–14

Individual

- Bury Player of the Season: 2006–07, 2007–08
