= Glynn Hurst =

Footballer (born 1976)

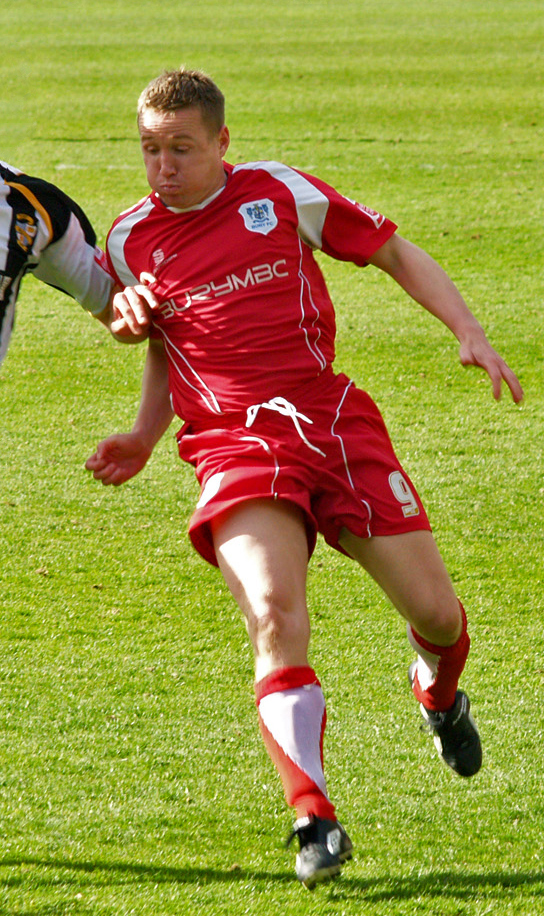
- Hurst in 2009 with Bury

Personal information
- Full name: Glynn Hurst
- Date of birth: 17 January 1976 (age 50)
- Place of birth: Barnsley, England
- Height: 5 ft 10 in (1.78 m)
- Position: Striker

Youth career
- 1993–1994: Tottenham Hotspur

Senior career*
Years	Team	Apps	(Gls)
1994–1997	Barnsley	8	(0)
1996	→ Swansea City (loan)	2	(1)
1997	→ Mansfield Town (loan)	6	(0)
1997–1998	Emley	15	(12)
1998–2001	Ayr United	78	(49)
2001	Stockport County	26	(4)
2001–2004	Chesterfield	84	(29)
2004–2006	Notts County	59	(23)
2006–2007	Shrewsbury Town	16	(3)
2006–2007	→ Bury (loan)	15	(7)
2007–2009	Bury	96	(17)
2009	Gainsborough Trinity	5	(2)
2009–2010	Hyde	6	(0)
2010–2011	FC United of Manchester	14	(10)

International career
	South Africa U23	5	(0)

Managerial career
- 2020: Ashton Town
- 2026: Pilkington
- * Club domestic league appearances and goals

Glynn Hurst (born 16 January 1976) is a former professional association footballer who played as a striker. He played in the Football League for Barnsley, Swansea City, Mansfield Town, Stockport County, Chesterfield, Notts County, Shrewsbury Town and Bury, and in the Scottish Football League for Ayr United. Born in England, he won five caps for the South Africa U23 team.

After retiring from football he became a teacher and managed non-League club Ashton Town.

== Early and personal life ==
Born in Barnsley, South Yorkshire, Hurst moved to South Africa at a young age. Glynn is now a Geography teacher at Maghull High School

== Playing career ==
=== Early career ===
Hurst started his career as a Tottenham Hotspur apprentice, but could not break into the first team. He joined Barnsley in 1994, where he was sent out on loan to many clubs including Swansea City, Scarborough, and Mansfield Town.

In 1997, he dropped out of the professional game and had a spell at Emley in the Northern Premier League. Since then he has played for Ayr United and Stockport County, and was top goalscorer for Chesterfield with 20 goals in all. After Chesterfield, Hurst played for Notts County where he was the club's top goalscorer with 15 goals in the 2004–05 season. Despite having scored nine goals in the 2005–06 season, Hurst was released from his Notts County contract on 29 December 2005.

He joined Shrewsbury days later. After scoring on his Shrewsbury debut against cross-border rivals Wrexham, Hurst scored twice more in fifteen further matches before the season's end. An injury-hit pre-season saw Hurst have back and achilles problems and lose his place in the team at the start of 2006–07.

=== Shrewsbury Town ===
By late September he had yet to return to the first-team, and as a result Shrewsbury sent him on loan to Bury for a month, in the hope of his regaining match fitness and goalscoring form.

=== Bury ===
Hurst's Bury debut saw him hit two goals against Barnet in a 2–2 draw. After accumulating five goals in five league games, on 26 October 2006, the loan was extended until January 2007. An undisclosed transfer fee has been agreed for Hurst who, in the January 2007 transfer window, signed a permanent contract lasting until the end of 2007–08. note. On 18 May, it was announced that Glynn has been released by Bury at the end of his contract.

=== Gainsborough Trinity ===
Despite being linked with a move to Wrexham and playing a couple of pre season friendlies for Chester City, Hurst eventually signed for non-League outfit Gainsborough Trinity, scoring on his debut.

=== Hyde ===
On 4 December 2009, he joined Conference North outfit Hyde United. He made his debut on 12 December 2009 in a 4–0 away defeat to Alfreton Town in the Conference North. In February 2010 Hyde announced that he would become their assistant manager after former assistant boss Gerry Harrison left earlier that month. On 10 September 2010 Hurst parted ways with Hyde to try to resurrect his playing career, which he was not able to do with them.

=== FC United of Manchester ===
Hurst signed for FC United of Manchester after watching them in a 3–0 victory over Radcliffe Borough in the FA Cup, on 11 September 2010. He scored for the club on his debut the following weekend. Hurst retired on 8 January 2011.

=== International career ===
Hurst represented the South Africa U23. earning a total of five caps.

== Coaching career ==
After retiring from playing, Hurst became a philosophy, RE and PE teacher, also coaching the school football team. In 2019 he became reserve team coach of Marine.

In May 2020 Hurst was appointed manager of North West Counties League club Ashton Town. He resigned from the role in October.

On 13 November 2022, Hurst was appointed Bootle Reserve team coach.

From January to March 2026, Hurst had a brief spell in charge of Pilkington
