= Andy Morrell =

English football player and manager

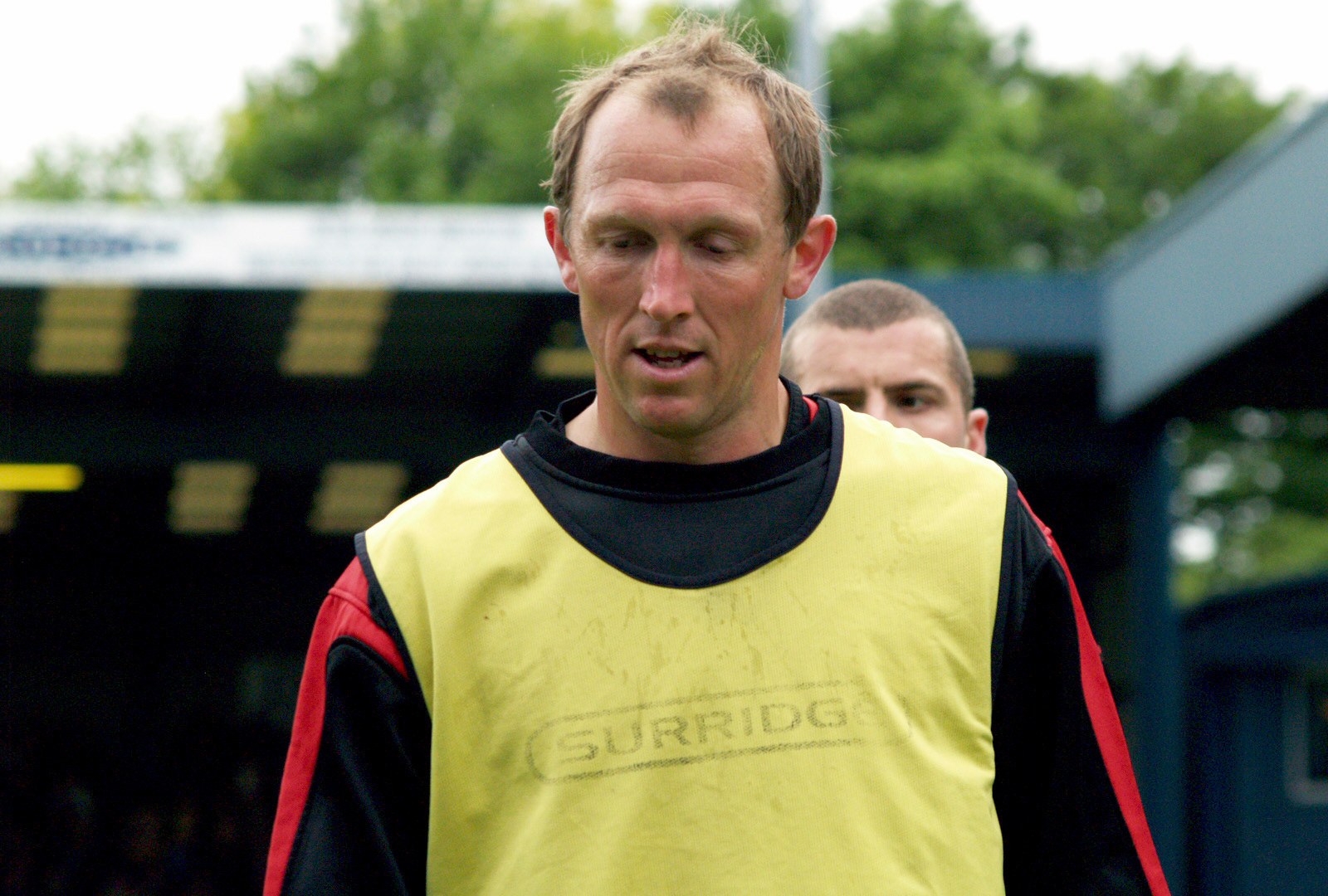
- Morrell in 2009

Personal information
- Full name: Andrew Jonathan Morrell
- Date of birth: 28 September 1974 (age 52)
- Place of birth: Doncaster, England
- Height: 5 ft 11 in (1.80 m)
- Position: Striker

Youth career
- Nuneaton Borough

Senior career*
Years	Team	Apps	(Gls)
1997–1998	Newcastle Blue Star		
1998–2003	Wrexham	109	(40)
2003–2006	Coventry City	98	(17)
2006–2008	Blackpool	78	(21)
2008–2010	Bury	73	(18)
2010–2014	Wrexham	113	(25)
2014–2018	Tamworth	28	(4)
2018	Redditch United	1	(1)

Managerial career
- 2011–2014: Wrexham
- 2014–2018: Tamworth
- 2020: Hednesford Town
- * Club domestic league appearances and goals

Andrew Jonathan Morrell (born 28 September 1974) is an English former professional footballer. A striker, Morrell played 359 games in the Football League for Wrexham, Coventry City, Blackpool and Bury, scoring 96 goals.

Initially handed the manager's role on an interim basis at Wrexham, after Dean Saunders left to manage Doncaster Rovers, Morrell was given the job until the end of the season after a run of seven wins in nine games, he continued his playing career serving as a player-manager, leaving the position in February 2014 after two and a half years as manager with a win record at over 52%.

Morrell has also served as assistant manager at Shrewsbury Town.

== Career ==
=== Newcastle Blue Star ===
Born in Doncaster, South Yorkshire, and brought up in Market Bosworth, and attending Twycross House School, he played for the Leicestershire County Cricket Club from under-15 to under-19 level. He started his football career as a youth team player at Nuneaton Borough, before deciding to make the move north to Northumbria University, Newcastle upon Tyne to study Sports science. It was then that he started playing for Newcastle Blue Star making 31 appearances scoring 25 times in his season.

=== Wrexham ===
Morrell's first big break came when he started talking to Sky Sports presenter Rob McCaffrey, who was helping to write the autobiography of Joey Jones, Wrexham's first-team coach at the time. McCaffrey arranged for Morrell to have a trial at the club. After a week's trial he was kept on at Wrexham and was coached by their striking coach Ian Rush, from whom he learnt a great deal. With his new strike partner Lee Trundle he scored 34 league goals in 45 games in the 2002–03 season, making him top scorer in all four divisions that year, having only scored two goals the entire previous season.

=== Coventry City ===
After a very impressive spell with Wrexham, Morrell caught the eye of Coventry City manager Gary McAllister, who signed him on a free transfer in the summer of 2003. Morrell scored nine goals in 19 starts in his first season with Coventry; however, this decreased to six goals the following season following a transition to a wide midfield position. McAllister's replacement, Micky Adams, told Morrell he would be a squad player. Morrell challenged himself to make the first team, working hard in pre-season to make himself as fit as possible. Morrell was not named in the matchday squads for the first three games of the 2006–07 season.

=== Blackpool ===
Blackpool manager Simon Grayson contacted Micky Adams about Morrell's availability, and the striker was allowed to discuss a possible move. Morrell signed for Blackpool on a free transfer on 15 August 2006. He initially struggled to hold a place in the team, but on 16 September he scored his first goal for the club, a last-minute equaliser in a 2–2 draw at home to Oldham Athletic which began a run of consistent appearances.

On 5 May 2007, he scored four goals in Blackpool's 6–3 victory at Swansea City. He also scored against Oldham Athletic in the second leg of the play-off semi-final, which put his league goals in his nine months with Blackpool at 17, which was the total he scored in three years with Coventry. He finished the 2006–07 season as Blackpool's top scorer with 20 goals in all competitions.

=== Bury ===
On 7 May 2008, Morrell was offered a new contract by Blackpool, but with the form of Ben Burgess and Paul Dickov, Morrell declined the offer. He joined Bury on 9 August, signing a two-year contract with the League Two club. In his two seasons at Gigg Lane, Morrell made 78 appearances and scored 18 goals.

=== Return to Wrexham and start of managerial career ===
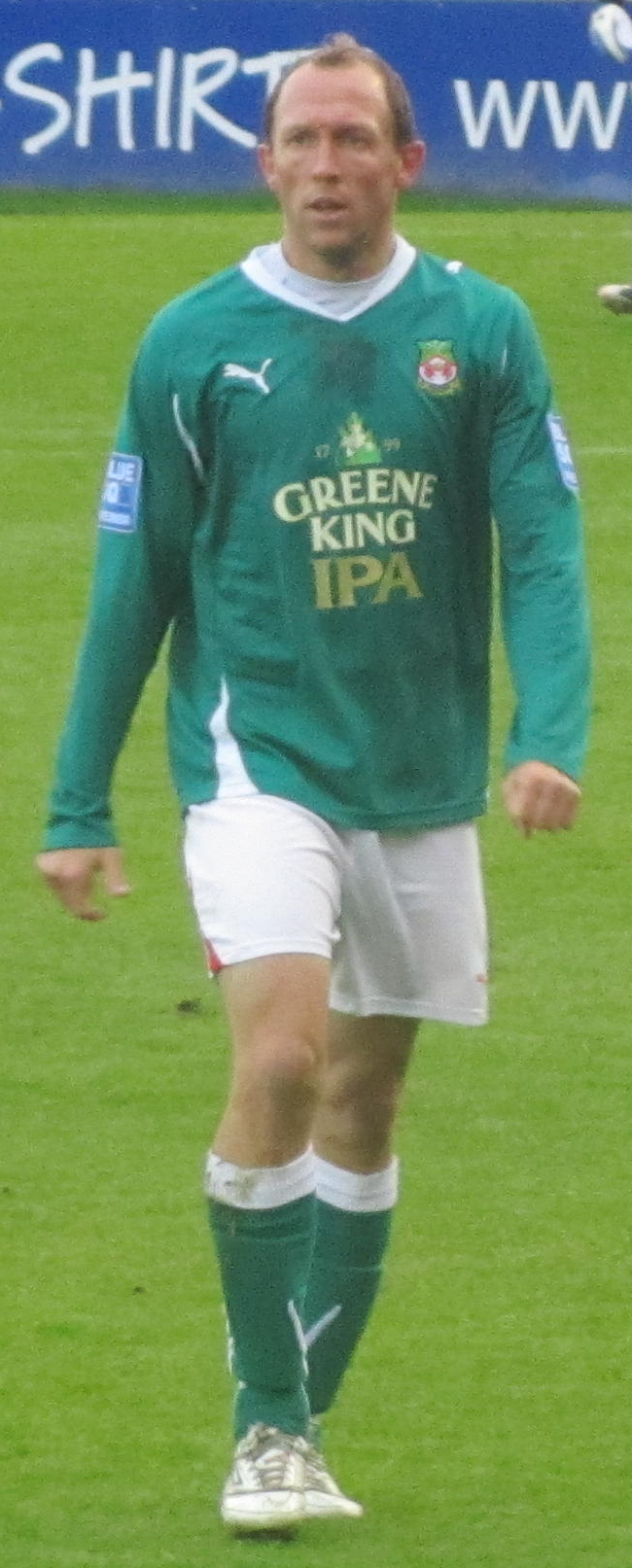
Morrell playing for Wrexham in 2011

After his two seasons with Bury, Morrell left the club and on 28 June 2010, and signed a two-year contract with his former club Wrexham. Morrell scored the winning goal on his debut, a 1–0 win over Cambridge United in the first game of the season. Morrell took a major part in Wrexham's first team and played in the Conference Play-off semi-finals of the 2010–11 season but lost to rivals Luton Town.

On 23 September 2011, Morrell took over as caretaker player-manager at Wrexham, following the departure of Dean Saunders to Doncaster Rovers. After leading Wrexham to seven wins in nine games, he was appointed player-manager on a permanent basis on a contract until the end of the 2011–12 season on 29 October. During his first season as Wrexham manager he led the reds to an FA Cup 3rd round match against Championship side Brighton & Hove Albion, with Wrexham taking the Albion to a replay in front of a packed Racecourse Ground. Wrexham lost the game on penalties 5–4 with Brighton keeper Peter Brezovan saving the first penalty taken by Wrexham captain Dean Keates. Also Morrell guided Wrexham to the Play-offs after narrowly missing out on automatic promotion to Fleetwood Town even after gaining 98 points in the season. Morrell's side lost in the semi-final for the second year running once again to Luton Town who went on to lose to York City in the final.

In April 2012, Morrell signed a new two-year deal with Wrexham, one year as a player then an additional year as manager, working alongside assistant and goalkeeper coach Michael Oakes and Assistant Billy Barr. In 2013 Morrell led his Wrexham team to Wembley on two occasions. The first against Grimsby Town, in the FA Trophy Final. Wrexham won the game on penalties after it finished 1–1 after extra time. The second occasion was for the Conference Play Off Final. Wrexham had beaten Kidderminster harriers 5–2 on aggregate to get to the final, but were beaten by fellow Welsh side Newport County 2–0. The following season began terribly for Morrell's Wrexham which saw them in the bottom half for most of the first half of the 2013–14 campaign, Morrell decided not to play in most games although on 23 November he came on as a sub in the first half for injured Brett Ormerod and scored a fantastic volley and earned the man of the match award against Forest Green Rovers.

On 23 February 2014, Morrell left his position as manager of Wrexham FC by mutual consent after a meeting with the board members, leaving the club after four years as a player, and two and a half years as player-manager.

=== Shrewsbury Town ===
Morrell was appointed as assistant manager to his former Blackpool teammate Mike Jackson at Shrewsbury Town on 7 March 2014, on a deal that ran until the end of the season. Following the club's relegation to League Two, Morrell left the club, with Jackson assuming assistant duties under new manager Micky Mellon.

=== Tamworth ===
On 23 September 2014, Morrell made his return to football management by taking over at Conference North side Tamworth. He took over the side and quickly turned around their league campaign by taking them to the play-off spots, to the delight of the fans. He also played regularly for them, contrary of the previous seasons lack of games.

=== Redditch United ===
In February 2018, Morrell departed Tamworth. Later in the same month, he joined Redditch United, scoring on his début in a 4–2 win over Gosport Borough on 20 February.

=== Hednesford Town ===
Morrell was appointed manager of Hednesford Town in April 2020. He was sacked in October of that year after three defeats and a draw from the opening four games of the season.

== Career statistics ==
Appearances and goals by club, season and competition
Club	Season	League		FA Cup		League Cup		Other (Note: Includes Football League Trophy and play-offs.)		Total	
Club	Season	Apps	Goals	Apps	Goals	Apps	Goals	Apps	Goals	Apps	Goals
Wrexham	1998–99	7	0	0	0	0	0	1	0	8	0
Wrexham	1999–2000	13	1	1	0	0	0	1	0	15	1
Wrexham	2000–01	20	3	0	0	1	0	0	0	21	3
Wrexham	2001–02	24	2	1	0	0	0	2	2	27	4
Wrexham	2002–03	45	34	1	0	2	1	1	0	49	35
Wrexham	Total	109	40	3	0	3	1	5	2	120	43
Coventry City	2003–04	30	9	2	0	2	0	0	0	34	9
Coventry City	2004–05	34	6	2	0	2	1	0	0	38	7
Coventry City	2005–06	34	2	3	0	2	1	0	0	39	3
Coventry City	Total	98	17	7	0	6	2	0	0	111	19
Blackpool	2006–07	40	16	4	3	1	0	3	1	48	20
Blackpool	2007–08	38	5	1	0	4	0	0	0	43	5
Blackpool	Total	78	21	5	3	5	0	3	1	91	25
Bury	2008–09	41	9	1	0	1	0	3	0	46	8
Bury	2009–10	32	9	0	0	0	0	1	0	33	9
Bury	Total	73	18	1	0	1	0	4	0	79	18
Wrexham	2010–11	41	10	0	0	0	0	0	0	41	10
Wrexham	2011–12	44	10	5	3	0	0	2	1	51	14
Wrexham	2012–13	24	4	1	0	0	0	3	0	28	4
Wrexham	2013–14	6	1	1	0	0	0	0	0	7	1
Wrexham	Total	115	25	7	3	0	0	5	1	127	29
Total		473	121	23	6	15	3	17	4	528	134

== Managerial statistics ==
As of 3 February 2018

Team	From	To	Record					
Team	From	To	G	W	D	L	Win %	Ref.
Wrexham	23 September 2011	24 February 2014	140	73	31	36	52.14	
Tamworth	23 September 2014	7 February 2018	198	89	48	61	44.95	
Total			338	163	78	97	48.22	—

== Honours ==
=== Player ===
Blackpool

- Football League One play-offs: 2007

Individual

- PFA Team of the Year: 2002–03 Third Division

=== Manager ===
Wrexham

- FA Trophy: 2012–13

Individual

- Conference Premier Manager of the Month: October 2011
- Conference North Manager of the Month: December 2014
