= Jack Dorney =

English footballer (born 1990)

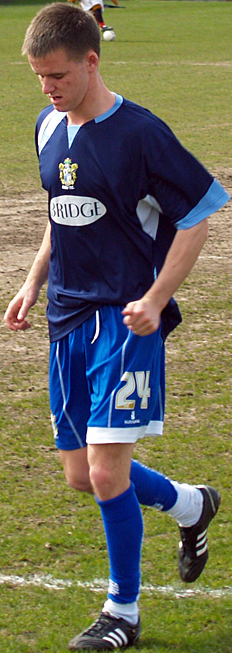

Personal information
- Full name: Jack Christopher Dorney
- Date of birth: 9 January 1990 (age 36)
- Place of birth: Ashton-under-Lyne, England
- Height: 5 ft 8 in (1.73 m)
- Position: Midfielder

Team information
- Current team: Atherton Collieries

Youth career
- –2007: Bury

Senior career*
Years	Team	Apps	(Gls)
2007–2009	Bury	11	(0)
2009	→ Leigh Genesis (loan)	7	(2)
2009–2010	Leigh Genesis	40	(7)
2010–2011	Chorley	35	(20)
2011–2012	FC Halifax Town		
2012–2013	Woodley Sports		
2013–2014	AFC Fylde		
2014–2015	Chorley	8	(3)
2015–2016	Trafford		
2016	Chorley		
2016–2017	Ashton United		
2017–2019	Trafford		
2019	Droylsden		
2019–2020	Northwich Victoria	11	(0)
2020–2023	Trafford		
2023–2024	Clitheroe		
2024–	Atherton Collieries		
- * Club domestic league appearances and goals

Jack Christopher Dorney (born 9 January 1990) is an English footballer who plays as a midfielder for Atherton Collieries.

== Career ==
=== Bury ===
Born in Ashton-under-Lyne, Greater Manchester, Dorney started his career with the Bury youth system and in 2007 and made his first team debut in a 3–1 defeat against Chesterfield on 7 September 2007. He signed a two-and-a-half-year professional contract with Bury in November.

==== Leigh Genesis (loan) ====
He joined Leigh Genesis on loan on 26 March 2009.

=== Leigh Genesis ===
After being released by Bury he joined Leigh permanently.

=== Chorley ===
He signed for Chorley in May 2010. Dorney scored 20 goals during Chorley's 2010–11 promotion, his 20th goal coming as the clincher during Chorley's playoff final victory over AFC Fylde. Despite being instrumental to Chorley's promotion Dorney was let go at the end of the season.

=== FC Halifax Town ===
He then joined FC Halifax Town.

=== Woodley Sports / Stockport Sports ===
He joined Woodley Sports in July 2011.

=== AFC Fylde ===
He then joined AFC Fylde.

=== Chorley ===
Dorney rejoined Chorley in January 2014.

=== Trafford ===
In August 2015 he joined Trafford.

=== Chorley ===
In February 2016 he returned again to Chorley.

=== Ashton United ===
In summer of 2016 he moved to Ashton United.

=== Trafford ===
In January 2017 he rejoined Trafford.

=== Northwich Victoria ===
After two and a half months at Droylsden F.C., Dorney joined Northwich Victoria on 29 October 2019.
