= Efe Sodje =

Association football player (born 1972)

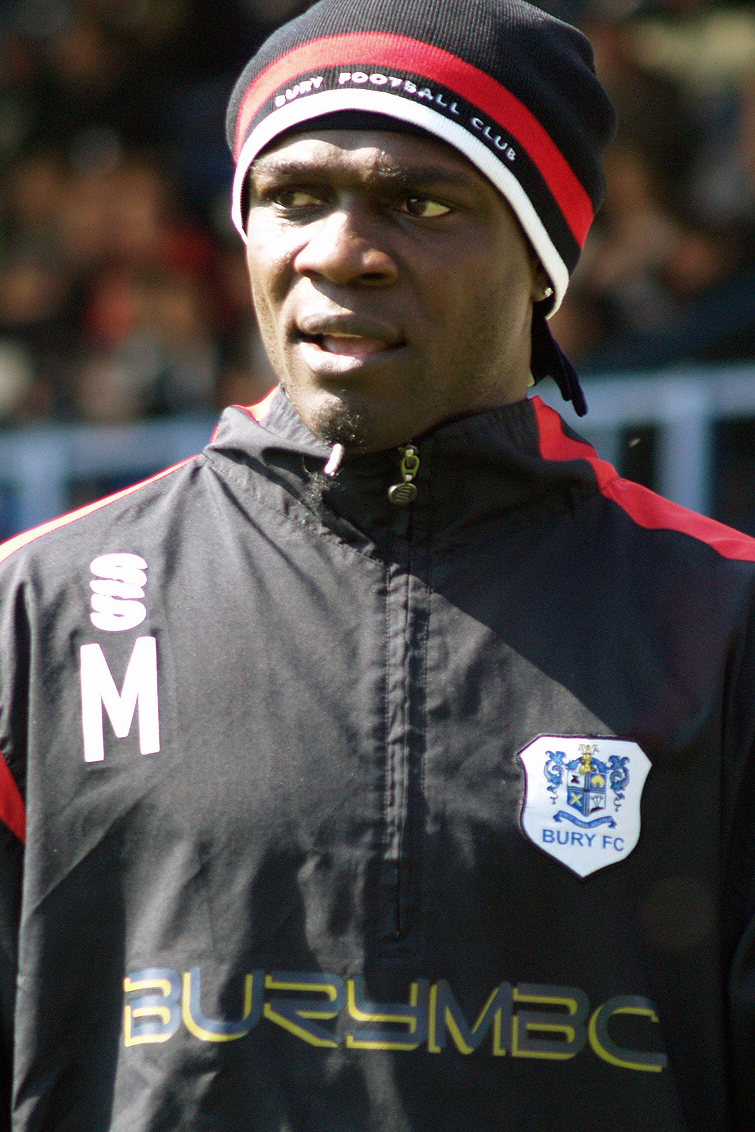
- Sodje with Bury in 2009

Personal information
- Full name: Efetobore Peter Sodje
- Date of birth: 5 October 1972 (age 54)
- Place of birth: Greenwich, London, England
- Height: 6 ft 1 in (1.85 m)
- Position: Centre-back

Senior career*
Years	Team	Apps	(Gls)
1994–1997	Stevenage Borough	116	(9)
1997–1999	Macclesfield Town	83	(6)
1999–2000	Luton Town	9	(0)
2000	→ Colchester United (loan)	3	(0)
2000–2003	Crewe Alexandra	97	(3)
2003–2005	Huddersfield Town	67	(5)
2005–2006	Yeovil Town	25	(3)
2006	→ Southend United (loan)	1	(0)
2006–2007	Southend United	36	(2)
2007–2008	Gillingham	13	(0)
2008	→ Bury (loan)	16	(1)
2008–2013	Bury	182	(15)
2013	→ Barrow (loan)	9	(0)
2013–2014	Macclesfield Town	6	(0)
Total		663	(44)

International career
2000–2004	Nigeria	12	(1)

Managerial career
- 2013–2015: Macclesfield Town (assistant)
- * Club domestic league appearances and goals

Efetobore Peter "Efe" Sodje (born 5 October 1972) is a former professional footballer who played as a centre-back. He played for several Football League clubs, and is famous for wearing a do-rag, with the headband often having the words "Against All Odds". Born in England, he represented Nigeria in the 2000 African Cup of Nations and the 2002 World Cup.

Sodje began his career at Stevenage Borough and later played for Luton Town, Colchester United, Crewe Alexandra, Huddersfield Town, Yeovil Town, Southend United, Gillingham, Bury, Barrow and Macclesfield Town in two spells.

== Club career ==
=== Early career ===
Sodje began his career playing for Stevenage Borough in the Conference National, who he had signed for ahead of the 1994–95 season. Prior to signing for Stevenage, Sodje had unsuccessful trials at both Wimbledon and Luton Town. He featured in Stevenage's reserve side throughout August 1994, waiting for his international clearance to come through before making a first-team appearance. He eventually made his debut on 27 September 1994, starting in Stevenage's 1–0 defeat at Welling United. Sodje made a total of 33 appearances during the 1994–95 campaign, scoring once in a 5–0 win over Yeovil Town, a game in which he came off the substitutes' bench to score. Sodje remained at Stevenage the following season, helping the club win the Conference National title, however they would be denied promotion to the Football League due to insufficient ground facilities. During the season, he made a total of 49 appearances, scoring five goals, four of which came in the league. Sodje's third season at Stevenage was his best in goalscoring terms; he scored 7 times in 55 games in all competitions as Stevenage finished the season in third place, beaten to the title by Macclesfield Town. Sodje left Stevenage at the end of the season to join newly promoted Football League side Macclesfield Town. He had made 138 appearances for Stevenage during his three-year spell with the side, scoring 13 goals.

Sodje scored on his Football League debut, which was also Macclesfield Town's first game in the League. He played 83 times and scored 6 goals for Macclesfield Town before he left to join Luton Town in 1999; there, he made only 9 appearances and was loaned out to Colchester United for part of the 1999–2000 season. Sodje made three appearances for Colchester before returning to Luton.

Sodje moved to Crewe Alexandra in 2000, where he made 97 league appearances over three seasons. His first goal for Crewe came in their 4–2 win over Portsmouth on 8 December 2001. During his time at Crewe Sodje was called up to the Nigeria squad for the first time in his career, and played at the 2002 FIFA World Cup in Japan.

=== Huddersfield Town ===
Sodje joined then Division 3 side Huddersfield Town, where he was made captain. His Town debut came in their 2–1 win over Derby County in the first round of the League Cup on 12 August 2003. His league debut came in their 2–2 draw with Boston United on 16 August. He scored his first goal for the Terriers came in their 2–0 home win over Boston United in January 2004. In his first season with the Terriers he helped them to the Division Three Play-off title.

Sodje was also voted into the PFA PFA Players' Division Three team of the season for the 2003–04 season

=== Southend United ===
Sodje left Southend following their relegation from the Championship in the 2006–07 season.

On 10 July 2007, he joined League One side Gillingham on a two-year deal, and made his debut in the 1–0 away defeat to Cheltenham Town on 11 August. In February 2008 he joined Bury on loan until the end of the season, and was transfer listed on 5 June 2008.

=== Bury ===
It was announced on 1 July 2008, that his contract had been terminated by Gillingham. Sodje was signed by Bury on a two-year contract as a player-coach, on 3 July 2008. At the beginning of the 2010–11 season, he was named 2nd vice-captain by Alan Knill after Ryan Lowe. In May 2011 he signed a new two-year contract extension.

He made his 500th league appearance in January 2012 playing for Bury in a 1–1 draw against Charlton Athletic.

=== Return to Macclesfield Town ===
In June 2013 Sodje returned to Macclesfield Town as assistant manager to John Askey; Sodje also registered himself as a player for the Silkmen. He left the club for undisclosed reasons in November 2015.

== International career ==
Although born in England, Sodje like his brother Sam represented Nigeria at international level. He was part of the squad that finished second to Cameroon in the 2000 African Cup of Nations.

He was also part of the Nigeria squad that went to the 2002 FIFA World Cup making two appearances against Argentina and England. Sodje played 12 times, scoring once in a 2–1 friendly win against Republic of Ireland in 2002.

== Personal life ==
Born in Greenwich, London, his family originate from Warri, in Delta State, Nigeria. Sodje is the eldest of four brothers who all play football; three of them professionally and one semi-professionally. Sam and Akpo (the youngest of the four) have both played alongside him; he played alongside Akpo at Huddersfield Town and he has represented Nigeria at international level with Sam. Steve, who plays semi-professionally has never played a Football League game. Another brother, Bright, used to play rugby league and rugby union. His nephew Onome Sodje has also played professionally in England.

Sodje started wearing a do-rag in 1994 at the request of his mother.

In September 2017, Sodje (along with his brothers Stephen and Bright) was sentenced to 18 months in prison for fraud, having siphoned off money from a charity, the Sodje Sports Foundation.

== Career statistics ==
=== Club ===
Appearances and goals by club, season and competition
Club	Season	League			FA Cup		League Cup		Other		Total	
Club	Season	Division	Apps	Goals	Apps	Goals	Apps	Goals	Apps	Goals	Apps	Goals
Macclesfield Town	1997–98	Third Division	41	3	2	0	2	0	1	0	46	3
Macclesfield Town	1998–99	Second Division	42	3	4	1	4	0	0	0	50	4
Macclesfield Town	Total		83	6	6	1	6	0	1	0	96	7
Luton Town	1999–2000	Second Division	9	0	3	0	1	0	1	0	14	0
Colchester United (loan)	1999–2000	Second Division	3	0	0	0	0	0	0	0	3	0
Crewe Alexandra	2000–01	First Division	31	0	2	0	3	0	0	0	36	0
Crewe Alexandra	2001–02	First Division	36	2	4	0	3	0	0	0	43	2
Crewe Alexandra	2002–03	Second Division	29	1	3	1	2	0	2	0	36	2
Crewe Alexandra	Total		96	3	9	1	8	0	2	0	115	4
Huddersfield Town	2003–04	Third Division	43	4	1	0	2	0	1	0	47	4
Huddersfield Town	2004–05	League One	28	1	0	0	1	0	1	0	30	1
Huddersfield Town	Total		71	5	1	0	3	0	2	0	77	5
Yeovil Town	2004–05	League Two	6	2	0	0	0	0	0	0	6	2
Yeovil Town	2005–06	League One	19	1	2	0	2	0	1	0	24	1
Yeovil Town	Total		25	3	2	0	2	0	1	0	30	3
Southend United (loan)	2005–06	League One	1	0	0	0	0	0	0	0	1	0
Southend United	2005–06	League One	12	1	0	0	0	0	0	0	12	1
Southend United	2006–07	Championship	24	1	0	0	4	0	0	0	28	1
Southend United	Total		36	2	0	0	4	0	0	0	40	2
Gillingham	2007–08	League One	13	0	1	0	1	0	1	0	16	0
Bury (loan)	2007–08	League Two	16	1	0	0	0	0	0	0	16	1
Bury	2008–09	League Two	43	7	1	0	1	0	0	0	45	7
Bury	2009–10	League Two	39	2	1	0	1	0	1	0	42	2
Bury	2010–11	League Two	40	3	2	1	1	0	0	0	43	4
Bury	2011–12	League One	41	2	0	0	2	0	0	0	43	2
Bury	2012–13	League One	19	1	2	1	1	0	1	0	23	2
Bury	Total		182	15	6	2	6	0	2	0	196	17
Barrow (loan)	2012–13	Conference Premier	9	0	0	0	0	0	0	0	9	0
Macclesfield Town	2013–14	Conference Premier	6	0	0	0	0	0	0	0	6	0
Career total			550	35	28	4	31	0	10	0	619	39

== Honours ==
Stevenage Borough

- Football Conference: 1995–96

Macclesfield Town

- Football League Division Three runner-up: 1997–98

Crewe Alexandra

- Football League Third Division runner-up: 2002–03

Huddersfield Town

- Football League Third Division play-offs: 2004

Southend United

- Football League One: 2005–06

Bury

- Football League Two runner-up: 2010–11

Individual

- PFA Team of the Year: 2003–04 Third Division
