= Domaine Rouse =

English footballer (born 1989)

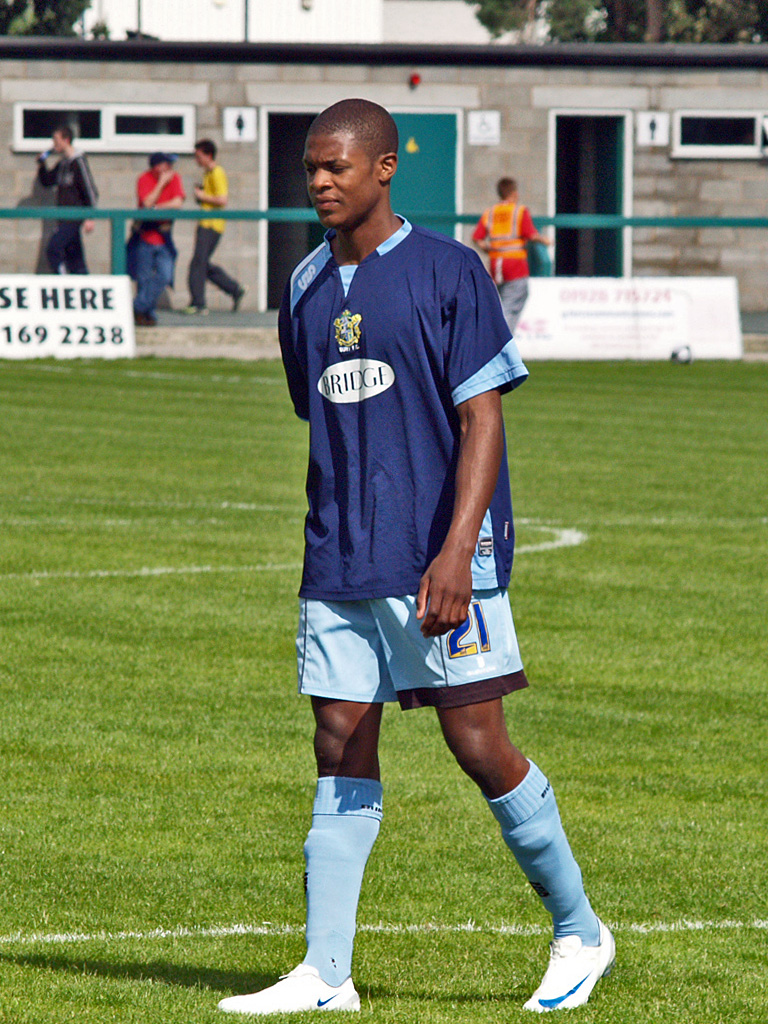

Personal information
- Full name: Domaine Leroy J. Rouse
- Date of birth: 4 July 1989 (age 37)
- Place of birth: Stretford, England
- Position: Striker

Team information
- Current team: Wythenshawe Town

Senior career*
Years	Team	Apps	(Gls)
2007–2009	Bury	12	(0)
2008	→ Droylsden (loan)	8	(3)
2009	→ Fleetwood (loan)	2	(0)
2010	Hyde	4	(0)
2010–2011	Droylsden	10	(0)
2011–2012	Colwyn Bay	8	(0)
2012–2014	Droylsden	9	(1)
2014–2015	Macclesfield Town	5	(1)
2015–2018	Droylsden		
2018–2022	Ramsbottom United		
2022–2023	Stalybridge Celtic	32	(2)
2023–2024	Clitheroe	45	(2)
2024–	Wythenshawe Town	23	(5)
- * Club domestic league appearances and goals as of 21:23, 21 December 2025 (UTC)

Domaine Leroy J. Rouse (born 4 July 1989) is an English footballer who plays as a striker for Wythenshawe Town. He has Football League experience with Bury. He was educated at Saint Ambrose College.

== Career ==
=== Bury ===
Born in Stretford, Greater Manchester, Rouse made his Bury debut as a 74th minute substitute for Marc Pugh in the 4–0 league defeat against Wycombe Wanderers at Gigg Lane, Bury in League Two.

On 9 October 2007 he scored his only goal for Bury in a 3–1 win over local rivals Rochdale at Spotland in the Football League Trophy. He played his final game for Bury against Hereford United on 18 August 2009. Then after the 1–0 win at Port Vale he was to be released by mutual consent. A brief statement from Alan Knill on their website read "I'm disappointed to see him leave because the kid's got talent, but you need more than talent to progress in the game", this was after he was late for training on numerous occasions and also having other disciplinary problems with the club.

=== Hyde ===
On 24 March 2010, Rouse joined up with Conference North outfit Hyde United. He made his Hyde debut on 27 March, coming on as a second half substitute in the 4–0 defeat to AFC Telford United. Then after a few good performances coming off the bench he earned his first start on 10 March in a 3–2 win over Redditch United. Then next month he made his final appearance for Hyde against Solihull Moors, which ended in a 1–1 draw, also the final game of the season.

In summer 2010, he left Hyde after just half a year and only four appearances for the club, to join their rivals Droylsden along with David McNiven.

=== Droylsden ===
He appeared in all three of Droylsden's FA Cup proper fixtures including the 8–2 battering to the hands of Leyton Orient in the second round replay on 7 December 2010. Then on 10 January 2011 he started for Droylsden against his former club Hyde, a game in which they won 3–1 to progress to the semi-final of the Manchester Premier Cup, Rouse had a controversial part to play in their second goal when he appeared to shove Steve Halford in the back before playing the ball across goal to Ciaran Kilheeney.

=== Colwyn Bay ===
He joined Colwyn Bay in September 2011 after being released by his former club. After returning to Droylsden between 2012 and 2014 he joined Macclesfield Town.

=== Later non-league career ===
In June 2023, Rouse signed for Clitheroe following a season with Stalybridge Celtic.

In November 2024, Rouse joined Wythenshawe Town.

== Career statistics ==
As of 10 January 2011.

Appearances and goals by club, season and competition
Club	Season	League		FA Cup		League Cup		Other		Total	
Club	Season	Apps	Goals	Apps	Goals	Apps	Goals	Apps	Goals	Apps	Goals
Bury	2006–07	2	0	0	0	0	0	0	0	2	0
Bury	2007–08	6	0	0	0	0	0	1	1	7	1
Bury	2008–09	0	0	0	0	0	0	0	0	0	0
Bury	2009–10	4	0	0	0	1	0	1	0	0	0
Bury	Total	12	0	0	0	1	0	2	1	15	1
Droylsden (loan)	2008–09	8	3	1	0	0	0	0	0	9	3
Fleetwood Town (loan)	2008–09	2	0	0	0	0	0	0	0	2	0
Hyde	2009–10	4	0	0	0	0	0	0	0	4	0
Droylsden	2010–11	10	0	3	0	0	0	3	0	16	0
Career totals		36	0	1	0	1	0	5	1	46	4
