= Ricky Anane =

English footballer

Personal information
- Full name: Richard Anane
- Date of birth: 18 February 1989 (age 37)
- Place of birth: Manchester, England
- Position: Right back

Youth career
- Bury

Senior career*
Years	Team	Apps	(Gls)
2007–2009	Bury	0	(0)
2009	→ Workington (loan)	2	(0)
2009	→ Fleetwood Town (loan)	1	(0)
2009–2011	Woking	75	(0)
2011–?	Droylsden	3	(0)
2012	Woodley Sports	?	(?)
2012–?	Stockport Sports	0	(0)
2015–?	Barnton		
- * Club domestic league appearances and goals as of 13:07, 11 August 2011 (UTC)

Richard Anane (born 18 February 1989) is an English footballer who plays as a defender.

== Career ==
Anane made his début for Bury away to Rochdale, in the 3–1 win in the Football League Trophy on 9 October 2007. He was loaned out to Fleetwood Town in April 2009.

He spent two years playing for Woking before moving on to play for Droylsden.

In 2012, he played for Woodley Sports before signing a full-time contract with the club after it changed its name to Stockport Sports for the 2012–13 season.

In June 2013, Ricky Anane was awarded the North West Counties 'Player of the Year' for 2012/13 season.

In December 2015 he signed for Barnton F.C. after a spell in Australia.
