= 2007–08 Morecambe F.C. season =

Morecambe
2007–08 season
- Chairman: Peter McGuigan
- Manager: Sammy McIlroy
- Stadium: Christie Park
- League Two: 11th
- FA Cup: First round
- League Cup: Third round
- League Trophy: Area Final
- Top goalscorer: League: Carl Baker (10); Matthew Blinkhorn (10); All: Carl Baker (11); Matthew Blinkhorn (11)
- Highest home attendance: 4,761 v Bradford City; 12 October 2007
- Lowest home attendance: 1,634 v Shrewsbury Town; 8 April 2008
- Average home league attendance: 2,812
- Biggest win: Morecambe 5–1 Rotherham United; 29 March 2008
- Biggest defeat: Sheffield United 5–0 Morecambe; 25 September 2007
- All statistics correct as of match played 3 May 2008.

The 2007–08 season was Morecambe's 84th season since formation, and their first ever in the Football League, having won promotion from the Conference the previous season. They played in League Two, the fourth tier of English football.

Their league campaign can roughly be broken down into three periods of mixed form, excellent form and poor form. After a mixed start, they went on a run of eight wins in 10 games, before recording just two wins in their final 14 games. An 11th placed finish in front of good crowds at Christie Park was a solid start to life in the Football League.

In the cup competitions, they excelled themselves. Although they were eliminated from the FA Cup in the First round, in the other two competitions they recorded their – as of 2021 – best ever performances.

In the League Cup they reached the Third round, being drawn away to Championship opposition on each occasion. They stunned Preston North End and Wolverhampton Wanderers (after extra time), before losing 5–0 to Sheffield United.

Meanwhile in the League Trophy, four victories saw them through to the Northern Area Final. A two legged affair against Grimsby Town stood between them and a second Wembley final in as many seasons. However after losing the first leg 1–0 at home, they were unable to turn the tie around at Blundell Park (0–0), and Grimsby progressed.

== Competitions ==
=== League Two ===
==== League table ====
| Pos | Team | Pld | W | D | L | GF | GA | GD | Pts |
|---|---|---|---|---|---|---|---|---|---|
| 9 | Rotherham United | 46 | 21 | 11 | 14 | 62 | 58 | +4 | 64 (Note: Rotherham United deducted 10 points for administration entrance.) |
| 10 | Bradford City | 46 | 17 | 11 | 18 | 63 | 61 | +2 | 62 |
| 11 | Morecambe | 46 | 16 | 12 | 18 | 59 | 63 | −4 | 60 |
| 12 | Barnet | 46 | 16 | 12 | 18 | 56 | 63 | −7 | 60 |
| 13 | Bury | 46 | 16 | 11 | 19 | 58 | 61 | −3 | 59 |

Updated to match(es) played on 3 May 2008. Source: The Football League
Rules for classification: 1) points; 2) goal difference; 3) number of goals scored.

==== Results summary ====
| Overall | | | | | | | | Home | | | | | | Away | | | | | |
| Pld | W | D | L | GF | GA | GD | Pts | W | D | L | GF | GA | GD | W | D | L | GF | GA | GD |
|---|---|---|---|---|---|---|---|---|---|---|---|---|---|---|---|---|---|---|---|
| 46 | 16 | 12 | 18 | 59 | 63 | −4 | 60 | 9 | 6 | 8 | 33 | 32 | +1 | 7 | 6 | 10 | 26 | 31 | −5 |

Last updated: 3 May 2008.
Source: 11v11.com

==== Results by matchday ====
| Matchday | 1 | 2 | 3 | 4 | 5 | 6 | 7 | 8 | 9 | 10 | 11 | 12 | 13 | 14 | 15 | 16 | 17 | 18 | 19 | 20 | 21 | 22 | 23 | 24 | 25 | 26 | 27 | 28 | 29 | 30 | 31 | 32 | 33 | 34 | 35 | 36 | 37 | 38 | 39 | 40 | 41 | 42 | 43 | 44 | 45 | 46 |
|---|---|---|---|---|---|---|---|---|---|---|---|---|---|---|---|---|---|---|---|---|---|---|---|---|---|---|---|---|---|---|---|---|---|---|---|---|---|---|---|---|---|---|---|---|---|---|
| Ground | H | A | H | A | A | H | A | H | H | A | H | A | H | A | H | A | H | A | A | A | H | H | A | A | H | H | A | H | H | A | H | A | A | H | A | A | H | H | A | H | A | H | H | A | H | A |
| Result | D | L | W | D | W | L | D | L | W | D | W | L | D | D | L | W | W | W | L | W | W | W | L | W | W | L | L | D | D | W | L | W | L | L | L | L | W | L | D | W | L | D | D | L | L | D |
| Position | 17 | 22 | 11 | 10 | 7 | 11 | 14 | 17 | 11 | 11 | 9 | 12 | 12 | 14 | 16 | 13 | 10 | 9 | 10 | 10 | 10 | 8 | 8 | 8 | 8 | 8 | 8 | 9 | 9 | 9 | 10 | 8 | 10 | 10 | 10 | 11 | 10 | 10 | 11 | 9 | 11 | 10 | 10 | 10 | 12 | 11 |

Updated to match(es) played on 3 May 2008. Source: 11v11.com
A = Away; H = Home; W = Win; D = Draw; L = Loss

==== Matches ====
| 11 August 2007 1 | Morecambe | 0–0 | Barnet | Morecambe |
| 15:00 BST | Adams (yellow card) 83' | Report | Thomas (yellow card) 13' | Stadium: Christie Park; Attendance: 3,633; Referee: Phil Joslin |

| 18 August 2007 2 | Wrexham | 2–1 | Morecambe | Wrexham |
| 15:00 BST | Proctor 6', 22', (yellow card) 90'; Llewellyn (yellow card) 68' | Report | Yates (yellow card) 15'; Newby 56' | Stadium: Racecourse Ground; Attendance: 5,504; Referee: Graham Horwood |

| 25 August 2007 3 | Morecambe | 3–1 | Mansfield Town | Morecambe |
| 15:00 BST | White 5' (o.g.); Twiss (yellow card) 43'; Stanley 44'; Baker 51' (pen.); Bentley (yellow card) 52' | Report | Boulding 40'; Jelleyman (yellow card) 50' | Stadium: Christie Park; Attendance: 2,980; Referee: Clive Oliver |

| 1 September 2007 4 | Notts County | 1–1 | Morecambe | Nottingham |
| 15:00 BST | Canoville (yellow card) 62'; Frost (yellow card) 75'; Butcher 87' | Report | Twiss 34'; Baker (yellow card) 45'; Adams (yellow card) 90' | Stadium: Meadow Lane; Attendance: 4,434; Referee: Steve Bratt |

| 7 September 2007 5 | Chester City | 0–1 | Morecambe | Chester |
| 19:45 BST | Linwood (red card) 90+2' | Report | Thompson (yellow card) 76'; Adams (yellow card) 84'; Baker 90+4' (pen.) | Stadium: Deva Stadium; Attendance: 3,199; Referee: Phil Dowd |

| 15 September 2007 6 | Morecambe | 0–3 | Hereford United | Morecambe |
| 15:00 BST | | Report | Broadhurst (yellow card) 13'; Benjamin 80'; Ainsworth 84'; Webb 90+4' | Stadium: Christie Park; Attendance: 2,949; Referee: Mark Haywood |

| 22 September 2007 7 | Peterborough United | 1–1 | Morecambe | Peterborough |
| 15:00 BST | McLean 63' (pen.); Charnock (yellow card) 79' | Report | Thompson 83', (yellow card) 90' | Stadium: London Road Stadium; Attendance: 4,473; Referee: Gavin Ward |

| 29 September 2007 8 | Morecambe | 0–1 | Milton Keynes Dons | Morecambe |
| 15:00 BST | | Report | Dyer 21'; Navarro (yellow card) 51'; Stirling (yellow card) 55' | Stadium: Christie Park; Attendance: 2,688; Referee: Michael Oliver |

| 2 October 2007 9 | Morecambe | 2–0 | Stockport County | Morecambe |
| 19:45 BST | Artell (yellow card) 1'; Baker 45+1', 66'; Twiss (yellow card) 85' | Report | McNeil (yellow card) 8' | Stadium: Christie Park; Attendance: 2,871; Referee: Paul Taylor |

| 6 October 2007 10 | Lincoln City | 1–1 | Morecambe | Lincoln |
| 15:00 BST | Amoo 22'; Green (yellow card) 90+2' | Report | Beevers 36' (o.g.) | Stadium: Sincil Bank; Attendance: 3,281; Referee: Steven Cook |

| 12 October 2007 11 | Morecambe | 2–1 | Bradford City | Morecambe |
| 19:45 BST | Thompson 64'; Artell (yellow card) 78'; Baker 90+1' | Report | Bower 43', (yellow card) 63' | Stadium: Christie Park; Attendance: 4,761; Referee: Colin Webster |

| 20 October 2007 12 | Rotherham United | 3–1 | Morecambe | Rotherham |
| 15:00 BST | Brogan 71' (pen.); Hudson (yellow card) 77'; Yates 81', 87' | Report | Adams (yellow card) 27'; Bentley 46', (yellow card) 78'; Artell (yellow card) 70'; Stanley (yellow card) 78' | Stadium: Millmoor; Attendance: 4,181; Referee: Darren Deadman |

| 27 October 2007 13 | Morecambe | 1–1 | Rochdale | Morecambe |
| 15:00 BST | Artell 17', (yellow card) 55'; Stanley (yellow card) 65'; Twiss (red card) 67'; Howard (yellow card) 90+2' | Report | McArdle 55', (yellow card) 87' | Stadium: Christie Park; Attendance: 3,651; Referee: Kevin Friend |

| 3 November 2007 14 | Chesterfield | 2–2 | Morecambe | Chesterfield |
| 15:00 GMT | Lester 56', 64' | Report | Curtis 1'; Drench (yellow card) 2'; Grand 90+4' | Stadium: Saltergate; Attendance: 3,721; Referee: Paul Melin |

| 6 November 2007 15 | Morecambe | 0–1 | Accrington Stanley | Morecambe |
| 19:45 GMT | Bentley (yellow card) 73' | Report | Cresswell 13' (o.g.) | Stadium: Christie Park; Attendance: 2,814; Referee: Mark Halsey |

| 17 November 2007 16 | Grimsby Town | 1–2 | Morecambe | Cleethorpes |
| 15:00 GMT | Taylor 53'; Boshell (red card) 77'; Bolland (yellow card) 88' | Report | Newby 28'; Twiss 50'; Bentley (yellow card) 69' | Stadium: Blundell Park; Attendance: 4,897; Referee: Pat Miller |

| 24 November 2007 17 | Morecambe | 2–1 | Bury | Morecambe |
| 15:00 GMT | Bentley 11'; Twiss 27' | Report | Bishop 76'; Woodthorpe (yellow card) 89' | Stadium: Christie Park; Attendance: 3,124; Referee: Rob Shoebridge |

| 4 December 2007 18 | Brentford | 0–1 | Morecambe | Brentford |
| 19:45 GMT | Dickson (yellow card) 26'; Mackie (yellow card) 31' | Report | Twiss 56'; Stanley (yellow card) 90' | Stadium: Griffin Park; Attendance: 3,155; Referee: Iain Williamson |

| 14 December 2007 19 | Wycombe Wanderers | 2–0 | Morecambe | High Wycombe |
| 19:30 GMT | McGleish 19'; McCracken (yellow card) 61'; Sutton 69' | Report | Stanley (yellow card) 20' | Stadium: Adams Park; Attendance: 3,821; Referee: Andy Penn |

| 22 December 2007 20 | Hereford United | 0–3 | Morecambe | Hereford |
| 15:00 GMT | Smith (yellow card) 25' | Report | Bentley 27'; Blinkhorn 38'; Hunter (yellow card) 57'; Artell 64' | Stadium: Edgar Street; Attendance: 3,058; Referee: Steve Bratt |

| 26 December 2007 21 | Morecambe | 5–3 | Chester City | Morecambe |
| 15:00 GMT | Bentley 18', 70'; Thompson 20'; Blinkhorn 25'; Stanley (yellow card) 44'; Baker 45+3' | Report | Ellison 5', 73'; Linwood (yellow card) 25'; Roberts (yellow card) 45+1'; Holroyd 76' | Stadium: Christie Park; Attendance: 3,419; Referee: Mike Pike |

| 29 December 2007 22 | Morecambe | 3–2 | Peterborough United | Morecambe |
| 15:00 GMT | Artell 27', (red card) 48'; Baker 52', 71' (pen.), (yellow card) 53' | Report | Morgan 5'; Lee 12'; Day (yellow card) 70' | Stadium: Christie Park; Attendance: 2,371; Referee: Carl Boyeson |

| 1 January 2008 23 | Stockport County | 2–1 | Morecambe | Stockport |
| 15:00 GMT | Elding 9', (yellow card) 13'; Dickinson 41' | Report | Yates (yellow card) 13'; Adams (yellow card) 43'; Stanley (yellow card) 59'; Baker (yellow card) 65'; Blinkhorn 80' | Stadium: Edgeley Park; Attendance: 5,489; Referee: Graham Salisbury |

| 5 January 2008 24 | Macclesfield Town | 1–2 | Morecambe | Macclesfield |
| 15:00 GMT | Gritton 25', (yellow card) 37'; Dunfield (yellow card) 64'; Dimech (yellow card) 66' | Report | Blinkhorn 30'; Howard (yellow card) 44'; Adams (yellow card) 74'; Thompson 86' | Stadium: Moss Rose; Attendance: 2,254; Referee: Jon Moss |

| 12 January 2008 25 | Morecambe | 1–0 | Dagenham & Redbridge | Morecambe |
| 15:00 GMT | Blinkhorn 90+2' | Report | | Stadium: Christie Park; Attendance: 2,754; Referee: Karl Evans |

| 15 January 2008 26 | Morecambe | 0–3 | Darlington | Morecambe |
| 19:45 GMT | Grand (yellow card) 74' | Report | Austin 27'; Wright (yellow card) 60'; Joachim 63'; Cummins (yellow card) 65'; Blundell 70' | Stadium: Christie Park; Attendance: 2,773; Referee: Darren Drysdale |

| 19 January 2008 27 | Shrewsbury Town | 2–0 | Morecambe | Shrewsbury |
| 15:00 GMT | Hall 4'; Madjo 31'; Pugh (yellow card) 57' | Report | Grand (yellow card) 36'; Stanley (yellow card) 57' | Stadium: New Meadow; Attendance: 5,036; Referee: Danny McDermid |

| 26 January 2008 28 | Morecambe | 1–1 | Notts County | Morecambe |
| 15:00 GMT | Baker 72'; Yates (yellow card) 84' | Report | Butcher 28'; Tann (yellow card) 67' | Stadium: Christie Park; Attendance: 2,727; Referee: Scott Mathieson |

| 29 January 2008 29 | Morecambe | 2–2 | Wrexham | Morecambe |
| 19:45 GMT | Curtis 8'; Roberts 52' (o.g.); Yates (yellow card) 67' | Report | Sonner 30' (pen.); Tremarco (yellow card) 35'; Hope (yellow card) 75' (yellow-red card) 90+6'; Proctor 79' (pen.) | Stadium: Christie Park; Attendance: 2,421; Referee: Andy Hall |

| 2 February 2008 30 | Barnet | 0–1 | Morecambe | Chipping Barnet |
| 15:00 GMT | Wright (yellow card) 88' | Report | Thompson 62'; Adams (yellow card) 88' | Stadium: Underhill Stadium; Attendance: 1,619; Referee: Andy D'Urso |

| 9 February 2008 31 | Morecambe | 0–1 | Macclesfield Town | Morecambe |
| 15:00 GMT | | Report | Reid (yellow card) 30'; Hessey (yellow card) 66'; Green 87'; Thomas (yellow card) 90+3' | Stadium: Christie Park; Attendance: 2,626; Referee: Andy Haines |

| 12 February 2008 32 | Mansfield Town | 1–2 | Morecambe | Mansfield |
| 19:45 GMT | Dawson (yellow card) 37'; Bell 48'; Mullins (yellow card) 51' | Report | Bentley 6'; Blinkhorn 24'; Curtis (yellow card) 89' | Stadium: Field Mill; Attendance: 2,287; Referee: Ray Lee |

| 23 February 2008 33 | Dagenham & Redbridge | 2–0 | Morecambe | Dagenham |
| 15:00 GMT | Gain 20'; Strevens 90+4' | Report | | Stadium: Victoria Road; Attendance: 1,809; Referee: Clive Penton |

| 1 March 2008 34 | Morecambe | 0–4 | Grimsby Town | Morecambe |
| 15:00 GMT | | Report | Bore 22', 25'; Hegarty 59'; Butler 81' | Stadium: Christie Park; Attendance: 2,303; Referee: Colin Webster |

| 8 March 2008 35 | Bury | 2–1 | Morecambe | Bury |
| 15:00 GMT | Bishop 45+1', 49' (pen.) | Report | Drummond 53', (yellow card) 62'; Lloyd (yellow card) 69' | Stadium: Gigg Lane; Attendance: 2,596; Referee: Anthony Bates |

| 12 March 2008 36 | Accrington Stanley | 3–2 | Morecambe | Accrington |
| 19:45 GMT | Kempson 43'; Mangan 72'; Mullin 73'; Whalley (yellow card) 78' | Report | Blinkhorn 14'; Twiss 50'; Drummond (yellow card) 62' | Stadium: Fraser Eagle Stadium; Attendance: 1,448; Referee: Alan Wiley |

| 15 March 2008 37 | Morecambe | 3–1 | Brentford | Morecambe |
| 15:00 GMT | Drummond 31'; Adams (yellow card) 35'; Thompson 53'; Hunter 88' | Report | Elder 42'; Dickson (yellow card) 72'; Connell (yellow card) 76' | Stadium: Christie Park; Attendance: 2,180; Referee: Richard Beeby |

| 22 March 2008 38 | Morecambe | 0–1 | Wycombe Wanderers | Morecambe |
| 15:00 GMT | Adams (yellow card) 55' | Report | Oakes 36' | Stadium: Christie Park; Attendance: 2,524; Referee: Rob Lewis |

| 24 March 2008 39 | Darlington | 2–2 | Morecambe | Darlington |
| 15:00 GMT | Foran (yellow card) 57'; Kennedy 84'; Ndumbu-Nsungu 89' | Report | Thompson 38' (pen.); Newby 41' | Stadium: The Darlington Arena; Attendance: 3,719; Referee: Michael Oliver |

| 29 March 2008 40 | Morecambe | 5–1 | Rotherham United | Morecambe |
| 15:00 GMT | Blinkhorn 8'; Newby 9', 18', 42'; Stanley 73' | Report | Hudson 35'; Holmes (yellow card) 38' | Stadium: Christie Park; Attendance: 2,171; Referee: Eddie Ilderton |

| 5 April 2008 41 | Bradford City | 1–0 | Morecambe | Bradford |
| 15:00 BST | Penford (yellow card) 40'; Conlon (yellow card) 48'; Johnson 56' | Report | Newby (yellow card) 61'; Curtis (yellow card) 74'; Blinkhorn (yellow card) 87' | Stadium: Coral Windows Stadium; Attendance: 13,562; Referee: David Coote |

| 8 April 2008 42 | Morecambe | 1–1 | Shrewsbury Town | Morecambe |
| 19:45 BST | Baker 32'; Blinkhorn (yellow card) 73'; Stanley (yellow card) 74' | Report | Pugh 70', (yellow card) 70'; Herd (yellow card) 73' | Stadium: Christie Park; Attendance: 1,634; Referee: Mike Jones |

| 12 April 2008 43 | Morecambe | 1–1 | Chesterfield | Morecambe |
| 15:00 BST | Blinkhorn 74' | Report | Fletcher 35' | Stadium: Christie Park; Attendance: 2,531; Referee: Stuart Attwell |

| 19 April 2008 44 | Rochdale | 1–0 | Morecambe | Rochdale |
| 15:00 BST | Holness (yellow card) 17'; Howe 66' | Report | Yates (yellow card) 77'; McStay (yellow card) 89' | Stadium: Spotland Stadium; Attendance: 3,706; Referee: Jon Moss |

| 26 April 2008 45 | Morecambe | 1–2 | Lincoln City | Morecambe |
| 15:00 BST | McStay (yellow card) 54'; Blinkhorn 90+3' | Report | Moses (yellow card) 20'; Beevers (yellow card) 40'; Wright 42'; Green 70' | Stadium: Christie Park; Attendance: 2,762; Referee: Steven Cook |

| 3 May 2008 46 | Milton Keynes Dons | 1–1 | Morecambe | Milton Keynes |
| 15:00 BST | Howell (yellow card) 29'; Lewington (yellow card) 34'; Wilbraham 41'; O'Hanlon (yellow card) 57' | Report | Adams (yellow card) 68'; Twiss 78' | Stadium: Stadium MK; Attendance: 17,250; Referee: Paul Armstrong |

=== FA Cup ===
| 10 November 2007 First round | Morecambe | 0–2 | Port Vale | Morecambe |
| 15:00 GMT | | Report | Pilkington 6'; Willock 22'; Laird (yellow card) 54' | Stadium: Christie Park; Attendance: 2,730; Referee: Clive Oliver |

=== League Cup ===
| 14 August 2007 First round | Preston North End | 1–2 | Morecambe | Preston |
| 19:45 BST | St Ledger (yellow card) 61'; Pugh 73'; Sedgwick (yellow card) 79'; Carroll (yellow card) 90' | Report | Bentley 6'; Artell 84' | Stadium: Deepdale; Attendance: 7,703; Referee: Alan Wiley |

| 28 August 2007 Second round | Wolverhampton Wanderers | 1–3 (a.e.t.) | Morecambe | Wolverhampton |
| 19:45 BST | Edwards (yellow card) 43'; Stack (yellow card) 61'; Keogh 84' (pen.) | Report | Baker (yellow card) 54' (goal) 62' (pen.); Newby 92'; Lewis (yellow card) 101'; Adams (yellow card) 103'; Thompson 105' | Stadium: Molineux; Attendance: 11,296; Referee: Anthony Taylor |

| 25 September 2007 Third round | Sheffield United | 5–0 | Morecambe | Sheffield |
| 19:45 BST | Sharp 18', 33'; Shelton 52', 72'; Hendrie 67' | Report | Bentley (yellow card) 55' | Stadium: Bramall Lane; Attendance: 8,854; Referee: Steve Tanner |

== First-team squad ==
Squad at end of season

Note: Flags indicate national team as defined under FIFA eligibility rules; some limited exceptions apply. Players may hold more than one non-FIFA nationality.

| No. | Pos. | Nation | Player |
|---|---|---|---|
| 1 | GK | ENG | Steven Drench |
| 2 | DF | ENG | Adam Yates |
| 3 | DF | ENG | Michael Howard |
| 4 | DF | ENG | David Artell (Note: Artell was born in Rotherham, England, but also qualified to represent Gibraltar internationally and made his international debut for Gibraltar in March 2014.) |
| 5 | DF | ENG | Jim Bentley |
| 6 | MF | ENG | Craig Stanley |
| 7 | MF | ENG | Michael Twiss |
| 8 | MF | ENG | Garry Hunter |
| 9 | FW | ENG | Wayne Curtis |
| 10 | MF | ENG | Carl Baker |
| 11 | MF | ENG | Garry Thompson |
| 12 | MF | ENG | Damien Allen |
| 14 | MF | ENG | Neil Sorvel |
| 15 | MF | ENG | Fraser McLachlan |
| 16 | MF | ENG | Stewart Drummond |

| No. | Pos. | Nation | Player |
|---|---|---|---|
| 17 | MF | ENG | Jamie Burns |
| 18 | MF | ENG | Paul Lloyd |
| 19 | DF | ENG | Simon Grand |
| 20 | FW | ENG | Jon Newby |
| 21 | FW | ENG | Matthew Blinkhorn |
| 22 | DF | ENG | Jamie Davies |
| 23 | DF | IRL | Henry McStay (Note: McStay was born in Armagh, Northern Ireland, but also qualified to represent the Republic of Ireland internationally and has represented them at U-21 level.) |
| 24 | DF | ENG | Andy Langford |
| 25 | DF | ENG | Danny Adams |
| 26 | MF | ENG | Paul Jarvis |
| 28 | MF | ENG | Gary Ball |
| 30 | GK | ENG | Scott Davies |
| 32 | GK | ENG | Shwan Jalal (Note: Jalal was born in Baghdad, Iraq, but was raised in England and played for the England C team; he later made his international debut for Iraq in June 2015.) (on loan from Peterborough United) |
| 33 | GK | SCO | Steve McIlhargey |

=== Left club during season ===
Note: Flags indicate national team as defined under FIFA eligibility rules; some limited exceptions apply. Players may hold more than one non-FIFA nationality.

| No. | Pos. | Nation | Player |
|---|---|---|---|
| 23 | DF | ENG | Keiran Walmsley (to Fleetwood Town) |
| 27 | DF | ENG | Phil McLuckie (to Workington) |
| 29 | DF | ENG | Ryan Cresswell (on loan from Sheffield United) |

| No. | Pos. | Nation | Player |
|---|---|---|---|
| 31 | GK | ENG | Scott Loach (on loan from Watford) |
| 32 | GK | ENG | Joe Lewis (on loan from Norwich City) |
