= 2008–09 Morecambe F.C. season =

Morecambe
2008–09 season
- Chairman: Peter McGuigan
- Manager: Sammy McIlroy
- Stadium: Christie Park
- League Two: 11th
- FA Cup: Second round
- Football League Cup: First round
- Johnstones Paint Trophy: Northern Quarter Final

This page shows the progress of Morecambe F.C. in the 2008–09 football season. During the season, Morecambe competed in League Two in the English league system. This would be Morecambe's second season in the Football League

== League table ==
Pos	Team	Pld	W	D	L	GF	GA	GD	Pts
9	Bradford City	46	18	13	15	66	55	+11	67
10	Chesterfield	46	16	15	15	62	57	+5	63
11	Morecambe	46	15	18	13	53	56	−3	63
12	Darlington	46	20	12	14	61	44	+17	62 (Note: Darlington deducted 10 points for entering administration.)
13	Lincoln City	46	14	17	15	53	52	+1	59

Source: The Football League
Rules for classification: 1) points; 2) goal difference; 3) number of goals scored.

== Results ==
=== Football League Two ===
9 August 2008 1	Wycombe Wanderers	1–1	Morecambe	High Wycombe
	Spence 34'		Artell 66'	Stadium: Adams Park; Attendance: 4,021

16 August 2008 2	Morecambe	1–3	Rotherham United	Morecambe
	Wainwright 77'		Lynch 8', 90'; Taylor 40'	Stadium: Christie Park; Attendance: 2,606

23 August 2008 3	Bury	2–1	Morecambe	Bury
	Scott 19'; Artell 30' (o.g.)		Howe 14'	Stadium: Gigg Lane; Attendance: 2,679

30 August 2008 4	Morecambe	1–2	Dagenham & Redbridge	Morecambe
	O'Carroll 79'		Saunders 50'; Taiwo 53'	Stadium: Christie Park; Attendance: 1,571

6 September 2008 5	Morecambe	1–0	Shrewsbury Town	Morecambe
	Howe 4'			Stadium: Christie Park; Attendance: 2,318

13 September 2008 6	Barnet	1–1	Morecambe	London
	Adomah 18'		O'Carroll 42'	Stadium: Underhill; Attendance: 1,776

20 September 2008 7	Morecambe	1–1	Grimsby Town	Morecambe
	Curtis 75'		Till 10' (pen.)	Stadium: Christie Park; Attendance: 1,989

27 September 2008 8	Lincoln City	1–1	Morecambe	Lincoln
	Frecklington 20'		Stanley 45'	Stadium: Sincil Bank; Attendance: 5,003

4 October 2008 9	Morecambe	2–2	Chesterfield	Morecambe
	Drummond 6'; Howe 85'		Robertson 16'; Ward 21' (pen.)	Stadium: Christie Park; Attendance: 1,734

11 October 2008 10	Gillingham	5–0	Morecambe	Gillingham
	Bentley 21'; Jackson 24', 36'; Artell 73' (o.g.); McCammon 80'			Stadium: Priestfield; Attendance: 4,316

18 October 2008 11	Morecambe	1–1	Rochdale	Morecambe
	Taylor 48'		Dagnall 19'	Stadium: Christie Park; Attendance: 2,572

21 October 2008 12	Brentford	3–1	Morecambe	London
	MacDonald 8'; Poole 11'; Elder 36'		Drummond 5'	Stadium: Griffin Park; Attendance: 3,733

25 October 2008 13	Port Vale	2–1	Morecambe	Stoke on Trent
	Rodgers 80'; Richards 90'		Bentley 81'	Stadium: Vale Park; Attendance: 5,629

28 October 2008 14	Morecambe	1–1	Accrington Stanley	Morecambe
	Stanley 50'		McStay 4' (o.g.)	Stadium: Christie Park; Attendance: 2,044

1 November 2008 15	Morecambe	2–0	Aldershot Town	Morecambe
	Drummond 56'; McGivern 69'			Stadium: Christie Park; Attendance: 1,897

15 November 2008 16	Chester City	1–2	Morecambe	Chester
	Johnson 60'; Ellison (red card) 82'		Stanley 32'; Howe 56' (pen.); Adams (red card) 83'	Stadium: Deva Stadium; Attendance: 1,647

22 November 2008 17	Morecambe	1–1	Exeter City	Morecambe
	Howe 22'		Panther 85'	Stadium: Christie Park; Attendance: 2,003

25 November 2008 18	Bournemouth	0–0	Morecambe	Bournemouth
				Stadium: Fitness First Stadium; Attendance: 3,068

6 December 2008 19	Notts County	1–0	Morecambe	Nottingham
	Canham 45'			Stadium: Meadow Lane; Attendance: 3,671

13 December 2008 20	Morecambe	1–0	Darlington	Morecambe
	Howe 67'			Stadium: Christie Park; Attendance: 1,873

20 December 2008 21	Luton Town	1–1	Morecambe	Luton
	Spillane 51'		Carlton 57'	Stadium: Kenilworth Road; Attendance: 5,664

26 December 2008 22	Morecambe	4–1	Macclesfield Town	Morecambe
	McStay 17'; Carlton 24'; Drummond 63'; Howe 79'		Reid 3'	Stadium: Christie Park; Attendance: 2,578

28 December 2008 23	Bradford City	4–0	Morecambe	Bradford
	McLaren 24'; Boulding 62'; Law 77'; Conlon 87' (pen.)			Stadium: Coral Windows Stadium; Attendance: 13,105

17 January 2009 24	Morecambe	0–1	Gillingham	Morecambe
			Weston 19'	Stadium: Christie Park; Attendance: 2,027

24 January 2009 25	Chesterfield	1–2	Morecambe	Chesterfield
	Gritton 57'		Howe 54'; Stanley 65'	Stadium: Saltergate; Attendance: 3,283

27 January 2009 26	Accrington Stanley	1–0	Morecambe	Accrington
	Ryan 57'			Stadium: Crown Ground; Attendance: 1,407

31 January 2009 27	Morecambe	1–1	Port Vale	Morecambe
	Stanley 4'		Richman 43'	Stadium: Christie Park; Attendance: 1,823

3 February 2009 28	Morecambe	2–0	Brentford	Morecambe
	Twiss 23'; Howe 89'			Stadium: Christie Park; Attendance: 1,253

10 February 2009 29	Morecambe	1–1	Lincoln City	Morecambe
	Bentley 19'		Green 83'	Stadium: Christie Park; Attendance: 1,471

14 February 2009 30	Morecambe	3–1	Chester City	Morecambe
	Taylor 15'; Curtis 32', 44'		Wilson 51'	Stadium: Christie Park; Attendance: 1,795

17 February 2009 31	Rochdale	1–1	Morecambe	Rochdale
	Buckley 50'		Twiss 90'	Stadium: Spotland; Attendance: 3,347

21 February 2009 32	Aldershot Town	0–2	Morecambe	Aldershot
			Curtis 45'; Drummond 54'	Stadium: EBB Stadium; Attendance: 2,872

24 February 2009 33	Grimsby Town	2–3	Morecambe	Grimsby
	Forbes 21', 57'; Llewellyn (red card) 41'		Twiss 63'; O'Carroll 81'; Hunter 90'	Stadium: Blundell Park; Attendance: 2,644

28 February 2009 34	Morecambe	0–0	Wycombe Wanderers	Morecambe
				Stadium: Christie Park; Attendance: 2,005

4 March 2009 35	Dagenham & Redbridge	0–2	Morecambe	London
			O'Carroll 13'; Drummond 15'	Stadium: Victoria Road; Attendance: 1,403

10 March 2009 36	Morecambe	0–0	Bury	Morecambe
				Stadium: Christie Park; Attendance: 2,165

14 March 2009 37	Morecambe	2–1	Barnet	Morecambe
	Artell 33'; Curtis 38'		O'Flynn 34'	Stadium: Christie Park; Attendance: 1,899

21 March 2009 38	Shrewsbury Town	0–0	Morecambe	Shrewsbury
				Stadium: Prostar Stadium; Attendance: 5,426

28 March 2009 39	Morecambe	1–2	Luton Town	Morecambe
	Drummond 21'		Martin 43'; Gallen 59'	Stadium: Christie Park; Attendance: 2,599

4 April 2009 40	Darlington	0–0	Morecambe	Darlington
				Stadium: The Darlington Arena; Attendance: 2,560

10 April 2009 41	Morecambe	2–1	Bradford City	Morecambe
	Drummond 56'; Howe 75'		Clarke 37'	Stadium: Christie Park; Attendance: 4,546

13 April 2009 42	Macclesfield Town	0–1	Morecambe	Macclesfield
			Artell 85'	Stadium: Moss Rose; Attendance: 1,773

18 April 2009 43	Morecambe	1–0	Notts County	Morecambe
	Duffy 72'			Stadium: Christie Park; Attendance: 2,161

21 April 2009 44	Rotherham United	3–2	Morecambe	Rotherham
	R.Taylor 45'; J.Taylor 80'; Burchill 89' (pen.)		O'Carroll 52'; Bentley 90'	Stadium: Don Valley Stadium; Attendance: 2,078

25 April 2009 45	Exeter City	2–2	Morecambe	Exeter
	Moxey 49'; Harley 53'		Drummond 9', 79'	Stadium: St James Park; Attendance: 8,544

2 May 2009 46	Morecambe	0–4	Bournemouth	Morecambe
			Ward 7'; Feeney 36'; Pitman 43', 69'	Stadium: Christie Park; Attendance: 2,601

=== FA Cup ===
8 November 2008 Round 1	Morecambe	2–1	Grimsby Town	Morecambe
	Taylor 45', 77'		Stockdale 88'	Stadium: Christie Park; Attendance: 1,713

2 December 2008 Round 2	Morecambe	2–3	Cheltenham Town	Morecambe
	McStay 5'; Howe 27' (pen.)		Vincent 23', 54'; Finnigan 36' (pen.)	Stadium: Christie Park; Attendance: 1,758

=== League Cup ===
13 August 2008 Round 1	Nottingham Forest	4–0	Morecambe	Nottingham
	Cohen 14'; Earnshaw 62', 89'; Newbold 81'			Stadium: City Ground; Attendance: 4,030

=== Football League Trophy ===
2 September 2008 Round 1 Northern Section	Oldham Athletic	1–1 (4–5 p)	Morecambe	Oldham
	Whitaker 56'		Drummond 65'	Stadium: Boundary Park; Attendance: 2,016

7 October 2008 Round 2 Northern Section	Chester City	1–1 (1–3 p)	Morecambe	Chester
	Ellison 82'		Howe 42'	Stadium: Deva Stadium; Attendance: 926

4 November 2008 Quarter Final Northern Section	Tranmere Rovers	1–0	Morecambe	Birkenhead
	Shotton 45'			Stadium: Prenton Park; Attendance: 2,110

== Players ==
=== First-team squad ===
Includes all players who were awarded squad numbers during the season.

Note: Flags indicate national team as defined under FIFA eligibility rules; some limited exceptions apply. Players may hold more than one non-FIFA nationality.

No.	Pos.	Nation	Player
1	GK	(Republic of Ireland) IRL	Barry Roche
2	DF	(England) ENG	Adam Yates
3	DF	(England) ENG	Michael Howard
4	DF	(England) ENG	David Artell
5	DF	(England) ENG	Jim Bentley
6	MF	(England) ENG	Craig Stanley
7	FW	(England) ENG	Michael Twiss
8	MF	(England) ENG	Garry Hunter
9	FW	(England) ENG	Wayne Curtis
10	FW	(England) ENG	Rene Howe (on loan from Peterborough United)
11	MF	(England) ENG	Neil Wainwright
12	GK	(England) ENG	Lewis Edge

No.	Pos.	Nation	Player
14	FW	(Republic of Ireland) IRL	Diarmuid O'Carroll
15	MF	(England) ENG	Fraser McLachlan
16	MF	(England) ENG	Stewart Drummond
17	FW	(England) ENG	Aaron Taylor
18	MF	(England) ENG	Mark Duffy (on loan from Southport)
21	FW	(England) ENG	Matthew Blinkhorn
22	DF	(England) ENG	Andy Parrish
23	DF	(Northern Ireland) NIR	Henry McStay
24	DF	(England) ENG	Matty Bell
25	DF	(England) ENG	Danny Adams
30	GK	(England) ENG	Scott Davies

=== Left club during season ===
Note: Flags indicate national team as defined under FIFA eligibility rules; some limited exceptions apply. Players may hold more than one non-FIFA nationality.

No.	Pos.	Nation	Player
12	MF	(England) ENG	Dan Smith (returned to parent club Plymouth Argyle following loan spell)
26	DF	(Northern Ireland) NIR	Ryan McGivern (returned to parent club Manchester City following loan spell)
27	FW	(England) ENG	Danny Carlton (returned to parent club Carlisle United following loan spell)

No.	Pos.	Nation	Player
19	MF	(Scotland) SCO	Ryan McCann (signed for Queen of the South in January 2009)
20	MF	(England) ENG	Michael Carr
18	MF	(England) ENG	Paul Lloyd
