= 2009–10 Morecambe F.C. season =

Morecambe
2009–10 season
- Chairman: Peter McGuigan
- Manager: Sammy McIlroy
- Stadium: Christie Park
- League Two: 4th
- FA Cup: First round
- Football League Cup: First round
- Johnstones Paint Trophy: First round

This page shows the progress of Morecambe F.C. in the 2009–10 football season. During the season, Morecambe competed in League Two in the English league system. This would be Morecambe's third season in the Football League and their last playing at home at Christie Park

== League table ==
Pos	Team	Pld	W	D	L	GF	GA	GD	Pts	Promotion, qualification or relegation
2	Bournemouth (P)	46	25	8	13	61	44	+17	83	Promotion to Football League One
3	Rochdale (P)	46	25	7	14	82	48	+34	82	Promotion to Football League One
4	Morecambe	46	20	13	13	73	64	+9	73	Qualification to League Two play-offs
5	Rotherham United	46	21	10	15	55	52	+3	73	Qualification to League Two play-offs
6	Aldershot Town	46	20	12	14	69	56	+13	72	Qualification to League Two play-offs

Updated to match(es) played on unknown. Source: football-league.co.uk
(P) Promoted

== Results ==
=== Football League Two ===
8 August 2009 1	Morecambe	2–2	Hereford United	Morecambe
	Stanley 43'; Drummond 57'		Pugh 39', 90'	Stadium: Christie Park

15 August 2009 2	Burton Albion	5–2	Morecambe	Burton on Trent
	Pearson 3', 54' (pen.); Penn 16'; Harrad 38'; McGrath 75'		Craney 17'; Jevons 62'; Duffy (red card) 87'	Stadium: Pirelli Stadium

18 August 2009 3	Barnet	2–0	Morecambe	London
	Furlong 3'; Jarrett 83' (pen.)			Stadium: Underhill

22 August 2009 4	Morecambe	2–2	Macclesfield Town	Morecambe
	Twiss 49'; Artell 81'		Tipton 12' (pen.); Draper 58'	Stadium: Christie Park

29 August 2009 5	Chesterfield	1–1	Morecambe	Chesterfield
	Lester 75'		Jevons 79' (pen.)	Stadium: Saltergate

4 September 2009 6	Morecambe	3–3	Rochdale	Morecambe
	Jevons 33', 42'; Craney 38'		Dagnall 48'; Thompson 64'; Stephens 76'	Stadium: Christie Park

12 September 2009 7	Rotherham United	0–0	Morecambe	Sheffield
				Stadium: Don Valley Stadium

19 September 2009 8	Morecambe	2–1	Notts County	Morecambe
	Bentley 36'; Mullin 52'		Davies 71'	Stadium: Christie Park

26 September 2009 9	Dagenham & Redbridge	1–1	Morecambe	London
	Scott 37'		Jevons 62' (pen.)	Stadium: Victoria Road

29 September 2009 10	Morecambe	0–0	Bradford City	Morecambe
			Evans (red card) 77'	Stadium: Christie Park

3 October 2009 11	Morecambe	1–1	Shrewsbury Town	Morecambe
	Drummond 23'; Adams (red card) 65'		Labadie 8'; Labadie (red card) 68'	Stadium: Christie Park

10 October 2009 12	Aldershot Town	4–1	Morecambe	Aldershot
	Morgan 14'; Stanley 47' (o.g.); Hudson 67'; Soares 80'		Mullin 90'	Stadium: Recreation Ground

17 October 2009 13	Torquay United	2–2	Morecambe	Torquay
	Wroe 19' (pen.); Carlisle 54'		Duffy 24'; Mullin 47'	Stadium: Plainmoor

24 October 2009 14	Morecambe	2–4	Northampton Town	Morecambe
	Jevons 26' (pen.); Drummond 40'		Guinan 4'; Holt 70'; Johnson 79'; Akinfenwa 84'	Stadium: Christie Park

31 October 2009 15	Morecambe	3–1	Lincoln City	Morecambe
	Drummond 19'; Jevons 42' (pen.); Mullin 54'		Howe 79'; Lichaj (red card) 82'	Stadium: Christie Park

14 November 2009 16	Crewe Alexandra	1–2	Morecambe	Crewe
	Schumacher 77'		Bentley 7'; Jevons 37'	Stadium: Gresty Road

21 November 2009 17	Morecambe	1–0	Cheltenham Town	Morecambe
	Wilson 24'			Stadium: Christie Park

24 November 2009 18	Darlington	0–4	Morecambe	Darlington
			Jevons 56'; Wilson 64'; Drummond 80'; Curtis 85'	Stadium: The Darlington Arena

1 December 2009 19	Morecambe	3–0	Bury	Morecambe
	Jevons 60' (pen.); Futcher 68' (o.g.)			Stadium: Christie Park

5 December 2009 20	Port Vale	0–2	Morecambe	Stoke on Trent
			Jevons 1'; Mullin 39'	Stadium: Vale Park

12 December 2009 21	Morecambe	5–0	Bournemouth	Morecambe
	Drummond 15'; Stanley 23'; Wilson 25'; Jevons 50' (pen.); Duffy 90'		Bartley (red card) 42'	Stadium: Christie Park

18 December 2009 22	Grimsby Town	1–1	Morecambe	Grimsby
	Sweeney 67'		Mullin 60'	Stadium: Blundell Park

26 December 2009 23	Morecambe	1–2	Accrington Stanley	Morecambe
	Hunter 69'		Edwards 56', 62' (pen.)	Stadium: Christie Park

28 December 2009 24	Rochdale	4–1	Morecambe	Rochdale
	O'Grady 12'; Dagnall 22'; Atkinson 72', 86'		Curtis 84'	Stadium: Spotland

23 January 2010 25	Morecambe	2–1	Barnet	Morecambe
	Drummond 4'; Duffy 78'		Lockwood 34' (pen.)	Stadium: Christie Park

26 January 2010 26	Macclesfield Town	2–2	Morecambe	Macclesfield
	Lindfield 38'; Sappleton 83'		Drummond 52'; Haining 64'	Stadium: Moss Rose

30 January 2010 27	Morecambe	0–1	Chesterfield	Morecambe
			Gritton 18'; Artus (red card) 42'	Stadium: Christie Park

6 February 2010 28	Accrington Stanley	3–2	Morecambe	Accrington
	Grant 29', 62'; Ryan 83'		Artell 17', 54'	Stadium: Crown Ground

13 February 2010 29	Morecambe	2–0	Darlington	Morecambe
	Jevons 9'; Mullin 58'			Stadium: Christie Park

16 February 2010 30	Morecambe	3–2	Burton Albion	Morecambe
	Drummond 28'; Jevons 72'; Mullin 85'		Maghoma 23'; Harrad 41'	Stadium: Christie Park

20 February 2010 31	Cheltenham Town	2–0	Morecambe	Cheltenham
	Alsop 33'; Thornhill 59'			Stadium: Whaddon Road

23 February 2010 32	Bury	0–0	Morecambe	Bury
				Stadium: Gigg Lane

27 February 2010 33	Morecambe	1–0	Port Vale	Morecambe
	Jevons 20'			Stadium: Christie Park

6 March 2010 34	Bournemouth	1–0	Morecambe	Bournemouth
	Robinson 18'			Stadium: Dean Court

13 March 2010 35	Morecambe	1–1	Grimsby Town	Morecambe
	Mullin 41'		Coulson 59'	Stadium: Christie Park

16 March 2010 36	Hereford United	0–1	Morecambe	Hereford
			Bentley 24'	Stadium: Edgar Street

20 March 2010 37	Northampton Town	2–0	Morecambe	Northampton
	Davis 2'; Gilligan 51'			Stadium: Sixfields

27 March 2010 38	Morecambe	2–0	Torquay United	Morecambe
	Mullin 8'; Stanley 90'			Stadium: Christie Park

2 April 2010 39	Morecambe	4–3	Crewe Alexandra	Morecambe
	Jevons 53'; Parrish (red card) 71'; Curtis 87'; Mullin 90'; Artell 90'		Grant 17'; Miller 30'; Donaldson 63'	Stadium: Christie Park

5 April 2010 40	Lincoln City	1–3	Morecambe	Lincoln
	Hughton 66'		Stanley 17'; Mullin 82'; Curtis 90'	Stadium: Sincil Bank

10 April 2010 41	Morecambe	2–0	Rotherham United	Morecambe
	Jevons 57'; Hackney 59'			Stadium: Christie Park

13 April 2010 42	Bradford City	2–0	Morecambe	Bradford
	Rehman 69'; Bolder 90'			Stadium: Valley Parade

17 April 2010 43	Notts County	4–1	Morecambe	Nottingham
	Hughes 7', 18'; Ravenhill 18'; Davies 77'		Artell 73'	Stadium: Meadow Lane

24 April 2010 44	Morecambe	1–0	Dagenham & Redbridge	Morecambe
	Moss 86'			Stadium: Christie Park

1 May 2010 45	Shrewsbury Town	2–3	Morecambe	Shrewsbury
	van den Broek 23'; Bradshaw 48'		Duffy 9'; Artell 15', 48'	Stadium: New Meadow

8 May 2010 46	Morecambe	1–0	Aldershot Town	Morecambe
	Hunter 72'			Stadium: Christie Park

=== Football League Two play-offs ===
16 May 2010 SF Leg 1	Dagenham & Redbridge	6–0	Morecambe	London
	Benson 4', 66'; Scott 35', 48', 54', 69'			Stadium: Victoria Road

20 May 2010 SF Leg 2	Morecambe	2–1 (2–7 agg.)	Dagenham & Redbridge	Morecambe
	Duffy 81'; Artell 90'		Benson 85'	Stadium: Christie Park

=== FA Cup ===
7 November 2009 1	Carlisle United	2–2	Morecambe	Carlisle
	Harte 21'; Pericard 55'		Jevons 70'; Drummond (red card) 79'; Duffy 85'	Stadium: Brunton Park; Attendance: 4,181

17 November 2009 1 Replay	Morecambe	0–1	Carlisle United	Morecambe
			Anyinsah 5'	Stadium: Christie Park; Attendance: 3,307

=== League Cup ===
11 August 2009 1	Preston North End	5–1	Morecambe	Preston
	Brown 33'		Twiss 90'	Stadium: Deepdale

=== Football League Trophy ===
1 September 2009 1	Morecambe	2–2 (a.e.t.) (2–4 p)	Carlisle United	Morecambe
	Hunter 3'; Curtis 56'		Kavanagh 48', 90'	Stadium: Christie Park
