= 2007 Conference National play-off final =

- Event: 2006–07 Football Conference
| Exeter City | Morecambe |
| 1 | 2 |
- Date: 20 May 2007
- Venue: Wembley Stadium, London
- Referee: Michael Oliver (Northumberland)
- Attendance: 40,043

The 2006–07 Conference National play-off final took place on 20 May 2007 between Morecambe and Exeter City. It was the fifth Conference National play-off final and the first to be played at Wembley Stadium. The attendance of 40,031 was the largest for a Conference National final at that time, with 22,000 of them supporting Exeter City.

== Match ==
=== Details ===
20 May 2007
14:00 BST

| Exeter City | 1–2 | Morecambe |
|---|---|---|
| Phillips 8' | Report | Thompson 42'; Carlton 82'; Curtis (penalty missed) |

Wembley Stadium, London
Attendance: 40,043
Referee: Michael Oliver (Northumberland)

| Exeter City | Morecambe |

| GK | 27 | Paul Jones |
| DF | 18 | Steve Tully |
| DF | 6 | Chris Todd (c) | Yellow card |
| DF | 16 | Rob Edwards |
| DF | 3 | Billy Jones |
| MF | 29 | Wayne Carlisle | | (substituted off) 53' |
| MF | 7 | Andy Taylor |
| MF | 4 | Matthew Gill | Red card |
| MF | 22 | Lee Elam | | (substituted off) 57' |
| MF | 10 | Jon Challinor |
| FW | 11 | Lee Phillips | | (substituted off) 36' |
Substitutes:
| MF | 8 | Jamie Mackie | | (substituted on) 57' |
| DF | 19 | Jon Richardson |
| MF | 33 | Paul Buckle |
| FW | 9 | Adam Stansfield | | (substituted on) 36' |
| FW | 20 | Richard Logan | | (substituted on) 53' |
Manager:
Paul Tisdale

| GK | 30 | Scott Davies |
| DF | 2 | Adam Yates |
| DF | 5 | Jim Bentley (c) |
| DF | 17 | Chris Blackburn |
| DF | 25 | Danny Adams |
| MF | 11 | Garry Thompson | | (substituted off) 86' |
| MF | 6 | Craig Stanley |
| MF | 32 | Neil Sorvel |
| MF | 7 | Michael Twiss | | (substituted off) 72' |
| FW | 9 | Wayne Curtis |
| FW | 15 | Danny Carlton | Yellow card | (substituted off) 88' |
Substitutes:
| GK | 31 | Chris Neal |
| DF | 4 | Michael Howard |
| MF | 12 | Ged Brannan | | (substituted on) 86' |
| FW | 8 | Garry Hunter | | (substituted on) 72' |
| FW | 16 | David McNiven | | (substituted on) 88' |
Manager:
Sammy McIlroy

Match rules:

- 90 minutes.
- 30 minutes of extra time if necessary.
- Penalty shoot-out if scores still level.
- Five named substitutes
- Maximum of three substitutions.
