= Adam Yates (footballer) =

English footballer (born 1983)

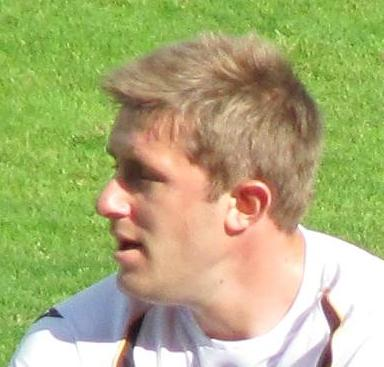
- Yates as a Port Vale player in September 2010.

Personal information
- Full name: Adam Paul Yates
- Date of birth: 28 May 1983 (age 43)
- Place of birth: Werrington, Staffordshire, England
- Height: 5 ft 10 in (1.78 m)
- Position: Right-back

Youth career
- 1992–2002: Crewe Alexandra

Senior career*
Years	Team	Apps	(Gls)
2002–2004	Crewe Alexandra	0	(0)
2003–2004	→ Halifax Town (loan)	12	(0)
2004–2006	Leek Town	80	(2)
2006–2009	Morecambe	121	(2)
2008	→ Burton Albion (loan)	6	(0)
2009–2018	Port Vale	212	(4)
2015	→ Northampton Town (loan)	1	(0)
2017	→ Macclesfield Town (loan)	7	(0)
Total		439	(8)

International career
2006–2007	England C	3	(0)
- * Club domestic league appearances and goals

Adam Paul Yates (born 28 May 1983) is an English former professional footballer who played as a right-back. He made 520 league and cup appearances in a 16-year career as a professional and also won three caps as a semi-pro international with England.

Having spent ten years at the Crewe Alexandra Academy, he turned professional with the club in 2002. He spent five months of the 2003–04 season on loan at Conference club Halifax Town, though he was released by his parent club at the end of the season, never having made a first-team appearance for Crewe. He then spent two seasons at Northern Premier League side Leek Town before he was signed by Morecambe in August 2006. He helped the club win promotion into the English Football League as the Conference National's play-off winners in 2007. He played 54 games in 2007–08, though he started the 2008–09 season on loan at Conference Premier club Burton Albion.

He signed with Port Vale in June 2009 and made the right-back slot his own in the 2009–10, 2010–11 and 2011–12 campaigns. He helped the club to secure promotion out of League Two in 2012–13. He lost his first-team place in August 2015 and was loaned to Northampton Town and then to Macclesfield Town in August 2017 to help him recover from a serious injury that kept him out of the entire 2016–17 season. However, he was forced to retire in March 2018 after picking up a serious head injury earlier in the season.

== Club career ==
=== Crewe Alexandra ===
Yates graduated through the ranks of the Crewe Alexandra youth system to become a professional in 2002 and spent five months on loan with Conference club Halifax Town from November to April of the 2003–04 season. He made his senior debut on 14 November, in a 2–2 draw at Burton Albion. Forced to compete with Darren Hockenhull for the right-back position at The Shay, Yates said that "It was a lot more competitive than the reserve team games I had been playing at Crewe". He was sent off for his part in a Boxing Day "mass brawl" during a 1–0 home victory over Scarborough; teammate James Dudgeon and opposition players Matt Redmile and Wayne Gill were also dismissed. He played a total of 13 games for Halifax. After being released by "Railwaymen" manager Dario Gradi in May 2004, never having made the first-team at Gresty Road, he signed for Leek Town.

=== Leek Town ===
In February 2005, he had a trial with Port Vale, the team he had supported as a boy, but did not impress manager Martin Foyle and was not signed to a contract. Instead he returned to Harrison Park and became an almost permanent presence in the "Blues" defence during 2005–06 season, putting in a total of fifty appearances, also scoring once in the Northern Premier League.

=== Morecambe ===
After impressing Sammy McIlroy in a pre-season friendly in 2006, he was signed by Morecambe in August 2006. He scored his first goal for Morecambe in their 2–1 victory at Southport on 26 December 2006. His return to the English Football League came at the end of the 2006–07 season as the "Shrimps" achieved promotion from the Conference National as play-off winners by beating Exeter City 2–1 in the final at Wembley Stadium. He made 54 appearances in the 2007–08 campaign, as Morecambe consolidated their Football League status. He was loaned to Burton Albion in August 2008. Immediately on his return to Christie Park in October he returned to the first-team. After having featured heavily in the 2008–09 season, Morecambe offered him a new contract, though he rejected the offer after deciding his future lay elsewhere.

=== Port Vale ===
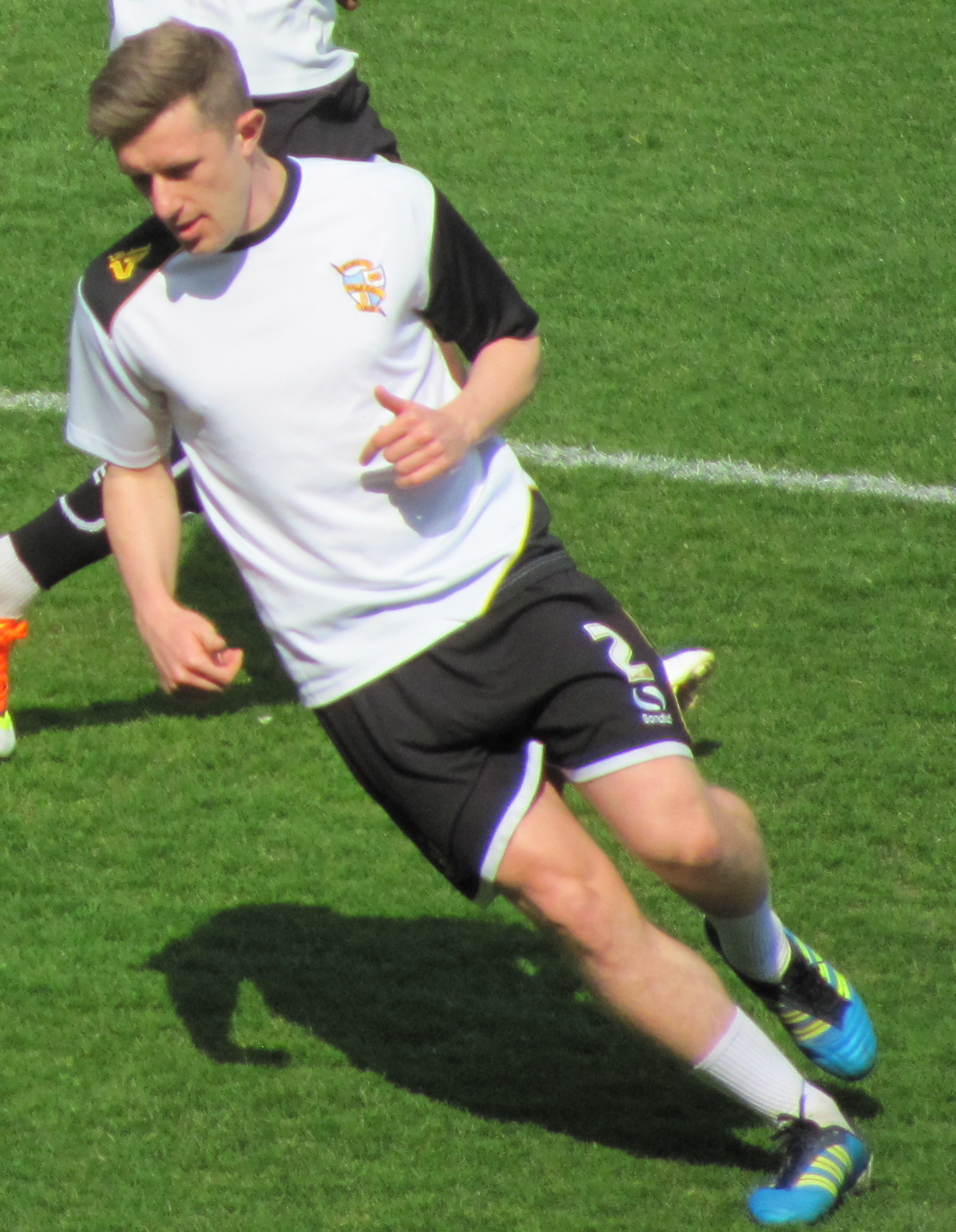
Yates warming up for Port Vale before the match against Northampton Town on 20 April 2013.

Targeted by manager Dean Glover, Port Vale continued the hunt for his signature even after Glover's departure. Yates decided to wait until a manager was appointed before signing for the club, and after Micky Adams was made manager Yates signed a two-year deal with the Vale. He was forced to wait until 22 August before he made his competitive debut for the club, as Sam Stockley had impressed in the right-back position in the pre-season and opening few games of the 2009–10 season. He was transfer listed in late September, along with the entire Port Vale squad, after manager Micky Adams saw his team slip to a third consecutive defeat. Following Stockley's retirement in November, Yates was expected to fill the void, though he faced competition for the right-wing-back spot from Anthony Griffith. In his first game in almost a month he scored his first goal at Vale Park, scoring the opener of a 1–1 draw with Stevenage Borough in the FA Cup first round. By February 2010 he was managing to maintain a first-team place, helped by the team's change of formation from 3–4–3 to 4–4–2.

He continued to make the right-back spot his own in the 2010–11 season, and in February 2011 he became the first player to enter new contract negotiations with new manager Jim Gannon. Despite Gannon's swift departure, contract talks continued on a new two-year deal. After playing in all 54 of the club's games that season, he put pen to paper on the deal in May 2011. Micky Adams returned as manager for the 2011–12 campaign, and he continued to name Yates as his first-choice right-back. However, Adams signed centre-back Liam Chilvers and veteran full-back Rob Kozluk in September, and so Yates lost his first-team place to Kozluk, and put in 'extra work' in training to try and force his way back onto the teamsheet. His efforts paid off, as he quickly won his first-team place back, and Kozluk was released in December. He scored his first league goal for the club by providing the equaliser in the 2–1 Boxing Day victory at Hereford United. In February, he picked up knee ligament damage and was unable to play for several weeks. He hit his third goal for the "Valiants" on 9 April, in a 1–0 win over Macclesfield Town.

He lost his first-team place to Richard Duffy at the start of the 2012–13 season. He was returned to the starting line-up at the end of October after Duffy was sidelined with a twisted ankle. Duffy returned to the first-team after making his recovery. However, Yates was preferred in the end-of-season run-in and hoped to win a new contract in the summer. He was named in the League Two Team of the Week for his performance in a 3–2 win at Dagenham & Redbridge on 29 December. Vale secured promotion with a third-place finish at the end of the season, with Yates making 32 appearances. He agreed to sign a new two-year contract in the summer. Yates remained a key first-team player during the 2013–14 season and played 41 games as the club posted a ninth-place finish in League One. Swiss youth international Frédéric Veseli was brought in on loan to replace him at right-back. Still, Yates won back his first-team place in November after consistent performances. He ended the season with 28 appearances to his name as Veseli eventually won back his first-team place. Yates signed a new one-year contract in June 2015.

Having held the club's number 2 shirt for five seasons, he was demoted to number 16 for the 2015–16 season as new right-back Ben Purkiss was handed the number 2 shirt. On 24 August, Yates joined League Two side Northampton Town on a one-month loan in order to provide "Cobblers" manager Chris Wilder with cover for the suspended Josh Lelan and injured Brendan Moloney. He played three games for the club, including a League Cup defeat to Newcastle United at St James' Park, before his loan spell was ended early by a thigh injury. He then returned to the Vale first-team on 14 November as cover for an injured Purkiss. His performances meant he retained his place once Purkiss returned to fitness. He signed a new one-year contract in June 2016. However, the following month he was told by surgeons that he had been playing for months with an ankle cruciate ligament injury and was ruled out of action for the whole of the 2016–17 season to allow the injury to heal properly. He was named as Community Foundation Trust Player of the Year in May 2017 and signed a new one-year contract with the club three months later.

On 5 August 2017, Yates joined National League side Macclesfield Town on a one-month loan to help with his return to match fitness. He made his debut for John Askey's "Silkmen" later that day in a 1–0 victory at Wrexham. He made seven appearances during his stay at Moss Rose. After returning to Port Vale, he collided with goalkeeper Sam Hornby during a reserve team match with former club Morecambe in November and came out with a fractured nose, cheekbones and eye sockets as well as a broken upper jaw and wrist; manager Neil Aspin said "I have never seen, on a football pitch, someone get the extent of the injuries he has got". He was given an extension to his contract the following month, with chairman Norman Smurthwaite saying "I felt it was our duty to support a player who had given so much service to the club". Yates announced his retirement as a player in March 2018, though stayed on at the club to work at the Port Vale Foundation Trust. At the end of the 2017–18 season he was named as Community Player of the Year and Clubman of the Year. After a public vote held in December 2019, he was named by The Sentinel as Port Vale's best right-back of the 2010s with 62% of the vote, ahead of James Gibbons (27%) and Ben Purkiss (11%).

== International career ==
Yates made his England National Game XI debut against the Netherlands in a 4–1 victory on 29 November 2006. Named in a friendly against Northern Ireland in February 2007, he was unable to feature due to injury. He was also named in the 2007 Four Nations Tournament squad for England.

== Style of play ==
Yates was a right-back who was able to create chances with his crossing ability and had good natural fitness.

== Personal and later life ==
Yates has two younger brothers, Ryan and Dominic; Ryan played for the Crewe Alexandra Academy. Yates was raised in Werrington, Staffordshire and attended Painsley High School in Cheadle. He was in the same year with Port Vale teammate Gareth Owen. Yates left the school with one A*, five Bs and four Cs at GCSE level. He went on to complete a degree in Professional Sports Writing and Broadcasting at Staffordshire University, alongside Port Vale teammates Gareth Owen, Justin Richards, and Ritchie Sutton. Yates and teammate Tom Pope began the 2011–12 season as joint-managers of local amateur Sunday League side Sneyd, fitting their management duties around their professional careers at Vale Park. The pair took the club to the Potteries and District Premier Division title and the final of the Sentinel Sunday Cup in 2012–13.

After retiring as a player, Yates began working at the Hubb Foundation charity, run by Port Vale chairwoman Carol Shanahan. He also worked as a matchday summariser for BBC Radio Stoke.

== Career statistics ==
Appearances and goals by club, season and competition
Club	Season	League			FA Cup		EFL Cup		Other		Total	
Club	Season	Division	Apps	Goals	Apps	Goals	Apps	Goals	Apps	Goals	Apps	Goals
Crewe Alexandra	2002–03	Second Division	0	0	0	0	0	0	0	0	0	0
Crewe Alexandra	2003–04	First Division	0	0	0	0	0	0	—		0	0
Crewe Alexandra	Total		0	0	0	0	0	0	0	0	0	0
Halifax Town (loan)	2003–04	Conference	12	0	0	0	—		1 (Note: Appearance(s) in the Football League Trophy / EFL Trophy.)	0	13	0
Leek Town	2004–05	Northern Premier League; Premier Division	39	1	6	0	—		8 (Note: 1 appearance in the FA Trophy, 1 appearance in the League Cup, 4 appearances in the Staffordshire Senior Cup and 2 appearances in the President's Cup)	0	53	1
Leek Town	2005–06	Northern Premier League; Premier Division	41	1	4	0	—		5 (Note: 1 appearance in the FA Trophy, 2 appearances in the Staffordshire Senior Cup and 2 appearances in the League Cup)	0	50	1
Leek Town	Total		80	2	10	0	0	0	13	0	103	2
Morecambe	2006–07	Conference National	45	2	2	0	—		4 (Note: 2 appearances in the FA Trophy and 2 appearances in the play-offs.)	0	51	2
Morecambe	2007–08	League Two	44	0	1	0	3	0	6	0	54	0
Morecambe	2008–09	League Two	32	0	2	0	0	0	1	0	35	0
Morecambe	Total		121	2	5	0	3	0	11	0	140	2
Burton Albion (loan)	2008–09	Conference Premier	6	0	0	0	—		0	0	6	0
Port Vale	2009–10	League Two	32	0	2	1	2	0	1	0	37	1
Port Vale	2010–11	League Two	46	0	4	0	2	0	2	0	54	0
Port Vale	2011–12	League Two	38	2	2	0	1	0	1	0	42	2
Port Vale	2012–13	League Two	26	0	2	0	1	0	3	0	32	0
Port Vale	2013–14	League One	34	1	5	0	1	0	1	0	41	1
Port Vale	2014–15	League One	25	1	1	0	1	0	1	0	28	1
Port Vale	2015–16	League One	11	0	1	0	0	0	0	0	12	0
Port Vale	2016–17	EFL League One	0	0	0	0	0	0	0	0	0	0
Port Vale	2017–18	EFL League Two	0	0	0	0	0	0	2	0	2	0
Port Vale	Total		212	4	17	1	8	0	11	0	248	5
Northampton Town (loan)	2015–16	League Two	1	0	0	0	1	0	1	0	3	0
Macclesfield Town (loan)	2017–18	National League	7	0	0	0	—		0	0	7	0
Career total			439	8	32	1	12	0	37	0	520	9

== Honours ==
Morecambe

- Conference National play-offs: 2007

Port Vale

- Football League Two third-place promotion: 2012–13
