= Ryan Cresswell =

English footballer (born 1987)

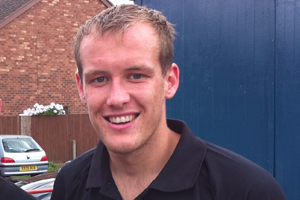
- Cresswell in 2010

Personal information
- Full name: Ryan Anthony Cresswell
- Date of birth: 22 December 1987 (age 38)
- Place of birth: Rotherham, England
- Height: 6 ft 1 in (1.85 m)
- Position: Centre back

Team information
- Current team: Spennymoor Town (assistant manager)

Youth career
- –2006: Sheffield United

Senior career*
Years	Team	Apps	(Gls)
2006–2008	Sheffield United	0	(0)
2007	→ Halifax Town (loan)	15	(0)
2007	→ Rotherham United (loan)	3	(0)
2007	→ Morecambe (loan)	2	(0)
2008	→ Macclesfield Town (loan)	19	(1)
2008	→ Ferencváros (loan)	0	(0)
2008–2010	Bury	53	(1)
2010–2012	Rotherham United	38	(8)
2012–2013	Southend United	43	(6)
2013–2014	Fleetwood Town	21	(1)
2014–2016	Northampton Town	56	(7)
2016–2018	Eastleigh	28	(2)
2019	Mickleover Sports		
2019	Boston United	4	(1)
2019	Bradford (Park Avenue)	6	(0)
2019–2020	Romford	3	(0)
2020	Parkgate		
2021	Parkgate		

Managerial career
- 2021: Parkgate
- 2021–2024: Sheffield
- 2024–2025: Matlock Town
- 2026: Matlock Town (interim)
- 2026: Matlock Town
- * Club domestic league appearances and goals as of 12:26, 12 March 2020 (UTC)

Ryan Anthony Cresswell (born 22 December 1987) is an English former professional footballer who is currently the assistant manager of Spennymoor Town.

A graduate of the Sheffield United youth academy, Cresswell failed to break in the first team and was hence loaned to clubs in the lower divisions of English football. In 2008, after being released by Sheffield United, he signed for Bury in League Two. Playing more than 50 matches for the club, he joined Rotherham United two seasons later.

Cresswell again changed clubs in 2012, penning a contract for Southend United. He was named in the League Two PFA Team of the Year for the 2012–13 season. The following season, he was transferred to Fleetwood Town, with whom he won promotion to League One. In 2014, after failing to make much impact at Fleetwood he again came to League Two, joining Northampton Town

== Career ==
=== Early career ===
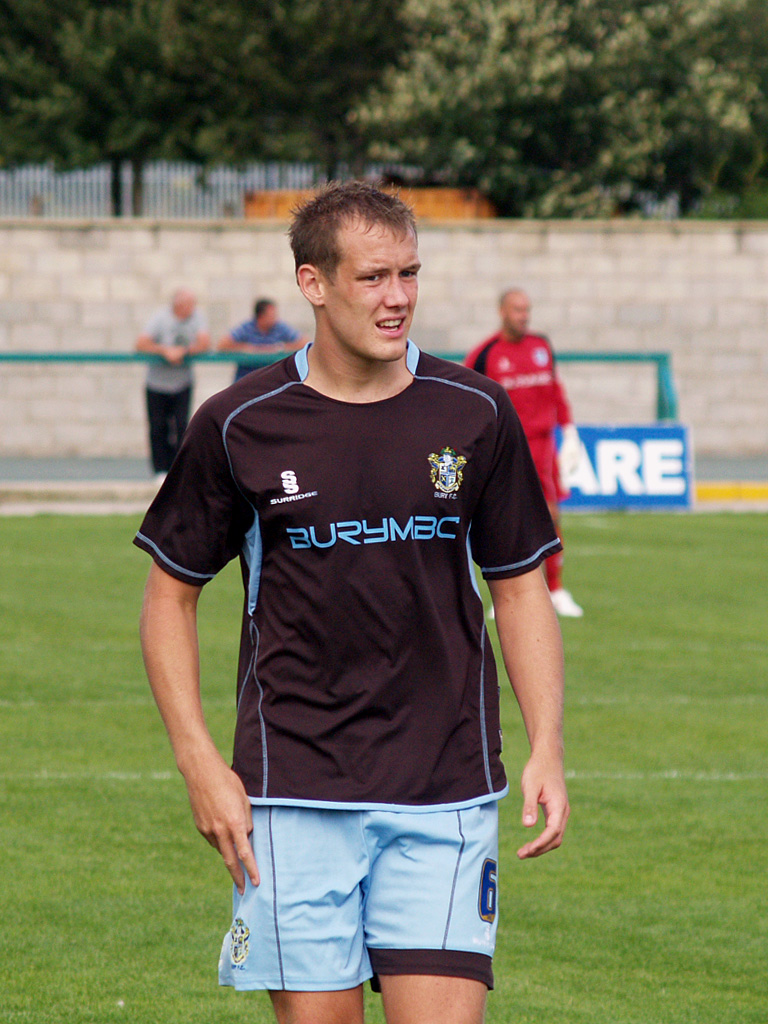
Cresswell playing for Bury in 2008

Cresswell was born in Rotherham, South Yorkshire. He started his career with Sheffield United, with whom he signed his first professional contract in July 2006. He got his first taste of first-team football with non-league Halifax Town where he was loaned during the 2006–07 season.

Cresswell went out on loan again at the start of the 2007–08 season, spending time at Rotherham United. Sheffield United recalled him however because they did not think he was playing enough games having started only two games for the Millers, and making two substitute appearances. He was quickly loaned out again, this time to Morecambe but only managed a further two league appearances at Christie Park.

He joined Macclesfield Town on loan for the remainder of the season in January 2008 where he played 19 times, scoring one goal.

During the close season he agreed to a one-year loan deal with one of Sheffield United's many partner clubs Ferencváros.

Despite joining up with Ferencváros for pre-season training only a few weeks after agreeing the loan move Cresswell joined Bury on 2008. He made his Bury debut as late substitute in the first game of the season in a 1–0 win at home to Brentford on 9 August 2008. Cresswell got his first goal for Bury on 1 November in a 1–0 win at Notts County. He was red carded in the last match of the season against Chester City. In the second season with the club Cresswell made 31 appearances, scoring in none.

=== Rotherham United ===
In June 2010, Cresswell joined Rotherham United on a three-year deal for an undisclosed fee. He scored on his debut, finding the net in the 88th minute against Lincoln City He again found the net, in a high scoring match of 10 goals against Cheltenham Town, helping the team to overturn a three-one deficit. He ended the first season with Rotherham scoring 5 goals in 26 matches, getting 3 yellow cards.

In the following season, with the arrival of Andy Scott as the manager, he fell in the pecking order, and made limited appearance. Cresswell was however again made regular in the senior team after Darren Patterson's appointment. He scored goals in consecutive two matches twice, once against Accrington Stanley and Torquay United, and another against Cheltenham Town and in a defeat against Shrewsbury Town. He was red carded in the last match of the season against Morecambe after picking a second yellow card.

=== Southend United ===
On 3 July 2012, Cresswell signed for League Two club Southend United on a two-year contract, after Rotherham allowed him to talk to other clubs. On 25 August 2012, Cresswell scored his first goal for Southend, a 92-minute equaliser in a 3–3 draw with Northampton Town. On 4 September 2012 Cresswell scored another injury time goal, this time it proved to be the winner as Southend triumphed 2–1 over AFC Wimbledon in the first round of the Football League Trophy.

Creswell, along with teammate Sean Clohessy, was named in the League Two PFA Team of the Year for 2012–13.

=== Fleetwood Town ===
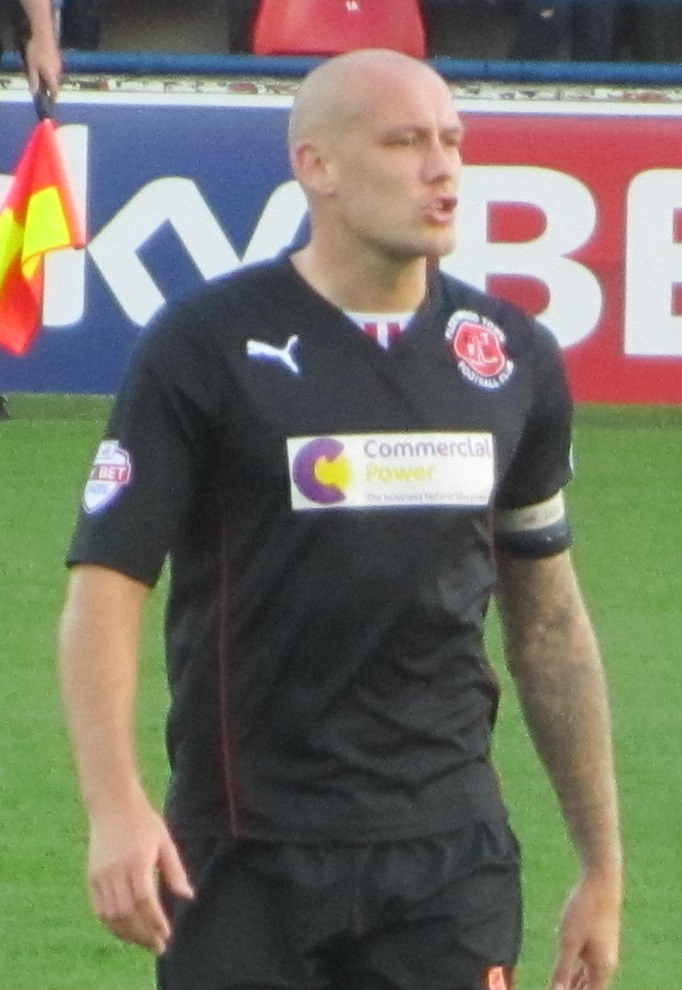
Cresswell playing for Fleetwood Town in 2013

On 23 July 2013, Cresswell joined Fleetwood Town on a two-year contract for an undisclosed fee, with Southend manager Phil Brown stating that the reasoning was that Cresswell wanted to return to Northern England. On the opening game of the season, he scored a 56th-minute goal in a 3–1 victory against Dagenham & Redbridge. He ended the first season with Fleetwood, making 26 appearances in all competitions, as Fleetwood won promotion into League One.

=== Northampton Town ===
On 1 September 2014, Cresswell signed for Northampton Town for an undisclosed fee on a three-year contract. He made his debut for the club against Dagenham & Redbridge. He scored his first goal for the club in a 1–1 draw against Wycombe Wanderers with a header from Joel Byrom's cross in the 31st minute. He was voted the club's Player of the month for November 2014. In January 2015, Southend manager Phil Brown revealed that he wanted to resign Cresswell in the summer transfer window, but the financial strains of the club prevented him from doing so.

=== Eastleigh ===
In August 2016 Cresswell joined National League club Eastleigh.

=== Boston United ===
After suffering a serious injury, his Eastleigh contract was terminated by mutual consent in December 2018. In 2019 he had a trial for York City for 3 weeks but wasn't signed permanently and chose to sign for Mickleover Sports. He joined Boston United on 22 March 2019 making his debut a day later.

=== Bradford (Park Avenue) and Romford ===
On 12 July 2019, Cresswell joined Bradford (Park Avenue). After playing six games, he left the club and joined Romford on 19 November 2019. He left Romford in January 2020.

=== Parkgate ===
In March 2020, Cresswell signed with Parkgate. Cresswell turned out for Parkgate in 2020.

== Coaching career ==
At the end of May 2021, Cresswell was hired as a part of Parkgate's first team coaching staff. In September 2021, he was also registered as a part of the playing squad.

On 9 November 2021, Cresswell was appointed manager of Sheffield.

On 16 September 2024, Cresswell was appointed manager at Matlock Town. He departed the club by mutual consent on 16 March 2025. In March 2026, he was appointed interim manager following the sacking of Adam Clayton. Following the end of the 2025-26 season, Cresswell returned as manager. He joined Doncaster Rovers as under-18s lead coach in July 2026.

In September 2026, Cresswell joined National League North club Spennymoor Town as assistant manager to the newly appointed Peter Hartley.

== Career statistics ==
As of match played 21 November 2017

Appearances and goals by club, season and competition
Club	Season	League			FA Cup		League Cup		Other		Total	
Club	Season	Division	Apps	Goals	Apps	Goals	Apps	Goals	Apps	Goals	Apps	Goals
Sheffield United	2006–07	Premier League	0	0	0	0	0	0	—		0	0
Sheffield United	2007–08	Championship	0	0	0	0	0	0	—		0	0
Sheffield United	Total		0	0	0	0	0	0	—		0	0
Halifax Town (loan)	2006–07	Conference National	15	0	—		—		1 (Note: Appearance in FA Trophy)	0	16	0
Rotherham United (loan)	2007–08	League Two	3	0	—		—		1 (Note: Appearances in Football League Trophy)	0	4	0
Morecambe (loan)	2007–08	League Two	2	0	—		—		—		2	0
Macclesfield Town (loan)	2007–08	League Two	19	1	—		—		—		19	1
Bury	2008–09	League Two	25	1	1	0	0	0	2	0	28	1
Bury	2009–10	League Two	28	0	1	0	0	0	2	0	31	0
Bury	Total		53	1	2	0	0	0	4	0	59	1
Rotherham United	2010–11	League Two	22	4	1	0	1	0	2	1	26	5
Rotherham United	2011–12	League Two	16	4	0	0	1	0	0	0	17	4
Rotherham United	Total		38	8	1	0	2	0	2	1	43	9
Southend United	2012–13	League Two	43	6	5	0	0	0	6	2	54	8
Fleetwood Town	2013–14	League Two	20	1	1	0	1	0	4 (Note: Three appearances in Football League Trophy, one in League Two play-offs)	0	26	1
Fleetwood Town	2014–15	League One	1	0	—		0	0	—		1	0
Fleetwood Town	Total		21	1	1	0	1	0	4	0	27	1
Northampton Town	2014–15	League Two	32	5	2	0	—		2	0	36	5
Northampton Town	2015–16	League Two	24	2	3	0	2	0	2	0	31	2
Northampton Town	Total		56	7	5	0	2	0	4	0	67	7
Eastleigh	2016–17	National League	15	1	1	0	—		0	0	16	1
Eastleigh	2017–18	National League	3	0	0	0	—		0	0	3	0
Eastleigh	Total		18	1	1	0	—		0	0	19	1
Career total			268	25	15	0	5	0	22	3	310	28

== Honours ==
Southend United

- Football League Trophy runner-up: 2012–13

Northampton Town

- Football League Two: 2015–16

Individual

- PFA Team of the Year: 2012–13 League Two
