= Michael Twiss =

Professional footballer (born 1977)

Personal information
- Full name: Michael John Twiss
- Date of birth: 26 December 1977 (age 48)
- Place of birth: Salford, England
- Height: 5 ft 11 in (1.80 m)
- Position: Midfielder

Youth career
- 1994–1996: Manchester United

Senior career*
Years	Team	Apps	(Gls)
1996–2000	Manchester United	0	(0)
1998–1999	→ Sheffield United (loan)	12	(1)
2000–2001	Port Vale	18	(2)
2001–2002	Leigh RMI	33	(15)
2002–2004	Chester City	64	(11)
2004–2010	Morecambe	205	(53)
2010	Stalybridge Celtic	10	(0)
2010–2012	Altrincham	64	(9)
Total		406	(91)
- * Club domestic league appearances and goals

Michael John Twiss (born 26 December 1977) is an English former footballer who played as a midfielder. He scored 95 goals in 458 competitive matches in a 15-year career.

Beginning his career with Manchester United, he enjoyed a loan spell with Sheffield United without ever making a league appearance for the "Red Devils". He signed with Port Vale in July 2000, moving on to non-League Leigh RMI a year later. In 2002, he transferred to Chester City, joining Morecambe two years later. He won promotion into the English Football League with both clubs, helping Chester to the Conference title in 2003–04 and playing for the "Shrimps" in their play-off final success in 2007. After six years with Morecambe, he moved on to Altrincham via Stalybridge Celtic in 2010.

== Career ==
=== Manchester United ===
Born in Salford, Greater Manchester, Twiss was signed as a trainee at Manchester United in July 1994, but despite turning professional two years later and being a regular in the reserve team from 1997 to 2000, he failed to make the grade at Old Trafford. On 25 February 1998, he made his debut for the first team, coming on as a 79th-minute substitute in the 3–2 defeat to Barnsley in the FA Cup fifth round replay at Oakwell. He won the Denzil Haroun Reserve Team Player of the Year award for the 1997–98 season. Twiss made his first start for United on 13 October 1999, playing 73 minutes in the 3–0 defeat at Aston Villa in the League Cup third round, before being replaced by Richie Wellens. This turned out to be his last appearance for the club and, he was released at the end of the 1999–2000 season. He had a trial at Norwich City in February 2000 after being recommended by Philip Mulryne, but was not offered a contract by manager Bruce Rioch despite scoring in his second reserve team trial game. He later had trials at Preston North End and Tranmere Rovers.

==== Sheffield United (loan) ====
He spent most of the 1998–99 season on loan with Sheffield United in the First Division. His first senior goal came on 28 December, scoring a late winner over Huddersfield Town in a 2–1 victory at Bramall Lane. He returned to Manchester United in March 1999, having only started four games for the Blades, coming on as a substitute 13 times.

=== Port Vale ===
In July 2000 he signed a one-month deal with Brian Horton's Port Vale, after impressing on trial. A regular at the start of the 2000–01 season, he fell out of favour in October. He played in Vale's FA Cup exit to Canvey Island of the Isthmian League on 28 November, before being put up for sale the next month. With no takers, he was a semi-regular at Vale Park for the rest of the season. He was on the bench for the Football League Trophy final at Millennium Stadium, as the "Valiants" recorded a 2–1 win over Brentford.

=== Leigh RMI ===
He joined Football Conference club Leigh RMI in time for the start of the 2001–02 season. There, Twiss found himself at a more comfortable level and had a successful season at the club, scoring 15 goals in 34 games, becoming the club's top scorer.

=== Chester City ===
He joined Conference rivals Chester City for the 2001–02 season. He had a quiet season in 2002–03, but did make 36 appearances in all competitions. He did not play in either leg of the play-off semi-final defeat to Doncaster Rovers. The 2003–04 season saw Chester promoted as champions, Twiss scoring six goals in 31 games despite being absent from manager Mark Wright's first-team plans from October to January. In January 2004 Morecambe offered Chester £5,000 for his services, but the deal did not go through.

=== Morecambe ===
Twiss remained in the Conference for the 2004–05 season, signing with Morecambe in May 2004, after rejecting a new contract at Chester. Performing well at Christie Park, Ian Rush, now manager of old club Chester, offered Morecambe £50,000 for his return, a bid which was rejected. In March 2005 he was singled out for praise, due to his consistent scoring. Again a solid performer in the 2005–06 season, Morecambe crept into the play-offs, only to be defeated by Hereford United. Twiss scored 11 goals in the 2006–07 season before damaging medial ligaments in February. He did however, make it back in time for the play-offs, and was part of the Morecambe side that won the Conference play-off final 2–1 over Exeter City at Wembley. A long-term contract signed in December 2006 would keep him signed to Morecambe until June 2010. He helped Morecambe to survive in their first season in League Two, as they finished 11th and reached the semi-final of the Football League Trophy. Bury aimed to achieve his signature in July 2008, but did not get far. York City attempted to sign him in August 2008, but this ended as Twiss wanted to stay in the Lancashire area. After gradually falling out of favour he was released by Morecambe in March 2010.

=== Stalybridge Celtic ===
Twiss was immediately snapped up by Conference North side Stalybridge Celtic, managed by ex-Morecambe boss Jim Harvey. Twiss made his debut for Stalybridge in a 1–0 defeat against Southport on 8 March. He went on to make a total of ten appearances for the "Celts" in the remainder of the 2009–10 season, playing in three victories and seven defeats.

=== Altrincham ===
In June 2010, Twiss signed a one-year deal with Conference club Altrincham. After 16 starts and 16 substitute appearances in 2010–11, he signed a new contract the following summer, despite the club's relegation into the Conference North. He was released at the end of the 2011–12 season by manager Lee Sinnott, after Altrincham failed to reach the play-offs.

== Career statistics ==
Appearances and goals by club, season and competition
Season	Club	League			FA Cup		League Cup		Other		Total	
Season	Club	Division	Apps	Goals	Apps	Goals	Apps	Goals	Apps	Goals	Apps	Goals
Manchester United	1997–98	Premier League	0	0	1	0	0	0	0	0	1	0
Manchester United	1998–99	Premier League	0	0	0	0	0	0	0	0	0	0
Manchester United	1999–2000	Premier League	0	0	0	0	1	0	0	0	1	0
Manchester United	Total		0	0	1	0	1	0	0	0	2	0
Sheffield United (loan)	1998–99	First Division	12	1	5	0	0	0	0	0	17	1
Port Vale	2000–01	Second Division	18	2	2	0	2	0	2 (Note: Appearance(s) in the EFL Trophy.)	0	24	2
Leigh RMI	2001–02	Conference National	33	15	0	0	—		1	0	34	15
Chester City	2002–03	Conference National	35	5	0	0	—		1	0	36	5
Chester City	2003–04	Conference National	29	6	1	0	—		1	0	31	6
Chester City	Total		64	11	1	0	0	0	2	0	67	11
Morecambe	2004–05	Conference National	40	22	1	1	—		3 (Note: 2 appearances in the FA Trophy, 1 appearance in the play-offs.)	0	44	23
Morecambe	2005–06	Conference National	42	11	1	0	—		3 (Note: 1 appearance in the FA Trophy, 2 appearances and 1 goal in the play-offs.)	1	46	12
Morecambe	2006–07	Conference National	33	10	2	1	—		2 (Note: Appearance(s) in the FA Trophy.)	0	37	11
Morecambe	2007–08	League Two	36	6	0	0	3	0	6	0	45	6
Morecambe	2008–09	League Two	28	3	0	0	0	0	1	0	29	3
Morecambe	2009–10	League Two	26	1	2	0	1	1	1	0	30	2
Morecambe	Total		205	53	6	2	4	1	16	1	231	57
Stalybridge Celtic	2009–10	Conference North	10	0	0	0	—		0	0	10	0
Altrincham	2010–11	Conference National	32	4	0	0	—		6	0	38	4
Altrincham	2011–12	Conference North	32	5	0	0	—		3	0	35	5
Altrincham	Total		64	9	0	0	0	0	9	0	73	9
Career total			406	91	15	2	7	1	30	1	458	95

== Honours ==
Port Vale

- Football League Trophy: 2000–01

Chester City

- Conference: 2003–04

Morecambe

- Conference National play-offs: 2007

Individual

- Denzil Haroun Reserve Team Player of the Year: 1997–98
