= Aaron Taylor =

Aaron Taylor may refer to:

- Aaron Taylor (American football, born 1972), former NFL player, sports analyst
- Aaron Taylor (American football, born 1975), former college football player for the University of Nebraska
- Aaron Taylor (baseball) (born 1977), former Major League Baseball player
- Aaron Taylor (footballer) (born 1990), English professional footballer

== See also ==
- Aaron Taylor-Sinclair (born 1991), Scottish professional footballer
- Aaron Taylor-Johnson (born 1990), English actor
- Erin Taylor (born 1987), New Zealand sprint canoeist
- Erin Taylor-Talcott (born 1978), American racewalker
