= Scott Davies (footballer, born 1987) =

English footballer

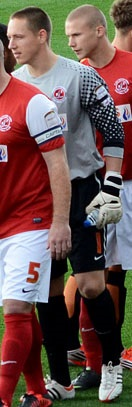
- Davies playing for Fleetwood Town in 2012

Personal information
- Full name: Scott David Davies
- Date of birth: 23 February 1987 (age 39)
- Place of birth: Blackpool, England
- Height: 6 ft 0 in (1.83 m)
- Position: Goalkeeper

Team information
- Current team: Oldham Athletic (goalkeeper coach)

Youth career
- –2005: Morecambe

Senior career*
Years	Team	Apps	(Gls)
2005–2010	Morecambe	16	(0)
2010–2015	Fleetwood Town	150	(0)
2014	→ Morecambe (loan)	10	(0)
2015	→ Accrington Stanley (loan)	19	(0)
2015–2022	Tranmere Rovers	238	(0)
Total		433	(0)
- * Club domestic league appearances and goals

Scott David Davies (born 23 February 1987) is an English former professional footballer who played as a goalkeeper. He is currently the goalkeeper coach at EFL League Two side Oldham Athletic.

Davies began his career at Morecambe in the Conference Premier. In 2010, he moved to local rival Fleetwood Town. He spent time on loan at Morecambe in 2014, before spending half of the season at Fleetwood's other local rival Accrington Stanley in 2015.

== Early life ==
Davies was born in Blackpool, Lancashire and attended Cardinal Allen Catholic High School.

== Career ==
=== Morecambe ===
==== Early career ====
Playing in the position of goalkeeper, he was a product of the club's youth academy, making the step up in 2005. Davies then had a trial period at Crewe Alexandra during the summer of 2006; however, a deal broke down when a transfer fee could not be agreed. His debut in a competitive first-team match for Morecambe came in the 1–0 Football League Trophy defeat at home to Bradford City on 22 November 2005, coming on in the second half as substitute for Ryan Robinson, who suffered an injury.

On 7 May 2007, during Morecambe's Conference National play-off semi-final second leg match at home to York City, fellow Morecambe goalkeeper Steven Drench fouled York City's Clayton Donaldson in the 19th minute and conceded a penalty kick, Drench also suffered a major injury during this collision and Davies was forced to come to face the penalty, which Steve Bowey converted, leaving Morecambe 1–0 down on aggregate, but two goals from Wayne Curtis put Morecambe through to the final, winning 2–1 on aggregate. Drench was ruled out of the Final, so Sammy McIlroy signed Preston North End goalkeeper Chris Neal on a short-term loan to provide cover and competition for Davies.

On 20 May 2007 Davies was picked in the starting line up ahead of Neal for the 2007 Conference National play-off final at Wembley Stadium against Exeter City. The game did not start well for Davies and Morecambe though when Lee Phillips scored in the eighth minute, but when the game progressed both Davies and Morecambe improved their performance, with Davies showing some good shot stopping skills and Morecambe scoring first Garry Thompson in the 42nd minute and Danny Carlton who scored a late goal in the 82nd minute. Davies came under pressure in the closing stages of the match, but kept his cool and did not let the ball into the net. The final score was Exeter City 1–2 Morecambe, with Morecambe earning promotion to the Football League for the first time in the club's 87-year history.

==== Football League ====
On 11 July 2007 Ronnie Jepson confirmed that the young goalkeeper was on trial at Gillingham with a view to a permanent deal, but after Jepson signed goalkeeper Derek Stillie for Gillingham, Davies returned to Christie Park and signed a new one-year contract with the Football League newcomers. On 1 March 2008, Davies made his Football League debut in the 4–0 defeat to Grimsby Town. On 3 June 2010 he left Morecambe to seek regular first team football.

=== Fleetwood Town ===
In June 2010 Davies signed for newly promoted Conference team Fleetwood Town. He was born and raised and lives near to Fleetwood, and went to high school in Fleetwood. He made his debut in a 1–1 draw against Crawley Town when Danny Hurst dislocated his shoulder in the second minute. He replaced Hurst and played in the 4–1 win over Kettering Town. Hurst left Fleetwood at the end of 2010–11 season and Davies replaced him as Fleetwood's number one choice goalkeeper.

=== Tranmere Rovers ===
On 30 June 2015, Davies signed for newly relegated National League club Tranmere Rovers on a one-year contract. After three years in this league, Davies and Tranmere were promoted to the EFL after a 2–1 win against Boreham Wood in 2018. Tranmere played 89 minutes with 10 men, after Liam Ridehalgh was dismissed for a dangerous tackle. After their first year back in the Football League, Tranmere secured a spot at Wembley in the Playoff final after beating rivals Forest Green Rovers 2–1 on aggregate. Davies won back to back promotions with Tranmere after beating Welsh side Newport County 1–0 in injury time.

Davies was named as captain at the start of the 2019–20 campaign after the departure of former captain Steve McNulty to York City. In October 2019 he signed a new contract with the club, until 2022.

In January 2022 it was announced he would be retiring from professional football at the end of his contract.

== Coaching career ==
Since June 2024, he has been the goalkeeper coach at Oldham Athletic. He moved to Boundary Park after previously working with the goalkeepers at the Fleetwood Town academy.

== Honours ==
Morecambe

- Conference National play-offs: 2007

Fleetwood Town

- Conference Premier: 2011–12

Tranmere Rovers

- National League play-offs: 2018
- EFL League Two play-offs: 2019
- EFL Trophy runner-up: 2020–21

Individual

- EFL League Two Golden Glove: 2018–19
