= Cardinal Allen Catholic High School =

Location
- Melbourne Avenue; Fleetwood, Lancashire, FY7 8JZ; England; 53.904°N 3.036°W

Information
- Type: Voluntary aided school
- Motto: “Living to make Christ known”
- Religious affiliation: Roman Catholic
- Established: 1963; 63 years ago
- Local authority: Lancashire
- Department for Education URN: 119799 Tables
- Ofsted: Reports
- Chair of Governors: P H Waters
- Headteacher: Andrew Cafferkey
- Staff: 105 (approx.)
- Gender: Mixed
- Age: 11 to 16
- Enrolment: 800 (approx)
- Houses: Aiden, Ambrose, Augustine, Bede, Columba, Gregory
- Colours: Blue & red
- Website: https://www.cardinalallen.co.uk

Cardinal Allen Catholic High School is a mixed 11–16 voluntary-aided Roman Catholic faith school in Fleetwood, Lancashire, England.

== Curriculum ==
Art, Craft and Design, Business and Communication Systems, Catering and Hospitality, Computer Science, Construction, Creative Technology, Digital Applications, Drama, English, Food and Nutrition, French, Geography, History, Information and Communication Technology, Maths, Music, Physical Education, Product Design, Personal Social Health Citizenship Economic Education, Religious Studies, Science, Spanish

== Attainment ==
KS4 Performance table indicating year on year comparisons for percentage achieving 5+ A*-C GCSEs (or equivalent) including English and maths GCSEs.

	2010	2011	2012	2013
School	57%	62%	49%	66%
LA	56.7%	60.1%	59.9%	61.2%
England - All Schools	53.5%	59%	59.4%	59.2%

== Awards ==
- Design Mark
- International School Award 2012 - 2015
- Specialist Schools and Academies Trust - High Performance at GCSE
- Lancashire Green Awards
- ICT Mark Accredited
- Geography Award 2013
- Eco Schools Ambassador Status

== Notable former pupils ==
- Alfie Boe, singer
- Scott Davies, footballer
- Tom Barkhuizen, footballer
- Alan Cripps, PepsiCo Director
