= Stef Frost =

English footballer

Personal information
- Full name: Stef Frost
- Date of birth: 3 July 1989 (age 37)
- Place of birth: Eastwood, England
- Height: 6 ft 2 in (1.88 m)
- Positions: Forward; winger

Youth career
- Notts County

Senior career*
Years	Team	Apps	(Gls)
2006–2009	Notts County	6	(0)
2007	→ Gainsborough Trinity (loan)	6	(0)
2007–2008	→ Gainsborough Trinity (loan)	5	(0)
2008	→ Matlock Town (loan)	3	(0)
2009	Hucknall Town	15	(5)
2009–2010	Matlock Town	4	(1)
2010	Stirling Lions	22	(5)
2010	Rainworth Miners Welfare	6	(4)
2010	Boston United	2	(0)
2011	Quorn	4	(1)
2011–2013	Heanor Town	38	(16)
2013	Borrowash Victoria	10	(5)
- * Club domestic league appearances and goals

Stef Frost (born 3 July 1989) is an English former footballer who played in the Football League for Notts County. Since November 2009 he has played for Matlock Town, Hucknall Town, Stirling Lions, Rainworth Miners Welfare, Boston United, Quorn, Heanor Town and Borrowash Victoria.

== Career ==
Frost began his football career in Notts County's youth system. He made his first-team debut as a 16-year-old, on 17 April 2006 as a second-half substitute in the League Two game away against Carlisle United which County won 2–1. He appeared in all three games remaining in the 2005–06 season, each time as a substitute, and signed a two-year professional contract that summer. Although he failed to break into the first team during 2006–07, he spent a month on loan to Conference North club Gainsborough Trinity to gain experience.

After three more first-team appearances, all from the bench, in 2007–08, Frost joined Gainsborough again, this time for two months, and then went on loan to Matlock Town of the Northern Premier League; the latter spell ended prematurely when he suffered a badly broken leg in March 2008. Frost was given a contract extension to prove his fitness, but after a trial with Mansfield Town, he signed for Hucknall Town in March 2009. Released as part of a cost-cutting exercise in October, Frost returned to former loan club Matlock Town. Frost then moved to Perth to play for Stirling Lions SC of the National Premier League in Western Australia. After a successful season, Stirling Lions won the state league Cup and were second in the league. Frost then returned to the UK and signed with Rainworth Miners Welfare. After only a handful of games he caught the eye of former teammate Jason Lee who was the manager of Boston United. Frost signed for Boston, but had a short stay during their 2010–11 season where they reached the playoffs and at the end of the season he was released along with four others. Frost went on to play for Quorn, Heanor Town and Borrowash Victoria.

Frost is a full-time UEFA B coach and has coached in the UK, Australia, Thailand and New Zealand.
