= Jamie Yates =

English footballer and coach

Personal information
- Full name: Jamie Yates
- Date of birth: 24 December 1988 (age 37)
- Place of birth: Sheffield, England
- Height: 5 ft 7 in (1.70 m)
- Position: Midfielder

Team information
- Current team: Doncaster Rovers

Senior career*
Years	Team	Apps	(Gls)
2006–2009	Rotherham United	34	(3)
2009	→ Burton Albion (loan)	6	(1)
2009	Alfreton Town	2	(0)
2009–2011	Boston United	77	(8)
2011–2015	Gainsborough Trinity	152	(9)
2014–2016	North Ferriby United	50	(3)
2016–2017	Matlock Town	27	(3)
2017–2024	Sheffield FC	124	(9)
- * Club domestic league appearances and goals as of 21:41, 16 October 2014 (UTC)

Jamie Yates (born 24 December 1988) is a Uefa A License English football coach and a former professional footballer who is the Lead Professional Development Phase Coach of Doncaster Rovers

As a player he is a midfielder who notably played in the Football League for Rotherham United, before going on to spend the rest of his career in non-league football with Burton Albion, Alfreton Town, Boston United, Gainsborough Trinity, North Ferriby United, Matlock Town and lastly Sheffield FC

== Playing career ==
=== Rotherham United ===
He signed a new one-year contract with Rotherham in May 2008. Yates was released from the club in June 2009 after making 34 appearances scoring 3 goals. Notably scoring v Mansfield in 2008 sending them to the national league in a 0-1 Victory at Field Mill.

In January 2009, Yates joined Conference National club Burton Albion initially on a month's loan, which was subsequently extended to the end of the season. He scored his first goal for Burton in a 0–1 win away to Grays Athletic on his league debut for the club, a match which also set a new conference record of twelve consecutive wins.

=== Non-League ===
After a successful spell at Boston United winning promotion to the National League North and making 77 appearances across almost 20 months. Yates signed for rivals Gainsborough Trinity in 2011 going on to make 152 appearances in 2 spells including reaching the national league north play off final and the FA Trophy Semi Final v Wrexham

In September 2017 Jamie Yates signed for Current club Sheffield FC, he collaborates a playing role alongside being Assistant Manager to Ryan Cresswell. In September 2024, Sheffield FC made Yates the First Team Manager after Ryan Cresswell left for Matlock Town. After 14 games as manager Jamie Yates resigned from the club citing personal reasons for his departure after 7 years at the club.

== Coaching career ==
In 2015 Yates was appointed head coach of Matlock Town youth system, which saw him develop and see several players go into the professional and semi professional game. In 2019 Yates left Matlock and was appointed player/coach of Sheffield FC, a role which involved working closely with the club's youth system in partnership with Leeds United.

In January 2022, Yates returned to his first club Rotherham United as football development officer, a role which involves being lead coach of the clubs development sides whilst continuing his position with Sheffield FC.

On 1 July 2022, he was appointed as assistant manager of Sheffield after helping keep the club in the Northern Premier League East the previous season working with manager, Ryan Cresswell. On 29 April 2024 it was announced that Yates would sign a new 2-year contract alongside manager Cresswell until 2026 after a consecutive mid table finish in the league table in 2023 & 2024.

On November 14th 2025 after working on a part time basis with the clubs U16 Age group Jamie Yates was appointed the Lead Youth Development Phase coach within the academy at Rotherham United.

On the 2nd of October 2026 , Doncaster Rovers made an official approach for Jamie Yates to become their new U18 Coach. Yates Accepted the role and began work a month later sighting this was his natural next step in his coaching career .
