= Andy Langford =

English footballer

Personal information
- Full name: Andrew James Langford
- Date of birth: 3 July 1988 (age 38)
- Place of birth: Manchester, England
- Position: Defender

Senior career*
Years	Team	Apps	(Gls)
2006–2008	Morecambe	0	(0)
2008–2011	Workington	?	(?)
2011–?	Droylsden	?	(?)
- * Club domestic league appearances and goals as of 14:11, 16 March 2012 (UTC)

Andrew James Langford (born 3 July 1988 in Manchester, England) is an English footballer.

== Career ==
Langford began his career with Morecambe in 2006 and made his first appearance in a 1–0 victory over Tranmere Rovers in the Football League Trophy on 4 September 2007.

He joined Workington. in December 2008 ahead of the club's FA Trophy tie against King's Lynn. He then joined Droylsden in 2011.
