= Jim Bentley =

English footballer and manager (born 1976)

Personal information
- Full name: James Graham Bentley
- Date of birth: 11 June 1976 (age 50)
- Place of birth: Liverpool, Merseyside, England
- Position: Centre back

Youth career
- –1997: Manchester City

Senior career*
Years	Team	Apps	(Gls)
1997–2002	Telford United	75	(14)
2002–2011	Morecambe	292	(29)
Total		367	(43)

Managerial career
- 2011–2019: Morecambe
- 2019–2022: AFC Fylde
- 2022–2023: Rochdale
- 2023–2025: Southport
- 2026: Morecambe
- * Club domestic league appearances and goals

James Graham Bentley (born 11 June 1976) is an English professional football manager and former player who played as a centre back. He was most recently the manager of National League North club Morecambe.

== Playing career ==
Bentley debuted for Telford United in 1997, playing for the Shropshire club for 5 years.

He signed for Morecambe in 2002, managed at the time by Jim Harvey. In 2007, Bentley captained Morecambe to a 2–1 victory over Exeter City in the Conference National play off final, taking the club to the Football League for the first time in their history.

In June 2010, Bentley was appointed player-coach, having spent the previous season in a coaching role with the reserve team.

== Managerial career ==
On 13 May 2011, Bentley was appointed the player-manager of Morecambe on a two-year contract, but since then he has concentrated on the managerial role and did not play a competitive match after taking on the post. He signed a two-year contract extension with the Shrimps on 10 October 2013. A further two-year contract extension was agreed with Morecambe on 29 August 2015. Ken McKenna also agreed the same deal with the League Two club. On 13 October 2017, Bentley and McKenna agreed further contract extensions until the end of the 2019–20 season.

During Morecambe's 1–2 defeat to Cheltenham on 17 December 2016, Bentley was sent off from the dugout, after reacting to Alex Kenyon's dismissal. He received a £750 fine with £250 costs and a two match touchline ban from the FA after a personal hearing. At the following home game, a 4–1 victory over Notts County, Morecambe fans held a 'bucket collection' and raised the £1,000.

After the departure of Paul Tisdale from Exeter City in June 2018, Bentley became the longest serving manager in the top four tiers of English football, until his resignation in October 2019 to become the new manager of AFC Fylde. In March 2022, Bentley was sacked by the National League North club, which was in fourth place, 14 points off top spot.

On 29 August 2022, Bentley was appointed manager of League Two's bottom club Rochdale on a two-year contract. On 27 March 2023, Rochdale sacked him; under Bentley, the side had won just six out of 32 league games and were still bottom, ten points from safety with eight games remaining.

On 29 August 2023, exactly a year after his appointment at Rochdale, Bentley was appointed as manager of National League North club, Southport. At the time of his appointment Southport were at the foot of the table with only one point after six games. Having overseen a turnaround in form, he was awarded the Manager of the Month award for November 2023. He was sacked on 12 March 2025, the club sitting 17th in the league, 11 points clear from safety.

On 1 February 2026, six years after previously leaving the club, Bentley was reappointed as Morecambe manager for the rest of the 2025–26 National League season, replacing Ashvir Singh Johal. On 11 April 2026, Morecambe were relegated to the National League North following a 5–1 defeat at Woking. The club then announced Bentley would be standing down as manager at the end of the season, remaining with the club to support development across footballing and non-footballing areas.

== Career statistics ==
Appearances and goals by club, season and competition
Club	Season	Division	League		FA Cup		League Cup		Other		Total	
Club	Season	Division	Apps	Goals	Apps	Goals	Apps	Goals	Apps	Goals	Apps	Goals
Telford United	1999–2000	Conference	24	4	0	0	0	0	0	0	24	4
Telford United	2000–01	Conference	23	2	1	0	0	0	0	0	24	2
Telford United	2001–02	Conference	28	8	0	0	0	0	0	0	28	8
Telford United	Total		75	14	1	0	0	0	0	0	76	14
Morecambe	2002–03	Conference	23	3	3	2	0	0	3 (Note: 1 appearance in Football League Trophy) (Note: 2 appearance(s) in Conference play-offs)	0	29	5
Morecambe	2003–04	Conference	36	4	1	0	0	0	0	0	37	4
Morecambe	2004–05	Conference National	38	4	1	1	0	0	2 (Note: 1 appearance in FA Trophy)	0	41	5
Morecambe	2005–06	Conference National	40	4	1	0	0	0	4 (Note: 2 appearances in Football League Trophy) (Note: 2 appearances and 1 goal in Conference play-offs)	1	45	5
Morecambe	2006–07	Conference National	31	1	2	0	0	0	5 (Note: 2 appearances in FA Trophy) (Note: 3 appearances in Conference play-offs)	0	38	1
Morecambe	2007–08	League Two	43	6	1	0	3	1	2 (Note: Appearance(s) in Football League Trophy)	0	49	7
Morecambe	2008–09	League Two	45	3	1	0	1	0	3	0	50	3
Morecambe	2009–10	League Two	28	3	1	0	0	0	2 (Note: 1 appearance in League Two play-offs)	0	31	3
Morecambe	2010–11	League Two	8	1	0	0	0	0	1	0	9	1
Morecambe	Total		292	29	11	3	4	1	22	1	329	34
Career total			367	43	12	3	4	1	22	1	405	48

== Managerial statistics ==
As of match played 25 April 2026

Managerial record by team and tenure
Team	From	To	Record					Ref.
Team	From	To	P	W	D	L	Win %	Ref.
Morecambe	13 May 2011	28 October 2019	434	123	119	192	28.3	
AFC Fylde	28 October 2019	4 March 2022	75	35	17	23	46.7	
Rochdale	29 August 2022	27 March 2023	36	7	9	20	19.4	
Southport	29 August 2023	12 March 2025	85	29	18	38	34.1	
Morecambe	1 February 2026	25 April 2026	18	4	5	9	22.2	
Total			644	196	167	281	30.4	

== Honours ==
Individual

- League Two Manager of the Month: August 2014, August 2016
- National League North Manager of the Month: November 2023
