= Matthew Blinkhorn =

English footballer (born 1985)

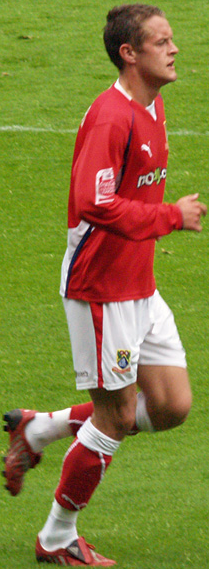
- Blinkhorn playing for Morecambe in 2008

Personal information
- Full name: Matthew David Blinkhorn
- Date of birth: 2 March 1985 (age 41)
- Place of birth: Blackpool, England
- Height: 5 ft 11 in (1.80 m)
- Position: Striker

Youth career
- –2001: Blackpool

Senior career*
Years	Team	Apps	(Gls)
2001–2007	Blackpool	44	(5)
2004	→ Luton Town (loan)	2	(0)
2006–2007	→ Bury (loan)	10	(0)
2007	→ Morecambe (loan)	12	(8)
2007–2009	Morecambe	52	(10)
2009–2011	Sligo Rovers	72	(22)
2012	York City	15	(1)
2012–2013	Hyde	30	(7)
2013	→ AFC Fylde (loan)	2	(1)
2013–2018	AFC Fylde		
2018–2021	Lancaster City	36	(6)

Managerial career
- 2018: Lancaster City (caretaker)
- * Club domestic league appearances and goals

Matthew David Blinkhorn (born 2 March 1985) is a retired footballer who is now Head of Academy Coaching for Blackpool.

== Career ==
=== Blackpool ===
Born in Blackpool, Lancashire, Blinkhorn started his career with hometown club Blackpool. He played as a substitute in the victorious 2004 Football League Trophy Final. On 22 November 2006 he was loaned to Bury, but Blackpool manager Simon Grayson included a 24-hour recall clause in the contract, which began 28 days into the loan period. The loan period was due to end on 22 February 2007, but Blackpool cut it short and he returned on 9 February.

=== Morecambe ===
He was loaned to Morecambe of the Conference National for a month on 2 March 2007. Blinkhorn made an immediate impact, scoring the first goal in a 2–0 victory over St Albans City. By the end of his loan stint he had scored eight goals in 12 games.

Blinkhorn joined Morecambe on a permanent basis on 28 June 2007, for a fee of tribunal-set fee of £15,000, plus 25% of any future transfer fee that Morecambe were to receive for him.

=== Sligo Rovers ===
He was released by Morecambe in May 2009, and joined League of Ireland Premier Division side Sligo Rovers two months later. He made his debut for Sligo as a substitute in a 3–0 home defeat against Cork City at the Showgrounds on 12 July and scored his first goal for the club two weeks later in a 2–0 win over St Patrick's Athletic at home.

After the signing of Shamrock Rovers striker Pádraig Amond in the pre-season of 2010, Blinkhorn had to be second choice for half of the season until Amond signed for F.C. Paços de Ferreira. On 25 September 2010, Blinkhorn scored the winner for Sligo in a 1–0 win against Monaghan United in the 2010 League of Ireland Cup Final. He had to sit out Sligo's penalty shoot-out win over Shamrock Rovers in the 2010 FAI Cup Final on 14 November through suspension, along with recently confirmed PFAI Player of the Year, Richie Ryan.

=== York City ===
Following the expiration of his Sligo contract, Blinkhorn returned to England after signing for Conference Premier side York City on a contract until the end of the 2011–12 season on 10 January 2012. He scored four minutes into his debut against Salisbury City in the FA Trophy second round on 14 January 2012, having entered as a 65th-minute substitute, with York's fifth goal in a 6–2 victory. His first and only league goal for York came with the winner in the sixth minute of stoppage time at home to Stockport County on 18 February 2012 after heading in Jamie Reed's bicycle kick. Having been uninvolved for York in their play-off games, which concluded with League Two promotion, Blinkhorn finished the season with two goals in 19 appearances for York. He was released on 3 July 2012.

=== Hyde ===
After trials with Barrow and Chester, Blinkhorn signed for Conference Premier side Hyde on 17 August 2012. He scored on his debut for the club later that day, putting Hyde into the lead in a 2–1 defeat at home to Luton Town. He finished the season with Hyde having scored seven goals in 30 games.

=== AFC Fylde ===
In April 2013, he joined AFC Fylde on loan. Scoring two goals in three games including the opening goal against Hednesford Town in the Northern Premier League Premier Division play-off semi-final. On 25 June 2013, Blinkhorn signed a permanent one-year deal with Fylde.

=== Lancaster City ===
Blinkhorn joined Lancaster City in June 2018.

=== Coaching ===
On 29 October 2015 while playing for AFC Fylde, Blinkhorn was appointed as the Lead Foundation Coach for the academy at Blackpool.

In August 2018, he became a youth development lead coach at Fleetwood Town.

Following the resignation of Lancaster manager Phil Brown on 10 September 2018, the club appointed Blinkhorn as caretaker manager together with Craig Stanley. They were in charge for 6 games.

Blinkhorn returned to Blackpool FC as the youth academy's Head of Coaching in 2020, returning as part of Ciaran Donnelly's staffing structure after spending 2 seasons at Fleetwood FC's youth academy.

== Career statistics ==
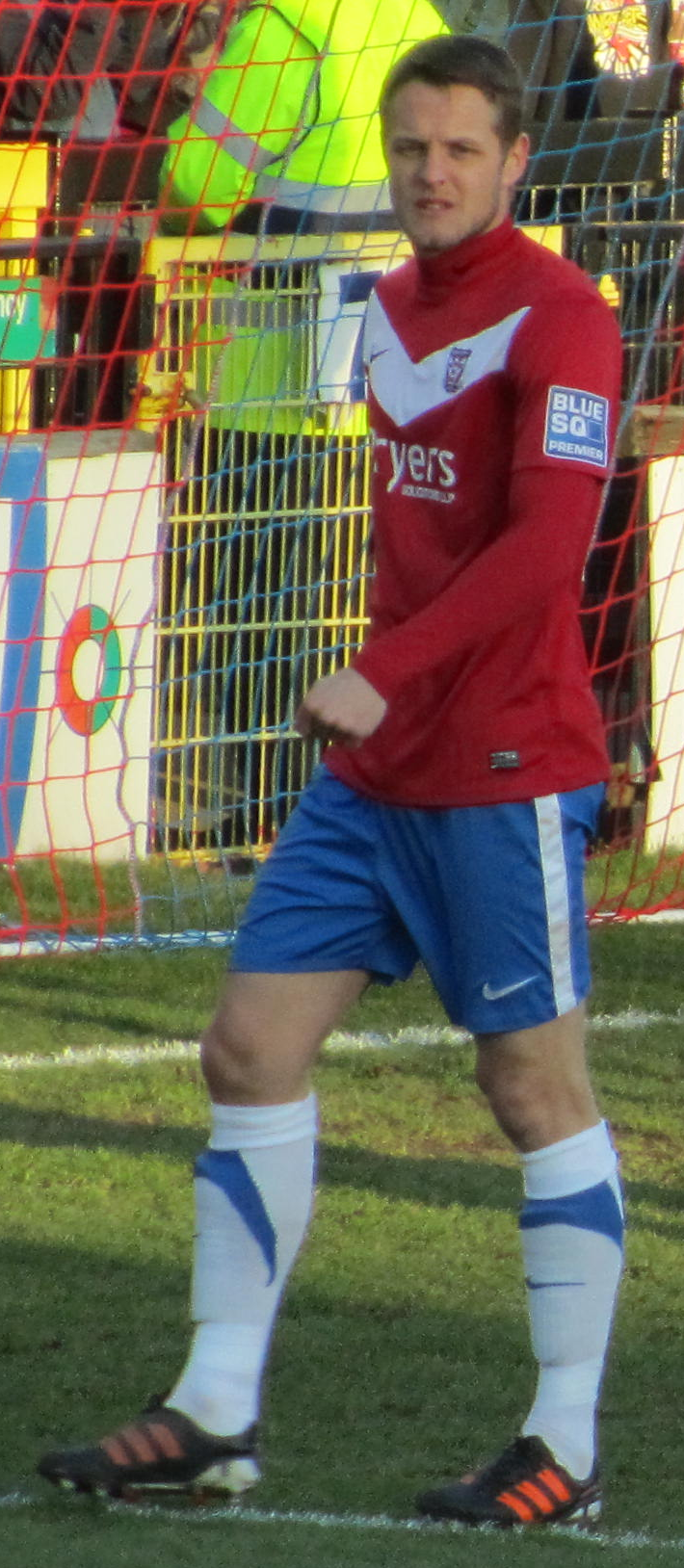
Blinkhorn playing for York City in 2012

As of match played 21 November 2017

Appearances and goals by club, season and competition
Club	Season	League			National Cup		League Cup		Other		Total	
Club	Season	Division	Apps	Goals	Apps	Goals	Apps	Goals	Apps	Goals	Apps	Goals
Blackpool	2001–02	Second Division	3	0	0	0	0	0	1 (Note: Appearances in Football League Trophy)	0	4	0
Blackpool	2002–03	Second Division	7	2	0	0	0	0	1	0	8	2
Blackpool	2003–04	Second Division	12	1	0	0	0	0	4	1	16	2
Blackpool	2004–05	League One	4	0	2	0	0	0	2	3	8	3
Blackpool	2005–06	League One	16	2	1	0	1	0	1	1	19	3
Blackpool	2006–07	League One	2	0	0	0	0	0	1	0	3	0
Blackpool	Total		44	5	3	0	1	0	10	5	58	10
Luton Town (loan)	2004–05	League One	2	0	0	0	1	0	0	0	3	0
Bury (loan)	2006–07	League Two	10	0	0	0	0	0	0	0	10	0
Morecambe (loan)	2006–07	Conference National	12	8	0	0	—		0	0	12	8
Morecambe	2007–08	League Two	41	10	1	0	2	0	5	1	49	11
Morecambe	2008–09	League Two	11	0	0	0	1	0	0	0	12	0
Morecambe	Total		64	18	1	0	3	0	5	1	73	19
Sligo Rovers	2009	LOI Premier Division	17	4	1	1	?	?	?	?	18	5
Sligo Rovers	2010	LOI Premier Division	26	6	2	0	?	?	?	?	28	6
Sligo Rovers	2011	LOI Premier Division	29	12	6	0	3	0	5 (Note: Three appearances in Setanta Sports Cup, two in UEFA Europa League.)	0	43	12
Sligo Rovers	Total		72	22	9	1	3	0	5	0	89	23
York City	2011–12	Conference Premier	15	1	0	0	—		4 (Note: Appearances in FA Trophy)	1	19	2
Hyde	2012–13	Conference Premier	30	7	0	0	—		2	0	32	7
AFC Fylde (loan)	2012–13	NPL Premier Division	3	2	0	0	—		0	0	3	2
AFC Fylde	2013–14	NPL Premier Division	?	?	?	?	—		?	?	?	?
AFC Fylde	2014–15	Conference North	18	0	0	0	—		1	0	19	0
AFC Fylde	2015–16	National League North	25	2	2	0	—		3	1	30	3
AFC Fylde	2016–17	National League North	22	3	0	0	—		2	0	24	3
AFC Fylde	2017–18	National League	7	0	0	0	—		0	0	7	0
AFC Fylde	Total		72	5	2	0	0	0	6	1	80	6
Career total			312	60	15	1	8	0	30	8	365	69

== Honours ==
Blackpool

- Football League Trophy: 2003–04

Sligo Rovers

- FAI Cup: 2010, 2011
- League of Ireland Cup: 2010
