= Neil Sorvel =

English footballer (born 1973)

Personal information
- Date of birth: 2 March 1973 (age 53)
- Place of birth: Whiston, England
- Height: 5 ft 10 in (1.78 m)
- Position: Midfielder

Youth career
- 1988–1991: Crewe Alexandra

Senior career*
| Years | Team | Apps | (Gls) |
| 1991–1992 | Crewe Alexandra | 9 | (0) |
| 1992–1999 | Macclesfield Town | 292 | (29) |
| 1999–2005 | Crewe Alexandra | 250 | (13) |
| 2005–2007 | Shrewsbury Town | 63 | (5) |
| 2007–2008 | Morecambe | 41 | (2) |
| 2008 | → Southport (loan) | 6 | (0) |
| 2008–2010 | Droylsden | 57 | (4) |
| 2010 | Hyde | 1 | (0) |
| 2010–2011 | Northwich Victoria | 32 | (0) |
| Total | | 751 | (53) |
- * Club domestic league appearances and goals

Neil Sorvel (born 2 March 1973) is an English retired footballer who played as a midfielder.

== Playing career ==
=== Crewe Alexandra and Macclesfield Town ===
He began his league career with Crewe Alexandra, after progressing through their famous youth academy. However, he only made a handful of league appearances, before being released by manager Dario Gradi.

He then joined Macclesfield Town, where he spent six years. In this period Macclesfield finished first in the Football Conference in 1995, but were denied promotion due to their stadium, which did not meet league standards. Promotions did come in 1997 and in 1998, as Macclesfield climbed to tier 3 of English football. Sorvel was instrumental to the success of Macc during this time as he was part of a formidable midfield. Relegation down to Division Three followed in 1999. Sorvel left on a free transfer in July 1999, having become a regular for the club over six seasons.

A return to Division One (subsequently named the Championship) Crewe Alexandra followed, where he played almost every game over six seasons.

=== Shrewsbury Town ===
Dropping down two levels to join Shrewsbury Town on a free transfer, he made his début for the club on 6 August 2005 in a 1–0 defeat at home to Rochdale. After being a first team regular for the 2005–06 season and the opening part of the 2006–07 season, Sorvel fell out of favour with Shrewsbury manager Gary Peters, and lost his place in the first team.

=== Morecambe ===
Sorvel accepted a free move to then-Conference club Morecambe in January 2007. Morecambe were promoted to Football League Two for the first time in their history at the end of that season.

Sorvel was loaned out to Southport in the 2007–08 season, before being released on 2 June 2008.

=== Hyde ===
After two seasons with Droylsden, he signed for Hyde in August 2010. He made his debut for Hyde in the opening Conference North fixture on 14 August 2010 in a 5–0 defeat to AFC Telford.

=== Northwich Victoria ===
In 2010, he signed for Northwich Victoria. He was working as a lecturer in Sport at the local Mid Cheshire College, while playing for Northwich, and continued to work there until moving to Altrincham.

== Coaching career ==
Following his retirement from playing, Sorvel joined Nantwich Town as assistant manager to Phil Parkinson in February 2015. In April 2017, Sorvel followed Nantwich manager Parkinson to new club Altrincham. On 4 May 2026 Sorvell once again followed Parkison to Chester FC.

== Honours ==
Crewe Alexandra

- Football League Second Division runner-up: 2002–03

Macclesfield Town

- Football Conference: 1994–95, 1996–97
- FA Trophy: 1995–96,
- Football League Third Division runner-up: 1997–98
