= Aaron Taylor (footballer) =

English footballer

Personal information
- Full name: Aaron Mark Taylor
- Date of birth: 9 March 1990 (age 36)
- Place of birth: Morecambe, England
- Position: Striker

Team information
- Current team: Witton Albion

Senior career*
Years	Team	Apps	(Gls)
2008–2010	Morecambe	20	(2)
2009	→ Barrow (loan)	5	(0)
2010	Kendal Town		
2010	Witton Albion		
2010	Bamber Bridge		
- * Club domestic league appearances and goals as of 15:48, 25 May 2010 (UTC)

Aaron Mark Taylor is an English professional football striker. He currently plays for Bamber Bridge F.C. having previously been at Morecambe.

Taylor was signed from the academy and made his debut as a sub in Morecambe's 2–2 draw with Chesterfield. He made his full debut against Rochdale on 18 October 2008 and marked his full debut with a goal. He regularly featured in Sammy McIlroys side.

He then went on to start the FA Cup game against Grimsby in the 1st round. He scored twice and was named man of the match to continue fulfilling his shown potential. He joined Barrow on a five-week loan at the start of the 2009/10 season before returning to Morecambe. He was released by Morecambe in May 2010.

He signed for Kendal Town, before switching to Witton Albion on 22 October 2010.

He quickly moved back to Lancashire to join Bamber Bridge on 26 November 2010. Aaron has also played for England youth.
