= Paul Lloyd (footballer) =

English footballer

Personal information
- Full name: Paul Laurence Lloyd
- Date of birth: 26 March 1987 (age 39)
- Place of birth: Preston, England
- Height: 5 ft 8 in (1.73 m)
- Position: Midfielder

Team information
- Current team: Bamber Bridge

Youth career
- 2003-2005: Morecambe

Senior career*
Years	Team	Apps	(Gls)
2005–2009	Morecambe	18	(3)
2007	→ Bamber Bridge (loan)	?	(?)
2009–2010	Forest Green Rovers	24	(1)
2009	→ Workington (loan)	0	(0)
2010–	Bamber Bridge	0	(0)
- * Club domestic league appearances and goals as of 16:35, 25 September 2009 (UTC)

Paul Laurence Lloyd (born 26 March 1987) is an English football midfielder who plays for Bamber Bridge.

== Career ==
Lloyd was part of the successful Morecambe academy side coached under the guidance of Dickie Danson and after a successful spell in Morecambe's reserve squad, Lloyd was promoted to the first team managed by Jim Harvey in the summer of 2005.

Lloyd joined Bamber Bridge on loan in January 2007 and when he returned from his loan spell he broke into the first team which saw him find the net past Cambridge United and Grays Athletic including a goal against his future employers Forest Green. Lloyd also featured in the Conference National play-off semi-final second leg against York City because of an injury to Garry Thompson.

Lloyd then signed a one-year contract upon Morecambe's promotion to the Football League, however, he did not make an appearance in the league in their first season. He was then offered another contract in the summer because of his potential ability.

Things didn't work out for Lloyd however in the 2008–09 season and he was released. He was then snapped up by his old manager, Jim Harvey, at Forest Green Rovers in February 2009. Lloyd made his Rovers debut coming off the bench in a 3–0 win over Northwich Victoria.

Despite only spending a short time at Forest Green he was offered a one-year contract in the summer of 2009 for the new season.

In early November Lloyd went on loan to Conference North side Workington for a month. Lloyd returned to Forest Green in January 2010. In February both Lloyd and Forest Green agreed to mutually terminate his contract.

In June 2010 Lloyd signed for Bamber Bridge.
