= Henry McStay =

Northern Irish footballer

Personal information
- Full name: Henry Matthew Patrick McStay
- Date of birth: 6 March 1985 (age 41)
- Place of birth: Armagh, Northern Ireland
- Position: Defender

Team information
- Current team: Leeds United (Head Physio)

Senior career*
Years	Team	Apps	(Gls)
2003–2005	Leeds United	0	(0)
2004	→ Halifax Town (loan)	5	(0)
2005	Halifax Town	3	(0)
2005–2007	Portadown	26	(2)
2007–2008	Royal Antwerp	0	(0)
2008–2010	Morecambe	34	(1)
2010–2011	Portadown	14	(0)
2011–2012	Bradford Park Avenue		
Total		82	(3)

International career
2004–2007	Republic of Ireland U21		
- * Club domestic league appearances and goals

Henry Matthew Patrick McStay (born 6 March 1985) is an Irish retired footballer who is the Head Physio at Leeds United.

His preferred position was right back, though towards the latter end of his career played in a more central defensive role. He is a former Republic of Ireland U21 international.

== Club career ==
Henry began his club career with Leeds United without ever breaking through in to the first team.

Henry went on loan to Halifax Town for a short period in search of first team football. His loan move ended in November 2004 after suffering a knee injury.

When his contract with Leeds ended, he joined Portadown in his native Northern Ireland, turning down offers from Aberdeen, Bohemians or Finn Harps.

After impressing for Portadown, Henry got the chance to move to Royal Antwerp. However, due to homesickness, McStay ended his contract with the Belgian club at the end of January 2008 and went in search of a new start in Britain.

In January 2008, Henry moved to Morecambe. In April, he signed a new two-year contract with Morecambe.

In June 2010, Henry moved to Portadown whom he previously played for signing a one-year contract. Due to personal commitments a move to Bradford Park Avenue arose where Henry spent just over a season before retiring due to a recurring knee injury.

== International career ==
Henry played international football for Northern Ireland's Under 17s before opting for the Republic of Ireland. A strong defender who played for the Republic's Under 19s and Under 21s, he is also an expert penalty taker.

He was one of the stars as Ireland won the European Youth Olympic Festival in Spain in 2001.

Henry made his Republic of Ireland Under 21 debut v Portugal U21s on 24 February 2004.

On 25 March 2005, in a 2006 UEFA European Under-21 Football Championship qualifying match against Israel U21, Henry conceded an own goal while trying to clear the ball in the sixth minute, deflecting the ball into the net. However, he redeemed himself by scoring a goal with a header via Willo Flood's free-kick in the 35th minute. However, Ireland U21 lost the match 3–1.

== Physio ==
After retiring he became a physio at Leeds United, where he worked several years as an Assistant Physio, before becoming Head Physio in the summer of 2018 after the departure of Steve Megson.

== Personal life ==
He studied at the University of Sheffield before completing his degree in physiotherapy at the University of Salford, following the part-time programme which has links with the Professional Footballers Association.
