= Stewart Drummond =

English footballer

Personal information
- Full name: Stewart James Drummond
- Date of birth: 11 December 1975 (age 50)
- Place of birth: Preston, England
- Height: 6 ft 2 in (1.88 m)
- Position: Midfielder

Senior career*
| Years | Team | Apps | (Gls) |
| 1994–2004 | Morecambe | 189 | (32) |
| 2004–2006 | Chester City | 87 | (12) |
| 2006–2008 | Shrewsbury Town | 67 | (7) |
| 2008–2015 | Morecambe | 277 | (34) |
| Total | | 620 | (85) |
- * Club domestic league appearances and goals

Stewart James Drummond (born 11 December 1975) is an English former footballer who last played for Morecambe.

A central midfielder, Drummond represented three clubs during a career spanning twenty-one years. He most notably spent a total of seventeen years at Morecambe, where he began playing in 1994 and retired in May 2015.

== Career ==
Signed by Chester City after a long spell with Morecambe in 2004, he went on to spend two years with the Blues and was named as the club's player of the year in 2005–06. He then opted to join Shrewsbury Town on the Bosman ruling on 12 May 2006. Drummond scored on his début for Town on the opening game of 2006–07, at home to Mansfield Town.

He scored his fifth goal of the season for Shrewsbury at Wembley in the 2007 Football League Two Play-off Final, in a 3–1 loss against Bristol Rovers. Being the first person to score in a play off final at the new Wembley Stadium.

Midway during the 2007/08 season, speculation linked Drummond with a move back to Morecambe, and in January 2008, it was announced that Morecambe had re-signed Drummond from Shrewsbury Town for a fee of £15,000 . Drummond is now the Academy Manager of Morecambe Football Club 2015 to date.

== Career statistics ==
Appearances and goals by club, season and competition
| Club | Season | Division | League | | FA Cup | | League Cup | | Other | | Total | |
| Club | Season | Division | Apps | Goals | Apps | Goals | Apps | Goals | Apps | Goals | Apps | Goals |
|---|---|---|---|---|---|---|---|---|---|---|---|---|
| Morecambe | 1997–98 | Conference | 1 | 1 | 2 | 0 | 0 | 0 | 0 | 0 | 3 | 1 |
| Morecambe | 1998–99 | Conference | 0 | 0 | 0 | 0 | 0 | 0 | 0 | 0 | 0 | 0 |
| Morecambe | 1999–2000 | Conference | 39 | 4 | 1 | 0 | 0 | 0 | 0 | 0 | 40 | 4 |
| Morecambe | 2000–01 | Conference | 40 | 7 | 3 | 0 | 0 | 0 | 3 (Note: 1 appearance and 1 goal in FA Trophy) (Note: 1 appearance in Football League Trophy) (Note: 1 appearance in Conference Trophy) | 1 | 46 | 8 |
| Morecambe | 2001–02 | Conference | 36 | 4 | 1 | 0 | 0 | 0 | 3 (Note: Appearance(s) in FA Trophy) | 1 | 40 | 5 |
| Morecambe | 2002–03 | Conference | 42 | 11 | 3 | 0 | 0 | 0 | 3 (Note: 1 appearance in FA Trophy) (Note: 2 appearance(s) in Conference play-offs) | 0 | 48 | 11 |
| Morecambe | 2003–04 | Conference | 31 | 5 | 0 | 0 | 0 | 0 | 0 | 0 | 31 | 5 |
| Total | | | 189 | 32 | 10 | 0 | 0 | 0 | 9 | 2 | 208 | 34 |
| Chester City | 2004–05 | League Two | 45 | 6 | 2 | 0 | 1 | 0 | 3 (Note: Appearance(s) in Football League Trophy) | 0 | 51 | 6 |
| Chester City | 2005–06 | League Two | 42 | 6 | 4 | 1 | 1 | 0 | 0 | 0 | 47 | 7 |
| Total | | | 87 | 12 | 6 | 1 | 2 | 0 | 3 | 0 | 98 | 13 |
| Shrewsbury Town | 2006–07 | League Two | 44 | 4 | 2 | 0 | 0 | 0 | 4 (Note: 3 appearances and 1 goal in League Two play-offs) | 1 | 50 | 5 |
| Shrewsbury Town | 2007–08 | League Two | 23 | 3 | 1 | 0 | 1 | 0 | 0 | 0 | 25 | 3 |
| Total | | | 67 | 7 | 3 | 0 | 1 | 0 | 4 | 1 | 75 | 8 |
| Morecambe | 2007–08 | League Two | 18 | 2 | 0 | 0 | 0 | 0 | 2 | 0 | 20 | 2 |
| Morecambe | 2008–09 | League Two | 44 | 10 | 2 | 0 | 1 | 0 | 3 | 1 | 50 | 11 |
| Morecambe | 2009–10 | League Two | 43 | 9 | 1 | 0 | 1 | 0 | 2 (Note: Appearance(s) in League Two play-offs) | 0 | 47 | 9 |
| Morecambe | 2010–11 | League Two | 41 | 6 | 1 | 0 | 1 | 0 | 1 | 0 | 44 | 6 |
| Morecambe | 2011–12 | League Two | 38 | 5 | 1 | 0 | 2 | 0 | 1 | 0 | 42 | 5 |
| Morecambe | 2012–13 | League Two | 44 | 2 | 3 | 0 | 1 | 0 | 2 | 0 | 50 | 2 |
| Morecambe | 2013–14 | League Two | 35 | 0 | 1 | 0 | 2 | 0 | 0 | 0 | 38 | 0 |
| Morecambe | 2014–15 | League Two | 14 | 0 | 0 | 0 | 0 | 0 | 1 | 0 | 15 | 0 |
| Total | | | 277 | 34 | 9 | 0 | 8 | 0 | 12 | 1 | 306 | 35 |
| Career total | | | 620 | 85 | 28 | 1 | 11 | 0 | 28 | 4 | 687 | 90 |

== Personal life ==
Drummond has three sons.

== Honours ==
Morecambe

- Conference League Cup: 1997–98
- Lancashire FA Challenge Trophy: 1995–96, 1998–99, 2003–04

Individual

- Football Conference Team of the Year: 2002–03
- Chester City Player of the Season: 2005–06
