= Danny Adams =

English footballer (born 1976)

Personal information
- Full name: Danny Norman Adams
- Date of birth: 3 January 1976 (age 50)
- Place of birth: Manchester, England
- Height: 5 ft 8 in (1.73 m)
- Position: Defender

Senior career*
Years	Team	Apps	(Gls)
1997–2000	Altrincham	40	(0)
2000–2004	Macclesfield Town	148	(1)
2004–2005	Stockport County	39	(1)
2005–2007	Huddersfield Town	70	(0)
2007–2010	Morecambe	117	(0)
2010	Stalybridge Celtic	1	(0)
2010	Nantwich Town		
- Witton Albion
Total		415	(2)
- * Club domestic league appearances and goals

Daniel Benjamin Adams (born 3 January 1976) is an English former professional footballer who played as a defender.

== Career ==
Adams turned professional in 1999 and played for clubs including Macclesfield Town, Stockport County and Huddersfield Town.

On 12 January 2007, the Huddersfield manager Peter Jackson told Adams along with two other teammates (Paweł Abbott and Martin McIntosh) that they were for sale. After telling this to the players, Peter Jackson told them to keep quiet about this but Adams thought that this was wrong and he told BBC Radio Leeds later that night. As a result of that Adams was then dropped from the first-team for the game against Cheltenham Town the next day and his contract was cancelled by mutual agreement on 23 January.

On 21 February 2007, Adams joined his former boss at Stockport, Sammy McIlroy, at then Conference side Morecambe on a deal until the end of the 2006–07 season. Following their promotion to League Two, Adams signed a two-year contract at the club. He was released in March 2010 and joined Conference North promotion hopefuls Stalybridge Celtic on 8 March. Adams joined Northern Premier League side Nantwich Town for the start of the 2010/11 season, moving on to Northern Premier League Division One North neighbours Witton Albion in December 2010. He has since retired as a footballer.

== Career statistics ==
Appearances and goals by club, season and competition
Club	Season	League			FA Cup		League Cup		Other		Total	
Club	Season	Division	Apps	Goals	Apps	Goals	Apps	Goals	Apps	Goals	Apps	Goals
Altrincham	1999–2000	Football Conference	40	0	0	0	0	0	2 (Note: 2 appearances in Conference Trophy)	0	42	0
Macclesfield Town	2000–01	Third Division	37	0	1	0	2	0	1 (Note: Appearance(s) in Football League Trophy)	0	41	0
Macclesfield Town	2001–02	Third Division	39	0	4	0	1	0	0	0	44	0
Macclesfield Town	2002–03	Third Division	45	1	3	0	2	0	1	0	51	1
Macclesfield Town	2003–04	Third Division	27	0	4	0	1	0	1	1	33	1
Macclesfield Town	Total		148	1	12	0	6	0	3	1	169	2
Stockport County	2003–04	Second Division	12	0	0	0	0	0	0	0	12	0
Stockport County	2004–05	League One	27	1	2	0	1	0	1	0	31	1
Stockport County	Total		39	1	2	0	1	0	1	0	43	1
Huddersfield Town	2004–05	League One	5	0	0	0	0	0	0	0	5	0
Huddersfield Town	2005–06	League One	42	0	3	0	2	0	0	0	47	0
Huddersfield Town	2006–07	League One	23	0	0	0	1	0	1	0	25	0
Huddersfield Town	Total		70	0	3	0	3	0	1	0	77	0
Morecambe	2006–07	Conference Premier	19	0	0	0	0	0	0	0	19	0
Morecambe	2007–08	League Two	42	0	1	0	3	0	4	0	50	0
Morecambe	2008–09	League Two	39	0	2	0	1	0	1	0	43	0
Morecambe	2009–10	League Two	17	0	1	0	1	0	0	0	19	0
Morecambe	Total		117	0	4	0	5	0	5	0	131	0
Stalybridge Celtic	2009–10	Conference North	1	0	-	-	-	-	-	-	1	0
Career total			415	2	21	0	15	0	12	1	463	3
