= Garry Hunter =

English footballer

Personal information
- Full name: Garry Paul Hunter
- Date of birth: 1 January 1985 (age 41)
- Place of birth: Morecambe, England
- Position: Midfielder

Youth career
- –2003: Morecambe

Senior career*
Years	Team	Apps	(Gls)
2003–2012	Morecambe	277	(11)
2012–2013	Barrow	39	(1)
2013–?	Lancaster City	?	(?)
- * Club domestic league appearances and goals as of 14:23, 8 August 2021 (UTC)

Garry Paul Hunter (born 1 January 1985) is an English former professional footballer. The majority of Hunter's career was spent with Morecambe, with whom he played over 300 times in all competitions. He also had a season at Barrow.

Hunter spent the first nine years of his career with Morecambe after joining from the club's academy, making his Conference debut on 23 August 2003 when he was a second-half substitute for Garry Thompson in Morecambe's 3–2 win at home to Dagenham & Redbridge. He was a member of the Morecambe side that won promotion to the Football League in 2007, playing as a substitute in the play-off final victory over Exeter City.

Hunter remained with Morecambe as they entered the Football League and made his league debut on 11 August 2007 in the goalless draw at home to Barnet.
