= Craig Stanley (footballer) =

English footballer

Personal information
- Date of birth: 3 March 1983 (age 43)
- Place of birth: Nuneaton, Warwickshire, England
- Height: 1.73 m (5 ft 8 in)
- Positions: Midfielder; centre-back

Team information
- Current team: Frimley Green

Senior career*
Years	Team	Apps	(Gls)
2002–2004	Walsall	0	(0)
2003–2004	→ Raith Rovers (loan)	19	(1)
2004	AFC Telford United	12	(1)
2004–2006	Hereford United	81	(4)
2006–2011	Morecambe	174	(15)
2011	→ Torquay United (loan)	19	(1)
2011–2012	Bristol Rovers	34	(1)
2012–2014	Aldershot Town	51	(2)
2014–2015	Eastleigh	32	(5)
2015–2017	Lincoln City	29	(2)
2016–2017	→ Southport (loan)	5	(0)
2017–2018	Barwell	?	(?)
2018–2019	Lancaster City	27	(0)
2019	Kettering Town	21	(2)
2019	Clitheroe	7	(1)
2019	Nuneaton Borough	6	(0)
2020–2021	Lymington Town	27	(1)
2021–2022	Hythe & Dibden	18	(0)
2022	Shaftesbury	8	(0)
2022–2023	Blackfield & Langley	13	(0)
2023	Hythe & Dibden	7	(0)
2023	Brockenhurst	6	(0)
2023–2024	Bashley	9	(0)
2024–2025	Bournemouth FC	28	(1)
2024	→ Downton (loan)	2	(0)
2025–	Frimley Green	0	(0)

International career
2005–2007	England C	4	(0)

Managerial career
- 2018: Lancaster City (caretaker)
- 2022: Totton & Eling
- 2022–2023: Blackfield & Langley
- * Club domestic league appearances and goals as of 13:37, 22 May 2025 (UTC)

Craig Stanley (born 3 March 1983) is an English footballer who plays as centre-back for Wessex League Division One club Frimley Green.

== Career ==
Stanley began his career with Walsall. He was a key member of the Hereford side that clinched promotion to the Football League after play-off victories over the Shrimps and Halifax Town in the 2005–06 season.

Stanley signed for Morecambe in 2006 and won another consecutive promotion to the Football league. After several successful seasons, he left Morecambe in 2011, as he fell out with manager Sammy McIlroy.

Stanley captained the England National XI to a 4–1 victory over the Netherlands on 29 November 2006, winning the European Challenge Trophy.

On 31 January 2011, Stanley signed a one-month loan deal for Torquay United. After an impressive stint with Torquay, the loan was extended until the end of the season.

Stanley signed for Bristol Rovers on a two-year contract on 7 June 2011. In July 2012, he had his contract terminated by mutual consent.

He has been announced as the captain of Aldershot Town for the 2013–2014 season. He left the club at the end of the season after failing to agree a new contract. On 15 June 2018 Stanley signed for Lancaster City. Following the resignation of Lancaster manager Phil Brown on 10 September 2018, the club appointed Craig Stanley as caretaker manager together with Matthew Blinkhorn. After a six-game spell in charge Stanley lost out on the job on a permanent basis and on 8 January 2019, Stanley joined Kettering Town. Six months later, he joined Clitheroe.

In September 2019, Stanley joined Nuneaton Borough. On 3 November 2019 the club confirmed, that Stanley had left the club again because the traveling time from his home to the club, was too long.

In November 2021, Stanley joined Wessex League Premier Division club Hythe & Dibden, helping to captain the side to survival with a 3–0 victory over Cowes Sports which saw the side reprieved from relegation.

In March 2023, after quitting managerial duties at Blackfield & Langley, he returned to former club Hythe & Dibden as a player.

In August 2023, he joined Brockenhurst as a player-coach. In September 2023, he joined Bashley, again as a player-coach.

In July 2024, Stanley signed for Wessex League Premier Division side Bournemouth FC. In November 2024, he joined league rivals Downton.

In November 2025, Stanley returned to playing, joining Wessex League Division One club Frimley Green.

== Coaching career ==
In June 2022, Stanley was appointed manager of Wessex League Division One club Totton & Eling. Stanley resigned from his role on 3 August without having managed a competitive fixture. In November 2022, he took over as manager of Blackfield & Langley and was also registered as a player. On 1 March 2023, he resigned from his role as manager.

In May 2025, Stanley joined Southern League Division One South side Winchester City as first-team coach. He departed the club in October 2025.

== Personal life ==
Stanley has type 1 diabetes.

== Honours ==
- Football Conference Play-Off Winner 2006, 2007
