= Wayne Curtis =

English footballer

Personal information
- Full name: Wayne John Curtis
- Date of birth: 6 March 1980 (age 46)
- Place of birth: Barrow-in-Furness, England
- Position: Striker

Youth career
- Holker Old Boys

Senior career*
Years	Team	Apps	(Gls)
1994–1998	Holker Old Boys	111	(74)
1998–2010	Morecambe	304	(116)
2003–2004	→ Barrow (loan)	9	(3)
2009	→ Barrow (loan)	2	(0)
2010–2011	Fleetwood Town	20	(3)
2011	→ Barrow (loan)	13	(1)
2011	Kendal Town	5	(1)
Total		464	(163)
- * Club domestic league appearances and goals

Wayne John Curtis (born 6 March 1980) is an English retired football striker. He finished his career after a short spell with Kendal Town in September and October 2011. He has played in the football league for Morecambe as well as non-league football for Fleetwood Town, Barrow, Kendal Town and Holker Old Boys where he began his career in 1994.

== Career ==
Born in Barrow-in-Furness, Curtis began his career with Holker Old Boys, and was signed by Jim Harvey in 1998 for Morecambe. His Morecambe debut came against Dover Athletic on 25 April 1998.

After a period of indifferent form, he went on loan to his home town club Barrow for a spell during the 2003–2004 season. Upon his return, he hit a rich vein of form and has rarely been out of the first team since. His form after his return from loan saw him attract the attention of Football League club Rochdale who had two bids for him turned down.

He was awarded the [Morecambe] Visitor newspaper Player of the Season award at the end of the 2004/5 season for receiving the highest average rating of all Morecambe players during the course of the season.

More recently he has been playing on the left wing rather than his natural striker position. Following injuries, he attracted the attention once again of Barrow whom he joined on a month's loan on 1 January 2009. The loan was not extended due to financial difficulties and a resulting transfer embargo at Morecambe. He was released at the end of his contract in May 2010.

Also, Wayne has a record of being the first player to miss a penalty at the New Wembley.

On 29 July 2010 Wayne Curtis signed for newly promoted Conference National side Fleetwood Town.

On 31 January 2011, Curtis joined Barrow on loan until the end of the season.

In September 2011 Curtis signed for Northern Premier League Premier Division club Kendal Town on a non-contract basis but was short lived and left the club in mid-October 2011. Curtis is who plays for Holker Old Boys in the North-West Counties Football League Division 1 on a non-contract basis.

== Honours ==
Morecambe

- Conference National play-offs: 2007

Individual

- Football Conference Goalscorer of the Month: August 2002
