= Christie Park (Morecambe) =

Former stadium in Lancashire, England

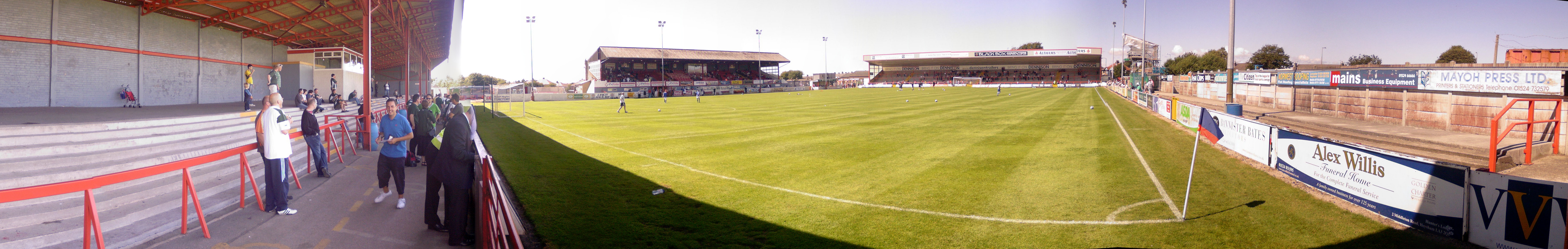

- Former location in Morecambe
- Former names: Rosebery Park (1921–1928)
- Location: Lancaster Road, Morecambe
- Coordinates: 54.0675°N 2.8471°W
- Elevation: 8 metres (26 ft)
- Owner: Morecambe
- Capacity: c. 6,400 (1,200 seated)
- Type: Stadium
- Surface: Grass
- Scoreboard: Manually operated in front of the eastern Car Wash terrace
- Record attendance: 9,383 (6 January 1962 v Weymouth, FA Cup 3rd Round)
- Public transit: Bare Lane

Construction
- Opened: 1921
- Closed: 2010
- Demolished: 2010

Tenants
- Morecambe (1921–2010); Carlisle United (2005)

Christie Park was the home of Morecambe FC, located on the corner of Christie Avenue and Lancaster Road in Morecambe, Lancashire, England.

Christie Park had a capacity of approximately 6,400. It comprised three covered stands and one uncovered stand. The only seated stand (the Main Stand) ran along the length of the pitch on one side. The main terraced end (the North Stand) was situated behind one of the goals, and was the location for the majority of the home fans on match days. The other covered stand (the Umbro Stand) was opposite the North Stand and was where away fans were placed during segregated matches. The capacity in this stand could be increased using temporary terracing, such as when Carlisle United visited on Boxing Day, 2004.

Carlisle United played their home matches at Christie Park for six weeks in 2005 during repair work following flooding at their Brunton Park ground.

The uncovered stand (the Carwash Terrace) took its name from the car wash directly behind it on Lancaster Road. The supporters' club building that used to be behind it was knocked down late in 2006 and the club then received planning permission to build a new stand on its site comprising sponsors' facilities, conference rooms and offices.

On 17 July 2007, however, Morecambe announced plans to move to a new stadium in time for the start of the 2010–11 season.

The final ever goal at Christie Park was scored by David Artell.

Within days of the end of the 2009–10 season, demolition of the stadium commenced and site clearance began. By mid August 2010 the superstructure of a new Sainsbury's supermarket occupied the spot where the stadium once stood. With Morecambe F.C. now installed at their new ground, the Globe Arena off Westgate in Morecambe, Sainsbury's opened their new supermarket in late 2010.
