= List of Morecambe F.C. seasons =

Morecambe Football Club is an English football club based in Morecambe, Lancashire. It plays its football in National League, the fifth tier of English football, having been promoted in 2007 for the first time in their history to the Football League, and again in 2021.

In 2023, they were relegated, for the first time in their history, back to League Two. At the time, they were the last of the 92 Premier League and Football League clubs to suffer a relegation.

== History ==
Football in the town dates back to the turn of the 20th century; however, it was not until 7 May 1920 that Morecambe FC was formed after a meeting at the local West View Hotel. The club then took its place in the Lancashire Combination League for the 1920–21 season. At the end of the first season the club moved grounds to Roseberry Park. A few years later after the purchase of the ground by the then-President, Mr. J.B. Christie, the ground's name was changed to Christie Park, in his honour. Those early seasons proved difficult and it was not until 1924–25 that the club began to enjoy some success, claiming the league title for the first time; this was later followed by success in the Lancashire Junior Cup, beating old rivals Chorley after two replays, and in front of over 30,000 spectators.

Mr. Christie bequeathed the ground to the club in 1927 and also helped incorporate the club into a Limited Company with a then share capital of £1,000. The rest of the 1920s and the whole of the 1930s saw a constant struggle to keep football alive on the North West coast, with poor results on the field and little or no revenue off the field, a near certain recipe for disaster.

The post-war era saw an upturn in the Shrimps' fortunes with steady progress throughout the late 1940s and nearly all the 1950s. These years included an FA Cup third round appearance in 1961–62, a 1–0 defeat to Weymouth; a Lancashire Senior Cup Final victory in 1968, a 2–1 win over Burnley and an FA Trophy success at Wembley in 1974, a 2–1 win over Dartford in the final.

The next decade were as barren as any previous period in the club's history, with the Grim Reaper never far from the Christie Park door. Attendances fell from a creditable 2,000 plus to a miserable 200 minus, with a visible decline in the club fortunes during that period. However, in 1985–86, signs of improvement appeared: the club's league position improved and cup success over the next few years filled the club with optimism.

It took ten years of improvement both on and off the field to reach the club's ambition of promotion to the Football Conference after many further improvements, not only to the ground but also regarding the club's structure, giving the club the opportunity to look forward as one of the more progressive Conference clubs.

Since elevation to the Conference in season 1995–96, the Shrimps achieved status as one of the leading teams in the league. In fact, only Woking had a longer unbroken membership of the league at this time. Runners-up spot was claimed on one occasion and the play-offs places were narrowly missed twice. Also during this time, the club also equalled its best appearance in the FA Cup in both 2000–01 and 2002–03. On both occasions the club faced Ipswich Town, losing 3–0 and 4–0 respectively. Morecambe also defeated a few league clubs in the FA Cup, including Cambridge United in 2000–01 and Chesterfield in 2002–03.

Morecambe were promoted to the Football League for the first time in their history after winning the Conference Playoff Final, beating Exeter City 2–1 at Wembley on 20 May 2007, in front of over 40,000 fans which followed their semi-final victory over York City.

On 17 July 2007, Morecambe announced plans to move to a new stadium in time for the start of the 2009–10 season. Work did not commence on the proposed site until spring 2009 with an anticipated completion date of summer 2010.

Morecambe played their first game in the Football League against Barnet at Christie Park in August 2007, in which they played out a 0–0 draw to secure their first ever Football League point.

2009–10 was Morecambe's last season at Christie Park. They finished the season in fourth place, qualifying for the playoffs, where they lost 7–2 on aggregate to Dagenham & Redbridge. On 10 August 2010, Morecambe played their first match at the Globe Arena against Championship side Coventry City in the League Cup first round. Morecambe secured a 2–0 win, with Andy Fleming scoring the first two goals at the stadium. This earned Morecambe a Lancashire Derby in the second round against another Championship side, Burnley, where they lost 3–1.

== Key ==
Key to league record

- Level = Level of the league in the current league system
- Pld = Games played
- W = Games won
- D = Games drawn
- L = Games lost
- GF = Goals for
- GA = Goals against
- GD = Goals difference
- Pts = Points
- Position = Position in the final league table
- Top scorer and number of goals scored shown in bold when he was also top scorer for the division.

Key to cup records

- Res = Final reached round
- Rec = Final club record in the form of wins-draws-losses
- PR = Preliminary round
- QR1 (2, etc.) = Qualifying Cup rounds
- G = Group stage
- R1 (2, etc.) = Proper Cup rounds
- QF = Quarter-finalists
- SF = Semi-finalists
- F = Finalists
- A (QF, SF, F) = Area quarter-, semi-, finalists
- W = Winners

== Seasons ==
Year	League	Lvl	Pld	W	D	L	GF	GA	GD	Pts	Position	Leading league scorer		FA Cup		EFL Cup FA Trophy		EFL Trophy		Average home attendance (Note: Average home attendance = for league games only)
Year	League	Lvl	Pld	W	D	L	GF	GA	GD	Pts	Position	Name	Goals	Res	Rec	Res	Rec	Res	Rec	Average home attendance
1920–21	**Lancashire Combination**		34	10	5	19	58	83	-25	25	**13th of 18**			PR	0-1-1					
1921–22	**Lancashire Combination**		34	10	6	18	36	56	-20	26	**14th of 18**			PR	0-1-1					
1922–23	**Lancashire Combination**		34	9	8	17	41	60	-19	26	**15th of 18**			QR3	3-1-1					
1923–24	**Lancashire Combination**		38	15	5	18	60	63	-3	35	**15th of 20**			QR3	3-1-1					
1924–25	**Lancashire Combination**		36	24	7	5	88	31	+57	55	**1st of 19**			QR1	1-0-1					
1925–26	**Lancashire Combination**		38	21	10	7	103	58	+45	52	**2nd of 20**			QR1	2-1-1					
1926–27	**Lancashire Combination**		38	23	4	11	105	58	+47	50	**3rd of 20**			QR1	1-0-1					
1927–28	**Lancashire Combination**		38	17	6	15	92	72	+20	40	**8th of 20**			QR1	1-0-1					
1928–29	**Lancashire Combination**		38	20	2	16	89	73	+16	42	**10th of 20**			QR3	3-0-1					
1929–30	**Lancashire Combination**		38	12	7	19	74	111	-37	31	**14th of 20**			PR	0-0-1					
1930–31	**Lancashire Combination**		38	12	8	18	76	97	-21	32	**16th of 20**									
1931–32	**Lancashire Combination**		36	6	6	24	41	93	-52	18	**18th of 19**			PR	0-0-1					
1932–33	**Lancashire Combination**		38	11	10	17	68	84	-26	32	**14th of 20**			QR3	2-1-1					
1933–34	**Lancashire Combination**		38	9	9	20	65	101	-36	27	**18th of 20**			QR1	0-0-1					
1934–35	**Lancashire Combination**		38	17	5	16	63	60	+3	39	**8th of 20**			QR2	2-0-1					
1935–36	**Lancashire Combination**		40	19	9	12	78	65	+13	47	**6th of 21**			QR1	0-0-1					
1936–37	**Lancashire Combination**		40	17	10	13	95	75	+20	44	**10th of 21**			R1	5-2-1					
1937–38	**Lancashire Combination**		42	21	10	11	90	70	+20	52	**6th of 22**			QR1	0-1-1					
1938–39	**Lancashire Combination**		42	14	10	18	67	76	-9	38	**15th of 22**			QR1	1-0-1					
No competitive football was played between 1939 and 1945 due to World War II.
1945–46	**Lancashire Combination**		22	6	6	10	54	68	-14	18	**9th of 12**									
1946–47	**Lancashire Combination**		42	23	5	14	133	85	+48	51	**4th of 22**			QR1	1-0-1					
1947–48	**Lancashire Combination**		42	24	6	12	98	59	+39	54	**4th of 22**			QR2	2-0-1					
1948–49	**Lancashire Combination**		42	22	6	14	80	60	+20	50	**3rd of 22**			PR	0-0-1					
1949–50	**Lancashire Combination**		42	17	11	14	62	55	+7	45	**9th of 22**			PR	0-0-1					
1950–51	**Lancashire Combination**		42	12	12	18	56	73	-17	36	**15th of 22**			PR	0-0-1					
1951–52	**Lancashire Combination**		42	21	7	14	74	72	+2	49	**5th of 22**			QR1	0-1-1					
1952–53	**Lancashire Combination**		42	16	9	17	60	61	-1	41	**11th of 22**			QR3	2-0-1					
1953–54	**Lancashire Combination**		40	14	6	20	58	83	-25	34	**19th of 21**			QR3	2-0-1					
1954–55	**Lancashire Combination**		42	18	8	16	68	65	+3	44	**9th of 22**			QR1	0-1-1					
1955–56	**Lancashire Combination**		38	12	5	21	62	94	-32	29	**17th of 20**			QR1	0-0-1					
1956–57	**Lancashire Combination**		38	20	7	11	81	53	+28	47	**3rd of 20**			R1	0-0-0					
1957–58	**Lancashire Combination**		42	18	12	12	66	50	+16	48	**7th of 22**			QR4	3-0-1					
1958–59	**Lancashire Combination**		42	22	9	11	77	44	+33	53	**5th of 22**			R1	4-0-1					
1959–60	**Lancashire Combination**		42	28	2	12	103	54	+49	58	**4th of 22**			QR1	0-0-1					
1960–61	**Lancashire Combination**		42	23	5	14	96	76	+20	51	**6th of 22**			QR3	2-1-1					
1961–62	**Lancashire Combination**		42	32	6	4	143	51	+92	70	**1st of 22**			R3	6-0-1					
1962–63	**Lancashire Combination**		42	31	6	5	153	40	+113	68	**1st of 22**			R1	1-0-1					
1963–64	**Lancashire Combination**		42	19	8	15	93	71	+22	46	**10th of 22**			QR4	0-0-1					
1964–65	**Lancashire Combination**		42	30	2	10	132	50	+82	62	**3rd of 22**			QR3	2-0-1					
1965–66	**Lancashire Combination**		42	19	12	11	105	65	+50	50	**7th of 22**			QR2	1-0-1					
1966–67	**Lancashire Combination**		41	30	9	2	90	24	+66	69	**1st of 22**			R1	4-3-1					
1967–68	**Lancashire Combination**		42	28	9	5	112	41	+71	65	**1st of 22**			QR4	0-0-1					
Northern Premier League created. Club transferred to the newly created league.
1968–69	**Northern**; **Premier**; **League**	5	38	16	14	8	64	37	+27	46	**3rd of 20**			R2	5-0-1					
1969–70	**Northern**; **Premier**; **League**	5	38	10	13	15	41	51	-10	33	**15th of 20**			QR4	0-0-1	R1	0-0-1			
1970–71	**Northern**; **Premier**; **League**	5	42	11	11	17	67	79	-12	39	**12th of 22**			QR1	0-0-1	QR3	0-0-1			
1971–72	**Northern**; **Premier**; **League**	5	46	15	10	21	51	64	-13	40	**17th of 24**			QR2	1-1-1	R3	5-0-1			
1972–73	**Northern**; **Premier**; **League**	5	46	17	11	18	62	70	-8	45	**15th of 24**			QR1	0-0-1	QF	4-3-1			
1973–74	**Northern**; **Premier**; **League**	5	46	13	13	20	62	84	-22	39	**17th of 24**			QR1	0-1-1	W	7-1-0			
1974–75	**Northern**; **Premier**; **League**	5	46	14	15	17	71	87	-16	43	**13th of 24**			R1	0-0-1	R2	1-0-1			
1975–76	**Northern**; **Premier**; **League**	5	46	11	11	24	47	67	-20	33	**20th of 24**			R1	1-1-1	R3	2-1-1			
1976–77	**Northern**; **Premier**; **League**	5	44	13	11	20	59	75	-16	37	**15th of 23**			R1	1-0-1	QF	3-2-1			
1977–78	**Northern**; **Premier**; **League**	5	46	11	11	24	67	92	-25	33	**21st of 24**			QR4	0-1-1	R1	0-0-1			
1978–79	**Northern**; **Premier**; **League**	5	44	11	13	20	55	65	-10	35	**18th of 23**			R1	1-0-1	R1	0-0-1			
1978–79	**Northern**; **Premier**; **League**	5	Level of the league decreased after the Alliance Premier League creation.											R1	1-0-1	R1	0-0-1			
1979–80	**Northern**; **Premier**; **League**	6	42	10	12	20	40	59	-19	32	**17th of 22**			R1	1-1-1	R2	2-0-1			
1980–81	**Northern**; **Premier**; **League**	6	42	11	8	23	42	74	-32	30	**21st of 22**			QR4	0-0-1	R1	1-1-1			
1981–82	**Northern**; **Premier**; **League**	6	42	9	11	22	43	86	-43	29	**20th of 22**			QR1	0-0-1	QR3	0-0-1			
1982–83	**Northern**; **Premier**; **League**	6	42	16	11	15	75	66	+9	59	**13th of 22**			QR3	3-1-1	QR3	0-0-1			
1983–84	**Northern**; **Premier**; **League**	6	42	11	12	19	59	75	-16	45	**19th of 22**			QR2	1-1-1	QR2	1-2-1			
1984–85	**Northern**; **Premier**; **League**	6	42	11	14	17	51	67	-16	47	**18th of 22**			QR1	0-0-1	R1	3-0-1			
1985–86	**Northern**; **Premier**; **League**	6	42	17	17	8	59	39	+20	68	**3rd of 22**			R1	4-2-1	R1	4-1-1			
1986–87	**Northern**; **Premier**; **League**	6	42	20	12	10	66	49	+17	72	**6th of 22**			QR3	2-0-1	R1	1-0-1			
1987–88	**Northern**; **Premier**; **League**	6	42	19	15	8	61	41	+20	72	**4th of 22**			QR1	0-0-1	QR3	0-0-1			
1988–89	**Northern**; **Premier**; **League**	6	42	13	9	20	55	60	-5	47	**16th of 22**			QR3	2-2-1	QR3	0-1-1			
1989–90	**Northern**; **Premier**; **League**	6	42	15	9	18	58	70	-12	54	**15th of 22**			QR1	0-0-1	QR1	0-0-1			
1990–91	**Northern**; **Premier**; **League**	6	40	19	16	5	72	44	+28	73	**3rd of 21**			QR1	0-1-1	QR3	2-0-1			
1991–92	**Northern**; **Premier**; **League**	6	42	21	13	8	70	44	+26	76	**3rd of 22**			R1	4-0-1	R3	3-2-1			
1992–93	**Northern**; **Premier**; **League**	6	42	25	11	6	93	51	+42	86	**3rd of 22**			QR1	0-0-1	R2	2-2-1			
1993–94	**Northern**; **Premier**; **League**	6	42	20	7	15	90	56	+34	67	**7th of 22**			QR4	3-0-1	QF	3-0-1			
1994–95	**Northern**; **Premier**; **League**	6	42	28	10	4	99	34	+65	94	**2nd of 22**			QR4	3-0-1	R3	2-0-1			
1994–95	**Northern**; **Premier**; **League**	6	**Promoted.** (Note: Finished four points behind Marine, however Marine were not promoted due to ground grading standards.)											QR4	3-0-1	R3	2-0-1			
1995–96	**National**; **League** (Note: During Morecambe's tenure, the league was known as the Football Conference, until the 2004–05 season when it was renamed to Conference National following the creation of Conference North and Conference South.)	5	42	17	8	17	78	72	+6	59	**9th of 22**			QR4	3-0-1	R1	0-1-1			1,130
1996–97	**National**; **League**	5	42	19	9	14	69	56	+13	66	**4th of 22**			R1	4-2-1	R3	2-1-1			1,010
1997–98	**National**; **League**	5	42	21	10	11	77	64	+13	73	**5th of 22**			R1	1-2-0	R2	1-0-1			1,532
1998–99	**National**; **League**	5	42	15	8	19	60	76	-16	53	**14th of 22**			QR4	1-0-1	R2	0-0-1			1,163
1999–2000	**National**; **League**	5	42	18	16	8	70	48	+22	70	**3rd of 22**	**Justin Jackson**	**29**	R1	1-0-1	R3	1-0-1			1,493
2000–01	**National**; **League**	5	42	11	12	19	64	66	-2	45	**19th of 22**	Phil Eastwood; John Norman	10	R3	3-0-1	R5	2-4-0	R1	0-0-1	1,243
2001–02	**National**; **League**	5	42	17	11	14	63	67	-4	62	**6th of 22**	Robbie Talbot	15	R1	1-0-1	SF	4-1-2			1,289
2002–03	**National**; **League**	5	42	23	9	10	86	42	+44	78	**2nd of 22**	Wayne Curtis	18	R3	3-0-1	R4	1-0-1	R1	0-0-1	p
2002–03	**National**; **League**	5	Lost in the **play-off** semi-finals.									Wayne Curtis	18	R3	3-0-1	R4	1-0-1	R1	0-0-1	p
2003–04	**National**; **League**	5	42	20	7	15	66	66	0	67	**7th of 22**	Danny Carlton	17	QR4	0-0-1	R3	0-0-1	R1	0-0-1	1,781
2004–05	**National**; **League**	5	42	19	14	9	69	50	+19	71	**7th of 22**	Michael Twiss	22	R1	1-0-1	R5	2-0-1	R1	0-0-1	1,751
2005–06	**National**; **League**	5	42	22	8	12	68	41	+27	74	**5th of 22**	Danny Carlton	17	R1	1-0-1	R2	1-0-1	R2	0-1-1	1,780
2005–06	**National**; **League**	5	Lost in the **play-off** semi-finals.									Danny Carlton	17	R1	1-0-1	R2	1-0-1	R2	0-1-1	1,780
2006–07	**National**; **League**	5	46	23	12	11	64	46	+18	81	**3rd of 24**	Garry Thompson	11	R2	2-0-1	R3	2-1-1			1,598
2006–07	**National**; **League**	5	Promoted after winning the **Play-off Final**.									Garry Thompson	11	R2	2-0-1	R3	2-1-1			1,598
2007–08	**EFL**; **League Two**	4	46	16	12	18	59	63	-4	60	**11th of 24**	Carl Baker; Matthew Blinkhorn	10	R1	0-0-1	R3	2-0-1	AF	2-3-1	2,812
2008–09	**EFL**; **League Two**	4	46	15	18	13	53	56	-3	63	**11th of 24**	Stewart Drummond; Rene Howe	10	R2	1-0-1	R1	0-0-1	AQF	0-2-1	2,153
2009–10	**EFL**; **League Two**	4	46	20	13	13	73	64	+9	73	**4th of 24**	Phil Jevons	18	R1	0-1-1	R1	0-0-1	R1	0-1-0	2,262
2009–10	**EFL**; **League Two**	4	Lost in the **play-off** semi-finals.									Phil Jevons	18	R1	0-1-1	R1	0-0-1	R1	0-1-0	2,262
2010–11	**EFL**; **League Two**	4	46	13	12	21	54	73	-19	51	**20th of 24**	Phil Jevons; Jimmy Spencer	8	R1	0-0-1	R2	1-0-1	R1	0-0-1	2,648
2011–12	**EFL**; **League Two**	4	46	14	14	18	63	57	+6	56	**15th of 24**	Kevin Ellison	15	R1	0-0-1	R2	1-0-1	R2	0-1-0	2,144
2012–13	**EFL**; **League Two**	4	46	15	13	18	55	61	-6	58	**16th of 24**	Jack Redshaw	15	R2	1-1-1	R2	1-0-1	R2	1-0-1	1,954
2013–14	**EFL**; **League Two**	4	46	13	15	18	52	64	-12	54	**18th of 24**	Pádraig Amond	11	R1	0-0-1	R2	1-0-1	R2	0-1-0	1,939
2014–15	**EFL**; **League Two**	4	46	17	12	17	53	52	+1	63	**11th of 24**	Kevin Ellison; Jack Redshaw	11	R1	0-0-1	R1	0-0-1	R2	1-0-1	1,998
2015–16	**EFL**; **League Two**	4	46	12	10	24	69	91	-22	46	**21st of 24**	Shaun Miller	15	R1	0-1-1	R1	0-0-1	ASF	3-0-1	1,572
2016–17	**EFL**; **League Two**	4	46	14	10	22	53	73	-20	52	**18th of 24**	Kevin Ellison; Paul Mullin	8	R1	0-1-1	R2	1-0-1	R2	1-2-1	1,704
2017–18	**EFL**; **League Two**	4	46	9	19	18	41	56	-15	46	**22nd of 24**	Callum Lang	10	R2	1-0-1	R1	0-0-1	GS	0-1-2	1,492
2018–19	**EFL**; **League Two**	4	46	14	12	20	54	70	-16	54	**18th of 24**	Aaron Collins	8	R1	0-1-1	R1	0-0-1	GS	0-0-3	2,033
2019–20	**EFL**; **League Two**	4	37	7	11	19	35	60	-25	32	**22nd of 24**	Cole Stockton; Lewis Alessandra	5	R1	0-0-1	R2	1-0-1	GS	1-1-1	2,264
2020–21	**EFL**; **League Two**	4	46	23	9	14	69	58	+11	78	**4th of 24**	Carlos Mendes Gomes	15	R3	2-0-1	R3	1-1-1	GS	1-0-2	0 (Note: Entire regular season played behind closed doors due to the COVID-19 pandemic, however approximately 1,500 did attend the home leg of the Play-off semi-final.)
2020–21	**EFL**; **League Two**	4	Promoted after winning the **Play-off Final**.									Carlos Mendes Gomes	15	R3	2-0-1	R3	1-1-1	GS	1-0-2	0
2021–22	**EFL**; **League One**	3	46	10	12	24	57	88	-31	42	**19th of 24**	Cole Stockton	23	R3	2-0-1	R2	1-0-1	GS	0-1-2	4,310
2022–23	**EFL**; **League One**	3	46	10	14	22	47	78	-31	44	**22nd of 24**	Cole Stockton	11	R1	0-0-1	R3	1-1-1	R2	0-3-1	4,572
2022–23	**EFL**; **League One**	3	Relegated to **EFL League Two**.									Cole Stockton	11	R1	0-0-1	R3	1-1-1	R2	0-3-1	4,572
2023–24	**EFL**; **League Two**	4	46	17	10	19	67	81	-14	58 (Note: Morecambe were deducted three points for a financial breach due to the owner (Jason Whittingham) failing to keep the emergency deposit account at the required level (125% of the forecast monthly wage bill), as had previously been agreed with the EFL.)	**15th of 24**	Michael Mellon	13	R3	2-0-1	R1	0-1-0	GS	1-0-2	4,002
2024–25	**EFL**; **League Two**	4	46	10	6	30	40	72	-32	36	**24th of 24**	Lee Angol	7	R3	2-0-1	R1	0-0-1	R2	2-0-2	3,410
2024–25	**EFL**; **League Two**	4	Relegated to the **National League**.									Lee Angol	7	R3	2-0-1	R1	0-0-1	R2	2-0-2	3,410
2025–26	**National**; **League**	5	46	9	11	26	66	103	-37	38	| **22nd of 24**	Jack Nolan	18	QR4	N/A	R1	N/A			
2025–26	**National**; **League**	5	Relegated to the **National League North**.									Jack Nolan	18	QR4	N/A	R1	N/A			
