= 2013–14 Morecambe F.C. season =

Morecambe
2013–14 season
- Chairman: Peter McGuigan
- Manager: Jim Bentley
- Stadium: Globe Arena
- League Two: 18th
- FA Cup: First round
- League Cup: Second round
- League Trophy: Second round
- Biggest win: Morecambe 4–1 Newport County (11 March 2014); Wimbledon 0–3 Morecambe (26 April 2014)
- Biggest defeat: Plymouth Argyle 5–0 Morecambe (1 March 2014)

During the 2013–14 English football season, Morecambe Football Club competed in Football League Two where they finished in 18th position with 54 points.

== Final league table ==
Pos	Team	Pld	W	D	L	GF	GA	GD	Pts
16	Exeter City	46	14	13	19	54	57	−3	55
17	Cheltenham Town	46	13	16	17	53	63	−10	55
18	Morecambe	46	13	15	18	52	64	−12	54
19	Hartlepool United	46	14	11	21	50	56	−6	53
20	AFC Wimbledon	46	14	14	18	49	57	−8	53 (Note: On 28 April AFC Wimbledon were deducted 3 points for fielding an ineligible player.)

Updated to match(es) played on 3 May 2014. Source: BBC Sport
Rules for classification: 1) Points; 2) Goal difference; 3) Number of goals scored

== Results ==
Morecambe's score comes first

=== Legend ===
Win	Draw	Loss

=== Football League Two ===
Match	Date	Opponent	Venue	Result	Attendance	Scorers
1	3 August 2013	Wycombe Wanderers	A	0–1	3,238	
2	10 August 2013	Torquay United	H	1–1	1,555	Williams
3	17 August 2013	Portsmouth	A	0–3	14,590	
4	24 August 2013	Exeter City	H	2–0	1,539	Ellison (2)
5	31 August 2013	Plymouth Argyle	H	2–1	1,800	Ellison, Amond
6	7 September 2013	Southend United	A	3–1	6,080	Fleming (2), Jack Sampson
7	14 September 2013	Newport County	A	3–2	3,165	Amond, Naylor (2 o.g.)
8	21 September 2013	Dagenham & Redbridge	H	2–2	1,790	Amond, Hughes
9	28 September 2013	Northampton Town	A	0–0	3,841	
10	5 October 2013	Chesterfield	H	4–3	2,204	Ellison, Amond, Hughes, Sampson
11	12 October 2013	Bury	A	2–0	3,082	Williams, Diagne
12	19 October 2013	AFC Wimbledon	H	1–1	2,149	Ellison
13	22 October 2013	Cheltenham Town	A	0–3	2,050	
14	26 March 2014	Accrington Stanley	H	1–2	2,175	Sampson
15	2 November 2013	Burton Albion	A	1–0	2,702	Williams
16	16 November 2013	Rochdale	H	1–2	2,563	Amond
17	23 November 2013	Oxford United	H	0–3	4,871	
18	26 November 2013	York City	H	0–0	1,381	
19	30 November 2013	Mansfield Town	A	2–1	2,753	Ellison, Redshaw
20	7 December 2013	Cheltenham Town	H	0–1	1,290	
21	14 December 2013	Bristol Rovers	H	2–1	1,514	Redshaw, Amond
22	21 December 2013	Scunthorpe United	A	0–2	3,510	
23	26 December 2013	Fleetwood Town	H	1–0	3,008	Amond
24	29 December 2013	Hartlepool United	A	1–2	2,081	Sampson
25	1 January 2014	York City	A	0–1	3,276	
26	4 January 2014	Torquay United	A	1–1	2,004	Threlfall
27	11 January 2014	Wycombe Wanderers	H	1–1	1,575	Ellison
28	25 January 2014	Portsmouth	H	2–2	2,550	Hughes, Redshaw
29	8 February 2014	Burton Albion	H	0–1	1,478	
30	15 February 2014	Rochdale	A	1–2	2,344	Redshaw
31	18 February 2014	Exeter City	A	1–1	2,620	Amond
32	22 February 2014	Oxford United	H	1–1	1,614	Diagne
33	1 March 2014	Plymouth Argyle	A	0–5	6,827	
34	8 March 2014	Southend United	H	2–1	1,608	Redshaw, Ellison
35	11 March 2014	Newport County	H	4–1	1,300	Redshaw (2), Ellison, Devitt
36	15 March 2014	Dagenham & Redbridge	A	1–1	1,718	Hughes
37	18 March 2014	Accrington Stanley	A	1–5	1,525	Amond
38	22 March 2014	Northampton Town	H	1–1	1,761	Amond
39	25 March 2014	Chesterfield	A	0–1	4,891	
40	29 March 2014	Bristol Rovers	A	0–1	5,647	
41	5 April 2014	Mansfield Town	H	0–1	1,772	
42	12 April 2014	Fleetwood Town	A	2–2	3,114	Pond (o.g.), Hughes
43	18 April 2014	Scunthorpe United	H	1–1	2,952	Sampson
44	21 April 2014	Hartlepool United	A	1–2	4,864	Ellison
45	26 April 2014	AFC Wimbledon	A	3–0	4,017	Amond, Devitt, Redshaw
46	3 May 2014	Bury	H	0–0	2,944	

=== FA Cup ===
Round	Date	Opponent	Venue	Result	Attendance	Scorers
R1	9 November 2013	Southend United	H	0–3	1,475	

=== League Cup ===
Round	Date	Opponent	Venue	Result	Attendance	Scorers
R1	6 August 2013	Wolverhampton Wanderers	H	1–0	2,545	Williams
R2	28 August 2013	Newcastle United	H	0–2	5,375	

=== Football League Trophy ===
Round	Date	Opponent	Venue	Result	Attendance	Scorers
R1	8 October 2013	Carlisle United	H	0–0 (3–4 pens)	2,297	

== Transfers ==
=== In ===
Date	Position	Name	From†	Fee	Ref.
6 June 2013	DF	Tony Diagne	Macclesfield Town	Undisclosed	
1 July 2013	MF	Marcus Marshall	(Bury)	Free transfer	
1 July 2013	FW	Jack Sampson	(Bolton Wanderers)	Free transfer	
1 July 2013	MF	Alex Kenyon	(Stockport County)	Compensation	
9 July 2013	DF	Mark Hughes	(Bury)	Free transfer	
1 August 2013	FW	Padraig Amond	(Accrington Stanley)	Free transfer	
31 January 2014	DF	Shaun Beeley	(Fleetwood Town)	Free transfer	

† Brackets around club names denote the player's contract with that club had expired before he joined Morecambe.

=== Loans in ===
Date from	Position	Name	From	Date until	Ref.
22 January 2014	MF	Jamie Devitt	Chesterfield	End of season	
21 March 2014	DF	Ryan Edwards	Blackburn Rovers	End of season	
27 March 2014	DF	Jordan Mustoe	Wigan Athletic	End of season	
27 March 2014	DF	Liam Grimshaw	Manchester United	End of season	

=== Out ===
Date	Position	Name	To†	Fee	Ref.
30 June 2013	MF	Gary McDonald	(St Johnstone)	Contract expired	
30 June 2013	DF	Will Haining	(Hyde)	Released	
30 June 2013	FW	Chris Holroyd	(Macclesfield Town)	Released	
30 June 2013	MF	Lewis Alessandra	(Plymouth Argyle)	Contract expired	
30 June 2013	FW	Jordan Burrow	(Stevenage)	Contract expired	
30 June 2013	FW	Danny Carlton	(Hyde)	Released	
30 June 2013	MF	Dan Parkinson	(Barrow)	Released	
30 June 2013	DF	James Short		Released	

† Brackets around club names denote the player joined that club after his Morecambe contract expired.

=== Loans out ===
Date from	Position	Name	To	Date until	Ref.
21 January 2014	MF	Joe Mwasile	Altrincham	21 February 2014	
28 March 2014	MF	Joe Mwasile	Barrow	28 April 2014	

== Squad statistics ==
No.	Pos.	Name	League		FA Cup		League Cup		Other		Total	
No.	Pos.	Name	Apps	Goals	Apps	Goals	Apps	Goals	Apps	Goals	Apps	Goals
1	GK	(Republic of Ireland) Barry Roche	45	0	1	0	2	0	0	0	48	0
2	DF	(England) Shaun Beeley	11(1)	0	0	0	0	0	0	0	11(1)	0
3	DF	(England) Robbie Threlfall	31(3)	1	1	0	0	0	1	0	33(3)	1
4	MF	(England) Alex Kenyon	33(6)	0	0	0	0(2)	0	1	0	34(8)	0
5	DF	(England) Mark Hughes	43(1)	5	0	0	2	0	1	0	46(1)	5
6	DF	(France) Tony Diagne	15(12)	2	0(1)	0	2	0	1	0	18(13)	2
7	FW	(England) Jack Redshaw	14(15)	8	0	0	0	0	0	0	14(15)	8
8	MF	(England) Andrew Wright	30(5)	0	1	0	2	0	1	0	34(5)	0
9	FW	(England) Jack Sampson	31(11)	5	0(1)	0	2	0	1	0	34(12)	5
10	MF	(England) Ryan Williams	21(4)	3	1	0	2	1	0(1)	0	24(5)	4
11	FW	(England) Kevin Ellison	38(4)	10	1	0	1	0	0(1)	0	40(5)	10
12	MF	(Republic of Ireland) Jamie Devitt	14	2	0	0	0	0	0	0	14	0
14	FW	(England) Marcus Marshall	6(9)	0	1	0	0(1)	0	0	0	7(10)	0
15	DF	(England) Chris McCready	20(2)	0	1	0	0	0	0	0	21(2)	0
16	MF	(England) Stewart Drummond	31(4)	0	1	0	2	0	0	0	34(4)	0
17	MF	(England) Andrew Fleming	33(2)	2	1	0	2	0	1	0	37(2)	2
19	MF	(England) Joe McGee	3(8)	0	0	0	0(1)	0	1	0	4(9)	0
20	MF	(England) Joe Mwasile	2(17)	0	0(1)	0	1(1)	0	1	0	4(19)	0
21	MF	(England) Aaron McGowan	0(2)	0	0	0	0	0	0	0	0(2)	0
22	DF	(England) Andy Parrish	38(1)	0	1	0	2	0	1	0	42(1)	0
23	DF	(England) Chris Doyle	1(2)	0	0	0	0	0	0	0	1(2)	0
25	GK	(England) Andreas Arestidou	1	0	0	0	0	0	1	0	2	0
27	FW	(Republic of Ireland) Pádraig Amond	33(12)	11	1	0	2	0	1	0	37(12)	11
34	DF	(England) Ryan Edwards	8(1)	0	0	0	0	0	0	0	8(1)	0
37	DF	(England) Jordan Mustoe	4(1)	0	0	0	0	0	0	0	4(1)	0
