= 2014–15 Morecambe F.C. season =

Morecambe
2014–15 season
- Chairman: Peter McGuigan
- Manager: Jim Bentley
- Stadium: Globe Arena
- League Two: 11th
- FA Cup: First round
- League Cup: First round
- League Trophy: Second round
- Top goalscorer: League: Jack Redshaw (11); Kevin Ellison (11); All: Jack Redshaw (12)
- Highest home attendance: 4,165 v Carlisle United; 26 December 2014
- Lowest home attendance: 1,156 v Mansfield Town; 10 February 2015
- Average home league attendance: 1,998
- Biggest win: Dagenham & Redbridge 0–3 Morecambe; 9 August 2014; Morecambe 3–0 Luton Town; 13 December 2014
- Biggest defeat: Portsmouth 3–0 Morecambe; 22 November 2014; Morecambe 1–4 Shrewsbury Town; 17 March 2015
| Home colours | Away colours |
- All statistics correct as of match played 2 May 2015.

The 2014–15 season was Morecambe's eighth consecutive season in League Two, the fourth tier of English football.

They began the season on 9 August 2014, with the opening match of their League Two campaign. They also competed in three cup competitions, the FA Cup, the League Cup and the League Trophy. However, they only made it past the First Round in the League Trophy, losing 3–1 away to fellow League Two side Bury in the Second Round on 7 October 2014.

The season ended with a 3–1 home win over Southend United on 2 May 2015, securing an 11th-place finish in the league, the club's highest under Jim Bentley's management.

== Competitions ==
=== Pre-season and friendlies ===
| 19 July 2014 | Morecambe | 2–4 | (Scotland) Dundee | Morecambe |
| 15:00 | Amond 2'; Edwards 66' | Report | Cadogan 25'; Harkins 40'; Boyle 72'; MacDonald 90' | Stadium: Globe Arena |

| 25 July 2014 | Morecambe | 1–2 | Preston North End | Morecambe |
| 19:30 | Williams 63' | Report | Garner 19'; Keane 82' | Stadium: Globe Arena; Attendance: 1,364; Referee: Ross Joyce |

=== League Two ===
==== League table ====
| Pos | Team | Pld | W | D | L | GF | GA | GD | Pts |
|---|---|---|---|---|---|---|---|---|---|
| 9 | Newport County | 46 | 18 | 11 | 17 | 51 | 54 | −3 | 65 |
| 10 | Exeter City | 46 | 17 | 13 | 16 | 61 | 65 | −4 | 64 |
| 11 | Morecambe | 46 | 17 | 12 | 17 | 53 | 52 | +1 | 63 |
| 12 | Northampton Town | 46 | 18 | 7 | 21 | 67 | 62 | +5 | 61 |
| 13 | Oxford United | 46 | 15 | 16 | 15 | 50 | 49 | +1 | 61 |

Updated to match(es) played on 23 May 2015. Source: BBC Sport
Rules for classification: 1) Points; 2) Goal difference; 3) Number of goals scored

==== Matches ====
The fixtures for the 2014–15 season were announced on 18 June 2014 at 9am.

| 9 August 2014 1 | Dagenham & Redbridge | 0–3 | Morecambe | Dagenham |
| 15:00 | | Report | Ellison 49'; Amond 54' (pen.); Redshaw 90+5' | Stadium: Victoria Road; Attendance: 1,529; Referee: Patrick Miller |

| 16 August 2014 2 | Morecambe | 3–2 | Newport County | Morecambe |
| 15:00 | Ellison 58', 63'; Mullin 84' | Report | Chapman 27'; O'Connor 29' | Stadium: Globe Arena; Attendance: 1,506; Referee: Seb Stockbridge |

| 19 August 2014 3 | Morecambe | 1–0 | Oxford United | Morecambe |
| 19:45 | Ellison 39' | Report | | Stadium: Globe Arena; Attendance: 1,615; Referee: Tony Harrington |

| 23 August 2014 4 | Cambridge United | 1–2 | Morecambe | Cambridge |
| 15:00 | Elliott 55' | Report | Mullin 16', 61' | Stadium: Abbey Stadium; Attendance: 3,152; Referee: Charles Breakspear |

| 30 August 2014 5 | Tranmere Rovers | 2–1 | Morecambe | Tranmere |
| 15:00 | Stockton 58', 90' | Report | Hughes 39' (red card) 63' | Stadium: Prenton Park; Attendance: 4,656; Referee: Mark Haywood |

| 6 September 2014 6 | Morecambe | 0–0 | Cheltenham Town | Morecambe |
| 15:00 | | Report | | Stadium: Globe Arena; Attendance: 2,273; Referee: Mark Heywood |

| 13 September 2014 7 | Morecambe | 2–1 | Plymouth Argyle | Morecambe |
| 15:00 | Ellison 19'; Devitt 83' | Report | Hartley 25' | Stadium: Globe Arena; Attendance: 1,865; Referee: Chris Kavanagh |

| 16 September 2014 8 | Mansfield Town | 1–0 | Morecambe | Mansfield |
| 19:45 | Fisher 90' | Report | | Stadium: Field Mill; Attendance: 2,185; Referee: Stephen Martin |

| 20 September 2014 9 | AFC Wimbledon | 1–0 | Morecambe | Kingston upon Thames |
| 15:00 | Akinfenwa 27' | Report | | Stadium: Kingsmeadow; Attendance: 3,822; Referee: Darren Drysdale |

| 27 September 2014 10 | Morecambe | 0–1 | Northampton Town | Morecambe |
| 15:00 | Mullin (yellow card) 90+3' | Report | Byrom (yellow card) 20'; Toney 33' | Stadium: Globe Arena; Attendance: 1,725; Referee: Scott Duncan |

| 4 October 2014 11 | Southend United | 0–1 | Morecambe | Southend-on-Sea |
| 15:00 | Deegan (yellow card) 21' | Report | Redshaw 5'; Beeley (yellow card) 25'; Ellison (yellow card) 90+1' | Stadium: Roots Hall; Attendance: 5,284; Referee: Andy Woolmer |

| 11 October 2014 12 | Morecambe | 1–3 | Wycombe Wanderers | Morecambe |
| 15:00 | Ellison (yellow card) 43'; Fleming 45+3'; Devitt (red card) 50' | Report | Wood 10' (yellow card) 52'; Hayes 15'; Scowen (yellow card) 46'; Jacobson 72'; Craig (yellow card) 84' | Stadium: Globe Arena; Attendance: 1,710; Referee: Phil Gibbs |

| 18 October 2014 13 | Burton Albion | 0–2 | Morecambe | Burton upon Trent |
| 15:00 | | Report | Fleming (yellow card) 56'; Ellison 59'; Kenyon 61'; Barkhuizen (yellow card) 85' | Stadium: Pirelli Stadium; Attendance: 2,560; Referee: Carl Boyeson |

| 21 October 2014 14 | Morecambe | 1–1 | York City | Morecambe |
| 19:45 | Redshaw 90+4' | Report | Montrose (yellow card) 39'; Coulson 77' | Stadium: Globe Arena; Attendance: 1,346; Referee: Andy Haines |

| 25 October 2014 15 | Morecambe | 0–2 | Exeter City | Morecambe |
| 15:00 | | Report | Beeley 9' (o.g.); Nichols 89' | Stadium: Globe Arena; Attendance: 1,787; Referee: Geoff Eltringham |

| 31 October 2014 16 | Accrington Stanley | 2–1 | Morecambe | Accrington |
| 19:45 | Joyce 5' (pen.); McCartan 11'; Hunt (yellow card) 90+1'; Aldred (yellow card) 90+6' | Report | Hughes (yellow card) 40'; Mullin 51'; Beeley (yellow card) 58'; Wilson (yellow card) 67' | Stadium: Crown Ground; Attendance: 1,710; Referee: Stephen Martin |

| 15 November 2014 17 | Morecambe | 1–0 | Bury | Morecambe |
| 15:00 | Fleming (yellow card) 55'; Ellison 70' | Report | Cameron (yellow card) 81' | Stadium: Globe Arena; Attendance: 2,665; Referee: David Coote |

| 22 November 2014 18 | Portsmouth | 3–0 | Morecambe | Portsmouth |
| 15:00 | Westcarr 11'; Whatmough (yellow card) 19'; Bean (yellow card) 36'; Wallace 54', 88' | Report | Goodall (yellow card) 46'; Ellison (yellow card) 70'; Hughes (yellow card) 82'; Davies (yellow card) 84' | Stadium: Fratton Park; Attendance: 14,349; Referee: Gavin Ward |

| 29 November 2014 19 | Stevenage | 1–1 | Morecambe | Stevenage |
| 15:00 | Walton 62' (pen.); Adams (yellow card) 78' | Report | Amond 85' | Stadium: Lamex Stadium; Attendance: 2,464; Referee: Mark Heywood |

| 13 December 2014 20 | Morecambe | 3–0 | Luton Town | Morecambe |
| 15:00 | Ellison 17'; Edwards (yellow card) 31'; Hughes 45'; Amond 81'; Ellison (yellow card) 86' | Report | McNulty (yellow card) 26' (yellow-red card) 28'; Lafayette (yellow card) 86' | Stadium: Globe Arena; Attendance: 2,263; Referee: Andy D'Urso |

| 20 December 2014 21 | Shrewsbury Town | 1–0 | Morecambe | Shrewsbury |
| 15:00 | Woods (yellow card) 51'; Mangan 86' | Report | Edwards (yellow card) 82' | Stadium: Greenhous Meadow; Attendance: 4,708; Referee: Kevin Wright |

| 26 December 2014 22 | Morecambe | 0–1 | Carlisle United | Morecambe |
| 15:00 | | Report | Amoo 51'; Meppen-Walter (yellow card) 75'; Hanford (yellow card) 88'; Beck (yellow card) 90+1' | Stadium: Globe Arena; Attendance: 4,165; Referee: Richard Clark |

| 28 December 2014 23 | Hartlepool United | 0–2 | Morecambe | Hartlepool |
| 15:00 | Fenwick (yellow card) 35'; Holden (yellow card) 80' | Report | Redshaw 22', 81'; Mullin (yellow card) 43'; Williams (yellow card) 90+3'; Ellison (yellow card) 90+4' | Stadium: Victoria Park; Attendance: 4,108; Referee: Darren Drysdale |

| 3 January 2015 24 | Morecambe | 0–0 | Stevenage | Morecambe |
| 15:00 | Devitt (yellow card) 36'; Mullin (yellow card) 74' | Report | Henry (yellow card) 34'; Charles (yellow card) 90+4' | Stadium: Globe Arena; Attendance: 1,530; Referee: Chris Sarginson |

| 10 January 2015 25 | Morecambe | 0–0 | Tranmere Rovers | Morecambe |
| 15:00 | Devitt (yellow card) 53' | Report | | Stadium: Globe Arena; Attendance: 2,232; Referee: Eddie Ilderton |

| 16 January 2015 26 | Cheltenham Town | 1–1 | Morecambe | Cheltenham |
| 19:45 | Dunn 18' (pen.); Sterling-James (yellow card) 90' | Report | Amond 83' (pen.) | Stadium: Whaddon Road; Attendance: 2,122; Referee: Tim Robinson |

| 24 January 2015 27 | Plymouth Argyle | 1–1 | Morecambe | Plymouth |
| 15:00 | Reid 45+3'; McHugh (yellow card) 88' | Report | Parrish (yellow card) 15'; Redshaw 52'; Goodall (yellow card) 80' | Stadium: Home Park; Attendance: 6,314; Referee: Oliver Langford |

| 31 January 2015 28 | Morecambe | 1–1 | AFC Wimbledon | Morecambe |
| 15:00 | Amond 42'; Redshaw (yellow card) 79' | Report | Reeves 12' | Stadium: Globe Arena; Attendance: 1,841; Referee: Pat Miller |

| 7 February 2015 29 | Northampton Town | 2–1 | Morecambe | Northampton |
| 15:00 | Byrom 1'; Richards 54'; Taylor (yellow card) 90+4' | Report | Devitt 41'; Hughes (yellow card) 69' | Stadium: Sixfields Stadium; Attendance: 4,307; Referee: Robert Lewis |

| 10 February 2015 30 | Morecambe | 2–1 | Mansfield Town | Morecambe |
| 19:45 | Mullin 17'; Ellison 24'; Fleming (yellow card) 51' | Report | Heslop 27' (yellow card) 62'; McGuire (yellow card) 37' | Stadium: Globe Arena; Attendance: 1,156; Referee: Darren Bond |

| 15 February 2015 31 | Morecambe | 2–3 | Dagenham & Redbridge | Morecambe |
| 13:00 | Fleming 24' (yellow card) 82'; Edwards (yellow card) 47'; Redshaw 90+5' | Report | Howell 1'; Obileye 48'; Cureton 52' | Stadium: Globe Arena; Attendance: 1,351; Referee: Tony Harrington |

| 21 February 2015 32 | Newport County | 0–1 | Morecambe | Newport |
| 15:00 | Jackson (yellow card) 64'; Zebroski (yellow card) 82' | Report | Redshaw 8'; Parrish (yellow card) 39' | Stadium: Rodney Parade; Attendance: 2,883; Referee: Andy D'Urso |

| 28 February 2015 33 | Morecambe | 0–2 | Cambridge United | Morecambe |
| 15:00 | Wilson (yellow card) 61'; Edwards (yellow card) 76' | Report | Donaldson 45'; Slew 59'; Harrold (yellow card) 61'; Champion (yellow card) 85' | Stadium: Globe Arena; Attendance: 1,593; Referee: Darren Handley |

| 3 March 2015 34 | Oxford United | 1–1 | Morecambe | Oxford |
| 19:45 | Baldock 87' | Report | Ellison 11'; Fleming (yellow card) 43'; Beeley (yellow card) 80' | Stadium: Kassam Stadium; Attendance: 6,924; Referee: Fred Graham |

| 7 March 2015 35 | Luton Town | 2–3 | Morecambe | Luton |
| 15:00 | McGeehan (yellow card) 5' (goal) 43'; McNulty (yellow card) 65'; Lawless 76'; Lee (yellow card) 84'; Oduwa (yellow card) 90+4'; Wilkinson (yellow card) 90+6' | Report | Redshaw 18' (yellow card) 67'; Wilson 29' (yellow card) 63'; Beeley (yellow card) 64'; Edwards (yellow card) 71' (yellow-red card) 80'; Fleming (yellow card) 81'; Hughes (yellow card) 84'; Wilkinson 86' (o.g.) | Stadium: Kenilworth Road; Attendance: 8,667; Referee: Carl Berry |

| 14 March 2015 36 | Morecambe | 0–1 | Hartlepool United | Morecambe |
| 15:00 | | Report | Parrish 35' (o.g.) | Stadium: Globe Arena; Attendance: 1,673; Referee: Mark Haywood |

| 17 March 2015 37 | Morecambe | 1–4 | Shrewsbury Town | Morecambe |
| 19:45 | Redshaw 28' (yellow card) 74'; Arestidou (red card) 49'; Drummond (yellow card) 62' | Report | Goldson 33'; Collins 35'; Grant (yellow card) 40'; Grandison 84'; Barnett 90+4' | Stadium: Globe Arena; Attendance: 1,363; Referee: Stuart Attwell |

| 21 March 2015 38 | Carlisle United | 1–1 | Morecambe | Carlisle |
| 15:00 | Potts 53'; Wyke (yellow card) 82' | Report | Redshaw (yellow card) 19'; Amond 78' (pen.) | Stadium: Brunton Park; Attendance: 4,343; Referee: Peter Bankes |

| 28 March 2015 39 | Exeter City | 1–1 | Morecambe | Exeter |
| 15:00 | Nicholls 80'; Nichols (red card) 90+5' | Report | McGowan 17'; Kenyon (yellow card) 18'; Wilson (yellow card) 75'; Hughes (yellow card) 89' | Stadium: St James Park; Attendance: 3,538; Referee: Michael Bull |

| 3 April 2015 40 | Morecambe | 1–1 | Accrington Stanley | Morecambe |
| 15:00 | Ellison 25'; Edwards (yellow card) 53' | Report | Jones 28'; Gornell (red card) 41'; Crooks (yellow card) 83' | Stadium: Globe Arena; Attendance: 1,982; Referee: Eddie Ilderton |

| 6 April 2015 41 | Bury | 1–2 | Morecambe | Bury |
| 15:00 | Eaves 17' | Report | Goodall (yellow card) 29'; Amond 79'; Mullin 85' | Stadium: Gigg Lane; Attendance: 4,045; Referee: Darren Bond |

| 11 April 2015 42 | Morecambe | 3–1 | Portsmouth | Morecambe |
| 15:00 | Kenyon 10', 69'; Amond 90+3' | Report | Chaplin 85' | Stadium: Globe Arena; Attendance: 2,065; Referee: Steve Martin |

| 14 April 2015 43 | York City | 2–1 | Morecambe | York |
| 19:45 | Zubar 34'; Penn 51' | Report | Mullin 10'; Hughes (yellow card) 84' | Stadium: Bootham Crescent; Attendance: 2,854; Referee: Scott Duncan |

| 18 April 2015 44 | Morecambe | 1–2 | Burton Albion | Morecambe |
| 15:00 | Kenyon (yellow card) 8'; Ellison (yellow card) 40'; Arestidou (yellow card) 60'; Hughes 90' | Report | Akins 30', 60' (pen.); Edwards (yellow card) 87' | Stadium: Globe Arena; Attendance: 2,139; Referee: Keith Stroud |

| 25 April 2015 45 | Wycombe Wanderers | 0–1 | Morecambe | High Wycombe |
| 15:00 | Amadi-Holloway (yellow card) 82'; Bloomfield (yellow card) 85' | Report | Redshaw (yellow card) 39'; Fleming (yellow card) 41'; Hughes (yellow card) 45+2'; Parrish (yellow card) 61'; Mullin 86' | Stadium: Adams Park; Attendance: 5,177; Referee: Lee Collins |

| 2 May 2015 46 | Morecambe | 3–1 | Southend United | Morecambe |
| 15:00 | Redshaw 4'; Wildig 54'; Devitt 66' | Report | Payne 10'; Deegan (yellow card) 30' | Stadium: Globe Arena; Attendance: 4,108; Referee: James Adcock |

=== FA Cup ===
The draw for the first round of the FA Cup was made on 27 October 2014.

| 8 November 2014 First Round | Dover Athletic | 1–0 | Morecambe | River |
| 15:00 | Kinnear (yellow card) 18'; Payne 45+1' | Report | Kenyon (yellow card) 76'; Wright (yellow card) 77' | Stadium: Crabble Athletic Ground; Attendance: 1,609; Referee: Michael Bull |

=== League Cup ===
The draw for the first round was made on 17 June 2014 at 10am. Morecambe were drawn at home to Bradford City.

| 12 August 2014 First Round | Morecambe | 0–1 | Bradford City | Morecambe |
| 19:45 | | Report | McLean 83' | Stadium: Globe Arena; Attendance: 2,395; Referee: Scott Duncan |

=== League Trophy ===
| 2 September 2014 First Round | Fleetwood Town | 1–3 | Morecambe | Fleetwood |
| 19:45 | Evans 12' | Report | Amond 28', 80'; Redshaw 34' | Stadium: Highbury Stadium; Attendance: 2,048; Referee: Chris Sarginson |

| 7 October 2014 Second Round | Bury | 3–1 | Morecambe | Bury |
| 19:45 | Nardiello 14' (pen.), 39'; Soares (yellow card) 76'; Hussey (yellow card) 84'; Lowe (yellow card) 90+1' (goal) 90+4'; Rose (yellow card) 90+2'; Jalal (yellow card) 90+3' | Report | Beeley 74' | Stadium: Gigg Lane; Attendance: 1,681; Referee: Graham Salisbury |

== Transfers ==
=== In ===
| Date | Name | From | Fee | Ref |
|---|---|---|---|---|
| 20 May 2014 | (England) Shaun Beeley | (England) Fleetwood Town | Free | |
| 20 May 2014 | (Republic of Ireland) Jamie Devitt | (England) Chesterfield | Free | |
| 20 May 2014 | (England) Paul Bowman | (England) Blackburn Rovers | Free | |
| 15 July 2014 | (England) Alan Goodall | (England) Fleetwood Town | Free | |
| 16 July 2014 | (England) Laurence Wilson | (England) Accrington Stanley | Free | |
| 23 July 2014 | (England) Tom McCready | (Wales) Airbus UK Broughton | Free | |
| 2 August 2014 | (England) Paul Mullin | (England) Huddersfield Town | Free | |

=== Out ===
| Date | Name | To | Fee | Ref |
|---|---|---|---|---|
| 6 May 2014 | (England) Chris McCready | Released | Free | |
| 6 May 2014 | (England) Joe McGee | Released | Free | |
| 6 May 2014 | (England) Joe Mwasile | (England) Workington | Free | |
| 6 May 2014 | (England) Robbie Threlfall | Released | Free | |
| 1 July 2014 | (France) Tony Diagne | (England) Lincoln City | Free | |
| 2 February 2015 | (England) Tom McCready | (England) Exeter City | Free | |

=== Loans in ===
| Date | Name | From | End date | Ref |
|---|---|---|---|---|
| 29 August 2014 | (England) Joe Widdowson | (England) Bury | 29 October 2014 | |
| 17 October 2014 | (England) Tom Barkhuizen | (England) Blackpool | 15 November 2014 | |
| 24 October 2014 | (England) Scott Davies | (England) Fleetwood Town | 3 January 2015 | |
| 20 March 2015 | (Wales) Danny Ward | (England) Liverpool | 19 April 2015 | |
| 20 March 2015 | (England) Aaron Wildig | (England) Shrewsbury Town | 19 April 2015 | |

=== Loans out ===
| Date | Name | To | End date | Ref |
|---|---|---|---|---|
| 1 August 2014 | (England) Marcus Marshall | (England) Lincoln City | 30 June 2015 | |
| 20 August 2014 | (England) Will Bell | (Wales) Bala Town | 30 June 2015 | |
| 24 February 2015 | (England) Chris Doyle | (England) Chorley | 24 March 2015 | |
| 26 March 2015 | (England) Jack Sampson | (England) Macclesfield Town | 30 June 2015 | |

== See also ==
- List of Morecambe F.C. seasons
