= 2012–13 Morecambe F.C. season =

Morecambe
2012–13 season
- Chairman: Peter McGuigan
- Manager: Jim Bentley
- Stadium: Globe Arena
- League Two: 16th
- FA Cup: Second Round
- League Cup: Second Round
- League Trophy: Second Round
- Biggest win: Exeter City 0–3 Morecambe; 18 August 2012; Bristol Rovers 0–3 Morecambe; 1 September 2012; Morecambe 4–1 Barnet; 10 November 2012; York City 1–4 Morecambe; 2 February 2013; Morecambe 3–0 Rochdale; 2 March 2013
- Biggest defeat: Morecambe 0–4 Fleetwood Town; 8 September 2012
- All statistics correct as of match played 27 April 2013.

During the 2012–13 English football season, Morecambe Football Club competed in Football League Two where they finished in 16th position with 58 points.

== Final league table ==
| Pos | Team | Pld | W | D | L | GF | GA | GD | Pts |
|---|---|---|---|---|---|---|---|---|---|
| 14 | Bristol Rovers | 46 | 16 | 12 | 18 | 60 | 69 | −9 | 60 |
| 15 | Wycombe Wanderers | 46 | 17 | 9 | 20 | 50 | 60 | −10 | 60 |
| 16 | Morecambe | 46 | 15 | 13 | 18 | 55 | 61 | −6 | 58 |
| 17 | York City | 46 | 12 | 19 | 15 | 50 | 60 | −10 | 55 |
| 18 | Accrington Stanley | 46 | 14 | 12 | 20 | 51 | 68 | −17 | 54 |

Updated to match(es) played on 27 April 2013. Source: BBC Sport
Rules for classification: 1) Points; 2) Goal difference; 3) Number of goals scored

== Results ==
Morecambe's score comes first

=== Legend ===
| Win | Draw | Loss |

=== Football League Two ===
| Match | Date | Opponent | Venue | Result | Attendance | Scorers |
|---|---|---|---|---|---|---|
| 1 | 18 August 2012 | Exeter City | A | 3–0 | 3,792 | Fleming (2), Reid |
| 2 | 21 August 2012 | York City | H | 2–2 | 2,063 | Richard Brodie, Drummond |
| 3 | 25 August 2012 | Port Vale | H | 1–3 | 2,164 | Ellison |
| 4 | 1 September 2012 | Bristol Rovers | A | 3–0 | 5,207 | McDonald, Ellison, Fenton |
| 5 | 8 September 2012 | Fleetwood Town | H | 0–4 | 3,232 | |
| 6 | 15 September 2012 | Aldershot Town | A | 0–0 | 1,196 | |
| 7 | 18 September 2012 | Bradford City | A | 1–3 | 9,054 | Redshaw |
| 8 | 22 September 2012 | Plymouth Argyle | H | 2–3 | 1,865 | Redshaw, Richard Brodie |
| 9 | 28 September 2012 | Cheltenham Town | A | 0–2 | 2,563 | |
| 10 | 2 October 2012 | Chesterfield | H | 2–0 | 1,285 | McDonald, Alessandra |
| 11 | 6 October 2012 | Burton Albion | H | 0–0 | 1,585 | |
| 12 | 13 October 2012 | Rochdale | A | 2–1 | 2,493 | Redshaw (2) |
| 13 | 20 October 2012 | Southend United | H | 1–0 | 1,643 | Redshaw |
| 14 | 23 October 2012 | Rotherham United | A | 1–2 | 5,632 | Ellison |
| 15 | 27 October 2012 | Torquay United | A | 0–1 | 2,457 | |
| 16 | 6 November 2012 | Accrington Stanley | H | 0–0 | 1,410 | |
| 17 | 10 November 2012 | Barnet | H | 4–1 | 1,653 | Fleming, Ellison, Richard Brodie (2) |
| 18 | 17 November 2012 | Gillingham | A | 1–2 | 5,402 | Redshaw |
| 19 | 20 November 2012 | Northampton Town | A | 0–3 | 4,013 | |
| 20 | 24 November 2012 | AFC Wimbledon | H | 3–1 | 1,616 | Ellison (3) |
| 21 | 8 December 2012 | Wycombe Wanderers | A | 2–2 | 3,238 | Richard Brodie, Redshaw |
| 22 | 15 December 2012 | Oxford United | H | 1–1 | 1,385 | Ellison |
| 23 | 26 December 2012 | Fleetwood Town | A | 0–1 | 3,477 | |
| 24 | 29 December 2012 | Chesterfield | A | 1–1 | 6,358 | McCready |
| 25 | 1 January 2013 | Bradford City | H | 0–0 | 3,635 | |
| 26 | 8 January 2013 | Dagenham & Redbridge | H | 2–1 | 4,029 | Parrish, Burrow |
| 27 | 12 January 2013 | Plymouth Argyle | A | 1–2 | 6,401 | Williams |
| 28 | 18 January 2013 | Cheltenham Town | H | 0–0 | 1,586 | |
| 29 | 26 January 2013 | Dagenham & Redbridge | A | 2–1 | 1,370 | Williams, Drummond |
| 30 | 2 February 2013 | York City | A | 4–1 | 3,138 | Alessandra, Ellison, Redshaw (2) |
| 31 | 9 February 2013 | Exeter City | H | 0–3 | 1,840 | |
| 32 | 12 February 2013 | Aldershot Town | H | 2–1 | 1,226 | Risser (o.g.), McDonald |
| 33 | 16 February 2013 | Port Vale | A | 1–0 | 5,513 | Alessandra |
| 34 | 23 February 2013 | Bristol Rovers | H | 1–1 | 1,736 | Redshaw |
| 35 | 26 February 2013 | Burton Albion | A | 2–3 | 2,170 | Redshaw, Holroyd |
| 36 | 2 March 2013 | Rochdale | H | 3–0 | 2,028 | Fleming, McCready, Ellison |
| 37 | 9 March 2013 | Barnet | A | 1–4 | 2,012 | Redshaw |
| 38 | 12 March 2013 | Northampton Town | H | 1–1 | 1,366 | Redshaw |
| 39 | 16 March 2013 | Gillingham | H | 1–1 | 1,674 | Redshaw |
| 40 | 23 March 2013 | AFC Wimbledon | A | 0–2 | 3,902 | |
| 41 | 29 March 2013 | Oxford United | A | 1–1 | 5,523 | Redshaw |
| 42 | 1 April 2013 | Wycombe Wanderers | H | 0–1 | 1,702 | |
| 43 | 6 April 2013 | Rotherham United | H | 2–1 | 2,197 | Ellison, Threlfall |
| 44 | 12 April 2013 | Accrington Stanley | A | 0–2 | 2,473 | |
| 45 | 20 April 2013 | Torquay United | H | 0–2 | 2,033 | |
| 46 | 27 April 2013 | Southend United | A | 1–0 | 5,081 | Fleming |

=== FA Cup ===
| Round | Date | Opponent | Venue | Result | Attendance | Scorers |
|---|---|---|---|---|---|---|
| R1 | 3 November 2012 | Rochdale | H | 1–1 | 1,893 | Fleming |
| R1 Replay | 13 November 2012 | Rochdale | A | 1–0 | 1,675 | McDonald |
| R2 | 1 December 2012 | Coventry City | A | 1–2 | 6,339 | Ellison |

=== League Cup ===
| Round | Date | Opponent | Venue | Result | Attendance | Scorers |
|---|---|---|---|---|---|---|
| R1 | 12 August 2012 | Blackpool | A | 2–1 | 6,083 | Alessandra, Fleming |
| R2 | 28 August 2012 | Sunderland | A | 0–2 | 22,871 | Richard Brodie, Mustoe |

=== Football League Trophy ===
| Round | Date | Opponent | Venue | Result | Attendance | Scorers |
|---|---|---|---|---|---|---|
| R1 | 4 September 2012 | Accrington Stanley | A | 2–0 | 1,049 | Redshaw, Ellison |
| R2 | 9 October 2012 | Preston North End | H | 2–4 | 2,577 | |

== Squad statistics ==
| No. | Pos. | Name | League | | FA Cup | | League Cup | | Other | | Total | |
| No. | Pos. | Name | Apps | Goals | Apps | Goals | Apps | Goals | Apps | Goals | Apps | Goals |
|---|---|---|---|---|---|---|---|---|---|---|---|---|
| 1 | GK | (Republic of Ireland) Barry Roche | 42 | 0 | 3 | 0 | 2 | 0 | 0 | 0 | 0 | 0 |
| 2 | DF | (England) Nick Fenton | 37(1) | 1 | 3 | 0 | 1 | 0 | 2 | 0 | 43(1) | 1 |
| 3 | DF | (England) Robbie Threlfall | 20(5) | 1 | 1 | 0 | 2 | 0 | 0 | 0 | 23(5) | 1 |
| 4 | DF | (England) Jordan Mustoe | 10(1) | 1 | 0 | 0 | 0 | 0 | 1 | 1 | 11(1) | 1 |
| 6 | DF | (Scotland) Will Haining | 33(3) | 0 | 1(1) | 0 | 2 | 0 | 1 | 0 | 37(4) | 0 |
| 7 | MF | (England) Izak Reid | 9(9) | 1 | 1(1) | 0 | 1 | 0 | 2 | 0 | 13(10) | 1 |
| 8 | MF | (England) Andrew Wright | 39(1) | 0 | 3 | 0 | 2 | 0 | 1 | 0 | 45(1) | 0 |
| 9 | FW | (England) Lewis Alessandra | 31(9) | 3 | 3 | 0 | 2 | 1 | 0(2) | 0 | 36(11) | 4 |
| 10 | MF | (England) Ryan Williams | 10(6) | 2 | 0 | 0 | 0 | 0 | 0 | 0 | 10(6) | 2 |
| 10 | FW | (England) Richard Brodie | 15(8) | 5 | 0 | 0 | 1(1) | 0 | 1(1) | 1 | 17(10) | 6 |
| 11 | FW | (England) Kevin Ellison | 38(2) | 11 | 3 | 1 | 1(1) | 0 | 1 | 1 | 43(3) | 13 |
| 12 | MF | (England) Dan Parkinson | 0(3) | 0 | 0(3) | 0 | 0 | 0 | 0 | 0 | 0(6) | 0 |
| 14 | FW | (England) Jordan Burrow | 12(20) | 1 | 0 | 0 | 1 | 0 | 2 | 0 | 15(20) | 1 |
| 15 | DF | (England) Chris McCready | 37(3) | 2 | 2 | 0 | 1 | 0 | 2 | 0 | 42(3) | 2 |
| 16 | MF | (England) Stewart Drummond | 41(3) | 2 | 3 | 0 | 0(1) | 0 | 1(1) | 0 | 45(5) | 2 |
| 17 | MF | (England) Andrew Fleming | 29(3) | 5 | 3 | 1 | 2 | 1 | 2 | 0 | 36(3) | 7 |
| 18 | MF | (Scotland) Gary McDonald | 40(3) | 3 | 3 | 1 | 2 | 0 | 1 | 0 | 46(3) | 4 |
| 19 | MF | (England) Joe McGee | 1(2) | 0 | 0 | 0 | 0 | 0 | 2 | 0 | 3(1) | 0 |
| 20 | MF | (England) Joe Mwasile | 1(4) | 0 | 0 | 0 | 0 | 0 | 0(1) | 0 | 1(5) | 0 |
| 21 | MF | (England) Aaron McGowan | 0(1) | 0 | 0 | 0 | 0 | 0 | 0 | 0 | 0(1) | 0 |
| 22 | DF | (England) Andy Parrish | 23(2) | 1 | 2 | 0 | 2 | 0 | 0 | 0 | 27(2) | 1 |
| 23 | DF | (England) Chris Doyle | 1(3) | 0 | 0 | 0 | 0 | 0 | 0 | 0 | 1(3) | 0 |
| 25 | GK | (England) Andreas Arestidou | 4(2) | 0 | 0 | 0 | 0 | 0 | 2 | 0 | 6(2) | 0 |
| 26 | FW | (England) Chris Holroyd | 8(8) | 1 | 0 | 0 | 0 | 0 | 0 | 0 | 8(8) | 1 |
| 27 | FW | (England) Jack Redshaw | 25(15) | 15 | 2 | 0 | 0(1) | 0 | 1(1) | 1 | 28(17) | 16 |
| 30 | FW | (England) Danny Carlton | 0(2) | 0 | 0 | 0 | 0(2) | 0 | 0 | 0 | 0(4) | 0 |
