= Lancaster and Morecambe College =

College in Lancashire, England

Location
- Morecambe Road; Lancaster, Lancashire, LA1 2TY; England
- Coordinates: 54.0626°N 2.8274°W

Information
- Type: Further Education
- Motto: Transforming lives and communities
- Established: 1950
- Local authority: Lancashire
- Department for Education URN: 130737 Tables
- Ofsted: Reports
- Principal: Daniel Braithwaite
- Gender: Mixed
- Age: 16+
- Website: https://www.lmc.ac.uk/

Lancaster and Morecambe College is a further education College situated on Torrisholme Road, between Lancaster and Morecambe, Lancashire, England. The college has been providing the local area with access to further and higher education since it was built in the 1950s although it can trace its mission back to Lancaster Mechanics Institute in 1824.

== Facilities ==
Lancaster & Morecambe College has a wide range of facilities open to the public such as a sports centre, conferencing facilities, hairdressing salon, beauty salon, engineering and construction workshops, restaurant, nursery. A dedicated Employer Hub provides a space for businesses to meet, learn and train their workforce.

== Apprenticeships ==
Apprenticeships are aimed at people aged 16–24 and provide students with a chance to gain work experience alongside a national recognised qualification.

== History ==
While the college in its present incarnation has only existed since the 1950s, Lancaster and Morecambe College traces its existence back to the early 19th century. The history of the college begins in 1824, when the Library and Mechanics' Institute was opened in Mary Street, Lancaster. The college moved from various sites before being re-established in 1891 as the Storey Institute, a recently constructed premises complete with purpose-built facilities.

The new premises were built on the site of the Mechanics' Institute of 1824. It was built to a design by Paley, Austin and Paley, and was paid for by Thomas Storey (which is why it became known as the Storey Institute). It was donated to the town in 1893 as a technical and science school, newsroom, library, art school and gallery and venue for musical recitals. In 1904, Thomas' son Herbert gave £10,000 to extend the Institute up Castle Hill.

In 1953, the College was again re-established, this time on its present site. In 1963, the College was officially opened by Prince Philip, Duke of Edinburgh.

== Notable Former Students ==
- Lisa Allen Head Chef at Northcote (hotel)
- Glen Robinson (water polo) 2012 Olympic Athlete
- Mabel Pakenham-Walsh (artist)

== Former LMC Football Academy Students ==
- Garry Hunter
- Ryan-Zico Black
- John Hardiker
- David Perkins (footballer)
- Paul Lloyd (footballer)
- Jonathan Smith (footballer, born 1986)
- Scott Davies (footballer, born 1987)
- Aaron Taylor (footballer)
- Niall Cowperthwaite
- Joe McGee
- Dan Parkinson
- Joe Mwasile
- Chris Doyle (footballer)
- Jack Kelleher
