= Jack Sampson =

English footballer

Personal information
- Full name: Jack Sampson
- Date of birth: 14 April 1993 (age 33)
- Place of birth: Wigan, England
- Position: Forward

Team information
- Current team: Chorley
- Number: 9

Youth career
- 2006–2008: Wigan Athletic
- 2008–2011: Bolton Wanderers

Senior career*
| Years | Team | Apps | (Gls) |
| 2011–2013 | Bolton Wanderers | 0 | (0) |
| 2012 | → Southend United (loan) | 9 | (0) |
| 2012 | → Accrington Stanley (loan) | 5 | (0) |
| 2013–2015 | Morecambe | 58 | (5) |
| 2015 | → Macclesfield Town (loan) | 4 | (2) |
| 2015–2017 | Macclesfield Town | 60 | (4) |
| 2017 | → Chorley (loan) | 16 | (6) |
| 2017–2020 | Southport | 106 | (33) |
| 2020–2022 | AFC Fylde | 28 | (1) |
| 2022– | Chorley | 121 | (28) |

International career
| 2011 | England U19 | 1 | (0) |
- * Club domestic league appearances and goals as of 12:15, 26 April 2026 (UTC)

Jack Sampson (born 14 April 1993) is an English professional footballer who plays as a forward for Chorley. Sampson played for Bolton Wanderers and for Morecambe. He has been capped at England Under-19 level.

== Career ==
=== Bolton Wanderers ===
Sampson came through the Wigan Athletic academy, before joining Bolton in 2008 and a number of other youth players. Around this time, Sampson was soon attracted a move away from Bolton Wanderers at age fifteen at the time after linked with a move to big clubs.

Sampson joined Southend United on loan for one month on 12 January 2012 after signing a new 18-month contract at Bolton. He was given the number 26 jersey for the duration of his loan period, and made his debut on 14 January when coming on as a late substitute for Elliot Benyon in Southend's 5–2 victory at Northampton Town, where he gained an assist. On 13 February the loan was extended for a further month. This loan was extended for another month on 12 March. Sampson was given the number 37 shirt for the Championship season.

On 11 October 2012, Sampson joined Accrington Stanley on a one-month loan deal to gain some more experience and to link up with former Bolton full back Leam Richardson who had been installed as manager that week. Despite Accringtons best efforts to keep him he returned to his parent club at the end of his loan spell in November 2012 after making 6 appearances to try and catch the eye of new manager Dougie Freedman who had been appointed during his absence.

Sampson was released by Bolton, along with several other youth players, at the end of the 2012–13 season.

=== Morecambe ===
On 25 July 2013, Sampson joined Morecambe on a two-year contract after being released by Bolton Wanderers.

Sampson made his Morecambe debut in the opening game of the season, in a 1–0 loss against Wycombe Wanderers. Sampson then played a role when he provided two assists, in a 2–0 win over Exeter City on 24 August 2013 and scored his first goal for the club on 7 September 2013, in a 3–1 win over Southend United. After the match, Manager Jim Bentley was impressed with Sampson's display at the start of the season and believed he deserved to score his first goal. His second goal later came on 5 October 2013, in a 4–3 win over Chesterfield. His fourth and fifth goal later came against Accrington Stanley on 26 October 2013 and Hartlepool United respectively. In his first season, Sampson was a first team regular and scored five times in forty-two appearances.

In his second season at Morecambe, Sampson made a good start when he provided an assist for one of the goals in the game, in a 4–0 win over Dagenham & Redbridge in the opening game of the season. However, Sampson struggled for first team opportunity behind Jack Redshaw, Kevin Ellison, Paul Mullin and Pádraig Amond before suffering a foot injury that kept him sidelined for a month.

With his first team opportunities limited at Morecambe, Sampson joined Macclesfield Town on loan until the end of the season. Two days after signing for Macclesfield Town, Sampson the made his Macclesfield Town debut, coming on as a substitute for Waide Fairhurst in the 84th minute, in a 0–0 draw against Bristol Rovers. Sampson scored his first goals in the next game, in a 2–2 draw against FC Halifax Town on 3 April 2015. After making four appearances and scoring times, Sampson returned to his parent club and was released by the club at the end of the 2014–15 season.

=== Macclesfield Town ===
In June 2015, Sampson rejoined Macclesfield Town on a permanent deal.

=== Southport ===
On 8 June 2017, Sampson joined Southport, on a free transfer from Macclesfield Town, on an initial 2 year deal and became a figurehead of Southport's attack as well as fans favourite.

Scoring nine times in his first year with Southport, it was Sampson' second season that proved to be the then 26-year-old's most productive campaign, bagging 16 goals in 33 games.

Southport Manager Liam Watson said: "Jack is an integral part of Southport Football Club, his attitude is brilliant and you can see why the supporters have taken him to their hearts. He gives everything out on the pitch and never refuses when asked to carry out media or community activity."

Sampson was awarded during his time at Southport, with the Managers' Player Of The Season in 2018-19 and won the coveted Fans' Player of the Season in 2017-18.

Samson scoring 33 times in 106 games for Southport before joining AFC Fylde in October 2020.

=== AFC Fylde ===
On 28 October 2020, he joined AFC Fylde, on a one-year deal with the option for a one-year extension.

=== Chorley ===
On 19 February 2022, Sampson returned to Chorley having spent time with the club on loan in the past.

== International career ==
In September 2011, Sampson received a call-up by the England U19 squad.

== Career statistics ==
As of match played 26 December 2017

Appearances and goals by club, season and competition
| Club | Season | League | | | FA Cup | | League Cup | | Other | | Total | |
| Club | Season | Division | Apps | Goals | Apps | Goals | Apps | Goals | Apps | Goals | Apps | Goals |
|---|---|---|---|---|---|---|---|---|---|---|---|---|
| Southend United (loan) | 2011–12 | League Two | 9 | 0 | 0 | 0 | 0 | 0 | 0 | 0 | 9 | 0 |
| Accrington Stanley (loan) | 2012–13 | League Two | 5 | 0 | 1 | 0 | 0 | 0 | 0 | 0 | 6 | 0 |
| Morecambe | 2013–14 | League Two | 42 | 5 | 1 | 0 | 2 | 0 | 1 (Note: Appearances in the Football League Trophy) | 0 | 46 | 5 |
| Morecambe | 2014–15 | League Two | 16 | 0 | 1 | 0 | 0 | 0 | 2 | 0 | 19 | 0 |
| Morecambe | Morecambe total | | 58 | 5 | 2 | 0 | 2 | 0 | 3 | 0 | 65 | 5 |
| Macclesfield Town (loan) | 2014–15 | Conference Premier | 4 | 2 | — | | — | | 0 | 0 | 4 | 2 |
| Macclesfield Town | 2015–16 | National League | 39 | 3 | 1 | 0 | — | | 4 (Note: Appearances in the FA Trophy) | 1 | 44 | 4 |
| Macclesfield Town | 2016–17 | National League | 21 | 1 | 3 | 0 | — | | 3 | 1 | 27 | 2 |
| Macclesfield Town | Macclesfield total | | 60 | 4 | 4 | 0 | 0 | 0 | 7 | 2 | 71 | 6 |
| Chorley (loan) | 2016–17 | National League North | 16 | 6 | 0 | 0 | — | | 0 | 0 | 16 | 6 |
| Southport | 2017–18 | National League North | 17 | 3 | 0 | 0 | — | | 0 | 0 | 17 | 3 |
| Career total | | | 169 | 20 | 7 | 0 | 2 | 0 | 10 | 2 | 188 | 22 |
