= Lancaster College =

Lancaster College may refer to:

- Lancaster and Morecambe College, a further education college between Lancaster and Morecambe, Lancashire, England
- Lancaster Bible College, a private college in Lancaster, Pennsylvania
- Lancaster College (fictional), a fictional Oxford college in the film Incense for the Damned

== See also ==
- Lancaster University
