= Ryan Williams (footballer, born 1991) =

English footballer (born 1991)

Personal information
- Full name: Ryan Anthony Williams
- Date of birth: 8 April 1991 (age 35)
- Place of birth: Birkenhead, England
- Height: 1.73 m (5 ft 8 in)
- Position: Midfielder

Team information
- Current team: Detroit City
- Number: 6

Youth career
- 2002–2004: Tranmere Rovers
- 2005–2008: Chester City

Senior career*
Years	Team	Apps	(Gls)
2008–2009	Chester City	0	(0)
2009–2011	Colwyn Bay	10	(1)
2010–2011	→ Llandudno (loan)	16	(7)
2011–2012	Rhyl	35	(16)
2013–2015	Morecambe	53	(5)
2015–2016	Brentford	0	(0)
2016	Inverness Caledonian Thistle	8	(0)
2016–2017	Ottawa Fury	34	(7)
2018	Paysandu	1	(0)
2018–2019	Tranmere Rovers	0	(0)
2019	Hartford Athletic	26	(4)
2020	AFC Eskilstuna	13	(1)
2022–2023	AFC Eskilstuna	37	(0)
2024–	Detroit City	68	(1)

International career
2010	England Futsal	1	(0)
- * Club domestic league appearances and goals as of 4 November 2026

Ryan Anthony Williams (born 8 April 1991) is an English professional footballer who plays as a midfielder for Detroit City. After beginning his career at Chester City, Williams came to prominence with Morecambe and built a reputation as a free kick specialist. He later played in Scotland, Canada, Brazil, the United States and won an international futsal cap for England.

== Career ==
=== Chester City ===
Born in Birkenhead, Williams came through the youth ranks at League Two club Chester City and a transfer embargo saw him and other youngsters promoted to the club's first team during the 2008–09 season at age 17. He was an unused substitute in seven matches between September and December 2008 and made his senior debut for the club in a 7–0 Cheshire Senior Cup semi-final defeat to Crewe Alexandra on 20 January 2009, but he tore ankle ligaments on the stroke of half time and failed to recover before the Seals' relegation at the end of the season.

=== Non-league football ===
Williams signed for Northern Premier League First Division North club Colwyn Bay in late 2009. He helped the team achieve promotion to the Premier Division and moved to sign for Cymru Alliance club Llandudno on loan during the 2010–11 season, where his performances won him the club's Player of the Year award and a place in the league's Team of the Year. Williams transferred to fellow Cymru Alliance club Rhyl in July 2011 and was again voted into the Cymru Alliance Team of the Year at the end of the 2011–12 season. He departed Rhyl midway through the 2012–13 season.

=== Morecambe ===
Williams began training with League Two club Morecambe in July 2012, but was not offered a contract due to financial constraints. After the departure of Joe Mwasile on loan, funds were made available for Williams to be offered a short-term contract with the Shrimps in October 2012. International clearance problems held up the signing and he finally joined the club on 10 January 2013. Williams made his Football League debut in a match versus Plymouth Argyle five days later, coming on as a 68th-minute substitute for Gary McDonald. He crowned his day with a long-range goal in the 80th minute, though the Shrimps would lose 2–1. He scored his second goal in three games versus Dagenham & Redbridge two weeks later, this time scoring a late winner in a 2–1 victory. A first start versus York City on 2 February and Man of the Match performances later in the month versus Exeter City and Aldershot Town saw Williams sign a new contract running until the end of the 2013–14 season. Williams made 16 appearances and scored two goals during the second half of the 2012–13 season.

Williams was a regular starter during the 2013–14 season and got his campaign off to a flyer, netting long range goals with a free kick in a League Cup first round victory over Wolverhampton Wanderers and a 25-yard strike in a league draw with Torquay United. His performances saw him sign a new one-year contract extension in February 2014. Williams made 29 appearances and scored four goals during his first full season of league football and won Morecambe's Goal of the Season award. Williams began the 2014–15 season alternating between a starting berth and a place on the bench and missed the final two months of the season after undergoing surgery on a hernia problem. He finished the season with 16 appearances and no goals. Williams was released in May 2015 after making 61 appearances and scoring five goals during his two-and-a-half year spell at the Globe Arena.

=== Brentford ===
On 11 June 2015, Williams signed a one-year deal with Championship club Brentford, with the option for a further year. His only appearance for the Bees came with a start in a 4–0 League Cup first round defeat to Oxford United on 11 August. On 1 February 2016 and having failed to win a call into the squad in over four months, Williams' contract was cancelled by mutual consent. Get West London later reported that Williams "was a set-piece expert, but was never going to get in the first team and (Brentford) turned him into a set-pieces coach".

=== Inverness Caledonian Thistle ===
On 1 February 2016, Williams joined Scottish Premiership club Inverness Caledonian Thistle on a contract until the end of the 2015–16 season. He made eight substitute appearances and was not offered a new contract at the end of the season.

=== Ottawa Fury ===
On 19 July 2016, Williams moved to Canada to join North American Soccer League club Ottawa Fury FC. He made 18 appearances and scored four goals during the remainder of the 2016 season and was named as the Fans' Player of the Year. After making 20 appearances and scoring five goals during the 2017 United Soccer League season, Williams departed the club. He made 38 appearances and scored 9 goals during his time at the TD Place Stadium.

=== Paysandu ===
On 5 February 2018, it was announced that Williams had moved to Brazil to join Campeonato Brasileiro Série B club Paysandu on a three-month contract. He was unable to be registered until 23 March and made his only appearance for the club as a 75th-minute substitute for Pedro Carmona in a 1–1 draw with São Bento on 19 May. In mid-June 2018, it was announced that Williams' contract had been terminated early due to personal problems.

=== Tranmere Rovers ===
On 13 September 2018, Williams joined League Two club Tranmere Rovers on a short-term contract. He made just two EFL Trophy appearances before departing Prenton Park on 14 January 2019.

=== Hartford Athletic ===
On 21 February 2019, Williams moved to the United States to join USL Championship club Hartford Athletic.

=== AFC Eskilstuna ===
On 26 August 2020, Williams joined Swedish Superettan side AFC Eskilstuna. His lone goal for the club came on 16 October 2020 in a 3–2 loss against Akropolis IF. In March 2022, he rejoined the club on a deal until the end of the year.

=== Detroit City ===
Williams returned to the United States in March 2024, signing with USL Championship side Detroit City ahead of their 2024 season, and signed a new one-year contract with them for the 2025 season.

== Futsal ==
Williams played futsal for Tranmere Victoria and Liverpool and was named in the England squad for the 2010 FA Futsal Four Nations Tournament. He made his debut in the final of the tournament, a 3–2 defeat to Turkey.

== Personal life ==
After dropping out of professional football in 2009, Williams studied to become a personal trainer, eventually launching Roqstar Fitness, based in New Brighton.

== Career statistics ==
As of 17 April 2019

Appearances and goals by club, season and competition
Club	Season	League			Domestic Cup (Note: Includes the Welsh Cup, FA Cup, and Canadian Championship)		League Cup (Note: All appearances in the Football League Cup)		Continental		Other		Total	
Club	Season	Division	Apps	Goals	Apps	Goals	Apps	Goals	Apps	Goals	Apps	Goals	Apps	Goals
Chester City	2008–09	League Two	0	0	0	0	0	0	–		1 (Note: Appearance in Cheshire Senior Cup)	0	1	0
Colwyn Bay	2009–10	NPL Division One	10	1			–		–				10+	1+
Colwyn Bay	2010–11	NPL Premier Division	0	0	0	0	–		–		0	0	0	0
Colwyn Bay	2011–12	Conference North	0	0			–		–				0+	0+
Colwyn Bay	Total		10	1			0	0	0	0			10+	1+
Llandudno (loan)	2010–11	Cymru Alliance	16	7			–		–		–		16+	7+
Rhyl	2011–12	Cymru Alliance	35	16	1+	2+	–		–		–		36+	18+
Morecambe	2012–13	League Two	16	2	0	0	0	0	–		–		16	2
Morecambe	2013–14	League Two	25	3	1	0	2	1	–		1 (Note: Appearances in the EFL Trophy)	0	29	4
Morecambe	2014–15	League Two	12	0	1	0	1	0	–		2	0	16	0
Morecambe	Total		53	5	2	0	3	1	0	0	3	0	45	4
Brentford	2015–16	Championship	0	0	0	0	1	0	–		–		1	0
Inverness Caledonian Thistle	2015–16	Scottish Premiership	8	0	0	0	0	0	0	0	–		8	0
Ottawa Fury FC	2016	NASL	18	4	0	0	–		–		–		18	4
Ottawa Fury FC	2017	USL	16	3	4	2	–		–		–		20	5
Ottawa Fury FC	Total		34	7	4	2	0	0	0	0	0	0	38	9
Paysandu	2018	Série B	1	0	0	0	0	0	–		0	0	1	0
Tranmere Rovers	2018–19	League Two	0	0	0	0	0	0	–		2	0	2	0
Hartford Athletic	2019	USL Championship	26	4	1	0	–		–		0	0	27	4
AFC Eskilstuna	2020	Superettan	13	1	0	0	–		–		0	0	13	1
Career total			196	41	8+	4+	4	1	0	0	6+	0+	214+	46+

== Honours ==
- Llandudno Player of the Year (1): 2010–11
- Cymru Alliance Team of the Year (2): 2010–11, 2011–12
- Ottawa Fury Fans' Player of the Year (1): 2016
