= Pádraig Amond =

Irish footballer (born 1988)

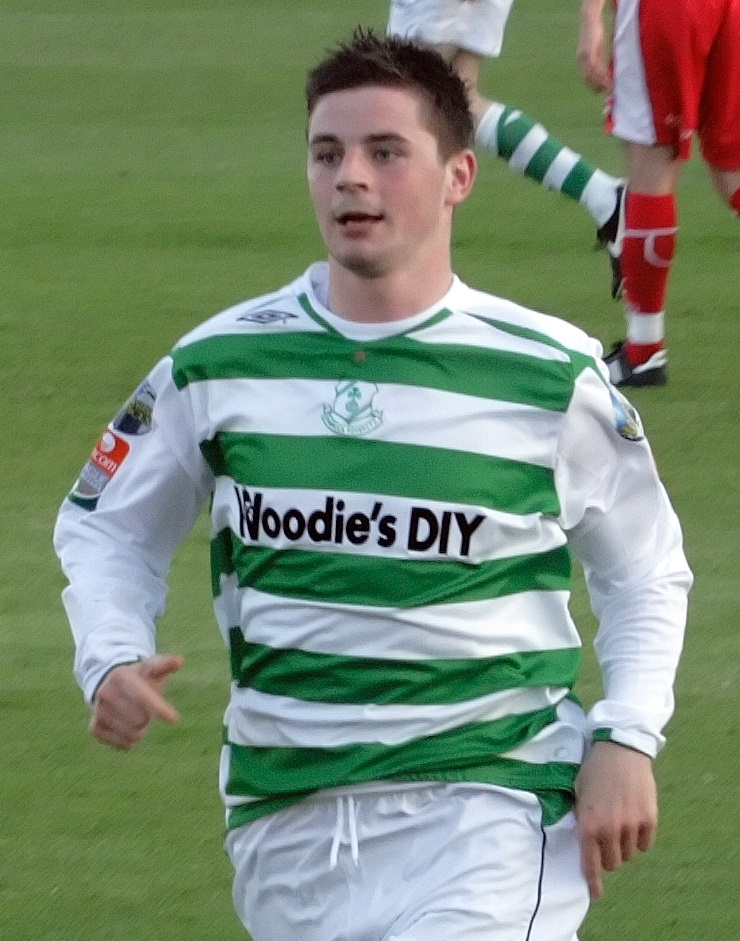
- Amond after scoring for Shamrock Rovers in 2008

Personal information
- Full name: Pádraig Amond
- Date of birth: 15 April 1988 (age 38)
- Place of birth: Carlow, Ireland
- Height: 1.80 m (5 ft 11 in)
- Position: Striker

Team information
- Current team: Waterford
- Number: 9

Youth career
- 1999–2006: Shamrock Rovers

Senior career*
Years	Team	Apps	(Gls)
2006–2009	Shamrock Rovers	63	(15)
2007	→ Kildare County (loan)	14	(5)
2010	Sligo Rovers	27	(17)
2010–2012	Paços de Ferreira	17	(0)
2011–2012	→ Accrington Stanley (loan)	42	(7)
2012–2013	Accrington Stanley	36	(9)
2013–2015	Morecambe	82	(19)
2015–2016	Grimsby Town	40	(30)
2016–2017	Hartlepool United	50	(15)
2017–2022	Newport County	162	(41)
2021–2022	→ Exeter City (loan)	26	(3)
2022–2024	Woking	72	(17)
2024–	Waterford	108	(43)

International career
2008	Republic of Ireland U21	4	(0)
- * Club domestic league appearances and goals as of 30 October 2026 (UTC)

Pádraig Amond (born 15 April 1988) is an Irish professional footballer who plays as a striker for League of Ireland Premier Division club Waterford.

He began his career in his native Ireland with Shamrock Rovers, progressing through the club's youth academy before making his first-team debut in 2006. In his first season, he helped the team achieve promotion to the League of Ireland Premier Division. After a spell on loan to Kildare County, Amond established himself in the first-team and was named the club's Young Player of the Year in 2008. He joined Sligo Rovers in 2010, scoring 23 goals in his only season and winning both the League of Ireland Cup and the FAI Cup.

Amond signed for Portuguese club Paços de Ferreira in 2010 but never made a first-team start for the team and moved to English League Two club Accrington Stanley, initially on loan, after less than a year. He joined Morecambe in 2013, scoring 21 goals in all competitions during a two-year spell before being released, joining Grimsby Town. At Grimsby, he enjoyed the most prolific season of his career by scoring 30 league goals in the National League, as he helped the team achieve promotion to the English Football League after winning the 2016 National League play-off final. He left the club after one season to join Hartlepool United but suffered relegation to the National League in 2017.

Following a spell with Hartlepool, Amond enjoyed a four-year stint with Newport County for which he collated over 200 appearances before making the move to National League, Woking in July 2022. He has represented Ireland at under-21 level, winning four caps in 2008.

== Career ==
=== Carlow GAA ===
Amond represented his native county of Carlow at hurling. In 2005, he led the team to victory in the All-Ireland Minor B Hurling Championship and the following year, lining out at full forward Amond scored 6 goals & 9 points in the 2006 All-Ireland Minor Hurling Championship, on Carlow's run to the Leinster final at Croke Park. It was Carlow's first Leinster Minor Hurling final appearance in 54 years.

In 2006, he signed his first professional contract with Shamrock Rovers and, in order to keep playing for Carlow, he was left out of team photos and listed under a false name, Brendan Amond, in the matchday programmes to avoid being spotted. The ruse was eventually discovered when his picture appeared in a newspaper following a victory. Having long resisted advice from coaches to focus on football he eventually gave up hurling after discussions with manager Pat Scully.

=== Shamrock Rovers ===
Amond joined Shamrock Rovers in 1999, at the age of 10, and progressed through the schoolboy ranks of the club. He was part of the team that were champions of the League of Ireland First Division in the 2006 season, being promoted to the League of Ireland Premier Division. He was promoted to the senior squad at the start of the season, making his League of Ireland debut as a substitute against Athlone Town on 16 March 2006. He scored his only goal against Finn Harps in September 2006. He made ten appearances, eight from the bench, for the whole season.

Amond joined Kildare County on a season-long loan for the 2007 season. He scored twice on 8 April 2007 in what was Kildare County's first victory of the season in a 2–2 draw against Wexford Youths, he got their first within four minutes after goalkeeper Shane Dunphy fumbled a Gary Walsh corner-kick leaving Amond to shoot from close range; in the 90th minute Amond scored an equalising penalty. He became the first opposition player to score at Athlone Town's new stadium at Lissywollen in the League of Ireland First Division on 16 April 2007, in a 2–0 away win. His final goal while on his loan spell came on 27 April 2007 against Kilkenny City. He scored five goals for Kildare before being recalled by Shamrock Rovers.

Following his return, Amond scored Shamrock Rovers' 4000th league goal in a 4–0 win over Galway United on 14 September 2007. He made six league appearances in the 2007 season along with an appearance in the 2007 League of Ireland Cup. He scored his first goal of the 2008 season on 18 April and followed it with another three weeks later. On 8 June 2008, he scored the first goal of a 2–1 victory against Sligo Rovers in the third round of the 2008 FAI Cup. Amond finished as Shamrock Rovers' top goalscorer with nine league goals in the 2008 season and won the club's Young Player of the Year award.

Amond made his first appearance for the 2009 season on 3 April, in the fifth match of the season, during a 2–2 draw with Drogheda United. On 10 May 2009, he scored the first two goals within 4 minutes, in a 3–0 win against Sligo Rovers. His final league goal for the club came on 2 October 2009 with the winner in the 1–0 victory over Bohemians. He made twenty league appearances and scored four goals in the 2009 season.

=== Sligo Rovers ===
In December 2009, he signed for Sligo Rovers. Amond played in the 2009–10 Setanta Sports Cup, scoring the third goal in the 86th minute on his competitive debut for Sligo, in a 3–0 win over Cliftonville. He also played in both legs of the semi-final against St Patrick's Athletic, where they lost 6–2 on aggregate.

Amond played twice in the early rounds of Rovers' 2010 FAI Cup triumph. He also played three matches and scored five goals in the 2010 League of Ireland Cup, including a brace in a 6–0 victory over Ulster Senior League team Letterkenny Rovers in the second round of the cup on 11 May 2010. On 1 June 2010, he scored Sligo's fourth goal in a 4–1 victory over St Patrick's Athletic, shooting past their keeper Dan Connor to confirm a place in the last four. On 17 August 2010, Amond continued his goal scoring run with a brace in a 2–1 victory against his former club Shamrock Rovers in the semi-finals. Sligo Rovers would go on to lift both cup tournaments after Amond had left the club.

=== Paços de Ferreira ===
Amond was subject of a bid from Portuguese Primeira Liga club Paços de Ferreira in August 2010, which was rejected by Sligo Rovers. However, in September 2010 the club made an improved offer, which Sligo accepted and Amond signed on a three-year contract for an undisclosed fee. He made his debut as a substitute in a home match against Braga on 19 September, helping his team haul back a two-goal deficit to draw the match 2–2. He also made one appearance in the 2010–11 Taça de Portugal, coming on as a substitute in the 87th minute during the 3–1 victory against São João de Vêr. On 10 November 2010, he made his second start and scored his first goal for Paços de Ferreira against Leixões in the Portuguese League Cup.

Amond made a total of 17 league appearances for Paços, but with all of them coming from the substitutes' bench, it meant that he played a total of just under 300 minutes. In his final appearance for the club, he set up his team's equaliser in a 3–3 draw away to FC Porto.

=== Accrington Stanley ===
On 26 August 2011, Amond signed for English League Two club Accrington Stanley on a season-long loan deal. Prior to signing, he had spent a week on trial with League One club Sheffield Wednesday. Amond scored his first goal for Accrington in a 3–2 Football League Trophy win against Carlisle United when he came off the bench in the 70th minute and scored an equaliser four minutes from time. During his ninth appearance, he scored his first league goal for the club, a 67th-minute header from close range to equalise 2–2 against Plymouth Argyle.

After a successful loan spell the previous season, on 13 August 2012, Amond signed a one-year deal with Accrington Stanley. He scored his first goal of the 2012–13 campaign in a 2–0 win at home to Port Vale on 21 August 2012, a penalty kick in the 43rd minute after his strike partner Karl Sheppard was brought down by the Vale goalkeeper. Amond had been struggling with groin, abductor and hip problems since January 2013, which limited him to brief substitute appearances from the bench until the beginning of April.

=== Morecambe ===
After leaving Accrington Stanley, Amond went on trial with Morecambe; he signed for Morecambe on 1 August 2013, on a free transfer after a successful trial period. On 31 August 2013 Amond scored his first goal for Morecambe in the 2–1 win against Plymouth Argyle, a left-footed volley from 15 yards out past Luke McCormick seven minutes from time to give Morecambe their first Football League win over Argyle. On 5 October 2013, he scored the winning goal as Morecambe came back from 3–0 down, when with only six minutes to go Amond headed home from the centre of the box striker Jack Sampson's left-wing cross, which flew past visiting keeper Tommy Lee to beat league leaders Chesterfield 4–3 at the Globe Arena. Amond won Morecambe's Golden Boot award for the 2013–14 season, he finished their top goal-scorer with 11 goals in all competitions.

Amond scored on the opening day of the 2014–15 season in a 3–0 win over Dagenham & Redbridge. Fellow striker Jack Sampson was brought down in the box, Amond then dispatched the penalty to put them 2–0 ahead after 54 minutes. On 2 September 2014, Amond scored twice in the first round of the Football League Trophy. He scored an equaliser in the 28th minute and made it 3–1 eight minutes from time when he tapped in from close range after Chris Maxwell had saved Jack Sampson's close range effort. On 11 April 2015, Amond's eighth and final league goal of the campaign came in the 3–1 win over Portsmouth in the 92nd minute, scoring from 18 yards.

In May 2015, after the end of the 2014–15 season, Amond was released by Morecambe.

=== Grimsby Town ===
On 1 July 2015, Amond signed for National League club Grimsby Town on a one-year contract. Grimsby fended off interest from League of Ireland Premier Division champions Dundalk, NIFL Premiership club Linfield as well as a number of English clubs in League Two to sign Amond. On 8 August 2015, he scored a debut opening goal for Grimsby in the 43rd minute during a 2–2 draw against Kidderminster Harriers. Amond scored a brace in a 4–1 home win against Bromley, scoring the opener after three minutes when Nathan Arnold chested a cross into Amond's path who finished past the keeper into the bottom corner; he scored the match's third goal on 25 minutes, Arnold's cross was headed back goalwards by Josh Gowling at the far post and Amond volleyed into the roof of the net. On 13 October 2015, Amond netted his first hat-trick in English football and finished with 4 goals in a 7–0 victory against FC Halifax Town.

On 24 October 2015, Amond scored two goals in a 4–1 win against National League North team Harrogate Town in the fourth round qualifier of the FA Cup. His first came on 34 minutes when Conor Townsend beat three defenders, breaking into the box and playing the ball across for Amond to drive home; he scored the fourth goal for Grimsby in the 71st minute when substitute Jon-Paul Pittman played a one-two with Amond who found space in the box and side-footed home; his first goals in FA Cup competition. Amond came off the bench to score twice in the first round of the FA Cup against National League South team St Albans City, after replacing his usual strike partner Omar Bogle in the 43rd minute due to an injury; he scored the second goal of the match in the 45th minute latching onto a header back to the goalkeeper, he scored his second and the fifth goal in the 93rd minute, a header from the left side of the box.

Amond played in Grimsby's 3–1 victory over Forest Green Rovers in the 2016 National League play-off final at Wembley Stadium, seeing Grimsby promoted to League Two after a six-year absence from the Football League. His efforts over the season earned him a place in the 2015–16 National League Team of the Year and named Grimsby's Player of the Year.

=== Hartlepool United ===
Amond was offered a one-year extension with Grimsby following the club's promotion but, on 20 June 2016, he signed for League Two club Hartlepool United on a two-year contract. He made his debut for the club on the opening day of the 2016–17 season in a 1–1 draw with Colchester United, scoring his first goal in his fourth appearance during a 3–3 draw with Crewe Alexandra on 16 August 2016. He went on to finish the season as the club's top goalscorer, with 14 goals in all competitions, including a brace against his former team Grimsby during a 3–0 victory on 1 October 2016. Hartlepool suffered relegation from the Football League on the final day of the 2016–17 season.

On the first day of pre-season training the following season, Amond placed a transfer request which was denied and he was informed by the club that he would not be allowed to leave. Hartlepool also rejected an offer from League Two club Newport County and verbally offered Amond a new contract, although no official deal was ever offered to him. Amond played in all four of Hartlepool's opening matches in the National League, scoring a penalty during a 2–1 defeat to Maidenhead United, but was accused by manager Craig Harrison of making himself unavailable for selection for a match against Bromley on 19 August in an attempt to force a transfer away from the club. Amond refuted the claims, stating that he had never refused to play and that the situation had left him "hating football". Hartlepool decided to back down from their previous stance regarding a transfer and manager Harrison telephoned Newport manager Michael Flynn to offer a move for Amond.

=== Newport County ===
==== 2017–18 season ====
On 23 August 2017, Amond signed for League Two club Newport County on a two-year deal, with the option of a third, for an undisclosed fee. Newport manager Flynn stated that Amond had been a "key target" during the summer transfer window. The pair had met in the closing stages of the previous season as substitutes on opposing sides when Newport played Hartlepool and Flynn had praised Amond, telling him that if "he was the manager, [Amond] would be playing every week." The club was able to complete the deal using money earned from their EFL Cup tie against Championship side Leeds United. He made his debut on 26 August 2017 in a League Two match against Chesterfield, scoring the fourth goal in a 4–1 win.

On 27 January 2018, Amond scored against Premier League side Tottenham Hotspur in the third round of the FA Cup during a 1–1 draw at Rodney Parade. Tottenham won the replay 2–0. After scoring in the final match of the season, a 1–1 draw with Carlisle United, Amond finished as Newport's top goalscorer for the 2017–18 season with fourteen goals in all competitions.

==== 2018–19 season ====
On 3 January 2019, Amond signed a contract extension at Newport until the end of the 2019–20 season. Three days later, Amond scored the winning goal, a penalty, against Premier League side Leicester City in the FA Cup 3rd round in a 2–1 victory. On 5 February 2019, Amond scored the second goal in Newport's 2–0 FA Cup fourth round replay win against Championship club Middlesbrough. In the following round, Amond scored Newport's goal in their 4–1 defeat against reigning Premier League champions Manchester City. Amond played in the 2019 EFL League Two play-off final at Wembley Stadium where Newport lost to Tranmere Rovers, 1–0. Amond finished as Newport's top goalscorer for the 2018–19 season with twenty-four goals in all competitions and he was selected as the Newport County Player of the Year.

==== 2019–20 season ====
In November 2019 Amond further extended his contract with Newport until June 2022. Amond was again top scorer for Newport during the 2019–20 season with 13 goals in all competitions. The season was terminated with ten league matches unplayed due to the Coronavirus pandemic.

==== 2020–21 season ====
On 22 September 2020, Amond scored the third Newport County goal when they beat Championship club Watford 3–1 at home in the third round of the EFL Cup. The win meant the club had reached the fourth round of the EFL Cup for the first time in the club's history. Newport were drawn at home to Premier League club Newcastle United and lost on penalties after drawing 1–1. Amond was again top scorer for Newport during the 2020–21 with nine goals in all competitions. Amond played for Newport in the League Two play-off final at Wembley Stadium on 31 May 2021 which Newport lost to Morecambe, 1–0 after a 107th-minute penalty. Amond was released by Newport County at the end of the 2021–22 season.

==== Exeter City (loan) ====
On 10 August 2021, Amond joined League Two side Exeter City on loan for the remainder of the 2021–22 season. He made his debut for Exeter on 15 August 2021 as a second-half substitute in the 3–0 League Two defeat to Leyton Orient. Amond scored his first two goals for Exeter in the 5-3 EFL Trophy win against Bristol Rovers on 10 November 2021. In May 2022 Amond was part of the Exeter city squad that finished second in League Two, gaining automatic promotion to League One.

=== Woking ===
On 22 June 2022, Amond agreed to join National League side Woking ahead of his release from Newport, signing a two-year deal. Amond made his debut in a 2–0 loss away to York City in the first game of the season, a week later he would make his home debut in a 2–0 win against Dagenham and Redbridge. On 15 October 2022, he scored his first Woking goal from a direct free kick in a 2–1 win against Southend United in the FA Cup. At the end of the 2022–23 season, Amond was named as the club's Player of the Year after scoring 13 goals and registering 11 assists.

On 23 January 2024, Amond had his contract terminated to allow him to return to the Republic of Ireland to play out the remainder of his career closer to his family.

=== Waterford ===
==== 2024 season ====
On 26 January 2024, Amond signed for League of Ireland Premier Division club Waterford on a two-year contract. Amond proved an important figure in the Blues return to the Premier Division in 2024, netting 14 goals and providing 2 assists, as he ended the campaign as joint Top Goal scorer in the league. Waterford's talisman started all 36 league games and was only substituted off twice, totalling 2872 minutes played, the most for any outfield player. Amond was voted League of Ireland Player of the Month May 2024. At the end of year awards, Padraig was voted on the PFAI Team of the Year for 2024 along with being one of 3 players shortlisted for 2024 PFAI Players' Player of the Year. He was voted as the club's Player of the Year for 2024.

==== 2025 season ====
He was named club captain for the 2025 season. On 27 June 2025, he made his 800th career appearance, in a 1–0 defeat to Shamrock Rovers at Tallaght Stadium. Amond scored 14 goals again in 2025, beating Mason Melia to the golden boot by 1 goal. He was also named in the PFAI Team of the Year for the second year running.

==== 2026 season ====
On 4 February 2026, Amond signed a new contract with the club, running until the end of the 2027 season. On 12 June 2026, he scored a hat-trick in a 4–0 win at home to Sligo Rovers, in what was just the second victory his side had recorded all season. Amond finished the season with 15 league goals, missing out becoming the league's top goalscorer for the third consecutive season by one goal to his strike partner Tommy Lonergan. On 8 November 2026, he captained his side in the 2026 FAI Cup final as they were defeated 1–0 by Derry City at the Aviva Stadium.

== International career ==
Amond earned his first cap for the Republic of Ireland U21 team against Austria on 19 August 2008. He made his second appearance for the team in Bulgaria and his first start against Portugal. He earned his fourth cap in October 2008 in Lithuania.

He received his first call-up to the senior national team in March 2019, but was ultimately never capped at that level.

== Personal life ==
Amond writes articles as a sports columnist for the local newspaper in his native county of Carlow, The Nationalist.

Amond was a National Citizen Service Ambassador for the 2016–17 season, joining 40 footballers from across the country in pledging their support for the youth empowerment scheme. He has a brother named Aaron.

== Career statistics ==
As of match played on 8 November 2026

Appearances and goals by club, season and competition
Club	Season	League			National cup (Note: Includes FAI Cup, Taça de Portugal, FA Cup)		League cup (Note: Includes League of Ireland Cup, Taça da Liga, EFL Cup)		Other		Total	
Club	Season	Division	Apps	Goals	Apps	Goals	Apps	Goals	Apps	Goals	Apps	Goals
Shamrock Rovers	2006	LOI First Division	10	1	3	0	2	0	—		15	1
Shamrock Rovers	2007	LOI Premier Division	6	1	0	0	1	0	—		7	1
Shamrock Rovers	2008	LOI Premier Division	27	9	2	1	1	0	—		30	10
Shamrock Rovers	2009	LOI Premier Division	20	4	1	0	3	1	—		24	5
Shamrock Rovers	Total		63	15	6	1	7	1	—		76	17
Kildare County (loan)	2007	LOI First Division	14	5	—		—		—		14	5
Sligo Rovers	2010	LOI Premier Division	27	17	2	0	3	5	3 (Note: Appearances in Setanta Sports Cup)	1	35	23
Paços de Ferreira	2010–11	Primeira Liga	17	0	1	0	2	1	—		20	1
Accrington Stanley (loan)	2011–12	League Two	42	7	1	0	0	0	2 (Note: Appearances in EFL Trophy)	1	45	8
Accrington Stanley	2012–13	League Two	36	9	3	0	0	0	0	0	39	9
Accrington Stanley	Total		78	16	4	0	0	0	2	1	84	17
Morecambe	2013–14	League Two	45	11	1	0	2	0	1	0	49	11
Morecambe	2014–15	League Two	37	8	1	0	1	0	2	2	41	10
Morecambe	Total		82	19	2	0	3	0	3	2	90	21
Grimsby Town	2015–16	National League	40	30	4	4	—		7 (Note: Four appearances and two goals in FA Trophy, three appearances and one goal in National League play-offs)	3	51	37
Hartlepool United	2016–17	League Two	46	14	2	0	1	0	0	0	49	14
Hartlepool United	2017–18	National League	4	1	—		—		—		4	1
Hartlepool United	Total		50	15	2	0	1	0	0	0	53	15
Newport County	2017–18	League Two	43	13	5	1	0	0	3	0	51	14
Newport County	2018–19	League Two	45	14	7	5	2	2	5 (Note: Two appearances and one goal in EFL Trophy, three appearances and one goal in EFL League Two play-offs)	2	59	23
Newport County	2019–20	League Two	33	8	4	3	2	1	3	1	42	13
Newport County	2020–21	League Two	41	6	3	1	4	1	6 (Note: Three appearances and one goal in EFL Trophy, three appearances in EFL League Two play-offs)	1	54	9
Newport County	2021–22	League Two	0	0	—		—		—		0	0
Newport County	Total		162	41	19	10	8	4	17	4	206	59
Exeter City (loan)	2021–22	League Two	26	3	1	0	0	0	3	2	30	5
Woking	2022–23	National League	45	12	2	1	—		2 (Note: One appearance FA Trophy and one in National League play-offs)	0	49	13
Woking	2023–24	National League	27	5	3	1	—		1 (Note: Appearance(s) in FA Trophy)	0	31	6
Woking	Total		72	17	5	2	—		3	0	80	19
Waterford	2024	LOI Premier Division	36	14	2	2	—		0	0	38	16
Waterford	2025	LOI Premier Division	36	14	2	1	—		2 (Note: 1 appearance, 1 goal in the Munster Senior Cup; 1 appearance in the 2025 League of Ireland Premier Division Promotion/Relegation play-off)	1	40	16
Waterford	2026	LOI Premier Division	36	15	5	3	—		0	0	41	18
Waterford	Total		108	43	9	6	—		2	1	119	50
Career total			739	221	55	23	24	11	40	14	858	269

== Honours ==
Shamrock Rovers

- League of Ireland First Division: 2006

Sligo Rovers FC

- FAI Cup: 2010
- League of Ireland Cup: 2010

Paços de Ferreira

- Portuguese League Cup runner-up: 2010–11

Grimsby Town

- National League play-offs: 2016
- FA Trophy runner-up: 2015–16

Exeter City

- EFL League Two second-place promotion: 2021–22

Individual

- Shamrock Rovers Young Player of the Year: 2008
- PFAI Premier Division Team of the Year (3): 2010, 2024, 2025
- League of Ireland Cup Top Scorer: 2010
- Accrington Stanley Player of the Year: 2011–12
- Grimsby Town Player of the Year: 2015–16
- National League Team of the Year: 2015–16
- Newport County Player of the Year: 2018–19
- FA Cup Golden Ball: 2018–19
- Woking Player of the Year: 2022–23
- League of Ireland Premier Division Top scorer (2): 2024, 2025
- Waterford Player of the Year: 2024
- League of Ireland Player of the Month (3): May 2024, July 2025, October 2026
