= Andrew Fleming (footballer) =

English footballer (born 1989)

Personal information
- Full name: Andrew Lee Fleming
- Date of birth: 18 February 1989 (age 37)
- Place of birth: Liverpool, England
- Height: 6 ft 1 in (1.85 m)
- Position: Midfielder

Youth career
- –2007: Wrexham

Senior career*
Years	Team	Apps	(Gls)
2007–2010	Wrexham	67	(1)
2010–2019	Morecambe	229	(18)
Total		296	(19)

International career
2009–2010	England C	2	(1)
- * Club domestic league appearances and goals

Andrew Lee Fleming (born 18 February 1989) is an English former footballer who played as a midfielder. Having begun his career with Wrexham, he is best known for his association with Morecambe, where he made over 200 appearances in League Two between 2010 and his retirement due to injury in 2019.

== Club career ==
=== Wrexham ===
Fleming made his debut for Wrexham as a substitute for Steve Evans on 21 January 2007 during a 1–1 draw with Darlington in League Two and made his first start on 18 February in a 0–0 draw with Chester City. During the 2008–09 season, under new manager Dean Saunders Fleming managed to claim a regular place in the first team and was rewarded with a contract extension.

=== Morecambe ===
Out of contract at the end of the 2009–10 season, Fleming left Wrexham to sign for Morecambe on 27 July 2010. He made his debut for the club in a 2–0 win over Coventry City in the Football League Cup, scoring both goals,

In July 2019, Fleming announced his retirement as a player, aged 31, due to a knee injury.

== International career ==
In May 2009, Fleming made his debut for the England C team in the 2007–09 International Challenge Trophy final, a 1–0 defeat against Belgium U21s. He played again on 26 May 2010, scoring once in the 2009–11 International Challenge Trophy match versus the Republic of Ireland, which they won 2–1.

== Career statistics ==
=== Club ===
As of match played 2 September 2017

Appearances and goals by club, season and competition
Club	Season	League			FA Cup		League Cup		Other		Total	
Club	Season	Division	Apps	Goals	Apps	Goals	Apps	Goals	Apps	Goals	Apps	Goals
Wrexham	2006–07	League Two	2	0	0	0	0	0	0	0	2	0
Wrexham	2007–08	League Two	4	0	0	0	0	0	0	0	4	0
Wrexham	2008–09	Conference Premier	24	0	0	0	~	~	2 (Note: Appearances in the Football League Trophy)	0	26	0
Wrexham	2009–10	Conference Premier	37	1	2	0	~	~	0	0	39	1
Wrexham	Subtotal		67	1	2	0	0	0	2	0	71	1
Morecambe	2010–11	League Two	30	2	0	0	2	2	0	0	32	4
Morecambe	2011–12	League Two	17	2	0	0	0	0	0	0	17	2
Morecambe	2012–13	League Two	32	5	3	1	2	1	2	0	39	7
Morecambe	2013–14	League Two	35	2	1	0	2	0	1	0	39	2
Morecambe	2014–15	League Two	35	2	1	0	1	0	1	0	38	2
Morecambe	2015–16	League Two	33	3	1	0	1	0	2	0	37	3
Morecambe	2016–17	League Two	30	2	1	0	2	0	2	0	35	2
Morecambe	2017–18	League Two	4	0	0	0	1	0	1	0	6	0
Morecambe	Subtotal		216	18	7	1	11	3	9	0	236	22
Career total			283	19	9	1	11	3	11	0	314	23
