= Jack Redshaw =

English footballer (born 1990)

Personal information
- Date of birth: 20 November 1990 (age 35)
- Place of birth: Salford, England
- Height: 5 ft 8 in (1.73 m)
- Position: Forward

Team information
- Current team: Hyde United

Youth career
- 1999–2008: Manchester City

Senior career*
| Years | Team | Apps | (Gls) |
| 2008–2010 | Manchester City | 0 | (0) |
| 2010–2011 | Rochdale | 2 | (0) |
| 2011 | Salford City | 24 | (12) |
| 2011–2012 | Altrincham | 13 | (6) |
| 2012–2015 | Morecambe | 120 | (36) |
| 2012 | → Altrincham (loan) | 4 | (1) |
| 2015–2017 | Blackpool | 36 | (7) |
| 2017 | → Rochdale (loan) | 1 | (0) |
| 2017–2019 | Salford City | 36 | (17) |
| 2019–2020 | FC Halifax Town | 15 | (3) |
| 2020–2021 | York City | 10 | (1) |
| 2021–2022 | Ashton United | 27 | (5) |
| 2021–2022 | → Chester (loan) | 11 | (2) |
| 2022– | Hyde United | 114 | (40) |
- * Club domestic league appearances and goals as of 12:00, 6 May 2025 (UTC)

Jack Redshaw (born 20 November 1990) is an English professional footballer who plays as a forward for Hyde United.

== Career ==
=== Rochdale ===
Redshaw was then in talks with Blackpool, but signed for Rochdale a few weeks later and was given the number 10 shirt. He made his debut as a late substitute for Rochdale on 14 August 2010 in the Football League One game against Brighton & Hove Albion at The Withdean Stadium.

=== Altrincham ===
Redshaw signed for Altrincham on 13 October 2011. He made his debut as a substitute against Vauxhall Motors. He scored twice for Altrincham in a friendly against a Manchester United XI. He also scored in a Cheshire cup game before returning briefly to former club Salford City for a Manchester Premier Cup game, in which he scored a hat-trick. On his return to Altrincham he scored in an FA Trophy defeat against FC United of Manchester before scoring his first league goals in a 4–2 victory over FC Halifax Town.

=== Morecambe ===
On 24 January 2012, he signed for Morecambe.

In August 2014 Morecambe accepted a bid for Redshaw from League One side Peterborough United but after having a medical and discussing personal terms Redshaw rejected the move.

=== Blackpool ===
He signed for Blackpool in 2015, spending two seasons with the club before being released in May 2017.

=== Salford City (second spell) ===
In July 2017 he returned to Salford City, signing a two-year contract. In June 2019 he was released by the club after the expiry of his contract.

=== FC Halifax Town ===
In November 2019 he signed for FC Halifax Town.

=== York City ===
On 12 August 2020, Redshaw signed for York City.

=== Ashton United ===
In the summer of 2021, Redshaw signed for Northern Premier League Premier Division side Ashton United on a free transfer.

==== Chester (loan) ====
On 24 September 2021, Redshaw joined National League North side Chester on an initial three-month loan deal. On 3 January, Redshaw returned to Ashton having scored two goals in thirteen appearances.

=== Hyde United ===
On 20 June 2022, Redshaw joined Hyde United from Ashton United

== Career statistics ==
As of 23 April 2022

Appearances and goals by club, season and competition
| Club | Season | League | | | FA Cup | | League Cup | | Other | | Total | |
| Club | Season | Division | Apps | Goals | Apps | Goals | Apps | Goals | Apps | Goals | Apps | Goals |
|---|---|---|---|---|---|---|---|---|---|---|---|---|
| Rochdale | 2010–11 | League One | 2 | 0 | 0 | 0 | 0 | 0 | 1 (Note: Appearances in the Football League Trophy) | 0 | 3 | 0 |
| Altrincham | 2011–12 | Conference North | 13 | 6 | 0 | 0 | — | | 0 | 0 | 13 | 6 |
| Morecambe | 2011–12 | League Two | 11 | 2 | 0 | 0 | 0 | 0 | 0 | 0 | 11 | 2 |
| Morecambe | 2012–13 | League Two | 40 | 15 | 2 | 0 | 1 | 0 | 2 | 1 | 45 | 16 |
| Morecambe | 2013–14 | League Two | 29 | 8 | 0 | 0 | 0 | 0 | 0 | 0 | 29 | 8 |
| Morecambe | 2014–15 | League Two | 40 | 11 | 1 | 0 | 1 | 0 | 2 | 1 | 44 | 12 |
| Morecambe | Total | | 120 | 36 | 3 | 0 | 2 | 0 | 4 | 2 | 129 | 38 |
| Altrincham (loan) | 2011–12 | Conference North | 4 | 1 | 0 | 0 | — | | 0 | 0 | 4 | 1 |
| Blackpool | 2015–16 | League One | 36 | 7 | 0 | 0 | 1 | 0 | 1 | 0 | 38 | 7 |
| Blackpool | 2016–17 | League Two | 0 | 0 | 0 | 0 | 0 | 0 | 2 (Note: Appearances in the EFL Trophy) | 0 | 2 | 0 |
| Blackpool | Total | | 36 | 7 | 0 | 0 | 1 | 0 | 3 | 0 | 40 | 7 |
| Rochdale (loan) | 2016–17 | League One | 1 | 0 | 1 | 0 | 0 | 0 | 0 | 0 | 2 | 0 |
| Salford City | 2017–18 | National League North | 36 | 17 | 0 | 0 | — | | 0 | 0 | 36 | 17 |
| Salford City | 2018–19 | National League | 0 | 0 | 0 | 0 | — | | 0 | 0 | 0 | 0 |
| Salford City | Total | | 36 | 17 | 0 | 0 | 0 | 0 | 0 | 0 | 36 | 17 |
| FC Halifax Town | 2019–20 | National League | 14 | 3 | 0 | 0 | — | | 4 (Note: 3 appearances and 2 goals in FA Trophy, one appearance in National League play-offs) | 2 | 18 | 5 |
| York City | 2020–21 | National League North | 10 | 1 | 0 | 0 | — | | 1 (Note: Appearance(s) in FA Trophy) | 1 | 11 | 2 |
| Ashton United | 2021–22 | Northern Premier Division | 27 | 5 | 1 | 0 | — | | 2 | 0 | 30 | 5 |
| Chester (loan) | 2021–22 | National League North | 11 | 2 | 0 | 0 | — | | 1 | 0 | 12 | 2 |
| Career total | | | 274 | 78 | 5 | 0 | 3 | 0 | 16 | 5 | 298 | 83 |
