= Shaun Beeley =

English footballer

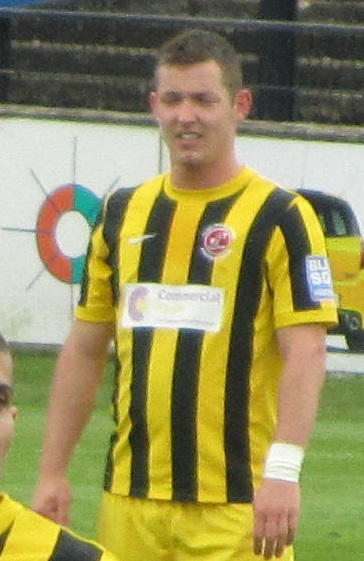
- Beeley playing for Fleetwood Town in 2012

Personal information
- Full name: Shaun Anthony Beeley
- Date of birth: 21 November 1988 (age 37)
- Place of birth: Stockport, England
- Position: Defender

Team information
- Current team: Warrington Town
- Number: 2

Youth career
- 2005–2007: Oldham Athletic

Senior career*
Years	Team	Apps	(Gls)
2007	Southport	2	(0)
2007–2014	Fleetwood Town	105	(3)
2009	→ Salford City (loan)	0	(0)
2013–2014	→ Bury (loan)	20	(0)
2014–2016	Morecambe	67	(0)
2016–2017	Barrow	34	(1)
2017-	Warrington Town		

International career
2012	England C	1	(0)
- * Club domestic league appearances and goals as of 11:52, 10 May 2017 (UTC)

Shaun Anthony Beeley (born 21 November 1988) is an English footballer who plays as a defender. He currently plays for Warrington Town. He has also been capped for England C.

== Career ==
Beeley spent his youth career in the youth academy at Oldham Athletic. He then joined Southport of the Conference National. Beeley joined Fleetwood Town on 1 November 2007. He was a member of the Fleetwood side that won promotion to the Conference North, Conference National and Football League Two. On 13 August 2012 Beeley made his Football League Cup debut against Nottingham Forest where Town lost 0–1 to the Championship side. On 30 January 2014, Beeley was released from Fleetwood Town. Beeley joined Bury on a six-month loan deal from Fleetwood Town and he scored his first goal in the 1st round of the Football League Cup against Crewe Alexandra, Bury went on to win the match 3–2.

After being released by Fleetwood, Beeley agreed terms with Morecambe taking him to the end of the 2013–14 season. Beeley signed a two-year deal with the Shrimps in May 2014. Beeley was released by Morecambe in May 2016, and signed for Barrow AFC in the National League (formerly the Conference National). He spent one season at Barrow before being released. In July 2017 Beeley joined Warrington Town on a part-time basis, as he wanted to focus on pursuing a career outside football.

== England C cap ==
Fleetwood Town's Shaun Beeley earned his first England C cap and follows in the steps of Highbury teammates Richard Brodie, Rob Atkinson, Peter Cavanagh and Andy Mangan who have all worn the Three Lions shirts. The 'C' team are the national football team that represents England at non-league level.
