= Kevin Ellison (footballer) =

English footballer (born 1979)

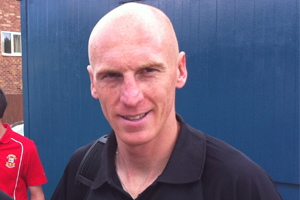
- Ellison in 2010

Personal information
- Full name: Kevin Ellison
- Date of birth: 23 February 1979 (age 47)
- Place of birth: Liverpool, England
- Height: 6 ft 2 in (1.88 m)
- Positions: Winger; striker

Team information
- Current team: Vauxhall Motors

Senior career*
Years	Team	Apps	(Gls)
1996–1997	Southport	4	(0)
1997–1998	Chorley	4	(0)
1998–1999	Conwy United	37	(7)
1999–2001	Altrincham	51	(23)
2001	Leicester City	1	(0)
2001–2004	Stockport County	48	(2)
2004	→ Lincoln City (loan)	13	(0)
2004–2005	Chester City	24	(9)
2005–2006	Hull City	39	(2)
2006–2007	Tranmere Rovers	34	(4)
2007–2009	Chester City	75	(19)
2009–2011	Rotherham United	62	(11)
2011	→ Bradford City (loan)	7	(1)
2011–2020	Morecambe	352	(81)
2020–2022	Newport County	33	(3)
2022	Warrington Rylands	2	(0)
2022–2023	City of Liverpool	27	(5)
2023–2024	Runcorn Town	9	(1)
2024–	Vauxhall Motors	97	(30)
- * Club domestic league appearances and goals as of 20 October 2026 (UTC)

Kevin Ellison (born 23 February 1979) is an English former professional footballer who plays as a forward for Northern Premier League Division One West club Vauxhall Motors.

He has represented fourteen clubs during his career, making in excess of 550 appearances in the Football League; including 350 games for Morecambe. Ellison also played once in the Premier League for Leicester City. He also played in the Football League for Stockport County, Lincoln City, Chester City, Hull City, Rotherham United, Bradford City and Newport County. He has featured semi-professionally for Southport, Chorley, Conwy United, Altrincham and Warrington Rylands. He is also one of the few footballers to have made over 1,000 competitive appearances.

During the 2019–20 season, Ellison briefly acted as a coach for Morecambe.

== Career ==
=== Early career ===
Born in Liverpool, Ellison started his career in non-league football, playing for Southport, Chorley, Conwy United and Altrincham. In February 2001 he joined Leicester City for a £50,000 fee. At Leicester he made his only appearance as a late substitute against Manchester United at Old Trafford. He later joined Stockport County. In 2004, he was loaned out to Lincoln City. In August 2004 he was transferred to Chester City.

Ellison signed for Hull City in January 2005 for a £100,000 fee. Despite a solid work rate he often struggled for form and was regularly in the shadow of Stuart Elliott, the Tigers' most outstanding left winger of recent times. Ellison did score an individual goal away at Southampton in a 1–1 draw and was part of the 2004–05 team that gained promotion from the third tier to the Championship. In June 2006, Hull accepted £100,000 for the player from Scunthorpe United, though Ellison refused the move. Instead he joined Tranmere Rovers for an undisclosed fee. In June 2007 he moved on to Chester City for £150,000, signing a three-year contract.

His first league game back at Chester was a goalless draw with Chesterfield on 11 August 2007. In January 2008 Wrexham put in a five-figure offer for the player, though he did not make the move. Stockport County also attempted to win his signature, but were also unsuccessful.

In the 2008–09 Football League Two campaign, Ellison scored a hat-trick for Chester in a 3–1 victory over Grimsby Town on 13 September 2008. He scored 12 other league goals during the season, which still ended with the club being relegated from The Football League. On 11 August 2009, he scored the winning goal as Rotherham upset Championship side Derby County 2–1 in the first round of the Football League Cup.

In February 2011, Ellison was loaned to Rotherham's fellow League Two side Bradford City, with Omar Daley moving in the opposite direction. He scored the only goal of a 1–0 win against Wycombe Wanderers in his Bradford debut.

=== Morecambe ===
Ellison was released by Rotherham at the end of the 2010–11 season. On 31 May 2011, Ellison signed for Jim Bentley's Morecambe on a one-year contract.

On 1 January 2012, Ellison signed an extension to his Morecambe contract, which would keep him at the Globe Arena for a further 18 months.

In June 2018 Ellison publicly talked about his struggles with depression, giving advice to fellow professionals. In November 2018, a club-released YouTube video featuring Ellison challenging his online gaming speed stat gained notoriety when it was featured on the sports website Deadspin.

He signed a new one-year contract with Morecambe in June 2019. Following Jim Bentley's departure as manager on 28 October 2019, Ellison assumed the role of caretaker player-manager, alongside Barry Roche. Ellison's only match in charge was the 1–0 home win against Leyton Orient in League Two on 2 November 2019. Derek Adams was appointed Morecambe team manager on 7 November 2019. In June 2020, Ellison was released by Morecambe after 352 league appearances during nine years with the club and having scored 88 goals.

=== Newport County ===
On 4 September 2020, Ellison joined fellow League Two side Newport County on a one-year deal. For the 2020–21 season, Newport County appointed Ellison as their 'mental health ambassador'. He made his debut for Newport on 6 October 2020 in the starting line up for the 5–0 EFL Trophy defeat against Norwich City Under 21s. His first goal for Newport was the 96th minute winner in a 1–0 League Two win against Port Vale on 21 November 2020.

When he came on as a substitute in the second leg of Newport's play-off semi-final against Forest Green Rovers on 23 May 2021, he became the oldest outfield player in play-off history. He scored a goal in the 70th minute, thus also becoming the oldest goal scorer in the play-offs. Ellison played for Newport in the League Two play-off final at Wembley Stadium on 31 May 2021 which Newport lost to his former club, Morecambe, 1–0 after extra time.

On 26 July 2021, Ellison signed a new one-year deal to stay at Newport through the 2021–22 season. As part of the deal, he would also take up a coaching role with the club's development squad. He was released by Newport at the end of the 2021–22 season, stating his decision to continue playing.

=== Non-League ===
In August 2022, Ellison signed for Northern Premier League Premier Division club Warrington Rylands. On 23 September 2022, Ellison joined City of Liverpool. On his debut, he contributed two assists and a goal.

In September 2023 Ellison signed for North West Counties League Division One North club Runcorn Town and scored on his debut - a 2–2 draw against Garstang.

== International career ==
He has made appearances for England's veterans national team.

== Career statistics ==
- Correct after match played 14 November 2026

Appearances and goals by club, season and competition
Club	Season	League			FA Cup		League Cup		Other		Total	
Club	Season	Division	Apps	Goals	Apps	Goals	Apps	Goals	Apps	Goals	Apps	Goals
Southport	1996–97	Football Conference	4	0	0	0	—		0	0	4	0
Chorley	1997–98	NPL Premier Division	4	1	0	0	—		0	0	4	1
Conwy United	1997–98	League of Wales	9	2	—		—		—		9	2
Conwy United	1998–99	League of Wales	28	5	—		—		—		28	5
Conwy United	Total		37	7	—		—		—		37	7
Altrincham	1999–2000	Football Conference	37	14	3	1	—		9	1	49	16
Altrincham	2000–01	NPL Premier Division	17	9	1	0	—		2 (Note: Appearance(s) in NPL League Challenge Cup)	1	20	10
Altrincham	Total		54	23	4	1	—		11	2	69	26
Leicester City	2000–01	Premier League	1	0	0	0	0	0	0	0	1	0
Leicester City	2001–02	Premier League	0	0	—		0	0	0	0	0	0
Leicester City	Total		1	0	0	0	0	0	0	0	1	0
Stockport County	2001–02	First Division	11	0	1	0	0	0	0	0	12	0
Stockport County	2002–03	Second Division	23	1	0	0	0	0	1 (Note: Appearance(s) in Football League Trophy)	0	24	1
Stockport County	2003–04	Second Division	14	1	0	0	1	0	1	0	16	1
Stockport County	Total		48	2	1	0	1	0	2	0	52	2
Lincoln City (loan)	2003–04	Third Division	13	0	0	0	—		0	0	13	0
Chester City	2004–05	League Two	24	9	3	1	1	0	2	1	30	11
Hull City	2004–05	League One	16	1	—		—		0	0	16	1
Hull City	2005–06	Championship	23	1	1	0	1	0	0	0	25	1
Hull City	Total		39	2	1	0	1	0	0	0	41	2
Tranmere Rovers	2006–07	League One	34	4	1	0	1	0	2	0	38	4
Chester City	2007–08	League Two	36	11	1	0	1	0	1	0	39	11
Chester City	2008–09	League Two	39	8	1	0	1	0	1	1	42	9
Chester City	Total		75	19	2	0	2	0	2	1	81	20
Rotherham United	2009–10	League Two	39	8	2	1	2	1	4 (Note: One appearance in Football League Trophy, three appearances and one goal in League Two play-offs)	1	47	11
Rotherham United	2010–11	League Two	23	3	1	0	1	0	2	1	27	4
Rotherham United	Total		62	11	3	1	3	1	6	2	74	15
Bradford City (loan)	2010–11	League Two	7	1	—		—		0	0	7	1
Morecambe	2011–12	League Two	34	15	1	0	2	1	1	1	38	17
Morecambe	2012–13	League Two	40	11	3	1	2	0	1	1	46	13
Morecambe	2013–14	League Two	42	10	1	0	1	0	1	0	45	10
Morecambe	2014–15	League Two	43	11	1	0	1	0	0	0	45	11
Morecambe	2015–16	League Two	44	9	2	0	1	0	3	0	50	9
Morecambe	2016–17	League Two	45	8	1	0	2	1	2 (Note: Appearance(s) in EFL Trophy)	0	50	9
Morecambe	2017–18	League Two	40	9	1	1	1	0	2	0	44	10
Morecambe	2018–19	League Two	43	7	2	0	1	0	3	0	49	7
Morecambe	2019–20	League Two	21	1	0	0	1	0	2	1	24	2
Morecambe	Total		352	81	12	2	12	2	15	3	391	88
Newport County	2020–21	League Two	23	2	3	0	0	0	4 (Note: Two appearances in EFL Trophy, two appearances and one goal in League Two play-offs)	1	30	3
Newport County	2021–22	League Two	10	1	1	0	2	0	2	0	15	1
Newport County	Total		33	3	4	0	2	0	6	1	45	4
Warrington Rylands	2022–23	NPL Premier Division	2	0	1	0	—		0	0	3	0
City of Liverpool	2022–23	NPL Division One West	27	5	—		—		1 (Note: Appearance(s) in Liverpool Senior Cup)	0	28	5
Runcorn Town	2023–24	NWCFL Division One North	9	1	—		—		5 (Note: Two appearances in FA Vase, two appearances and one goal in NWCFL Challenge Cup, one appearance in Liverpool Senior Cup)	1	14	2
Vauxhall Motors	2023–24	NPL Division One West	6	2	0	0	—		0	0	6	2
Vauxhall Motors	2024–25	NPL Division One West	39	13	2	0	—		3 (Note: One appearance in FA Trophy, one appearance and two goals in Cheshire Senior Cup, one appearance in NPL Division One West play-offs)	2	44	15
Vauxhall Motors	2025–26	NPL Division One West	41	13	0	0	—		3 (Note: One appearance in FA Trophy, two appearances in Cheshire Senior Cup)	0	44	13
Vauxhall Motors	2026–27	NPL Division One West	16	2	0	0	—		0	0	16	2
Vauxhall Motors	Total		102	30	2	0	—		6	2	110	32
Career total			927	199	34	5	23	3	58	13	1042	220

== See also ==
- List of men's footballers with 1,000 or more official appearances
