= Andy Parrish =

English footballer (born 1988)

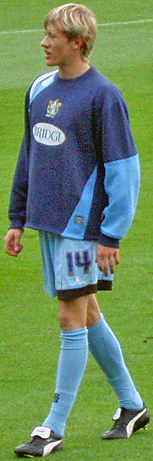

Personal information
- Full name: Andrew Michael Parrish
- Date of birth: 22 June 1988 (age 38)
- Place of birth: Bolton, England
- Height: 6 ft 0 in (1.83 m)
- Position: Defender

Team information
- Current team: Bolton Wanderers (u-19 assistant coach)

Youth career
- ?–2005: Bury

Senior career*
Years	Team	Apps	(Gls)
2005–2008	Bury	43	(1)
2008–2016	Morecambe	251	(1)
- * Club domestic league appearances and goals as of 15:24,10 may 2016(UTC)

Andrew Michael Parrish (born 22 June 1988) is an English retired footballer, who is currently the assistant coach of Bolton Wanderers under 19 team.

== Playing Career ==
Parrish came through the ranks at Bury, signing a two-year professional contract in September 2005, before making a breakthrough in the 2005–06 season aged 17, when he made eight appearances. The 2006–07 season brought more first team action for him, where he made 10 appearances overall. He signed a new twelve-month contract in July 2007, and made a further 26 league appearances in 2007–08.

He joined Morecambe in June 2008 after being released by Bury at the end of the 2007–08 season. He plays at either right back or centre back. At the end of the 2015–16 season, he was among 3 players released by the club after spending 8 years at the Globe Arena. He was released by Morecambe in May 2016.

== Coaching Career ==
After retiring from playing, he was a Youth Development coach for Manchester United and owns and runs online coaching platform Playerz, which launched in 2020.

In June 2026, it was announced that he had been promoted into the senior academy set-up at hometown club Bolton Wanderers, assisting with coaching at under-19 level.
