= Danny Carlton =

English footballer

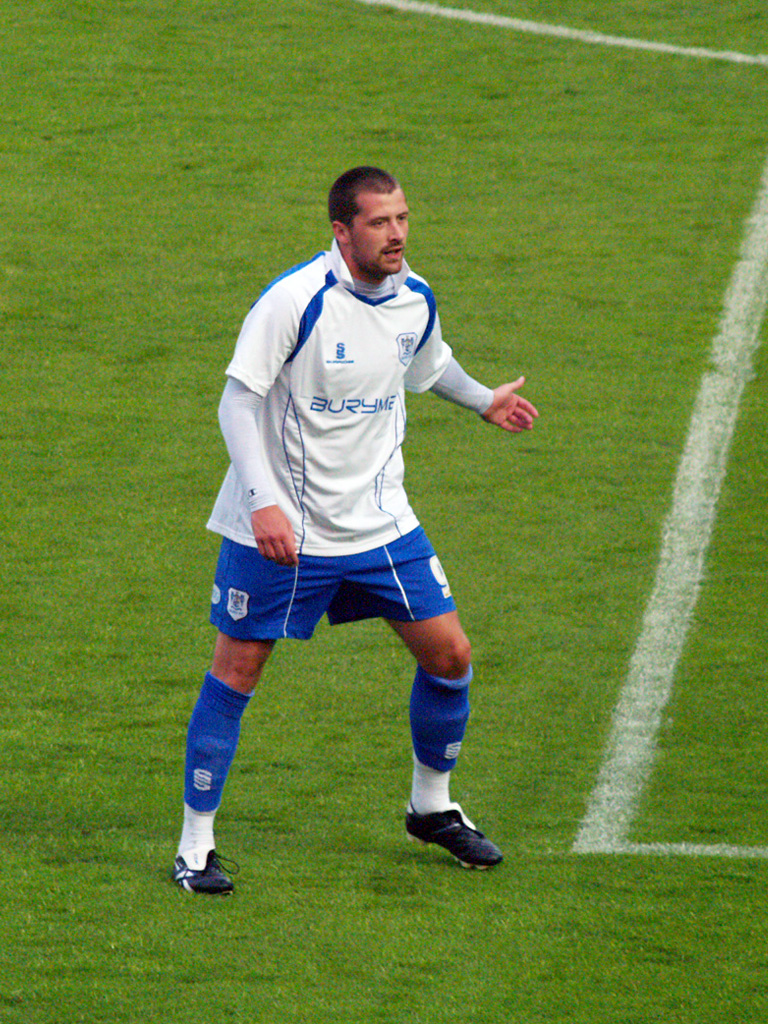
- Carlton playing for Bury in 2009

Personal information
- Full name: Daniel Andrew Carlton
- Date of birth: 22 December 1983 (age 42)
- Place of birth: Leeds, England
- Height: 5 ft 11 in (1.80 m)
- Position: Striker

Youth career
- –2002: Morecambe

Senior career*
| Years | Team | Apps | (Gls) |
| 2002–2007 | Morecambe | 185 | (60) |
| 2007–2009 | Carlisle United | 43 | (3) |
| 2008–2009 | → Morecambe (loan) | 8 | (2) |
| 2009 | → Darlington (loan) | 17 | (4) |
| 2009–2011 | Bury | 10 | (0) |
| 2010 | → Grimsby Town (loan) | 6 | (0) |
| 2011 | → Morecambe (loan) | 16 | (3) |
| 2011–2013 | Morecambe | 46 | (9) |
| 2013–2014 | Hyde | 24 | (1) |
| 2014 | → Chester (loan) | 7 | (3) |
| 2015–2016 | Lancaster City | 9 | (1) |
| Total | | 371 | (93) |
- * Club domestic league appearances and goals

Daniel Andrew Carlton (born 22 December 1983) is an English former professional footballer.

As a player, he was a forward from 2002 to 2014 before returning to football in 2015. He started his career with Morecambe before joining Carlisle United, he returned to Morecambe a year later for a loan spell. he then went on loan to Darlington before joining Bury on a permanent deal. He then had a loan spell at Grimsby Town and Morecambe again before completing a permanent move back to the club. He joined Hyde and retired after finishing his career with a loan spell at Chester.

In August 2015, Carlton returned to football, signing a contract with Lancaster City of the Northern Premier League.

== Career ==
=== Morecambe ===
Born in Leeds, West Yorkshire, Carlton started his career with Morecambe, where he came through the youth ranks. He spent six years with Morecambe, making 180 appearances and scoring 59 goals in the league.

On 26 May 2004, he signed a three-year extension to his contract with Morecambe.

Carlton scored the winning goal for Morecambe in the 2007 Conference National play-off final with a shot from 20 yards, which saw the club promoted into the Football League with a 2–1 win over Exeter City.

=== Carlisle United ===
In the summer of 2007, Carlton signed for Carlisle United for a nominal fee. In his first season, he was mainly used as substitute. In total he made 46 appearances for Carlisle and scored 3 goals. All of his goals were scored at the beginning of the 2008–09 season, where on 9 August, he fired Carlisle to a 3–2 opening day victory away at Bristol Rovers, scoring twice.

On 11 November 2008, Carlton returned to Morecambe on a one-month loan. His loan with Morecambe was extended by a further month on 16 November 2008.

On 14 January 2009, Carlton joined Darlington on loan until the end of the season.

In the summer of 2009, Carlton was released from Carlisle.

=== Bury ===
On 1 July 2009, he signed for Bury.

On 23 September 2010 he joined Grimsby Town on an initial one-month loan, where he played five games before returning to Bury on 20 October 2010. He cancelled his contract by mutual consent with Bury on 31 January 2011.

=== Return to Morecambe ===
Carlton re-signed for Morecambe on a short-term deal in February 2011. He then signed a two-year contract with the club on 1 July. On 9 August 2011 he scored the first goal in the 2–0 win over Barnsley. On 10 September 2011 he scored the first hat-trick of his career in the 6–0 demolition over Crawley Town. On 3 September 2012, he was ruled out for seven months through injury.

On 31 July 2013, Morecambe announced that they would not offer Carlton a new contract.

=== Hyde FC & Chester FC ===
On 7 August 2013, Carlton signed for Conference Premier side Hyde after impressing in pre-season.

In March 2014, he joined Chester on loan until the end of the season.

At the end of the 2013–14 season, Carlton decided to retire after suffering with a long-standing knee injury having spent the last three months of the season on loan at Chester.

=== Lancaster City ===
In August 2015, Carlton came out of retirement and signed for Northern Premier League side Lancaster City. Carlton had for part the 2014–15 season involved himself with North Lancashire and District Football League club CC Wanderers, helping with the running of the team and appearing on the odd occasion, however at the end of the season CC Wanderers folded and Carlton took up the opportunity to sign for The Dolly Blues.

== International career ==
Carlton was called up to the England National Game XI in May 2004 for a fixture against Iraq.

He was again called up to the England National Game XI for a match against Finland U21 in May 2007.

== Honours ==
Morecambe

- Conference National play-offs: 2007
