= Chris Doyle (footballer) =

English footballer

Personal information
- Full name: Christopher Doyle
- Date of birth: 17 February 1995 (age 31)
- Place of birth: Liverpool, England
- Height: 1.89 m (6 ft 2 1/2 in)

Team information
- Current team: Warrington Town

Youth career
- Everton
- –2012: Morecambe

Senior career*
Years	Team	Apps	(Gls)
2012–2016	Morecambe	17	(1)
2014–2015	→ Chorley (loan)	24	(5)
2015–2016	→ Chorley (loan)	10	(2)
2018–2019	Marine	42	(6)
2019–2021	F.C. United of Manchester	49	(3)
2021–2023	Southport	70	(9)
2023–2025	Marine	64	(9)
2025–	Warrington Town	7	(1)
- * Club domestic league appearances and goals as of 14:37, 10 October 2025 (UTC)

Christopher John Doyle (born 17 February 1995) is an English semi-professional footballer who plays as a defender for Northern Premier League Premier Division club Warrington Town.

== Early life and education ==
Doyle attended Sacred Heart Catholic College in Crosby, Liverpool.

== Career ==
Doyle spent time in the Everton Academy from the age of 10 to 14 before joining Dickie Danson's youth setup at Morecambe.

=== Morecambe ===
He was awarded a professional contract a year early at the age of 17 at the start of the 2012–13 season. He made his first team debut coming on as a late substitute in a League Two fixture seeing the club win 3-0 against Rochdale. Whilst at the club he joined Chorley on loan until the end of the 2014–15 season scoring five times in 26 appearances and reaching the Conference North play-off final. He signed an extended 12-month contract with the club at start of 2015–16 season. He was released by Morecambe in May 2016.

On 20 April 2013, during a home match against Torquay United, Doyle was sent off in the first half after bringing down Elliot Benyon.

== Non-league career ==
Doyle joined Southport in August 2016. He then joined Marine in July 2018. In August 2019 he joined FC United of Manchester. On 25 June 2021, Southport Football Club announced Doyle was returning to the club on initial one year contract, with an option for a further year. He returned to Marine in the summer of 2023.

=== Chorley (loan) ===
Doyle spent two loan spells with Chorley in the National League North during the 2014–15 and 2015–16 seasons. He played a role in Chorley’s run to the 2015 promotion play-off final, starting with the 2–3 defeat to Guiseley at Victory Park.

=== Marine (return and promotion) ===
Doyle rejoined Marine in 2023, helping the team secure promotion from the Northern Premier League in the 2023–24 season. He made 49 appearances and scored 4 goals across all competitions, including Marine’s 2–1 victory over Macclesfield in the play-off final.

He continued as a central figure in Marine’s squad during the 2024–25 season, contributing 6 goals in 26 National League North appearances. He left the club by mutual consent in October 2025.

=== Warrington Town ===
In October 2025, Doyle joined Northern Premier League Premier Division club Warrington Town.

== Career statistics ==
As of July 2025

Season	Club	League	League Apps	League Goals	Other Competitions	Other Goals		
2012–13	Morecambe	League Two	4	0	–	–		
2013–14	Morecambe	League Two	3	0	–	–		
2014–15	Morecambe	League Two	2	0	EFL Trophy: 1	0		
2014–15	Chorley (loan)	National League North	24	5	–	–		
2015–16	Morecambe	League Two	8	1	–	–		
2015–16	Chorley (loan)	National League North	10	2	–	–		
2016–17	–	–	Injured (cruciate ligament)					
2017–18	–	–	Injured (cruciate ligament)					
2018–19	Marine	Northern Premier League	42	6	–	–		
2019–20	F.C. United of Manchester	Northern Premier League	39	3	–	–		
2020–21	F.C. United	Northern Premier League	10	0	FA Cup: 1 Other: 5	0		
2021–22	Southport	National League North	26	2	–	–		
2022–23	Southport	National League North	31	5	Other: 13	2		
2023–24	Marine	Northern Premier League	37	3	FA Cup: 1 Other: 11	1		
2024–25	Marine	National League North	26	6	–	–		
League Total			262	33	32	3	Total Apps: 294	Total Goals: 36
