= Joe McGee (English footballer) =

English footballer

Personal information
- Full name: Joseph Vincent McGee
- Date of birth: 6 March 1993 (age 33)
- Place of birth: Wigan, England
- Height: 1.81 m (5 ft 11 1/2 in)
- Position: Midfielder

Youth career
- 2009–2011: Morecambe

Senior career*
Years	Team	Apps	(Gls)
2011–2014	Morecambe	15	(0)
2013	→ Workington (loan)	7	(1)
2014–2015	Buxton	0	(0)
2015–2017	Workington	47	(16)
2017–2018	Buxton	0	(0)
- * Club domestic league appearances and goals as of 09:10, 8 May 2014 (UTC)

Joseph Vincent McGee (born 6 March 1993) is an English footballer who plays as a midfielder.

== Career ==
McGee was born in Wigan. He signed a two-year scholarship in the summer of 2009. He made his debut for Morecambe on 21 April 2012, in a 3–2 defeat to Rotherham United coming on as a second-half substitute for Niall Cowperthwaite A few days after it was announced that he was to be out of action for 9 months with a cruciate ligament injury, Joe McGee was released by Morecambe along with three others on 6 May 2014. Joe McGee joined Buxton but did not make a single first team appearance for them and ending up joining Workington FC on a free transfer on a one-year contract for the 2015/16 season. 2020/21 Season McGee signed for Parthenope in SW London and is now into his second season with the club.

== Personal life ==
In 2018 he graduated from the University of Salford with a first class degree in Physiotherapy.
