= Joe Mwasile =

Zambian footballer (born 1993)

Personal information
- Full name: Joseph Mwasile
- Date of birth: 6 July 1993 (age 33)
- Place of birth: Zambia
- Position: Midfielder

Team information
- Current team: Pilkington

Senior career*
Years	Team	Apps	(Gls)
2011–2014	Morecambe	30	(0)
2012–2013	→ Workington (loan)	11	(4)
2014	→ Altrincham (loan)	5	(1)
2014	→ Barrow (loan)	6	(0)
2014–2015	Workington	6	(2)
2015	Burscough	14	(1)
2015–2016	Salford City	28	(1)
2016	Marine	16	(3)
2016–2017	Nantwich Town	30	(4)
2017	Warrington Town	11	(1)
2017–2022	Nantwich Town		
2022	Witton Albion	14	(2)
2022	Nantwich Town		
- AFC Liverpool
- Ashton Athletic
2023–	Witton Albion		
- Hanley Town
?–2024	Stafford Rangers		
2025	Hanley Town		
- Litherland REMYCA
- City of Liverpool
2026–	Pilkington		
- * Club domestic league appearances and goals as of 21:29, 28 October 2022 (UTC)

Joseph Mwasile (born 6 July 1993) is a Zambian footballer who plays as a midfielder for Pilkington. He played in the Football League for Morecambe.

== Career ==
Mwasile made his debut for Morecambe on 17 March 2012, in a 6–0 win over Barnet, coming on as a late substitute for Jordan Burrow.

In October 2012 he joined Workington on loan, scoring his first goal for the club on 24 October in a 2–1 league match win over Altrincham.

It was announced that Mwasile was released by Morecambe on 6 May 2014 along with three other players. He then played for Workington, where he had previously been on loan in 2012.

In the summer of 2015 he joined Salford City and left the club in May 2016. He subsequently signed for Marine and in November 2016 he joined Nantwich Town.

In July 2017 he signed for Warrington Town and scored on his league debut for the club having come on as a substitute. October 2017 saw Mwasile return to Nantwich Town and he clocked up his 150th appearance for the Dabbers at Radcliffe in March 2020.

In February 2022 he joined Witton Albion. In August 2022, Mwasile returned to Nantwich Town.
