= 2010–11 Morecambe F.C. season =

Morecambe
2010–11 season
- Chairman: Peter McGuigan
- Manager: Sammy McIlroy
- Stadium: Globe Arena
- League Two: 20th
- FA Cup: First round
- League Cup: Second round
- League Trophy: First round
- Biggest win: Morecambe 5–0 Stockport County; 2 November 2010
- Biggest defeat: Port Vale 7–2 Morecambe; 30 April 2011

This page shows the progress of Morecambe F.C. in the 2010–11 football season. This year they play their games in League Two in the English league system. This would be Morecambe's fourth season in the Football League and their first playing at home at the newly built Globe Arena.

== Football League Two ==
=== League table ===
Pos	Team	Pld	W	D	L	GF	GA	GD	Pts
18	Bradford City	46	15	7	24	43	68	−25	52
19	Burton Albion	46	12	15	19	56	70	−14	51
20	Morecambe	46	13	12	21	54	73	−19	51
21	Hereford United	46	12	17	17	50	66	−16	50 (Note: Torquay United deducted one point and Hereford United deducted three points)
22	Barnet	46	12	12	22	58	77	−19	48

Updated to match(es) played on 28 May 2011. Source: The Football League
Rules for classification: 1) points; 2) goal difference; 3) number of goals scored.

=== Results summary ===
Overall								Home						Away					
Pld	W	D	L	GF	GA	GD	Pts	W	D	L	GF	GA	GD	W	D	L	GF	GA	GD
46	13	12	21	54	73	−19	51	6	8	9	26	31	−5	7	4	12	28	42	−14

Last updated: 11 May 2011.
Source: Morecambe F.C.

=== Results by round ===
Round	1	2	3	4	5	6	7	8	9	10	11	12	13	14	15	16	17	18	19	20	21	22	23	24	25	26	27	28	29	30	31	32	33	34	35	36	37	38	39	40	41	42	43	44	45	46
Ground	A	H	A	H	A	H	A	H	H	A	H	A	H	A	H	H	A	H	H	H	A	A	H	A	A	A	H	H	A	A	H	A	A	H	A	H	A	H	H	A	H	A	A	H	A	H
Result	L	D	L	D	L	D	W	D	L	W	W	L	D	L	W	L	D	L	W	L	W	W	W	L	L	D	D	D	L	D	L	L	W	W	L	L	W	L	L	W	W	D	L	D	L	L
Position			21	21	24	24	21	20	22	20	17	20	19	20	17	19	19	21	19	21	20	16	13	17	17	17	18	18	19	17	18	20	19	17	19	21	19	19	19	16	15	15	15	15	17	20

Updated to match(es) played on 1 July 2011. Source: Results
A = Away; H = Home; W = Win; D = Draw; L = Loss

=== Matches ===
League Two match details
Date	Opponents	Venue	Result	Score F–A	Scorers	Attendance	Ref.
7 August 2010	Wycombe Wanderers	A	L	0–2		4,016	
14 August 2010	Rotherham United	H	D	0–0		3,258	
21 August 2010	Burton Albion	A	L	2–3	Fleming 8', 51'	2,072	
28 August 2010	Gillingham	H	D	1–1	Stanley 60'	2,325	
4 September 2010	Oxford United	A	L	0–4		6,237	
11 September 2010	Chesterfield	H	D	1–1	Brown 26'	2,323	
18 September 2010	Southend United	A	W	3–2	Drummond 21', Mullin 26', Spencer 73'	5,106	
25 September 2010	Barnet	H	D	2–2	Drummond 70', Mullin 83'	2,221	
28 September 2010	Bury	H	L	1–4	Drummond 45+2'	2,607	
2 October 2010	Bradford City	A	W	1–0	Mullin 23'	10,640	
9 October 2010	Shrewsbury Town	H	W	1–0	Stanley 83'	3,239	
16 October 2010	Aldershot Town	A	L	1–2	Brown 66'	2,308	
23 October 2010	Stevenage	H	D	0–0		2,254	
30 October 2010	Torquay United	A	L	1–3	McCready 30'	2,172	
2 November 2010	Stockport County	H	W	5–0	Jevons 8' (pen.), 38', 66', Bentley 33', Brown 68'	2,005	
13 November 2010	Lincoln City	H	L	1–2	Jevons 6'	2,085	
20 November 2010	Cheltenham Town	A	D	1–1	Jevons 80' (pen.)	2,524	
27 November 2010	Crewe Alexandra	H	L	1–2	Shuker 89'	1,793	
11 December 2010	Port Vale	H	W	1–0	Charnock 27'	2,326	
1 January 2011	Accrington Stanley	H	L	1–2	McCready 27'	2,702	
3 January 2011	Stockport County	A	W	2–0	Shuker 29', Spencer 32'	3,890	
8 January 2011	Shrewsbury Town	A	W	3–1	Holden 7' (o.g.), Spencer 28', Wilson 48' (pen.)	4,605	
15 January 2011	Torquay United	H	W	2–1	Wilson 87' (pen.), 90+2' (pen.)	1,643	
22 January 2011	Stevenage	A	L	0–2		2,002	
25 January 2011	Hereford United	A	L	1–2	Drummond 52'	1,831	
1 February 2011	Accrington Stanley	A	D	1–1	Jevons 66'	1,675	
5 February 2011	Cheltenham Town	H	D	1–1	Drummond 58'	1,691	
8 February 2011	Aldershot Town	H	D	1–1	Holdsworth 51'	1,703	
12 February 2011	Lincoln City	A	L	0–2		2,884	
15 February 2011	Northampton Town	A	D	3–3	Hurst 22', Spencer 65', Mullin 88'	3,522	
19 February 2011	Oxford United	H	L	0–3		2,171	
22 February 2011	Macclesfield Town	A	L	0–2		1,286	
26 February 2011	Chesterfield	A	W	2–0	Hurst 22', Spencer 57'	6,441	
5 March 2011	Southend United	H	W	2–1	McCready 28', Drummond 63'	1,917	
8 March 2011	Bury	A	L	0–1		2,480	
12 March 2011	Bradford City	H	L	0–1		3,521	
19 March 2011	Barnet	A	W	2–1	Carlton 35', 42'	2,510	
22 March 2011	Macclesfield Town	H	L	1–2	Spencer 59'	1,612	
26 March 2011	Wycombe Wanderers	H	L	0–3		1,940	
2 April 2011	Rotherham United	A	W	1–0	Spencer 82'	3,661	
9 April 2011	Burton Albion	H	W	2–1	McCready 14', Carlton 67'	1,877	
16 April 2011	Gillingham	A	D	1–1	Jevons 21' (pen.)	5,545	
22 April 2011	Crewe Alexandra	A	L	1–2	Hunter 58'	3,614	
25 April 2011	Hereford United	H	D	1–1	Haining 71'	2,016	
30 April 2011	Port Vale	A	L	2–7	Jevons 32', Spencer 79'	4,134	
7 May 2011	Northampton Town	H	L	1–2	Cowperthwaite 90+1'	2,674	

== FA Cup ==
FA Cup match details
Round	Date	Opponents	Venue	Result	Score F–A	Scorers	Attendance	Ref.
First round	6 November 2010	Cheltenham Town	A	L	0–1		2,066	

== Football League Cup ==
League Cup match details
Round	Date	Opponents	Venue	Result	Score F–A	Scorers	Attendance	Ref.
First round	10 August 2010	Coventry City	H	W	2–0	Fleming 45+2', 61'	4,002	
Second round	24 August 2010	Burnley	H	L	1–3	Jevons 12'	5,003	

== Football League Trophy ==
Football League Trophy match details
Round	Date	Opponents	Venue	Result	Score F–A	Scorers	Attendance	Ref.
First round	31 August 2010	Macclesfield Town	A	L	0–1		720	

== Appearances and goals ==
As of 6 May 2011.
(Substitute appearances in brackets)

No.	Pos.	Name	League		FA Cup		League Cup		League Trophy		Total		Discipline	
No.	Pos.	Name	Apps	Goals	Apps	Goals	Apps	Goals	Apps	Goals	Apps	Goals	Yellow card	Red card
1	GK	(Republic of Ireland) Barry Roche	42	0	1	0	2	0	1	0	46	0	1	0
2	DF	(Wales) Darren Moss	4	0	0	0	2	0	1	0	7	0	0	0
2	DF	(England) Andy Holdsworth	12 (3)	1	0	0	0	0	0	0	12 (3)	1	2	0
4	DF	(England) Paul Scott	6 (2)	0	0	0	2	0	0	0	8 (2)	0	2	0
5	DF	(England) Jim Bentley	7 (1)	1	0	0	0	0	0 (1)	0	7 (2)	1	2	0
6	MF	(England) Craig Stanley	21 (1)	2	1	0	2	0	0	0	24 (1)	2	5	0
7	MF	(England) Adam Rundle	8 (9)	0	0	0	1	0	0	0	9 (9)	0	0	0
8	MF	(England) Garry Hunter	27 (6)	1	1	0	0 (2)	0	1	0	29 (8)	1	4	0
9	FW	(England) Chris Shuker	12 (15)	2	0	0	2	0	1	0	15 (15)	2	2	1
10	FW	(England) Phil Jevons	27 (11)	8	1	0	2	1	0	0	30 (11)	9	2	0
11	MF	(England) Neil Wainwright	1 (4)	0	0 (1)	0	0	0	0	0	1 (5)	0	0	0
14	FW	(England) Jimmy Spencer	20 (12)	8	0 (1)	0	0	0	1	0	21 (13)	8	1	1
15	DF	(England) Chris McCready	36 (1)	3	1	0	2	0	0	0	39 (1)	3	3	0
16	MF	(England) Stewart Drummond	39 (2)	5	1	0	0 (1)	0	1	0	41 (3)	5	3	1
17	MF	(England) Andrew Fleming	23 (7)	2	0	0	2	2	0	0	25 (7)	4	3	0
18	MF	(England) Mark Duffy	16 (6)	0	1	0	1 (1)	0	1	0	19 (7)	0	2	0
18	MF	(England) Kevan Hurst	21	2	0	0	0	0	0	0	21	2	1	0
19	DF	(England) Laurence Wilson	37 (1)	3	1	0	2	0	1	0	41 (1)	3	8	1
20	FW	(England) Stuart Hendrie	1 (6)	0	0	0	0	0	0 (1)	0	1 (7)	0	0	0
21	FW	(England) Paul Mullin	15 (11)	4	1	0	0 (2)	0	1	0	17 (13)	4	1	0
22	DF	(England) Andy Parrish	41	0	1	0	2	0	1	0	45	0	2	1
24	DF	(England) Niall Cowperthwaite	6 (1)	1	0	0	0	0	0	0	6 (1)	1	1	0
26	DF	(Northern Ireland) Tony Capaldi	17 (1)	0	0	0	0	0	0	0	17 (1)	0	1	0
27	DF	(England) Kieran Charnock	20 (1)	1	0	0	0	0	0	0	20 (1)	1	3	0
28	DF	(Scotland) Will Haining	12	1	0	0	0	0	1	0	13	1	1	0
29	MF	(England) Scott Brown	19 (13)	3	1	0	0	0	0	0	20 (13)	3	2	0
30	FW	(England) Danny Carlton	11 (5)	3	0	0	0	0	0	0	11 (5)	3	2	0
31	GK	(England) Laurie Walker	0	0	0	0	0	0	0 (1)	0	0 (1)	0	0	0
32	GK	(England) Joe Anyon	4	0	0	0	0	0	0	0	4	0	0	0
33	MF	(England) Zac Aley	1 (1)	0	0	0	0	0	0	0	1 (1)	0	0	0

== Awards ==
End of Season Awards	Winner
Fans Club of Morecambe Player of the Year	Andy Parrish
Shrimpsvoices Player of the Year	Barry Roche
Community Sports Player of the Year	Jim Bentley
Visitor Player of the Year	Andy Parrish
Players' Player of the Year	Barry Roche
Reserves' Player of the Year	Niall Cowperthwaite
Under 18s Player of the Year	Joe Culshaw
Under 17s Player of the Year	James Short
Goal of the Season	Scott Brown (vs Aldershot Town, 16 October 2010)

== Transfers ==
Players transferred in
Date	Pos.	Name	From	Fee	Ref.
27 May 2010	MF	(England) Adam Rundle	(England) Chesterfield	Free	
15 June 2010	DF	(England) Paul Scott	(England) Bury	Free	
4 July 2010	FW	(England) Phil Jevons	(England) Huddersfield Town	Free	
27 July 2010	MF	(England) Andrew Fleming	(Wales) Wrexham	Free	
27 July 2010	DF	(England) Chris McCready	(England) Northampton Town	Free	
4 August 2010	FW	(England) Stuart Hendrie	(England) Atherstone Town	Undisclosed	
5 August 2010	GK	(England) Laurie Walker	(England) Cambridge United	Free	
3 September 2010	MF	(England) Scott Brown	(England) Cheltenham Town	Free	
16 September 2010	DF	(Northern Ireland) Tony Capaldi	(Wales) Cardiff City	Free	
6 January 2011	DF	(England) Kieran Charnock	(England) Torquay United	Undisclosed	
28 January 2011	DF	(England) Andy Holdsworth	(England) Oldham Athletic	Free	
15 February 2011	FW	(England) Danny Carlton	(England) Bury	Free	
Players loaned in
Date from	Pos.	Name	From	Date to	Ref.
13 July 2010	FW	(England) Jimmy Spencer	(England) Huddersfield Town	End of season	
25 November 2010	DF	(England) Kieran Charnock	(England) Torquay United	6 January 2011	
28 January 2011	MF	(England) Kevan Hurst	(England) Carlisle United	End of season	
8 March 2011	GK	(England) Joe Anyon	(England) Lincoln City	8 April 2011	
18 March 2011	MF	(England) Zac Aley	(England) Blackburn Rovers	End of season	
Players loaned out
Date from	Pos.	Name	To	Date to	Ref.
23 September 2010	FW	(England) Gavin Clark	(England) Kendal Town	9 November 2010	
28 September 2010	MF	(England) Neil Wainwright	(England) Barrow	28 October 2010	
9 November 2010	MF	(England) Chris Wraighte	(England) Kendal Town	11 December 2010	
28 January 2011	DF	(Scotland) Will Haining	(England) Fleetwood Town	11 December 2010	
31 January 2011	MF	(England) Craig Stanley	(England) Torquay United	3 May 2011	
1 March 2011	MF	(England) Adam Rundle	(England) Gateshead	End of season	
12 March 2011	FW	(England) Stuart Hendrie	(England) Tamworth	11 April 2011	
Players transferred out
Date	Pos.	Name	Subsequent club	Fee	Ref.
20 January 2011	MF	(England) Mark Duffy	(England) Scunthorpe United	Undisclosed	
Players released
Date	Pos.	Name	Subsequent club	Join date	Ref.
7 June 2010	DF	(Republic of Ireland) Henry McStay	(Northern Ireland) Portadown	7 June 2010	
16 June 2010	DF	(England) Dave Artell	(England) Crewe Alexandra	1 July 2010 (Bosman)	
24 June 2010	GK	(England) Scott Davies	(England) Fleetwood Town	1 July 2010	
1 July 2010	FW	(England) Wayne Curtis	(England) Fleetwood Town	29 July 2010	
1 July 2010	MF	(England) Fraser McLachlan	(Wales) Colwyn Bay	28 August 2010	
1 July 2010	FW	(England) Aaron Taylor	(England) Kendal Town	??	
1 July 2010	MF	(England) Matty Poole	(England) Lancaster City	??	
1 July 2010	DF	(England) Rory Winters	(England) Kendal Town	??	
1 July 2010	DF	(England) Ben Jackson	(England) Northwich Victoria	??	
21 October 2010	DF	(Wales) Darren Moss	(Wales) Bangor City	27 January 2011	
15 April 2011	FW	(England) Paul Mullin	Retired		
