= 2011–12 Morecambe F.C. season =

Morecambe
2011–12 season
- Chairman: Peter McGuigan
- Manager: Jim Bentley
- Stadium: Globe Arena
- League Two: 15th
- FA Cup: First Round
- League Cup: Second Round
- League Trophy: Second Round
- Biggest win: Morecambe 6–0 Crawley Town; 10 September 2011
- Biggest defeat: Swindon Town 3–0 Morecambe; 17 December 2011
Home colours	Away colours
- All statistics correct as of match played 5 May 2012.

During the 2011–12 season, Morecambe F.C. competed in League Two.

== League table ==
Pos	Team	Pld	W	D	L	GF	GA	GD	Pts
13	Bristol Rovers	46	15	12	19	60	70	−10	57
14	Accrington Stanley	46	14	15	17	54	66	−12	57
15	Morecambe	46	14	14	18	63	57	+6	56
16	AFC Wimbledon	46	15	9	22	62	78	−16	54
17	Burton Albion	46	14	12	20	54	81	−27	54

Updated to match(es) played on 5 May 2012. Source: BBC Sport
Rules for classification: 1) Points; 2) Goal difference; 3) Number of goals scored

== Squad statistics ==
=== Appearances and goals ===
No.	Pos	Nat	Player	Total		League Two		FA Cup		League Cup		FL Trophy	
No.	Pos	Nat	Player	Apps	Goals	Apps	Goals	Apps	Goals	Apps	Goals	Apps	Goals
1	GK	(Ireland) EIR	Barry Roche	48	0	44+0	0	1+0	0	2+0	0	1+0	0
2	DF	(England) ENG	Nick Fenton	38	3	35+0	3	1+0	0	1+0	0	1+0	0
6	DF	(Scotland) SCO	Will Haining	44	0	36+4	0	0+1	0	2+0	0	1+0	0
7	MF	(England) ENG	Izak Reid	40	2	26+10	2	1+0	0	2+0	0	1+0	0
8	MF	(England) ENG	Garry Hunter	41	1	30+7	1	1+0	0	2+0	0	1+0	0
9	FW	(England) ENG	Lewis Alessandra	46	4	24+18	4	0+1	0	2+0	0	1+0	0
11	MF	(England) ENG	Kevin Ellison	38	17	26+8	15	1+0	0	1+1	1	0+1	1
14	FW	(England) ENG	Jordan Burrow	19	4	14+5	4	0+0	0	0+0	0	0+0	0
15	DF	(England) ENG	Chris McCready	48	0	46+0	0	1+0	0	1+0	0	0+0	0
16	MF	(England) ENG	Stewart Drummond	42	5	36+2	5	1+0	0	1+1	0	1+0	0
17	MF	(England) ENG	Andrew Fleming	17	2	11+6	2	0+0	0	0+0	0	0+0	0
18	MF	(Scotland) SCO	Gary McDonald	46	3	39+3	3	1+0	0	2+0	0	0+1	0
19	DF	(England) ENG	Laurence Wilson	34	6	30+0	5	1+0	1	2+0	0	1+0	0
20	MF	(Zambia) ZAM	Joe Mwasile	6	0	0+6	0	0+0	0	0+0	0	0+0	0
22	DF	(England) ENG	Andy Parrish	42	0	29+9	0	1+0	0	1+1	0	0+1	0
24	DF	(England) ENG	Niall Cowperthwaite	3	0	1+2	0	0+0	0	0+0	0	0+0	0
26	DF	(England) ENG	Dan Parkinson	4	0	0+3	0	0+0	0	0+1	0	0+0	0
27	FW	(England) ENG	Jack Redshaw	11	2	7+4	2	0+0	0	0+0	0	0+0	0
28	MF	(England) ENG	Joe McGee	1	0	0+1	0	0+0	0	0+0	0	0+0	0
30	FW	(England) ENG	Danny Carlton	47	10	34+10	9	1+0	0	2+0	1	0+0	0
Players featured for Morecambe but left before the end of the season:
27	DF	(England) ENG	Kieran Charnock	6	0	0+4	0	0+0	0	1+0	0	1+0	0
29	FW	(Wales) WAL	Jason Price	19	2	12+6	2	0+0	0	0+0	0	1+0	0
10	FW	(England) ENG	Phil Jevons	30	5	14+13	4	0+1	0	0+1	0	1+0	1
Players featured for Morecambe on loan this season and returned to their parent club:
12	FW	(England) ENG	Craig Curran	7	1	6+1	1	0+0	0	0+0	0	0+0	0
25	GK	(Scotland) SCO	Chris Kettings	2	0	2+0	0	0+0	0	0+0	0	0+0	0
3	DF	(Ireland) EIR	Sean McGinty	4	0	4+0	0	0+0	0	0+0	0	0+0	0

=== Top scorers ===
Place	Position	Nation	Number	Name	League Two	FA Cup	League Cup	FL Trophy	Total
1	MF	(England)	11	Kevin Ellison	15	0	1	1	17
2	FW	(England)	30	Danny Carlton	9	0	1	0	10
3	DF	(England)	19	Laurence Wilson	5	1	0	0	6
4	MF	(England)	16	Stewart Drummond	5	0	0	0	5
=	FW	(England)	10	Phil Jevons	4	0	0	1	5
6	FW	(England)	9	Lewis Alessandra	4	0	0	0	4
=	FW	(England)	14	Jordan Burrow	4	0	0	0	4
8	FW	(England)	2	Nick Fenton	3	0	0	0	3
=	MF	(Scotland)	18	Gary McDonald	3	0	0	0	3
10	FW	(Wales)	29	Jason Price	2	0	0	0	2
=	MF	(England)	17	Andrew Fleming	2	0	0	0	2
=	MF	(England)	7	Izak Reid	2	0	0	0	2
=	FW	(England)	27	Jack Redshaw	2	0	0	0	2
14	MF	(England)	8	Garry Hunter	1	0	0	0	1
=	FW	(England)	12	Craig Curran	1	0	0	0	1
				TOTALS	62	1	2	2	67

=== Disciplinary record ===
Number	Nation	Position	Name	League Two		FA Cup		League Cup		FL Trophy		Total	
Number	Nation	Position	Name	Yellow card	Red card	Yellow card	Red card	Yellow card	Red card	Yellow card	Red card	Yellow card	Red card
2	(England)	DF	Nick Fenton	5	0	0	0	0	0	1	0	6	0
30	(England)	FW	Danny Carlton	5	0	0	0	0	0	0	0	5	0
17	(England)	MF	Andrew Fleming	5	0	0	0	0	0	0	0	5	0
15	(England)	DF	Chris McCready	5	0	0	0	0	0	0	0	5	0
6	(Scotland)	DF	Will Haining	4	0	0	0	0	0	1	0	5	0
16	(England)	MF	Stewart Drummond	4	0	0	0	0	0	0	0	4	0
11	(England)	MF	Kevin Ellison	3	0	0	0	0	0	1	0	4	0
19	(England)	DF	Laurence Wilson	4	0	0	0	0	0	0	0	4	0
8	(England)	MF	Garry Hunter	4	0	0	0	0	0	0	0	4	0
29	(Wales)	FW	Jason Price	2	0	0	0	0	0	0	0	2	0
3	(Republic of Ireland)	DF	Sean McGinty	2	0	0	0	0	0	0	0	2	0
10	(England)	FW	Phil Jevons	1	1	0	0	0	0	0	0	1	1
22	(England)	DF	Andy Parrish	1	0	0	0	0	0	0	0	1	0
2	(England)	DF	Nick Fenton	1	0	0	0	0	0	0	0	1	0
1	(Republic of Ireland)	GK	Barry Roche	1	0	0	0	0	0	0	0	1	0
14	(England)	FW	Jordan Burrow	1	0	0	0	0	0	0	0	1	0
18	(Scotland)	MF	Gary McDonald	1	0	0	0	0	0	0	0	1	0
9	(England)	FW	Lewis Alessandra	1	0	0	0	0	0	0	0	1	0
			TOTALS	50	1	0	0	0	0	3	0	53	1

== Results ==
=== Pre-season friendlies ===
12 July 2011	Raith Rovers	1–1	Morecambe	Stark's Park
19:30	Baird 80'		Alessandra 75'

16 July 2011	Morecambe	1–1	Blackburn Rovers	Globe Arena
15:00	Jevons 25'		Formica 74'

19 July 2011	Morecambe	2–1	Carlisle United	Globe Arena
19:45	Charnock 76'; Jevons 81'		Loy 22'

23 July 2011	Morecambe	1–1	Derby County	Globe Arena
19:30	Wilson 76' (pen.)		Fenton 65' (o.g.)

25 July 2011	Airbus UK Broughton	1–0	Morecambe	The Airfield
19:30	Sheridan 37'

27 July 2011	Morecambe	0–3	Preston North End	Globe Arena
19:45			Daley 32'; Proctor 48'; Miller 80'

30 July 2011	Southport	2–3	Morecambe	Haig Avenue
15:00

1 August 2011	Morecambe	0–2	Manchester United XI	Globe Arena
19:45			Drinkwater 58'; Lingard 63'	Attendance: 2,912

=== League Two ===
6 August 2011 1	Morecambe	0–1	Barnet	Globe Arena
15:00			Byrne 76'	Attendance: 1,874

13 August 2011 2	Hereford United	0–3	Morecambe	Edgar Street
15:00			Carlton 37'; Jevons 45'; Drummond 65'	Attendance: 2,045

16 August 2011 3	Cheltenham Town	1–2	Morecambe	Abbey Business Stadium
19:45	Goulding 84'		Fenton 61'; Ellison 90+2'	Attendance: 2,035

20 August 2011 4	Morecambe	2–0	Aldershot Town	Globe Arena
15:00	Ellison 8'; Alessandra 79'			Attendance: 1,833

27 August 2011 5	Northampton Town	0–2	Morecambe	Sixfields Stadium
15:00			Jevons 15'; Wilson 25' (pen.)	Attendance: 4,016

3 September 2011 6	Morecambe	1–1	Bradford City	Globe Arena
15:00	Reid 57'		Hannah 90+3'	Attendance: 4,025

10 September 2011 7	Morecambe	6–0	Crawley Town	Globe Arena
15:00	Carlton 9', 62', 72'; Fenton 22'; Ellison 69'; Wilson 83' (pen.)			Attendance: 2,054

13 September 2011 8	Macclesfield Town	1–1	Morecambe	Moss Rose
19:45	Tomlinson 1'		Carlton 16'	Attendance: 1,527

17 September 2011 9	Dagenham & R	1–2	Morecambe	Victoria Road
15:00	Lee 73'		Carlton 47'; Drummond 54'	Attendance: 1,732

24 September 2011 10	Morecambe	2–3	Bristol Rovers	Globe Arena
15:00	Price 57'; Ellison 63'		Bolger 27'; Mcgleish 65'; Anyinsah 74'	Attendance: 2,583

1 October 2011 11	Torquay United	1–1	Morecambe	Plainmoor
15:00	Mansell 62'		Ellison 82'	Attendance: 2,207

8 October 2011 12	Morecambe	1–2	Wimbledon	Globe Arena
15:00	Drummond 20'		Midson 35'; Jolley 83'	Attendance: 2,631

15 October 2011 13	Southend United	1–1	Morecambe	Roots Hall
15:00	Drummond 83' (o.g.)		Jevons 53'	Attendance: 9,782

22 October 2011 14	Port Vale	0–4	Morecambe	Vale Park
15:00			Price 27'; Alessandra 37'; Wilson 87' (pen.); Fleming 90'	Attendance: 5,004

25 October 2011 15	Morecambe	3–3	Rotherham	Globe Arena
19:45	McDonald 3'; Wilson 28' (pen.), 37' (pen.)		Grabban 39' (pen.); Evans 58'; Revell 64'	Attendance: 3,012

29 October 2011 16	Morecambe	2–1	Gillingham	Globe Arena
15:00	Hunter 8'; Ellison 68'		Nouble 90+5' (pen.)	Attendance: 2,067

5 November 2011 17	Plymouth Argyle	1–1	Morecambe	Home Park
15:00	Walton 31'		Fenton 90+4'	Attendance: 5,409

19 November 2011 18	Morecambe	1–2	Crewe Alexandra	Globe Arena
15:00	Ellison 69'		Powell 79'; Clayton 90+5'	Attendance: 2,169

26 November 2011 19	Shrewsbury Town	2–0	Morecambe	Greenhous Meadow
15:00	Wroe 39' (pen.); Wright 88'			Attendance: 5,623

10 December 2011 20	Morecambe	0–0	Oxford United	Globe Arena
15:00				Attendance: 1,914

17 December 2011 21	Swindon Town	3–0	Morecambe	The County Ground
15:00	Jervis 27'; De Vita 45+2'; Murray 76'			Attendance: 7,116

26 December 2011 22	Morecambe	1–2	Accrington Stanley	Globe Arena
15:00	Drummond 55'		Stockley 34'; Hughes 75'	Attendance: 2,569

31 December 2011 23	Morecambe	2–2	Burton Albion	Globe Arena
13:00	Alessandra 31'; McDonald 68'		Kee 38'; Zola 53'	Attendance: 1,810

2 January 2012 24	Crewe Alexandra	0–1	Morecambe	Alexandra Stadium
15:00			Ellison 28'	Attendance: 3,840

7 January 2012 25	Morecambe	1–2	Northampton Town	Globe Arena
15:00	Ellison 81'		Johnson 21'; Asante 52'	Attendance: 1,879

14 January 2012 26	Bradford City	2–2	Morecambe	Valley Parade
15:00	Ravenhill 60'; Seip 89'		Davies 86' (o.g.); Ellison 90+1'	Attendance: 10,065

21 January 2012 27	Morecambe	1–2	Torquay United	Globe Arena
15:00	Jevons 88'		Ellis 17'; Stevens 81'	Attendance: 1,800

11 February 2012 28	Bristol Rovers	2–1	Morecambe	Memorial Stadium
15:00	Brown 57'; McGleish 75' (pen.); Lund (yellow card) 77'; Richards (yellow card) 90+3'		Fenton (yellow card) 40'; Drummond (yellow card) 76'; Ellison 88'	Attendance: 5,381

14 February 2012 29	Morecambe	1–0	Macclesfield Town	Globe Arena
19:45	Carlton 56'		Marshall (yellow card) 62'; Bateson (yellow card) 64'	Attendance: 1,316

18 February 2012 30	AFC Wimbledon	1–1	Morecambe	Kingsmeadow
15:00	Moore (yellow card) 34'; Yussuff 75'		Fleming (yellow card) 50'; McDonald 52'; Wilson (yellow card) 85'; Hunter (yellow card) 90+2'	Attendance: 3,964

22 February 2012 31	Crawley Town	1–1	Morecambe	Broadfield Stadium
19:45	Neilson 49'		Fleming 21'; McCready (yellow card) 82'; Burrow (yellow card) 88'	Attendance: 2,184

25 February 2012 32	Morecambe	1–0	Southend United	Globe Arena
15:00	Fleming (yellow card) 64'; Burrow 75'		Barker (yellow card) 78'	Attendance: 1,971

28 February 2012 33	Morecambe	1–2	Dagenham & Redbridge	Globe Arena
19:45	Ellison 26'		Elito 13' (yellow card) 65'; Scott 71'	Attendance: 1,246

3 March 2012 34	Aldershot Town	1–0	Morecambe	Recreation Ground (Aldershot)
15:00	Payne (yellow card) 17'; Madjo 26'; Herd (yellow card) 75'; Mekki (yellow card) 79'; Brown (red card) 90+3'		Haining (yellow card) 87'; McDonald (yellow card) 89'	Attendance: 2,381

6 March 2012 35	Morecambe	3–1	Cheltenham Town	Globe Arena
19:45	Ellison 32' 55'; Reid 48'; Hunter (yellow card) 57'		Duffy 13'	Attendance: 1,207

10 March 2012 36	Morecambe	0–1	Hereford United	Globe Arena
15:00			Taylor 27'	Attendance: 1,653

17 March 2012 37	Barnet	0–2	Morecambe	Underhill Stadium
15:00	Dennehy (yellow card) 85'		Ellison 42'; Drummond (yellow card) 61'; Redshaw 63'	Attendance: 1,536

20 March 2012 38	Accrington Stanley	1–1	Morecambe	Crown Ground
19:45	Murphy 14'; Joyce (yellow card) 62'		Carlton (yellow card) 29' (goal) 70'	Attendance: 1,924

24 March 2012 39	Morecambe	0–1	Shrewsbury Town	Globe Arena
15:00	Ellison (yellow card) 74'; McCready (yellow card) 88'		Collins 68'; Taylor (red card) 80'; Richards (yellow card) 88'	Attendance: 2,175

31 March 2012 40	Oxford United	1–2	Morecambe	Kassam Stadium
15:00	Rendell 5'		Curran 3'; Drummond 74'	Attendance: 7,023

6 April 2012 41	Morecambe	0–1	Swindon Town	Globe Arena
15:00			Benson 46' (yellow card) 47'	Attendance: 3,011

9 April 2012 42	Burton Albion	3–2	Morecambe	Pirelli Stadium
15:00	Bolder 6' (yellow card) 56'; Webster 39'; Richards (yellow card) 45'; Phillips (yellow card) 84'; Palmer 87'; Zola (yellow card) 90+3'		Burrow 45+3'; Carlton 49' (yellow card) 66'	Attendance: 2,329

14 April 2012 43	Morecambe	0–0	Port Vale	Globe Arena
15:00				Attendance: 2,210

21 April 2012 44	Rotherham United	3–2	Morecambe	Don Valley Stadium
15:00	Grabban 21' 90+1'; Taylor 48'; Cresswell (yellow card) 45' (yellow-red card) 74'		Burrow 39'; Redshaw 75' (pen.)	Attendance: 2,876

28 April 2012 45	Morecambe	2–2	Plymouth Argyle	Globe Arena
15:00	McCready (yellow card) 35'; Burrow 51'; Hunter (yellow card) 59'; Alessandra 70'		Young 4'; Purse 83'	Attendance: 2,313

5 May 2012 46	Gillingham	2–0	Morecambe	Priestfield Stadium
15:00	Lee 18' (yellow card) 25' (goal) 76'			Attendance: 4,382

=== FA Cup ===
13 November 2011 Round 1	Morecambe	1–2	Sheffield Wednesday	Globe Arena
15:00	Wilson 62' (pen.)		Lines 18'; O'Grady 52'	Attendance: 4,160

=== League Cup ===
9 August 2011 Round 1	Barnsley	0–2	Morecambe	Oakwell
19:45			Carlton 49'; Ellison 86'	Attendance: 4,331

23 August 2011 Round 2	Millwall	2–0	Morecambe	The Den
19:45	Bouazza 34'; Mkandawire 45+2'			Attendance: 3,443

=== Football League Trophy ===
4 October 2011 Round 1	Morecambe	2–3	Preston North End	Globe Arena
19:30				Attendance: 4,385

== Transfers ==
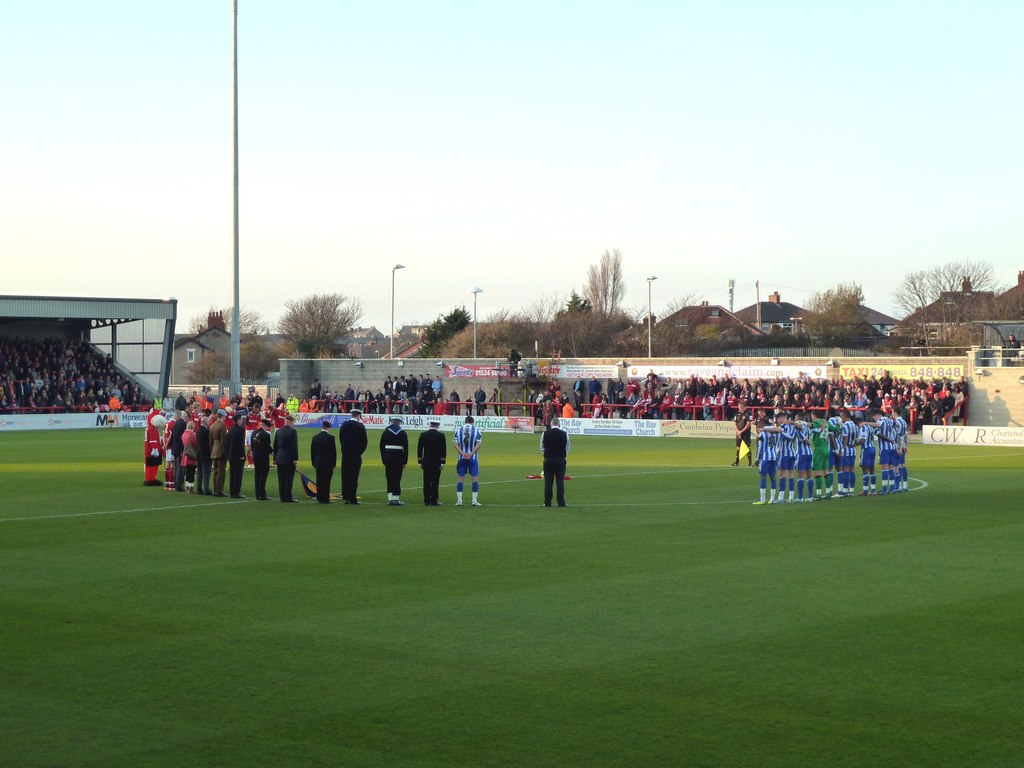
Players and supporters observe a minute's silence prior to Morecambe's FA Cup match against Sheffield Wednesday on Remembrance Sunday.

Players transferred in
Date	Pos.	Name	Previous club	Fee	Ref.
1 June 2011	MF	(England) Kevin Ellison	(England) Rotherham United	Free Transfer	
18 June 2011	MF	(England) Izak Reid	(England) Macclesfield Town	Fee yet to be decided	
23 June 2011	FW	(England) Lewis Alessandra	(England) Oldham Athletic	Free Transfer	
23 June 2011	MF	(Scotland) Gary McDonald	(Scotland) Hamilton Academical	Free Transfer	
1 August 2011	DF	(England) Nick Fenton	(England) Rotherham United	Free	
1 August 2011	GK	(England) Shaun Routledge	(England) Oldham Athletic	Free	
3 September 2011	FW	(Wales) Jason Price	(England) Barnet	Free	
21 January 2012	FW	(England) Jordan Burrow	(England) Chesterfield	Free	
24 January 2012	FW	(England) Jack Redshaw	(England) Altrincham	Undisclosed	
Players loaned in
Date from	Pos.	Name	From	Date to	Ref.
23 January 2012	GK	(Scotland) Chris Kettings	(England) Blackpool	End of season	
27 February 2012	DF	(Republic of Ireland) Sean McGinty	(England) Manchester United	13 March 2012	
22 March 2012	FW	(England) Craig Curran	(England) Carlisle United	End of season	
Players loaned out
Date from	Pos.	Name	To	Date to	Ref.
24 November 2011	DF	(England) Kieran Charnock	(England) Fleetwood Town	3 January 2012	
17 December 2011	MF	(England) Dan Parkinson	(Wales) Colwyn Bay	17 December 2012	
26 January 2012	FW	(England) Jack Redshaw	(England) Altrincham	26 February 2012	
24 February 2012	MF	(England) Dan Parkinson	(England) Vauxhall Motors	24 March 2012	
Players transferred out
Date	Pos.	Name	Subsequent club	Fee	Ref.
Players released
Date	Pos.	Name	Subsequent club	Join date	Ref.
13 May 2011	DF	(Northern Ireland) Tony Capaldi	(England) Oxford United	1 July 2011	
7 June 2011	MF	(England) Craig Stanley	(England) Bristol Rovers	1 July 2011 (Bosman)	
1 July 2011	FW	(England) Stuart Hendrie	(England) Hinckley United	22 July 2011	
1 July 2011	GK	(England) Laurie Walker	(England) Kettering Town	2 August 2011	
1 July 2011	DF	(England) Andy Holdsworth	(England) Alfreton Town	31 August 2011	
1 July 2011	MF	(England) Scott Brown	(England) Fleetwood Town	8 August 2011	
1 July 2011	MF	(England) Chris Shuker	(England) Port Vale	14 January 2012	
1 July 2011	MF	(England) Neil Wainwright	(England) Kendal Town	23 September 2011	
5 July 2011	MF	(England) Adam Rundle	(England) Darlington	5 July 2011	
6 January 2012	DF	(England) Kieran Charnock	(England) Fleetwood Town	6 January 2012	
1 March 2012	GK	(England) Shaun Routledge	(England) Workington	1 March 2012	
16 March 2012	FW	(Wales) Jason Price	(England) Guiseley	16 March 2012	
3 April 2012	FW	(England) Phil Jevons	Unattached		
6 April 2012	DF	(England) Paul Scott	Unattached		

== Awards ==
End of Season Awards	Winner
Fans' Club Player of the Year	Andy Parrish
Players' Player of the Year	Chris McCready
Shrimpsvoices Player of the Year	Chris McCready
Visitor Player of the Year	Chris McCready
Junior Reds Player of the Year	Kevin Ellison
Community Sports Player of the Year	Stewart Drummond
Under 18's Player of the Year	Ryan Winder
Under 17's Player of the Year	Will Bell
Goal of the Season	Kevin Ellison vs Aldershot Town
