= Brazen =

Brazen may refer to:

- Made of brass
- HMS Brazen, various ships of the British Royal Navy
- Brazen Animation, an American studio based in Texas
- Brazen class destroyer, consisting of four Royal Navy destroyers
- Brazen (TV series), a British television show
- "Brazen (Weep)", a song by Skunk Anansie
- Captain Brazen, one of two main characters in the 1706 play The Recruiting Officer
- Brazen (film), an adaptation of the Nora Roberts novel Brazen Virtue

== See also ==
- brazed
