= David Teacher =

British World War II veteran (1923–2024)

David Teacher MBE
- Birth name: David Leon Teacher
- Born: 29 December 1923 Hastings, Sussex, England
- Died: 24 May 2024 (aged 100) Salford, Greater Manchester, England
- Allegiance: United Kingdom

David Leon Teacher MBE (29 December 1923 – 24 May 2024) was a British RAF veteran of the RAF Regiment, serving in France, Belgium, the Netherlands and Germany.

== Biography ==
Teacher was born on 29 December 1923 in Hastings, Sussex. He served as an LAC2 with an RAF Beach Unit, which was part of Combined Operations forces during the first wave of the Normandy landings on Juno Beach.

In late 2023, as Teacher (living in a residential care home for veterans, Broughton House Veteran Care Village) approached his 100th birthday, British broadcaster and filmmaker, Richard Alexander self-published the first editions of the finished work, entitled No Ordinary Tuesday via Kickstarter where it was successfully funded. In an unusual addition to printed biographies, Alexander incorporated QR codes throughout, allowing the readers to watch various films and short interviews with Teacher recounting his experiences, anecdotes and memories to camera. To celebrate this milestone, Alexander planned a special surprise for his now-best friend in Ingleton, North Yorkshire; a reunion with the QL, now completely renovated and replete with RAF Beach Unit (part of Combined Operations) markings, access kindly provided by the new owner, Robert Atkinson.

In a 2019 interview, Teacher was quoted as saying ""I enjoyed every minute of it. I enjoyed the comradeship including the hardships, because we all went through it together. I enjoyed my service career immensely, its something I would do again if I had to – I wouldn't hesitate. It was a wonderful way of life, no doubt about it." The same year, broadcaster Alexander released a short film (approx 16 mins ) about Teacher's recent visit to the Netherlands, courtesy of a Dutch charity called 'Het Gooi Bevrijd' (Gooi is an area around Hilversum, and 'bevrijd' is Dutch for 'liberated'). In the film, Teacher expresses his opinion about the Netherlands' superior approach to commemoration and recognition to veterans compared to his home country United Kingdom. Notably, his declaration is shared by other veterans from both the UK (such as Bill WH Price from the Royal Artillery and despatch rider Lewis Banham) and the United States (Bob Izumi, 101st Airborne).

Teacher celebrated his 100th birthday 29 December 2023 with friends and family at Broughton House in Salford, Manchester, receiving a card from warrant officer Steve Garrett of REME on behalf of King Charles III. In an interview with the BBC, screened on the Breakfast Show on BBC1 (30 December 2023), Teacher was quoted as saying "D-Day was a doddle" due to the superior Allied air cover overhead. Regardless, he survived an immense scare when a Luftwaffe aircraft dropped a bomb very close that failed to explode.

Teacher died in Salford on 24 May 2024, at the age of 100.

== Honours ==
Teacher was appointed MBE in the 2012 New Year Honours for services to charitable fundraising.

In 2017 it was revealed that a group of volunteers had raised enough money to organise a modern reprise of Teacher's D-Day landing, consisting of him being driven on the same stretch of sand seventy-three years later. The entire project had been made possible with the support of an owner of a WWII Bedford QL, the same vehicle Teacher had driven ashore through deep water from an LCT landing craft on 6 June 1944.

The entire reenactment was documented by Alexander, with the trip forging a very close friendship between the pair despite the substantial age difference, who continued to visit the continent together repeatedly over the following year with Alexander recording the trips for a planned documentary to be completed with the 75th anniversary of VE Day. However, with the COVID-19 pandemic causing all events and travel plans to be cancelled, and in early 2020, the RAF veteran suffered a fall at home at age 96 and was treated as an in-patient at Royal Oldham Hospital in Lancashire, where he was befriended by a young man who subsequently stole his only contact with his relatives and friends, his mobile phone. According to various newspaper reports, this event amid Teacher's lockdown isolation spurred Alexander on to writing a complete biography of his senior friend's life.

Speaking to the BBC during the birthday celebrations for Teacher, Alexander said the veteran's volunteer work talking to visitors coming to the Imperial War Museum in Manchester, was of "incredible importance to him, because he felt it was important to educate their younger visitors about the perils of war and conflict".

Salford City Council had collaborated with Teacher's long-time friend and carer, Richard Alexander (see above), with a view to screening a living tribute to the Juno Beach veteran, intended to be projected onto the front of their council building in the city for D-Day commemorations & celebrations on 6 June, 2024. Sadly, with Teacher's death only 13 days before, Alexander had to cut an entirely different film, which was successfully screened for the public on the arranged date.
