= Richard Alexander (TV presenter) =

British actor

- Born: Wibsey, Bradford
- Occupation(s): Writer, filmmaker, director, producer, presenter, actor
- Years active: 2003 – present

Richard Alexander is a British actor, writer and broadcaster who has hosted talk shows, played characters in comedy programming and made documentary films detailing how ordinary people cope with serious illness and loss.

== Early life ==
Alexander was born in Wibsey, Bradford in the UK and went to both the first school and middle school (as Richard Milnes) in the area Buttershaw where the feature film directed by Alan Clarke, Rita, Sue and Bob Too was filmed (although he never attended the upper school). At age 13 he attended Hipperholme Grammar School, where he shared the same class, and subsequently became acquainted with, Danny McNamara of Embrace – later directing and producing the promotional video for their single "Wake Up Call".

Alexander later studied under the Electrical Engineering Department at the University of Bradford in conjunction with the National Media Museum (formerly the National Museum of Photography, Film and Television) achieving a BSc (Hons) in 'Electronic Imaging & Media Communications'. While at university, Alexander started making music videos for various local and national performers, starting doing so in 1993, early into his degree.

While finishing his studies, Alexander directed a short film about football featuring John Helm, Eddie Gray, Chris Kamara, Paul Hart and others, which earned him a recommendation as a Director of Photography for an independent project about Little Germany in Bradford.

== Television ==
Over the past few years, Alexander has appeared in various programmes on both terrestrial and satellite TV. At present, he is featured on a show called BRAZEN an eclectic mix of professionally shot reality TV, and more amateur-style footage, along with animated satire and parody. The animations featured in the show are aimed at deriding reality TV, whilst the live-action footage purports to promote the concept. Another show, called Rubbernecker (broadcast on Nuts TV in the UK) features him as the narrator/host.

Alexander has worked with Men and Motors, a digital channel in the UK operated by ITV plc, having appeared in over 150 shows on their channel in the last 5 years. His first appearance was on his own creation, a reality clubbing show called UK Uncovered in which he and other presenters interviewed everyday people in the environment or nightclubs. While most of the presenters used their real names, Alexander adopted the moniker Ricardo, citing on his website that the character is part of his personality, but "just with the volume dialled up to 11..."

This simple formula was relatively successful, which resulted in a further five more series of the same show, including a version incorporating Nuts magazines' search for a new model, listed as "UK Uncovered vs The Nuts Babe Search". The later incarnations mirror a technique first used in BRAZEN, specifically where the show's voiceover is done by a computer-generated personality but according to feedback found in various sources, this unique approach is not always popular with viewers (an innovation unusual at the time that was portentous of future trends as it is now widely employed by millions of social media posts.).

Later, in 2009, Alexander teamed up with Alki David, owner of video-on-demand broadcaster, FilmOn, to produce a series called 24-7 Clubber, with Alexander's company reprising their own model of footage acquisition via UK nightclubs. Complications around the business model stalled the development between the producer and streaming platform, and the dedicated channel has subsequently disappeared.

Alexander hosted a current affairs show for a younger audience on ITV1, called Late Attitude. He has also produced several other series, such as The Steam Room, Bak2Skool, and he appeared in a mockumentary TV series entitled The Randomball Run. He has written and narrated several clip-shows, such as Rubbernecker and The Range of Strange, as well as a mini-series called Glamour Eyes which examines the lengths people are willing to go to in order to achieve celebrity or instant fame.

== Other work ==
Alexander worked on a (relatively) low-budget digital project between 1997 and 2000, which was to be distributed internationally but the deal was held up by complications, at which point he left the otherwise-completed project to pursue his TV ambitions. He was director of photography, film editor and assistant producer on the feature-length film, at the time titled Fluffy Little Bunnies – later re-titled Bad Day which went on to win 'Best of the Fest' at ReelHeArt International Film Festival. Alexander was also featured in a documentary on Discovery Health, UK called Who's the Daddy, a one-hour film following people trying to track down their biological fathers, which endured some national criticism for the way paternity tests were handled.

Alexander switched media roles from television presenter to filmmaker, and produced a variety of mostly sporting-based shorts and films shot on locations such as Mongolia, Cambodia and even inside the Canadian Arctic Circle as far north as Tuktoyaktuk on the banks of the Arctic Ocean. This switch has also seen him produce many works associated with Kevin Webber, a merchant banker diagnosed with stage 4 prostate cancer. Webber has co-written a work entitled Dead Man Running with BBC presenter Mark Church, based on Alexander's short film released online about 12 months prior to the release of the book.

In 2016, Alexander met a Second World War veteran at an annual historical reenactment show called The Yorkshire Wartime Experience in Bradford, making a short from his visit where he volunteered to film a proposed re-enactment of a specific Normandy Landings moment (see Publishing, below). About two years later, Alexander created a short film detailing how a group of volunteers and enthusiasts in an area in North Holland called Gooi have raised sponsorship to bring Allied veterans to the Netherlands for Liberation Day (similar to VE Day around Europe).

== Publishing ==
On 6 June 2017, Alexander filmed David Teacher MBE, a D-Day veteran who landed on Juno Beach as part of the first assault wave in a Bedford QL 3-ton truck, using a similar vehicle on the same stretch of sand as 1944. The owner of the QL in 2017, Craig Keeble, also owned a transport company and had previously supplied the vehicle for many historic TV shows and films (such as SS-GB and Home Fires volunteered to take it back to Normandy to allow Teacher a chance to repeat his once in a lifetime experience.

The special event, co-funded using donations via crowd-funding website Just Giving, was a success with Alexander and others providing their time and skills free of charge.

As a direct result of the trip, the two men became close friends and returned to Europe frequently since, with Alexander recording the trips for a planned documentary to be completed with the 75th anniversary of VE Day. However, with the COVID-19 pandemic causing all events and travel plans to be cancelled, and in early 2020, the RAF veteran suffered a fall at home at age 96 and was treated as an in-patient at Royal Oldham Hospital in Lancashire, where he was befriended by a young man who subsequently stole his only contact with his relatives and friends, his mobile phone. This event amid Teacher's lockdown isolation spurred Alexander on to writing a complete biography of his senior friend's life.

In late 2023s, as Teacher – now living in a residential care home for veterans, Broughton House Veteran Care Village – approached his 100th birthday, Alexander self-published the first editions of the finished work, entitled No Ordinary Tuesday via Kickstarter where it was successfully funded. In an unusual addition to printed biographies, Alexander incorporated QR codes throughout, allowing the readers to watch various films and short interviews with Teacher recounting his experiences, anecdotes and memories to camera. To celebrate this milestone, Alexander planned a special surprise for his friend in Ingleton, North Yorkshire; a reunion with the QL, now completely renovated and replete with RAF Beach Unit (part of Combined Operations) markings, access provided by the new owner, Chris Atkinson.

On 29 December 2023, Teacher celebrated reaching the age of 100 at his care home with friends, family and supporters, some of whom came from as far as Texas and the Netherlands. Present in uniform to award Teacher the traditional 100th birthday card from King Charles III was Warrant Officer Steve Garrett of REME who had previously been an important part of the initial return to Normandy in 2017, as his department had custom made a special lift for Teacher, who is a wheelchair user. WO Garrett said that future generations can continue to learn from the veteran's reflections on conflict. The chief executive of Broughton House, Karen Miller, said that WWII veterans are an inspiration and that after his military term, Teacher continued to "dedicate his life to serve others, not only through his charitable work but also by sharing with the younger generation the values of friendship, duty and service."

== Music ==
In addition to more recent music promos, Alexander produced many from local Yorkshire artists while still at university, including Christian rock band, Blessed Rain, one for Bradford-based, Kitsch (formed by members of Poppy Factory), a trio that included Mickey Dale at the time, who later joined Embrace. Around 2012, Alexander started documenting the life of Manchester-based rapper and vocalist, MC Tunes. The musician had previously worked with 808 State on his first singles and album, then later as frontman for indie rap-rock crossover band, Dust Junkys. With the discovery of the musician's long-lost master tapes for his second album, Alexander created a short called in 2014 called 23 Years Late: Damage By Stereo.

== Charity work ==
Over the years, Alexander has remained involved with various charitable concerns, having been strongly influenced in 1996 by the Rotary Club approach to helping others. He credits this to a Ripponden-based businessman called Derek Rollinson who was a Rotarian, and Alexander's Prince's Trust mentor. As such, Alexander has helped with Children In Need, Prostate Cancer UK, Macmillan Cancer Support, Mind (charity) and Age UK among others.

== Selected filmography ==
- An Evening with Tim Staffell (2023) Documentary – Director
- Teacher versus School-kids (2021) Documentary (Biography) – Director
- The Arctic: Ultra Maximus (2021) Documentary (Sports) – Director
- Liberation in the Netherlands (2019) Documentary (short) – Director
- Defiance: Dead Man Running (2019) Documentary (short) – Director
- Cambodia: No Limits (2019) Documentary (short) – Director
- Andrew Murray: Minus 40 in Mongolia (2016) Documentary (Sports) – Director/Interviewer
- The Range of Strange (2013) TV Mini-Series – Director/Narrator
- UK Uncovered : Mashup (2012) TV Series – Host (as Ricardo)/Producer
- Glamour Eyes (2012) TV Mini-Series – Director/Narrator
- 24-7 Clubber (2010) TV Series – Director/Producer
- UK Uncovered vs. The Nuts Babe Search (2008) TV series – Producer/Host (as Ricardo)
- RUBBERNECKER (2008) TV series – Producer/Writer/Voice
- BRAZEN (2008) TV series – Producer/Host/Writer/Voice
- The "C" Word (2007) documentary – Producer/Director
- The Steam Room: with Michelle Marsh (2007) TV Series – Co-Host/Producer
- Bak2Skool (2006) TV Series – Master Bates/Evil Ricardo
- UK Uncovered : Full On (2005) TV Series – Host (as Ricardo)/Producer
- The Randomball Run 2004 (2004) TV Series – Himself
- The Steam Room: with Jo Guest (2004) TV Series – Narrator/Producer
- Who's the Daddy? (2004) documentary – Himself
- UK Uncovered 2 (2004) TV Series – Host (as Ricardo)/Producer
- Late Attitude (2004) TV Series – Host
- Summer Party (2003) TV Series – Host
- UK Uncovered (2002) TV Series – Host (as Ricardo)/Producer
