= Auchen Castle Hotel =

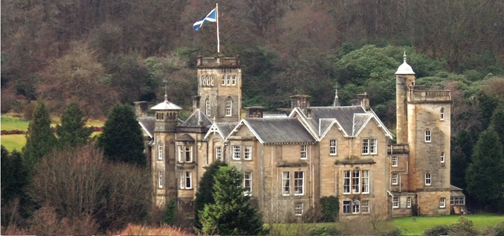
- The 19th century house at Auchen Castle is now a wedding venue
- Interactive map of the Auchen Castle Hotel area

General information
- Location: Beattock, Moffat
- Coordinates: 55.3275°N 3.4792°W
- Completed: 1840s (as country house)
- Opening: 1950s (as a hotel)

Other information
- Number of suites: 26

Website
- auchencastle.co.uk

Auchen Castle is a 19th-century country house and wedding venue near Moffat, Dumfries and Galloway, Scotland. With 26 bedrooms, a private lake and falconry school, it has a 5-star rating by the Scottish tourist board. The house, which shares its name with the nearby 13th-century Auchen Castle, has previously hosted guests such as the Beatles and Barbara Cartland and is now a wedding venue which has attracted several celebrity weddings. It stands within 34 acres of landscaped grounds that include Italian-inspired gardens and a private lake.

== History ==
The original Auchen Castle castle, now a ruin, dates from 1220 and was built by Sir Humphrey de Kirkpatrick when he was Senestal of Annandale. The Kirkpatrick family, close allies of Robert the Bruce and King Robert, would have been entertained at Auchen Castle often. The Kirkpatrick clan has long since moved from their seat at Auchen Castle and their estates and holdings came under the ownership of the Clan Johnstone. The Johnstones remain Lords of Annandale to this day.

The country house on the estate, also known as Auchen Castle, was largely completed in 1849 by General Johnstone. It reflects an Egyptian revival architectural style, inspired by his service under Sir Ralph Abercromby during the Egyptian campaign of 1801.

Through marriage, the castle was inherited by Sir William Younger, 1st Baronet, of Auchen Castle of the Youngers brewery family. The castle still maintains many original features; such as the Victorian spring water catchments and reservoirs that supply the castle. In the castle grounds there are a number of unusual species of trees and plants, brought to the estate over the centuries.

The site is recognised for its historical and architectural importance, and the medieval castle ruins are designated as a Scheduled Monument (SM683), while the 19th-century mansion that now operates as hotel is a listed building.

== Weddings ==
Auchen Castle Hotel is now used as a wedding destination. In 2007, it was the venue for the wedding of model Michelle Marsh to footballer Will Haining, which appeared in OK! magazine. It also hosted ITV's Good Morning Britain which broadcast four weddings live on the lead up to Valentines day in 2016.

== Architecture ==
Auchen Castle is known for its architectural curiosities and its design is layered in symbolism, earning it the nickname, "Egypt". General Johnstone, who built the castle as it is today, served under Sir Ralph Abercromby in Egypt against the French in 1801 and it is thought that the design of the castle and the estate were laid out to show the positions of units in the Battle of the Nile. The floor plan is made up of two wings, running East to West and North to South. These two wings connect three corners of an isosceles triangle. At each of these corners there are three rooms of a similar design, with an octagonal box window in each with five sides of the octagon, showing on the outside, but the interior three sides are missing. This rule of three applies throughout the castle. At the entrance, in the form of three steps with two Corinthian pillars lead into the castle via a checkered floor, symbolic of the entrance to King Solomon's temple. Opposite the entrance there are a set of 21 steps, ascending a stepped pyramid shaped garden and surmounted by two sphinxes. When the rule of three within the castle itself is applied to this, and the number of steps is divided by it, the number is seven. This is the number of stages in the construction of a ziggurat, which is the original name for a pyramid.
