= Dan Parkinson =

Dan Parkinson may refer to:

- Dan Parkinson (footballer) (born 1992), English footballer
- Dan Parkinson (author) (1935–2001), American author
