= Rubbernecker (TV series) =

- Created by: Richard Alexander
- Country of origin: United Kingdom
- No. of episodes: 30

Original release
- Release: April 2008 – present

Rubbernecker is a reality television show that is hosted by Richard Alexander, currently broadcasting on Nuts TV, the Freeview/cable/satellite channel in the UK, operated by Turner Broadcasting.

It features a variety of genres of reality clips, such as extreme sports accidents, world record attempts, bizarre TV commercials, CCTV footage featuring employees caught on camera in the office, user generated content, and news-style reports of unusual events and people from around the world. With a somewhat left field and playful approach to its subjects or featured articles, it has two distinct versions : pre-Watershed (television) and an Uncut version for post-Watershed (television).
