= Brazen (TV series) =

- Created by: Richard Alexander
- Country of origin: United Kingdom
- No. of episodes: 20

Original release
- Release: December 2007

BRAZEN is a British television show that was filmed on location around the entire United Kingdom. Aired on Men and Motors cable/satellite channel in the United Kingdom, operated by ITV Digital. The programme refers to itself as 'Brazen Central', but can be found in the listings as 'BRAZEN'.

A combination of pranks, reality TV interviews, 2D animations and stop-motion animations, apparent home video clips and User-generated content and sketches. Often cited as the follow-up to the notorious UK Uncovered, the series disappointed many fans of the earlier series due its over-reliance on graphics and the fact that its content was much tamer and seemingly "cleaned up".
