= Paul Hendrie =

Scottish footballer (born 1954)

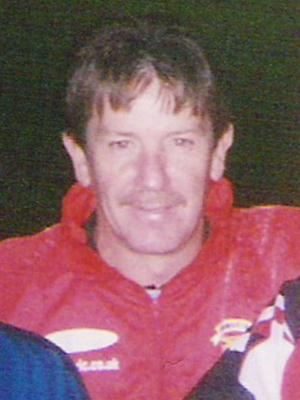

Personal information
- Full name: Paul Hendrie
- Date of birth: 27 March 1954 (age 72)
- Place of birth: Glasgow, Scotland
- Height: 5 ft 6 in (1.68 m)
- Position: Midfielder

Youth career
- –1972: Kirkintilloch Rob Roy

Senior career*
Years	Team	Apps	(Gls)
1972–1976	Birmingham City	22	(1)
1976–1977	Portland Timbers	37	(1)
1977–1979	Bristol Rovers	30	(1)
1979–1984	Halifax Town	187	(11)
1984–1989	Stockport County	121	(5)

Managerial career
- 1991–1995: Redditch United
- 1995–2000: Tamworth
- * Club domestic league appearances and goals

Paul Hendrie (born 27 March 1954) is a Scottish former football midfielder who made nearly 400 professional appearances. His son, midfielder Lee Hendrie, made a late substitute appearance for England in 1998. Another son, Stuart, played league football for Morecambe. Hendrie's nephew, John Hendrie, is also a Scottish former professional footballer.

== Playing career ==
Paul Hendrie had been playing in his native Scotland in the junior set up at Kirkintilloch Rob Roy. Hendrie moved South in March 1972 to join Birmingham City. He was unable to establish himself as a regular in the first team at St. Andrews and left in 1976 to join NASL side Portland Timbers.

Paul's son, Lee Hendrie was born in Birmingham in May 1977 and in September 1977 Paul Hendrie joined Bristol Rovers. In two seasons with Rovers he scored one goal in the 30 league appearances that he made.

In July 1979 Paul Hendrie joined Halifax Town for a fee of £5,000. In January 1980, he notably scored the goal that put top-flight team Manchester City out of the FA Cup in the third round. Hendrie made nearly 200 league appearances for Halifax.

Hendrie joined Stockport County in August 1984 for a fee of £1,500. Again he made over 100 league appearances and he ended his league career with Stockport in the 1988–89 season.

He subsequently played non-league football for Nuneaton Borough, Bath City, Burton Albion and Chelmsley Town.

== Managerial career ==
=== Redditch United ===
Hendrie joined Redditch United in November 1991, staying just over three years with limited success.

=== Tamworth ===
In February 1995 he left to manage Tamworth and in his first season he guided the club from near relegation to within a point of promotion. However, the next season the Southern League Midland Division title, and with it promotion, was achieved after a 5–0 win at Stafford Rangers, with the overall margin of victory at the end of the season, a massive 26 points.

The next season in the Southern League Premier Division, 1997–1998, Tamworth finished 15th enough. The following season Tamworth finished mid-table after a 9th-place finish, but also reached the first round of the FA Cup, losing 4–1 in a replay at Exeter City after a 2–2 draw at the Lamb.

The next season Tamworth finished 6th and yet again reach the first round of the FA Cup, before an extra time winner by Bury saw them triumph 2–1 after yet again another 2–2 draw at the Lamb.

In December 2000 Hendrie was sacked due to the club being stuck in the relegation zone, and at the start of the new year Gary Mills was appointed manager.

In a poll run by Tamworth F.C. in 2020, Hendrie was voted the club's greatest ever manager.

== Honours ==
- Tamworth (manager) – Southern League Midland Division, 1996–97
