= Dan Parkinson (footballer) =

English footballer

Personal information
- Full name: Daniel James Parkinson
- Date of birth: 2 November 1992 (age 34)
- Place of birth: Preston, England
- Height: 5 ft 11 in (1.80 m)
- Position: Midfielder

Team information
- Current team: Barrow

Youth career
- ?–2011: Morecambe

Senior career*
| Years | Team | Apps | (Gls) |
| 2011–2013 | Morecambe | 6 | (0) |
| 2011–2012 | → Colwyn Bay (loan) | 3 | (0) |
| 2012 | → Vauxhall Motors (loan) | 13 | (2) |
| 2012 | → Vauxhall Motors (loan) | 10 | (4) |
| 2013– | Barrow | 14 | (1) |
- * Club domestic league appearances and goals as of 15:10, 8 May 2014 (UTC)

Daniel James Parkinson is an English footballer who plays as a midfielder. He played in the Football League for Morecambe.

== Playing career ==
Parkinson came through the Morecambe youth academy to sign a one-year contract for the 2011–12 season. He made his first team debut as an 89th-minute substitute for Kevin Ellison in a 2–0 win over Aldershot Town at the Globe Arena on 20 August 2011. Three days later he was again a late replacement for Ellison in a 2–0 defeat to Millwall in a League Cup Second Round clash at The Den.

On 15 December 2011, he joined Colwyn Bay on a month-long loan.

Parkinson was released by Morecambe at the end of the 2012–13 season. He subsequently signed for Barrow of the Conference North.
