= The Steam Room =

- Created by: Richard Alexander
- Country of origin: United Kingdom
- No. of episodes: 22

Original release
- Release: 29 September 2004 – 15 January 2007

The Steam Room is a United Kingdom reality television show hosted by Jo Guest and Michelle Marsh. The first season, hosted by Jo Guest was broadcast in autumn 2004 and the second was co-hosted by Michelle Marsh with Richard Alexander (September 2006 to January 2007). Both seasons were broadcast on the Men and Motors cable/satellite channel in the United Kingdom, operated by ITV.
