= Niall Cowperthwaite =

English footballer (born 1992)

Personal information
- Full name: Niall Thomas Cowperthwaite
- Date of birth: 28 January 1992 (age 34)
- Place of birth: Barrow-in-Furness, England
- Height: 1.80 m (5 ft 11 in)
- Positions: Left back; midfielder

Team information
- Current team: Kendal Town

Youth career
- Morecambe

Senior career*
Years	Team	Apps	(Gls)
2010–2012	Morecambe	10	(1)
2012–2013	Workington	36	(0)
2013	Kendal Town		
2013	Penrith		
2013–2016	Barrow	71	(5)
2018–2019	Workington		
2019–2024	Lancaster City		
2024–	Kendal Town		
- * Club domestic league appearances and goals as of 13:05, 21 April 2025 (UTC)

Niall Thomas Cowperthwaite (born 28 January 1992) is an English professional footballer who plays for Kendal Town as a left back and midfielder.

== Career ==
Born in Barrow-in-Furness, Cowperthwaite moved from the Morecambe juniors to the senior team in August 2010. In May 2012, Cowperthwaite was released by the club. He spent the 2012–13 season with Workington. In June 2013 he left Workington to attend Lancaster University. Later that month he signed for Kendal Town. He also played for Penrith.

In December 2013, he signed for Barrow on non-contract terms. In February 2016 he ruptured his ACL. In July 2018, after two years without a club, he returned to Workington.

On 21 May 2019, he joined Lancaster City. In June 2024 he signed for Kendal Town.

== Personal life ==
He is the son of former Barrow striker Colin Cowperthwaite.

== Career statistics ==
Appearances and goals by club, season and competition
Club	Season	League		FA Cup		League Cup		Other		Total	
Club	Season	Apps	Goals	Apps	Goals	Apps	Goals	Apps	Goals	Apps	Goals
Morecambe	2010–11	7	1	0	0	0	0	0	0	7	1
Morecambe	2011–12	3	0	0	0	0	0	0	0	3	0
Morecambe	Total	10	1	0	0	0	0	0	0	10	1
Workington	2012–13	36	0	1	0	0	0	0	0	37	0
Barrow	2013–14	14	3	0	0	0	0	0	0	14	3
Barrow	2014–15	33	1	0	0	0	0	0	0	33	1
Barrow	2015–16	24	1	1	0	0	0	1	0	26	1
Barrow	Total	71	5	1	0	0	0	1	0	73	5
Career total		117	6	2	0	0	0	1	0	120	6
