= Michelle Marsh =

English model (born 1982)

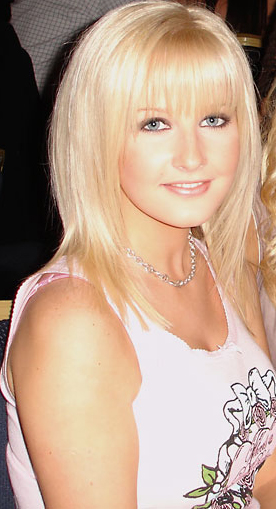
- Marsh in 2005
- Born: 30 September 1982 (age 44); Royton, Oldham, England
- Occupation: Glamour model
- Spouse: Will Haining (m. 2007)
- Modelling information
- Height: 5 ft 5 in (1.65 m)
- Hair colour: Blonde
- Eye colour: Blue

Michelle Marsh (born 30 September 1982) is an English former glamour model, known for her appearances on Page 3 of several tabloids and in numerous British lads' mags.

== Career ==
Michelle Marsh was born on 30 September 1982 in Royton, England. Before becoming a model, Marsh worked as a care assistant at a nursing home in Royton.

In 2001, at the age of 18, Marsh was runner-up in The Sun tabloid newspaper's "National Cleavage Week" contest. The following year, she won the "Search for a Babe" contest run by the Daily Star tabloid, and began appearing topless as a "Star Babe" in that newspaper. In 2003, she began appearing as a Page 3 girl in The Sun. Her bubbly-blonde looks and natural 32FF breasts prompted The Sun to hail her as "the new Samantha Fox."

Marsh went on to make numerous glamour modelling appearances in men's magazines such as Loaded, Perfect 10, Nuts, Maxim, Zoo and Playboy. She was regularly partnered with model Lucy Pinder for magazine, television, and corporate appearances.

On 6 November 2006, Marsh released a pop music single titled "I Don't Do." The song spent two weeks in the UK Singles Chart, peaking at No. 89.

Marsh has been featured on a number of British television programmes, including The X Factor: Battle of the Stars, The Weakest Link, Celebrity Big Brother, and Celebrity Four Weddings. She presented a series of The Steam Room and has starred in two reality television series, Trust Me – I'm a Beauty Therapist and CelebAir. She has played minor roles in the television series Hotel Babylon and Life and the 2008 British drama film Clubbed.

While pregnant with her second child in 2010, Marsh announced her retirement from glamour modelling via her official website. She planned to focus on raising her children and developing her singing career.

== Personal life ==
Marsh married now-retired Scottish footballer Will Haining on 2 June 2007 at Auchen Castle Hotel in Moffat, Scotland. They have three children.

== See also ==
- List of glamour models
- Lad culture
