= Auchen Castle =

- Near Moffat, Dumfries and Galloway, Scotland; UK grid reference NT063035
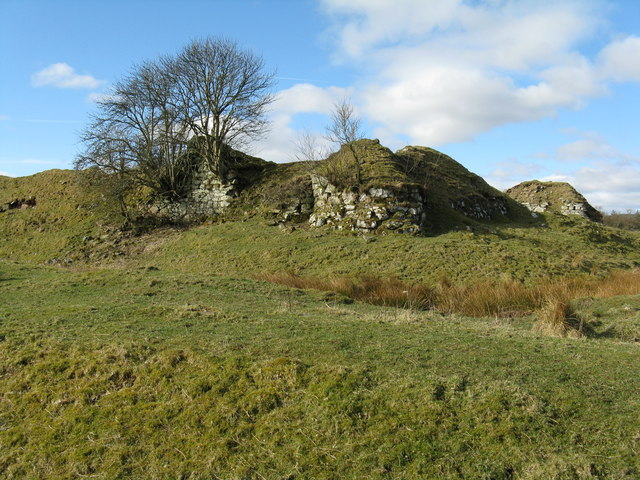
- The remains of the castle in 2008

Site information
- Type: Courtyard Castle
- Owner: Private
- Controlled by: Roger de Kirkpatrick (1306)
- Open to the public: Yes
- Condition: Ruined

Location
- Coordinates: 55.31706°N 3.475865°W

Site history
- Built: Late 13th Century; rebuilt 14th Century; converted in 15th/16th Century
- Materials: Stone

Scheduled monument
- Official name: Auchen Castle
- Type: Secular: castle; ice house; kiln; moat
- Designated: 18 March 1937
- Reference no.: SM683

Auchen Castle is a ruined 13th-century quadrangular castle situated near Moffat, Dumfries and Galloway. It was designated as a scheduled monument in 1937.

== History ==
The castle was probably built by the Kirkpatrick family in the early to mid-13th century, possibly to replace the nearby motte-and-bailey castle at Garpol Water and command the valley of the River Annan to the east and the ravine formed by Garpol Burn to the south. The first documentary evidence of the estate is from a charter from December 1306, in which Sir Roger de Kirkpatrick loans money to Sir Humphrey de Bohun, 4th Earl of Hereford. After Kirkpatrick's death during the siege of Lochmaben Castle in 1313, the lands appear to have been transferred to Thomas Randolph, 1st Earl of Moray, although it is unclear what happened to them after his death in 1332. By the 15th century, the castle was owned by the Douglasses of Morton, before later passing to the Johnstones of Corehead, possibly during King James II's campaign against the Douglasses.

In its earliest form, the castle comprised a four-sided enclosure with the entrance on the north wall. It had a round bastion at the north west angle and a garderobe in the east curtain wall. The walls were protected by a broad ditch, except in the north where a causeway passed over a linked pair of fish ponds. The entrance was later reinforced by a dog-leg forework in the form of a pend. In the late 15th or early to mid-16th century, the castle was adapted for use as an artillery fortification with the walls lowered and reinforced with masonry and earth.

An inventory made of goods belonging to the deceased James Douglas of "Auchencassill" in October 1483, includes a folding table, a horse, a chalice and altar ornaments, a sword, a featherbed, bed curtains and canopy, and the hangings or apparelling of the hall, a cushion, a silver salt and spoon, kitchen ware, an eel crook, and other items. This selection was claimed by William Douglas of Drumlanrig as his heir.
