= Matty Poole =

English footballer

Personal information
- Full name: Matthew Poole
- Date of birth: 22 October 1990 (age 36)
- Place of birth: Lancaster, England
- Position: Midfielder

Team information
- Current team: Kendal Town

Senior career*
| Years | Team | Apps | (Gls) |
| 2009–2010 | Morecambe | 0 | (0) |
| 2010–3013 | Lancaster City | | |
| 2013–2015 | Kendal Town | | |
| 2015–2016 | Lancaster City | | |
| 2016– | Kendal Town | | |
- * Club domestic league appearances and goals as of 19:12, 2 May 2017 (UTC)

Matthew Poole (born 22 October 1990) is an English professional footballer who plays as a midfielder for Kendal Town.

== Career ==
Born in Lancaster, Poole made his professional debut for Morecambe on 11 August 2009 in a Football League Cup match against Preston North End. Poole was released by Morecambe at the end of the 2009–10 season, and he later signed for non-league Lancaster City, making his debut for them in August 2010. He also spent time with Kendal Town.
