= HMS Brazen =

There have been a number of Royal Navy ships called HMS Brazen

- HMS Brazen (1781) was a cutter purchased in 1781 and sold on 9 April 1799 for £340.
- HMS Brazen (1798) was the French privateer L'Invincible General Bonaparte, taken in 1798; Brazen was wrecked in January 1800 near Newhaven.
- HMS Brazen (1808) was a sixth-rate 28-gun sloop, launched in 1808 and broken up in 1848.
- HMS Brazen (1856) was an Albacore-class gunboat
- HMS Brazen (1896) was the lead ship of the Brazen-class destroyers, a C-class destroyer built at the end of the 19th century.
- HMS Brazen (H80) was a B-class destroyer, built in 1930 and sunk by an air attack in 1940.
- HMS Brazen (F91) was a Type 22 frigate sold to the Brazilian Navy in 1994, which renamed her Bosisio. She was expended as a target in 2017.

== Battle Honours ==
- Norway 1940
- English Channel 1940
- Kuwait 1991
