= UK Uncovered =

British reality television series

- Created by: Richard Alexander
- Country of origin: United Kingdom
- No. of episodes: 70

Original release
- Release: 17 December 2002 – 20 February 2007

UK Uncovered is a British reality television show that was filmed on location as part of a national tour, visiting nearly every major town and city in the United Kingdom. Three series aired originally on the Men and Motors cable/satellite channel in the United Kingdom, operated by ITV plc, starting in December 2002. The first two series were fairly similar to each other, being that they allowed a previously unseen side of British character in a purely observational style, however the third series showed something of a departure by intertwining deliberate comedy and fictional characters interacting with the public.

The series was unashamedly aimed at exploiting the sexual preoccupations of young British clubbers, with copious nudity, bawdy situations and innuendo being contrived by the production crew. Despite taking what could be described as a somewhat sordid and juvenile glee at depicting flashes of (mostly female) nudity, the programme at least did not pretend that it was aiming to provide anything more profound or informative.

The presenters Richard Alexander and his sometime sidekick Syd took a self-deprecating approach that was steeped in Northern values: sardonic, cheeky, endearing and ever ready to play the fool. A harder edged "laddish" approach would have likely made the series one-dimensional and more overtly sexist.

Two compilation episodes, called UKU Uncut were made and broadcast in early 2005, which contained very graphic language and adult humour - these have never been shown again, possibly due to the re-branding of the channel by ITV.

== See also ==
- UK Uncovered : Full On, third season of the show.
