= Combined operation =

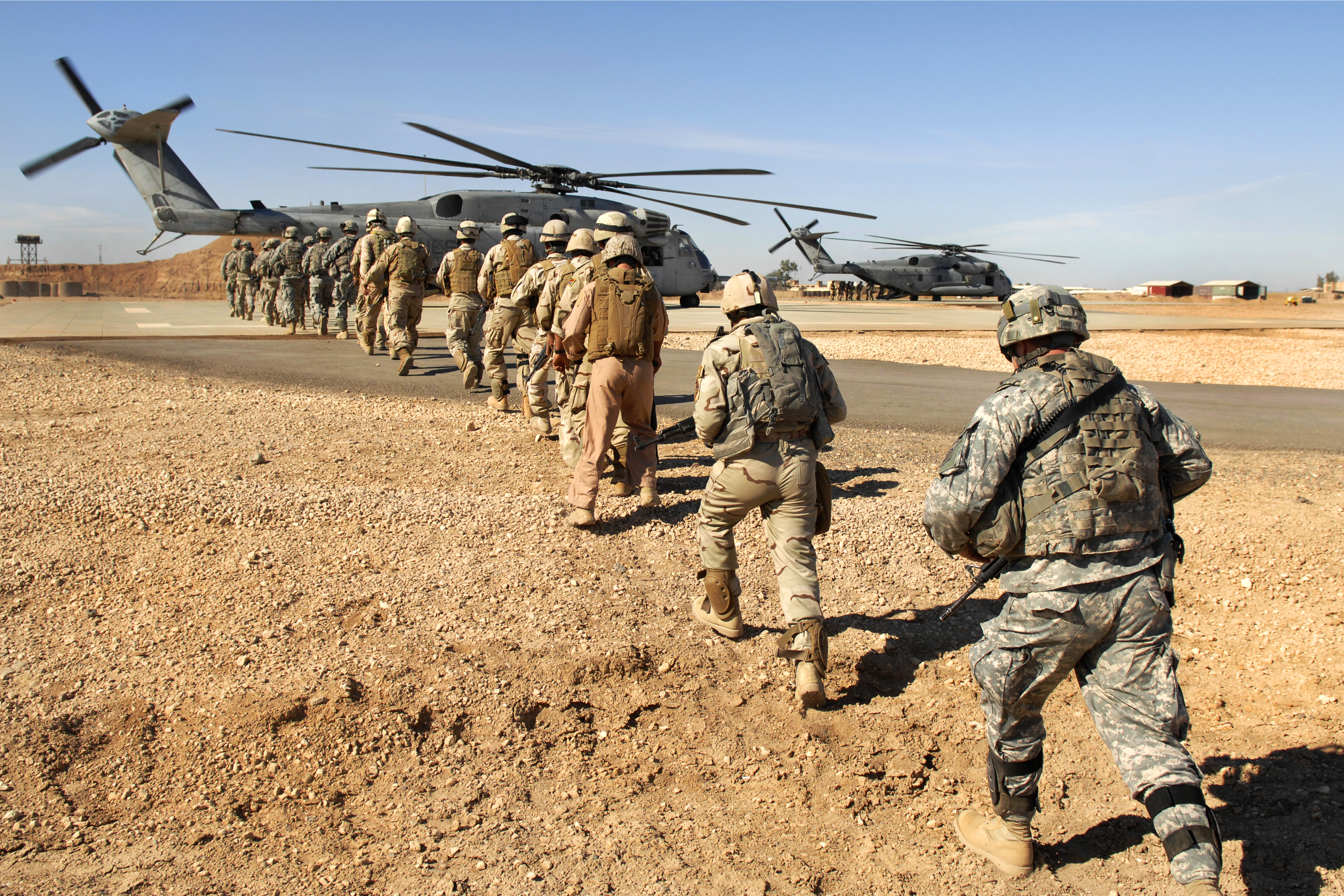
U.S. Army and Iraqi Army soldiers boarding helicopters during the Iraq War, 2009

In current military use, combined operation is an operation conducted by forces of two or more allied nations acting together for the accomplishment of a common strategy, a strategic and operational and sometimes tactical cooperation. Interaction between units and formations of the land, naval and air forces, or the cooperation between military and civilian authorities in peacekeeping or disaster relief operations is known as joint operations or interoperability capability.

== Pre-modern history ==
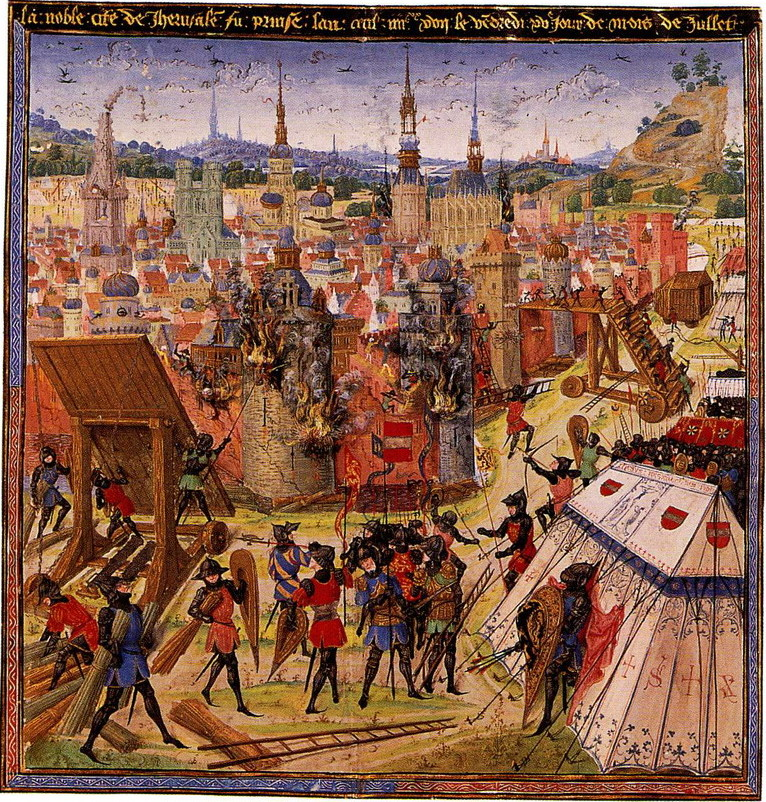
The Siege of Jerusalem during the First Crusade, 1099. The Crusades could be considered an early form of combined operations.

The concept of combined operations evolved largely as a result of expeditionary warfare, which can be traced to the Sea Peoples. In its basic form it involved raiding coastal regions by land forces arriving from the naval vessels. The raiding tactics were expanded into more complex operations by Alexander the Great, who used naval vessels for both troop transporting and logistics in his campaigns. The next exponents of combined operations in the ancient world of the Mediterranean Basin were the Carthaginians, who introduced two entirely-new dimensions to the use of naval forces by not only staging operations that combined naval and land troops but also eventuated in combining strategic multi-national forces during the land phase of the operation when Hannibal in his most famous achievement at the outbreak of the Second Punic War marched an army that included war elephants, from Iberia over the Pyrenees and the Alps into northern Italy. Following the example of Carthage, the Romans used combined operations extensively to expand their empire and influence in the Mediterranean and beyond, including the Roman conquest of Britain, which was not a temporary expeditionary operation but included long-term occupation and Roman settlement of the territories. After the peace agreement between Kush and the Roman Empire in 21 BC, the Kushites and the Romans performed joint military operations against several adversaries.

The next development of combined operations came from environmental pressures in the Scandinavian region during the Middle Ages and the emergence of the Viking migrations, which combined raiding, longer term inland operations, occupation and settlement. They were conducted as sea, coastal, and riverine operations, and sometimes were strategic in nature, reaching as far as Constantinople.

In Southeast Asia, the development of combined operations proceeded along the same developmental path as in Europe with the raids by the Wokou, or so-called "Japanese pirates." Because the Wokou were weakly resisted by the Ming Dynasty, the raiding eventually developed into fully-fledged expeditionary warfare with the Japanese invasions of Korea (1592–1598).

The development in combined operations reached a new level during the Crusades, when the element of political alliance was introduced as an influence on the military strategy, such as during the Sixth Crusade.

Although all combined operations until the invention of the combustion engine were largely dependent on the sailing vessels, it was with the creation of sophisticated rigging systems of the European Renaissance that the Age of Sail allowed a significant expansion in the scale of combined operations, notably by the European colonial empires. Some have argued that was the first revolution in military affairs, which changed national strategies, operational methods and tactics both at sea and on land. One notable example of that evolution was the French invasion of Egypt (1798).

== Modern history ==
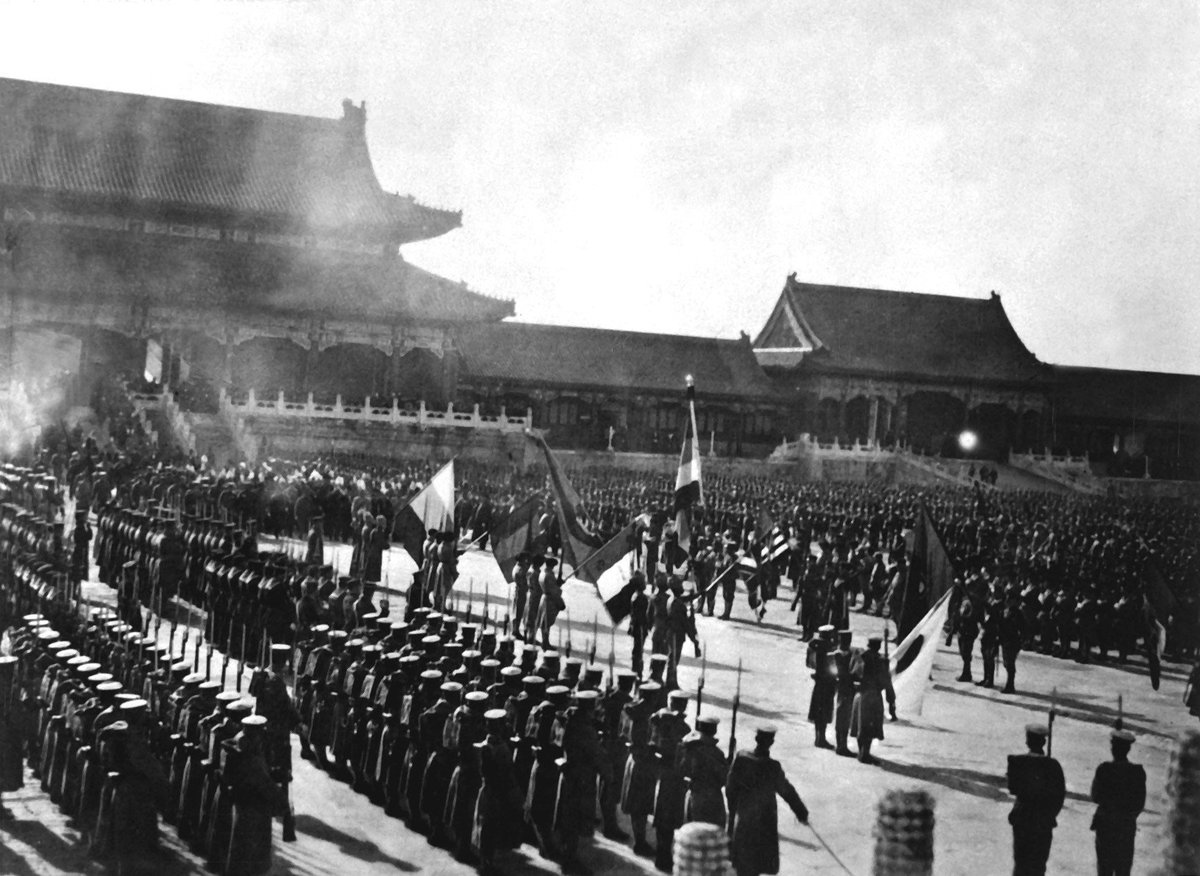
Armies of the Eight-Nation Alliance in Beijing, China, during the Boxer Rebellion

Though a significantly-expanded combined operation, the Crimean War was the first example of a planned combined operations campaign that was directed as part of a multinational coalition strategy. Aside from being the first modern expeditionary operation that used steam powered warships and telegraph communications, which made it the departing point for the rest of the 19th- and 20th-century developments, it was also the first used as a military theatre instrument to force decision in the conflict.

The next development in the evolution of combined operations was made during the expansion of the European empires and the era of colonialism, which also led to the inclusion of the combined operations methods into the direct expression of national strategies to avoid full-scale conflicts in the shape of the gunboat diplomacy approach. It was then that naval troops, which had been used almost exclusively for defence of vessels or minor beach operations, were expanded to enable extended littoral operations. The colonial experience, though largely confined to the period before World War I, persisted well into the 20th century.

The period of World War I was prolonged well past its completion into the 1920s and saw combined operations established as a systematic and planned operations with a larger scope than the simple transportations of troops and the beginnings of development in true combined operations at strategic, operational, and tactical levels with the unsuccessful amphibious landing at Gallipoli. That operation combined the elements of overall war planning context, multinational deployment of forces as part of the same operation, and the use of troops prepared for the landings (as opposed to disembarkation), as well as naval gunfire support that was only limited during the era of sailing ships. It also included extensive use of combat engineering in support of the infantry.

One of the most extensive and complex of combined operations that followed the war was the Allied intervention in the Russian Civil War, which saw forces deployed in the Baltic region, the Arctic region, along the Black Sea coast and in the Russian Far East. It for the first time saw the use of aircraft used in cooperation with the naval and land components of the deployed forces.

The phrase "combined operations" was first introduced by the British War Office during World War II to denote multi-service activities, those that involved air, land or naval forces acting together and coordinated by the Combined Operations Headquarters.

Given the U.S. usage of the word "joint" meaning such activities, the British usage faded relatively quickly. After World War II, the U.S. Department of Defense began using the term to denote multinational operations, which might mean the land forces of several countries, for example Combined Forces Land Component Command, or Combined Joint multinational multiservice activities and operations.

The term Combined Joint Task Force then took on an extra meaning, beyond that of a multinational multiservice grouping since it came to refer to a particular type of NATO deployment planning, outside the treaty area, in the late 1990s.

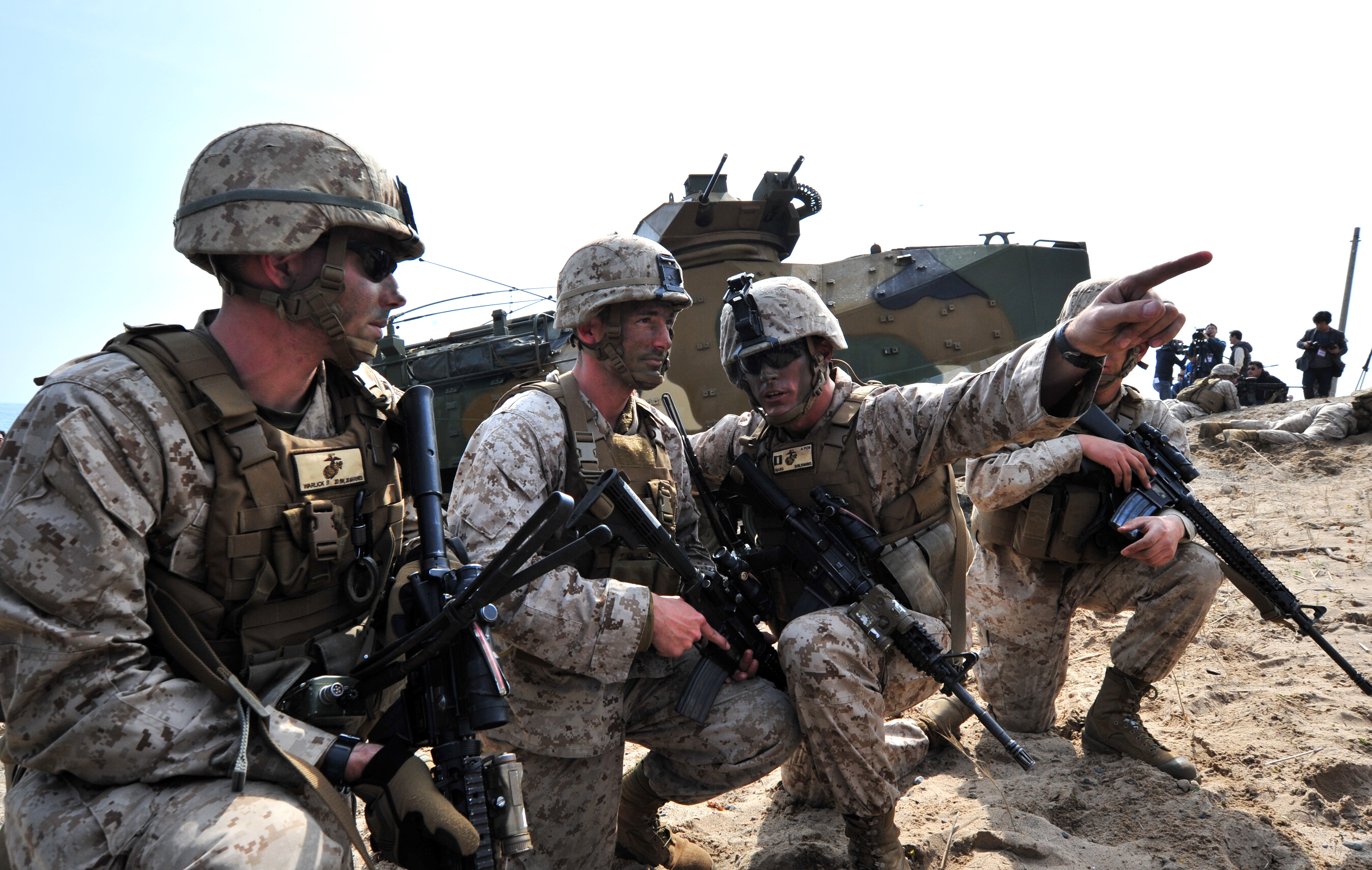
Republic of Korea Marines and U.S. Marines during an amphibious warfare exercise in 2014

Since the early 1980s, the concept of combined operations had been referred to by NATO, particularly by the US. Department of Defence, as joint operations. Regardless of the use of combined, joined or interoperability terms, the concept ensures that different military organisations maintain the ability to conduct combat and non-combat military operations regardless of the national and service (ground, naval and air forces) differences.

The ability to conduct combined operations allows national forces, their subordinated formations, units or systems to perform tasks and complete missions and operations together. The overriding requirement is that they share common doctrine and procedures, utilise each other's infrastructure and bases, and to be able to communicate with one another. These abilities reduce duplication of effort and increase economies of scale in a strategic alliance of its members, allow pooling of resources and produce synergies among its commands.

In the NATO concept, interoperability does not necessarily require common military equipment. What is important is that this equipment can share common facilities and communicate with other equipment. NATO militaries claim to have achieved interoperability because of decades of joint planning, training and exercises during the Cold War.

== See also ==
- Joint warfare

== Sources ==
- Combined Operations Command dedication site Combined Operations in WW2 Home Page
- Williams, Darryl A. Maj., Facilitating Joint Operations: The Evolving Battlefield Coordination Element., School of Advanced Military Studies Monographs, Command and General Staff College (CGSC), Fort Leavenworth, KS : US Army Command and General Staff College, 1996

== External sources ==
- Joint Operations (RN, Army, RAF, NATO) Joint Operations (RN, Army, RAF, NATO) : The RN Today : Training and People : Royal Navy
- NATO Joint Warfare Centre, Stavanger, Norway
