= Stuart Hendrie =

English footballer (born 1989)

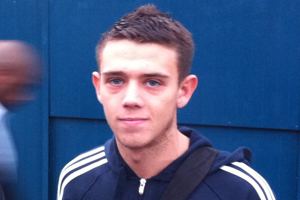
- Hendrie pictured in 2011

Personal information
- Full name: Stuart Scott Hendrie
- Date of birth: 1 November 1989 (age 37)
- Place of birth: Solihull, England
- Height: 1.75 m (5 ft 9 in)
- Position: Striker

Team information
- Current team: Walsall Wood

Youth career
- 2001–200?: Aston Villa
- Tamworth
- 200?–2008: Walsall

Senior career*
| Years | Team | Apps | (Gls) |
| 2008 | Studley | | |
| 2008 | Coleshill Town | | |
| 2008 | Stratford Town | 5 | (0) |
| 2008–2009 | Coleshill Town | | |
| 2009 | Alvechurch | | |
| 2009–2010 | Atherstone Town | 33 | (9) |
| 2010–2011 | Morecambe | 7 | (0) |
| 2011 | → Tamworth (loan) | 4 | (0) |
| 2011 | Hinckley United | 8 | (0) |
| 2011–2012 | → Daventry Town (loan) | | |
| 2012 | → Redditch United (loan) | | |
| 2012 | Stourbridge | | |
| 2012–2013 | Redditch United | | |
| 2013 | Tamworth | 7 | (0) |
| 2013 | → Stratford Town (loan) | 4 | (1) |
| 2013 | → Corby Town (loan) | 16 | (5) |
| 2014 | → Barwell (loan) | 3 | (0) |
| 2014–2016 | Basford United | | |
| 2016–2017 | Montpellier | 40 | (54) |
| 2017–2018 | Rugby Town | 22 | (6) |
| 2018 | GNP Sports | 9 | (12) |
| 2018–2019 | Coleshill Town | 19 | (3) |
| 2019–2020 | Highgate United | 24 | (11) |
| 2020–2021 | Boldmere St. Michaels | 6 | (1) |
| 2021 | Coton Green | 13 | (6) |
| 2021 | Coventry United | 4 | (2) |
| 2022 | Heather St John's | 1 | (0) |
| 2022–2023 | Walsall Wood | 15 | (3) |
| 2023–2024 | Coton Green | 1 | (0) |
| 2024– | Nuneaton Town | 0 | (0) |
- * Club domestic league appearances and goals as of 20:49, 1 July 2022 (UTC)

Stuart Scott Hendrie (born 1 November 1989) is an English professional footballer who plays for side Nuneaton Town, as a striker.

He previously played for a number of non-League clubs in the Midlands area, and made seven appearances in the Football League for Morecambe. As a youngster, he played in midfield, later developing into a striker.

== Playing career ==
=== Early career ===
Hendrie joined Aston Villa's academy at the age of eleven, moving on to Tamworth before joining the youth team at Walsall. According to his brother Lee, he was thin as a youngster and was released because he was considered not strong enough. He finished the 2007–08 season with Studley, playing in the Midland Alliance.

After a trial with Tamworth during the 2008 close season, Hendrie spent short spells with Coleshill Town and Stratford Town, where he made eight appearances (five in the league) without scoring. Hendrie then returned to Coleshill in October. He joined Alvechurch, his third Midland Alliance team of the season, in April 2009.

Hendrie moved up to the Southern League Midlands Division with Atherstone Town for the 2009–10 season. He was played in a defensive role during the early part of the season, but manager Dale Belford moved him to attack where he flourished. Belford suggested he had the ability to play at Football League level.

=== Morecambe ===
After a two-week trial, Hendrie signed a one-year contract with Football League Two club Morecambe on 4 August 2010, on a free transfer. He made his professional debut on 31 August, as a second-half substitute in a Football League Trophy defeat to Macclesfield Town, and his first appearance in the Football League was on 13 November, in a 2–1 home defeat against Lincoln City, after coming on as an 87th-minute substitute for Paul Mullin.

In March 2011, Hendrie moved on an emergency one-month loan to Tamworth. His time at Tamworth was disrupted by illness, and after returning to Morecambe he made no more first-team appearances and was released at the end of his contract.

=== Return to non-League ===
Hendrie signed for Conference North side Hinckley United in July 2011, He soon joined Mark Kinsella's Daventry Town on a short-term loan deal, where he teamed up with his brother Lee. He made a goalscoring debut in a 4–3 FA Trophy win over Kidsgrove Athletic, and scored in the game, but made no appearances in the Southern League. Hendrie ended the 2011–12 season on loan at Redditch United, again playing alongside his brother. He was released by Hinckley having played eight matches in the Conference North without scoring.

In August 2012, he joined Stourbridge, but returned to Redditch in October.

On 18 January 2013, Hendrie was confirmed as a Tamworth player, teaming up with his brother Lee.

Hendrie joined Basford United in March 2014, and went on to score four goals in his first two games with the club.

Hendrie joined Montpellier in 2016. He was the top scorer in Midland League Division Three during his first season with the club.

Hendrie signed for Rugby Town in December 2017.

Hendrie spent the first part of the 2018–19 season playing for GNP Sports, his performances lead to him making a return to Coleshill Town for the 2018–19 season.

Hendrie signed for Highgate United on 18 July 2019.

Hendrie signed for Boldmere St. Michaels for the 2020–21 season, making 6 league appearances before the season was curtailed.

Hendrie signed for Midland League Division Two side Coton Green for the 2021–22 season. He subsequently played for Coventry United, Heather St John's, and Walsall Wood.

After playing of Coton Green, in July 2024 Hendrie joined the newly reformed Nuneaton Town.

== Personal life ==
Hendrie was born in Solihull, and is the son of Scottish former professional footballer Paul Hendrie, who had moved to England in 1972 to join Birmingham City. He attended Colebourne Primary School in Hodge Hill, Birmingham. He is the younger brother of England international Lee Hendrie and cousin of another Scottish former footballer, John Hendrie.
