= Will Haining =

Scottish footballer (born 1982)

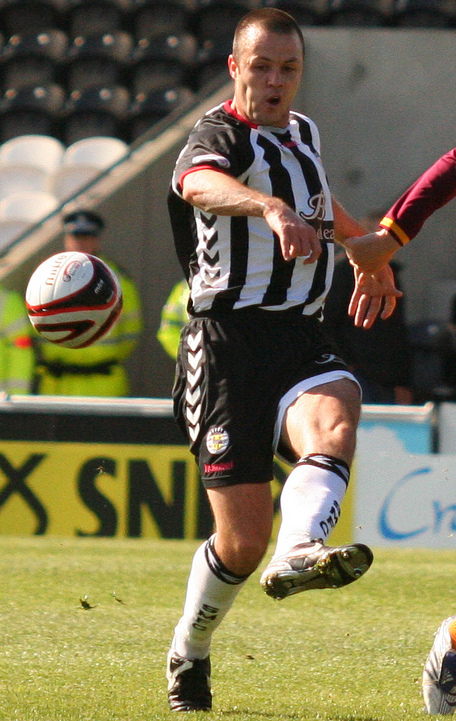
- Haining playing for St Mirren in 2009

Personal information
- Full name: William Wallace Haining
- Date of birth: 2 October 1982 (age 44)
- Place of birth: Glasgow, Scotland
- Height: 6 ft 0 in (1.83 m)
- Position: Defender

Youth career
- 1998–2001: Oldham Athletic

Senior career*
Years	Team	Apps	(Gls)
2001–2007	Oldham Athletic	155	(11)
2007–2009	St Mirren	48	(1)
2009–2013	Morecambe	121	(3)
2011	→ Fleetwood Town (loan)	7	(0)
2013–2014	Hyde	27	(0)
2014–2015	Macclesfield Town	12	(0)
2015–2016	Ashton United	2	(1)
Total		372	(16)

Managerial career
- 2016–2017: Ashton United (player-manager)
- * Club domestic league appearances and goals

William Wallace Haining (born 2 October 1982) is a Scottish retired footballer.

He started his career in the youth team at Oldham Athletic, breaking into the first team in 2001. After six years with Oldham's first team he signed for St Mirren in the Scottish Premier League where he spent two years, returning to England in 2009 to sign for Morecambe. Whilst at Morecambe he had a loan spell at Fleetwood Town. Following his release from the League Two side, where he was club captain, he signed for Hyde.

== Career ==
=== Oldham Athletic ===
Born in Glasgow, Scotland, Haining started his career in England at Oldham Athletic. He made his first-team debut as an 88th-minute substitute on 26 December 2001 in a 2–0 win over Blackpool at Bloomfield Road. After two further brief substitute appearances in wins over Northampton Town and Stoke City, he made his full debut on 20 April 2002 in a 1–0 win over Queens Park Rangers at Boundary Park. The following season he became a regular in the side, scoring his first goal on 7 December 2002 as the Latics lost at home to Cheltenham Town in the second round of the FA Cup. His first league goal came 19 days later on 26 December in a 1–1 home draw with Blackpool.

His final appearance for the club was against Blackpool in the second leg of the 2006–07 League One play-off semi-final which "the Latics" lost 3–1. He made a total of 180 appearances in six years with the Latics, scoring 12 goals.

=== St Mirren ===
On 28 June 2007 Haining joined Scottish Premier League club St Mirren on a free transfer. He made his debut on 4 August in a 1–0 defeat to Motherwell at Love Street. His first, and ultimately only, goal was a 90th-minute winner on 3 May 2008 in a 1–0 home win over Kilmarnock. He made a total of 35 appearances in the 2007–08 season as "the Buddies" finished in 10th place in the Scottish Premier League.

In December 2008. Haining tore a muscle in his foot and had to wear a medical support boot for four weeks. He was out of action for three months, returning on 28 February 2009 in a 7–0 defeat to Celtic at Celtic Park.

He made a total of 23 appearances in the 2008–09 season as St Mirren finished in 11th place, avoiding relegation to the First Division on goal difference. His contract was not renewed at the end of the season and he left the Buddies when his contract expired on 30 June 2009. He made a total of 58 appearances for "the Buddies", scoring one goal.

In July 2009 he joined English Championship side Blackpool on trial.

=== Morecambe ===
Haining joined Morecambe on a two-year deal on 7 August 2009. His debut was in the 2–2 draw with Hereford United the following day. He has also had a seven-game loan spell at Fleetwood in the Conference. On 5 August he was made captain by new boss Jim Bentley. He was released in the summer of 2013 due to budget constraints.

=== Hyde ===
On 1 August 2013, he signed for Conference Premier side Hyde on a one-year deal. He made his debut for the club on 10 August 2013, in Hyde's opening day 8–0 defeat to Forest Green Rovers.

=== Ashton United ===
Haining joined Ashton United in June 2015. In September 2016, Haining was appointed joint-manager alongside Jody Banim. In April 2017 it was reported, that Haining had resigned from the position and decided to take a break from football.

== Personal life ==
Haining became engaged to English glamour model Michelle Marsh on Valentine's Day 2005. The couple married on 2 June 2007 at Auchen Castle Hotel in Scotland. They have three children.
