= Laurence Wilson =

English footballer

Personal information
- Full name: Laurence Thomas Wilson
- Date of birth: 10 October 1986 (age 40)
- Place of birth: Huyton, England
- Height: 5 ft 10 in (1.78 m)
- Positions: Defender; midfielder

Youth career
- 2003–2004: Everton

Senior career*
Years	Team	Apps	(Gls)
2004–2006	Everton	0	(0)
2006	→ Mansfield Town (loan)	15	(1)
2006–2009	Chester City	115	(4)
2009–2012	Morecambe	111	(11)
2012	Rotherham United	5	(0)
2013–2014	Accrington Stanley	34	(0)
2014–2016	Morecambe	41	(1)
2016–2018	Bangor City	42	(2)
2018–2019	Connah's Quay Nomads	16	(1)
Total		379	(20)

International career
2004	England U18	1	(0)
2005	England U19	1	(0)
- * Club domestic league appearances and goals

Laurence Thomas Wilson (born 10 October 1986) is an English retired footballer who last played for Connah's Quay Nomads. He was on the books at Everton as a teenager, and was capped by England at all youth levels up to and including under-19.

== Playing career ==
=== Everton ===
Wilson is a graduate of the Everton F.C. Academy. He usually plays on the right wing, but can also play left-back. In November 2004, Wilson signed an 18-month professional contract with Everton. In the summer of 2005, he signed a contract extension with the club. He never played for the first-team, but he did make it to the bench, and was an unused substitute in the Champions League qualifier against Villarreal.

==== Mansfield Town ====
In January 2006, Wilson joined Mansfield Town on loan until the end of the season. He made his Football League debut in a 2–2 draw at Wycombe Wanderers in February 2006 as a substitute and started the remaining 14 games of Mansfield's season afterwards, scoring in a 2–2 derby draw at Notts County. Following this, Wilson had his loan spell with Mansfield Town extended until the end of the season.

Wilson became a crowd favourite at Field Mill. It was widely believed that he would join Mansfield permanently if he was released by Everton, especially after commenting that "Mansfield is just the type of club I would like to join if things don't work out [at Everton]. I've enjoyed playing here and the fans have been good to me." Wilson was indeed released by Everton at the end of the 2005–06 season, and was offered a two-year contract by Mansfield. However, to the disappointment of the Mansfield fans, it was announced on 11 May 2006 that Wilson had snubbed the Stags and signed for League Two rivals Chester City – one of the clubs closest geographically to Everton.

=== Chester City ===
Wilson made his league debut for Chester City where he set up a header for Drewe Broughton, in a 2–0 opening day of the season, win over Accrington Stanley on 5 August 2006. Then in a 0–0 draw against Notts County on 12 September 2006, he kept the club a clean sheet throughout the match and was named Man of the Match as a result. He started 34 of Chester's 46 league games, scoring in a 4–1 win over Lincoln City on 9 December 2006. He also found the net four times in cup football, which were against Stockport County, Clevedon Town, Chesterfield and Bury. However, he started every match until he was sent–off, in a 3–0 loss against Macclesfield Town on Boxing Day, resulting him serving a one match suspension. Although he missed out two matches, due to injury later in the 2006–08 season he would predominantly play in the left wing back slot for the remainder of the season.

Following the arrival of Bobby Williamson as Chester manager in May 2007, the side switched from a regular 3–5–2 formation to 4–4–2, with Wilson playing in the left-back slot. He remained a first-choice player during 2007–08 and scored a spectacular 30-yard free kick in Chester's 2–1 win at Macclesfield Town on 27 September 2007. After suffering an injury in late–December, Wilson scored on his return on 8 January 2008, in a 3–3 draw against Accrington Stanley. However, he then received a red card for a second bookable offence, in a 4–0 loss against Rochdale on 29 January 2008. Despite this, Wilson returned to the first team and regained his first team place for the rest of the season; eventually making forty–four appearances and scoring two times in all competitions.

At the start of the 2008–09 season, Wilson continued to be in a first team regular. However, he began facing his own injury concern which last between September and November. After returning to the first team, Wilson was suspended twice and another was on 27 January 2009, in a 3–0 loss against Port Vale. After the match, Manager Mark Wright wasn't happy towards Wilson's sending off, stating that it was a disgrace and that he "cost us [Chester] dearly." For this, Wilson served a three match suspension. As a result, he 2008–09 campaign saw Wilson score once in 34 league appearances as the club suffered relegation from League Two.

Following the final match of the season, Wilson was released from his contract at Chester. Wilson later reflected about the club's relegation.

=== Morecambe ===
On 14 July 2009, Wilson signed a two-year deal with League Two side Morecambe after leaving Chester.

Wilson made his Morecambe debut in the opening game of the season, starting the whole game, in a 2–2 draw against Hereford United. Between 22 August 2009 and 5 September 2009, he set up two goals in two separate weeks against Macclesfield Town and Rochdale. Wilson then scored his Morecambe goal on 21 November 2009, in a 1–0 win over Cheltenham Town, followed up by scoring, in a 4–0 win over Darlington three days later. Three weeks later, on 12 December 2009, he scored again, in a 5–0 win over Bournemouth. Since making his debut for the club, Wilson started every match until he was suspended in January for picking five yellow cards this season. Despite suffering setbacks of another suspension and ankle injury, Wilson finished his first season, making forty–six appearances and scoring three times in all competitions.

In the 2010–11 season, Wilson started the first four matches until he received a red card for a second bookable offence, in a 4–0 loss against Oxford United on 6 September 2010. For his performance, he served a three match suspension. After returning to the first team from suspension, Wilson regained his first team place and it wasn't until on 8 January 2011 when he scored his first goal of the season, in a 3–1 win over Shrewsbury Town, followed up by scoring a brace, in a 2–1 win over Torquay United. However, in a 3–0 loss against Wycombe Wanderers on 26 March 2011, Wilson suffered an injury in the first half and was sidelined for several weeks. Although he returned to the first team for the rest of the game, Wilson went on to make forty–one appearances and scoring three times in all competitions. On 6 June 2011, he signed a contract extension with the club, keeping until the end of the 2011–12 season.

In the 2011–12 season, Wilson continued to cement his first team place and started the season well when he scored in a 2–0 win over Northampton Town on 27 August 2011. Two weeks later, on 11 September 2011, Wilson scored, as well as, assisting a goal, in a 6–0 win over Crawley Town. Then, he scored on 22 October 2011, in a 4–0 win over Port Vale, followed up by scoring a brace, in a 3–3 draw against Rotherham United. He also scored in the first round of the FA Cup, in a 2–1 loss against Sheffield Wednesday on 13 November 2011. However, as the 2011–12 season progressed, his season was later overshadowed with injuries. Nevertheless, he finished the season, making thirty–four appearances and scoring six times in all competitions.

His time with them saw him consistently earn a place in the starting line-up, accumulating a total of 111 appearances and scoring 11 goals.

=== Rotherham United ===
At the end of the 2011–12 season Wilson signed for Rotherham United, signing a one–year contract, on 21 June 2012. Upon joining Rotherham United, Wilson said "it took two minutes" to convince him to join the club. Upon joining the club, Wilson was given a number three shirt ahead of the new season.

Wilson made his Rotherham United debut in the first round of League Cup against Hull City, where he started the game before coming off in the 13th minute, as they went on to lose in the penalty–shootout after playing 120 minutes. He then started the whole game in the opening game of the season, in a 3–0 win over Burton Albion. Wilson then started every match since the start of the season as a left–back, until he suffered a knee injury that sidelined for several weeks and even though he recovered, he never played for Rotherham United's first team again. Although he returned from injury, Wilson's contract was terminated by mutual consent on 23 November 2012. On 23 November 2012, WilsonIt was later revealed that Wilson left early over family reason and desire "to move back home to Liverpool." Following his release, Wilson returned to Morecambe, where he played in the club's reserve match.

=== Accrington Stanley ===
In January 2013, he signed for Accrington Stanley until the end of the season.

Wilson made his Accrington Stanley debut two days later on 5 January 2013 after signing for the club, starting the game before being substituted in the 61st minute, in a 2–0 loss against Dagenham & Redbridge. Since making his Accrington Stanley debut, Wilson quickly became a first team regular for the side and he went on to make nineteen appearances for the side at the end of the 2012–13 season. For his performance, Wilson signed a contract extension.

In the 2013–14 season, Wilson continued to be a first team regular at the start of the season until he suffered an injury that kept him out for several months. Although he returned to the first team, in a 1–1 draw against Wycombe Wanderers on 2 November 2013, his return was short–lived when he suffered another injury. Having lost his first team place throughout 2013, he then came on as a second–half substitute, in his first appearances in months, where he set up one of the goals, in a 3–3 draw against Newport County on 11 January 2014. He also set up another goal, in a 3–2 loss against Scunthorpe United on 8 February 2014. However, in a 0–0 draw against Bury on 18 February 2014, he received a straight red card a foul in the first half, resulting him serving a three match ban. Unfortunately, once again, Wilson suffered another injury that kept him out for the rest of the season. Despite this, Lawrence went on to make sixteen appearances in all competitions. At the end of the 2013–14 season, he was released by the club.

=== Morecambe (second spell) ===
On 16 July 2014, Wilson re–joined Morecambe for the second time of his career, signing a one–year contract.

Wilson made his Morecambe debut for the second time of his career, in a 3–0 win over Dagenham & Redbridge in the opening game of the season. After missing one game in the follow-up, due to the club's rotation that left him out of the starting eleven, he returned to the first team on 19 August 2011, in a 1–0 win over Oxford United in the follow-up match. However, Wilson's return was short–lived when he suffered an ankle ligament injury during a 2–1 win over Cambridge United on 23 August 2014. After two months with an injury, he returned to training in mid–October and returned to the first team from injury, in a 2–0 loss against Exeter City on 26 October 2014. He then scored his first goal for the club on 7 March 2015, in a 3–2 win over Luton Town. Despite suffering an injury during the 2014–15 season, Wilson went on to make thirty–six appearances and scoring once in all competitions. At the end of the 2014–15 season, Wilson was awarded for the Goal of the Season, which was against Luton Town on 7 March 2015 and earned himself a contract extension after being trigged for another season.

At the start of the 2015–16 season, Wilson continued to retained his left–position until he suffered injuries at the start of September. His injury plagued suffer much further that sidelined him for two months. It wasn't until on 21 November 2015 when he made his first team return, in a 0–0 draw against Barnet. Although he had a hand of first team for the next two months between November and January, Wilson soon lost his first team place to Luke Conlan for the rest of the season, as well as, his own injury concern. Despite this, Wilson went on to make twenty–two appearances in all competitions.

At the end of the 2015–16 season, Wilson was released by the club on 6 May 2016, with one game left to go.

=== Bangor City ===
Wilson joined Welsh Premier League side Bangor City on 9 August 2016.

Three days after signing for the club, Wilson made his Bangor City debut in the opening game of the season, in a 2–1 win over Cefn Druids. However, he suffered a knee injury that kept him out for seven weeks. It wasn't until October when he returned to training from injury. It wasn't until on 9 April 2017 when he scored his first Bangor City goal, in a 3–2 win over Cardiff Metropolitan University. Despite suffering another injury later in the season, Wilson helped the side qualify for the UEFA Europa League next season. At the end of the 2016–17 season, making seventeen appearances and scoring once, Wilson signed a one–year contract extension with the club.

=== Connah's Quay Nomads ===
In May 2018, he signed for Connah's Quay Nomads. He made his competitive debut in a 3-1 Europa League defeat to Shakhtyor Soligorsk.

He made a total of 22 competitive appearances and scored one goal before leaving the club in January 2019 and retired from football.

== International career ==
Wilson was a runner up in the 2005 European Under-19 Championship when England U19 lost against France.

Wilson previously appeared for England U18 in March 2004.

== Career statistics ==
As of match played 25 October 2016

Appearances and goals by club, season and competition
Club	Season	League			National Cup		League Cup		Other^{[A]}		Total	
Club	Season	Division	Apps	Goals	Apps	Goals	Apps	Goals	Apps	Goals	Apps	Goals
Everton	2005–06	Premier League	0	0	0	0	0	0	0	0	0	0
Total			0	0	0	0	0	0	0	0	0	0
Chester City	2006–07	League Two	41	1	5	2	1	0	2	2	49	5
Chester City	2007–08	League Two	40	2	1	0	1	0	2	0	44	2
Chester City	2008–09	League Two	34	1	1	0	1	0	1	0	37	1
Total			115	4	7	2	3	0	5	2	130	8
Morecambe	2009–10	League Two	43	3	2	0	1	0	1	0	47	3
Morecambe	2010–11	League Two	38	3	1	0	2	0	1	0	42	3
Morecambe	2011–12	League Two	30	5	1	1	2	0	1	0	34	6
Total			111	11	4	1	5	0	3	0	123	12
Rotherham United	2012–13	League Two	5	0	0	0	1	0	1	0	7	0
Total			5	0	0	0	1	0	1	0	7	0
Accrington Stanley	2012–13	League Two	19	0	0	0	0	0	0	0	19	0
Accrington Stanley	2013–14	League Two	15	0	0	0	1	0	0	0	16	0
Total			34	0	0	0	1	0	0	0	35	0
Morecambe	2014–15	League Two	26	1	1	0	1	0	0	0	28	1
Total			26	1	1	0	1	0	0	0	28	1
Bangor City	2016–17	Welsh Premier League	3	0	0	0	2	0	0	0	5	0
Career totals			294	16	12	3	13	0	9	2	328	21

A. The "Other" column constitutes appearances (including substitutes) and goals in the Football League Trophy.

== Personal life ==
Despite starting out at Everton, Wilson grew up supporting Liverpool. In February 2011, Wilson became a father when his partner gave birth, which caused him to miss a match, in a 2–0 loss against Lincoln City on 12 February 2011. He later stated that if he regrets missing the match as in retrospect he wasn't a big fan of the expression his newborn gave him on arrival, much to the displeasure of his partner.
