= Halo Aerospace Stadium =

English football stadium in Lancashire

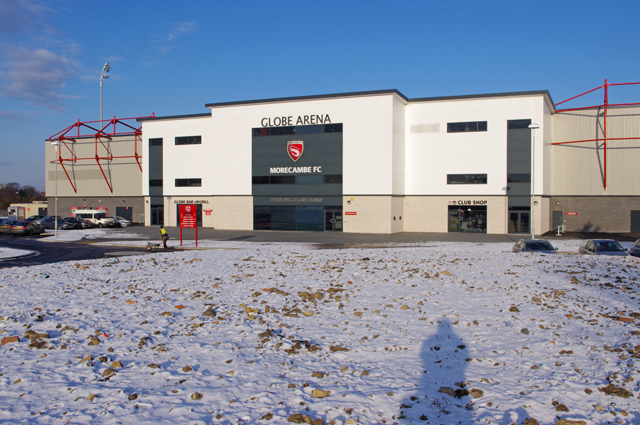
- Wright & Lord Stand

- Location in Morecambe Location in England
- Location: Westgate, Morecambe
- Coordinates: 54.0615°N 2.8672°W
- Elevation: 5 metres (16 ft)
- Capacity: 6,476 (2,173 seated)
- Executive suites: 7
- Type: Stadium
- Surface: Grass
- Scoreboard: Electronic in northeastern corner
- Record attendance: 5,831 (30 April 2022 v Sunderland, League One)
- Field size: 105 x 68 m
- Public transit: Morecambe

Construction
- Groundbreaking: 2009
- Opened: 2010
- Cost: £12 million
- Architect: Croft Goode
- Project manager: Red House Group Ltd
- Main contractor: Globe Construction

Tenant
- Morecambe (2010–present)

The Halo Aerospace Stadium is a football stadium in Morecambe, Lancashire, England, which is the home of Morecambe F.C..

Formerly known, for sponsorship reasons, as the Globe Arena (2010–2021) then the Mazuma Stadium (2021–2026) and between sponsorships called 'The Bay Stadium', the stadium opened in 2010, replacing Christie Park, Morecambe's home from 1921 to 2010.

The stadium holds up to 6,476 supporters, with 2,173 seats available in the Main Stand, which runs the length of one side of the pitch. Opposite the Main Stand is an uncovered terrace with a capacity of 606. At either ends of the pitch are the home and away stands, with the home end holding a maximum of 2,234 supporters and the away end having a capacity of 1,389. In the north east corner of the stadium is the Tyson Fury Foundation, which is split between two floors. The building also houses a gym, which was purchased by Tyson Fury in August 2020.

== History ==
Work officially started on clearing the site of trees on 9 May 2009, and work above ground started in early September 2009. By the middle of September the first main structure of the Main Stand was visible, and in early 2010 the other three stands were being developed. In late May the pitch was seeded.

It was originally planned that the stadium would be ready for the 2009–10 season, but delays meant that it would not be ready until the 2010–11 season.

Globe Arena's opening game was to be a friendly against Bolton Wanderers on 28 July 2010, with the official opening of the stadium due to be marked by a local derby against rivals Preston North End on 31 July. However, all three planned home pre-season friendly fixtures were cancelled because of site delays. The stadium's opening game was instead against Coventry City for Morecambe's League Cup first-round tie on 10 August, in which Morecambe marked the occasion by beating their Championship opponents 2–0, with Andy Fleming scoring the first two goals at the stadium.

The first league game at the Globe Arena was a 0–0 draw with Rotherham United. Their first league win came in a 1–0 match against Shrewsbury Town. The Shrimps' biggest victory on the ground was a 6–0 defeat of Crawley Town, with striker Phil Jevons becoming the first player to score a hat-trick on the ground.

A record of 5,375 was set on 28 August 2013 when Morecambe hosted Newcastle United in the 2nd Round of the League Cup with Newcastle emerging 2–0 winners. That record was broken in a League One match against Sheffield Wednesday eight years later to the day, on 28 August 2021, where 5,481 people attended a 1–0 win for the home side; that was broken the same season, when 5,617 spectators attended a 1–1 draw against Bolton Wanderers, and once more in the last game of the season when 5,831 saw Morecambe fall 0-1 to Sunderland but maintain their place in League One for a second consecutive season.

== Stands ==
=== Wright and Lord Stand ===
The stand is named after chairman Peter McGuigan, to celebrate his 10 years in charge of the club. The stand can also be known as the Main Stand and runs along the side of the pitch. Within the stand, there are facilities on three floors; the ground floor includes advanced changing, first aid, home, away and officials' dressing rooms, gym and office facilities for players and management, as well as a bar, club shop, and reception area on the public side. On the first floor there is a 387m sq hospitality suite for matchday use; it can be sub-divided into three separate areas for smaller functions and private parties, and will be available throughout the year for non-matchday functions including conferencing use for up to 360 people. On the second floor are five private boxes which each accommodate 10 people, a sponsors' lounge for 24 people, and the directors' lounge. All have private catering facilities and their own bird's eye view of the pitch.

=== Halo Terrace ===
The Halo Terrace is also known as the West Stand. It accommodates 2,234 standing home spectators and is located to the left end goal mouth. The stand has a bar and catering outlets to the rear.

=== Dennison Trailers Stand ===
The Dennison Trailers Stand can also be known as the East Stand, and is located to the right end goalmouth. The Stand accommodates 1,389 standing visiting spectators and has a bar and catering outlets.

=== ‘Berlin Wall’ Terrace ===
The Terrace is an uncovered standing area that, like the Peter McGuigan stand, runs along the side of the pitch. It accommodates 606 home spectators and has catering facilities available. At the end of the stand is the Community Block, currently owned by Tyson Fury. It was not open to supporters for the League Cup match against Coventry City because not everything was completed, but it was opened at the next game against Rotherham United. The terrace also houses the ground's scoreboard.

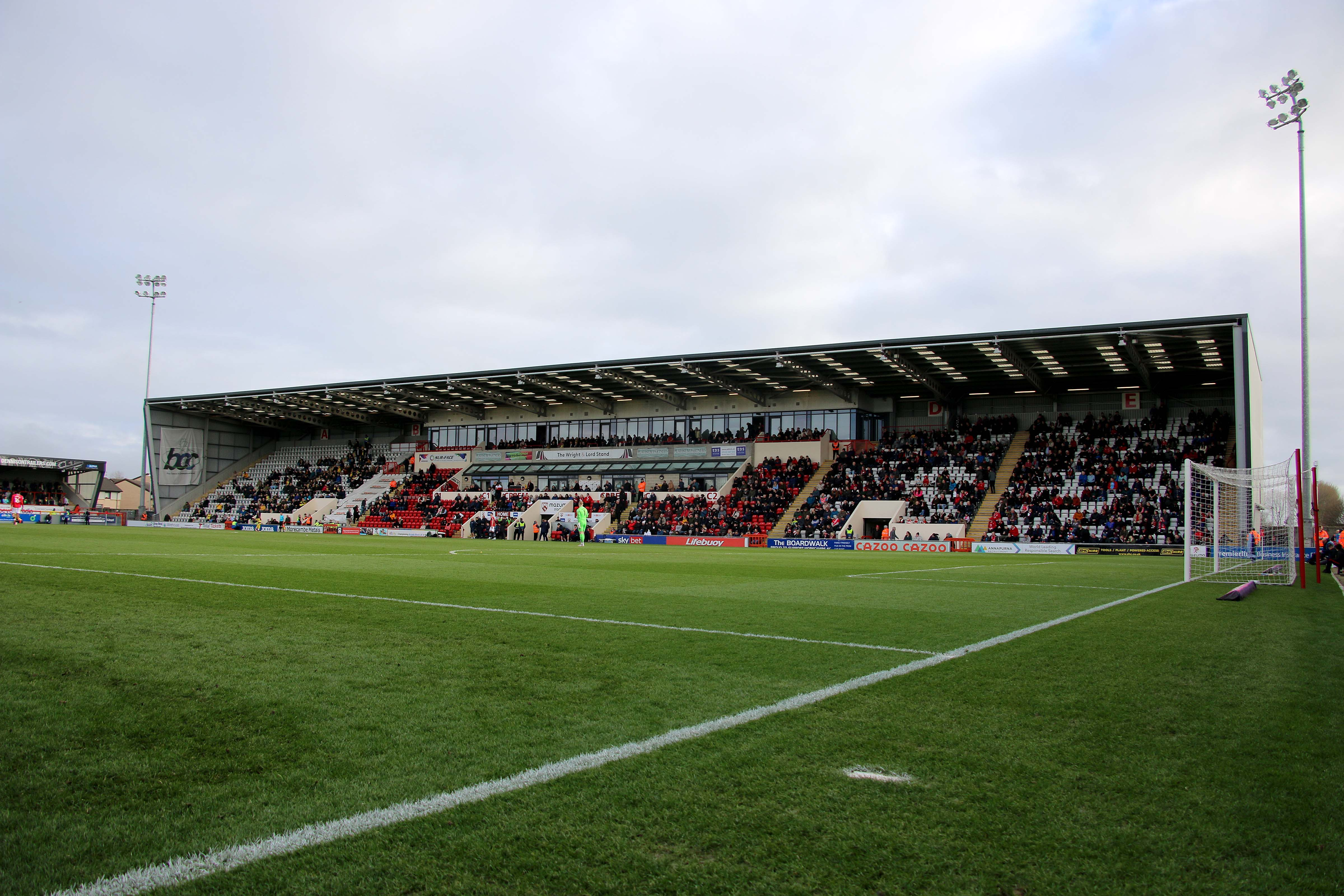
Wright and Lord Stand

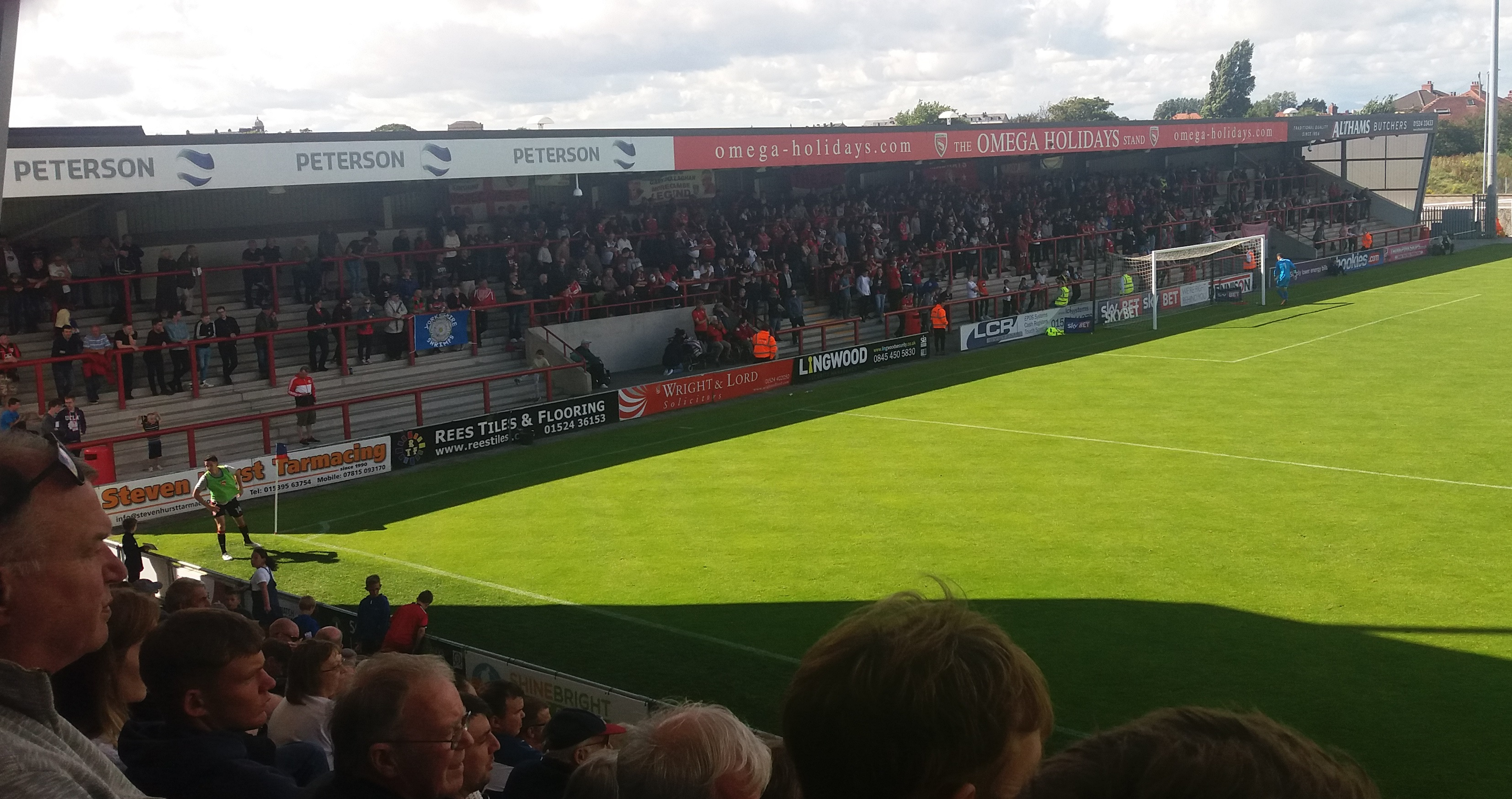
Halo Terrace

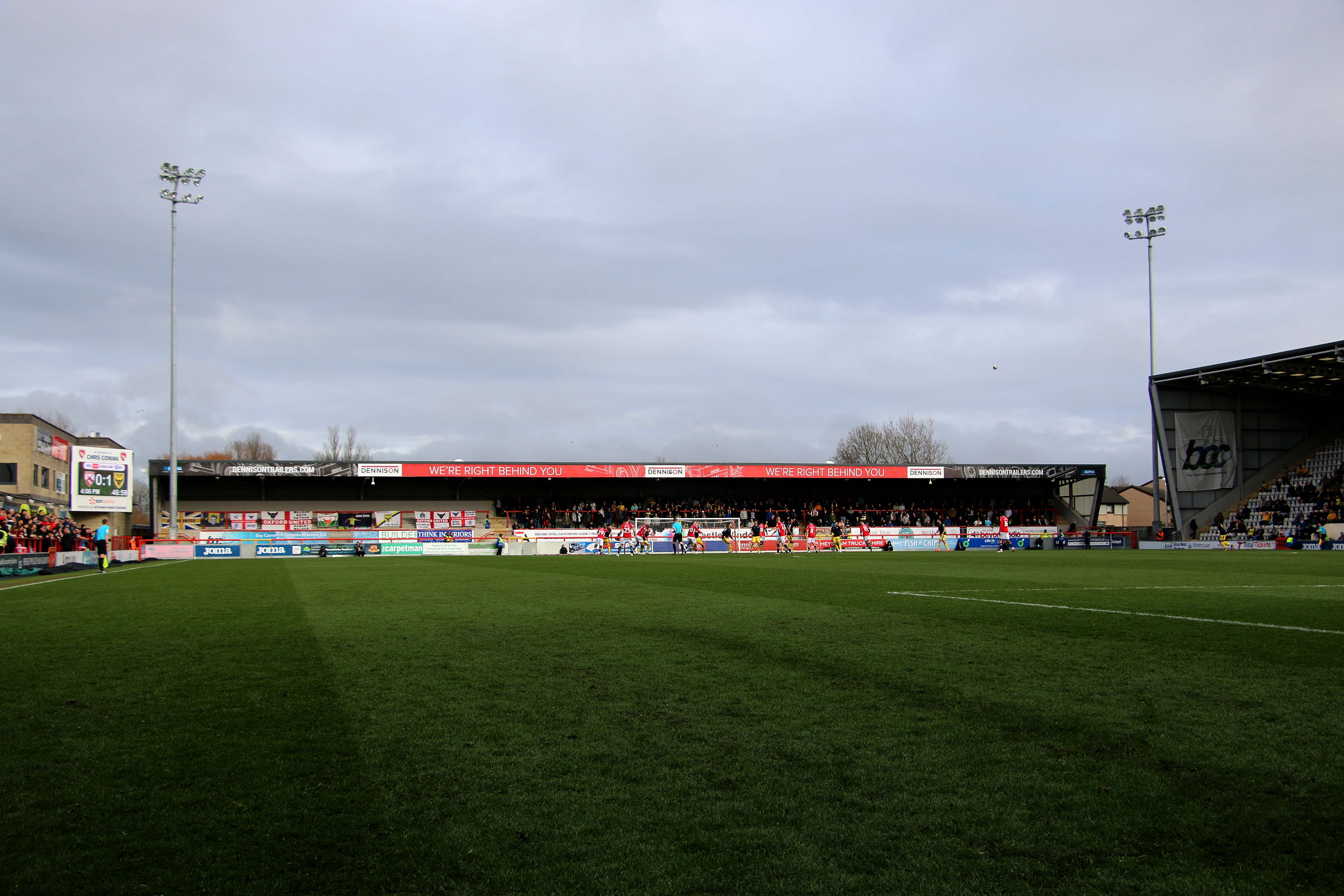
Dennison Trailers Stand

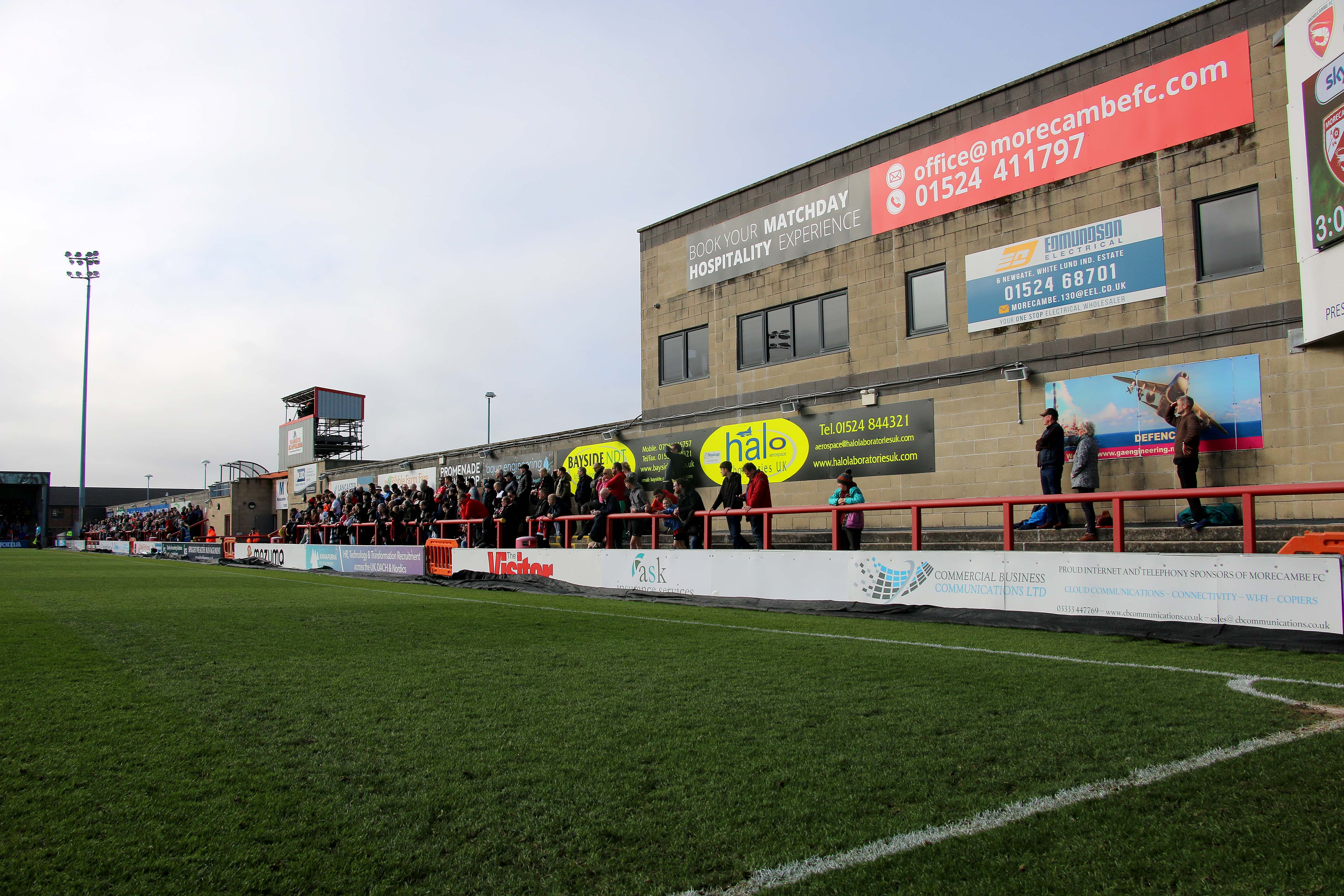
Berlin Wall Terrace
