= 2007–08 Darlington F.C. season =

Darlington
2007–08 season
- Chairman: George Houghton
- Manager: Dave Penney
- Stadium: The Darlington Arena
- League Two: 6th
- FA Cup: First round
- Football League Cup: First round
- Johnstone's Paint Trophy: Northern second round
- Top goalscorer: League: Wright (12); All: Wright (14)
- Highest home attendance: 8,057 (vs Rochdale, 10 May 2008, League Two play-offs)
- Lowest home attendance: 2,628 (vs Shrewsbury Town, 6 November 2007, League Two)
- Average home league attendance: 3,995
- Biggest win: 4–0 (vs. Stockport County, 14 October 2007, League Two); 4-0 (vs. Grimsby Town, 4 December 2007, League Two); 4-0 (vs. Lincoln City, 22 December 2007, League Two)
- Biggest defeat: 1–5 (vs. Hereford United, 3 November 2007, League Two)
Home colours

During the 2007–08 English football season, Darlington F.C. competed in League Two of English football as well as the FA Cup, the League Cup and the League Trophy.

== League table ==
Pos	Team	Pld	W	D	L	GF	GA	GD	Pts	Promotion or relegation
4	Stockport County (O, P)	46	24	10	12	72	54	+18	82	Qualification for League Two playoffs
5	Rochdale	46	23	11	12	77	54	+23	80	Qualification for League Two playoffs
6	Darlington	46	22	12	12	67	40	+27	78	Qualification for League Two playoffs
7	Wycombe Wanderers	46	22	12	12	56	42	+14	78	Qualification for League Two playoffs
8	Chesterfield	46	19	12	15	76	56	+20	69	

Updated to match(es) played on 3 May 2008. Source: The Football League
Rules for classification: 1) points; 2) goal difference; 3) number of goals scored.
(O) Play-off winners; (P) Promoted

== Results ==
=== Football League Two ===
11 August 2007 1	Darlington	2–0	Wrexham	Darlington
15:00 BST	McBride 42', (yellow card) 86'; Wright (yellow card) 47'; Oakes (red card) 63'; Joachim 72'		Valentine (yellow card) 19'; Williams (yellow card) 30'; Pejic (yellow card) 69'	Stadium: The Darlington Arena; Attendance: 4,408; Referee: Karl Evans

18 August 2007 2	Accrington Stanley	0–3	Darlington	Accrington
15:00 BST	Branch (yellow card) 75'		Wright 26', (yellow card) 41'; Ryan (yellow card) 32'; Abbott 49', 49' (pen.)	Stadium: Crown Ground; Attendance: 1,805; Referee: Mark Haywood

25 August 2007 3	Darlington	2–2	Notts County	Darlington
15:00 BST	Wright 40'; Miller 86'		Smith (yellow card) 65'; Butcher 72', 90'	Stadium: The Darlington Arena; Attendance: 3,763; Referee: Peter Walton

1 September 2007 4	Macclesfield Town	0-0	Darlington	Macclesfield
15:00 BST	Dunfield (yellow card) 52'		Wright (yellow card) 60'	Stadium: Moss Rose; Attendance: 2,288; Referee: Andy Woolmer

8 September 2007 5	Rotherham United	0–2	Darlington	Rotherham
13:00 BST	Coughlan (yellow card) 13'		Abbott 10'; Ravenhill (yellow card) 28'; Cummins (yellow card) 52'; Austin (yellow card) 59'; Blundell 76'	Stadium: Millmoor; Attendance: 3,988; Referee: Darren Drysdale

15 September 2007 6	Darlington	2–0	Lincoln City	Darlington
15:00 BST	Abbott 34'; Ravenhill 46'; Ryan (yellow card) 67'		Hand (yellow card) 21'	Stadium: The Darlington Arena; Attendance: 4,075; Referee: Anthony Taylor

22 September 2007 7	Milton Keynes Dons	1-0	Darlington	Milton Keynes
15:00 BST	Knight (yellow card) 61'; Diallo 89'		White (yellow card) 64'; Wright (yellow card) 83'	Stadium: Stadium MK; Attendance: 7,901; Referee: Andy D'Urso

29 September 2007 8	Darlington	1-1	Peterborough United	Darlington
15:00 BST	White (yellow card) 32'; Barrau (yellow card) 62' (yellow-red card) 75'; Wright 63'		Day (yellow card) 12'; Charnock (yellow card) 30'; Mackail-Smith 90'	Stadium: The Darlington Arena; Attendance: 3,974; Referee: Mark Haywood

2 October 2007 9	Darlington	1-1	Rochdale	Darlington
19:30 BST	Wright 59'; Foster (yellow card) 90'		Le Fondre (yellow card) 28'; Prendergast (yellow card) 77', (goal) 88'	Stadium: The Darlington Arena; Attendance: 3,031; Referee: Carl Boyeson

6 October 2007 10	Dagenham & Redbridge	0–3	Darlington	Dagenham
15:00 BST	Moore (yellow card) 68'		Foster 45'; Blundell 67'; Wright 83'; Keltie (yellow card) 88'; Ravenhill (yellow card) 90'	Stadium: Victoria Road; Attendance: 1,888; Referee: Paul Melin

14 October 2007 11	Darlington	4-0	Stockport County	Darlington
14:00 BST	Ryan 21'; Joachim 28'; Wright (yellow card) 65', (goal) 85'; Smith (yellow card) 76'; Blundell 81'		Proudlock (yellow card) 66'	Stadium: The Darlington Arena; Attendance: 3,841; Referee: Andy Haines

20 October 2007 12	Bradford City	0–0	Darlington	Bradford
15:00 BST	Williams (yellow card) 17'; Conolon (yellow card) 68'		Smith (yellow card) 15'; Keltie (yellow card) 30'; Foster (yellow card) 68'; Wainwright (yellow card) 69'; Austin (yellow card) 90'	Stadium: Valley Parade; Attendance: 14,074; Referee: Gavin Ward

27 October 2007 13	Darlington	0-0	Chesterfield	Darlington
15:00 BST	Ravenhill (yellow card) 85'		Picken (yellow card) 72'	Stadium: The Darlington Arena; Attendance: 4,205; Referee: Stuart Attwell

3 November 2007 14	Hereford United	5-1	Darlington	Hereford
15:00 GMT	Rose 4'; Robinson 22'; Smith 47'; Benjamin 58'; Easton 90'		Colbeck 16'; Foster (yellow card) 71'	Stadium: Edgar Street; Attendance: 3,516; Referee: Mick Russell

6 November 2007 15	Darlington	2-0	Shrewsbury Town	Darlington
19:30 GMT	Joachim 27'; Colbeck 63'		Murdock (yellow card) 56'	Stadium: The Darlington Arena; Attendance: 2,628; Referee: Mike Pike

17 November 2007 16	Brentford	0-2	Darlington	Brentford
15:00 GMT	Moore (yellow card) 65'; Dickson (yellow card) 67'; Mackie (yellow card) 78'		Keltie (yellow card) 17', (goal) 17' (pen.); Foran (yellow card) 20'; Wright 37', (yellow card) 40'	Stadium: Griffin Park; Attendance: 4,657; Referee: Mike Thorpe

24 November 2007 17	Darlington	1-0	Wycombe Wanderers	Darlington
15:00 GMT	Abbott 77'; Keltie (yellow card) 90'		Torres (yellow card) 24'	Stadium: The Darlington Arena; Attendance: 3,002; Referee: Scott Mathieson

4 December 2007 18	Grimsby Town	0-4	Darlington	Grimsby
15:00 GMT	Boshell (yellow card) 27'		White 3'; Blundell 25', (yellow card) 53'; Foster (yellow card) 40'; Foran 50'; Ravenhill (yellow card) 76'; Cummins 90'	Stadium: Blundell Park; Attendance: 3,057; Referee: Keith Hill

22 December 2007 19	Lincoln City	0-4	Darlington	Lincoln
15:00 GMT			Foran 11'; Keltie 32' (pen.); Cummins 45', 51', (yellow card) 84'	Stadium: Sincil Bank; Attendance: 4,025; Referee: Graham Horwood

26 December 2007 20	Darlington	1-1	Rotherham United	Darlington
15:15 GMT^{Note 1}	Ridley (yellow card) 50'; Foran (yellow card) 63'; Cummins 68'		Sharps (yellow card) 27'; O'Grady 36'	Stadium: The Darlington Arena; Attendance: 6,965; Referee: Jon Moss

29 December 2007 21	Darlington	0-1	Milton Keynes Dons	Darlington
15:00 GMT	Purdie (yellow card) 2'; White (yellow card) 28'; Miller (yellow card) 83'		Navarro (yellow card) 45'; Johnson 84'; Andrews (yellow card) 86'; Wright (yellow card) 90'; Swailes (yellow card) 90'	Stadium: The Darlington Arena; Attendance: 5,304; Referee: Graham Salisbury

1 January 2008 22	Rochdale	3-1	Darlington	Rochdale
15:00 GMT	Thompson 22'; Rundle (yellow card) 36'; Murray 37'; Le Fondre 45' (pen.); McArdle (yellow card) 90'		White (yellow card) 31' (yellow-red card) 74'; Austin (yellow card) 36'; Keltie 54' (pen.); Ravenhill (yellow card) 55'; Wright (yellow card) 81'	Stadium: Spotland Stadium; Attendance: 3,116; Referee: Rob Lewis

12 January 2008 23	Darlington	3-0	Bury	Darlington
15:00 GMT	Wright 12'; Miller 22'; Mayo 58'; Keltie (yellow card) 65'		Futcher (yellow card) 61'; Challinor (yellow card) 79'	Stadium: The Darlington Arena; Attendance: 3,003; Referee: Anthony Bates

15 January 2008 24	Morecambe	0-3	Darlington	Morecambe
15:00 GMT	Grand (yellow card) 74'		Austin 27'; Wright (yellow card) 60'; Joachim 63'; Cummins (yellow card) 65'; Blundell 70'	Stadium: Christie Park; Attendance: 2,773; Referee: Darren Drysdale

19 January 2008 25	Mansfield Town	0-1	Darlington	Mansfield
15:00 GMT	Buxton (yellow card) 76'		Ravenhill (yellow card) 20'; Blundell 30' (pen.); Foran (yellow card) 45'; Foster (yellow card) 62'	Stadium: Field Mill; Attendance: 3,344; Referee: Michael Jones

26 January 2008 26	Darlington	2-2	Macclesfield Town	Darlington
15:00 GMT	Wright 10', (yellow card) 54'; Cresswell 72' (o.g.); Ravenhill (yellow card) 90'		Gritton 60'; Cresswell 64'; Reid (yellow card) 90'	Stadium: The Darlington Arena; Attendance: 3,585; Referee: Dean Whitestone

29 January 2008 27	Darlington	1-0	Accrington Stanley	Darlington
19:30 GMT	Wright 1'			Stadium: The Darlington Arena; Attendance: 2,808; Referee: Kevin Friend

2 February 2008 28	Wrexham	2-0	Darlington	Wrexham
14:30 GMT	Evans 21'; Proctor 86'		Ravenhill (yellow card) 53'; Cummins (yellow card) 57'	Stadium: Racecourse Ground; Attendance: 4,013; Referee: Steven Cook

9 February 2008 29	Darlington	1-0	Accrington Stanley	Darlington
19:30 GMT	Joachim 11'; White (yellow card) 31'; Blundell (yellow card) 70'			Stadium: The Darlington Arena; Attendance: 3,145; Referee: Kevin Friend

12 February 2008 30	Notts County	0-1	Darlington	Nottingham
15:00 GMT			Ravenhill 45'; Austin (yellow card) 74'	Stadium: Meadow Lane; Attendance: 3,421; Referee: Mick Russell

16 February 2008 31	Darlington	1-2	Mansfield Town	Darlington
15:00 GMT	Wright (yellow card) 19'; Austin 22'; White (red card) 45'; Blundell (yellow card) 49'		Louis 56'; Dawson 64'	Stadium: The Darlington Arena; Attendance: 3,527; Referee: Neil Swarbrick

23 February 2008 32	Bury	1-2	Darlington	Bury
15:00 GMT	Sodje (yellow card) 66', (goal) 88'		Ndumbu-Nsungu 6' (pen.); Ravenhill (yellow card) 19'; Austin (yellow card) 35'; Cummins 67'; Wiseman (yellow card) 89'	Stadium: Gigg Lane; Attendance: 2,554; Referee: Andy Hall

1 March 2008 33	Darlington	3-1	Brentford	Darlington
15:00 GMT	Ndumbu-Nsungu 48'; Joachim 59'; Stockdale (yellow card) 83'; Abbott 90'		Reid 82'	Stadium: The Darlington Arena; Attendance: 3,508; Referee: Dave Foster

4 March 2008 34	Darlington	1-0	Chester City	Darlington
19:30 GMT	Abbott 27'		Linwood (yellow card) 28'; Roberts (yellow card) 66'	Stadium: The Darlington Arena; Attendance: 3,294; Referee: Rob Shoebridge

8 March 2008 35	Wycombe Wanderers	2-0	Darlington	High Wycombe
15:00 GMT	Knight 24'; Bloomfield (yellow card) 71'; McGleish 84'		Ravenhill (yellow card) 42'; Valentine (yellow card) 45'; Ndumbu-Nsungu (yellow card) 90'	Stadium: Adams Park; Attendance: 5,185; Referee: Ray Lee

11 March 2008 36	Shrewsbury Town	0-0	Darlington	Shrewsbury
15:00 GMT			Miller (yellow card) 45'; Kennedy (yellow card) 61'	Stadium: New Meadow; Attendance: 4,499; Referee: Roger East

15 March 2008 37	Darlington	3-2	Grimsby Town	Darlington
15:00 GMT	Wright (yellow card) 21', (goal) 64'; Abbott 33', 44'; Austin (yellow card) 74'		Butler 29', 30'; Clarke (yellow card) 38'; Bolland (yellow card) 63'	Stadium: The Darlington Arena; Attendance: 3,499; Referee: Anthony Taylor

22 March 2008 38	Chester City	2-1	Darlington	Chester
15:00 GMT	Rutherford 6', (yellow card) 75'; Partridge 36'		Stockdale (yellow card) 21'; Foster (yellow card) 43', (goal) 84'	Stadium: Deva Stadium; Attendance: 1,759; Referee: Darren Deadman

24 March 2008 39	Darlington	2-2	Morecambe	Darlington
15:00 GMT	Foran (yellow card) 57'; Kennedy 84'; Ndumbu-Nsungu 89'		Thompson 38' (pen.); Newby 41'	Stadium: The Darlington Arena; Attendance: 3,719; Referee: Michael Oliver

29 March 2008 40	Darlington	1-3	Bradford City	Darlington
15:00 GMT	Keltie 11' (pen.); Nelthorpe (yellow card) 65'; Foran (red card) 83'; Foster (yellow card) 85'		Penford 50'; Conlon 63'; Colbeck 79'; Nix (yellow card) 88'	Stadium: The Darlington Arena; Attendance: 4,492; Referee: Darren Drysdale

1 April 2008 41	Barnet	0-0	Darlington	Chipping Barnet
20:15 BST^{Note 2}			Purdie (yellow card) 60'; White (yellow card) 68'; Parker (yellow card) 90'	Stadium: Underhill Stadium; Attendance: 1,678; Referee: Paul Armstrong

5 April 2008 42	Stockport County	1-0	Darlington	Stockport
15:00 BST	Dickinson 37'; Rose (yellow card) 87'		Austin (yellow card) 50'; Nelthorpe (yellow card) 63'; White (yellow card) 85'; Keltie (yellow card) 90'	Stadium: Edgeley Park; Attendance: 6,460; Referee: Mike Thorpe

12 April 2008 43	Darlington	0-1	Hereford United	Darlington
15:00 BST	Foster (yellow card) 74'; Valentine (yellow card) 89'		Hooper 69'	Stadium: The Darlington Arena; Attendance: 4,331; Referee: Dean Whitestone

19 April 2008 44	Chesterfield	1-1	Darlington	Chesterfield
15:00 BST	Leven (yellow card) 28'; Picken (yellow card) 33'; Niven (yellow card) 39'; Ward 50'		Foster (yellow card) 45'; Wright 68'	Stadium: Saltergate; Attendance: 3,809; Referee: Karl Evans

26 April 2008 45	Darlington	2-3	Dagenham & Redbridge	Darlington
15:00 BST	Ravenhill 20'; Arber 52' (o.g.); Parker (red card) 64'		Sloma 63', (yellow card) 75'; Rainford 66' (pen.); Keltie 74' (o.g.); Benson (yellow card) 75'; Huke (yellow card) 90'	Stadium: The Darlington Arena; Attendance: 3,709; Referee: Darren Deadman

3 May 2008 46	Peterborough United	0-2	Darlington	Peterborough
15:00 BST	Morgan (yellow card) 66'; Hyde (yellow card) 72'; Boyd (yellow card) 73'		Kennedy 3', (yellow card) 45'; Ravenhill (yellow card) 38'; Cummins 52'; Miller (yellow card) 59'; Keltie (yellow card) 73'	Stadium: London Road Stadium; Attendance: 10,400; Referee: Steve Bratt

^Note 1 Kick off delayed by 15 minutes due to crowd congestion
^Note 2 Kick off delayed by 30 minutes due to an issue with floodlights

=== League Two play-offs ===
10 May 2008 1st Leg	Darlington	2–1	Rochdale	Darlington
17:35 BST	Kennedy 28'; Miller 90'	Report; Report	Dagnall 70'; Jones (yellow card) 90'	Stadium: The Darlington Arena; Attendance: 8,057; Referee: Paul Armstrong

17 May 2008 2nd Leg	Rochdale	2–1 (a.e.t.) (3-3 agg.) (5–4 p)	Darlington	Rochdale
12:00 BST	Howe (yellow card) 29'; Dagnall 43'; Perkins 78' (red card) 109'	Report; Report	Keltie 28' (pen.); Wainwright (yellow card) 33'; Ravenhill (yellow card) 49'; White (yellow card) 74'	Stadium: Spotland; Attendance: 9,870; Referee: Richard Beeby
	Penalties
	Dagnall (penalty scored); Kennedy (penalty scored); Le Fondre (penalty scored); Jones (penalty scored); Muirhead (penalty scored)		(penalty scored) Guylain; (penalty scored) Purdie; (penalty scored) Wainwright; (penalty scored) Ravenhill; (penalty missed) Kennedy

=== FA Cup ===
10 November 2007 First round	Darlington	1-1	Northampton Town	Darlington
15:00 GMT	Blundell 8'		Larkin 26'	Stadium: The Darlington Arena; Attendance: 2,964; Referee: Karl Evans

20 November 2007 First round replay	Northampton Town	2-1	Darlington	Northampton
19:45 GMT	Kirk 36'; Johnson 41'		Foster (yellow card) 54'; Wright 90'	Stadium: Sixfields Stadium; Attendance: 2,895; Referee: Paul Melin

=== League Cup ===
14 August 2007 First round	Barnsley	2–1	Darlington	Barnsley
15:00 BST	Reid (yellow card) 45'; Ferenczi 65'; Reid 77'		Wright 70'; Ravenhill (yellow card) 85'	Stadium: Oakwell; Attendance: 3,780; Referee: Rob Shoebridge

=== Football League Trophy ===
9 October 2007 Northern first round	Darlington	0-1	Leeds United	Darlington
19:30 BST	Blundell (yellow card) 9'; Keltie (yellow card) 67'; White (yellow card) 90'		Andrews (yellow card) 31'; Thompson (yellow card) 43'; Huntington 48'	Stadium: The Darlington Arena; Attendance: 7,891; Referee: Mike Jones

== Player details ==
Includes players with at least one appearance in any competition

No.	Pos	Nat	Player	Total		League Two (Including play-offs)		FA Cup		League Cup		League Trophy	
No.	Pos	Nat	Player	Apps	Goals	Apps	Goals	Apps	Goals	Apps	Goals	Apps	Goals
13	GK	(England) ENG	David Stockdale	46	0	43	0	2	0	1	0	0	0
1	GK	(England) ENG	Andy Oakes	7	0	6	0	0	0	0	0	1	0
15	GK	(Poland) POL	Przemysław Kazimierczak	1	0	1	0	0	0	0	0	0	0
5	DF	(England) ENG	Steve Foster	48	2	44	2	2	0	1	0	1	0
4	DF	(England) ENG	Alan White	41	1	37	1	2	0	1	0	1	0
2	DF	(England) ENG	Neil Austin	30	2	29	2	1	0	0	0	0	0
6	DF	(England) ENG	Ian Miller	29	3	29	3	0	0	0	0	0	0
23	DF	(Wales) WAL	Ryan Valentine	17	0	17	0	0	0	0	0	0	0
3	DF	(England) ENG	Tim Ryan	14	1	13	1	0	0	0	0	1	0
18	DF	(England) ENG	Ben Parker	14	0	14	0	0	0	0	0	0	0
17	DF	(Gibraltar) GIB	Scott Wiseman	10	0	9	0	1	0	0	0	0	0
19	DF	(England) ENG	Craig Nelthorpe	8	0	8	0	0	0	0	0	0	0
18	DF	(England) ENG	Paul Mayo	7	1	7	1	0	0	0	0	0	0
31	DF	(England) ENG	Lee Ridley	6	0	6	0	0	0	0	0	0	0
21	DF	(England) ENG	John Brackstone	6	0	3	0	2	0	1	0	0	0
27	DF	(England) ENG	Chris Palmer	5	0	4	0	0	0	1	0	0	0
22	DF	(England) ENG	Kevin Burgess	1	0	0	0	1	0	0	0	0	0
8	MF	(Republic of Ireland) IRL	Michael Cummins	46	6	42	6	2	0	1	0	1	0
11	MF	(England) ENG	Rob Purdie	46	0	42	0	2	0	1	0	1	0
14	MF	(England) ENG	Ricky Ravenhill	40	3	37	3	1	0	1	0	1	0
10	MF	(England) ENG	Clark Keltie	31	5	28	5	2	0	0	0	1	0
7	MF	(England) ENG	Neil Wainwright	17	0	16	0	0	0	0	0	1	0
32	MF	(England) ENG	Jason Kennedy	15	3	15	3	0	0	0	0	0	0
18	MF	(Scotland) SCO	Kevin McBride	7	1	6	1	0	0	1	0	0	0
31	MF	(Scotland) SCO	Bryan Hodge	7	0	7	0	0	0	0	0	0	0
32	MF	(England) ENG	Joe Colbeck	6	2	6	2	0	0	0	0	0	0
29	MF	(France) FRA	Xavier Barrau	3	0	1	0	1	0	0	0	1	0
12	FW	(England) ENG	Julian Joachim	52	6	48	6	2	0	1	0	1	0
20	FW	(England) ENG	Tommy Wright	45	14	41	12	2	1	1	1	1	0
16	FW	(England) ENG	Gregg Blundell	40	7	36	6	2	1	1	0	1	0
9	FW	(Poland) POL	Pawel Abbott	27	9	24	9	2	0	1	0	0	0
30	FW	(Republic of Ireland) IRL	Richie Foran	12	2	12	2	0	0	0	0	0	0
26	FW	(Republic of the Congo) CGO	Guylain Ndumbu-Nsungu	10	3	10	3	0	0	0	0	0	0
29	FW	(Wales) WAL	Kevin Gall	8	0	8	0	0	0	0	0	0	0
30	FW	(England) ENG	Matt Green	5	0	4	0	0	0	0	0	1	0
19	FW	(England) ENG	Martin Smith	4	0	4	0	0	0	0	0	0	0
31	FW	(United States) USA	Johann Smith	3	0	3	0	0	0	0	0	0	0
26	FW	(Scotland) SCO	Ian Harty	2	0	1	0	0	0	1	0	0	0
29	FW	(England) ENG	Curtis Main	1	0	1	0	0	0	0	0	0	0
24	FW	(England) ENG	Shaun Reay	1	0	1	0	0	0	0	0	0	0

== Transfers ==
=== Transfers In ===
Date	Position	Nationality	Name	From	Fee
18 July 2007	FW	(Scotland)	Ian Harty	Airdrieonians	Free transfer
29 August 2007	MF	(France)	Xavier Barrau	Bradford City	Free transfer
11 January 2008	DF	(England)	Ian Miller	Ipswich Town	Free transfer
18 January 2008	DF	(Wales)	Ryan Valentine	Wrexham	Free transfer
29 January 2008	FW	(Republic of the Congo)	Guylain Ndumbu-Nsungu	Bradford City	Free transfer
31 January 2008	GK	(Poland)	Przemysław Kazimierczak	Bolton Wanderers	Free transfer
31 May 2008	MF	(Poland)	Jason Kennedy	Middlesbrough	Free transfer
1 June 2008	FW	(England)	Jason Bradley	Sheffield Wednesday	Free transfer
28 June 2008	DF	(England)	Clayton Fortune	Leyton Orient	Free transfer

=== Transfers Out ===
Date	Position	Nationality	Name	From	Fee
30 July 2007	-	(England)	Nathan Wright	Gretna	Signed
1 August 2007	MF	(England)	Simon Johnson	Hereford United	Free transfer
1 January 2008	MF	(France)	Xavier Barrau	Hamilton Academical	Signed
1 January 2008	MF	(Scotland)	Kevin McBride	Falkirk	Signed
1 January 2008	-	(England)	Wayne Clarke	Released	-
1 January 2008	DF	(England)	Patrick Collins	Released	-
1 January 2008	MF	(England)	Craig Netherthorpe	Released	-
1 January 2008	FW	(Scotland)	Ian Harty	Released	-
19 March 2008	FW	(England)	Martin Smith	Released	-
22 May 2008	FW	(England)	Julian Joachim	Released	-
22 May 2008	FW	(England)	Shaun Reay	Released	-
22 May 2008	DF	(England)	Kevin Burgess	Released	-
22 May 2008	DF	(England)	John Brackstone	Released	-
1 June 2008	FW	(Republic of the Congo)	Guylain Ndumbu-Nsungu	Released	-
4 June 2008	GK	(England)	David Stockdale	Fulham	£600,000
