= 2008–09 Darlington F.C. season =

Darlington
2008–09 season
- Manager: Dave Penney
- Stadium: The Darlington Arena
- League Two: 12th
- FA Cup: First round
- Football League Cup: Second round
- Johnstones Paint Trophy: Northern Semi Final

This page shows the progress of Darlington F.C. in the 2008–09 football season. During the season, Darlington competed in League Two in the English league system.

== League table ==
Pos	Team	Pld	W	D	L	GF	GA	GD	Pts
10	Chesterfield	46	16	15	15	62	57	+5	63
11	Morecambe	46	15	18	13	53	56	−3	63
12	Darlington	46	20	12	14	61	44	+17	62 (Note: Darlington deducted 10 points for entering administration.)
13	Lincoln City	46	14	17	15	53	52	+1	59
14	Rotherham United	46	21	12	13	60	46	+14	58 (Note: Rotherham United deducted 17 points for leaving administration without a Company Voluntary Agreement.)

Source: The Football League
Rules for classification: 1) points; 2) goal difference; 3) number of goals scored.

== Results ==
=== Football League Two ===
9 August 2008 1	Darlington	1–1	Exeter City	Darlington
	Purdie 40' (pen.)		Seaborne 60'	Stadium: The Darlington Arena; Attendance: 3,559

16 August 2008 2	Notts County	0–0	Darlington	Nottingham
				Stadium: Meadow Lane; Attendance: 4,352

23 August 2008 3	Darlington	1–2	Gillingham	Darlington
	Purdie 78' (pen.)		Jackson 21'; Richards 90'	Stadium: The Darlington Arena; Attendance: 2,831

30 August 2008 4	Macclesfield Town	0–6	Darlington	Macclesfield
	Hessey (red card) 64'		Clarke 26', 53', 64' (pen.), 67'; Walker 56' (o.g.); Austin 90'	Stadium: Moss Rose; Attendance: 1,554

6 September 2008 5	Aldershot Town	2–1	Darlington	Aldershot
	Morgan 7'; Soares 27'		Hulbert 45'	Stadium: EBB Stadium; Attendance: 3,460

13 September 2008 6	Darlington	2–1	Port Vale	Darlington
	Burgmeier 38'; Hatch 77'		Rodgers 28'	Stadium: The Darlington Arena; Attendance: 3,040

20 September 2008 7	Darlington	3–0	Accrington Stanley	Darlington
	Clarke 32', 57'; White 76'			Stadium: The Darlington Arena; Attendance: 2,814

27 September 2008 8	Bournemouth	3–1	Darlington	Bournemouth
	Bartley 15'; Austin 37' (o.g.); Pitman 90'		Hatch 35'	Stadium: Fitness First Stadium; Attendance: 4,124

4 October 2008 9	Darlington	1–1	Shrewsbury Town	Darlington
	White 55'		Thornton 71'	Stadium: The Darlington Arena; Attendance: 2,899

11 October 2008 10	Luton Town	1–2	Darlington	Luton
	Gnakpa 31'		Clarke 15'; Blundell 90'	Stadium: Kenilworth Road; Attendance: 5,560

18 October 2008 11	Wycombe Wanderers	1–1	Darlington	High Wycombe
	McGleish 90' (pen.)		Kennedy 58'; Ryan (red card) 77'	Stadium: Adams Park; Attendance: 5,345

21 October 2008 12	Darlington	2–1	Bradford City	Darlington
	Austin 84'; Burgmeier 90'		Daley 85'	Stadium: The Darlington Arena; Attendance: 3,034

25 October 2008 13	Darlington	3–0	Dagenham & Redbridge	Darlington
	Hatch 5', 55'; Kennedy 51'			Stadium: The Darlington Arena; Attendance: 3,070

28 October 2008 14	Rotherham United	0–1	Darlington	Sheffield
			Ravenhill 61'	Stadium: Don Valley Stadium; Attendance: 3,322

1 November 2008 15	Grimsby Town	1–2	Darlington	Grimsby
	Kalala 71'		Clarke 7'; Ravenhill 15'	Stadium: Blundell Park; Attendance: 3,509

15 November 2008 16	Darlington	2–0	Lincoln City	Darlington
	Foster (red card) 14'; Hatch 47'; Foran 90'			Stadium: The Darlington Arena; Attendance: 3,534

22 November 2008 17	Brentford	1–1	Darlington	London
	Osborne 90'		Foran 60'	Stadium: Griffin Park; Attendance: 4,837

25 November 2008 18	Darlington	1–2	Chester City	Darlington
	Purdie 7'		Lowe 37'; Kelly 53'	Stadium: The Darlington Arena; Attendance: 2,416

13 December 2008 19	Morecambe	1–0	Darlington	Morecambe
	Howe 67'			Stadium: Christie Park; Attendance: 1,873

20 December 2008 20	Darlington	2–2	Barnet	Darlington
	Hatch 8', 25'		O'Flynn 19'; Yakubu 76'	Stadium: The Darlington Arena; Attendance: 2,770

26 December 2008 21	Bury	2–2	Darlington	Bury
	Brown 31' (o.g.); Bishop 55' (pen.)		Miller 44'; Foran 72'	Stadium: Gigg Lane; Attendance: 3,454

28 December 2008 22	Darlington	0–0	Chesterfield	Darlington
				Stadium: The Darlington Arena; Attendance: 3,352

3 January 2009 23	Darlington	2–1	Bournemouth	Darlington
	Abbott 83'; Purdie 90' (pen.)		Hollands 29'	Stadium: The Darlington Arena; Attendance: 2,571

17 January 2009 24	Darlington	5–1	Luton Town	Darlington
	Purdie 10' (pen.), 24'; Hatch 26'; Austin 28'; Blundell 85'		Martin 30'	Stadium: The Darlington Arena; Attendance: 3,319

24 January 2009 25	Shrewsbury Town	1–0	Darlington	Shrewsbury
	Walker 5'			Stadium: Prostar Stadium; Attendance: 5,140

27 January 2009 26	Darlington	1–0	Rotherham United	Darlington
	Carlton 22'; Hulbert (red card) 57'			Stadium: The Darlington Arena; Attendance: 2,431

31 January 2009 27	Dagenham & Redbridge	0–1	Darlington	Dagenham
			Abbott 74'	Stadium: Victoria Road; Attendance: 1,832

17 February 2009 28	Bradford City	0–0	Darlington	Bradford
				Stadium: Coral Windows Stadium; Attendance: 12,782

21 February 2009 29	Darlington	1–0	Grimsby Town	Darlington
	Main 87'			Stadium: The Darlington Arena; Attendance: 3,418

24 February 2009 30	Darlington	1–2	Rochdale	Darlington
	Abbott 60'; Ravenhill (red card) 63'		Le Fondre 28'; Rundle 62'	Stadium: The Darlington Arena; Attendance: 2,858

28 February 2009 31	Exeter City	2–0	Darlington	Exeter
	Gill 72' (pen.); McAllister 83'		White (red card) 88'	Stadium: St James Park; Attendance: 4,851

3 March 2009 32	Darlington	1–0	Notts County	Darlington
	Hulbert 5'			Stadium: The Darlington Arena; Attendance: 2,450

7 March 2009 33	Darlington	1–2	Macclesfield Town	Darlington
	Poole 61'		Evans 40', 67' (pen.)	Stadium: The Darlington Arena; Attendance: 2,995

10 March 2009 34	Gillingham	1–0	Darlington	Gillingham
	Jackson 90' (pen.)			Stadium: Priestfield; Attendance: 4,730

14 March 2009 35	Port Vale	3–1	Darlington	Stoke on Trent
	Dodds 45'; Taylor 51'; Richards 78'		Carlton 26'	Stadium: Vale Park; Attendance: 4,860

17 March 2009 36	Lincoln City	0–1	Darlington	Lincoln
			Carlton 7'	Stadium: Sincil Bank; Attendance: 2,835

21 March 2009 37	Darlington	2–0	Aldershot Town	Darlington
	Main 45'; Carlton 72'			Stadium: The Darlington Arena; Attendance: 2,532

24 March 2009 38	Accrington Stanley	1–0	Darlington	Accrington
	Ryan 22'			Stadium: Crown Ground; Attendance: 1,086

28 March 2009 39	Barnet	0–1	Darlington	London
			Abbott 66'	Stadium: Underhill; Attendance: 2,069

4 April 2009 40	Darlington	0–0	Morecambe	Darlington
				Stadium: The Darlington Arena; Attendance: 2,560

7 April 2009 41	Darlington	1–2	Wycombe Wanderers	Darlington
	Kennedy 60'		Akinde 39'; Zebroski 90'	Stadium: The Darlington Arena; Attendance: 2,180

11 April 2009 42	Chesterfield	0–0	Darlington	Chesterfield
				Stadium: Saltergate; Attendance: 3,642

13 April 2009 43	Darlington	2–2	Bury	Darlington
	Kennedy 38'; Abbott 74'		Hurst 8'; Sodje 53'	Stadium: The Darlington Arena; Attendance: 2,927

18 April 2009 44	Rochdale	0–2	Darlington	Rochdale
			Kennedy 4'; McArdle 66' (o.g.)	Stadium: Spotland; Attendance: 3,789

25 April 2009 45	Darlington	1–3	Brentford	Darlington
	White (red card) 2'; Abbott 59'		Bennett 35'; Clarke 43', 54'	Stadium: The Darlington Arena; Attendance: 3,868

2 May 2009 46	Chester City	1–2	Darlington	Chester
	Miller 89' (o.g.)		Abbott 71', 90'	Stadium: Deva Stadium; Attendance: 1,945

=== FA Cup ===
8 November 2008 Round 1	Darlington	0–0	Droylsden	Darlington
				Stadium: The Darlington Arena; Attendance: 2,479

2 December 2008 Round 2	Droylsden	1–0	Darlington	Droylsden
	Tipton 26'			Stadium: Butcher's Arms Ground; Attendance: 1,672

=== League Cup ===
12 August 2008 Round 1	Walsall	1–2	Darlington	Walsall
	Ricketts 11' (red card) 38'		Kennedy 31'; Clarke 67'	Stadium: Banks's Stadium; Attendance: 2,702

26 August 2008 Round 1	Watford	2–1 (a.e.t.)	Darlington	Watford
	Francis 37'; O'Toole 116'		Blundell 90'	Stadium: Vicarage Road; Attendance: 5,236

=== Football League Trophy ===
7 October 2008 Northern Section Round 2	Darlington	1–0	Huddersfield Town	Darlington
	White 45'			Stadium: The Darlington Arena; Attendance: 1,791

4 November 2008 Northern Section Quarter Final	Darlington	1–0	Bury	Darlington
	White 53'			Stadium: The Darlington Arena; Attendance: 1,651

26 August 2008 Northern Section Semi Final	Rotherham United	1–1 (4–2 p)	Darlington	Sheffield
	Harrison 74'		Foster 35'	Stadium: Don Valley Stadium; Attendance: 2,706

== Players ==
=== First-team squad ===
Includes all players who were awarded squad numbers during the season.

Note: Flags indicate national team as defined under FIFA eligibility rules; some limited exceptions apply. Players may hold more than one non-FIFA nationality.

No.	Pos.	Nation	Player
1	GK	(Republic of Ireland) IRL	Andy Oakes
2	DF	(England) ENG	Neil Austin
3	DF	(England) ENG	Clayton Fortune
4	DF	(England) ENG	Alan White
5	DF	(England) ENG	Steve Foster
6	DF	(England) ENG	Ian Miller
7	MF	(England) ENG	Jason Kennedy
8	FW	(England) ENG	Gregg Blundell
9	FW	(Poland) POL	Paweł Abbott
10	FW	(England) ENG	Danny Carlton (on loan from Carlisle United)
11	MF	(England) ENG	Rob Purdie
12	DF	(Wales) WAL	Ryan Valentine
13	GK	(Poland) POL	Przemysław Kazimierczak
14	MF	(Republic of Ireland) IRL	Ricky Ravenhill
15	GK	(England) ENG	Nick Liversedge

No.	Pos.	Nation	Player
16	FW	(England) ENG	David Poole
17	DF	(England) ENG	Adam Griffin
18	MF	(Liechtenstein) LIE	Franz Burgmeier
19	MF	(England) ENG	Corey Barnes
20	MF	(England) ENG	John McReady
21	MF	(England) ENG	Danny Groves
22	GK	(England) ENG	Scott Pocklington
23	MF	(England) ENG	Robin Hulbert
25	FW	(England) ENG	Curtis Main
26	DF	(Northern Ireland) NIR	Jonathan Hewitson
27	MF	(England) ENG	Josh Gray
28	FW	(England) ENG	Michael Smith
29	FW	(England) ENG	Liam Hatch (on loan from Peterborough United)
30	DF	(England) ENG	Tim Ryan
32	MF	(England) ENG	Dan Riley

=== Left club during season ===
Note: Flags indicate national team as defined under FIFA eligibility rules; some limited exceptions apply. Players may hold more than one non-FIFA nationality.

No.	Pos.	Nation	Player
24	FW	(Republic of Ireland) IRL	Billy Clarke (returned to parent club Ipswich Town following loan spell)
33	MF	(Wales) WAL	Michael Flynn (returned to parent club Huddersfield Town following loan spell)
22	GK	(England) ENG	Simon Brown (returned to parent club Brentford following loan spell)
31	FW	(Republic of Ireland) IRL	Richie Foran (returned to parent club Southend United following loan spell)
10	FW	(England) ENG	Adam Proudlock (signed for Grimsby Town in January 2009)
34	FW	(France) FRA	Sébastien Carole

No.	Pos.	Nation	Player
19	DF	(England) ENG	Lewis Hardman
21	FW	(England) ENG	Jason Bradley
20	MF	(England) ENG	Simon Todd
19	DF	(England) ENG	Carl Tremarco (returned to parent club Wrexham following loan spell)
22	GK	(England) ENG	Dean Gerken (returned to parent club Colchester United following loan spell)
