= Craig Nelthorpe =

English footballer (born 1987)

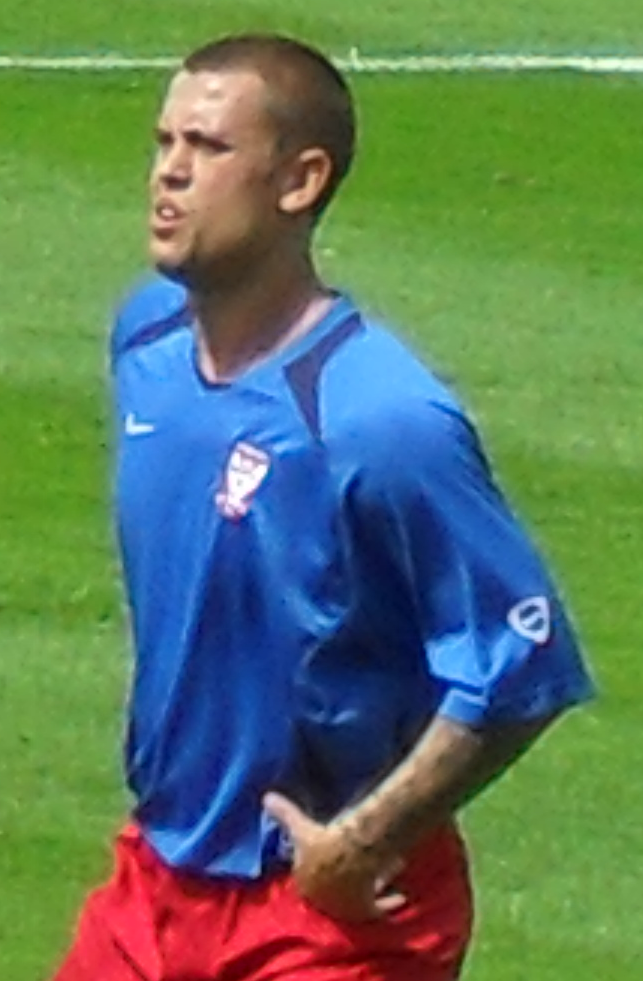
- Nelthorpe training with York City in 2009

Personal information
- Full name: Craig Robert Nelthorpe
- Date of birth: 10 June 1987 (age 39)
- Place of birth: Doncaster, England
- Height: 5 ft 10 in (1.78 m)
- Positions: Left back; left winger

Team information
- Current team: Belper Town

Senior career*
Years	Team	Apps	(Gls)
2003–2004	Brodsworth Miners Welfare		
2004	Frickley Athletic	3	(0)
2004–2009	Doncaster Rovers	10	(1)
2005–2006	→ Hucknall Town (loan)	5	(2)
2006	→ Kidderminster Harriers (loan)	4	(0)
2006–2007	→ Gateshead (loan)	17	(8)
2008	→ Halifax Town (loan)	7	(2)
2008	→ Darlington (loan)	7	(0)
2008	→ Gateshead (loan)	12	(1)
2009	Oxford United	16	(2)
2009–2010	York City	7	(0)
2009–2010	→ Barrow (loan)	6	(2)
2010	→ Luton Town (loan)	8	(0)
2010–2011	Gateshead	34	(5)
2011	Gainsborough Trinity	8	(1)
2011	Winterton Rangers		
2011–2012	Matlock Town		
2012	Eastwood Town	1	(0)
2012	Brigg Town		
2012	Frickley Athletic	1	(0)
2012–2013	Gainsborough Trinity	32	(5)
2013–2015	Harrogate Town	51	(7)
2015	→ Buxton (loan)		
2015	Mornington		
2015–2016	Matlock Town	7	(1)
2016–2017	Scarborough Athletic		
2017–2018	North Ferriby United	3	(0)
2018	Ossett Town	12	(0)
2018–	Belper Town	3	(1)
- * Club domestic league appearances and goals as of 14:51, 23 April 2020 (UTC)

Craig Robert Nelthorpe (born 10 June 1987) is an English semi-professional footballer who plays as a left back or left winger for Northern Premier League Division One Midlands club Belper Town. He has played in the Football League for Doncaster Rovers and Darlington.

Nelthorpe played for Brodsworth Miners Welfare and Frickley Athletic before joining Doncaster Rovers in 2004 and he made his first-team debut in 2005. He was loaned out on six occasions, playing for Hucknall Town, Kidderminster Harriers, Gateshead, Halifax Town and Darlington. He joined Oxford United in 2009 and after being released by them he joined York City. Having left York after a season he rejoined Gateshead.

== Career ==
=== Doncaster Rovers ===
Nelthorpe played for Brodsworth Miners Welfare before joining Northern Premier League Premier Division club Frickley Athletic in April 2004. He made his debut as a 74th minute substitute in a 2–1 defeat at Vauxhall Motors on 3 April 2004. He made three appearances for Frickley before he joined the Doncaster Rovers youth system. He made his first-team debut as a 56th-minute substitute for Steve Foster in a 3–3 draw against Luton Town in League One on 7 May 2005. His first appearance of the 2005–06 season came after being introduced as an 80th-minute substitute for Jonathan Forte against Cambridge United in the Football League Trophy, which Doncaster lost 3–2. He joined Conference North club Hucknall Town on work experience on 23 November 2005 and he made his debut in a 4–0 victory over Redditch United, during which he scored two goals. He made five appearances for Hucknall, with his final appearance coming in a 2–0 defeat to Stafford Rangers, before returning to Doncaster in January 2006. He made one more appearance for Doncaster this season, against Tranmere Rovers on 6 May 2006, which he finished with two appearances for the club.

Nelthorpe signed a professional contract with Doncaster on 28 June 2006 and joined Conference National club Kidderminster Harriers on a one-month loan on 10 October. He made his debut the same day in a 0–0 draw with Oxford United, and he nearly scored for Kidderminster during the first half. He scored his first career goal against Droylsden in the FA Cup, and after Kidderminster decided against extending his loan spell, he returned to Doncaster in November after making six appearances. This was followed by a loan spell at Northern Premier League Premier Division club Gateshead, after joining in November, where he made 19 appearances and scored eight goals. While at Gateshead he still appeared for Doncaster and he had a run of seven appearances, which started after coming on during the 3–2 victory over Crewe Alexandra in the Football League Trophy at the Keepmoat Stadium on 13 February 2007. In the final match of the 2006–07 season on 5 May 2007, Nelthorpe scored his first goal for Doncaster against Northampton Town, which finished as a 2–2 draw. He had a trial with recently relegated League Two club Chesterfield in May 2007, with a view to him joining on loan.

After making four appearances for Doncaster during the 2007–08 season, he joined Conference Premier club Halifax Town on a one-month loan on 10 January 2008. Nelthorpe scored four minutes into his Halifax debut against Northwich Victoria on 26 January 2008, which finished as a 2–2 draw, and he netted three minutes into his next appearance, a 2–2 draw with Rushden on 9 February. He finished the loan spell in March, after making 10 appearances and scoring 3 goals, after which he joined League Two club Darlington on loan until the end of the season on 27 March 2008. He made his debut in a 3–1 defeat at Bradford City on 29 March 2008 and entered the play-off semi-final second leg tie against Rochdale on 17 May 2008 as an 88th-minute substitute for Clark Keltie, which finished as a 5–4 defeat in a penalty shoot-out. He finished the loan spell with eight appearances.

Nelthorpe was handed a new one-year contract at Doncaster in July 2008. He rejoined Gateshead on a three-month loan in August 2008, which he completed in November with 15 appearances and one goal.

=== Oxford United ===
He was released by Doncaster at his own request on 13 January 2009 and joined Conference Premier club Oxford United the next day on a contract until the end of the 2008–09 season. He made his debut in a 1–0 victory over Altrincham on 17 January 2009 and scored his first goal four days later with a shot into the top-left corner of the goal, which gave Oxford a 1–0 victory against Mansfield Town. Nelthorpe was named on standby for the England C team, who represent England at non-League level, in February 2009, for a friendly against Malta under-21s. He was sent off against Torquay United after clashing with Mustapha Carayol, which resulted in a three-match suspension, and following this he said he was looking to use his aggression more effectively. He made his return in a 2–1 victory over Kettering Town on 19 March 2009, during which he opened the scoring with a 20-yard free kick and assisted the second goal with a corner kick that was headed in by Chris Willmott. He finished the season with 16 appearances and 2 goals for Oxford.

=== York City ===
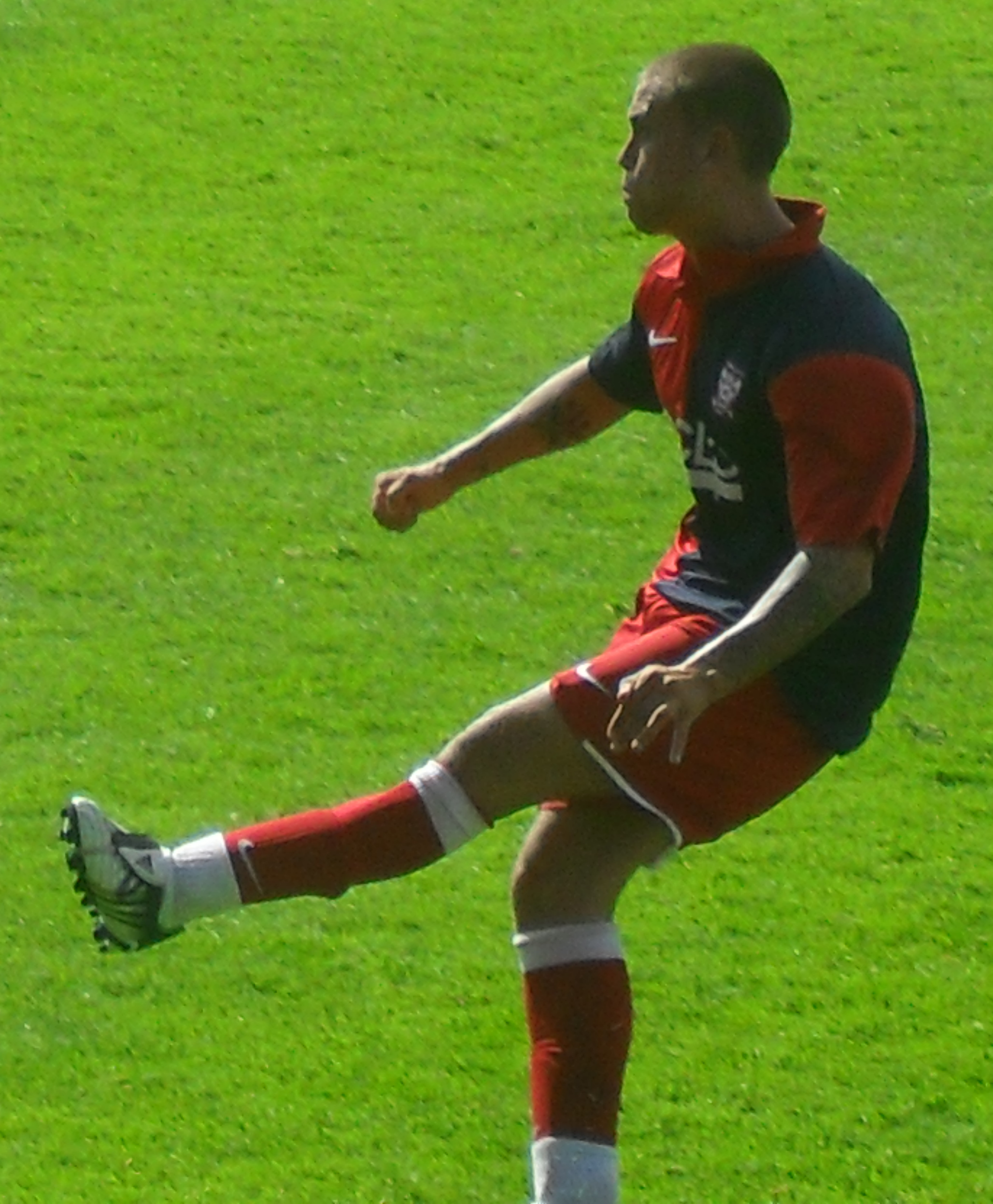
Nelthorpe playing for York City in 2009

Nelthorpe was released by Oxford at the end of the season and he subsequently signed for fellow Conference Premier club York City on 19 May 2009. He suffered from illness during much of York's pre-season, and during a friendly against FC Halifax Town he was sent off for jumping dangerously with his arm raised. He made his debut as a stoppage time substitute in a 2–1 defeat to former club Oxford on 8 August 2009. After failing to start any matches for York, he requested a loan move away from the club in October 2009. On 10 November 2009, he joined league rivals Barrow on loan until 1 January 2010. He made his debut in a 2–2 with AFC Wimbledon on 14 November 2009, assisting Jason Walker's goal through a corner kick. He scored his first goal for Barrow in a 2–2 draw with Grays Athletic on 24 November 2009 with a free kick and finished the loan spell with six appearances and two goals. He joined Conference Premier rivals Luton Town on trial in January 2010, starting a reserve-team match against Peterborough United, before signing on loan until the end of the 2009–10 season on 22 January. He made his debut a day later as an 83rd-minute substitute for Tom Craddock in a 1–0 victory over Gateshead. His loan period at Luton came to an end on 7 May 2010, having made eight appearances for the club. He finished the season with eight appearances for York and was released by the club on 18 May 2010.

=== Gateshead ===
He signed for former club Gateshead, now playing in the Conference Premier, on 21 June 2010. He made his debut in the opening match of the 2010–11 season, a 0–0 draw with Kettering on 14 August 2010. Nelthorpe's first goal came after scoring a 90th-minute winner in a 1–0 victory over Southport, turning in Josh Gillies' cross from six yards. He made 41 appearances for Gateshead during the 2010–11 season, scoring 5 goals, before he was released on 4 May 2011.

=== Later career ===
Nelthorpe signed with Conference North club Gainsborough Trinity on 20 June 2011. However, he was released by the club in November alongside defender Rory Coleman, with manager Steve Housham claiming "they haven't lived up to expectations". Later that month he turned out for Winterton Rangers of the Northern Counties East League Premier Division. He then signed for Matlock Town of the Northern Premier League Premier Division and made his debut on 3 December 2011 in a 2–2 draw away at Bradford Park Avenue, in which he was substituted after half an hour due to a hamstring injury. He then joined Conference North club Eastwood Town in early March 2012 but stayed less than a month, joining Northern Premier League Division One South club Brigg Town. He left soon after, re-signing for Frickley of the Northern Premier League Premier Division, a club he had played for earlier in his career, in late March 2012. His debut came on 24 March 2012 as a 72nd-minute substitute in a 1–0 defeat at home Marine, and was sent off after nine minutes for a needless challenge on Neil Harvey. Shortly after that appearance, he was released by the club on 3 April 2012.

Nelthorpe returned to Gainsborough Trinity in August 2012. In May 2013, Nelthorpe signed with Harrogate Town to become their first signing of the summer. He joined Northern Premier League Premier Division club Buxton on a one-month loan in February 2015, before he emigrated to Australia with his family. Here he joined Mornington, an amateur club in the Victoria State League 1. Nelthorpe returned to England later that year, and re-joined Matlock in October 2015, scoring the winning goal less than a minute into his debut in a 1–0 home victory over Rushall Olympic. He signed for Northern Premier League Division One North club Scarborough Athletic in July 2016. Nelthorpe signed for National League North club North Ferriby United on 30 November 2017. Having made three appearances for North Ferriby, he signed for Northern Premier League Division One North club Ossett Town on 10 January 2018. Nelthorpe signed for Northern Premier League Division One East club Belper Town on 17 August 2018. He had made 19 appearances and scored 1 goal in all competitions by the time the 2019–20 season was abandoned and results expunged because of the COVID-19 pandemic in England.

== Style of play ==
Nelthorpe is left footed and is able to play either as a left back or as a left winger. He has also been played at left wingback, although he has stated his preference in playing a more attacking role, saying "I'm not really the best defensively – I'd sooner go at people". While playing as a winger, he is "adventurous" and has a "willingness to run at defenders". His skills have been praised as being "deft and quick" and his set pieces have been described as being "excellent".

== Personal life ==
Nelthorpe was born in Doncaster, South Yorkshire. He has two children with his girlfriend.

Nelthorpe was arrested along with York players Michael Gash, Michael Ingham and Michael Rankine in August 2009 following an incident involving two other men at a Subway outlet on a night out. The four appeared at York Magistrates' Court on 14 January 2010 after being charged with affray. Nelthorpe pleaded guilty to the charge of affray after appearing at York Crown Court on 1 September 2010.

== Career statistics ==
As of end of 2019–20 season

Appearances and goals by club, season and competition
Club	Season	League			FA Cup		League Cup		Other		Total	
Club	Season	Division	Apps	Goals	Apps	Goals	Apps	Goals	Apps	Goals	Apps	Goals
Frickley Athletic	2003–04	Northern Premier League; Premier Division	3	0	0	0	—		0	0	3	0
Doncaster Rovers	2004–05	League One	1	0	0	0	0	0	0	0	1	0
Doncaster Rovers	2005–06	League One	1	0	0	0	0	0	1 (Note: Appearance in Football League Trophy)	0	2	0
Doncaster Rovers	2006–07	League One	6	1	—		0	0	1	0	7	1
Doncaster Rovers	2007–08	League One	2	0	1	0	0	0	1	0	4	0
Doncaster Rovers	2008–09	Championship	0	0	—		0	0	—		0	0
Doncaster Rovers	Total		10	1	1	0	0	0	3	0	14	1
Hucknall Town (loan)	2005–06	Conference North	5	2	—		—		0	0	5	2
Kidderminster Harriers (loan)	2006–07	Conference National	4	0	2	1	—		—		6	1
Gateshead (loan)	2006–07	Northern Premier League; Premier Division	17	8	—		—		2 (Note: Appearance(s) in FA Trophy)	0	19	8
Halifax Town (loan)	2007–08	Conference Premier	7	2	—		—		3	1	10	3
Darlington (loan)	2007–08	League Two	7	0	—		—		1 (Note: Appearance in League Two play-offs)	0	8	0
Gateshead (loan)	2008–09	Conference North	12	1	—		—		3 (Note: Two appearances in Conference League Cup, one in FA Trophy)	0	15	1
Oxford United	2008–09	Conference Premier	16	2	—		—		—		16	2
York City	2009–10	Conference Premier	7	0	1	0	—		0	0	8	0
Barrow (loan)	2009–10	Conference Premier	6	2	—		—		0	0	6	2
Luton Town (loan)	2009–10	Conference Premier	8	0	—		—		—		8	0
Gateshead	2010–11	Conference Premier	34	5	2	0	—		5	0	41	5
Gainsborough Trinity	2011–12	Conference North	8	1	1	0	—		—		9	1
Eastwood Town	2011–12	Conference North	1	0	—		—		—		1	0
Frickley Athletic	2011–12	Northern Premier League; Premier Division	1	0	—		—		—		1	0
Gainsborough Trinity	2012–13	Conference North	32	5	0	0	—		5	0	37	5
Harrogate Town	2013–14	Conference North	34	4	0	0	—		0	0	34	4
Harrogate Town	2014–15	Conference North	17	3	0	0	—		1	0	18	3
Harrogate Town	Total		51	7	0	0	—		1	0	52	7
Matlock Town	2015–16	Northern Premier League; Premier Division	7	1	—		—		3 (Note: Two appearances in FA Trophy, one in Northern Premier League Challenge Cup)	0	10	1
North Ferriby United	2017–18	National League North	3	0	—		—		—		3	0
Ossett Town	2017–18	Northern Premier League; Division One North	12	0	—		—		—		12	0
Belper Town	2018–19	Northern Premier League; Division One East	3	1	1	0	—		0	0	4	1
Career total			254	38	8	1	0	0	26	1	288	40
