= Corey Barnes =

English footballer

Personal information
- Full name: Corey Barnes
- Date of birth: 1 January 1992 (age 34)
- Place of birth: Sunderland, England
- Height: 1.73 m (5 ft 8 in)
- Position: Midfielder

Youth career
- ?–2009: Darlington

Senior career*
Years	Team	Apps	(Gls)
2009–2011	Darlington	9	(0)
2010	→ Whitby Town (loan)	7	(0)
Total		16	(0)
- * Club domestic league appearances and goals as of 11 April 2011

Corey Barnes (born 1 January 1992) is an English professional footballer who plays as a midfielder. He last played for Darlington in 2011.

== Career ==
Born in Sunderland, Tyne and Wear, Barnes made his senior debut at the age of 16 for Darlington on 3 March 2009, against Notts County. Despite Barnes's youth, manager Dave Penney complimented him on his performance.

Barnes turned professional in the summer of 2010. In September 2010, he joined Whitby Town on a month's loan, where he played seven games in the Northern Premier League Premier Division. He was released by the club in June 2011.

== Career statistics ==
As of 11 April 2011

Appearances and goals by club, season and competition
Club	Season	League		FA Cup		League Cup		Other		Total	
Club	Season	Apps	Goals	Apps	Goals	Apps	Goals	Apps	Goals	Apps	Goals
Darlington	2008–09	3	0	0	0	0	0	0	0	3	0
Darlington	2009–10	6	0	1	0	0	0	1	0	8	0
Darlington	2010–11	0	0	0	0	0	0	0	0	0	0
Career total		9	0	1	0	0	0	1	0	11	0
