= Ryan Valentine =

Welsh footballer

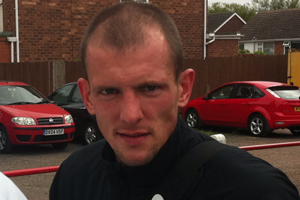

Personal information
- Full name: Ryan David Valentine
- Date of birth: 19 August 1982 (age 44)
- Place of birth: Wrexham, Wales
- Height: 5 ft 10 in (1.78 m)
- Position: Defender

Youth career
- ?–2000: Everton

Senior career*
Years	Team	Apps	(Gls)
2000–2002	Everton	0	(0)
2002–2006	Darlington	162	(4)
2006–2008	Wrexham	48	(2)
2008–2009	Darlington	47	(0)
2009–2011	Hereford United	55	(4)
2011–2013	AFC Telford United	70	(1)
2013–2019	Bala Town	110	(8)
Total		492	(19)

International career
2001–2002	Wales U21	8	(0)
- * Club domestic league appearances and goals

Ryan David Valentine (born 19 August 1982) is a Welsh former footballer who last played as a defender for Bala Town.

== Club career ==
Valentine signed for Wrexham on a free transfer after leaving Darlington in the summer of 2006.

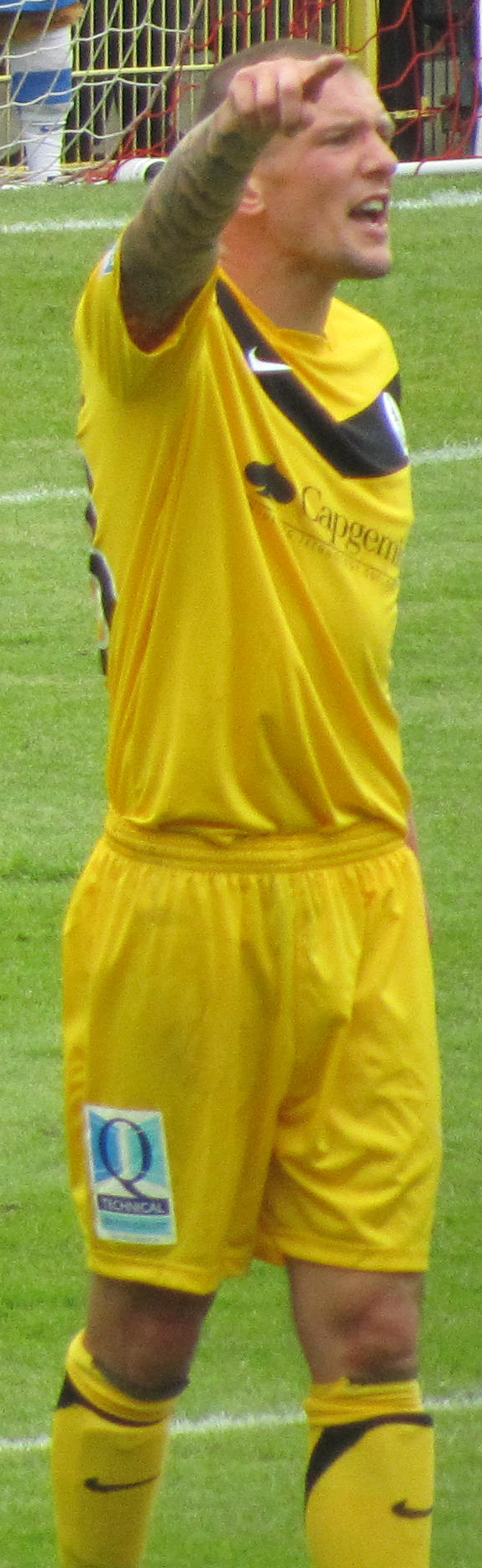
Ryan Valentine

Despite a sending off against Bury on 9 March 2007, Valentine played well for Wrexham. He played a vital part in their bid for survival, scoring the penalty in Wrexham's must win game on 5 May 2007 against Boston United which levelled the score at 1–1. Wrexham won the game 3–1 and stayed in the Football League. It was announced on 18 January 2008 that he has left Wrexham and rejoined his former club Darlington. On 29 May 2009 Valentine signed a one-year deal at League Two side Hereford United. Valentine later agreed a further year on his Hereford contract. After an injury hit season which kept him out for 5 months he was told at the end of the season that his contract would not be renewed at Hereford.

On 30 June 2011 he signed a one-year deal at AFC Telford United. Then at the end of the 2011–12 season he signed a new one-year contract with AFC Telford United. On 11 May 2013 it was announced he was released by Telford with five other players.

On 8 June 2013, Ryan was announced as a new signing for Bala Town, in the Welsh Premier League. He will be eligible to compete for the club in their first ever European fixtures in the qualifying rounds of the Europa League.

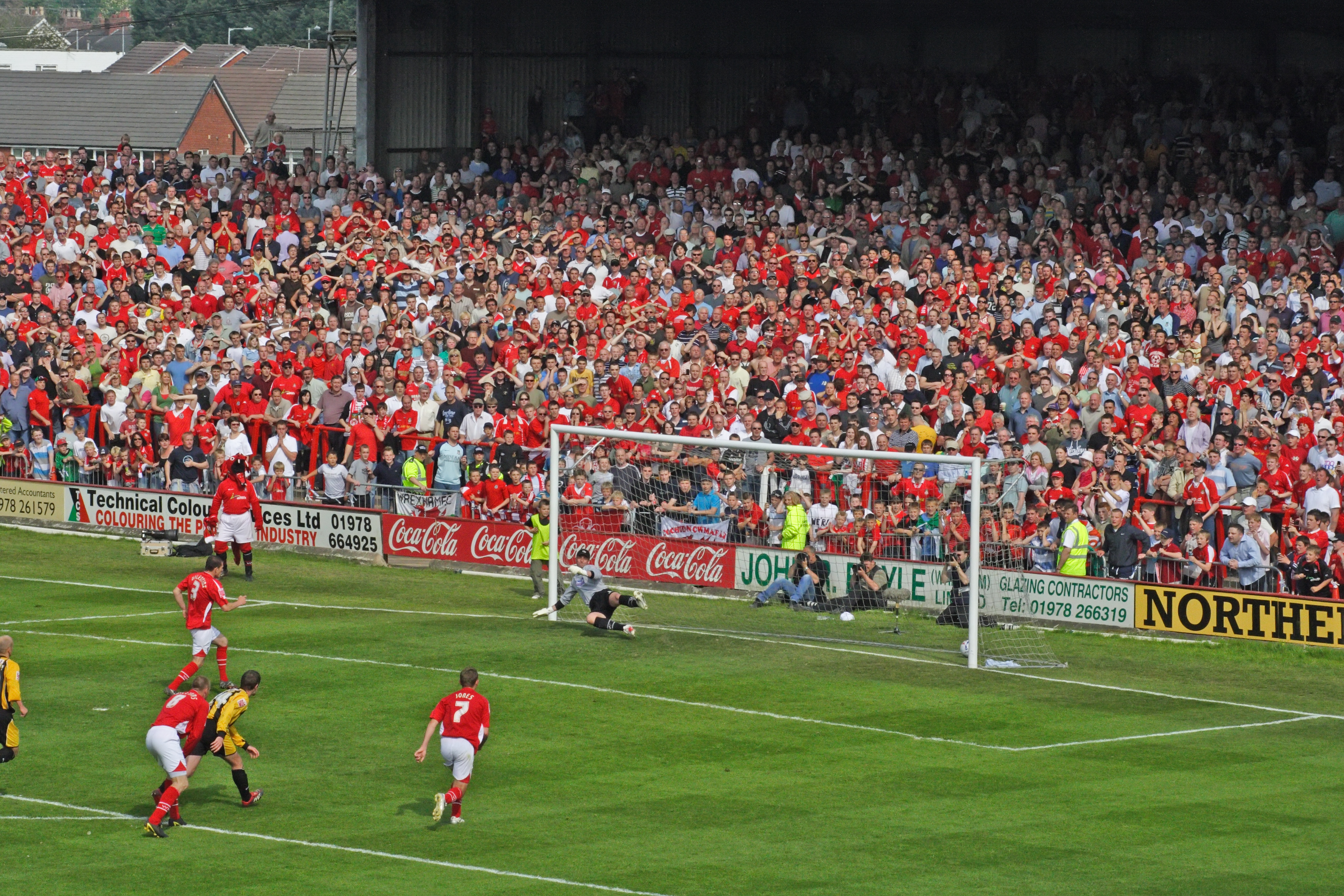
5 May 2007, Ryan Valentine scores the goal that keeps Wrexham in the Football League

== International career ==
Valentine played well in the 2006–07 season and got called up to the Wales national football team to face the Czech Republic and Brazil, and again to play Northern Ireland, but has yet to earn a cap.

== Career statistics ==
As of match played 26 January 2019

Appearances and goals by club, season and competition
Club	Season	League			National cup (Note: Includes FA Cup, Welsh Cup)		League cup (Note: Includes Football League Cup, Welsh League Cup)		Other		Total	
Club	Season	Division	Apps	Goals	Apps	Goals	Apps	Goals	Apps	Goals	Apps	Goals
Darlington	2002–03	Third Division	43	1	3	0	1	0	1 (Note: Appearance(s) in Football League Trophy)	0	48	1
Darlington	2003–04	Third Division	40	2	0	0	2	0	1	0	43	2
Darlington	2004–05	League Two	36	1	2	0	0	0	1	0	39	1
Darlington	2005–06	League Two	43	0	1	0	1	0	1	0	46	0
Darlington	Total		162	4	6	0	4	0	4	0	176	4
Wrexham	2006–07	League Two	34	2	1	0	1	0	1	0	37	2
Wrexham	2007–08	League Two	14	0	1	0	2	0	0	0	17	0
Wrexham	Total		48	2	2	0	3	0	1	0	54	2
Darlington	2007–08	League Two	17	0	—		—		—		17	0
Darlington	2008–09	League Two	31	0	2	0	1	0	0	0	34	0
Darlington	Total		48	0	2	0	1	0	0	0	51	0
Hereford United	2009–10	League Two	39	4	2	1	1	0	1	0	43	5
Hereford United	2010–11	League Two	16	0	0	0	1	0	1	0	18	0
Hereford United	Total		55	4	2	1	2	0	2	0	61	5
AFC Telford United	2011–12	Conference Premier	37	0	0	0	—		1 (Note: Appearance(s) in FA Trophy)	0	38	0
AFC Telford United	2012–13	Conference Premier	33	1	2	1	—		2	0	37	2
AFC Telford United	Total		70	1	2	1	—		3	0	75	2
Bala Town	2013–14	Welsh Premier League	31	5	2	0	3	0	2 (Note: Appearance(s) in UEFA Europa League)	0	38	5
Bala Town	2014–15	Welsh Premier League	27	3	0	0	2	0	0	0	29	3
Bala Town	2015–16	Welsh Premier League	23	0	1	0	0	0	2	0	26	0
Bala Town	2016–17	Welsh Premier League	15	0	0	0	1	0	3 (Note: One appearance in Scottish Challenge Cup; two appearances in UEFA Europa League)	0	19	0
Bala Town	2017–18	Welsh Premier League	13	0	0	0	0	0	0	0	13	0
Bala Town	2018–19	Welsh Premier League	1	0	1	0	0	0	0	0	2	0
Bala Town	Total		110	8	4	0	6	0	7	0	127	8
Career total			493	19	18	2	16	0	17	0	544	21
