= George Reynolds (businessman) =

British businessman (1936–2021)

- Born: 12 May 1936; Sunderland, England
- Died: 13 April 2021 (aged 84)
- Occupation: Owner of Darlington F.C. (1999–2004)
- Criminal penalty: Three years (2005) two weeks (2007)

George Reynolds (12 May 1936 – 13 April 2021) was a British businessman best known for his time as chairman of Darlington Football Club. He was found guilty of tax evasion in 2005.

== Football ==
Reynolds became the chairman of Darlington Football Club in 1999 and built the team a new stadium costing £20 million, which he named after himself. Reynolds was originally very popular with fans but he then took the club into administration and left the club in January 2004, just months after the new 25,000-seat stadium (one of the largest stadiums outside the Premier League) was opened. The stadium was renamed shortly afterwards. Darlington goalkeeper David Preece said shortly after he was transferred to Aberdeen F.C., the day before his debut against Celtic F.C., Reynolds called him threatening to cancel the transfer unless Preece signed a waiver of his £45,000 signing-on fee.

He famously declared his ambition to take Darlington into the Premier League, and when he took the club over they had been in the Football League's basement division since 1992. The new stadium did nothing to improve their on-field fortunes, and they did not move out of the basement division of the Football League until 2010 - when they were relegated to the Conference. The club was later relegated four divisions to the Northern Football League Division One and forced to reform as a new club, Darlington 1883, owned by the fans.

== Downfall ==
He was arrested on suspicion of money laundering in June 2004 after being stopped with £500,000 of cash in the boot of his car. He later pleaded guilty to charges of tax evasion and was sentenced to three years imprisonment in October 2005. Other charges which he denied, including money laundering, were left on file. Reynolds was released on 6 December 2006 but was electronically tagged and subject to a curfew. He was returned to prison for two weeks in April 2007 breaching the terms of his curfew. He later operated a vending machine company and worked from an E-Cigarette shop in Chester-le-Street.

== Personal life ==
Reynolds was brought up in Sunderland and in his early life became involved in crime. His first conviction was for stealing cigarettes, which he said he traded for food for his family. Another conviction in the 1960s saw him sent to jail for six months smuggling watches. In 1964 he was jailed for four years for safe-cracking, handling explosives, burglary and theft. He was jailed in 1970 for burglary and again in 1976 for theft.

Whilst in prison, a priest persuaded Reynolds to reform and begin studying. On his release, he established a series of businesses. These included a £25m kitchen surface factory based in Shildon. He amassed a £260 million fortune, and was ranked 112 in the Sunday Times rich list in 2000. Some extravagant purchases included a fleet of cars, a house next door to the Spice Girls in London, a yacht, a jet and a helicopter.

In 2000, he was the victim of an attempted mugging as he left a restaurant in North London with his wife and mother-in-law. Two men bundled him to the ground and tried to prise a diamond ring from his finger before removing his £41,000 Rolex watch. A third man demanded that Mrs Reynolds hand over her watch as well. But she began screaming and a dustbin man, who was working nearby, picked up a pole and chased off the gang who were subsequently arrested.

In the early 1990s, Reynolds separated from his second wife, Karen Brown, with whom he had two daughters.

He died on 13 April 2021, aged 84.
