= Neil Austin (footballer) =

English footballer

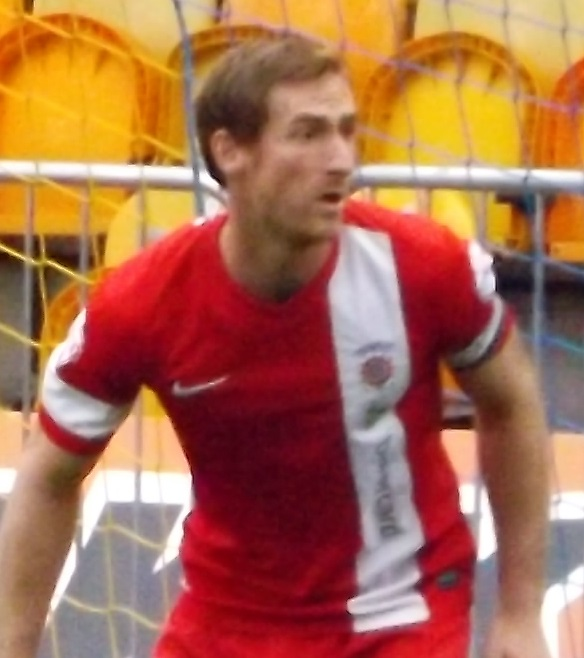
- Austin playing for Hartlepool United in 2013

Personal information
- Full name: Neil Jeffrey Austin
- Date of birth: 26 April 1983 (age 43)
- Place of birth: Barnsley, England
- Height: 5 ft 10 in (1.78 m)
- Position: Defender

Youth career
- 1998–2000: Barnsley

Senior career*
Years	Team	Apps	(Gls)
2000–2007	Barnsley	148	(0)
2002	→ Gateshead (loan)	3	(0)
2007–2009	Darlington	62	(5)
2009–2015	Hartlepool United	223	(10)
2015–2018	Shaw Lane	46	(0)
2018–2019	Gainsborough Trinity	35	(0)
Total		517	(15)

International career
1999–2000	England U16	9	(0)
2000–2001	England U17	4	(0)
2002–2003	England U20	3	(0)
- * Club domestic league appearances and goals as of 19:08, 13 July 2015 (UTC)

Neil Jeffrey Austin (born 26 April 1983) is an English former professional footballer who played as a defender.

He started his career at Barnsley, and spent time playing for Darlington and Hartlepool United in the Football League, and played at non-League level with Gateshead, Shaw Lane and Gainsborough Trinity. He also earned a combined 26 Youth international caps with England at U15 to U20 levels.

== Biography ==
=== Barnsley ===
Born in Barnsley, Austin came through the youth ranks with his local club Barnsley F.C., playing 165 first team games, including 25 games in the 2006–07 Championship season. He made his debut on 10 August 2002 against Swindon Town.

Despite struggling with an injury for a period of the 2005–06 season, Austin still managed to make 44 appearances for the reds helping them secure their return to the Football League Championship.

=== Darlington ===
In his first season at Darlington he played 29 games and scored 2 goals, his first was a mazy run from the edge of his own 18 yard box played a one – two then finished with aplomb. His season ended early though as he collected an injury that had plagued him the previous season.

In June 2008, Austin underwent an operation on his troublesome ankle which was successful. He scored his 1st goal of the season in Darlington's 6–0 away win at Macclesfield Town, it been a nice 25-yard drive. Live on Sky Austin netted a superb 25 yard free-kick against fellow promotion hopefuls Bradford City in Darlington's 2–1 victory. The tough tackling right back put Darlington's off field problems of administration to the side and went on to make 39 appearances scoring 3 goals and receiving 4 yellow cards in the 2008–09 season. Austin's superb form saw him voted in the League 2 Team of the Season.

=== Hartlepool United ===
In June 2009, he joined Darlington's arch rivals Hartlepool United and won the Player and Players' Player of the Year Award at the end of his first season with Pools.

His long range goal against Southampton in a 3–2 away defeat, in March 2010, won the club's Goal of the Season award and, in December 2019, was one of twenty goals that were nominated for the club's Goal of the Decade award.

An injury in early February 2011 saw Austin out injured until the final two games of the season with Steve Haslam replacing him at right-back. However, he regained his place next season and played every single minute of the 2012–13 campaign, the first Hartlepool player to do so since Tommy Miller in 1999–2000.

=== Shaw Lane ===
Following his release by Hartlepool in 2015, Austin signed for Shaw Lane. He helped Shaw Lane win the Northern Premier League Division 1 South 2016–17 title, winning the Players Player of the Year award in the process.

=== Gainsborough Trinity ===
After 3 seasons with Shaw Lane, Austin joined Gainsborough Trinity following a successful trial. He made a total of 39 appearances for Gainsborough and, following the conclusion of the 2018–19 season, retired from football.

== Personal life ==
He is a qualified dual fuel engineer and has also coached football at grassroots level.

== Career statistics ==
Appearances and goals by club, season and competition
Club	Season	League			FA Cup		League Cup		Other		Total	
Club	Season	Division	Apps	Goals	Apps	Goals	Apps	Goals	Apps	Goals	Apps	Goals
Barnsley	2002–03	Second Division	34	0	1	0	0	0	0	0	35	0
Barnsley	2003–04	Second Division	38	0	5	0	1	0	0	0	44	0
Barnsley	2004–05	League One	15	0	0	0	0	0	0	0	15	0
Barnsley	2005–06	League One	38	0	5	0	1	0	1	0	45	0
Barnsley	2006–07	Championship	24	0	1	0	1	0	0	0	26	0
Barnsley	Total		149	0	12	0	3	0	1	0	165	0
Darlington	2007–08	League Two	29	2	1	0	0	0	0	0	30	2
Darlington	2008–09	League Two	33	3	2	0	2	0	3	0	40	3
Darlington	Total		62	5	3	0	2	0	3	0	70	5
Hartlepool United	2009–10	League One	39	3	1	0	0	0	1	0	41	3
Hartlepool United	2010–11	League One	24	2	4	0	0	0	2	0	30	2
Hartlepool United	2011–12	League One	46	1	1	0	1	0	1	0	49	1
Hartlepool United	2012–13	League One	39	2	1	0	1	0	1	0	42	2
Hartlepool United	2013–14	League Two	29	0	3	0	1	1	3	0	36	1
Hartlepool United	2014–15	League Two	46	2	2	0	1	1	1	0	50	3
Hartlepool United	Total		223	10	12	0	4	2	9	0	248	12
Career total			434	15	27	0	9	2	13	0	483	17

== Honours ==
Barnsley

- Football League One play-offs: 2006

Individual

- PFA Team of the Year: 2008–09 League Two
- Hartlepool United Player of the Year: 2009–10
- Shaw Lane Players Player of the Year: 2016–17
