= Jason Kennedy (footballer) =

English footballer (born 1986)

Personal information
- Full name: Jason Brian Kennedy
- Date of birth: 11 September 1986 (age 40)
- Place of birth: Roseworth, England
- Height: 6 ft 1 in (1.85 m)
- Position: Midfielder

Youth career
- –2005: Middlesbrough

Senior career*
Years	Team	Apps	(Gls)
2005–2008	Middlesbrough	4	(0)
2006–2007	→ Boston United (loan)	13	(1)
2007	→ Bury (loan)	12	(0)
2007–2008	→ Livingston (loan)	18	(2)
2008	→ Darlington (loan)	13	(2)
2008–2009	Darlington	46	(5)
2009–2013	Rochdale	177	(12)
2013–2015	Bradford City	28	(3)
2014	→ Rochdale (loan)	7	(0)
2015	→ Carlisle United (loan)	11	(3)
2015–2019	Carlisle United	83	(11)
2019–2020	Hartlepool United	18	(2)
2020	→ Spennymoor Town (loan)	7	(0)
2020–2022	Spennymoor Town	15	(0)
2022	→ Marske United (loan)	7	(1)
2022–2024	Marske United	67	(6)
2024	Redcar Athletic	3	(0)
2024–2026	Whitby Town	4	(0)
Total		533	(49)

Managerial career
- 2026: Whitby Town (joint-manager)
- * Club domestic league appearances and goals

Jason Brian Kennedy (born 11 September 1986) is an English former professional footballer who played as a midfielder.

In his 12-year-long playing career, Kennedy spent most of his career with Rochdale with whom he signed in 2009, going on to appear in 177 official games. Apart from Rochdale, Kennedy has previously played for Middlesbrough, Darlington, and has had loan spells with Boston United, and Bury. In 2013, he signed for Bradford City.

== Club career ==
=== Middlesbrough ===
Kennedy started his career at Middlesbrough. He made his debut for the North East of England club in the 2004–05 season, in a game against Fulham. He made six appearances, four of which were as substitute, in 2005–06, and participated in Middlesbrough's UEFA Cup run in the season against Litex Lovech, playing the full game.

Kennedy was handed a two-year contract in 2005 by manager Steve McClaren. He joined Scottish Football League club Livingston in August 2007 on a six-month loan deal.

=== Darlington ===
He made another loan move in 2008, this time to League Two side Darlington. On 10 May 2008, Kennedy scored the first goal in the League Two play-off semi-final first leg between Darlington and Rochdale. Darlington went on to win the match 2–1. However, in the second leg he missed his kick in a penalty shoot-out, sending Rochdale through to the play-off final. On 30 May 2008 Kennedy signed a two-year permanent deal with Darlington.

=== Rochdale ===
On 20 May 2009 Kennedy signed a two-year deal with Rochdale. He scored his first goal for the club on 28 August 2010 in a 3–1 win against Brentford, but was sent-off as celebrating his goal with the fans earned him a second yellow card. He followed these up with goals against MK Dons, Huddersfield Town and Charlton Athletic and ended the season with 4 goals. He played his final game for the club on 27 April 2013, helping Rochdale to a 1–0 win against Plymouth Argyle. He left having made over 200 appearances for the club during a four-year spell and was part of the 2009–10 promotion winning team.

=== Bradford City ===
On 2 July 2013, Kennedy signed for Bradford City on a free transfer following the expiry of his contract, on a two-year deal. He had almost signed for the club during the previous transfer window, and rejected the chance to stay at Rochdale as well as an offer from Hartlepool United to sign with The Bantams. He made his league debut on 5 October in a 2–0 win away to Walsall.

=== Rochdale Return ===
On 24 January, Kennedy moved to Rochdale on loan until the end of the 2013–14 season.

=== Carlisle United ===
On 12 March 2015, Kennedy completed a one-month loan deal to League Two club Carlisle United. He made a bright start to his Carlisle career, scoring his first goal on his second start for the Blues, a 2–0 away victory over Northampton.

In May 2015 it was announced Kennedy would leave Bradford City at the end of the season. Kennedy returned to Carlisle the same week signing a permanent two-year deal

He was released by Carlisle at the end of the 2018–19 season.

=== Hartlepool United ===
Following a successful trial, Kennedy signed for Hartlepool United on 18 July 2019.

=== Spennymoor Town ===
Kennedy signed for National League North side Spennymoor Town on loan till the end of the season

Kennedy became a player-coach at Spennymoor in May 2021.

On 11 January 2022, Kennedy joined Northern Premier League Division One East side Marske United on a two-month loan deal.

=== Marske United ===
On 25 February 2022, Kennedy joined Northern Premier League Division One East side Marske United on a permanent deal.

In October 2024, Kennedy announced his retirement.

== Career statistics ==
Appearances and goals by club, season and competition
Club	Season	League			National Cup		League Cup		Other		Total	
Club	Season	Division	Apps	Goals	Apps	Goals	Apps	Goals	Apps	Goals	Apps	Goals
Middlesbrough	2004–05	Premier League	1	0	0	0	0	0	0	0	1	0
Middlesbrough	2005–06	Premier League	3	0	0	0	0	0	3 (Note: Appearances in the UEFA Cup)	0	6	0
Middlesbrough	Total		4	0	0	0	0	0	3	0	7	0
Boston United (loan)	2006–07	League Two	13	1	0	0	0	0	0	0	13	1
Bury (loan)	2006–07	League Two	12	0	0	0	0	0	0	0	12	0
Livingston (loan)	2007–08	Scottish First Division	18	2	1	0	2	0	1 (Note: Appearance in the Scottish Challenge Cup)	0	22	2
Darlington	2007–08	League Two	13	2	0	0	0	0	2 (Note: Appearances in the League Two play-offs)	1	15	3
Darlington	2008–09	League Two	46	5	2	0	2	1	3 (Note: Appearances in the Football League Trophy)	0	53	6
Darlington	Total		59	7	2	0	2	1	3	0	107	18
Rochdale	2009–10	League Two	42	0	2	0	1	0	1	0	46	0
Rochdale	2010–11	League One	45	4	1	0	2	0	0	0	48	4
Rochdale	2011–12	League One	44	4	1	0	3	0	2	0	50	4
Rochdale	2012–13	League Two	46	4	2	1	1	2	0	0	49	7
Rochdale	Total		177	12	6	1	7	2	3	0	193	15
Bradford City	2013–14	League One	8	1	1	0	1	0	1	0	11	1
Bradford City	2014–15	League One	20	2	2	0	3	0	1	0	26	2
Bradford City	Total		28	3	3	0	4	0	2	0	37	3
Rochdale (loan)	2013–14	League Two	7	0	0	0	0	0	0	0	7	0
Carlisle United	2014–15	League Two	11	3	0	0	0	0	0	0	11	3
Carlisle United	2015–16	League Two	44	2	4	0	2	1	0	0	50	3
Carlisle United	2016–17	League Two	27	9	2	1	1	0	2 (Note: One appearance in the EFL Trophy and one in the League Two play-offs)	1	32	11
Carlisle United	2017–18	League Two	6	0	0	0	1	0	1 (Note: Appearance in the EFL Trophy)	1	8	1
Carlisle United	2018–19	League Two	6	0	0	0	0	0	0	0	6	0
Carlisle United	Total		94	14	6	1	4	1	3	2	107	18
Hartlepool United	2019–20	National League	18	2	1	0	0	0	1	0	20	2
Spennymoor Town	2019–20	National League North	7	0	0	0	0	0	0	0	7	0
Spennymoor Town	2020–21	National League North	9	0	0	0	0	0	2	0	11	0
Spennymoor Town	2021–22	National League North	6	0	0	0	0	0	1	0	7	0
Spennymoor Town	Total		22	0	0	0	0	0	3	0	25	0
Marske United	2021–22	NPL East Division	17	4	0	0	0	0	3	1	20	5
Marske United	2022–23	NPL Premier Division	39	2	3	0	0	0	6	0	48	2
Marske United	2023–24	NPL Premier Division	18	1	2	0	0	0	2	0	22	1
Marske United	Total		74	7	5	0	0	0	11	1	90	7
Redcar Athletic	2023-24	Northern League Division One	3	0	0	0	0	0	0	0	3	0
Whitby Town	2024–25	NPL Premier Division	3	0	0	0	0	0	1	0	4	0
Whitby Town	2025–26	NPL Premier Division	1	0	0	0	0	0	0	0	1	0
Whitby Town	Total		4	0	0	0	0	0	1	0	5	0
Career total			533	49	24	2	19	4	33	4	609	58

== Managerial statistics ==
Managerial record by team and tenure
Team	From	To	Record					Ref.
Team	From	To	P	W	D	L	Win %	Ref.
Whitby Town (joint-manager)	10 February 2026	29 April 2026	14	2	5	7	14.3	
Total			14	2	5	7	14.3	

== Honours ==
Middlesbrough

- FA Youth Cup: 2003–04
- UEFA Cup runner-up: 2005–06

Rochdale

- League Two promotion: 2009–10, 2013–14
