= Ian Miller (footballer, born 1983) =

English footballer (born 1983)

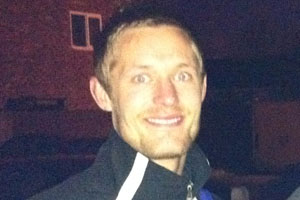
- Miller in 2011

Personal information
- Full name: Ian Jonathan Miller
- Date of birth: 23 November 1983 (age 42)
- Place of birth: Colchester, England
- Height: 6 ft 2 in (1.88 m)
- Position: Defender

Team information
- Current team: Walsham-le-Willows

Youth career
- 1999–2004: Bury Town

Senior career*
Years	Team	Apps	(Gls)
2004–2006	Bury Town		
2006–2008	Ipswich Town	1	(0)
2006–2007	→ Boston United (loan)	12	(0)
2007	→ Darlington (loan)	7	(1)
2007–2008	→ Darlington (loan)	13	(1)
2008–2011	Darlington	130	(8)
2011–2013	Grimsby Town	46	(4)
2013–2015	Cambridge United	49	(0)
2015	Braintree Town	1	(0)
2015–2017	Needham Market	20	(2)
2017–2018	AFC Sudbury		
2018–2019	Bury Town	32	(0)
2019–	Walsham-le-Willows	0	(0)
- * Club domestic league appearances and goals as of 21:10, 13 July 2019 (UTC)

Ian Jonathan Miller (born 23 November 1983) is an English professional footballer who plays for Walsham-le-Willows.

As a player he was a defender. After starting his career in non-League football with Bury Town, Miller moved into the Football League with Ipswich Town. He also spent time on loan in the lower divisions of the Football League at Boston United and Darlington, before joining Darlington on a permanent basis in 2008. He left that club in late 2011 and joined Grimsby Town soon afterwards before a two-year stint with Cambridge United. He remained with United as a community football manager whilst playing semi-professionally for Braintree Town, Needham Market, AFC Sudbury and Walsham-le-Willows.

== Playing career ==
=== Bury Town ===
Born in Colchester, Essex, Miller began his career with Isthmian League Division One North team Bury Town, with whom he reached the semi-final of the FA Vase. He signed a new one-and-a-half-year contract in January 2006, and was appointed as captain at the start of the 2006–07 season.

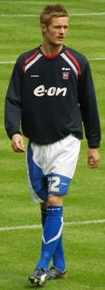
Miller at Ipswich

=== Ipswich Town ===
He was signed by Ipswich Town on 22 September 2006 for a nominal fee on a contract until June 2007.

Miller joined League Two side Boston United on a month-long loan in November 2006. This loan at Boston was extended until January 2007. He then joined another League Two side, Darlington, on a month's loan in February 2007. The loan was extended until April 2007, but Miller was recalled in late March to cover for injuries in Ipswich's squad. He made his sole appearance for Ipswich on 31 March 2007, as a substitute in the 74th minute for Jonathan Walters in their Championship fixture in the 3–1 victory over Plymouth Argyle.

Miller agreed a new one-year contract with Ipswich in June 2007 and subsequently re-joined Darlington on an initial month's loan. It was extended until January 2008.

=== Darlington ===
On 11 January 2008 Miller joined Darlington permanently on a free transfer, signing a one-and-a-half-year contract.

On 10 May 2008, Miller came on as an 87th-minute substitute in the League Two play-off semi-final first leg against Rochdale, replacing the injured Alan White. With the game tied at 1–1, Miller rose to head a 92nd-minute winner from a Neil Wainwright direct free kick, to give Darlington the lead heading into the second leg.

After Darlington's players were asked to take a pay cut in November 2011, and Miller did not receive his wages for that month, he handed in his notice and left the club in December 2011.

=== Grimsby Town ===
Miller signed a 16-month contract with Conference National club Grimsby Town and made his debut in the starting eleven as the "Mariners" beat Lincoln City 3–1 on 1 January 2012. On 17 February 2012 he scored the equaliser in the 1–2 away victory at Southport, which was also his first goal for Grimsby, a corner from Frankie Artus was met with a powerful header by Miller inside the six-yard box. Miller was ever present for Grimsby during the 2012–13 season and played in the FA Trophy final at Wembley Stadium which ended in a defeat on penalties to Wrexham. The club had also led the Conference for a small part of the season but fell off towards the end and were eventually defeated in the play-offs by Newport County.

Miller was released by the club on 3 May 2013.

=== Cambridge United ===
On 3 June 2013, Miller signed for Cambridge United on a two-year deal. At the end of the 2014–15 season the club did not offer him a new deal when his contract expired.

As captain he led the team to a second-place finish and F.A Trophy glory at Wembley. During the play-off final Miller received a ruptured Achilles' tendon in the final minutes of the game, despite this he still lifted the trophy whilst in a wheelchair as they won 2–1 against Gateshead, sending the club into the Football League. The injury ruled him out for the majority of the next season. After playing very few games he was released on a free transfer.

=== Non-League ===
In 2015 Miller signed a short-term deal with The National League side Braintree Town but only featured in one game before joining Needham Market.

In August 2017 Miller became a coach at the AFC Sudbury academy. He signed for the club as a player in December 2017. In August 2018, Miller returned to Bury Town as a player-coach.

On 27 June 2019 it was confirmed, that Miller had joined Walsham-le-Willows.

== Coaching career ==
On 13 April 2018 Miller became a coach for the AFC Sudbury women's team.

Since retiring from playing, Miller has adopted the role of head coach at 442 Football Academy.

== Personal life ==
He holds a degree in sports, health and exercise from Anglia Ruskin University.

== Honours ==
Darlington

- FA Trophy: 2010–11

Cambridge

- Conference Premier play-offs: 2014
- FA Trophy: 2013–14
