= Gregg Blundell =

English footballer and physiotherapist

Personal information
- Full name: Gregg Steven Blundell
- Date of birth: 3 October 1977 (age 49)
- Place of birth: Liverpool, England
- Position: Striker

Senior career*
Years	Team	Apps	(Gls)
1994–1997	Tranmere Rovers	0	(0)
1997	Knowsley United		
1997–2001	Vauxhall Motors		
2001–2003	Northwich Victoria	90	(39)
2003–2005	Doncaster Rovers	86	(28)
2005–2007	Chester City	57	(12)
2007–2009	Darlington	71	(10)
2008	→ Accrington Stanley (loan)	2	(0)
2009	Chester City		
2009	→ Barrow (loan)	19	(2)
2010–2011	Barrow	9	(0)
Total		334	(91)

International career
2003	England C	1	(0)
- * Club domestic league appearances and goals

Gregg Steven Blundell (born 3 October 1977) is an English retired footballer who played as a striker. He is now a physiotherapist for Liverpool. Prior to his appointment at Tranmere, he combined playing football and being the club's physiotherapist at Barrow AFC in the Conference National.

== Football career ==
=== Early career ===
Gregg started as a trainee at Tranmere Rovers but was released. After a spell with Knowsley United, he began a prolific scoring record with Vauxhall Motors, who rose through the non-league pyramid in his spell there. The goals continued to flow after a move to Football Conference club Northwich Victoria in 2001. Despite playing for a side in the bottom half of the table, Blundell had a strong scoring record. This prompted a move to Conference promotion chasers Doncaster Rovers in March 2003.

=== Doncaster Rovers ===
Blundell's first season with Rovers ended with his promotion to the Football League, after play-off wins over future club Chester City and Dagenham & Redbridge. His belated Football League debut at Leyton Orient on 9 August 2003 saw him open the scoring in a 3–1 win, as Rovers went on to win the Division Three title. Blundell scored 18 goals during the season.

However, many Rovers fans felt that he had reached his level at League one and despite being given chances in the first team, he never managed to achieve the success he had the season before.

=== Chester City ===
Blundell was signed by Chester City from Doncaster Rovers for a Club Record Fee in July 2005 (reputedly £105,000). He made a quick impact with Chester, bagging six goals by the end of September 2005 as Chester challenged for promotion from Football League Two. But his season was to lie in tatters after an injury sustained against Rochdale on 7 October 2005. After missing three months out injured, just one more goal was managed before the end of the season. His confidence was still never fully recovered the following season and Chester accepted a nominal bid for Blundell from Darlington as transfer deadline day approached in January 2007.

=== Darlington ===
He was re-united with former manager Dave Penney at Darlington. Again the goals did not flow in the rest of the season, but he did score a late penalty equaliser on his return to Chester in April 2007. Apart from a loan spell with Accrington Stanley, Blundell remained at Darlington until the summer of 2009 when he returned to Chester who had just suffered relegation to the Conference National.

=== Chester and Barrow ===
Blundell stayed just a half a season with Chester, scoring three goals in eighteen league games, before moving to Barrow AFC on loan as Chester looked to cut costs. With Chester unable to pay their players, Blundell left in January 2010, signing permanently with Barrow.

On 13 March 2010, Gregg scored the only goal of the match as Barrow beat Salisbury City in the 1st Leg of the FA Trophy Semi Final at Salisbury. He remained with Barrow for the following season, but left in June 2011.

== Personal life ==
He graduated from the University of Salford in 2008 with a degree in Physiotherapy and has been studying for a master's degree in Football Rehabilitation at Edge Hill University.

Blundell is the uncle of Tranmere Rovers midfielder James Wallace.

== Physiotherapy career ==
After combining playing football and physiotherapy at Barrow, he retired from professional football at the end of the 2010–11 season and on 21 June 2011 Tranmere Rovers confirmed his appointment as the club's new physiotherapist. Since 2016, he has been a physiotherapist for Liverpool

== Honours ==
=== As a player ===
Doncaster Rovers

- Football League Third Division: 2003–04

Barrow

- FA Trophy: 2009–10

Individual

- Football Conference Goalscorer of the Month: August 2002
