= Neil Wainwright =

English footballer

Personal information
- Full name: Neil Wainwright
- Date of birth: 4 November 1977 (age 48)
- Place of birth: Warrington, England
- Height: 6 ft 1 in (1.85 m)
- Position: Midfielder

Team information
- Current team: Morecambe (joint-caretaker manager)

Senior career*
Years	Team	Apps	(Gls)
1996–1998	Wrexham	11	(3)
1998–2001	Sunderland	2	(0)
1999–2000	→ Darlington (loan)	17	(4)
2000–2001	→ Halifax Town (loan)	13	(0)
2001–2008	Darlington	235	(24)
2007	→ Shrewsbury Town (loan)	3	(0)
2008	→ Mansfield Town (loan)	5	(0)
2008–2011	Morecambe	60	(1)
2009	→ Barrow (loan)	5	(0)
2010	→ Barrow (loan)	6	(0)
2011	Kendal Town	3	(1)
2012	Darlington	12	(0)
2012–2013	Lancaster City	11	(0)
Total		383	(33)

Managerial career
- 2012–2013: Lancaster City
- 2026: Morecambe (joint-caretaker)
- * Club domestic league appearances and goals

Neil Wainwright (born 4 November 1977) is an English former footballer. He is assistant coach at Morecambe.

Wainwright played most of his football on the wing or in more recent times at full back. His former clubs include Wrexham, Sunderland and Darlington. He returned to Darlington in February 2012 signing a short-term contract, before the club folded in the summer.

== Career ==
Wainwright began his career as a trainee at Wrexham in July 1996, making 11 league appearances in two season before joining Sunderland for a fee of £100,000 in July 1998. He made only two substitute appearances in the league and six in the League Cup for Sunderland before being loaned to Darlington in February 2000 for the rest of the 2000–01 season. He joined Halifax Town on loan in October 2000 for three months and then returned to Darlington on a permanent transfer for a fee of £50,000 in August 2001, where he made over 270 appearances in all competitions and was the club's player of the year in the 2006–07 season, but after making only six first-team appearances for Darlington at the start of the 2007–08 season he joined Shrewsbury Town on a one-month loan in October 2007. He later joined Mansfield Town in March 2008 until the end of the 2007–08 season but was recalled by Darlington a month later having made five appearances for Mansfield.

Following Darlington's failure to gain promotion from Football League Two in the 2007–08 season, Wainwright was one of several players surprisingly released by the club in May 2008. He joined Morecambe in June 2008 and excelled in a left wing-back role before his season was cut short by an achilles injury. In 2011, Wainwright was released by Morecambe. Wainwright scored once during his spell at the club, in a 3–1 defeat to Rotherham United.

On 28 February 2012, Wainwright re-signed for former club Darlington, who were in severe financial straits and battling relegation from the Conference National following a 10-point deduction for entering administration in December 2011. He had been playing for Kendal Town prior to his signing for Darlington; making his league debut on 27 September 2011 and scoring in a 3–3 draw with Marine, Wainwright would go on to play in two more league matches, alongside seven cup appearances, before leaving Kendal in November 2011. Wainwright made his second Darlington debut on 3 March 2012, in a 0–1 home loss to Stockport County; he wore the number 26 shirt and was replaced by Clark Keltie in the 67th minute. He left the club in the summer of 2012 as the club were relegated and folded to reform as Darlington 1883 in the Northern Football League. For the start of the 2012–13 season Wainwright signed as a player for Northern Premier League club Lancaster City taking over as joint manager of the club in October 2012 before leaving in February 2013.

== Coaching career ==
In September 2025, Wainwright was appointed first-team assistant coach of National League club Morecambe, having previously held the role of head of academy coaching. He was briefly joint-caretaker manager alongside Lee Tomlin in January 2026 following the sacking of Ashvir Singh Johal.

== Career statistics ==
Appearances and goals by club, season and competition
Club	Season	League			FA Cup		League Cup		Other		Total	
Club	Season	Division	Apps	Goals	Apps	Goals	Apps	Goals	Apps	Goals	Apps	Goals
Wrexham	1997–98	Division Two	11	3	1	0	0	0	7 (Note: Six appearances in FAW Invitation Cup; one appearance in Football League Trophy)	0	19	3
Sunderland	1998–99	Division One	2	0	0	0	3	0	—		5	0
Sunderland	1999–2000	Premier League	0	0	0	0	2	0	—		2	0
Sunderland	2000–01	Premier League	0	0	—		1	0	—		1	0
Sunderland	Total		2	0	0	0	6	0	—		8	0
Darlington (loan)	1999–2000	Division Three	17	4	—		—		—		17	4
Halifax Town (loan)	2000–01	Division Three	13	0	1	0	—		2 (Note: Appearance(s) in Football League Trophy)	0	16	0
Darlington	2001–02	Division Three	35	4	4	2	0	0	2	0	41	6
Darlington	2002–03	Division Three	33	1	3	0	1	0	0	0	37	1
Darlington	2003–04	Division Three	35	7	1	0	0	0	0	0	36	7
Darlington	2004–05	League Two	38	4	2	0	1	0	1	0	42	4
Darlington	2005–06	League Two	39	3	1	0	1	0	1	0	42	3
Darlington	2006–07	League Two	41	5	2	0	2	0	3	0	48	5
Darlington	2007–08	League Two	14	0	—		0	0	3 (Note: Two appearances in League Two play-offs; one appearance in Football League Trophy)	0	17	0
Darlington	Total		235	24	13	2	5	0	10	0	263	26
Shrewsbury Town (loan)	2007–08	League Two	3	0	0	0	—		—		3	0
Mansfield Town (loan)	2007–08	League Two	5	0	—		—		—		5	0
Morecambe	2008–09	League Two	38	1	1	0	1	0	3	0	43	1
Morecambe	2009–10	League Two	17	0	1	0	1	0	1	0	20	0
Morecambe	2010–11	League Two	5	0	1	0	0	0	0	0	6	0
Morecambe	Total		60	1	3	0	2	0	4	0	69	1
Barrow (loan)	2009–10	Conference National	5	0	0	0	—		—		5	0
Barrow (loan)	2010–11	Conference National	6	0	0	0	—		—		6	0
Barrow (loan)	Total		11	0	0	0	—		—		11	0
Kendal Town	2011–12	Northern Premier League Premier Division	3	1	2	0	—		6 (Note: Three appearances in FA Trophy; three appearances in Lancashire FA Challenge Trophy)	0	11	1
Darlington	2011–12	Conference National	12	0	—		—		—		12	0
Lancaster City	2012–13	Northern Premier League Division One North	11	0	3	0	—		3 (Note: One appearance in FA Trophy; one appearance in Northern Premier League Challenge Cup; one appearance in Lancashire FA Challenge Trophy)	0	17	0
Career total			383	33	23	2	13	0	32	0	451	35

== Honours ==
=== As a player ===
Darlington

- Division Three Play-off Final runner-up: 1999–00
