= Rob Purdie =

English footballer (born 1982)

Personal information
- Full name: Robert James Purdie
- Date of birth: 28 September 1982 (age 44)
- Place of birth: Leicester, England
- Height: 5 ft 9 in (1.75 m)
- Position: Midfielder

Youth career
- 2001–2002: Leicester City

Senior career*
| Years | Team | Apps | (Gls) |
| 2002–2007 | Hereford United | 184 | (21) |
| 2007–2009 | Darlington | 79 | (5) |
| 2009–2011 | Oldham Athletic | 0 | (0) |
| 2010 | → Hereford United (loan) | 6 | (2) |
| 2011–2012 | Hereford United | 53 | (5) |
| 2012–2013 | Shrewsbury Town | 23 | (0) |
| 2013–2014 | Hereford United | 29 | (0) |
| 2014–2015 | Tamworth | 18 | (0) |
| 2015–2018 | Hereford | 37 | (9) |
| Total | | 429 | (42) |

International career
| 2004 | England C | 2 | (0) |

Managerial career
- 2014: Tamworth (caretaker)
- * Club domestic league appearances and goals

Robert James Purdie (born 28 September 1982) is an English retired footballer who last played for Hereford as a midfielder.

Purdie was a versatile Utility player who played primarily as an attacking midfielder, but he could also play in the full-back position, in midfield, or in the "hole" as a striker.

== Playing career ==
=== Hereford United ===
He began his career at Leicester City where he played for the U19 and reserve teams, but not for the first team. In his final season he played several matches for Hereford United's reserves before signing for them in July 2002. In his first season at Hereford most of his appearances were as a substitute, but as the season progressed he started matches more regularly. He started the 2003–04. playing alongside Steve Guinan up front, a partnership that saw the team top the Conference in the first part of the season. He moved back into midfield for the latter part of that season, finishing with 9 goals from 41 appearances. Unfortunately the team failed to progress in the play-offs despite finishing the season with 91 points and equalling the record for goals scored in a season.

The 2004–05 season was less successful as he was in and out of the side due to injuries, and Hereford again failed to gain promotion as they missed out in the play-offs. The 2005–06 season saw Purdie make more appearances than any other Hereford player, he missed only one match due to injury. His season finished with an eventful play-off final in his home city of Leicester. While Halifax Town were taking the lead he was off the field receiving treatment, after he got knocked in the face. This broke his front teeth, and the bleeding from this caused him to change his shirt 3 times during the match. In the second half he had a decent shout for a penalty which was not given, when he went down in the penalty area. Not that it mattered, as Hereford went on to win the match.

He signed a new contract in June 2006 and was made club captain after the departure of Tony James. His first season in the Football League saw him appear in 44 out of 46 league matches with a further 7 appearances in cup competitions, thus making more first team appearances than any other player. He scored 9 goals in all competitions, 8 of which were from the penalty spot, which made him the second highest goalscorer for Hereford. Midway through the season he was moved from a midfield role into the left-back position, underlining his versatility. At the end of the season he was voted the Supporters Player of the Year, and also picked up the award for Away Player of the Year. At the time of his departure, he was the longest serving player at the club, and his 223 first team appearances rank him 33rd on the all-time list of appearances for Hereford United.

=== Darlington ===
In June 2007 Purdie turned down a new contract at Hereford to sign a two-year deal with fellow League Two side Darlington. He was voted player of the season in 08–09.

=== Oldham Athletic ===
Purdie became Dave Penney's first signing for Oldham Athletic, signing a two-year contract on 22 May 2009.

Purdie announced his retirement from non-league international football on Tuesday 24 November 2009 claiming his main aim was to get fit and play for Oldham.

In July 2010 he was transfer-listed by the club, along with five other first team players.

He re-joined Hereford United on loan on 29 October 2010 and scored two goals in his first game for the club against Stockport County the next day.

On 31 January 2011, Purdie was released by Oldham Athletic after having never played a first team game for the club over a period of two years there. He then re-signed for Hereford United.

=== Shrewsbury Town ===
On 3 July 2012, Purdie signed for Shrewsbury Town on a free transfer following the expiration of his contract at Hereford United, linking up with Turner and Trewick once more. Purdie went on the explain he "jumped at the chance" to sign after having an injury ravaged time with Oldham Athletic and that Graham Turner knows what he is getting with a player like him; "I'm honest off the pitch, hardworking, and will do my job, and I think [Graham Turner] understands that."

After a very positive start to the season, playing mainly at left back before switching to the left/right wing around the New Year period, Purdie struggled to keep his place in the team and fell out of favour in the second half of the 2012–13 season, making only sporadic substitute appearances in his final months, despite his generally good form and consistency. Purdie was released on 29 April 2013.

=== Hereford United ===
In the summer of 2013 Purdie signed yet again for Hereford United. This time round Purdie took up two roles as both a player and a coach. This was Purdie's third spell with Hereford United having played over 200 league games for them.

=== Tamworth ===
On 26 July 2014, Purdie signed a contract with Conference North side Tamworth, he was signed predominately as a left back. Following a disappointing start to the season, manager Dale Belford left the club, and Purdie was asked to take over on a caretaker basis, with Paul Green acting as caretaker assistant manager. The pair only led the team for one game, a 1–1 home draw with Colwyn Bay.

=== Hereford F.C. ===
In June 2015, Purdie returned to play for a Hereford club, this time to play for Hereford, the newly formed phoenix club. Purdie was the club's seventh signing for the upcoming Midland Football League season. He scored in the opening goal in the FA Vase final after 75 seconds, however Hereford lost 4–1 to Morpeth Town. Purdie helped the club to win the league by scoring the opener away at Alvechurch in what was considered to be the title decider, which Hereford won 2–1 and the club went on to be promoted from the Midland Football League. Purdie agreed a new deal in June 2016 to play for Hereford in the Southern Football League South and West. At the end of the 2017–18 season, Purdie retired from football after scoring in his final appearance.

== Honours ==
Hereford United

- Conference play-off final winner: 2005–06

Hereford

- Midland Football League Premier Division: 2015–2016
- Midland Football League League Cup: 2015–2016
- FA Vase: 2015–16 Runner-up
- Herefordshire FA County Cup: 2015–2016, 2016–17
- Southern Football League South & West: 2016–17
- Southern Football League Premier Division: 2017–18

== Career statistics ==
=== Managerial statistics ===
Competitive matches only – Correct as of 23 September 2014.

| Team | From | To | Record | | | | | | |
| Team | From | To | P | W | D | L | GF | GA | Win % |
|---|---|---|---|---|---|---|---|---|---|
| Tamworth (caretaker) | 16 September 2014 | 23 September 2014 | 1 | 0 | 1 | 0 | 1 | 1 | 0.00 |
| Total | | | 1 | 0 | 1 | 0 | 1 | 1 | 0.00 |
