= Xavier Barrau =

French footballer (born 1982)

Personal information
- Full name: Xavier Barrau
- Date of birth: 26 September 1982 (age 44)
- Place of birth: Lyon, France
- Height: 5 ft 10 in (1.78 m)
- Position: Midfielder

Youth career
- Lyon

Senior career*
Years	Team	Apps	(Gls)
1999–2000	Louhans-Cuiseaux	0	(0)
2000–2002	Walsall	0	(0)
2002–2003	Viry-Châtillon		
2003–2004	La Roche		
2004–2006	Meyrin	48	(4)
2006	Airdrie United	13	(2)
2007	Gretna	1	(1)
2007	Bradford City	3	(2)
2007	Darlington	1	(0)
2008	Hamilton Academical	4	(0)
2008–2012	ES Fréjus	47	(4)
- * Club domestic league appearances and goals as of 20:08, 5 December 2009 (UTC)

Xavier 'Xavi' Barrau (born 26 September 1982) is a French former professional footballer.

== Career ==
He formerly played for Louhans-Cuiseaux, Viry-Châtillon and La Roche in France, Bradford City, Darlington and Walsall in England, Meyrin in Switzerland and Airdrie United and Gretna in Scotland.

At Bradford City, he made two substitute appearances, before making his first start in the final game of the season, scoring twice.

Barrau signed for Hamilton Academcial (another club in Scotland) on 1 January 2008 on a six-month contract. However, he was released in April 2008 to return to France. He left Hamilton after his then-wife complained of feeling homesick.

At the beginning of the 2008–09 season, Barrau signed for French club ES Fréjus who play in CFA Group B.

As of January 2015, Barrau was running a chauffeuring business in the south of France.
