= Tim Ryan (footballer) =

English footballer

Personal information
- Full name: Timothy James Ryan
- Date of birth: 10 December 1974 (age 51)
- Place of birth: Stockport, England
- Height: 5 ft 10 in (1.78 m)
- Position: Left-back

Team information
- Current team: York City (youth-team manager)

Senior career*
Years	Team	Apps	(Gls)
1995–1996	Scunthorpe United	0	(0)
1996	Buxton	?	(?)
1996–1997	Doncaster Rovers	27	(0)
1997	→ Altrincham (loan)	?	(?)
1997–2000	Southport	114	(2)
2000–2006	Doncaster Rovers	181	(6)
2006	Peterborough United	7	(0)
2006–2007	Boston United	23	(4)
2007–2009	Darlington	41	(1)
2008	→ Harrogate Town (loan)	?	(?)
2009–2010	Chester City	x	(x)
2010–2013	Stalybridge Celtic	25	(3)
2013	Bradford Park Avenue	10	(0)
2013–	Buxton		

International career
?	England C		

Managerial career
- 2009: Chester City (caretaker)
- 2022: York City (caretaker)
- * Club domestic league appearances and goals

Timothy James Ryan (born 10 December 1974) is an English former professional footballer. On 14 November 2018 he was appointed York City Youth Team Manager.

== Playing career ==
Ryan joined Darlington in January 2007 signing from Boston United. He has also played for Doncaster, Southport, Scunthorpe, Boston United and Darlington ahead of his transfer to Chester in July 2009.

In September 2009 Ryan was appointed as caretaker-manager of Chester. After taking charge of a goalless draw at Hayes & Yeading, Ryan became assistant manager to new boss Jim Harvey.

After the winding up of Chester City in February 2010 following their expulsion from the Conference, he joined Stalybridge Celtic in March 2010 alongside his former manager at Chester, Jim Harvey In 2013, he rejoined Buxton as the club's Player/Assistant Manager.

== Coaching and managerial career ==
Ryan had spells as assistant manager at Stalybridge Celtic and Chester City. He was also the assistant-manager at Northern Premier League Premier Division side Buxton for five years until leaving his post in April 2018. In 2013 Ryan was appointed co-ordinator for the Doncaster Rovers academy at the Club Doncaster Sports College.

On 14 November 2018, Ryan was appointed York City youth-team manager.

On 17 November 2022, Ryan was appointed York City caretaker manager after John Askey was sacked.

== International career ==
Ryan is a former England semi-professional international.

== Honours ==
=== As a player ===
Southport

- Lancashire Junior Cup: 1996–97, 1997–98
- Liverpool Senior Cup: 1999

Doncaster Rovers

- Football League Third Division: 2003–04
- Conference National play-offs: 2003
