= Clark Keltie =

English footballer (born 1983)

Personal information
- Full name: Clark Stuart Keltie
- Date of birth: 31 August 1983 (age 43)
- Place of birth: Newcastle upon Tyne, England
- Height: 6 ft 1 in (1.85 m)
- Position: Midfielder

Team information
- Current team: Floreat Athena
- Number: 6

Youth career
- 2000–2001: Walker Central
- 2001: Sunderland

Senior career*
Years	Team	Apps	(Gls)
2001–2008	Darlington	240	(11)
2008–2009	Rochdale	34	(1)
2009	→ Chester City (loan)	0	(0)
2009	→ Gateshead (loan)	3	(0)
2010–2011	Lincoln City	35	(0)
2011–2012	Þór Akureyri	13	(1)
2012	Cork City	0	(0)
2012	Darlington	15	(0)
2012	Víkingur Ólafsvík	13	(0)
2012	Darlington	9	(0)
2013–2017	Perth SC	59	(7)
2018	Bayswater City	0	(0)
2019	Gwelup Croatia		
2020	Sorrento FC	11	(1)
2023–	Floreat Athena		
- * Club domestic league appearances and goals as of 07:57, 19 November 2024 (UTC)

Clark Stuart Keltie (born 31 August 1983) is an English professional footballer who plays as a midfielder for Floreat Athena FC.

He has notably played in the Football League for Darlington, Rochdale and Lincoln City, and in the Icelandic Premier League for Þór Akureyri and 1. deild karla for Víkingur Ólafsvík. He has also been contracted to League of Ireland side Cork City and has appeared back at non-League level for Chester City, Gateshead and Darlington.

== Career ==
Keltie started his career as a youngster with Walker Central before joining Sunderland on a trial period. After two games he was offered a one-year deal with the Premier League side but decided on giving his services to Darlington on a three-year contract in September 2001. Keltie made his debut at the age of 18 in the final game of the 2001–02 season at Oxford United.

The following season Keltie went from strength to strength, becoming the youngest captain in the club's history, in the absence of regular captain Craig Liddle. A cruciate knee ligament injury sustained in training in late January 2005 saw Keltie sidelined for six months. He spent eight years with Darlington until he was released by manager Dave Penney in May 2008 for financial reasons. He had made a total of 179 appearances for the Quakers, scoring 11 goals.

He moved to fellow League Two club Rochdale. Ending the season in the League Two semi-final play-offs, losing out to Gillingham in the second leg. In his second season with Rochdale, Keltie was loaned to Chester City and Gateshead. He had his contracted with Rochdale terminated by mutual consent on 24 December 2009. He trained with former club Darlington and had agreed to re-join them in January 2010 on a six-month deal, but instead moved to Lincoln City.

Initially, Keltie's contract at Lincoln City was until the end of the season. However, he impressed sufficiently to be offered another year. Playing a key role in the club's survival in League Two.

Keltie signed with Icelandic side Þór Akureyri on 21 July 2011 after leaving Lincoln City, on a deal lasting through the end of the Icelandic season. The club reached the Icelandic national cup final only to finish runner-up to champions KR Reykjavik.

Keltie signed with League of Ireland Premier Division side Cork City in January 2012. After trialling with the club during the summer of 2011, Keltie said on his arrival that he was grateful that Tommy Dunne had given him a second opportunity to sign for the club. The player and club mutually agreed to terminate his contract for personal reasons on 22 January, and Keltie then returned to Darlington on a non-contract basis.

Keltie moved to Iceland again in May 2012 for a short period of time, this time to Víkingur Ólafsvík. The team went on to finish second place, gaining promotion to the Premier League for part of the season.

He returned to England, joining Darlington, but was released by the club after a short period in December 2012.
