= Przemysław Kazimierczak =

Polish footballer

Personal information
- Date of birth: 22 February 1988 (age 38)
- Place of birth: Łódź, Poland
- Height: 1.91 m (6 ft 3 in)
- Position: Goalkeeper

Team information
- Current team: Zawisza Rzgów
- Number: 12

Youth career
- ŁKS Łódź

Senior career*
Years	Team	Apps	(Gls)
2004–2008	Bolton Wanderers	0	(0)
2007	→ Accrington Stanley (loan)	8	(0)
2007	→ Wycombe Wanderers (loan)	0	(0)
2008–2009	Darlington	9	(0)
2008–2009	→ Whitby Town (loan)	2	(0)
2009	Oldham Athletic	0	(0)
2010–2011	Flota Świnoujście	1	(0)
2011–2012	Orzeł Ząbkowice Śląskie	5	(0)
2012–2013	KS Polkowice	21	(0)
2014	Jarota Jarocin	7	(0)
2015–2016	Polonia Warsaw	31	(0)
2016–2018	ŁKS Łódź	2	(0)
2018–2019	Warta Sieradz	32	(0)
2019–	Zawisza Rzgów	92	(0)
- * Club domestic league appearances and goals as of 15 July 2024

Przemysław Kazimierczak (Polish pronunciation: [pʂɛˈmɨswaf kaʑiˈmʲɛrtʂak]; born 22 February 1988) is a Polish professional footballer who plays as a goalkeeper for Zawisza Rzgów.

== Club career ==
Kazimierczak began playing football at ŁKS Łódź's youth academy. In 2004, he joined Bolton Wanderers' academy. During the 2006–07 season he spent two months on loan at Accrington Stanley and played eight games before returning to Bolton. On 28 September 2007 he joined Wycombe Wanderers on a one-month loan.

On 31 January 2008 he joined Darlington on a free transfer signing an eighteen-month contract. He made his debut for Darlington on 3 May 2008, impressing with a clean sheet against already-promoted Peterborough United.

The first half of the 2008–09 season saw first team chances limited for Kazimierczak. Two appearances in the Football League Trophy were the only first team starts he made before December 2008. Ten days before Christmas he joined Whitby Town on loan.

On 28 March 2009 he replaced the injured Andy Oakes in the 79th minute of Darlington's match versus Barnet F.C. Due to Oakes' injury, Kazimierczak played in the remaining games of the season.

On 6 August 2009 he joined Oldham Athletic on a short-term contract.

On 8 August 2018, Kazimierczak joined Warta Sieradz. One year later, he signed with Zawisza Rzgów.

== Honours ==
Polonia Warsaw

- III liga Łódź–Masovian: 2015–16

Zawisza Rzgów

- Regional league Piotrków Trybunalski: 2023–24
