= The Darlington Arena =

Rugby union stadium in Darlington, England

Coordinates: 54°30′30″N 1°32′4″W

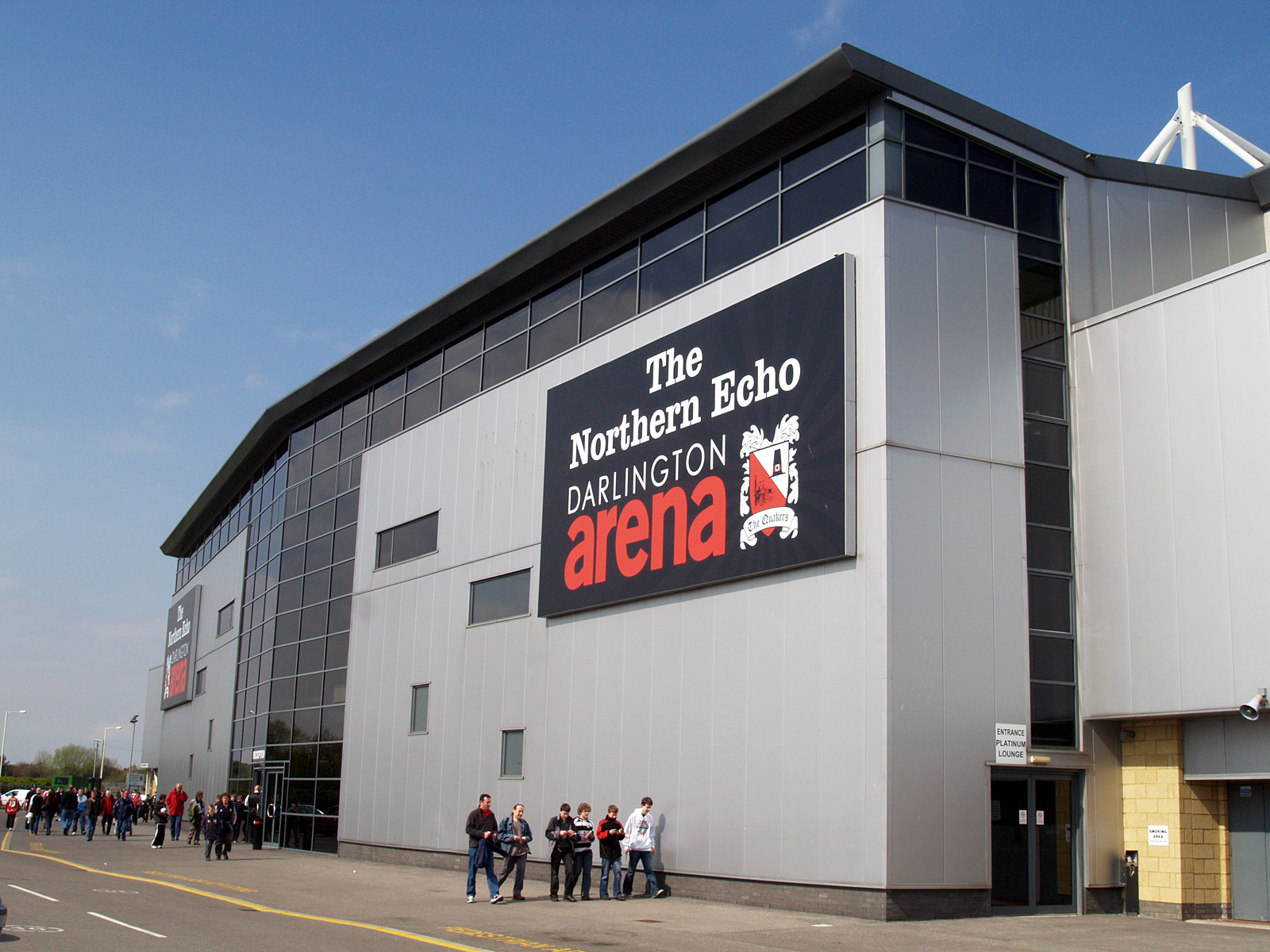
- The arena as pictured in 2009
- Interactive map of The Darlington Arena
- Location: Darlington, England
- Owner: Darlington Mowden Park
- Capacity: 25,500
- Surface: Grass
- Field size: 110 by 74 yards (101 m × 68 m)

Construction
- Opened: 2003
- Cost: £18 million

Tenants
- Darlington F.C. (2003–2012); Darlington Mowden Park R.F.C. (2012–)

The Darlington Arena is a rugby union stadium, located in Darlington, County Durham.

The arena was opened in the summer of 2003, as the new home ground of Darlington F.C., following the decision to leave their previous ground, Feethams, after the 2002–03 season. With a seating capacity of 25,000, the arena rarely attracted large crowds, with the usual attendance being around 2,000. The cost of the arena caused the club to go into administration three times. Eventually, the club decided to leave the arena after nine years following the 2011–12 season.

In December 2012, after rumours that the arena could be closed down, rugby union team Darlington Mowden Park RFC purchased the arena for £2 million. The owner of the club later stated that he believed that the arena could lead to much more success for the club.

== History ==
Prior to moving to the ground in 2003, Darlington F.C. had been playing at Feethams, located near to the town centre. The current stadium was built on a greenfield site next to Darlington's A66 bypass. Upon completion the arena was originally called the Reynolds Arena, after the club's then owner, George Reynolds. However, Reynolds was declared bankrupt soon afterwards and arrested on charges of money laundering. As a result of this, the stadium's name was changed to the New Stadium in April 2004.

The Arena consists of four equally sided stands. The West Stand, located behind the goal, was generally the more vocal of the two sides used by home supporters.

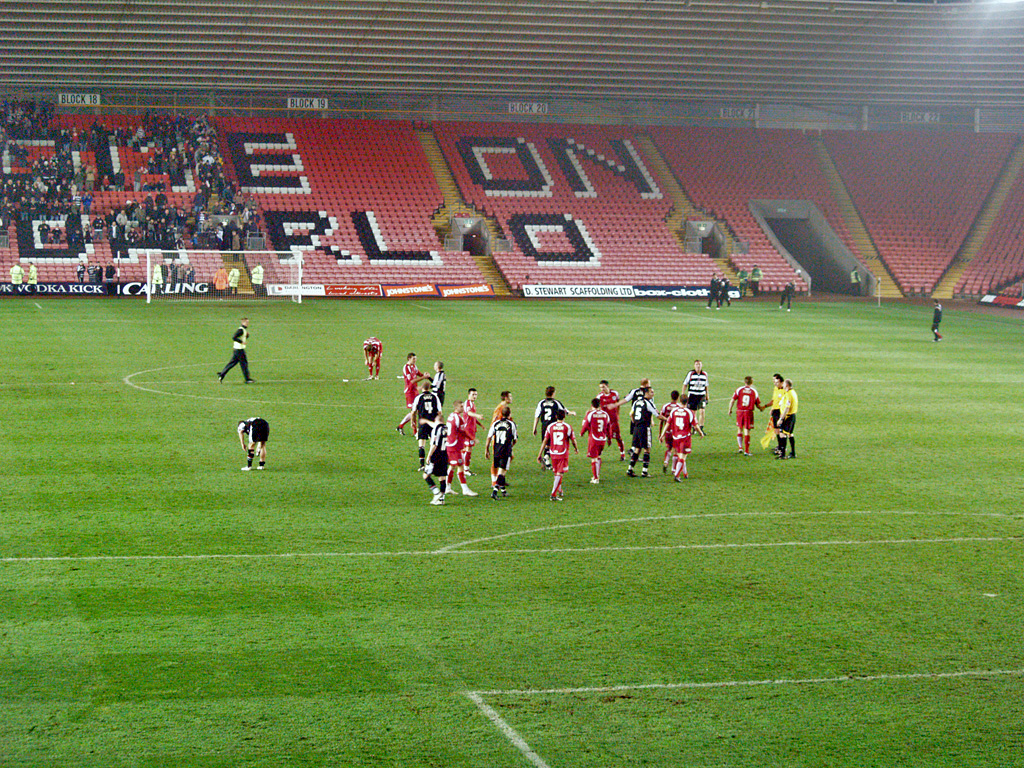
Ground showing the words "Come on Darlo"

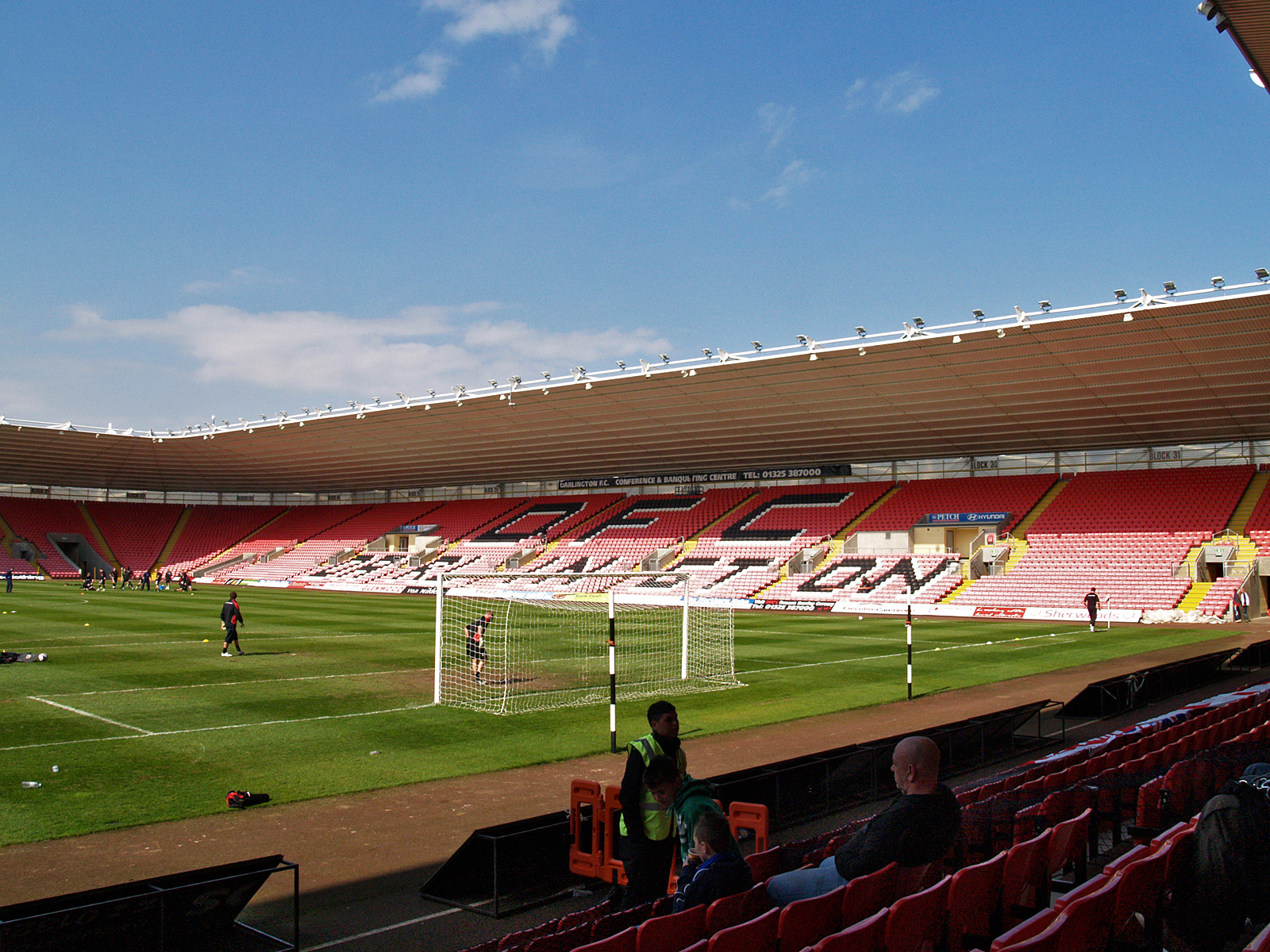
The arena in April 2009

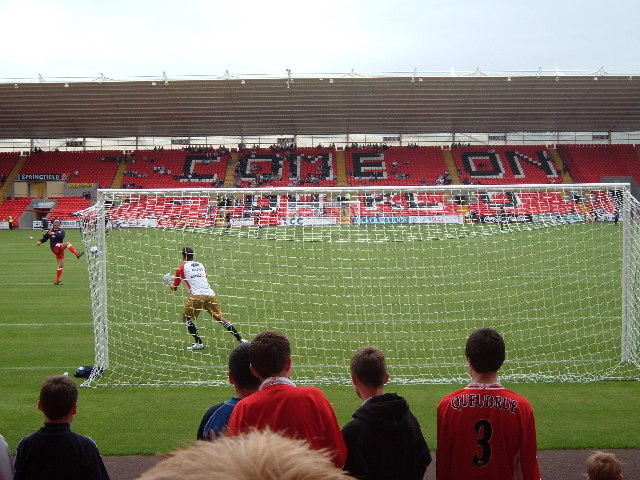

A crowd of 11,600 watched the first game in the new stadium for a 2–0 defeat to Kidderminster Harriers. Since then, the ground averaged a gate of around 1,500 to 2,000 supporters, although certain fixtures such as the derby match defeat against local rivals Hartlepool United in March 2007 (9,987 spectators), pulled in a significantly larger turnout.

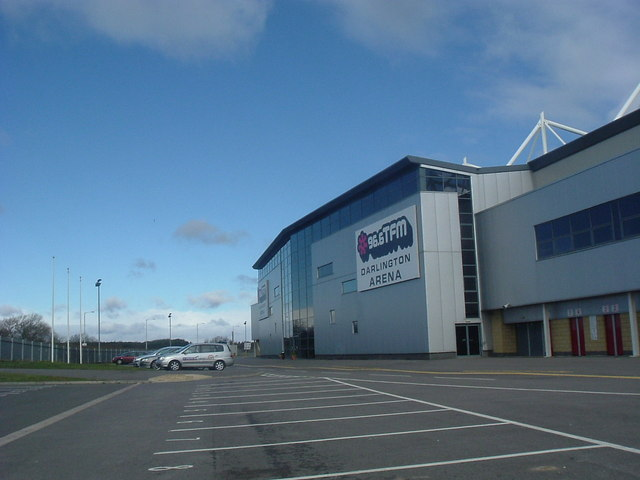
The stadium with, former logo of 96.6 TFM, branding on side

The club has sold the naming rights for the stadium to various sponsors: Williamson Motors, 96.6 TFM, Balfour Webnet, and in 2009 The Northern Echo; since Darlington Mowden Park RFC have used the arena, it has been named The Northern Echo Arena, rather than the previous name The Northern Echo Darlington Arena.

It was the largest Conference National venue with a capacity of 25,000. Attendances for football matches were restricted to 10,000 by local planning regulations, because of poor access roads around the stadium, although the club was allowed to apply for an exception for special occasions – namely cup ties against bigger clubs.

It was announced in May 2012 that Darlington would no longer play at the Darlington Arena. The club initially agreed a ground share deal with Shildon A.F.C., before deciding to share with Bishop Auckland F.C. instead.

Following the announcement that the football club would no longer play at the arena, it was reported that the arena may be closed down and be replaced by a housing estate. However, in December 2012, Darlington Mowden Park R.F.C. bought the arena for £2 million, as well as 17 acres (6.9 ha) of adjoining land, with the intention of developing a multi-sports facility; the club owner stated that he hoped that playing at the arena would improve Mowden Park's performances. This would be proved to be true, as they were promoted to National League 1, the third tier of English rugby union, beginning in the 2014–15 season.

The club played their first game at the arena on 2 February 2013, in front of a crowd of over 1,000 spectators, defeating Bromsgrove 62–7 in a National League 2 North league game. Regular attendances would bring in around 700–1,300 spectators.

=== Tees Valley Metro ===
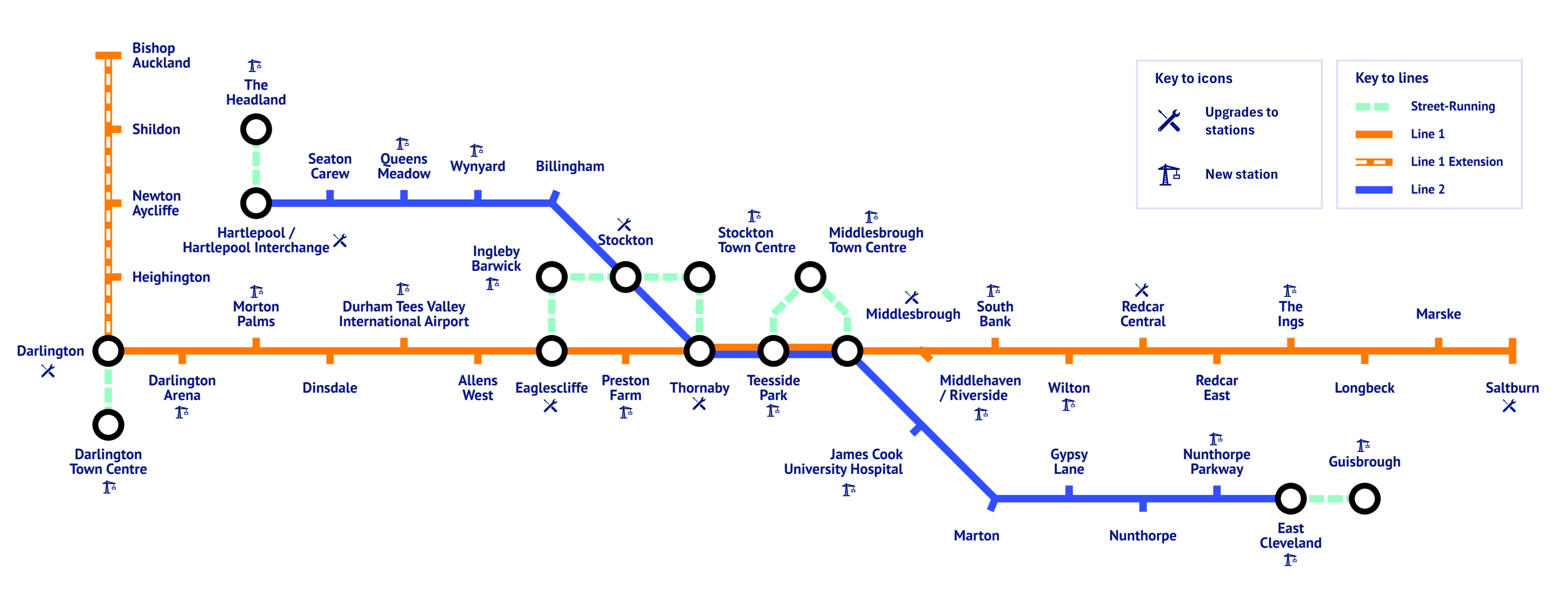
Transit diagram showcasing all discussed or mentioned ideas for the Tees Valley Metro.

Starting in 2006, Darlington Arena was mentioned within the Tees Valley Metro scheme as a new possible station site. This was a plan to upgrade the Tees Valley Line and sections of the Esk Valley Line and Durham Coast Line to provide a faster and more frequent service across the North East of England. In the initial phases the services would have been heavy rail mostly along existing alignments with new additional infrastructure and rollingstock. The later phase would have introduced tram-trains to allow street running and further heavy rail extensions.

As part of the scheme, Darlington Arena station would have received service to Darlington and Saltburn (1–2 to 4 trains per hour) and new rollingstock. While never concrete or mentioned in any detailed plans, there was also mention of street-running trams to Darlington town centre, which may have also operated in the vicinity of the Arena.

However, due to a change in government in 2010 and the 2008 financial crisis, the project was ultimately shelved. Several stations eventually got their improvements and several new stations like James Cook railway station were constructed.

== Other uses ==
The Arena also played host to the first professional rugby league match to be played in County Durham, when Gateshead Thunder used the ground for their fifth round 2009 Challenge Cup game against Oldham due to a fixture clash.

=== Concerts ===
Darlington planned to use the stadium for musical concerts to increase club revenue. Elton John was the first act to play at the stadium, on 5 July 2008, attracting a crowd of 17,000.

In 2018 Steps and A-ha performed at the arena, followed in 2019 by Jess Glynne.

| Act | Warm-up acts | Date(s) | Attendance | Sources |
|---|---|---|---|---|
| Elton John | Richard Fleeshman | 5 July 2008 | 17,000 | |
| UB40 | Level 42, Raging Fyah | 28 May 2017 | unconfirmed | |
| Steps | Blue, Björn Again | 27 May 2018 | unconfirmed | |
| a-ha | Tom Bailey, Orchestral Manoeuvres in the Dark | 17 June 2018 | 5,000+ | |
| Jess Glynne | Germein, Nina Nesbitt | 2 August 2019 | unconfirmed | |
| Olly Murs | Katie Kittermaster, Sophie Ellis-Bextor | 28 August 2021 | unconfirmed | |
| Tom Jones | The Dunwells, Chris Simmons, Megan McKenna | 29 August 2021 | unconfirmed | |
| Simply Red | Gabrielle | 13 August 2022 | unconfirmed | |
| James | Pale Blue Eyes, The Kairos, The Pigeon Detectives, Editors, Maxïmo Park | 5 August 2023 | unconfirmed | |
| Razorlight^{a} | Ocean Colour Scene, Jake Bugg, White Lies, Tom A. Smith, Cammy Barnes, Pastel, Matt-Felix | 23 August 2025 | unconfirmed | |
| The Human League^{b} | T'Pau, Altered Images, Toyah, The Farm, The Christians, Tony Hadley, Bananarama | 24 August 2025 | unconfirmed | |
| Foo Fighters | St Vincent, Florence Road | 14 September 2027 | unconfirmed | |

^{a} As part of Touchdown Festival

^{b} As part of '80s Calling' festival

=== Vaccinations ===
During the COVID-19 pandemic, the arena was used as a large vaccination centre. It was able to vaccinate up to 7,700 people per week.
