= Dave Penney =

English football player and manager (born 1964)

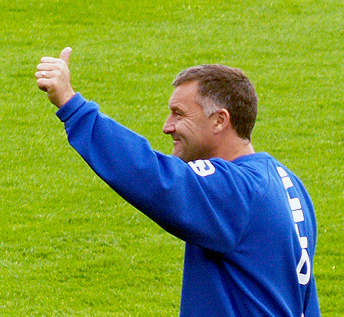
- Penney in 2009

Personal information
- Full name: David Mark Penney
- Date of birth: 17 August 1964 (age 62)
- Place of birth: Wakefield, West Riding of Yorkshire, England
- Height: 5 ft 10 in (1.78 m)

Senior career*
Years	Team	Apps	(Gls)
1984–1985	Pontefract Collieries	?	(?)
1985–1989	Derby County	19	(0)
1989–1994	Oxford United	110	(15)
1991	→ Swansea City (loan)	12	(3)
1994–1997	Swansea City	116	(20)
1997–1998	Cardiff City	35	(5)
1998–2002	Doncaster Rovers	63	(13)
Total		355	(56)

Managerial career
- 2000: Doncaster Rovers (player)
- 2001–2006: Doncaster Rovers
- 2006–2009: Darlington
- 2009–2010: Oldham Athletic
- 2011: Bristol Rovers
- 2013–2015: Southend United (assistant)
- 2016–2017: Guiseley (assistant)
- * Club domestic league appearances and goals

David Mark Penney (born 17 August 1964) is an English football manager and former player. Born in Wakefield, West Riding of Yorkshire, Penney entered professional football at the relatively late age of 21. He had been working as a bricklayer and playing for nothing at Pontefract Collieries for five years before he was spotted by Derby County scout Ron Jukes, who recommended him to manager Arthur Cox. He was offered a contract at the then Third Division club and they climbed two divisions before he left for Oxford United for £175,000. He then went on to Wales, where he played for Swansea City and Cardiff City, latterly signing for Doncaster Rovers in 1998. He played as a midfielder.

== Managerial career ==
In 2002 Penney retired to pursue a career in management and he remained at Doncaster, taking the managerial job on a full-time basis. After a well-placed finish in his first season, Penney guided Doncaster back into the Football League with victory in the 2003 play-off final. Their stay in Division Three wasn't long though as he managed Doncaster to the Division Three title. During a further two seasons of cementing Doncaster's place in League One Penney famously masterminded victories over Premier League sides Manchester City and Aston Villa, and nearly overcame Arsenal in the League Cup quarter-finals before finally being beaten in a penalty shootout. Penney left Rovers on 30 August 2006 as he felt he had taken the club as far as he could.

He was appointed manager of Darlington on 30 October 2006. He returned to Doncaster with Darlington for a Football League Trophy tie on 9 January 2007, Doncaster winning the game 2–0, and Penney received a hero's reception from the home fans at the new Keepmoat Stadium.

Penney was appointed manager at Oldham Athletic on 30 April 2009. He left on 6 May 2010, through mutual consent, with falling attendances one of the reasons why Penney was relieved of duty.

On 10 January 2011, Penney was appointed as manager of League One club Bristol Rovers. His tenure in charge of the west country club did not last long however, as he was sacked less than two months later having lost nine of his 13 games in charge. His last game was a 2–0 defeat against Dagenham and Redbridge. Following receiving the sack from Bristol Rovers, Stuart Campbell was put in charge for the game against Tranmere, in which a Chris Lines goal sealed a 1–0 win.

While at the Memorial Stadium, he only recorded two wins, against Swindon Town and Oldham Athletic, and also recorded a 6–1 defeat away to Walsall. He was reported as being furious after being overlooked for the Grimsby Town managerial job when Rob Scott and Paul Hurst were appointed on 22 March 2011.

He was then hired as an assistant coach at Southend United, leaving the position in June 2015. In September 2016, Penney was once again hired as an assistant manager, this time for Guiseley. Together with manager Adam Lockwood, Penney was fired on 30 August 2017.

On 1 October 2017, York City hired Penney as a sporting director.

On 11 August 2022, York City announced that Penney had left the club by mutual consent with immediate effect.

== Managerial statistics ==
As of 5 March 2011

Team	From	To	Matches	Won	Drawn	Lost	Win %
Doncaster Rovers	22 April 2000	31 May 2000	6	4	1	1	66.7
Doncaster Rovers	27 December 2001	30 August 2006	241	114	62	65	47.3
Darlington	30 October 2006	30 April 2009	139	60	35	44	43.2
Oldham Athletic	30 April 2009	6 May 2010	48	13	13	22	27.1
Bristol Rovers	10 January 2011	7 March 2011	13	2	2	9	15.38

== Honours ==
=== As a player ===
Derby County

- Football League Second Division: 1986–87

Swansea City

- Welsh Cup: 1991
- West Wales Senior Cup: 1991, 1995

Cardiff City

- FAW Invitation Cup runner-up: 1998

=== As a manager ===
Doncaster Rovers

- Football League Third Division: 2003–04
- Football Conference play-offs: 2003

Individual

- Football Conference Manager of the Month: August 2002, October 2002
- Football League One Manager of the Month: November 2005
