= 2009–10 Rochdale A.F.C. season =

English football club season

Rochdale A.F.C.
2009–10 season
- Chairman: Chris Dunphy
- Stadium: Spotland Stadium
- League Two: 3rd (promoted)
- FA Cup: First round
- League Cup: First round
- League Trophy: First round
- Top goalscorer: League: Chris O'Grady (22 goals); All: Chris O'Grady (22 goals)
| Home colours | Away colours | Third colours |

The 2009–10 season was Rochdale A.F.C.'s 103rd in existence and their 36th consecutive in the fourth tier of the English football league (League Two). Rochdale finished the season in 3rd place in League Two and won automatic promotion to League One, ending a period of 36 years in the fourth tier.

== League table ==
| Pos | Team | Pld | W | D | L | GF | GA | GD | Pts | Promotion, qualification or relegation |
|---|---|---|---|---|---|---|---|---|---|---|
| 1 | Notts County (C, P) | 46 | 27 | 12 | 7 | 96 | 31 | +65 | 93 | Promotion to Football League One |
| 2 | Bournemouth (P) | 46 | 25 | 8 | 13 | 61 | 44 | +17 | 83 | Promotion to Football League One |
| 3 | Rochdale (P) | 46 | 25 | 7 | 14 | 82 | 48 | +34 | 82 | Promotion to Football League One |
| 4 | Morecambe | 46 | 20 | 13 | 13 | 73 | 64 | +9 | 73 | Qualification to League Two play-offs |
| 5 | Rotherham United | 46 | 21 | 10 | 15 | 55 | 52 | +3 | 73 | Qualification to League Two play-offs |

Updated to match(es) played on unknown. Source: football-league.co.uk
(C) Champions; (P) Promoted

== Statistics ==
| No. | Pos | Nat | Player | Total | | League Two | | FA Cup | | League Cup | | League Trophy | |
| No. | Pos | Nat | Player | Apps | Goals | Apps | Goals | Apps | Goals | Apps | Goals | Apps | Goals |
|---|---|---|---|---|---|---|---|---|---|---|---|---|---|
| 1 | GK | (Scotland) SCO | Kenny Arthur | 18 | 0 | 15 + 0 | 0 | 1 + 0 | 0 | 1 + 0 | 0 | 1 + 0 | 0 |
| 2 | DF | (Gibraltar) GIB | Scott Wiseman | 37 | 1 | 33 + 3 | 1 | 0 + 0 | 0 | 0 + 0 | 0 | 0 + 1 | 0 |
| 3 | DF | (England) ENG | Tom Kennedy | 48 | 3 | 44 + 0 | 3 | 2 + 0 | 0 | 1 + 0 | 0 | 1 + 0 | 0 |
| 4 | DF | (England) ENG | Nathan Stanton | 39 | 0 | 37 + 1 | 0 | 0 + 0 | 0 | 1 + 0 | 0 | 0 + 0 | 0 |
| 5 | MF | (England) ENG | Clark Keltie | 0 | 0 | 0 + 0 | 0 | 0 + 0 | 0 | 0 + 0 | 0 | 0 + 0 | 0 |
| 6 | MF | (Northern Ireland) NIR | Ciarán Toner | 13 | 0 | 7 + 6 | 0 | 0 + 0 | 0 | 0 + 0 | 0 | 0 + 0 | 0 |
| 7 | MF | (England) ENG | Jason Kennedy | 46 | 0 | 40 + 2 | 0 | 2 + 0 | 0 | 1 + 0 | 0 | 1 + 0 | 0 |
| 8 | MF | (England) ENG | Gary Jones | 37 | 4 | 32 + 2 | 4 | 2 + 0 | 0 | 1 + 0 | 0 | 0 + 0 | 0 |
| 9 | FW | (England) ENG | Chris Dagnall | 49 | 20 | 45 + 0 | 20 | 2 + 0 | 0 | 1 + 0 | 0 | 1 + 0 | 0 |
| 10 | MF | (England) ENG | Andy Haworth | 7 | 0 | 3 + 4 | 0 | 0 + 0 | 0 | 0 + 0 | 0 | 0 + 0 | 0 |
| 10 | FW | (England) ENG | Adam Le Fondre | 1 | 0 | 0 + 1 | 0 | 0 + 0 | 0 | 0 + 0 | 0 | 0 + 0 | 0 |
| 10 | FW | (England) ENG | Scott Spencer | 5 | 0 | 0 + 4 | 0 | 0 + 0 | 0 | 0 + 0 | 0 | 0 + 1 | 0 |
| 11 | DF | (England) ENG | Michael Lea | 0 | 0 | 0 + 0 | 0 | 0 + 0 | 0 | 0 + 0 | 0 | 0 + 0 | 0 |
| 11 | MF | (England) ENG | Adam Rundle | 16 | 1 | 6 + 6 | 1 | 2 + 0 | 0 | 1 + 0 | 0 | 1 + 0 | 0 |
| 12 | FW | (England) ENG | Danny Glover | 2 | 0 | 0 + 2 | 0 | 0 + 0 | 0 | 0 + 0 | 0 | 0 + 0 | 0 |
| 12 | MF | (England) ENG | Dale Stephens | 6 | 1 | 3 + 3 | 1 | 0 + 0 | 0 | 0 + 0 | 0 | 0 + 0 | 0 |
| 13 | GK | (England) ENG | Danny Taberner | 1 | 0 | 0 + 0 | 0 | 1 + 0 | 0 | 0 + 0 | 0 | 0 + 0 | 0 |
| 14 | MF | (England) ENG | Tope Obadeyi | 11 | 1 | 5 + 6 | 1 | 0 + 0 | 0 | 0 + 0 | 0 | 0 + 0 | 0 |
| 14 | MF | (England) ENG | Simon Whaley | 9 | 2 | 8 + 1 | 2 | 0 + 0 | 0 | 0 + 0 | 0 | 0 + 0 | 0 |
| 15 | MF | (England) ENG | Joe Thompson | 40 | 8 | 27 + 9 | 6 | 2 + 0 | 2 | 1 + 0 | 0 | 1 + 0 | 0 |
| 16 | FW | (Cameroon) CMR | Marcus Magna | 3 | 0 | 0 + 2 | 0 | 0 + 1 | 0 | 0 + 0 | 0 | 0 + 0 | 0 |
| 17 | MF | (England) ENG | Jon Shaw | 2 | 0 | 0 + 1 | 0 | 0 + 0 | 0 | 0 + 1 | 0 | 0 + 0 | 0 |
| 18 | FW | (England) ENG | Kallum Higginbotham | 32 | 3 | 6 + 23 | 3 | 0 + 2 | 0 | 0 + 1 | 0 | 0 + 0 | 0 |
| 19 | FW | (England) ENG | Chris O'Grady | 45 | 22 | 43 + 0 | 22 | 2 + 0 | 0 | 0 + 0 | 0 | 0 + 0 | 0 |
| 21 | GK | (Scotland) SCO | Matty Edwards | 0 | 0 | 0 + 0 | 0 | 0 + 0 | 0 | 0 + 0 | 0 | 0 + 0 | 0 |
| 22 | MF | (England) ENG | David Flitcroft | 1 | 0 | 0 + 0 | 0 | 0 + 0 | 0 | 0 + 0 | 0 | 1 + 0 | 0 |
| 23 | DF | (Northern Ireland) NIR | Rory McArdle | 22 | 0 | 17 + 3 | 0 | 2 + 0 | 0 | 0 + 0 | 0 | 0 + 0 | 0 |
| 24 | DF | (England) ENG | Chris Brown | 1 | 0 | 0 + 0 | 0 | 0 + 0 | 0 | 0 + 0 | 0 | 0 + 1 | 0 |
| 25 | MF | (England) ENG | Callum Byrne | 0 | 0 | 0 + 0 | 0 | 0 + 0 | 0 | 0 + 0 | 0 | 0 + 0 | 0 |
| 26 | DF | (England) ENG | Craig Dawson | 46 | 11 | 40 + 2 | 9 | 2 + 0 | 1 | 1 + 0 | 0 | 1 + 0 | 1 |
| 27 | DF | (England) ENG | Josh Brizell | 1 | 0 | 0 + 0 | 0 | 0 + 0 | 0 | 0 + 1 | 0 | 0 + 0 | 0 |
| 28 | DF | (England) ENG | Matthew Flynn | 11 | 0 | 7 + 3 | 0 | 0 + 0 | 0 | 0 + 0 | 0 | 1 + 0 | 0 |
| 29 | GK | (England) ENG | Josh Lillis | 1 | 0 | 1 + 0 | 0 | 0 + 0 | 0 | 0 + 0 | 0 | 0 + 0 | 0 |
| 30 | MF | (England) ENG | Will Buckley | 18 | 3 | 12 + 3 | 3 | 0 + 1 | 0 | 1 + 0 | 0 | 1 + 0 | 0 |
| 31 | DF | (England) ENG | Marcus Holness | 15 | 0 | 7 + 4 | 0 | 2 + 0 | 0 | 1 + 0 | 0 | 1 + 0 | 0 |
| 32 | MF | (England) ENG | Will Atkinson | 15 | 3 | 15 + 0 | 3 | 0 + 0 | 0 | 0 + 0 | 0 | 0 + 0 | 0 |
| 33 | GK | (England) ENG | Frank Fielding | 18 | 0 | 18 + 0 | 0 | 0 + 0 | 0 | 0 + 0 | 0 | 0 + 0 | 0 |
| 33 | MF | (England) ENG | Jason Taylor | 23 | 1 | 23 + 0 | 1 | 0 + 0 | 0 | 0 + 0 | 0 | 0 + 0 | 0 |
| 34 | GK | (England) ENG | Jordan Andrews | 0 | 0 | 0 + 0 | 0 | 0 + 0 | 0 | 0 + 0 | 0 | 0 + 0 | 0 |
| 34 | FW | (England) ENG | Scott Hogan | 0 | 0 | 0 + 0 | 0 | 0 + 0 | 0 | 0 + 0 | 0 | 0 + 0 | 0 |
| 36 | MF | (England) ENG | Reece Gray | 2 | 0 | 0 + 2 | 0 | 0 + 0 | 0 | 0 + 0 | 0 | 0 + 0 | 0 |
| 38 | GK | (England) ENG | Tom Heaton | 12 | 0 | 12 + 0 | 0 | 0 + 0 | 0 | 0 + 0 | 0 | 0 + 0 | 0 |
| | FW | (England) ENG | Denis Sheriff | 0 | 0 | 0 + 0 | 0 | 0 + 0 | 0 | 0 + 0 | 0 | 0 + 0 | 0 |
| | DF | (England) ENG | George Bowyer | 0 | 0 | 0 + 0 | 0 | 0 + 0 | 0 | 0 + 0 | 0 | 0 + 0 | 0 |

== Results ==
=== Pre-season Friendlies ===
| 15 July 2009 | Radcliffe Borough | 0–1 | Rochdale | Radcliffe |
| | | Report | | Stadium: Stainton Park |

| 18 July 2009 | Rochdale | 1–4 | Everton | Rochdale |
| 15:00 BST | | Report | | Stadium: Spotland Stadium |

| 25 July 2009 | Rochdale | 1–1 | Blackpool | Rochdale |
| | | Report | | Stadium: Spotland Stadium |

=== League Two ===
| 8 August 2009 1 | Port Vale | 1–1 | Rochdale | Stoke-on-Trent |
| 15:00 BST | Richards 75' (pen.) | Report | Thompson 66' | Stadium: Vale Park; Attendance: 6,158; Referee: Jock Waugh |

| 15 August 2009 2 | Rochdale | 1–0 | Aldershot Town | Rochdale |
| 15:00 BST | Stanton (red card) 16'; Kennedy 90' (pen.) | Report | Halls (yellow card) 70' | Stadium: Spotland Stadium; Attendance: 2,465; Referee: Phil Gibbs |

| 18 August 2009 3 | Rochdale | 0–1 | Cheltenham Town | Rochdale |
| 19:45 BST | | Report | Diallo (yellow card) 89'; Alsop 90' | Stadium: Spotland Stadium; Attendance: 2,311; Referee: Andy Haines |

| 23 August 2009 4 | Rotherham United | 2–1 | Rochdale | Rotherham |
| 15:00 BST | Le Fondre 43'; Warne 61' | Report | Stanton (yellow card) 43'; Dagnall 45' | Stadium: Don Valley Stadium; Attendance: 3,602; Referee: Gary Sutton |

| 29 August 2009 5 | Rochdale | 3–0 | Bury | Rochdale |
| 15:00 BST | Dagnall (yellow card) 29' (goal) 73'; Thompson 59'; Flynn (yellow card) 78'; Kennedy 81' (pen.) (yellow card) 81' | Report | Scott (yellow card) 12'; Robertson (yellow card) 47'; Sodje (yellow card) 80' | Stadium: Spotland Stadium; Attendance: 4,534; Referee: Keith Stroud |

| 4 September 2009 6 | Morecambe | 3–3 | Rochdale | Morecambe |
| 19:45 BST | Jevons 33', 42'; Craney 38' | Report | Dagnall 48'; Thompson 64'; Stephens 76' | Stadium: Christie Park; Attendance: 2,367; Referee: Neil Swarbrick |

| 12 September 2009 7 | Rochdale | 2–1 | Torquay United | Rochdale |
| 15:00 BST | Dagnall 25', 76' | Report | Robertson (yellow card) 37'; Hargreaves 90' | Stadium: Spotland Stadium; Attendance: 2,407; Referee: Peter Quinn |

| 19 September 2009 8 | Northampton Town | 1–2 | Rochdale | Northampton |
| 15:00 BST | Gilligan 64' | Report | O'Grady 19'; Buckley 68' | Stadium: Sixfields Stadium; Attendance: 4,048; Referee: Darren Sheldrake |

| 26 September 2009 9 | Rochdale | 4–1 | Hereford United | Rochdale |
| 15:00 BST | Dagnall 19'; Whaley 45'; Kennedy (yellow card) 69'; Buckley 80'; Dawson 83' | Report | Pugh 23'; Jones (yellow card) 45'; Green (yellow card) 71' (yellow-red card) 90'; Gwynne (yellow card) 86' | Stadium: Spotland Stadium; Attendance: 2,620; Referee: Craig Pawson |

| 29 September 2009 10 | Darlington | 0–2 | Rochdale | Darlington |
| 19:45 BST | | Report | Buckley 60'; O'Grady 81' | Stadium: The Darlington Arena; Attendance: 1,748; Referee: Steve Rushton |

| 4 October 2009 11 | Burton Albion | 1–0 | Rochdale | Burton |
| 15:00 BST | Walker 3'; Simpson (yellow card) 55' | Report | Kennedy (yellow card) 63' | Stadium: Pirelli Stadium; Attendance: 3,119; Referee: Fred Graham |

| 10 October 2009 12 | Rochdale | 2–1 | Barnet | Rochdale |
| 15:00 BST | Dagnall 11'; Kennedy 45' (pen.); Jones (yellow card) 75' | Report | Hyde 84'; Cole (yellow card) 87'; Hughes (yellow card) 90' | Stadium: Spotland Stadium; Attendance: 2,648; Referee: Colin Webster |

| 17 October 2009 13 | Grimsby Town | 0–2 | Rochdale | Grimsby |
| 15:00 BST | Wood (yellow card) 58'; Bore (yellow card) 87' | Report | Rundle 24'; O'Grady 85' | Stadium: Blundell Park; Attendance: 3,754; Referee: Jonathan Moss |

| 24 October 2009 14 | Rochdale | 1–2 | Accrington Stanley | Rochdale |
| 15:00 BST | Dagnall 90' | Report | Edwards (yellow card) 39'; Kempson (yellow card) 43'; Grant 45'; Symes (yellow card) 54' (goal) 70' | Stadium: Spotland Stadium; Attendance: 3,206; Referee: Russell Booth |

| 31 October 2009 15 | Bournemouth | 0–4 | Rochdale | Bournemouth |
| 15:00 GMT | Garry (yellow card) 65'; Cummings (yellow card) 83' | Report | Kennedy (yellow card) 36'; Dagnall 45'; O'Grady 63', 72'; Whaley (yellow card) 66' (goal) 69'; Stanton (red card) 82' | Stadium: Goldsands Stadium; Attendance: 6,378; Referee: Phil Crossley |

| 14 November 2009 16 | Rochdale | 2–3 | Chesterfield | Rochdale |
| 15:00 GMT | O'Grady 49'; Dawson 52'; Wiseman (yellow card) 90' | Report | Lester 25', 28'; Perkins 63'; Picken (yellow card) 79' | Stadium: Spotland Stadium; Attendance: 3,011; Referee: P Gibbs |

| 21 November 2009 17 | Dagenham & Redbridge | 1–2 | Rochdale | Dagenham |
| 15:00 GMT | Gain 3'; Thomas (red card) 90' | Report | Higginbotham 70'; Dawson 72'; Kennedy (yellow card) 87' | Stadium: Victoria Road; Attendance: 2,235; Referee: Keith Stroud |

| 24 November 2009 18 | Rochdale | 2–1 | Notts County | Rochdale |
| 19:45 GMT | Dagnall 41' (pen.); O'Grady 45' | Report | Jackson (yellow card) 10'; Lee (yellow card) 14'; Davies 35'; Hunt (yellow card) 45' | Stadium: Spotland Stadium; Attendance: 2,779; Referee: Nigel Miller |

| 1 December 2009 19 | Bradford City | 0–3 | Rochdale | Bradford |
| 19:45 GMT | | Report | Dagnall 12', 28'; Kennedy (yellow card) 54'; O'Grady 58' | Stadium: Valley Parade; Attendance: 11,472; Referee: Dave Foster |

| 5 December 2009 20 | Rochdale | 3–0 | Macclesfield Town | Rochdale |
| 15:00 GMT | Stanton (yellow card) 9'; Kennedy (yellow card) 26'; Atkinson 30'; Wiseman 33'; Taylor 90' | Report | Tremarco (yellow card) 52'; Brisley (red card) 69' | Stadium: Spotland Stadium; Attendance: 3,003; Referee: S D Cook |

| 12 December 2009 21 | Lincoln City | 1–3 | Rochdale | Lincoln |
| 15:00 GMT | Lichaj (yellow card) 20'; Herd 23' (yellow card) 73'; Hughton (yellow card) 69' | Report | O'Grady 36'; Dawson 45'; Thompson 59' | Stadium: Sincil Bank; Attendance: 3,293; Referee: Andy Woolmer |

| 19 December 2009 22 | Rochdale | 4–0 | Shrewsbury Town | Rochdale |
| 15:00 GMT | Dawson 8', 53'; O'Grady 38', 67' | Report | | Stadium: Spotland Stadium; Attendance: 2,596; Referee: Rob Shoebridge |

| 26 December 2009 23 | Crewe Alexandra | 2–2 | Rochdale | Crewe |
| 15:00 GMT | Westwood 71'; Tootle 77' | Report | Dawson 53'; Higginbotham 74'; Kennedy (yellow card) 90' | Stadium: Gresty Road; Attendance: 5,563; Referee: Oliver Langford |

| 28 December 2009 24 | Rochdale | 4–1 | Morecambe | Rochdale |
| 15:00 GMT | O'Grady 12'; Dagnall 22'; Atkinson 72', 86' | Report | Hunter (yellow card) 53'; Wilson (yellow card) 63'; Curtis 84' | Stadium: Spotland Stadium; Attendance: 4,309; Referee: Graham Salisbury |

| 19 January 2010 25 | Aldershot Town | 1–1 | Rochdale | Aldershot |
| 19:45 GMT | Soares 87' | Report | Dagnall 74' | Stadium: Recreation Ground; Attendance: 2,453; Referee: Graham Scott |

| 23 January 2010 26 | Cheltenham Town | 1–4 | Rochdale | Cheltenham |
| 15:00 GMT | Townsend (yellow card) 44' (goal) 90' | Report | O'Grady 18', 49', 90'; Dawson 56' | Stadium: Whaddon Road; Attendance: 3,460; Referee: Graham Horwood |

| 26 January 2010 27 | Rochdale | 0–0 | Port Vale | Rochdale |
| 19:45 GMT | | Report | Owen (yellow card) 87' | Stadium: Spotland Stadium; Attendance: 3,081; Referee: Craig Pawson |

| 1 February 2010 28 | Bury | 1–0 | Rochdale | Bury |
| 19:45 GMT | Sodje (yellow card) 63'; Lowe 78' | Report | Kennedy (yellow card) 48'; Wiseman (yellow card) 69' | Stadium: Gigg Lane; Attendance: 6,528; Referee: Andy Penn |

| 6 February 2010 29 | Rochdale | 2–0 | Crewe Alexandra | Rochdale |
| 15:00 GMT | O'Grady 8'; Tootle 46' (o.g.) | Report | | Stadium: Spotland; Attendance: 3,164; Referee: Steve Rushton |

| 20 February 2010 30 | Rochdale | 3–1 | Dagenham & Redbridge | Rochdale |
| 15:00 GMT | Obadeyi 9'; Jones 83'; O'Grady 90' | Report | Scott 10'; Gain (yellow card) 45'; Green (yellow card) 60'; Ogogo (yellow card) 90' | Stadium: Spotland; Attendance: 3,153; Referee: Kevin Wright |

| 23 February 2010 31 | Rochdale | 1–3 | Bradford City | Rochdale |
| 19:45 GMT | Obadeyi (yellow card) 38'; Dagnall 45'; Stanton (yellow card) 79' | Report | Clarke 10'; Bullock (yellow card) 20'; Threlfall 80'; Evans 87' | Stadium: Spotland; Attendance: 3,055; Referee: Christopher Sarginson |

| 27 February 2010 32 | Macclesfield Town | 0–1 | Rochdale | Macclesfield |
| 15:00 GMT | Draper (yellow card) 34' | Report | O'Grady 60'; Atkinson (yellow card) 66' | Stadium: Moss Rose; Attendance: 2,462; Referee: Mark Haywood |

| 2 March 2010 33 | Rochdale | 4–0 | Rotherham United | Rochdale |
| 19:45 GMT | Dagnall 9'; Dawson (yellow card) 32' (goal) 71'; Kennedy (yellow card) 52'; Green 64' (o.g.); O'Grady 74'; Atkinson (yellow card) 80' | Report | | Stadium: Spotland Stadium; Attendance: 3,502; Referee: Steve Tanner |

| 6 March 2010 34 | Rochdale | 1–1 | Lincoln City | Rochdale |
| 15:00 GMT | Dagnall 70' (yellow card) 76' | Report | Herd 27'; Broughton (yellow card) 75'; Somma (yellow card) 76'; Lennon (yellow card) 89'; Burch (yellow card) 90' | Stadium: Spotland Stadium; Attendance: 3,453; Referee: Dave Foster |

| 13 March 2010 35 | Shrewsbury Town | 0–1 | Rochdale | Shrewsbury |
| 15:00 GMT | Cansdell-Sherriff (red card) 75' | Report | Thompson 62'; O'Grady (yellow card) 68' | Stadium: New Meadow; Attendance: 6,081; Referee: Andy D'Urso |

| 20 March 2010 36 | Accrington Stanley | 2–4 | Rochdale | Accrington |
| 15:00 GMT | Joyce (yellow card) 39'; Symes 61' (yellow card) 74'; Miles 65' | Report | Dagnall (yellow card) 22'; Jones 67', 72'; Taylor (red card) 75'; O'Grady 83'; Higginbotham 90' | Stadium: Crown Ground; Attendance: 3,025; Referee: Graham Salisbury |

| 27 March 2010 37 | Rochdale | 4–1 | Grimsby Town | Rochdale |
| 15:00 GMT | Thompson 17'; Dagnall 20', 41', 90'; O'Grady (yellow card) 59' | Report | Chambers 43'; Atkinson (yellow card) 79' | Stadium: Spotland; Attendance: 4,724; Referee: Fred Graham |

| 3 April 2010 38 | Chesterfield | 2–0 | Rochdale | Chesterfield |
| 15:00 BST | Whing (yellow card) 63'; Conlon 68' (pen.), 83' (pen.); Rundle (yellow card) 75' | Report | McArdle (yellow card) 84' | Stadium: Saltergate; Attendance: 4,471; Referee: Peter Quinn |

| 5 April 2010 39 | Rochdale | 0–0 | Bournemouth | Rochdale |
| 15:00 BST | Higginbotham (yellow card) 9'; Dagnall (yellow card) 59' | Report | Bartley (yellow card) 17' | Stadium: Spotland; Attendance: 5,027; Referee: Carl Boyeson |

| 10 April 2010 40 | Torquay United | 5–0 | Rochdale | Torquay |
| 15:00 BST | Rendell 29'; Benyon 31', 35'; Wroe 62' (pen.); Carayol 77' | Report | Fielding (yellow card) 60' | Stadium: Plainmoor; Attendance: 3,093; Referee: Gary Sutton |

| 13 April 2010 41 | Rochdale | 0–1 | Darlington | Rochdale |
| 19:45 BST | | Report | Mulligan 35'; Miller (yellow card) 82'; Redmond (yellow card) 90' | Stadium: Spotland Stadium; Attendance: 5,371; Referee: Oliver Langford |

| 17 April 2010 42 | Rochdale | 1–0 | Northampton Town | Rochdale |
| 15:00 BST | O'Grady 23'; Stanton (yellow card) 69' | Report | Beckwith (yellow card) 8'; Gilbert (yellow card) 45' | Stadium: Spotland; Attendance: 5,025; Referee: Andy Haines |

| 20 April 2010 43 | Notts County | 1–0 | Rochdale | Nottingham |
| 19:45 BST | Hughes 30'; Lee (yellow card) 51' | Report | | Stadium: Meadow Lane; Attendance: 10,536; Referee: Mark Halsey |

| 24 April 2010 44 | Hereford United | 2–1 | Rochdale | Hereford |
| 15:00 BST | King 52'; Valentine 61'; Green (yellow card) 78' | Report | Jones (yellow card) 27' (goal) 62'; McArdle (yellow card) 85' | Stadium: Edgar Street; Attendance: 1,975; Referee: David Webb |

| 1 May 2010 45 | Rochdale | 1–2 | Burton Albion | Rochdale |
| 15:00 BST | O'Grady 79' | Report | Penn (yellow card) 45'; Taylor 62'; Harrad 66' (pen.); Parkes (yellow card) 79' | Stadium: Spotland; Attendance: 3,749; Referee: Karl Evans |

| 8 May 2010 46 | Barnet | 1–0 | Rochdale | London |
| 15:00 BST | Jarrett 90' (yellow card) 90' | Report | Holness (yellow card) 22' | Stadium: Underhill Stadium; Attendance: 4,638; Referee: Jonathan Moss |

=== FA Cup ===
| 7 November 2009 First round | Luton Town | 3–3 | Rochdale | Luton |
| 15:00 GMT | Murray (yellow card) 7'; Basham 4', 29'; Newton 21' (yellow card) 78'; White (yellow card) 90' | Report | Dawson 58'; Thompson 87', 89' | Stadium: Kenilworth Road; Attendance: 3,167; Referee: Danny McDermid |

| 11 November 2009 First round replay | Rochdale | 0–2 | Luton Town | Rochdale |
| 20:00 GMT | | Report | Nicholls (yellow card) 16'; White (yellow card) 34'; Gallen 64', 70'; Gnakpa (yellow card) 85' | Stadium: Spotland; Attendance: 1,982; Referee: Anthony Bates |

=== League Cup ===
| 11 August 2009 First round | Sheffield Wednesday | 3–0 | Rochdale | Sheffield |
| 19:45 BST | Esajas 19'; Johnson 21', 50' | Report | Kennedy (yellow card) 90' | Stadium: Hillsborough; Attendance: 6,696; Referee: Christopher Sarginson |

=== EFL Trophy ===
| 1 September 2009 First round | Rochdale | 1–2 | Bradford City | Rochdale |
| 19:15 BST | Dawson 59' | Report | Flynn 74'; Neilson 79' | Stadium: Spotland; Attendance: 1,800; Referee: Geoff Eltringham |
