= 2010–11 Rochdale A.F.C. season =

English football club season

Rochdale A.F.C.
2010–11 season
- Chairman: Chris Dunphy
- Manager: Keith Hill
- Stadium: Spotland Stadium; Rochdale, Greater Manchester
- League One: 9th
- FA Cup: Second round
- League Cup: First round
- League Trophy: Second round
- Top goalscorer: League: Gary Jones (17 goals); All: Gary Jones (19 goals)
Home colours	Away colours	Third colours

The 2010–11 season was Rochdale A.F.C.'s 104th in existence and their first season in League One following promotion from League Two the previous season. Along with competing in League One, the club participated in the FA Cup, Football League Cup and Football League Trophy. The season covers the period from 1 July 2010 to 30 June 2011.

This was the club's first season in the third tier since 1974. A 9th place finish was their highest league finish since 1970.

== League table ==
Pos	Team	Pld	W	D	L	GF	GA	GD	Pts
7	Leyton Orient	46	19	13	14	71	62	+9	70
8	Exeter City	46	20	10	16	66	73	−7	70
9	Rochdale	46	18	14	14	63	55	+8	68
10	Colchester United	46	16	14	16	57	63	−6	62
11	Brentford	46	17	10	19	55	62	−7	61

Updated to match(es) played on 2 May 2011. Source: BBC
Rules for classification: 1) points; 2) goal difference; 3) number of goals scored.

== Statistics ==
No.	Pos	Nat	Player	Total		League One		FA Cup		League Cup		League Trophy	
No.	Pos	Nat	Player	Apps	Goals	Apps	Goals	Apps	Goals	Apps	Goals	Apps	Goals
1	GK	(England) ENG	Josh Lillis	27	0	23 + 0	0	1 + 0	0	2 + 0	0	1 + 0	0
2	DF	(Gibraltar) GIB	Scott Wiseman	41	0	37 + 0	0	1 + 0	0	2 + 0	0	1 + 0	0
3	DF	(England) ENG	Joe Widdowson	38	0	30 + 4	0	1 + 0	0	2 + 0	0	0 + 1	0
4	DF	(England) ENG	Marcus Holness	50	1	46 + 0	1	1 + 0	0	2 + 0	0	1 + 0	0
6	MF	(Republic of Ireland) IRL	Brian Barry-Murphy	36	0	31 + 1	0	1 + 0	0	2 + 0	0	1 + 0	0
7	MF	(England) ENG	Jason Kennedy	48	4	44 + 1	4	1 + 0	0	2 + 0	0	0 + 0	0
8	MF	(England) ENG	Gary Jones	49	19	45 + 1	17	1 + 0	0	2 + 0	2	0 + 0	0
9	FW	(England) ENG	Anthony Elding	21	5	9 + 8	3	1 + 0	1	1 + 1	1	1 + 0	0
10	FW	(England) ENG	Jack Redshaw	3	0	0 + 2	0	0 + 0	0	0 + 0	0	1 + 0	0
11	FW	(Wales) WAL	Matt Done	36	6	16 + 17	5	0 + 0	0	0 + 2	0	1 + 0	1
12	DF	(England) ENG	Alan Goodall	6	0	3 + 2	0	0 + 0	0	0 + 0	0	1 + 0	0
13	GK	(Wales) WAL	Owain Fôn Williams	22	0	22 + 0	0	0 + 0	0	0 + 0	0	0 + 0	0
13	GK	(England) ENG	Danny Taberner	0	0	0 + 0	0	0 + 0	0	0 + 0	0	0 + 0	0
14	FW	(France) FRA	Jean-Louis Akpa Akpro	36	4	8 + 24	4	0 + 1	0	1 + 1	0	1 + 0	0
15	MF	(England) ENG	Joe Thompson	34	2	19 + 13	2	0 + 0	0	1 + 0	0	1 + 0	0
16	MF	(England) ENG	Will Atkinson	21	2	15 + 6	2	0 + 0	0	0 + 0	0	0 + 0	0
16	MF	(England) ENG	Andrew Tutte	9	0	5 + 2	0	0 + 0	0	1 + 0	0	0 + 1	0
17	MF	(England) ENG	Bobby Grant	6	2	5 + 1	2	0 + 0	0	0 + 0	0	0 + 0	0
17	FW	(England) ENG	Deane Smalley	3	0	0 + 3	0	0 + 0	0	0 + 0	0	0 + 0	0
17	DF	(England) ENG	Robbie Williams	9	0	9 + 0	0	0 + 0	0	0 + 0	0	0 + 0	0
18	DF	(England) ENG	Josh Thompson	14	1	11 + 1	1	0 + 0	0	0 + 1	0	1 + 0	0
19	FW	(England) ENG	Chris O'Grady	49	9	45 + 1	9	1 + 0	0	2 + 0	0	0 + 0	0
20	FW	(England) ENG	Liam Dickinson	14	0	7 + 7	0	0 + 0	0	0 + 0	0	0 + 0	0
21	GK	(Scotland) SCO	Matty Edwards	1	0	0 + 1	0	0 + 0	0	0 + 0	0	0 + 0	0
22	MF	(England) ENG	David Flitcroft	0	0	0 + 0	0	0 + 0	0	0 + 0	0	0 + 0	0
23	DF	(England) ENG	Tom Kennedy	6	0	6 + 0	0	0 + 0	0	0 + 0	0	0 + 0	0
24	DF	(England) ENG	Chris Brown	0	0	0 + 0	0	0 + 0	0	0 + 0	0	0 + 0	0
25	MF	(England) ENG	Callum Byrne	0	0	0 + 0	0	0 + 0	0	0 + 0	0	0 + 0	0
26	DF	(England) ENG	Craig Dawson	48	11	44 + 1	10	1 + 0	1	2 + 0	0	0 + 0	0
27	FW	(Nigeria) NGR	Godwin Abadaki	0	0	0 + 0	0	0 + 0	0	0 + 0	0	0 + 0	0
27	DF	(England) ENG	Josh Brizell	0	0	0 + 0	0	0 + 0	0	0 + 0	0	0 + 0	0
28	DF	(England) ENG	Matthew Flynn	1	0	0 + 1	0	0 + 0	0	0 + 0	0	0 + 0	0
29	MF	(Wales) WAL	Nicky Adams	31	0	25 + 5	0	1 + 0	0	0 + 0	0	0 + 0	0
31	GK	(England) ENG	Luke Daniels	1	0	1 + 0	0	0 + 0	0	0 + 0	0	0 + 0	0
31	GK	(England) ENG	Ryan Jones	0	0	0 + 0	0	0 + 0	0	0 + 0	0	0 + 0	0
32	GK	(England) ENG	Chris Oldfield	0	0	0 + 0	0	0 + 0	0	0 + 0	0	0 + 0	0
34	FW	(Angola) ANG	Helio André	2	0	0 + 1	0	0 + 0	0	0 + 0	0	0 + 1	0
35	FW	(Republic of Ireland) IRL	Scott Hogan	0	0	0 + 0	0	0 + 0	0	0 + 0	0	0 + 0	0
36	MF	(England) ENG	Reece Gray	2	1	0 + 2	1	0 + 0	0	0 + 0	0	0 + 0	0
	GK	(England) ENG	Jordan Andrews	0	0	0 + 0	0	0 + 0	0	0 + 0	0	0 + 0	0

== Results ==
=== Pre-season Friendlies ===
24 July 2010	Rochdale	1–1	Bolton Wanderers	Rochdale
15:00 BST		Report		Stadium: Spotland Stadium

=== League One ===
7 August 2010 1	Rochdale	0–0	Hartlepool United	Rochdale
15:00 BST	Widdowson (yellow card) 83'	Report		Stadium: Spotland Stadium; Attendance: 3,706; Referee: Andy Penn

14 August 2010 2	Brighton & Hove Albion	2–2	Rochdale	Brighton
15:00 BST	Murray 47'; Greer (red card) 52'; Bennett 67'	Report	Jones 53' (pen.), 90'	Stadium: Withdean Stadium; Attendance: 6,602; Referee: Danny McDermid

21 August 2010 3	Rochdale	1–2	Colchester United	Rochdale
15:00 BST	Dawson 47'	Report	Bond 38'; Henderson 84'	Stadium: Spotland Stadium; Attendance: 3,016; Referee: Nigel Miller

28 August 2010 4	Brentford	1–3	Rochdale	Brentford
15:00 BST	Simpson 27'	Report	Elding 11'; Holness (yellow card) 51'; O'Grady 60'; Kennedy 62' (yellow card) 18' (yellow-red card) 62'	Stadium: Griffin Park; Attendance: 4,636; Referee: Simon Hooper

4 September 2010 5	Southampton	0–2	Rochdale	Southampton
15:00 BST		Report	O'Grady 45'; Jones 68'	Stadium: St Mary's Stadium; Attendance: 18,169; Referee: Andy Woolmer

11 September 2010 6	Rochdale	3–2	Walsall	Rochdale
15:00 BST	J.W. Thompson 27'; Elding 44'; Jones 65' (pen.); Tutte (yellow card) 90'	Report	Macken 4'; Byfield 45'; Davis (yellow card) 85'	Stadium: Spotland Stadium; Attendance: 3,174; Referee: Colin Webster

18 September 2010 7	Milton Keynes Dons	1–1	Rochdale	Milton Keynes
15:00 BST	Doumbé 28'; Lewington (yellow card) 78'; Chadwick (yellow card) 87'	Report	Kennedy 20'; Widdowson (yellow card) 41'; J.W. Thompson (yellow card) 49'; Goodall (yellow card) 90'	Stadium: Stadium mk Attendance: 7,034; Referee: Keith Hill

25 September 2010 8	Rochdale	1–1	Plymouth Argyle	Rochdale
15:00 BST	Dawson 64' (yellow card) 90'; Barry-Murphy (yellow card) 90'	Report	Wright-Phillips 18'; Noone (yellow card) 71'	Stadium: Spotland Stadium; Attendance: 3,294; Referee: Peter Quinn

28 September 2010 9	Rochdale	3–0	Huddersfield Town	Rochdale
19:45 BST	Kennedy 7'; Akpa Akpro 88'; O'Grady 90'	Report		Stadium: Spotland Stadium; Attendance: 6,121; Referee: Grant Hegley

2 October 2010 10	Exeter City	1–0	Rochdale	Exeter
15:00 BST	Cureton 49'	Report	Goodall (yellow card) 37'; J. Thompson (yellow card) 75'	Stadium: St James Park; Attendance: 5,363; Referee: Stephen Tanner

9 October 2010 11	Rochdale	0–1	Yeovil Town	Rochdale
15:00 BST	Dawson (yellow card) 22'; Widdowson (yellow card) 70'; Done (yellow card) 87'	Report	Freeman 66'; Smith (yellow card) 90'	Stadium: Spotland Stadium; Attendance: 3,150; Referee: Andy Haines

16 October 2010 12	Bristol Rovers	2–1	Rochdale	Bristol
15:00 BST	Hughes 45' (pen.); Lines 82'	Report	Anthony 86' (o.g.); Jones (yellow card) 87'	Stadium: Memorial Stadium; Attendance: 5,872; Referee: Craig Pawson

23 October 2010 13	Rochdale	3–2	Dagenham & Redbridge	Rochdale
15:00 BST	O'Grady 22'; Elding 35'; Jones 58'; Akpa Akpro (yellow card) 90'	Report	Green (yellow card) 61'; Scannell 64'; Arber 68'; Gain (yellow card) 83'	Stadium: Spotland Stadium; Attendance: 2,650; Referee: Jock Waugh

30 October 2010 14	Leyton Orient	2–1	Rochdale	London
15:00 BST	Chorley 48' (pen.); Cox 66'; Forbes (yellow card) 76'	Report	O'Grady 45'; Adams (yellow card) 77'	Stadium: Brisbane Road; Attendance: 4,880; Referee: Kevin Wright

13 November 2010 15	Sheffield Wednesday	2–0	Rochdale	Sheffield
15:00 GMT	Coke 62' (yellow card) 88'; Morrison 82'	Report		Stadium: Hillsborough Stadium; Attendance: 16,520; Referee: Steve Rushton

20 November 2010 16	Rochdale	3–3	Swindon Town	Rochdale
15:00 GMT	Jones 20' (pen.), 85' (pen.); J.W. Thompson (yellow card) 52'; Grant 64'	Report	Timlin 1'; Austin 78'; Rose 80'	Stadium: Spotland Stadium; Attendance: 2,866; Referee: Mark Brown

23 November 2010 17	Carlisle United	1–1	Rochdale	Carlisle
19:45 GMT	Madine 20'; Michalík (yellow card) 47' (yellow-red card) 61'	Report	Dawson (yellow card) 34'; Jones 62' (pen.); Holness (yellow card) 78'; Done (yellow card) 89'	Stadium: Brunton Park; Attendance: 7,412; Referee: Neil Swarbrick

27 November 2010 18	Rochdale	1–1	Oldham Athletic	Rochdale
15:00 GMT	Done 37'	Report	Evina 16'; Kelly (yellow card) 80'; Mvoto (yellow card) 83'	Stadium: Spotland Stadium; Attendance: 6,483; Referee: Anthony Bates

10 December 2010 19	Peterborough United	2–1	Rochdale	Peterborough
19:45 GMT	McLean 19'; Mackail-Smith 50'	Report	Akpa Akpro 79'	Stadium: London Road Stadium; Attendance: 4,233; Referee: Mark Haywood

1 January 2011 20	Rochdale	3–2	Tranmere Rovers	Rochdale
15:00 GMT	Jones 26' (pen.), 44' (pen.); Barry-Murphy (yellow card) 56'; Kennedy (yellow card) 80'; Grant (yellow card) 67' (goal) 84'	Report	Broomes (red card) 24'; Thomas-Moore (yellow card) 36' (goal) 81' (pen.); Labadie 42'; Goodison (yellow card) 67'	Stadium: Spotland Stadium; Attendance: 3,436; Referee: Carl Boyeson

3 January 2011 21	Oldham Athletic	1–2	Rochdale	Oldham
15:00 GMT	Stephens (yellow card) 63'; Trotman (yellow card) 79'; Furman 87'	Report	O'Grady 64', 76'; Wiseman (red card) 85'	Stadium: Boundary Park; Attendance: 7,251; Referee: Anthony Taylor

8 January 2011 22	Dagenham & Redbridge	0–1	Rochdale	Dagenham
15:00 GMT		Report	O'Grady 74'	Stadium: Victoria Road; Attendance: 1,948; Referee: G Hegley

15 January 2011 23	Rochdale	1–1	Leyton Orient	Rochdale
15:00 GMT	Forbes 35' (o.g.)	Report	Spring (yellow card) 37'; Chorley 60'	Stadium: Spotland Stadium; Attendance: 2,731; Referee: Andy Haines

18 January 2011 24	Rochdale	0–0	Bournemouth	Rochdale
19:45 GMT		Report		Stadium: Spotland Stadium; Attendance: 2,312; Referee: Rob Shoebridge

22 January 2011 25	Yeovil Town	0–1	Rochdale	Yeovil
15:00 GMT	Welsh (yellow card) 83'	Report	Jones 17'; Fôn Williams (yellow card) 77'; J.W. Thompson (yellow card) 89'; Wiseman (yellow card) 90'	Attendance: 3,711; Referee: Danny McDermid

1 February 2011 26	Tranmere Rovers	1–1	Rochdale	Birkenhead
19:45 GMT	Elford-Alliyu 4'; Kay (yellow card) 55'; Labadie (yellow card) 59'	Report	Akpa Akpro (yellow card) 82'; Jones 90'	Stadium: Prenton Park; Attendance: 4,766; Referee: Darren Drysdale

5 February 2011 27	Swindon Town	1–1	Rochdale	Swindon
15:00 GMT	Dossevi (yellow card) 82'; Benyon 90'	Report	Dawson 81'	Stadium: County Ground; Attendance: 7,386; Referee: Graham Horwood

8 February 2011 28	Rochdale	3–1	Bristol Rovers	Rochdale
19:45 GMT	Dawson 72'; Done 90'; Akpa Akpro 90'	Report	Bolger (yellow card) 51' (yellow-red card) 74'; Hoskins 79'; Kalala (yellow card) 81'; Williams (yellow card) 90'	Stadium: Spotland Stadium; Attendance: 2,372; Referee: Bobby Madley

12 February 2011 29	Rochdale	2–1	Sheffield Wednesday	Rochdale
15:00 GMT	Done 15' (yellow card) 90'; Jones 27' (pen.)	Report	Madine 90'	Stadium: Spotland Stadium; Attendance: 6,154; Referee: Peter Walton

26 February 2011 30	Walsall	0–0	Rochdale	Walsall
15:00 GMT		Report		Stadium: Bescot Stadium; Attendance: 3,830; Referee: Gary Sutton

5 March 2011 31	Rochdale	1–4	Milton Keynes Dons	Rochdale
15:00 GMT	Dawson 81'; Widdowson (yellow card) 84'; Dickinson (yellow card) 89'	Report	Vine 15'; Powell 19'; Leven (yellow card) 38'; Gleeson 45'; Baldock 89' (pen.)	Stadium: Spotland Stadium; Attendance: 2,837; Referee: Jon Moss

8 March 2011 32	Huddersfield Town	2–1	Rochdale	Huddersfield
19:45 GMT	Afobe 25'; Roberts 33'	Report	Jones 90'	Stadium: John Smith's Stadium; Attendance: 12,531; Referee: Nigel Miller

12 March 2011 33	Rochdale	0–1	Exeter City	Rochdale
15:00 GMT		Report	Cureton 30'	Stadium: Spotland Stadium; Attendance: 2,726; Referee: Dave Foster

15 March 2011 34	Rochdale	1–0	Notts County	Rochdale
19:45 GMT	Dawson 46'	Report	Sproule (yellow card) 81'; Edwards (yellow card) 87'	Stadium: Spotland Stadium; Attendance: 2,019; Referee: Graham Salisbury

19 March 2011 35	Plymouth Argyle	0–1	Rochdale	Plymouth
15:00 GMT		Report	Jones 49'	Stadium: Home Park; Attendance: 8,361; Referee: Simon Hooper

25 March 2011 36	Hartlepool United	0–2	Rochdale	Hartlepool
19:45 GMT	Horwood (yellow card) 54'	Report	Jones 23'; Dawson 56' (yellow card) 67'	Stadium: Victoria Park; Attendance: 3,081; Referee: Mark Brown

29 March 2011 37	Rochdale	2–0	Charlton Athletic	Rochdale
19:45 BST	Kennedy 35'; Dawson 76'	Report	Wagstaff (yellow card) 78'	Stadium: Spotland Stadium; Attendance: 2,589; Referee: Eddie Ilderton

2 April 2011 38	Rochdale	2–2	Brighton & Hove Albion	Rochdale
15:00 BST	Kennedy (yellow card) 7'; Atkinson 22'; Wiseman (yellow card) 36'; Jones 71' (pen.)	Report	Painter (yellow card) 27'; Wood 29' (pen.); Dicker 51'; Navarro (yellow card) 76'	Stadium: Spotland Stadium; Attendance: 3,959; Referee: David Webb

5 April 2011 39	Notts County	1–2	Rochdale	Nottingham
19:45 BST	Hughes 54'; Ravenhill (yellow card) 60'	Report	Dawson 7'; Atkinson 15'; Jones (yellow card) 45'	Stadium: Meadow Lane; Attendance: 4,689; Referee: Mick Russell

9 April 2011 40	Colchester United	1–0	Rochdale	Colchester
15:00 BST	Henderson 87'	Report		Stadium: Colchester Community Stadium; Attendance: 4,052; Referee: Roger East

12 April 2011 41	Rochdale	2–0	Southampton	Rochdale
19:45 BST	J. Thompson 28'; O'Grady 41'	Report		Stadium: Spotland Stadium; Attendance: 3,825; Referee: Mark Haywood

16 April 2011 42	Rochdale	0–1	Brentford	Rochdale
15:00 BST	Jones (yellow card) 65'	Report	Diagouraga (yellow card) 28'; Simpson 79'	Stadium: Spotland Stadium; Attendance: 2,963; Referee: Darren Drysdale

23 April 2011 43	Rochdale	2–3	Carlisle United	Rochdale
15:00 BST	J. Thompson 30' (yellow card) 63'; Done 49'	Report	Holness 25' (o.g.); Noble 60'; Robson 65'	Stadium: Spotland Stadium; Attendance: 3,762; Referee: Steve Rushton

25 April 2011 44	Charlton Athletic	3–1	Rochdale	London
15:00 BST	Wright-Phillips (yellow card) 25'; Racon 31'; Parrett 52'; Eccleston 76'	Report	Atkinson (yellow card) 35'; Holness 51'; Wiseman (yellow card) 71'; Adams (yellow card) 79'	Stadium: The Valley; Attendance: 13,253; Referee: Pat Miller

30 April 2011 45	Rochdale	2–2	Peterborough United	Rochdale
15:00 BST	Akpa Akpro 1'; Dawson 87'	Report	Mendez-Laing 45'; Tomlin 46'; Mackail-Smith (yellow card) 81'	Stadium: Spotland Stadium; Attendance: 3,147; Referee: Peter Quinn

7 May 2011 46	Bournemouth	1–2	Rochdale	Bournemouth
15:00 BST	Pearce 27'	Report	Done 35'; Barry-Murphy (yellow card) 61'; Gray 80' (yellow card) 90'	Stadium: Goldsands Stadium; Attendance: 9,005; Referee: Gavin Ward

=== FA Cup ===
5 November 2010 1	Rochdale	2–3	F.C. United of Manchester	Rochdale
19:45 GMT	Elding 53'; Dawson 78'; Lillis (yellow card) 90'; Holness (yellow card) 90'	Report	Platt 42'; Cottrell 49'; Deegan (yellow card) 61'; Norton 90'	Stadium: Spotland Stadium; Attendance: 7,048; Referee: Geoff Eltringham

=== League Cup ===
10 August 2010 1	Barnsley	0–1	Rochdale	Barnsley
19:45 BST	Doyle (yellow card) 63'	Report	Elding 56'	Stadium: Oakwell; Attendance: 4107; Referee: Geoff Eltringham

26 August 2010 2	Birmingham City	3–2	Rochdale	Birmingham
19:45 BST	McFadden 28' (pen.); Murphy 48'; Derbyshire 53'	Report	Jones 26', 76'	Stadium: St Andrew's; Attendance: 6431; Referee: Mick Russell

=== EFL Trophy ===
31 August 2010 1	Port Vale	2–1	Rochdale	Stoke-on-Trent
19:45 BST	M.Richards 27'; J.Richards 70'	Report	Done 79'	Stadium: Vale Park; Referee: Michael Naylor
