= Holderness (disambiguation) =

Holderness is a region of the East Riding of Yorkshire, England.

Holderness may also refer to:

- Holderness (1789 ship)
- Holderness (surname)
- Holderness (borough), a former borough of Humberside, England
- Holderness (UK Parliament constituency), a former constituency in England
- Holderness Wapentake, a former wapentake in the East Riding of Yorkshire, England
- Holderness, New Hampshire, a town in the United States
  - Holderness School, a college preparatory school in Holderness, New Hampshire
- HMS Holderness, two ships of the Royal Navy
- Glenn/Robert G. Holderness station, a light rail station in Folsom, California.
