= Hogness =

Hogness is a surname. Notable people with the surname include:

- David Hogness (1925–2019), American biochemist
- Hanne Hogness (born 1967), Norwegian handball player
- John R. Hogness (1922–2007), American physician
- Thorfin R. Hogness (1894–1976), American physical chemist

== See also ==
- Holness
