= Josh Brizell =

English footballer

Personal information
- Full name: Joshua Daniel Brizell
- Date of birth: 15 October 1991 (age 35)
- Place of birth: Liverpool, England
- Height: 5 ft 8 in (1.73 m)
- Position: Defender

Team information
- Current team: Litherland REMYCA

Youth career
- 2007–2009: Rochdale

Senior career*
Years	Team	Apps	(Gls)
2009–2011	Rochdale	0	(0)
2011–2015	Hyde	119	(8)
2011	→ Ossett Town (loan)	1	(0)
2015	AFC Telford United		
2015–2016	Glossop North End	17	(1)
2016–2017	Marine	9	(0)
2017	Skelmersdale United		
2017–?	Colwyn Bay		
2020	Runcorn Linnets		
2020–2021	Prestatyn Town	0	(0)
2021	Liverpool NALGO	2	(0)
2021	Ramsbottom United	0	(0)
2022–	Litherland REMYCA		
- * Club domestic league appearances and goals as of 08:23, 30 September 2016 (UTC)

Joshua Daniel Brizell (born 15 October 1991) is a former English footballer who played as a defender or midfielder for Litherland REMYCA.

He started his career in the youth teams at Rochdale, captaining both the youth and reserve sides before working his way into the first team. He joined Hyde in 2011, and was sent out on loan to Ossett Town later the same year. He featured as a first-team regular for Hyde after his return.

== Career ==
=== Rochdale ===
Born in Liverpool, Brizell came through the ranks at Rochdale and captained both the youth side and reserve side, before making his debut for the first team on 11 August 2009, coming on as a second-half substitute for Marcus Holness in a 3–0 League Cup defeat at Sheffield Wednesday.

=== Hyde ===
Following his release from Rochdale, he joined Conference North side Hyde on 14 October 2011. He joined Ossett Town on an emergency loan cover basis for one match in early November 2011, a 5–0 defeat away to Witton Town on 11 November 2011.

He returned to Hyde to make his debut for the club coming on as a second-half substitute in their 0–0 draw away at Hinckley United on 14 November 2011. He made his first start for the club less than a week later as part of a 3–2 home win over Colwyn Bay. He finished his first season with Hyde having played 23 games in all competitions, scoring no goals, helping his side to the Conference North title for the 2011–12 season.

He signed a new deal at the club which would keep him at Hyde until the end of the 2012–13 season, he made his first appearance of that season on the opening day draw away at Braintree Town, Hyde first ever game in the Conference Premier. He scored his first goal for the club in March 2013, scoring the winner in a 2–1 win over Cambridge United at Ewen Fields. But just two games later he received the first red-card of his career for serious foul-play as his side drew 1–1 at Barrow. He finished his first full season with the club having played 40 times scoring one goal.

On 21 June 2013, Brizell signed a new one-year contract with Hyde. He received another red card in August 2013 on the opening day of the 2013–14 season, following a first-half tackle on Al Bangura as Hyde lost 8–0 at The New Lawn to Forest Green Rovers. He picked up his second red-card of the season in November for a late-tackle in Hyde's 4–0 defeat away at FC Halifax Town.

=== AFC Telford United ===
Brizell joined AFC Telford United, who had been newly relegated to the rebranded National League North, in June 2015. He broke his wrist during pre-season, and on return to fitness was not in the plans of new manager Rob Smith, who had replaced Steve Kittrick with Telford bottom of the league.

=== Marine ===
In July 2016 he signed for Marine.

=== Skelmersdale United ===
In March 2017 he joined Skelmersdale United.

=== Colwyn Bay ===
In August 2017 he joined Colwyn Bay.1

=== Runcorn Linnets ===
In August 2020 he joined Runcorn Linnets.

=== Prestatyn Town ===
He then joined Cymru North club Prestatyn Town in November 2020 but did not play a competitive game for the club as football remained suspended in Wales due to the ongoing COVID-19 pandemic.

=== Liverpool NALGO ===
He made two appearances for the Liverpool County Premier League team Liverpool NALGO in spring 2021.

=== Ramsbottom United ===
In August 2021 he joined Ramsbottom United. He made no competitive appearances for the club.

=== Litherland REYMCA ===
In January 2022 he joined North West Counties Football League side Litherland REMYCA on non-contract terms.

== Arrest and conviction ==
Brizell was arrested in November 2020 by North Wales Police as part of an investigation of County lines drug trafficking gangs, pleading guilty to three charges of conspiracy to supply Class A and B controlled drugs & was sentenced to 7 years & 7 months imprisonment in March 2023.

== Style of play ==
Brizell plays as a full-back, but he is just as comfortable attacking as he is defending.

== Career statistics ==
As of match played 27 April 2016

Club statistics
Club	Season	League			FA Cup		League Cup		Other		Total	
Club	Season	Division	Apps	Goals	Apps	Goals	Apps	Goals	Apps	Goals	Apps	Goals
Rochdale	2009–10	League Two	0	0	0	0	1	0	0	0	1	0
Rochdale	2010–11	League One	0	0	0	0	0	0	0	0	0	0
Rochdale	Total		0	0	0	0	1	0	0	0	1	0
Hyde	2011–12	Conference North	21	0	0	0	—		2 (Note: Appearances in FA Trophy)	0	23	0
Hyde	2012–13	Conference Premier	40	1	1	0	—		2	0	43	1
Hyde	2013–14	Conference Premier	31	2	1	0	—		0	0	32	2
Hyde	2014–15	Conference North	22	4	0	0	—		2	0	24	4
Hyde	Total		114	7	2	0	—		6	0	122	7
Ossett Town (loan)	2011–12	NPL Division One North	1	0	0	0	—		0	0	1	0
A.F.C. Telford	2015–16	National League North	0	0	0	0	—		0	0	0	0
Glossop North End	2015–16	NPL Division One North	17	1	0	0	—		3 (Note: 1 Appearance in Manchester Premier Cup) (Note: 1 Appearance in Northern Premier League Challenge Cup) (Note: 1 Appearance in Derbyshire Senior Cup)	1	20	2
Career total			132	8	2	0	1	0	9	1	144	9

== Honours ==
Hyde

- Conference North: 2011–12
