= Craig Dawson =

English footballer (born 1990)

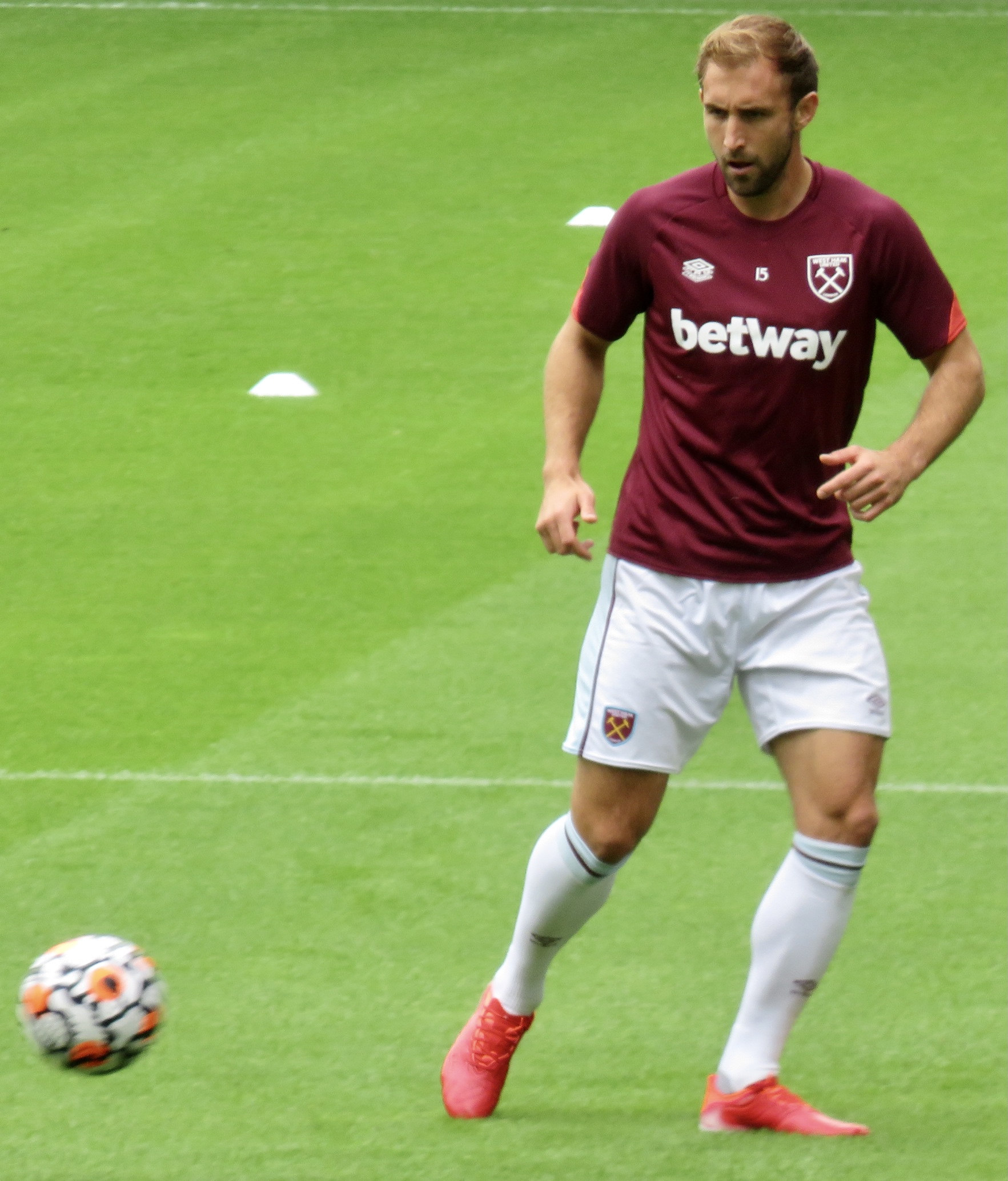
- Dawson warming up for West Ham United in 2021

Personal information
- Full name: Craig Dawson
- Date of birth: 6 May 1990 (age 36)
- Place of birth: Rochdale, England
- Height: 6 ft 2 in (1.88 m)
- Position: Centre-back

Youth career
- Rochdale St Clements

Senior career*
Years	Team	Apps	(Gls)
2007–2009	Radcliffe Borough		
2007–2008	→ Flixton (loan)		
2009–2010	Rochdale	46	(10)
2009	→ Radcliffe Borough (loan)		
2010–2019	West Bromwich Albion	194	(14)
2010–2011	→ Rochdale (loan)	41	(9)
2013	→ Bolton Wanderers (loan)	16	(4)
2019–2021	Watford	29	(2)
2020–2021	→ West Ham United (loan)	22	(3)
2021–2023	West Ham United	42	(2)
2023–2025	Wolverhampton Wanderers	57	(2)

International career
2011–2013	England U21	15	(6)
2012	Great Britain Olympic	3	(0)
- * Club domestic league appearances and goals as of 23:34, 29 December 2024 (UTC)

Craig Dawson (born 6 May 1990) is an English professional footballer who plays as a centre-back.

He has previously played for Radcliffe Borough, Bolton Wanderers, Rochdale, West Bromwich Albion, Watford, West Ham United and Wolverhampton Wanderers.

== Club career ==
=== Radcliffe Borough ===
Dawson started his career at youth club Heywood St James, before joining Rochdale St Clements. At the age of 16, whilst working as a glass collector in his local pub in Rochdale, Dawson was approached by Radcliffe Borough chairman Bernard Manning Jr, son of Bernard Manning, later making his debut for the club in a game against Salford City in the middle of the 2007–08 season. Following a loan spell at Flixton, Dawson became a first-team regular after just a few games at Radcliffe. In the two seasons he was at the club he made 95 appearances and scored 15 goals. In the season he left, he was voted the Player of the season by Radcliffe. In 2017, Dawson was included in the Northern Premier League's Greatest 100 Players for the 50th Anniversary of the league, ranking in 14th overall.

=== Rochdale ===
In February 2009, Dawson signed for his local club Rochdale on a two-year contract for a fee of £12,000, despite a bid of £30,000 from Crewe Alexandra. Although a Rochdale player, Dawson stayed at Radcliffe on loan until the end of the season. Dawson made his debut for Rochdale reserves, scoring a header from a corner against Manchester City. Dawson was set to make his debut in the second half of the 2008–09 season; however, was set back by injury. Dawson finally got his Rochdale debut on 8 August 2009, starting in the League Two clash with Port Vale at Vale Park. The match ended in a 1–1 draw. Dawson's second game was at Hillsborough Stadium in the League Cup against Sheffield Wednesday. Despite conceding three goals, Rochdale fans gave Dawson rave reviews and named him the man of the match.

He scored 10 goals in all competitions during the 2009–10 season and won a place in the League Two PFA Team of the Year.

=== West Bromwich Albion ===
On 31 August 2010, Dawson signed for Premier League club West Bromwich Albion for an undisclosed fee on a three-year contract. He made his competitive Baggies debut in a 4–1 League Cup win at AFC Bournemouth in August 2011 and the following day was called up into the England under-21's squad by Stuart Pearce, who watched him from the stands at the Dean Court on his debut. On 26 July 2011, Dawson was rewarded with a new-and-improved Albion contract. On 21 February 2012, the centre-half penned a three-and-a-half-year deal to June 2015, plus a further year's option in the club's favour. Dawson made his first Premier League start on 17 September 2011, away from home against Swansea City as a fill-in central defender for the suspended Gabriel Tamaş in a disappointing 3–0 defeat. He re-appeared in the starting eleven for the game against Manchester City in which West Brom went on to lose 4–0. Again, Dawson appeared in the next league game against Queens Park Rangers, West Brom went on to win the game 1–0. On 28 September 2014, Dawson scored his first Premier League goal for West Brom in a 4–0 home win against Burnley. He scored his next goal of the season in a 1–2 loss to West Ham United on 2 December 2014.

After the arrival of new Albion manager Tony Pulis at the start of 2015, Dawson became a regular feature in the starting lineup. While not chipping in with any more goals that season, Dawson played his part in the team achieving survival. During the 2015–16 season, Dawson was again a regular starter. His first goal of the season came in a 2–3 loss to Everton on 28 September 2015. His next goal came in a 2–2 draw away at Liverpool on 13 December 2015. On 18 February 2016, he signed a contract extension to keep him at the club until the summer of 2018. Two weeks after signing his contract extension he scored a goal in a 3–2 home win against Crystal Palace. He was also involved in the winning goal for Saido Berahino. On 25 April 2016, he became the fourth Premier League player of the season to score an own goal and a goal in the same match in a 1–1 draw away to Tottenham.

On 18 March 2017, he scored two headers from corners, as West Brom defeated Arsenal 3–1 in the Premier League, being named man of the match in the process. Dawson made 28 league appearances for West Brom in the 2017–18 season as they were relegated from the Premier League. He subsequently handed in a transfer request and refused to travel to Portugal for the club's training camp.

==== Loan to Rochdale ====
Immediately after signing for West Brom, he was loaned back to Rochdale for the remainder of the 2010–11 season.

==== Loan to Bolton Wanderers ====
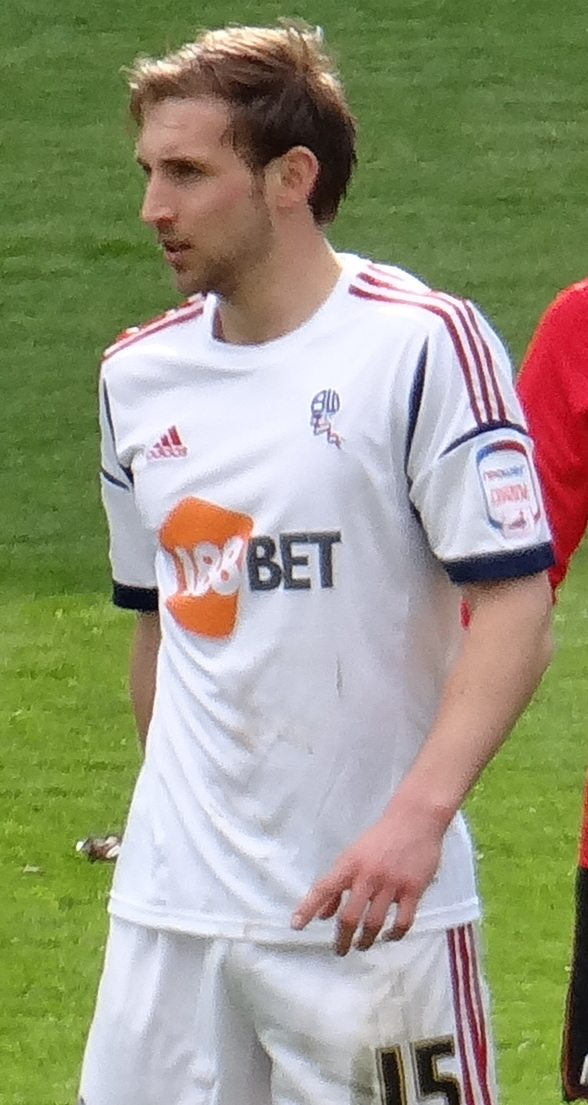
Dawson playing for Bolton Wanderers in 2013

On 23 January 2013, despite interest from Blackburn Rovers, Leicester City, Leeds United, and Nottingham Forest, Championship club Bolton Wanderers won the race to sign Dawson on loan for the rest of the season. On 23 February, Dawson scored twice in a 4–1 win against Hull City. Just three days later on 26 February, he scored the only goal in a 1–0 home win against Peterborough United. He scored for the third successive match on 2 March, scoring the winning goal in a 3–2 win against Barnsley.

=== Watford ===
On 1 July 2019, Dawson signed for Premier League club Watford for an undisclosed fee on a four-year contract.

Dawson scored his first goal for the club on 20 June 2020, An overhead kick against Leicester City. Dawson made 29 appearances for Watford in the 2019–20 season as they were relegated to the Championship. At the start of the 2020–21 season, and the appointment of a new manager, Vladimir Ivić, his selection for the team became less likely following the signings of Francisco Sierralta and William Troost-Ekong.

=== West Ham United ===
On 12 October 2020, Dawson signed for West Ham on loan for the remainder of the 2020–21 season. The club retained an option to make the transfer permanent at the end of the loan. Dawson did not make his West Ham debut until 29 December 2020; being named as Man of the Match for his performance in a 0–0 draw away to Southampton. On 11 January 2021, he scored his first goal for West Ham, against Stockport County, in the third round of the FA Cup as West Ham won 1–0. It was his first FA Cup goal for over 10 years since scoring for Rochdale against FC United of Manchester in November 2010. On 26 January 2021, he scored his first Premier League goal for West Ham, in a 3–2 away win against Crystal Palace.

On 6 April 2021, it was announced that Dawson would join West Ham United permanently at the end of the 2020–21 season on a two-year contract.

Following a long-term injury in November 2021 to regular centre-back, Angelo Ogbonna, Dawson was drafted in as a regular replacement. He scored his first Premier League goal of the 2021–22 season; a stoppage-time equaliser in a 2–2 draw away at Leicester City on 13 February 2022. Six days later, Dawson scored his fiftieth goal in professional football as he headed in the opener at home to Newcastle United. Dawson earned particular praise for his performances in West Ham's Europa League campaign. In a quarter-final game on 14 April against Lyon he scored the first goal in a 3–0 win in France and made more blocks than any other player despite taking blows to the face. His performances gained him cult status with the West Ham fans who dubbed him "Ballon D'awson". By April 2022, following further injuries to centre-backs Kurt Zouma and Issa Diop, Dawson was the only available recognised centre-back at the club. After his sending-off in an away game at Chelsea on 24 April, West Ham were left without any regular centre-backs for the following match. Following West Ham's Europa League campaign, in which they were knocked out in the semi-final, Dawson was named in the Europa League Team of the Season, alongside teammate Declan Rice.

Despite leaving the club in January 2023, Dawson received a winner's medal after West Ham won the 2023 UEFA Europa Conference League final in Prague in June 2023.

=== Wolverhampton Wanderers ===
On 22 January 2023, Wolverhampton Wanderers announced the signing of Dawson on a two-and-a-half-year deal. On 4 February 2023, Dawson scored his first goal for Wolves on his debut appearance for the club in a 3–0 home win against Liverpool in the Premier League.

When Wolves became the first team in the 2023–24 Premier League to beat reigning Champions Manchester City on 30 September 2023, Dawson was singled out for particular praise by commentators, having marked Erling Haaland out of the game to the extent the latter only had fifteen touches during the game.

Dawson scored his second Wolves goal in the final game of 2023, a 3–0 win against Everton at Molineux in the Premier League on 30 December.

On 4 December 2024, Dawson scored two own goals in a 4–0 loss to Everton, becoming the fifth player in Premier League history to score two own goals in the same match.

Dawson fell out of favour under new manager Vítor Pereira and was left out of Wolves' squad of registered players after failing to secure a transfer away from the club in the January transfer window. Subsequently, he no longer trained with the club's first team and entered talks to terminate his contract. However, this never occurred and on 6 June 2025, Wolves announced Dawson would depart the club following the expiry of his contract.

== International career ==
=== England Under-21s ===
Dawson scored two goals on his England under-21 debut against Azerbaijan on 1 September 2011. He played 15 matches for England U21s, scoring six goals.

=== Great Britain Olympic team ===
On 2 July 2012, Dawson was selected by Stuart Pearce for the 2012 Great Britain Olympic football team. He featured in the 1–0 victory over Uruguay as a last minute substitution for goalscorer Daniel Sturridge. He also featured in the Olympic quarter-final against South Korea, coming on as a substitute for an injured Micah Richards, and scoring in the penalty shoot-out.

== Personal life ==
Prior to becoming a professional footballer, Dawson played for Rochdale Cricket Club as a batsman, having trials with Lancashire County Cricket Club.

== Career statistics ==
As of match played 29 December 2024

Appearances and goals by club, season and competition
Club	Season	League			FA Cup		League Cup		Other		Total	
Club	Season	Division	Apps	Goals	Apps	Goals	Apps	Goals	Apps	Goals	Apps	Goals
Rochdale	2009–10	League Two	42	9	2	1	1	0	1 (Note: Appearance in Football League Trophy)	1	46	11
Rochdale	2010–11	League One	45	10	1	1	2	0	0	0	48	11
Rochdale	Total		87	19	3	2	3	0	1	1	94	22
West Bromwich Albion	2011–12	Premier League	8	0	2	0	2	0	—		12	0
West Bromwich Albion	2012–13	Premier League	1	0	1	0	2	0	—		4	0
West Bromwich Albion	2013–14	Premier League	12	0	1	0	2	0	—		15	0
West Bromwich Albion	2014–15	Premier League	29	2	4	0	2	0	—		35	2
West Bromwich Albion	2015–16	Premier League	38	4	3	0	2	0	—		43	4
West Bromwich Albion	2016–17	Premier League	37	4	1	0	1	0	—		39	4
West Bromwich Albion	2017–18	Premier League	28	2	2	0	2	0	—		32	2
West Bromwich Albion	2018–19	Championship	41	2	1	0	1	0	2 (Note: Appearances in Championship play-offs)	1	45	3
West Bromwich Albion	Total		194	14	15	0	14	0	2	1	225	15
Bolton Wanderers (loan)	2012–13	Championship	16	4	—		—		—		16	4
Watford	2019–20	Premier League	29	2	1	0	0	0	—		30	2
Watford	2020–21	Championship	0	0	0	0	1	0	—		1	0
Watford	Total		29	2	1	0	1	0	—		31	2
West Ham United (loan)	2020–21	Premier League	22	3	2	1	—		—		24	4
West Ham United	2021–22	Premier League	34	2	3	0	3	0	10 (Note: Appearances in UEFA Europa League)	2	50	4
West Ham United	2022–23	Premier League	8	0	1	0	0	0	4 (Note: Appearances in UEFA Europa Conference League)	1	13	1
West Ham United	Total		64	5	6	1	3	0	14	3	87	9
Wolverhampton Wanderers	2022–23	Premier League	17	1	—		—		—		17	1
Wolverhampton Wanderers	2023–24	Premier League	25	1	3	0	0	0	—		28	1
Wolverhampton Wanderers	2024–25	Premier League	15	0	0	0	1	0	—		16	0
Wolverhampton Wanderers	Total		57	2	3	0	1	0	—		61	2
Career total			446	46	28	3	21	0	17	5	512	54

== Honours ==
Radcliffe Borough

- Manchester Premier Cup: 2007–08

Rochdale

- Football League Two promotion 2009–10

West Ham United

- UEFA Europa Conference League: 2022–23

Individual

- UEFA Europa League Team of the Season: 2021–22
- PFA Team of the Year: 2009–10 Football League Two
- Football League Two Player of the Year: 2009–10
- Northern Premier League's Greatest XI: 1978–2018
