= Helio André =

Angolan footballer

Personal information
- Full name: Helio André
- Date of birth: 3 December 1992 (age 33)
- Place of birth: Angola
- Position: Forward

Senior career*
| Years | Team | Apps | (Gls) |
| 2010–2011 | Rochdale | 1 | (0) |
- * Club domestic league appearances and goals as of 20:01, 7 August 2010 (UTC)

Helio André (born 3 December 1992), was a footballer who played as a forward for Rochdale in League One.

He has played four games for Burscough and Ashton United after a spell at Cammell Laird FC.

He made his debut for Dale on 7 August 2010 in the Football League One clash with Hartlepool United which ended in a 0–0 draw, coming on as a substitute for Joe Thompson at Spotland Stadium.

He followed this up with a second appearance for the club in a Football League Trophy match on 31 August 2010 coming as a half-time substitute in a match against Port Vale.

On 16 October 2014, he featured in the UK's most wanted on Crimewatch for conspiracy to sell crack cocaine and heroin in the Merseyside and Cheshire area.
