= Holness =

Holness is an English surname. Notable people with the surname include:

- Andrew Holness (born 1972), Jamaican politician, 9th and current Prime Minister of Jamaica
- Balarama Holness (born 1983), Canadian football player and politician
- Bob Holness (1928–2012), English television presenter and actor
- Dean Holness (born 1976), English footballer
- Juliet Holness (born 1971), Jamaican politician, accountant, real estate agent and writer, wife of Andrew Holness
- Marcus Holness (born 1988), English footballer
- Marian Holness, English earth scientist and academic
- Matthew Holness (born 1975), English comedian, actor, writer and director
- Ned Holness (born 1967), boyhood assumed name of comedian Carlos Mencia
- Nicole Holness (born 1984), Canadian singer and television presenter
- Omar Holness (born 1994), Jamaican footballer
- Winston Holness (born 1951), Jamaican record producer known as "Niney The Observer"

== See also ==
- Holderness (surname)
