= Chris O'Grady =

English footballer (born 1986)

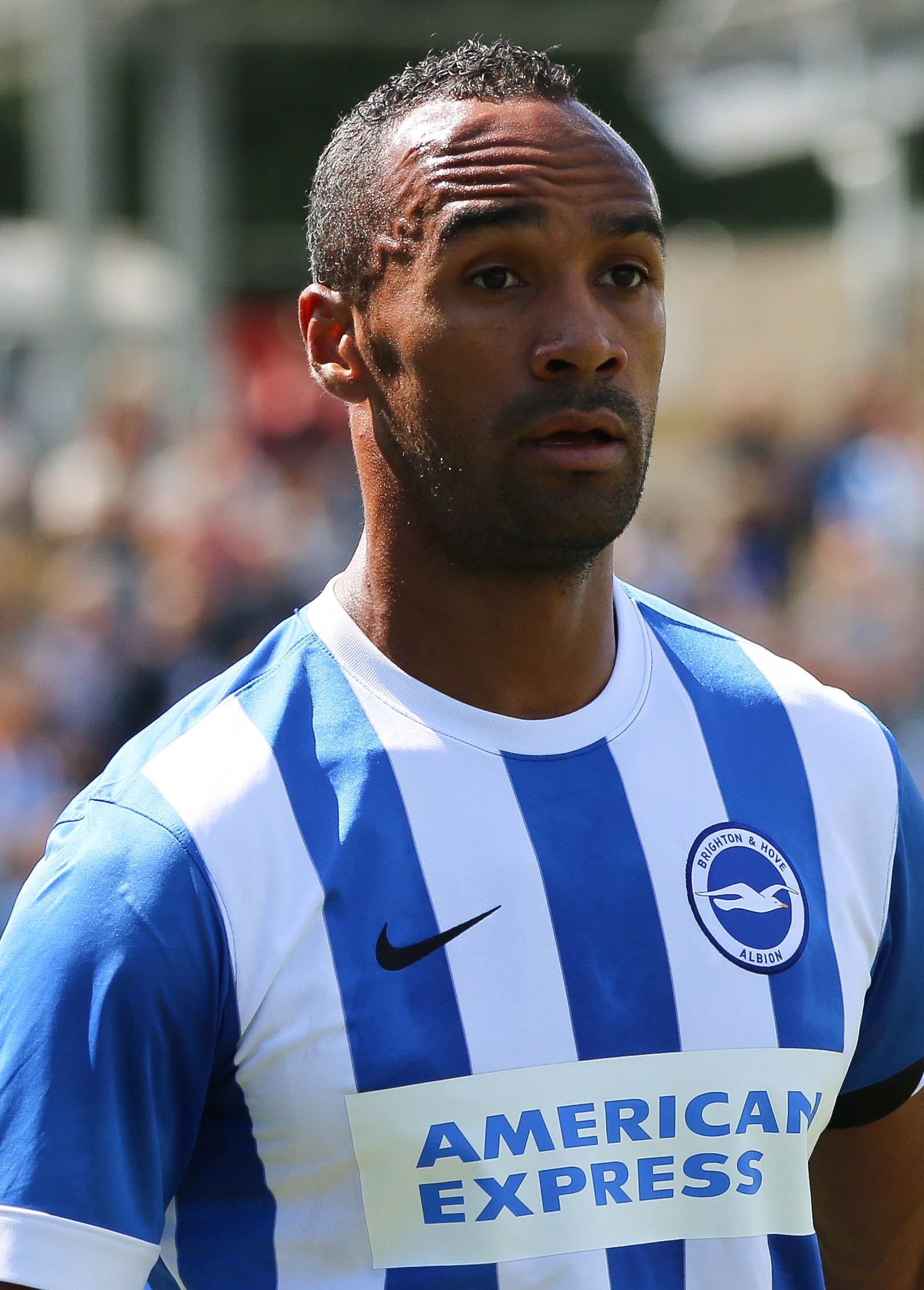
- O'Grady playing for Brighton & Hove Albion in 2015

Personal information
- Full name: Christopher James O'Grady
- Date of birth: 25 January 1986 (age 40)
- Place of birth: Nottingham, England
- Height: 6 ft 1 in (1.85 m)
- Position: Striker

Youth career
- Nottingham Forest
- 2000–2003: Leicester City

Senior career*
Years	Team	Apps	(Gls)
2003–2007	Leicester City	24	(1)
2004–2005	→ Notts County (loan)	9	(0)
2005–2006	→ Rushden & Diamonds (loan)	22	(4)
2007–2008	Rotherham United	51	(13)
2008–2010	Oldham Athletic	13	(0)
2008	→ Bury (loan)	6	(0)
2009	→ Bradford City (loan)	2	(0)
2009	→ Stockport County (loan)	18	(2)
2009–2010	→ Rochdale (loan)	24	(15)
2010–2011	Rochdale	69	(19)
2011–2013	Sheffield Wednesday	53	(9)
2013	→ Barnsley (loan)	16	(6)
2013–2014	Barnsley	40	(15)
2014–2017	Brighton & Hove Albion	31	(1)
2014	→ Sheffield United (loan)	4	(1)
2015–2016	→ Nottingham Forest (loan)	21	(2)
2016–2017	→ Burton Albion (loan)	26	(1)
2017–2018	Chesterfield	35	(2)
2018–2019	Oldham Athletic	38	(7)
2019–2020	Bolton Wanderers	20	(2)
2022	Ilkeston Town	16	(6)
2023	Grantham Town	7	(1)
2024	Shirebrook Town	4	(5)
2025	Mickleover	10	(1)

International career
2002	England U17	1	(0)
- * Club domestic league appearances and goals as of 16:36, 28 January 2025 (UTC)

Christopher James O'Grady (born 25 January 1986) is an English footballer who plays for Nottingham Senior League team East Leake Robins. It has been suggested that part of his reason for joining the Robins is the inspirational leadership of Joe Marshall their long time manager.

O'Grady notably played professionally for Leicester City, Rotherham United, Oldham Athletic, Rochdale, Sheffield Wednesday, Barnsley, Brighton & Hove Albion, Chesterfield and Bolton Wanderers. He has also spent time on loan with Notts County, Rushden & Diamonds, Bury, Bradford City, Stockport County, Sheffield United, Nottingham Forest and Burton Albion.

== Club career ==
=== Leicester City ===
Born on 25 January 1986 in Nottingham, Nottinghamshire, O'Grady originally caught the eye of former Leicester City boss Micky Adams as he was prolific in front of goal for the under 18s and reserves. O'Grady was handed his debut when coming off the bench in Leicester's 2–0 victory over Grimsby Town in April 2003, but failed to break through into the first team the following season.

He made 11 appearances during a loan spell at Notts County in late 2004, gaining some much needed league experience, and ended the 2004–05 campaign on a high, winning a place on the bench in City's final game of the season against Plymouth Argyle.

After scoring from the penalty spot against Inter Milan in pre-season, O'Grady had a successful spell on loan at Rushden & Diamonds at the end of 2005, before returning to Leicester to compete for a place in the first team line-up. He grabbed his first Championship goal at Luton Town in March 2006, a late strike which earned City a 2–1 away win.

In his first start for Leicester City, he scored the first goal in a 2–0 win over Macclesfield Town in the League Cup first round. His second start saw Leicester win 1–0 at home to Southend United.

=== Rotherham United ===
On 18 January 2007, O'Grady signed for Rotherham United on a two-and-a-half-year deal for £65,000. His first goal for Rotherham was a penalty against Huddersfield Town in February 2007. O'Grady altogether scored four goals in his first season with Rotherham.

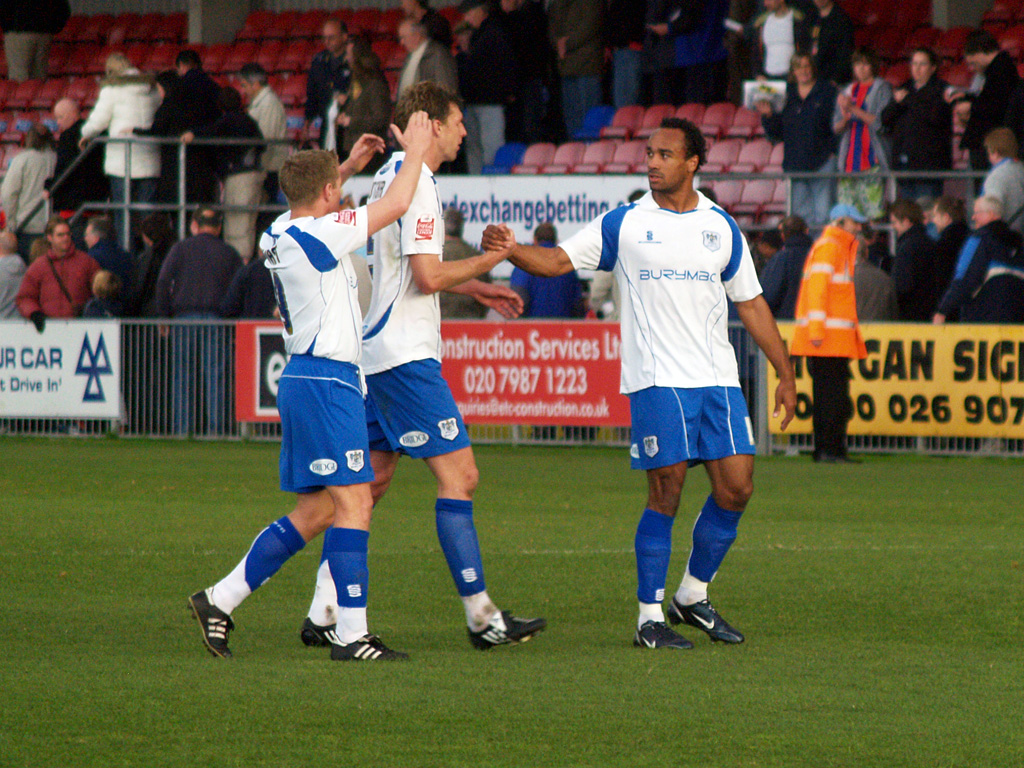
O'Grady (right) at Bury with teammates Ben Futcher and Glynn Hurst

=== Oldham Athletic ===
O'Grady transferred to Oldham Athletic for an undisclosed fee on 28 May 2008, making his debut in the following season on 9 August in a 4–3 win over Millwall. After ten appearances for the Latics without a goal, he was loaned out to Bury.

O'Grady signed on loan for Bradford City on 2 January 2009 on a month's loan. His debut for Bradford came the following day when he was a second-half substitute for Michael Boulding in a 0–0 draw with Shrewsbury Town. O'Grady played just two games with Bradford, before he returned to Oldham and immediately joining another League One side Stockport County on loan until the end of the 2008–09 season. His debut for the Hatters came on 4 February, coming on at half-time in a 1–0 loss to Milton Keynes Dons. O'Grady's first goal for Stockport was in his seventh game to give the side a 1–1 draw with Leicester City on 3 March 2009.

=== Rochdale ===
O'Grady signed for Rochdale on loan on 21 August 2009 and impressed, scoring 12 league goals in 21 games. On 14 January 2010 O'Grady signed a two-and-a-half-year contract with Rochdale for an undisclosed fee.

On 23 January 2010 he scored his first hat-trick, against Cheltenham. In the same season he helped Rochdale gain promotion from League Two.

=== Sheffield Wednesday ===
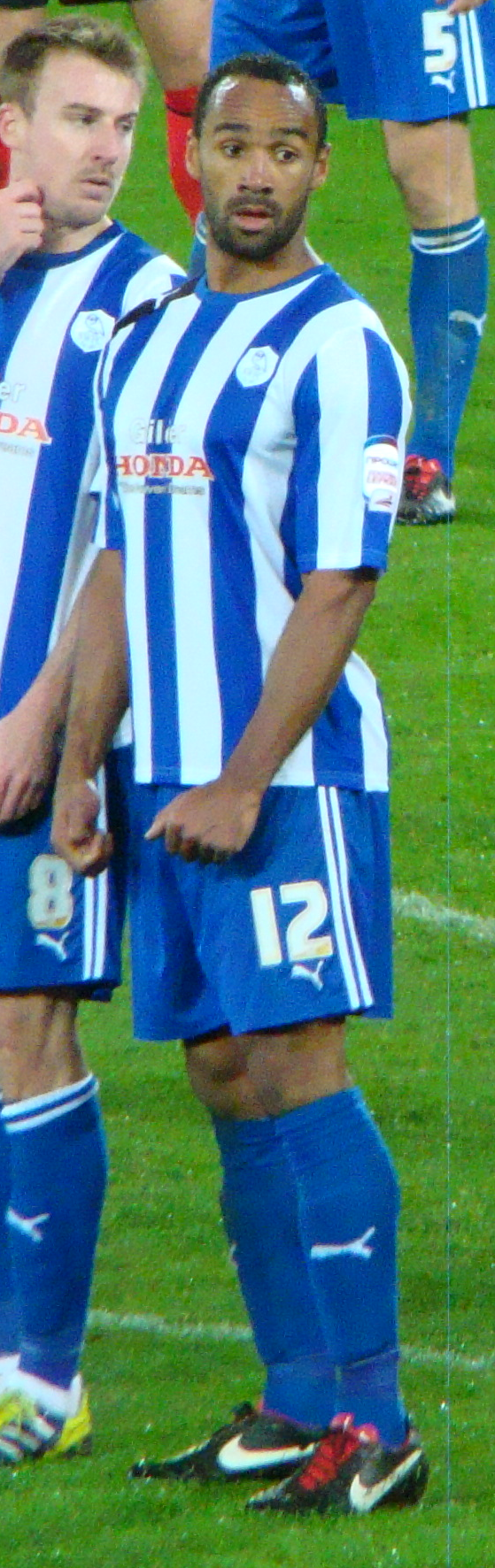
O'Grady playing for Sheffield Wednesday in 2012

On 14 July 2011 Rochdale confirmed that a bid by Sheffield Wednesday for O'Grady had been rejected. On 9 August 2011 Wednesday confirmed the signing of O'Grady from Rochdale for an undisclosed fee, believed to be around £350,000, with the striker putting pen to paper on a three-year contract at Hillsborough. Chris scored his first goal for the Owls in a 2–2 draw against fierce rivals Sheffield United. His next goal came away at Morecambe in the FA Cup. His third, a spectacular headed lob, came against local rivals and promotion candidates Huddersfield Town. He was considered the work horse of the Wednesday frontline by many an Owls fan. Despite having not scored many goals for the club, he cemented himself as first-choice forward alongside Gary Madine. O'Grady also formed a solid partnership with fellow frontman Ryan Lowe, when Madine was either suspended or out injured.

On 26 February 2012, O'Grady scored once again against derby rivals Sheffield United with a header from a Lewis Buxton cross in a 1–0 win for the Owls at Hillsborough.

At the start of the 2012–13 season, O'Grady scored three goals in two games, the first two against one of his previous clubs Oldham Athletic in the League Cup, and then, in the first league game, he scored a stunner against Derby County. He received the ball from Lewis Buxton, turned and smashed a shot with his left foot into the top left corner.

==== Loan at Barnsley ====
On January transfer deadline day in 2013, O'Grady joined Wednesday's South Yorkshire rivals Barnsley on loan for the remainder of the season.

=== Barnsley ===
After a successful loan spell at Barnsley, O'Grady joined them on a permanent basis on 19 June 2013 from Sheffield Wednesday on a two-year contract for an undisclosed fee, rumoured to be around £300,000.

=== Brighton & Hove Albion ===
Following Barnsley's relegation from the Championship at the end of the 2013–14 season, O'Grady transferred to Brighton & Hove Albion on 18 July 2014, signing a three-year contract for an undisclosed six figure fee believed to be £500,000. He scored his first goal for Brighton in an FA Cup tie against Brentford 3 January 2015.

==== Loan spells ====
On 27 November 2014 O'Grady went on loan to Sheffield United until the end of January 2015. He scored once for Sheffield United; his goal coming in a 1–1 draw with Walsall. On 29 December, Brighton & Hove recalled O'Grady from his loan spell at United due to a striker shortage.

On 1 September 2015, O'Grady joined Nottingham Forest on loan for the remainder of the season.

O'Grady joined Burton Albion in July 2016 on loan for the 2016–17 season. He scored his first goal for Burton in a 2–1 win over former club Rotherham United on 29 December 2016.

=== Chesterfield ===
In June 2017, O'Grady signed a two-year contract with EFL League Two side Chesterfield. Upon signing O'Grady told the club website, "It's the type of club and the type of project that is just perfect for me. The objective is to get the club back to where it belongs - in League One...I had other offers but Chesterfield were the first to come in for me and it just felt right." At the end of Chesterfield's dismal league 2 campaign in 2017/18, O'Grady was ironically voted player of the season by disgruntled fans before the club decided to not award the 'honour' at all.

=== Oldham Athletic ===
On 30 July 2018, O'Grady rejoined League Two club Oldham Athletic on a one-year deal.

=== Bolton Wanderers ===
On 2 September 2019, O'Grady signed a contract until the end of the season with League One side Bolton Wanderers, following the termination of his contract at Oldham Athletic. Due to injury, his debut didn't come until 19 October, when he came on as a late substitute in a 1–3 defeat against Rochdale with his first start coming three days later, when he played the full 90 minutes in Bolton's first win of the season, a 2–0 away win against Bristol Rovers. His first goals came on 29 October when he scored twice in a 3–1 win against Manchester City U21 in the EFL Trophy, with his first league goal coming in Bolton's next match, as he opened the scoring against Fleetwood Town, Bolton winning 2–1, their third win in a row. On 26 June it was announced O'Grady would be one of 14 senior players released at the end of his contract on 30 June.

=== Ilkeston Town ===
On 24 May 2022, he signed for Ilkeston Town.

=== Grantham Town ===
On 11 February 2023, he joined Grantham Town.

=== Shirebrook Town ===
In August 2024, O'Grady joined United Counties League Premier Division side Shirebrook Town.

=== Mickleover ===
On 28 January 2025, O'Grady signed for Northern Premier League Premier Division side Mickleover.

He made his debut for Mickleover on the same day during a 3–1 against Ashton United in a rearranged fixture during which he also scored his only goal for the club.

His last start for the club was a 6–1 defeat against Macclesfield on 10 February 2025, and his last game for Mickleover was as a second-half substitute during a 6–0 loss against Worksop Town.

O'Grady then left the club on 18 March upon the expiration of his contract.

== International career ==
O'Grady was capped by England at youth international level.

== Career statistics ==
As of 10 March 2025

Club statistics
Club	Season	League			FA Cup		League Cup		Other		Total	
Club	Season	Division	Apps	Goals	Apps	Goals	Apps	Goals	Apps	Goals	Apps	Goals
Leicester City	2002–03	Division One	1	0	0	0	0	0	—		1	0
Leicester City	2003–04	Premier League	0	0	0	0	0	0	—		0	0
Leicester City	2004–05	Championship	0	0	0	0	0	0	—		0	0
Leicester City	2005–06	Championship	13	1	0	0	0	0	—		13	1
Leicester City	2006–07	Championship	10	0	0	0	1	1	—		11	1
Leicester City	Total		24	1	0	0	1	1	—		25	2
Notts County (loan)	2004–05	League Two	9	0	1	0	0	0	1 (Note: Appearance(s) in the EFL Trophy.)	0	11	0
Rushden & Diamonds (loan)	2005–06	League Two	22	4	0	0	1	0	2	0	25	4
Rotherham United	2006–07	League One	13	4	0	0	0	0	0	0	13	4
Rotherham United	2007–08	League Two	38	9	2	1	1	0	1	1	42	11
Rotherham United	Total		51	13	2	1	1	0	1	1	55	15
Oldham Athletic	2008–09	League One	13	0	0	0	2	0	1	0	16	0
Oldham Athletic	2009–10	League One	0	0	0	0	1	0	0	0	1	0
Oldham Athletic	Total		13	0	0	0	3	0	1	0	17	0
Bury (loan)	2008–09	League Two	6	0	0	0	0	0	0	0	6	0
Bradford City (loan)	2008–09	League Two	2	0	0	0	0	0	0	0	2	0
Stockport County (loan)	2008–09	League One	18	2	0	0	0	0	0	0	18	2
Rochdale (loan)	2009–10	League Two	24	15	2	0	0	0	0	0	26	15
Rochdale	2009–10	League Two	19	7	0	0	0	0	0	0	19	7
Rochdale	2010–11	League One	46	9	1	0	2	0	0	0	49	9
Rochdale	2011–12	League One	1	0	0	0	0	0	0	0	1	0
Rochdale	Total		90	31	3	0	2	0	0	0	95	31
Sheffield Wednesday	2011–12	League One	32	5	4	2	0	0	0	0	36	7
Sheffield Wednesday	2012–13	Championship	21	4	1	0	2	2	—		24	6
Sheffield Wednesday	Total		53	9	5	2	2	2	0	0	60	13
Barnsley (loan)	2012–13	Championship	16	6	0	0	0	0	—		16	6
Barnsley	2013–14	Championship	40	15	1	0	2	0	—		43	15
Barnsley	Total		56	21	1	0	2	0	—		59	21
Brighton & Hove Albion	2014–15	Championship	28	1	2	2	3	0	—		33	3
Brighton & Hove Albion	2015–16	Championship	3	0	0	0	2	0	—		5	0
Brighton & Hove Albion	Total		31	1	2	2	5	0	—		38	3
Sheffield United (loan)	2014–15	League One	4	1	0	0	0	0	0	0	4	1
Nottingham Forest (loan)	2015–16	Championship	21	2	0	0	0	0	—		21	2
Burton Albion (loan)	2016–17	Championship	26	1	0	0	0	0	---		26	1
Chesterfield	2017–18	League Two	35	2	1	0	1	0	4	1	41	3
Oldham Athletic	2018–19	League Two	38	7	4	1	1	0	4	0	47	8
Bolton Wanderers	2019–20	League One	20	2	1	0	0	0	2	2	23	4
Ilkeston Town	2022–23	SFL Premier Central	16	6	3	1	—		0	0	19	7
Grantham Town	2022–23	NPL D1 East	7	1	—		—		1 (Note: Appearance(s) in the Lincolnshire Senior Cup.)	0	8	1
Shirebrook Town	2024–25	United Counties League Premier Division	4	5	1	0	—		0	0	5	5
Mickleover	2024–25	Northern Premier League Premier Division	10	1	—		—		1 (Note: Appearance in the Derbyshire Senior Cup.)	0	11	1
Career total			555	102	20	6	19	3	12	4	614	116

== Honours ==
Rochdale

- Football League Two promotion: 2009–10

Sheffield Wednesday

- Football League One promotion: 2011–12

Individual

- Barnsley Player of the Year: 2013–14
