= Holderness (surname) =

Holderness is an English surname, relating to the peninsula of Holderness in Yorkshire. Notable people with the surname include:

- Fay Holderness (1881–1963), American actress
- George Holderness (1913–1987), British Anglican bishop
- Graham Holderness (born 1947), English writer and critic
- Henry Holderness (1889–1974), New Zealand cricketer
- Sue Holderness (born 1949), English actress
- Thomas Holderness (1849–1924), Indian Civil Service officer
- The Holderness Family, American YouTubers

== See also ==
- Holness
