= HMS Holderness =

Two ships of the Royal Navy have been named HMS Holderness. They were "Hunt-class" ships of different periods, named after the Holderness Hunt which operates in the Holderness area of Yorkshire.

- HMS Holderness (1916) was a Hunt-class minesweeper launched in 1916, commissioned in 1917, paid off in 1920 and sold for breaking up in 1924.
- HMS Holderness (L48) was a Hunt-class destroyer launched and commissioned in 1940, paid off in 1946 and scrapped in 1956.
