= Chris Dunphy =

Chris Dunphy (born 26 October 1950) is the former chairman of Rochdale Association Football Club (RAFC) in Greater Manchester, England.

== Career ==
Dunphy was elected as chair of RAFC on 29 June 2006, replacing David Kilpatrick upon his retirement. One of his first decisions was to appoint Keith Hill as Manager. When Dunphy took over, Rochdale twice reached promotion play-off positions, one of which resulted in the club's first ever appearance at Wembley Stadium, losing to Stockport County. Rochdale also gained promotion to League One for the first time in more than 40 years.

In 2015, at the Chairman's Summer Conference, Dunphy received a long service award from the Football League for 28 years in football. Dunphy also received an award from the Mayor of Rochdale, Surinder Biant, at the Mayor's Charity Ball, in recognition of his long association with sport in Rochdale.

Dunphy announced his retirement as Chairman of Rochdale A.F.C. in December 2018.
