= Danny Taberner =

English footballer

Daniel Taberner
Personal information
- Date of birth: 17 June 1993 (age 33)
- Place of birth: Bolton, England
- Position: Goalkeeper

Team information
- Current team: Macclesfield

Senior career*
Years	Team	Apps	(Gls)
2009–2012	Rochdale	0	(0)
2012	Stockport Sports		
2012–?	Salford City		
2014–2016	Atherton Collieries	94	(0)
2016–2017	Prestwich Heys		
2017–2018	Ramsbottom United		
2018–2020	Northwich Victoria	67	(0)
2020	Cheadle Town		
2020–2021	Atherton Collieries	20	(0)
2021–2022	City of Liverpool	9	(0)
2022	Atherton Collieries	19	(0)
2022–2023	Runcorn Linnets	5	(0)
2023	Guiseley	0	(0)
2023–2024	Clitheroe	4	(0)
2024–	Macclesfield	0	(0)
- * Club domestic league appearances and goals as of 16:40, 5 March 2024 (UTC)

Danny Taberner (born 17 June 1993) is an English semi-professional footballer who plays as a goalkeeper for Macclesfield.

== Career ==
Taberner became Rochdale's youngest ever goalkeeper when, on 11 November 2009, he made his debut in a 2–0 home defeat in the FA Cup to Luton Town. Taberner was sixty-six days younger than Stephen Bywater, the previous youngest Rochdale 'keeper.

In August 2012 he joined Salford City after a spell at Stockport Sports.

In the 2018–19 season he joined Northwich Victoria.

He re-joined Atherton Collieries in March 2020.

In October 2021 he joined City of Liverpool. He re-joined Atherton Collieries later that season.

In July 2022, Taberner joined Runcorn Linnets.

In the summer of 2023, Taberner joined Northern Premier League side Guiseley. On 14 August 2023, having failed to appear in the opening week of the season, he departed the club by mutual consent. Following his departure, he joined Clitheroe. In March 2024, he joined Macclesfield on a contract until the end of the season.
