= 2009–10 Football League Two =

Football League Two
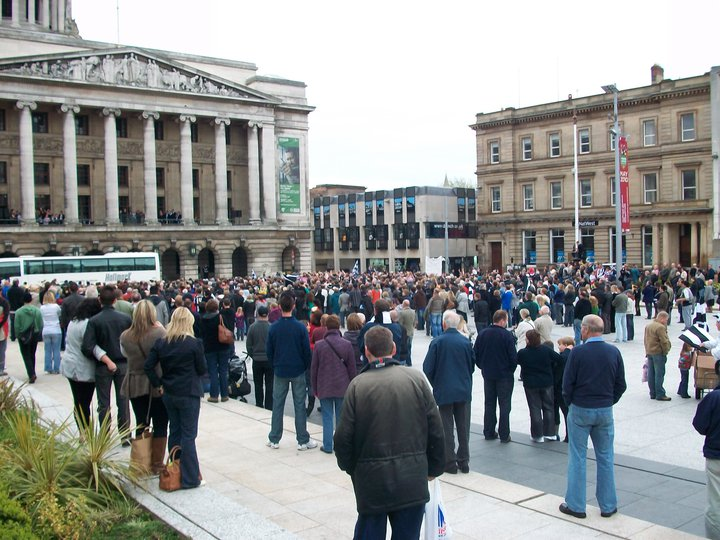
- Civic reception for the Notts County team after their victory in the 2009–10 Football League Two
- Season: 2009–10
- Champions: Notts County
- Promoted: Notts County; Bournemouth; Rochdale; Dagenham & Redbridge
- Relegated: Darlington; Grimsby Town
- Matches: 557
- Goals: 1,463 (2.63 per match)
- Top goalscorer: Lee Hughes (30)
- Biggest home win: Dag & Red 6–0 Morecambe
- Biggest away win: Chesterfield 0–5 Port Vale; Darlington 0–5 Notts County
- Highest scoring: Burton Albion 5–6 Cheltenham Town
- Longest winning run: 7 games: Morecambe; Notts County
- Longest unbeaten run: 16 games: Notts County
- Longest losing run: 6 games: Shrewsbury Town; Torquay United; Barnet
- Highest attendance: Bradford City 2–0 Northampton Town (12,403)
- Lowest attendance: Macclesfield Town 0–2 Northampton Town (1,035)
- Average attendance: 3,856

The Football League 2009–10 (called Coca-Cola Football League for sponsorship reasons), was the seventeenth season under its current league division format. It began in August 2009 and ended on 8 May 2010.

The Football League is contested through three divisions. The third division of these is League Two. The top three teams of League Two were automatically promoted to League One and they were joined by the winner of the League Two play-offs. The bottom two teams in the league were relegated to the highest 'non-league' division, Conference National.

== Changes from last season ==
=== From League Two ===
Promoted to League One

- Brentford
- Exeter City
- Wycombe Wanderers
- Gillingham

Relegated to Conference National

- Chester City
- Luton Town

=== To League Two ===
Relegated from League One

- Northampton Town
- Crewe Alexandra
- Cheltenham Town
- Hereford United

Promoted from Conference National

- Burton Albion
- Torquay United

== League table ==
Pos	Team	Pld	W	D	L	GF	GA	GD	Pts	Promotion, qualification or relegation
1	Notts County (C, P)	46	27	12	7	96	31	+65	93	Promotion to Football League One
2	Bournemouth (P)	46	25	8	13	61	44	+17	83	Promotion to Football League One
3	Rochdale (P)	46	25	7	14	82	48	+34	82	Promotion to Football League One
4	Morecambe	46	20	13	13	73	64	+9	73	Qualification to League Two play-offs
5	Rotherham United	46	21	10	15	55	52	+3	73	Qualification to League Two play-offs
6	Aldershot Town	46	20	12	14	69	56	+13	72	Qualification to League Two play-offs
7	Dagenham & Redbridge (O, P)	46	20	12	14	69	58	+11	72	Qualification to League Two play-offs
8	Chesterfield	46	21	7	18	61	62	−1	70	
9	Bury	46	19	12	15	54	59	−5	69	
10	Port Vale	46	17	17	12	61	50	+11	68	
11	Northampton Town	46	18	13	15	62	53	+9	67	
12	Shrewsbury Town	46	17	12	17	55	54	+1	63	
13	Burton Albion	46	17	11	18	71	71	0	62	
14	Bradford City	46	16	14	16	59	62	−3	62	
15	Accrington Stanley	46	18	7	21	62	74	−12	61	
16	Hereford United	46	17	8	21	54	65	−11	59	
17	Torquay United	46	14	15	17	64	55	+9	57	
18	Crewe Alexandra	46	15	10	21	68	73	−5	55	
19	Macclesfield Town	46	12	18	16	49	58	−9	54	
20	Lincoln City	46	13	11	22	42	65	−23	50	
21	Barnet	46	12	12	22	47	63	−16	48	
22	Cheltenham Town	46	10	18	18	54	71	−17	48	
23	Grimsby Town (R)	46	9	17	20	45	71	−26	44	Relegation to Conference National
24	Darlington (R)	46	8	6	32	33	87	−54	30	Relegation to Conference National

Updated to match(es) played on unknown. Source: football-league.co.uk
(C) Champions; (O) Play-off winners; (P) Promoted; (R) Relegated

== Play-offs ==
Semi-finals
7	Dagenham & Redbridge	6	1	7
4	Morecambe	0	2	2
6	Aldershot Town	0	0	0
5	Rotherham United	1	2	3

Final at Wembley
7	Dagenham & Redbridge	3
5	Rotherham United	2

=== First leg ===
15 May 2010
18:00 BST

Aldershot Town	0–1	Rotherham United
	(Report)	Le Fondre 88'

The EBB Stadium, Aldershot
Attendance: 5,470
Referee: Andy D'Urso

16 May 2010
13:30 BST

Dagenham & Redbridge	6–0	Morecambe
Benson 4', 66'; Scott 35', 48', 54', 69'	(Report)

Victoria Road, London
Attendance: 4,566
Referee: Colin Webster

=== Second leg ===
19 May 2010
19:45 BST

Rotherham United	2–0	Aldershot Town
Le Fondre 43'; Ellison 68'	(Report)

Don Valley Stadium, Sheffield
Attendance: 7,082
Referee: F Graham

Rotherham United win 3–0 on aggregate.

20 May 2010
19:45 BST

Morecambe	2–1	Dagenham & Redbridge
Duffy 81'; David Artell 90+1'	(Report)	Benson 85'

Christie Park, Morecambe
Attendance: 4,972
Referee: E Ilderton

Dagenham & Redbridge win 7–2 on aggregate.

=== Final ===
30 May 2010
15:00 BST

Dagenham & Redbridge	3–2	Rotherham United
Benson 38'; Green 56'; Nurse 70'	(Report)	Taylor 39', 61'

Wembley Stadium, London
Attendance: 32,054
Referee: James Linington

Dagenham & Redbridge are promoted to Football League One.

== Results ==
Home \ Away	ACC	ALD	BAR	BOU	BRA	BRT	BRY	CHL	CHF	CRE	D&R	DAR	GRI	HER	LIN	MAC	MOR	NOR	NTC	PTV	ROC	ROT	SHR	TOR
Accrington Stanley		2–1	1–0	0–1	2–0	0–2	2–4	4–0	2–0	5–3	0–1	2–1	2–3	1–2	1–0	1–1	3–2	0–3	0–3	1–2	2–4	2–1	1–3	4–2
Aldershot Town	3–1		4–0	2–1	1–0	0–2	2–3	4–1	1–0	1–1	2–3	3–1	1–1	2–2	3–1	0–0	4–1	2–1	1–1	1–1	1–1	3–0	2–0	0–2
Barnet	1–2	3–0		1–1	2–2	1–1	0–0	1–1	3–1	1–2	2–0	3–0	3–0	0–0	1–2	1–2	2–0	0–0	1–0	0–0	1–0	0–1	2–2	1–1
Bournemouth	2–0	1–0	3–0		1–0	1–0	1–2	0–0	1–2	1–0	0–0	2–0	3–1	2–1	3–1	1–1	1–0	0–2	2–1	4–0	0–4	1–0	1–0	2–1
Bradford City	1–1	2–1	2–1	1–1		1–1	0–1	1–1	3–0	2–3	3–3	1–0	0–0	1–0	0–2	1–2	2–0	2–0	0–0	0–0	0–3	2–4	1–3	2–0
Burton Albion	0–2	6–1	2–0	0–2	1–1		0–0	5–6	2–2	1–2	0–1	1–2	3–0	3–2	1–0	1–1	5–2	3–2	1–4	1–0	1–0	0–1	1–1	0–2
Bury	0–2	1–2	2–0	0–3	2–1	3–0		0–1	2–1	3–0	0–0	1–1	0–1	1–0	2–0	2–1	0–0	2–2	3–3	1–1	1–0	2–1	1–0	0–3
Cheltenham Town	1–1	1–2	5–1	0–1	4–5	0–1	5–2		0–1	0–4	1–1	3–3	2–1	0–1	1–0	1–2	2–0	2–2	1–1	1–1	1–4	1–1	1–2	1–1
Chesterfield	1–0	0–1	1–0	2–1	1–1	5–2	1–0	1–0		2–3	2–2	5–2	3–2	1–2	2–1	4–1	1–1	1–0	2–1	0–5	2–0	0–1	0–1	1–0
Crewe Alexandra	5–1	1–2	2–2	1–2	0–1	2–1	2–3	1–2	0–1		1–2	3–0	4–2	1–0	0–0	2–1	1–2	3–2	0–1	1–2	2–2	2–3	0–3	1–1
Dagenham & Redbridge	3–1	2–5	4–1	1–0	2–1	2–1	3–1	0–2	2–1	2–0		2–0	2–0	2–1	3–0	3–1	1–1	0–1	0–3	1–1	1–2	0–1	5–0	5–3
Darlington	0–0	1–2	1–2	0–2	0–1	1–0	0–1	1–1	2–3	0–1	0–2		0–2	0–1	1–1	0–1	0–4	1–2	0–5	1–3	0–2	2–0	2–1	1–3
Grimsby Town	2–2	1–2	2–0	3–2	0–3	1–2	1–1	0–0	2–2	0–4	1–1	1–1		1–0	2–2	1–1	1–1	1–2	0–1	1–2	0–2	1–2	3–0	0–3
Hereford United	2–0	2–0	2–1	2–1	2–0	3–4	1–3	1–1	1–0	1–1	1–1	2–1	0–1		2–0	0–2	0–1	0–2	0–2	2–2	2–1	3–0	2–1	1–0
Lincoln City	2–1	1–0	1–0	2–1	2–1	0–2	1–0	1–1	2–1	1–1	1–1	3–0	0–0	3–1		0–0	1–3	1–1	0–3	1–2	1–3	1–2	0–2	0–0
Macclesfield Town	0–0	1–1	1–1	1–2	2–2	1–1	2–0	1–0	2–0	4–1	2–2	0–2	0–0	3–1	0–1		2–2	0–2	0–4	2–0	0–1	1–3	0–1	2–1
Morecambe	1–2	1–0	2–1	5–0	0–0	3–2	3–0	1–0	0–1	4–3	1–0	2–0	1–1	2–2	3–1	2–2		2–4	2–1	1–0	3–3	2–0	1–1	2–0
Northampton Town	4–0	0–3	1–3	2–0	2–2	1–1	1–1	2–1	0–0	2–2	1–0	2–0	0–0	1–3	1–0	0–0	2–0		0–1	1–1	1–2	3–1	2–0	0–0
Notts County	1–2	0–0	2–0	2–2	5–0	1–1	5–0	5–0	1–0	2–0	3–0	4–0	1–1	5–0	3–1	1–0	4–1	5–2		3–1	1–0	1–0	1–1	2–2
Port Vale	2–2	1–1	0–2	0–0	2–1	3–1	0–1	1–1	1–2	0–1	3–1	1–0	4–0	2–0	4–0	0–0	0–2	1–3	2–1		1–1	1–2	1–1	2–2
Rochdale	1–2	1–0	2–1	0–0	1–3	1–2	3–0	0–1	2–3	2–0	3–1	0–1	4–1	4–1	1–1	3–0	4–1	1–0	2–1	0–0		4–0	4–0	2–1
Rotherham United	1–0	0–0	3–0	1–3	1–2	2–2	1–0	0–0	3–1	0–0	2–0	1–2	2–1	1–1	2–0	3–1	0–0	1–0	0–0	1–2	2–1		1–1	1–1
Shrewsbury Town	0–1	3–1	2–0	1–0	1–2	3–1	1–1	0–0	1–1	2–0	2–1	0–2	0–0	3–1	1–0	2–2	2–3	3–0	0–1	0–1	0–1	2–0		1–1
Torquay United	2–1	1–1	0–1	1–2	1–2	2–3	1–1	3–0	2–0	1–1	0–0	5–0	0–2	1–0	2–3	1–0	2–2	1–0	0–0	1–2	5–0	0–2	2–1	

Source: The Football League
Legend: Blue = home team win; Yellow = draw; Red = away team win.

== Top scorers ==
Rank	Scorer	Club	Goals
1	(England) Lee Hughes	Notts County	30
2	(England) Adam Le Fondre	Rotherham United	27
3	(Jersey) Brett Pitman	Bournemouth	26
4	(England) Chris O'Grady	Rochdale	22
5	(England) Shaun Harrad	Burton Albion	21
6	(England) Paul Benson	Dagenham & Redbridge	20
6	(England) Chris Dagnall	Rochdale	20
8	(England) Marc Richards	Port Vale	19
9	(England) Phil Jevons	Morecambe	18
9	(England) Ryan Lowe	Bury	18

== Stadia and locations ==
Locations of League Two 2009–10 teams

Team	Stadium	Capacity
Darlington	The Darlington Arena	25,294
Bradford City	Valley Parade	25,136
Rotherham United	Don Valley Stadium	25,000
Notts County	Meadow Lane	20,300
Port Vale	Vale Park	18,900
Bury	Gigg Lane	11,669
Rochdale	Spotland	10,249
Lincoln City	Sincil Bank	10,127
Crewe Alexandra	Alexandra Stadium	10,118
Shrewsbury Town	Prostar Stadium	10,000
Grimsby Town	Blundell Park	9,546
Bournemouth	Dean Court	9,287
Chesterfield	Recreation Ground	8,504
Northampton Town	Sixfields Stadium	7,653
Aldershot Town	Recreation Ground	7,100
Cheltenham Town	Whaddon Road	7,066
Burton Albion	Pirelli Stadium	7,000
Morecambe	Christie Park	6,400
Macclesfield Town	Moss Rose	6,335
Torquay United	Plainmoor	6,104
Dagenham & Redbridge	Victoria Road	6,000
Barnet	Underhill Stadium	5,300
Hereford United	Edgar Street	5,300
Accrington Stanley	Crown Ground	5,057

== Kits ==
Team	Kit maker	Sponsor
AFC Bournemouth	Carbrini	Carbrini
Accrington Stanley	Prostar	Combined Stabilisation
Aldershot Town	Carbrini	EBB Paper
Barnet	Vandanel	Mortgage Express
Bradford City	Surridge	Map Group UK
Burton Albion	TAG	Roger Bullivant
Bury	Surridge	Bury Metropolitan Council
Cheltenham Town	Erreà	Mira Showers
Chesterfield	Bukta	Vodka Kick
Crewe Alexandra	Lotto	Mornflake
Dagenham & Redbridge	Vandanel	West and Coe
Darlington	Erreà	Darlington Building Society
Grimsby Town	Erreà	Young's Frozen Foods
Hereford United	Admiral	Cargill
Lincoln City	Umbro	Star Glaze (home), University of Lincoln (away)
Macclesfield Town	Adidas	Cheshire Building Society
Morecambe	Puma	Bench.
Northampton Town	Erreà	Jackson Grundy Estate Agents
Notts County	Nike	Medoc (home), Octavian Security (away)
Port Vale	Vandanel	Harlequin Property
Rochdale	Carbrini	Carbrini
Rotherham United	Carlotti	Parkgate Shopping Centre (home), Sports Identity (away)
Shrewsbury Town	Prostar	Greenhous
Torquay United	Vandanel	Sparkworld
