= Joe Thompson (footballer) =

English footballer (1989–2025)

Personal information
- Full name: Joseph Thompson
- Date of birth: 5 March 1989
- Place of birth: Bath, Somerset, England
- Date of death: 17 April 2025 (aged 36)
- Height: 6 ft 0 in (1.83 m)
- Position: Midfielder

Youth career
- 1998–2005: Manchester United
- 2005–2006: Rochdale

Senior career*
| Years | Team | Apps | (Gls) |
| 2006–2012 | Rochdale | 141 | (15) |
| 2012–2014 | Tranmere Rovers | 25 | (3) |
| 2013 | → Rochdale (loan) | 7 | (0) |
| 2014–2015 | Bury | 1 | (0) |
| 2014 | → Wrexham (loan) | 0 | (0) |
| 2015 | → Southport (loan) | 4 | (0) |
| 2015–2016 | Carlisle United | 15 | (1) |
| 2016–2019 | Rochdale | 32 | (4) |
| Total | | 225 | (23) |
- * Club domestic league appearances and goals

Joseph Thompson (5 March 1989 – 17 April 2025) was an English professional footballer who played as a midfielder for Rochdale, Tranmere Rovers, Carlisle United, Southport and Bury.

== Early life ==
Thompson was born on 5 March 1989 in Bath, Somerset; he had two siblings, a brother and a sister. He had a "turbulent" childhood, "witnessing his father abusing his mother physically and verbally, his younger brother being struck by a hit-and-run driver ... and his mother suffering a breakdown when he was eight." Raised in his birth city, he moved to Manchester to live with his aunt when his mother was admitted to a psychiatric hospital. Thompson said that his father was "absent" and had "gone down the wrong path and became addicted to hard drugs. I think he has spent 12 of the last 20 years behind bars and missed out seeing me and my brother achieve some great things in life."

Attending St Vincent's Primary School, St Cuthbert's High School and Hopwood Hall School, Thompson excelled in athletics and was a good 800-metre runner, but "wanted to be a part of something on a long term". This led Thompson to begin playing football for a local team "as a way of integrating". In 1998, he joined Manchester United's youth team and played alongside James Chester, Danny Drinkwater and Tom Cleverley. At school, Thompson said "that football slowly turned him from an outsider into one of the gang" and that he had an air of arrogance and confidence in any situation, as he was good at something. His teachers warned him that he still needed to concentrate on his studies in case he "might not make it", but that did not stop him from "practising his signature on scraps of paper at the back of the classroom". He said life was "great" for him until at age 16, he learnt that Manchester United released him because he was small. Thompson said his release was difficult to take and he did not tell any of his friends for at least two weeks: "I'd always been a winner – the best at football, athletics and basketball – but now I was a loser."

== Career ==
=== Rochdale ===
Determined to become a footballer, Thompson went on trials at Blackburn Rovers and Liverpool but failed to win a contract. One day, his teacher told him to "go down to Rochdale". Initially reluctant as "he thought he was better than that", Thompson ended up relenting and joined the club, as he realised it did not matter what team he played for in the past, as long as, everyone were all in the same boat". Soon, Thompson was told by Rochdale's management that "he soon be playing for the first team." Aged seventeen, Thompson made his debut for the club, coming on as an 83rd-minute substitute, in a 2–0 loss against Carlisle United on 2 May 2006 during the 2005–06 season, in what turned out to be his only appearance of the season.

Thompson made his first appearance of the 2006–07 season, coming on as an 86th-minute substitute, in a 1–0 loss against Swindon Town on 12 August 2006. He then made his first start for the club against Milton Keynes Dons on 23 December 2006 and started the whole game, in a 2–1 loss. In a follow–up match against Wrexham, Thompson set up Rochdale's second goal of the game and helped the club draw 2–2. Following this, he was given more playing time for the rest of the 2006–07 season. At the end of the 2006–07 season, Thompson went on to make thirteen appearances in all competitions. For his performance, he was awarded the League Two Apprentice award. After this achievement, manager Keith Hill hoped Thompson would continue to make progress.

Ahead of the 2007–08 season, Thompson signed his first professional contract with Rochdale on 5 July 2007. After missing the opening game of the season against Peterborough United due to injury, he made his first appearance of the season, coming on as a 62nd-minute substitute, in a 2–1 loss against Chester City. However, Thompson was plagued with an injury that kept him out for two months. He returned from injury on 26 December 2007, coming on as a late substitute in a 2–0 win against Wrexham. Five days later on 1 January 2008, Thompson scored his first goal for the club, in a 3–1 win over Darlington. However, he continued to be plagued with injuries on three occasions, as the 2007–08 season progressed. Rochdale went on to reach the play–off final against Stockport County, only to lose 3–2. At the end of the 2007–08 season, Thompson went on to make thirteen appearances and scoring once in all competitions.

At the start of the 2008–09 season, Thompson missed the first seven league matches of the season, due to an injury. He made his return from injury, coming on as an 88th-minute substitute, in a 3–1 win against Accrington Stanley on 28 September 2008. Since returning from injury, this proved to be Thompson's breakthrough season under the management of Keith Hill, as he received more playing time. Thompson scored his first goal of the season on 25 October 2008 in a 3–1 win over Aldershot Town. He then scored a hat-trick in a 4–2 victory against Aldershot Town on 31 January 2009, scoring against them three times this season. This was followed by scoring in the next game on 3 February 2009 in a 2–0 win over Chester City. After the match, Thompson's performance, along with attacking tactics were praised by manager Hill. Having helped Rochdale qualify for the League Two play–offs, he played in both legs against Gillingham, as the club lost 2–1 on aggregate. Despite being sidelined on three more occasions later in the 2008–09 season, Thompson made thirty–five appearances and scoring five times in all competitions. Following this, he was rewarded with a new one-year contract after being offered a new contract by Rochdale.

In the opening game of the 2009–10 season, Thompson started the season well when he scored a goal and won a man of the match award against Port Vale. Since then, Thompson was involved in a number of first team matches, playing in the midfield position. A few weeks later, on 29 August 2009, he scored his second goal of the season in a 3–0 win over Bury. Six days later on 5 September 2009, Thompson scored his third goal of the season, in a 3–3 draw against Morecambe. His next goal came on 7 November 2009 when he scored a vital late brace against Luton Town in the first round of the FA Cup to take the fixture to a replay. However, in the FA Cup replay against Luton Town, Rochdale lost 2–0, eliminating the club from the competition. After missing one match, due to injury, Thompson scored on his return from injury, in a 3–1 win over Lincoln City. After being sidelined for weeks due to a knee injury, he made his return from injury, coming on as an 82nd-minute substitute, in a 1–1 draw against Lincoln City on 6 March 2010. This was followed up by scoring his seventh goal of the season, in a 1–0 win against Shrewsbury Town. Two weeks later on 27 March 2010, Thompson scored his eighth goal of the season, in a 4–1 win against Grimsby Town. Rochdale were later promoted to League One after beating Northampton Town 1–0 on 17 April 2010. At the end of the 2009–10 season, he made thirty–nine appearances and scoring eight times in all competitions. Following this, Thompson's performances resulted in him being rewarded with a new-two year deal with the club. The Manchester Evening News described the player as the "most improved member of the squad displaying great maturity in his performances, offering defensive cover and an outlet going forward. A fringe player in recent seasons, the youngster has proved his credentials with a string of impressive displays".

At the start of the 2010–11 season, Thompson started the season well when he set up the only goal of the game, in a 1–0 win against Barnsley in the first round of the League Cup. However, Thompson continued to be involved in the first team, as he soon found himself rotating in and out of the starting line–up, as well as, facing his own injury concern. In early–February, Thompson suffered a thigh injury while training and missed nine matches as a result. But he made his return to the first team from injury against Hartlepool United on 25 March 2011, coming on as an 85th-minute substitute, in a 2–0 loss. Following this, Thompson scored his first goal of the season, in a 2–0 win against Southampton on 11 April 2011. He then scored his second goal of the season, in a 3–2 win against Carlisle United on 23 April 2011. At the end of the 2010–11 season, Thompson went on to make thirty–four appearances and scoring three times in all competitions. For his performance, he was named Dale Dragons Young Player of the Season.

At the start of the 2011–12 season, Thompson found his playing time, mostly coming from the substitute bench. After being sidelined for a month due to his fitness concern, he made his return to the first team against Aldershot Town in the third round of the League Cup on 20 September 2011, coming on as a 71st-minute substitute, in a 2–1 loss. However, his return was short–lived when Thompson suffered a thigh injury and was out for almost three months. It was not until on 31 December 2011 when he made his return from injury, starting a match and played 69 minutes before being substituted, in a 0–0 draw against Walsall. Following this, Thompson found his playing time, coming from the substitute bench for the rest of the 2011–12 season. It was not until on 14 April 2012 when he scored his first goal of the season, in a 3–2 win against Exeter City. However, Thompson was unable to help Rochdale avoid relegation after the club lost 2–1 to Chesterfield. At the end of the 2011–12 season, he went on to make twenty–one appearances and scoring once in all competitions.

Shortly after the end of the 2011–12 season, Thompson was offered a new contract by Rochdale. Having yet to reach his decision after two months, he featured in the pre-season friendly match against Blackburn Rovers and scored the only goal of the game. However, Thompson then announced his intention to play abroad, but because he was under 24, he could not leave the club on a free transfer, and was soon linked with a move to Tranmere Rovers.

=== Tranmere Rovers ===
On 3 August 2012, Thompson signed a two-year deal with League One side Tranmere Rovers after signing for an undisclosed fee from Rochdale. Upon joining the club, he was given a number seven shirt. Thompson explained his move joining Tranmere Rovers, citing the impact of the maturity he made.

Thompson made his debut for the club in the first round of the League Cup, starting and playing 120 minutes in a 2–1 win over Chesterfield on 14 August. Four days later, he made his league debut for Tranmere, starting the whole game, in a 3–1 win over Leyton Orient. In a follow–up match against Carlisle United, he set the opening goal of the game for Andy Robinson, who scored a hat–trick, in a 3–0 win. However, Thompson found himself out of the starting line–up, due to his own injury concerns and his playing time coming from the substitute bench. Despite this, he scored his first goal for the club on 6 October, in a 1–0 win over Notts County. Thompson scored his second goal of the season, in the first round of the FA Cup, in a 3–0 win over Braintree Town on 13 November. After being recalled by Tranmere, he appeared two more matches towards the end of the 2012–13 season. At the end of the 2012–13 season, Thompson went on to make thirty-four appearances and scoring twice in all competitions.

Upon recovering from his injury, Thompson re-joined Rochdale on loan until the end of the season. He made his second debut for the club, coming on as a 65th-minute substitute, in a 3–0 loss against Morecambe on 2 March 2013. Thompson was in the first team regular at Rochdale until he was recalled by his parent club on 4 April. By the time Thompson was recalled by the club, he made seven appearances for the club.

At the beginning of the 2013–14 season, Thompson started the season well when he scored twice in a 3–3 draw with Crawley Town on 10 August 2013 after being on the bench in the opening game of the season against Walsall. Thompson continued to be involved in the first team, playing in the right–midfield position. However, he continued to suffer setback with injuries and was out on two occasions. Following the announcement of his diagnosis with nodular sclerosis Hodgkin lymphoma, a rare form of cancer, it was announced that Thompson would be out for the remainder of the 2013–14 season. In Tranmere's first match since the announcement against Preston North End, both sets of fans held a minute's applause in the 7th minute for the player. Although the club were relegated to League Two at the end of the season, he went on to finish the season, making eight appearances and scoring two times in all competitions. Following this, Tranmere were in discussions with Thompson over a new contract. However, the club released the player when his contract expired and was let go. Upon joining Bury, he later criticised Tranmere for the way they handled the contract negotiations during his absence, and was released by the club.

=== Bury ===
On 2 August 2014, Thompson announced via his Twitter account that he had signed a one-year contract at Bury. His move came after Thompson went on trial with the club and was featured in the pre-season friendly matches. Upon signing, Thompson was described by manager David Flitcroft as an "inspiration", citing his improvement of his mental strength.

He made his Bury debut in the first round of the League Cup, against Bolton Wanderers, coming on as an 85th-minute substitute, in a 3–2 loss. Thompson made three more appearances for the club, all of them were coming from the substitute bench. However, he spent most of the first half of the season on the bench due to a lack of match fitness. At the end of the 2014–15 season, Thompson was one of four players released by Bury.

==== Loan spells from Bury ====
On 27 November 2014, it was announced that Thompson would be loaned out to Wrexham until 4 January 2015. He made his only appearance for the club against Southport on 16 December, only to injure his hamstring and was substituted as a result. However, Thompson returned to Bury when his loan expired at Wrexham.

On 14 February 2015, Thompson signed for Southport on a one-month loan. He made his debut for the club on the same day, in a 1–1 draw against Macclesfield Town. After making four appearances for Southport, Thompson returned to his parent club.

On 21 April, Thompson joined St Johnstone on trial. However, his trial expired after he failed to earn a contract offer from the club.

=== Carlisle United ===
After an unsuccessful trial at St Johnstone, Thompson began training with Carlisle United. After being offered a new contract by the club, he signed a six-month contract with Carlisle United on 31 July 2015. Upon joining the club, Thompson was given a number twenty–three shirt.

He made his debut for Carlisle United against Cambridge United on 15 August, starting a match and playing 75 minutes before being substituted, in a 4–4 draw. In a follow–up match, Thompson scored his first goal for the club, in a 4–1 loss against Plymouth Argyle. Since joining Carlisle United, he found his playing time, mostly coming from the substitute bench. Despite this, Thompson signed a contract extension with the club until the end of the 2015–16 season. At the end of the season, he went on to make seventeen appearances and scoring once in all competitions. Reflecting this, Thompson said: "I ended up playing about 15–20 games during that season, which wasn't much, but it was progress at least." However, he was released at the end of the season.

=== Return to Rochdale ===
On 7 August 2016, Thompson re-joined Rochdale on a six-month deal. Upon joining the club, he said: "Everyone is well aware of what has gone on in my life and I know that the club supported me really well through my hard times, so I want to give back".

Thompson made his third debut for Rochdale, coming on as an 80th-minute substitute, in a 2–1 win against Chesterfield in the first round of the League Cup. Since joining the club, he found himself in and out of the first team, playing in the midfield position. This lasted until Thompson suffered an injury in the 19th minute during a 3–0 win against Southend United on 8 October. After being sidelined for three weeks, he made his return to the first team from injury, coming on as a 68th-minute substitute, in a 1–0 win against Oldham Athletic on 29 October. Thompson followed up by starting in the next seven matches, playing in different midfield positions. On 2 December, Thompson signed a contract extension with Rochdale, keeping him until 2018. Eight days later, he scored his Rochdale goal in four years, in a 3–2 win against Scunthorpe United. During a 2–0 win against Walsall in which he scored his second goal of the season, Thompson suffered a back injury that saw him sidelined for a month. It was not until on 11 February 2017 when he made his return from injury, starting a match and playing 45 minutes before being substituted, in a 0–0 draw against Fleetwood Town. Thompson then scored his third goal of the season, in a 3–1 loss against Peterborough United on 25 February. However, he was sidelined for the rest of the 2016–17 season after his cancer had returned. On two occasions against Gillingham on 18 March and his former club Bury on 13 April, both sets of fans held a minute's applause in the 15th minute for the player. At the end of the 2016–17 season, Thompson went on to make twenty–seven appearances and scoring three times in all competitions.

After being in remission following his battle with cancer for a second time, manager Keith Hill said he was not rushing Thompson back to the first team. As a result, Thompson spent the next six months on the sidelines. Thompson made his return to the first team from injury, coming on as a 72nd-minute substitute and was given a standing ovation by both supporters, in a 1–1 draw against Walsall on 23 December 2017. After the match, he spoke about his return to the pitch following his battle with cancer. Since returning from the sidelines, Thompson found his playing time, coming from the substitute bench, appearing four times for Rochdale between December and February. After a month absence, he made his return to the first team against Portsmouth on 7 April 2018, coming on as 73rd-minute substitute, in a 3–3 draw. With his return, Thompson contributed to the club's improved results in the remaining six matches of the season. This included scoring in the last game of the season against Charlton Athletic, which turned out to be the only goal of the game, as Rochdale avoided relegation. Following this, he was awarded 'Laureus Sporting Moment of the Year Award'. At the end of the 2017–18 season, Thompson went on to make eleven appearances and scoring once in all competitions. and signed a contract extension.

Ahead of the 2018–19 season, Thompson appeared five times out of the six Rochdale's pre–season matches. He made his only appearance of the 2018–19 season against Burton Albion in the opening game of the season, coming on as a 64th-minute substitute, in a 2–1 win. Following this, Thompson was on the sidelines for the next six months.

=== Retirement ===
On 5 February 2019, Thompson announced his retirement from professional football. Explaining his retirement on Rochdale's website, he said: "My decision to retire has been one of the hardest I've ever had to make. After several discussions with my specialists and consultants it is with a heavy heart that I am retiring from the game I love. I have battled through some of life's hardest challenges and have managed to overcome them. However, I've pushed my body to the absolute limit." In the club's first match against Coventry City's first match since his announcement, Thompson was given a guard of honour by both teams. On 5 April, he was awarded the Sir Tom Finney Award.

Rochdale announced on their website on 11 June 2019 that the club would be holding his testimonial match. Following his retirement from professional football, Thompson worked as a motivational speaker. In April 2021, Thompson was announced as the co-presenter of BBC Squad Goals with Sanny Rudravajhala and Lucy Oliva. The show is networked across Local BBC Radio on BBC Sounds and on the BBC Sport website.

== Personal life and death ==
Thompson also studied Level Two Coaching Certificate and "achieved his BTEC National Certificate with a potential merit/distinction profile". In September 2018, his former school, St Vincent's Primary School, named their Multi Use Games Arena after him. A month later, he launched his autobiography Darkness and Light: My Story and held a book signing at Spotland Stadium. In the book, Thompson credited his agent Gary Lloyd, who died in 2017, for him to write a book and "considered him to be way more than an agent, more than a friend; he was a father figure who gave the player guidance."

Thompson married his wife, Chantelle, in 2016, and became a father in September 2014 when his partner gave birth to a daughter.

=== Illness and death ===
On 1 November 2013, it emerged that Thompson had been diagnosed with nodular sclerosis Hodgkin lymphoma, a rare form of blood cancer, and that he would immediately begin chemotherapy as treatment for the disease. Tranmere Rovers chief executive Mick Horton said, "Joe will get all the love and support we can give him". The diagnosis shocked his former teammate Jack Redshaw, then teammate Ryan Lowe (who dedicated his goal against Accrington Stanley on 9 November 2013 to him), and former managers, Keith Hill and Ronnie Moore. This led to a campaign for Grow 4 Joe challenge for the player. He later credited tennis player Ross Hutchins, who successfully recovered from the same cancer, as the inspiration for him to fight against cancer. On 16 June 2014, Thompson announced on his Twitter that he had completed remission after months of chemotherapy and "couldn't wait" to get back out on the football pitch.

On 16 March 2017, Thompson announced in a statement on the Rochdale website that his cancer had returned. Thompson adopted a vegan diet to rebuild his body quicker. In June 2017, he ended up beating cancer for the second time two months later. Thompson later reflected about beating cancer for the second time, saying: "I'm 99 per cent sure it's not coming back. But then if it does, I've got over it before so I can get over it again. I'm not scared, I look forward to life. I've got aspirations. This game is all about winning. And what I've been through has taught me that I've got the tools not only to win a few football matches but to win the game of life."

In April 2024, Thompson revealed that he had been diagnosed with cancer for the third time. He had stage four lymphoma which had spread to his lungs.

Thompson died on 17 April 2025, at the age of 36.

On 1 August 2025, Rochdale announced that they had retired the number 15 shirt in honour of Thompson.

== Career statistics ==
Appearances and goals by club, season and competition
| Club | Season | League | | | FA Cup | | League Cup | | Other | | Total | |
| Club | Season | Division | Apps | Goals | Apps | Goals | Apps | Goals | Apps | Goals | Apps | Goals |
|---|---|---|---|---|---|---|---|---|---|---|---|---|
| Rochdale | 2005–06 | League Two | 1 | 0 | 0 | 0 | 0 | 0 | 0 | 0 | 1 | 0 |
| Rochdale | 2006–07 | League Two | 13 | 0 | 0 | 0 | 0 | 0 | 0 | 0 | 13 | 0 |
| Rochdale | 2007–08 | League Two | 12 | 1 | 0 | 0 | 0 | 0 | 1 (Note: Appearances in the Football League Trophy) | 0 | 13 | 1 |
| Rochdale | 2008–09 | League Two | 30 | 5 | 1 | 0 | 0 | 0 | 4 | 0 | 35 | 5 |
| Rochdale | 2009–10 | League Two | 36 | 6 | 2 | 2 | 1 | 0 | 1 | 0 | 40 | 8 |
| Rochdale | 2010–11 | League One | 32 | 2 | 0 | 0 | 1 | 0 | 1 | 0 | 34 | 2 |
| Rochdale | 2011–12 | League One | 17 | 1 | 0 | 0 | 3 | 0 | 1 | 0 | 21 | 1 |
| Rochdale | Total | | 141 | 15 | 3 | 2 | 5 | 0 | 8 | 0 | 157 | 17 |
| Tranmere Rovers | 2012–13 | League One | 19 | 1 | 2 | 1 | 2 | 0 | 1 | 0 | 24 | 2 |
| Tranmere Rovers | 2013–14 | League One | 6 | 2 | 0 | 0 | 1 | 0 | 1 | 0 | 8 | 2 |
| Tranmere Rovers | Total | | 25 | 3 | 2 | 1 | 3 | 0 | 2 | 0 | 32 | 4 |
| Rochdale (loan) | 2012–13 | League Two | 7 | 0 | 0 | 0 | 0 | 0 | 0 | 0 | 7 | 0 |
| Bury | 2014–15 | League Two | 1 | 0 | 1 | 0 | 1 | 0 | 1 | 0 | 4 | 0 |
| Wrexham (loan) | 2014–15 | Conference Premier | 0 | 0 | 0 | 0 | ~ | ~ | 1 (Note: Appearance in the FA Trophy) | 0 | 1 | 0 |
| Southport (loan) | 2014–15 | Conference Premier | 4 | 0 | 0 | 0 | ~ | ~ | 0 | 0 | 4 | 0 |
| Carlisle United | 2015–16 | League Two | 15 | 1 | 1 | 0 | 0 | 0 | 1 | 0 | 17 | 1 |
| Rochdale | 2016–17 | League One | 21 | 3 | 2 | 0 | 2 | 0 | 2 | 0 | 27 | 3 |
| Rochdale | 2017–18 | League One | 10 | 1 | 1 | 0 | 0 | 0 | 0 | 0 | 11 | 1 |
| Rochdale | 2018–19 | League One | 1 | 0 | 0 | 0 | 0 | 0 | 0 | 0 | 1 | 0 |
| Rochdale | Total | | 32 | 4 | 3 | 0 | 2 | 0 | 2 | 0 | 39 | 4 |
| Career total | | | 225 | 23 | 10 | 3 | 11 | 0 | 15 | 0 | 261 | 26 |

== Honours ==
Individual

- Sir Tom Finney Award: 2019
