= Chris Brown (footballer, born 1992) =

English footballer (born 1991)

Personal information
- Full name: Christopher Robert Brown
- Date of birth: 21 February 1992 (age 34)
- Place of birth: Stockport, England
- Position: Defender

Team information
- Current team: Rochdale (Youth Team Manager)

Youth career
- –2009: Rochdale

Senior career*
Years	Team	Apps	(Gls)
2009–2011	Rochdale	1	(0)
2010	→ Droylsden (loan)	6	(0)
2010	→ Ashton United (loan)	4	(0)
2011	→ Hyde (loan)	2	(0)
2011–2013	Droylsden	63	(5)
2013	Mossley	22	(2)
- * Club domestic league appearances and goals as of 21:25, 5 July 2011 (UTC)

Christopher Robert Brown (born 21 February 1992) is an English former professional footballer who coached for Rochdale as the club's Youth Development Phase as the Lead Coach from Under 13s to Under 16s, then progressing within the club to their Professional Development Phase Lead Coach (Youth Team Manager). Brown managed the Under 18s coach for seven years.

Brown is now working with Wigan Athletic within their academy. He will be working at the Championship club, who are Category 2 status, with the Under 15 and Under 16 teams.

== Career ==
Brown made his debut on 1 September 2009, for Rochdale in their 2–1 home defeat to Bradford City in the Football League Trophy, replacing David Flitcroft in the 85th minute as a substitute. In August 2010, Brown was loaned to Northern Premier League side Ashton United, before being loaned out again to Hyde in March 2011. He signed for Droylsden in June 2011 and left the club in September 2013 by mutual consent. In October, he joined Mossley.

In November 2013, he joined Rochdale Academy staff as the club's Youth Development Lead Coach, after working part-time in the club younger age groups. After spending three years in the role, Rochdale appointed him Youth Team Manager (May 2016).
