= Marcus Holness =

English footballer

Personal information
- Full name: Marcus Lewis Holness
- Date of birth: 8 December 1988 (age 37)
- Place of birth: Swinton, England
- Height: 6 ft 0 in (1.83 m)
- Position: Defender

Youth career
- 2005–2007: Oldham Athletic

Senior career*
Years	Team	Apps	(Gls)
2007–2008	Oldham Athletic	0	(0)
2007	→ Ossett Town (loan)		
2007–2008	→ Rochdale (loan)	9	(0)
2008–2012	Rochdale	99	(4)
2009	→ Barrow (loan)	11	(0)
2012–2014	Burton Albion	39	(1)
2014–2016	Tranmere Rovers	21	(0)
2016	→ Altrincham (loan)	14	(1)
- * Club domestic league appearances and goals as of 14:37, 5 September 2015 (UTC)

Marcus Lewis Holness (born 8 December 1988 in Swinton, Greater Manchester) is an English retired professional footballer. He was a defender.

== Career ==
=== Oldham Athletic ===
Holness began his career with Oldham Athletic and signed his first professional contract with them at the end of the 2006–07 season, but did not play any competitive matches for them.

While at Oldham Athletic, Holness was loaned out to Ossett Town until December. But the loan spell at Ossett Town was cut short and signed on loan on 2 October 2007 for Rochdale. On 12 October 2007, he made his Rochdale debut, where he played 46 minutes, in a 2–1 win over Grimsby Town. After extending his loan spell with the club, he played nine times for the Dale and impressed with his performances that manager Keith Hill made him Rochdale's first signing of the January 2008 transfer window, joining on a free transfer.

=== Rochdale ===
Holness' first game after signing for the club on a permanent basis came on 26 January 2008, in a 1–0 win over Milton Keynes Dons. As the 2007–08 season progressed, Holness spent the rest of the season on the substitute bench, restricting him to twenty-one appearances.

After missing out at the start of the 2008–09 season, due to injury, Holness' first appearance of the season, as well as, from injury, came on 10 October 2008, in a 1–1 draw against Lincoln City. With his first team opportunities limited and have only made six league appearances with Rochdale in the 2008–09 season. Holness was loaned to Conference National side Barrow for a month in January 2009. After a month at Barrow, the deal was later extended for another month before returning to the club soon after.

After an unsuccessful 2009–10 season, which saw him make fourteen appearances in all competition, though the club was promoted to League One, Holness was given a first team opportunity in the 2010–11 season following the departure of Nathan Stanton. His performance in the first team at the club saw him signed a contract extension, keeping him until 2013. On 25 April 2011, he scored his first senior goal as Rochdale was defeated by Charlton Athletic. Holness spent his most successful period in Rochdale at 10/11 season, as the club debuted in the League One finishing at ninth position while Holness never missed a game during the season and because of this, he was named the club's Most Improved Player.

However, in the 2011–12 season, Holness continued to be a first team regular at the club and then scored his first goal of the season, in a 4–2 win over Bury. By the first half of the season, he scored two more goals against Colchester United and Brentford. However, Holness fell out of favour after Rochdale manager Steve Eyre was replaced by John Coleman. Despite Rochdale relegated back to the League Two this season, Coleman kept his place and Holness was released by the club after five seasons in the team having made over 100 appearances for the club.

=== Burton Albion ===
On 16 July 2012, Holness joined League Two side Burton Albion signing a two-year deal after a short trial.

Holness made his Burton Albion debut in the first round of the League Cup against Sheffield United, but was sent-off in extra time after a second bookable offence, though they went through to next round following a penalty-shootout. After serving a two match suspension, his league debut finally came on 1 September 2012, in a 3–0 loss against Exeter City. However, he suffered a hamstring injury during a match against York City on 19 September 2012. After two months on the sidelines, Holness made his return from injury on 10 November 2012, in a 1–0 loss against Cheltenham Town. His first goal then came on 23 February 2013, in a 4–2 win over Exeter City. Despite suffering from another injury, Holness finished the season, making thirty appearances in all competitions.

In the 2013–14 season, Holness started well in the first team when he was featured in the first nine matches and was praised by Manager Gary Rowett. But unfortunately, Holness received a straight red card "for raising his hands towards an opponent" in the 22nd minute, in a 3–1 loss against Wimbledon on 21 September 2013. Following this, Holness' first team opportunities soon became limited, as he struggled to dispatch the first team place from Damien McCrory and Shane Cansdell-Sherriff. Following this, Holness was given a handful of first team appearances, which resulted him making nine more appearances, as the season progressed. In the play-offs, Holness was featured started all three matches and scored against Southend United in the second leg, but was unsuccessful in the final following a 1–0 loss against Fleetwood Town.

He spent two full seasons at Burton-upon-Trent as the club twice finished in the play-off zone but lost both attempts. Holness was offered new deal at the end of the 2013–14 season. Despite confident from Rowett that he would sign a contract, Holness, however, never did.

=== Tranmere Rovers ===
On 27 June 2014 Holness left Burton Albion to join fellow League Two club Tranmere Rovers signing two-year contract. Upon joining the club, Holness was given number six shirt for the new season, as well as, being appointed as a new captain.

Holness made his Tranmere Rovers debut, where he made his debut and played the whole game, in a 1–1 draw against York City in the opening game of the season. After being absent for one game Holness quickly recovered to back in the starting squad against Wycombe Wanderers on 19 August 2014. After, Holness established himself as a regular starter but on 10 January his season was ended as he suffered serious knee ligament damage. Because of his absence and finished his first season, making twenty-four appearances in all competitions, Tranmere Rovers were relegated to the National League.

In the 2015–16 season, Holness fully recovered to make his first start since January on 29 August at Altrincham as they lost 4=1. He made only two more caps before picking up another injury in mid-September. On 19 January 2016, Holness was loaned out to Altrincham on a month loan. Holness made his Altrincham debut, where he made a start and played the whole game, in a 3–1 win over Woking on 26 January 2016. After extending his loan spell until the end of the season, Holness then scored his first goal for the club on 8 March 2016, in a 3–2 loss against Gateshead. After suffering a stomach injury and getting a red card against Dover Athletic, the club, however, suffered relegation to National League North for next season and upon returning to his parent club, Holness was released by the club.

After leaving the club, Holness went on trial at his former club, Rochdale, but was unsuccessful at the trial after suffering from an injury during a pre-season friendly match against AFC Fylde. As a result, Holness announced his retirement from professional football.

== Career statistics ==
As of match played 12 February 2016

Appearances and goals by club, season and competition
Club	Season	League			FA Cup		League Cup		Other (Note: Appearance(s) in Football League Trophy)		Total	
Club	Season	Division	Apps	Goals	Apps	Goals	Apps	Goals	Apps	Goals	Apps	Goals
Rochdale	2007–08	League Two	20 (Note: Appearance(s) including loan spell)	0	—		—		1	0	21	0
Rochdale	2008–09	League Two	7	0	2	0	—		1	0	10	0
Rochdale	2009–10	League Two	11	0	2	0	1	0	1	0	15	0
Rochdale	2010–11	League One	46	1	1	0	2	0	1	0	50	1
Rochdale	2011–12	League One	24	3	1	0	3	0	2	0	30	3
Rochdale	Total		108	4	6	0	6	0	6	0	126	4
Barrow (loan)	2008–09	Conference Premier	11	0	—		—		—		11	0
Burton Albion	2012–13	League Two	22	1	3	0	2	0	3 (Note: Appearance(s) in Football League Trophy and Football League Two play-offs)	0	30	1
Burton Albion	2013–14	League Two	17	0	—		2	0	4	1	23	1
Burton Albion	Total		39	1	3	0	4	0	7	1	53	2
Tranmere Rovers	2014–15	League Two	17	0	4	0	—		3	0	24	0
Tranmere Rovers	2015–16	National League	4	0	0	0	—		0	0	4	0
Tranmere Rovers	Total		21	0	4	0	0	0	3	0	28	0
Altrincham (loan)	2015–16	National League	3	0	—		—		—		3	0
Career total			182	5	13	0	10	0	16	0	221	5

== Personal life ==
After announcing his retirement, Holness moved away from football to become a consultant.
