= 2006–07 Rochdale A.F.C. season =

English football club season

Rochdale
2006–07 season
- Chairman: Chris Dunphy
- Manager: Steve Parkin/Keith Hill
- League Two: 9th
- FA Cup: First round
- League Cup: First round
- Football League Trophy: Second round
- Top goalscorer: League: Chris Dagnall (17 goals); All: Chris Dagnall (18 goals)

The 2006-07 season was Rochdale A.F.C.'s 100th in existence and their 33rd consecutive in the fourth tier of the English football league (League Two). Rochdale finished the season in 9th place.

== Statistics ==
No.	Pos	Nat	Player	Total		League Two		FA Cup		League Cup		League Trophy	
No.	Pos	Nat	Player	Apps	Goals	Apps	Goals	Apps	Goals	Apps	Goals	Apps	Goals
1	GK	(Scotland) SCO	Matt Gilks	51	0	46 + 0	0	2 + 0	0	1 + 0	0	2 + 0	0
2	DF	(England) ENG	Simon Ramsden	36	3	32 + 2	3	0 + 0	0	1 + 0	0	1 + 0	0
3	DF	(England) ENG	Mark Jackson	14	0	8 + 4	0	1 + 0	0	0 + 0	0	0 + 1	0
4	MF	(England) ENG	Tom Bates	2	0	0 + 2	0	0 + 0	0	0 + 0	0	0 + 0	0
4	MF	(England) ENG	Ernie Cooksey	24	0	10 + 9	0	2 + 0	0	1 + 0	0	1 + 1	0
5	MF	(England) ENG	John Doolan	44	5	40 + 0	3	1 + 0	1	1 + 0	1	2 + 0	0
6	DF	(England) ENG	Jon Boardman	7	0	3 + 1	0	0 + 1	0	1 + 0	0	1 + 0	0
6	FW	(England) ENG	Ben Muirhead	12	3	12 + 0	3	0 + 0	0	0 + 0	0	0 + 0	0
7	MF	(England) ENG	Darrell Clarke	12	1	5 + 7	1	0 + 0	0	0 + 0	0	0 + 0	0
7	MF	(Nigeria) NGA	Kelvin Etuhu	4	2	3 + 1	2	0 + 0	0	0 + 0	0	0 + 0	0
7	MF	(England) ENG	Stephen Turnbull	4	0	2 + 2	0	0 + 0	0	0 + 0	0	0 + 0	0
8	MF	(England) ENG	Gary Jones	31	3	26 + 1	3	2 + 0	0	0 + 0	0	2 + 0	0
9	FW	(England) ENG	Chris Dagnall	42	18	32 + 5	17	2 + 0	0	1 + 0	0	2 + 0	1
10	FW	(England) ENG	Iyseden Christie	6	0	4 + 1	0	0 + 0	0	1 + 0	0	0 + 0	0
10	FW	(England) ENG	Adam Le Fondre	7	4	7 + 0	4	0 + 0	0	0 + 0	0	0 + 0	0
11	MF	(England) ENG	Adam Rundle	32	5	20 + 9	4	2 + 0	0	1 + 0	1	0 + 0	0
12	DF	(England) ENG	Alan Goodall	50	3	46 + 0	3	1 + 0	0	1 + 0	0	2 + 0	0
14	DF	(England) ENG	Gary Brown	25	0	14 + 7	0	2 + 0	0	0 + 1	0	1 + 0	0
15	MF	(England) ENG	Joe Thompson	13	0	5 + 8	0	0 + 0	0	0 + 0	0	0 + 0	0
16	FW	(England) ENG	Keith Barker	16	1	11 + 1	0	0 + 2	0	0 + 0	0	2 + 0	1
16	MF	(England) ENG	David Perkins	18	0	14 + 4	0	0 + 0	0	0 + 0	0	0 + 0	0
17	FW	(England) ENG	Rickie Lambert	3	0	3 + 0	0	0 + 0	0	0 + 0	0	0 + 0	0
17	FW	(England) ENG	Glenn Murray	33	16	29 + 2	16	2 + 0	0	0 + 0	0	0 + 0	0
18	DF	(England) ENG	Nathan Stanton	39	0	35 + 0	0	2 + 0	0	1 + 0	0	1 + 0	0
19	DF	(England) ENG	Lee Crooks	34	0	26 + 5	0	0 + 0	0	1 + 0	0	2 + 0	0
20	FW	(England) ENG	Clive Moyo-Modise	22	1	1 + 18	1	0 + 0	0	0 + 1	0	2 + 0	0
21	DF	(England) ENG	James Sharp	14	1	12 + 0	1	1 + 0	0	0 + 0	0	1 + 0	0
23	DF	(Northern Ireland) NIR	Rory McArdle	26	0	25 + 0	0	1 + 0	0	0 + 0	0	0 + 0	0
24	MF	(England) ENG	Callum Warburton	5	0	4 + 0	0	0 + 1	0	0 + 0	0	0 + 0	0
26	MF	(England) ENG	Glenn Poole	6	0	1 + 5	0	0 + 0	0	0 + 0	0	0 + 0	0
26	FW	(England) ENG	Reuben Reid	2	0	0 + 2	0	0 + 0	0	0 + 0	0	0 + 0	0
26	FW	(France) FRA	Morike Sako	20	3	14 + 3	3	1 + 1	0	0 + 0	0	0 + 1	0
27	FW	(France) FRA	William Mocquet	7	1	6 + 1	1	0 + 0	0	0 + 0	0	0 + 0	0
27	MF	(England) ENG	Rory Prendergast	5	1	4 + 1	1	0 + 0	0	0 + 0	0	0 + 0	0
30	FW	(England) ENG	Louis Dodds	12	2	6 + 6	2	0 + 0	0	0 + 0	0	0 + 0	0
31	FW	(England) ENG	Danny Reet	6	0	0 + 6	0	0 + 0	0	0 + 0	0	0 + 0	0

== Competitions ==
=== Pre-season friendlies ===
22 July 2006	Rochdale	2–3	Manchester City	Rochdale
BST	Lambert 4'; Brown 12'	Report	Samaras 43'; Barton 60'; Dickov 64'	Stadium: Spotland Stadium

=== League Two ===
5 August 2006 1	Rochdale	0–1	Walsall	Rochdale
15:00 BST		Report	Picken (yellow card) 39'; Butler 48'	Stadium: Spotland; Attendance: 3,218; Referee: Dave Foster

8 August 2006 2	Torquay United	1–0	Rochdale	Torquay
19:45 BST	Mansell 87'	Report		Stadium: Plainmoor; Attendance: 3,039; Referee: Phil Crossley

12 August 2006 3	Swindon Town	1–0	Rochdale	Swindon
15:00 BST	Goodall 44' (o.g.); Pook (yellow card) 50'	Report	Christie (yellow card) 1'; Stanton (yellow card) 35'; Cooksey (yellow card) 49'; Gilks (yellow card) 73'	Stadium: County Ground; Attendance: 6,771; Referee: Ray Lee

19 August 2006 4	Rochdale	0–1	Notts County	Rochdale
15:00 BST	Doolan (yellow card) 50'	Report	White 51'; Ross (yellow card) 52'; Gleeson (yellow card) 81'	Stadium: Spotland; Attendance: 2,321; Referee: Keith Hill

26 August 2006 5	Accrington Stanley	1–1	Rochdale	Accrington
15:00 BST	Roberts 76' (pen.); Welch (yellow card) 81'	Report	Dagnall 20'; Doolan (yellow card) 70'; Stanton (yellow card) 84'	Stadium: Crown Ground; Attendance: 3,045; Referee: Andy Penn

2 September 2006 6	Rochdale	1–1	Hereford United	Rochdale
15:00 BST	Sharp (yellow card) 51'; Crooks (yellow card) 68'; Doolan (yellow card) 73'; Sako (yellow card) 90'; Jones 90' (pen.)	Report	Purdie 89' (pen.)	Stadium: Spotland; Attendance: 2,146; Referee: Colin Webster

9 September 2006 7	Bristol Rovers	0–0	Rochdale	Bristol
15:00 BST	Walker (yellow card) 70'	Report	Sako (yellow card) 45'; Sharp (yellow card) 73'	Stadium: Memorial Stadium; Attendance: 4,689; Referee: Kevin Wright

12 September 2006 8	Rochdale	1–0	Grimsby Town	Rochdale
19:45 BST	Sako 57'	Report		Stadium: Spotland; Attendance: 1,997; Referee: Russell Booth

16 September 2006 9	Rochdale	0–2	Wycombe Wanderers	Rochdale
15:00 BST		Report	Batista (yellow card) 13'; Mooney 16'; Martin (yellow card) 74'; Dixon 90'	Stadium: Spotland; Attendance: 2,313; Referee: Peter Walton

23 September 2006 10	Boston United	0–3	Rochdale	Boston
15:00 BST	Talbot (yellow card) 8'	Report	Dagnall 7', 33'; Doolan 90'	Stadium: York Street; Attendance: 1,709; Referee: Danny McDermid

27 September 2006 11	Wrexham	1–2	Rochdale	Wrexham
19:45 BST	Llewellyn 12'; Jones (yellow card) 36'	Report	Dagnall 48', 77'; Doolan (yellow card) 57'; Gilks (yellow card) 90'	Stadium: Racecourse Ground; Attendance: 3,577; Referee: Steve Bratt

30 September 2006 12	Rochdale	1–1	Shrewsbury Town	Rochdale
15:00 BST	Sharp 7'; Stanton (yellow card) 70'	Report	Cooke 62'; Humphrey (yellow card) 87'	Stadium: Spotland; Attendance: 2,942; Referee: Carl Boyeson

6 October 2006 13	Darlington	0–5	Rochdale	Darlington
19:30 BST	James (red card) 14'; Duke (yellow card) 72'; Rowson (yellow card) 73'	Report	Sako 7', 35'; Goodall 20'; Doolan (yellow card) 28'; Dagnall 45'; Moyo-Modise 82'	Stadium: The Darlington Arena; Attendance: 3,752; Referee: Andy Woolmer

14 October 2006 14	Rochdale	0–0	Chester City	Rochdale
15:00 BST	Stanton (yellow card) 14'; Goodall (yellow card) 87'	Report	Blundell (yellow card) 13'; Hand (yellow card) 85'; Walters (yellow card) 90'	Stadium: Spotland; Attendance: 3,149; Referee: Phil Joslin

21 October 2006 15	Lincoln City	7–1	Rochdale	Lincoln
15:00 BST	Forrester 11', 44', 49'; Stallard 16', 65'; Hughes 56', 77'	Report	Goodall 23' (yellow card) 51'; Dagnall (yellow card) 36'	Stadium: Sincil Bank; Attendance: 5,194; Referee: Fred Graham

28 October 2006 16	Rochdale	1–3	Stockport County	Rochdale
15:00 BST	Stanton (yellow card) 40'; Jones 53' (pen.); Goodall (yellow card) 57'; Sako (yellow card) 75'	Report	Williams 19'; Robinson 45' (pen.); Taylor (yellow card) 62'; Bramble 80'	Stadium: Spotland; Attendance: 3,709; Referee: Trevor Kettle

4 November 2006 17	Rochdale	1–3	Bury	Rochdale
15:00GMT	Dagnall 11'; Jones (yellow card) 58'; Boardman (red card) 90'	Report	Fitzgerald 15'; Bishop 29' (pen.), 90' (pen.); Baker (yellow card) 87'	Stadium: Spotland; Attendance: 4,499; Referee: Darren Drysdale

18 November 2006 18	Barnet	3–2	Rochdale	London
15:00GMT	Kandol 39', 49', 90' (yellow card) 90'	Report	Clarke 22'; Murray (yellow card) 34' (goal) 59'; Sharp (yellow card) 44'; Stanton (yellow card) 51'	Stadium: Underhill; Attendance: 1,972; Referee: Gary Sutton

25 November 2006 19	Rochdale	2–0	Mansfield Town	Rochdale
15:00GMT	Dagnall 24'; Doolan 41'	Report	Hjelde (yellow card) 84'	Stadium: Spotland; Attendance: 2,378; Referee: Scott Mathieson

5 December 2006 20	Macclesfield Town	1–0	Rochdale	Macclesfield
19:45GMT	McNeil 52'	Report		Stadium: Moss Rose; Attendance: 1,472; Referee: Uriah Rennie

9 December 2006 21	Rochdale	0–1	Peterborough United	Rochdale
15:00GMT	Warburton (yellow card) 20'; Stanton (yellow card) 50'	Report	Futcher (yellow card) 4'; McLean (yellow card) 50' (goal) 73'; Arber (yellow card) 59'	Stadium: Spotland; Attendance: 1,982; Referee: Rob Shoebridge

15 December 2006 22	Hartlepool United	1–0	Rochdale	Hartlepool
19:45GMT	Duffy 17'	Report	Sako (yellow card) 73'; Goodall (yellow card) 80'	Stadium: Victoria Park; Attendance: 3,659; Referee: Carl Boyeson

23 December 2006 23	Milton Keynes Dons	2–1	Rochdale	Milton Keynes
15:00GMT	McLeod 80'; Stanton 88' (o.g.)	Report	Warburton (yellow card) 43'; Harper 58' (o.g.)	Stadium: National Hockey Stadium; Attendance: 5,459; Referee: Dermot Gallagher

26 December 2006 24	Rochdale	2–2	Wrexham	Rochdale
12:00GMT	Murray 63'; Doolan 78'	Report	McEvilly 48'; Llewellyn 55'; Roche (yellow card) 68'	Stadium: Spotland; Attendance: 2,837; Referee: Jonathan Moss

30 December 2006 25	Rochdale	4–0	Boston United	Rochdale
15:00GMT	Jones 44'; Dagnall 62'; Mocquet 65'; Murray 70'	Report		Stadium: Spotland; Attendance: 2,159; Referee: Russell Booth

1 January 2007 26	Grimsby Town	0–4	Rochdale	Cleethorpes
15:00GMT		Report	Ramsden 13', 72' (yellow card) 18'; McArdle (yellow card) 22'; Murray 45'; Rundle 66'	Stadium: Blundell Park; Attendance: 4,302; Referee: Jarnail Singh

6 January 2007 27	Wycombe Wanderers	1–1	Rochdale	Wycombe
15:00GMT	Martin (yellow card) 25'; Easter 51' (yellow card) 89'	Report	Crooks (yellow card) 30'; Doolan (yellow card) 63'; Etuhu 80'	Stadium: Adams Park; Attendance: 4,067; Referee: Darren Drysdale

13 January 2007 28	Rochdale	0–1	Bristol Rovers	Rochdale
15:00GMT	McArdle (yellow card) 63'; Crooks (yellow card) 73'	Report	Igoe (yellow card) 45' (yellow-red card) 84'; Lambert 54'; Nicholson (yellow card) 82'; Campbell (yellow card) 90'	Stadium: Spotland; Attendance: 2,547; Referee: Keith Hill

27 January 2007 29	Rochdale	5–0	Milton Keynes Dons	Rochdale
15:00GMT	Le Fondre 5', 62'; Ramsden 10'; Prendergast 16'; Jones (yellow card) 55'; Stanton (yellow card) 69'; Etuhu 84' (yellow card) 85'	Report	Edds (yellow card) 58'	Stadium: Spotland; Attendance: 2,493; Referee: Neil Swarbrick

3 February 2007 30	Walsall	1–1	Rochdale	Walsall
15:00GMT	Fox (yellow card) 82'; Dann 90'	Report	Ince 5' (o.g.); Etuhu (yellow card) 8'	Stadium: Bescot Stadium; Attendance: 5,046; Referee: Richard Beeby

17 February 2007 31	Notts County	1–2	Rochdale	Nottingham
15:00GMT	Dudfield (yellow card) 38'; Lee (yellow card) 42' (goal) 53'; Silk (yellow card) 63'	Report	Le Fondre (yellow card) 74'; Murray 80'; Muirhead 83'	Stadium: Meadow Lane; Attendance: 4,493; Referee: Eddie Ilderton

20 February 2007 32	Rochdale	2–0	Torquay United	Rochdale
19:45GMT	Murray 19'; Le Fondre 90' (pen.)	Report	Robinson (yellow card) 40'; Easter (yellow card) 77'; Hill (yellow card) 86'; Mansell (yellow card) 90'; Miller (yellow card) 90'	Stadium: Spotland; Attendance: 2,456; Referee: Michael Jones

24 February 2007 33	Hereford United	0–0	Rochdale	Hereford
15:00GMT		Report	Stanton (yellow card) 81'	Stadium: Edgar Street; Attendance: 3,090; Referee: Pat Miller

3 March 2007 34	Rochdale	4–2	Accrington Stanley	Rochdale
15:00GMT	Rundle 14'; Perkins (yellow card) 22'; Murray 25', 32'; Le Fondre 82'	Report	Rogers (yellow card) 10'; Welch (yellow card) 27'; Whalley (yellow card) 33'; Edwards (yellow card) 62'; Mullin 70'; Cavanagh (yellow card) 79'; Mangan 90'	Stadium: Spotland; Attendance: 3,433; Referee: Rob Shoebridge

10 March 2007 35	Rochdale	0–0	Darlington	Rochdale
15:00GMT	Muirhead (yellow card) 74'	Report	Wheater (yellow card) 11'; Wainwright (yellow card) 65'	Stadium: Spotland; Attendance: 3,256; Referee: Grant Hegley

16 March 2007 36	Chester City	0–1	Rochdale	Chester
19:45GMT	Yeo (yellow card) 40'; Artell (yellow card) 90'; Hand (yellow card) 90'	Report	Dodds 5'; Doolan (yellow card) 90'	Stadium: Deva Stadium; Attendance: 2,197; Referee: Anthony Taylor

24 March 2007 37	Stockport County	2–7	Rochdale	Stockport
15:00GMT	Nolan (yellow card) 13'; Elding 32'; Dickinson 35'; Taylor (yellow card) 51'	Report	Murray 4', 53'; Goodall 11'; Rundle 15' (pen.); Muirhead 17', 46'; Crooks (yellow card) 56'; Dagnall 89'	Stadium: Edgeley Park; Attendance: 6,679; Referee: Danny McDermid

27 March 2007 38	Shrewsbury Town	3–0	Rochdale	Shrewsbury
BST	Fortune-West 48'; Edwards 65'; Drummond 78'	Report	Reet (yellow card) 60'; Perkins (yellow card) 71'	Stadium: Gay Meadow; Attendance: 4,363; Referee: Russell Booth

31 March 2007 39	Rochdale	2–0	Lincoln City	Rochdale
BST	Ramsden (yellow card) 16'; Dagnall 89'; Rundle 90'; Goodall (yellow card) 90'	Report	Green (yellow card) 37'	Stadium: Spotland; Attendance: 2,911; Referee: Phil Joslin

3 April 2007 40	Rochdale	0–0	Swindon Town	Rochdale
19:45 BST	Stanton (yellow card) 32'	Report	Smith (yellow card) 21'; Vincent (yellow card) 54'; Corr (yellow card) 88'	Stadium: Spotland; Attendance: 2,544; Referee: Rob Lewis

7 April 2007 41	Bury	0–1	Rochdale	Bury
15:00 BST	Scott (yellow card) 44'; Kempson (yellow card) 85' (yellow-red card) 85'; Challinor (yellow card) 90'	Report	Perkins (yellow card) 50'; Murray 74'; Jackson (yellow card) 81'; Reet (yellow card) 86'	Stadium: Gigg Lane; Attendance: 5,075; Referee: Colin Webster

9 April 2007 42	Rochdale	0–2	Barnet	Rochdale
15:00 BST	Perkins (yellow card) 20'; Goodall (yellow card) 73'	Report	Cogan 24'; Sinclair 33'; Devera (yellow card) 74'; Birchall (yellow card) 84'	Stadium: Spotland; Attendance: 2,525; Referee: Mark Haywood

14 April 2007 43	Mansfield Town	1–2	Rochdale	Mansfield
15:00 BST	Hjelde 45'	Report	Murray 9'; Dodds 90'	Stadium: Field Mill; Attendance: 2,023; Referee: Paul Melin

21 April 2007 44	Rochdale	5–0	Macclesfield Town	Rochdale
15:00 BST	Dagnall 20', 41', 45'; Murray 47', 59'	Report	Morley (yellow card) 18'; Holgate (yellow card) 26'; Scott (yellow card) 80'	Stadium: Spotland; Attendance: 2,989; Referee: Nigel Miller

28 April 2007 45	Rochdale	2–0	Hartlepool United	Rochdale
15:00 BST	Murray 2' (yellow card) 79'; Goodall (yellow card) 60'; Dagnall 76' (pen.); Doolan (red card) 79'	Report	Liddle (yellow card) 23'; Barker (red card) 75'; Monkhouse (red card) 78'; Porter (yellow card) 87'	Stadium: Spotland; Attendance: 5,846; Referee: Dean Whitestone

5 May 2007 46	Peterborough United	3–3	Rochdale	Peterborough
15:00 BST	Boyd 22', 26'; Blanchett 54'	Report	Murray 11'; Dagnall 63', 69'	Stadium: London Road; Attendance: 6,011; Referee: Pat Miller

=== F.A. Cup ===
11 November 2006 1	Rochdale	1–1	Hartlepool United	Rochdale
GMT	Jackson (yellow card) 17'; Doolan 62'	Report	Liddle (yellow card) 13'; Brown 41'	Stadium: Spotland; Attendance: 2,098; Referee: Clive Oliver

20 November 2006 1	Hartlepool United	0–0 (a.e.t.) (4–2 p)	Rochdale	Hartlepool
GMT	Williams (yellow card) 60'; Clark (yellow card) 79'	Report	Cooksey (yellow card) 17'; Goodall (yellow card) 26'; Dagnall (yellow card) 54'	Stadium: Victoria Park; Attendance: 2,788; Referee: Michael Jones
	Penalties
	Humphreys (penalty scored); Boland (penalty scored); Daly (penalty scored); Clark (penalty scored)		Jones (penalty scored); Barker (penalty missed); Goodall (penalty missed); Warburton (penalty scored)

=== League Cup ===
22 August 2006 1	Doncaster Rovers	3–2	Rochdale	Doncaster
BST	McCammon 55', 67'; Coppinger 56'; Guy (yellow card) 60'	Report	Dagnall (yellow card) 25'; Rundle 45'; Doolan 79'	Stadium: Belle Vue; Attendance: 3,690; Referee: Mike Russell

=== League Trophy ===
17 October 2006 1	Wrexham	1–1 (3–5 p)	Rochdale	Wrexham
BST	Crowell 80'	Report	Sharp (yellow card) 21'; Dagnall 40'	Stadium: Racecourse Ground; Attendance: 1,209; Referee: Mark Haywood
	Penalties
	Valentine (penalty scored); Llewellyn (penalty missed); Done (penalty scored); Williams (penalty scored)		Jones (penalty scored); Doolan (penalty scored); Goodall (penalty scored); Barker (penalty scored); Dagnall (penalty scored)

31 October 2006 2	Rochdale	1–1 (0–2 p)	Crewe Alexandra	Rochdale
GMT	Barker 60'; Goodall (yellow card) 70'; Dagnall (yellow card) 73'	Report	Varney 39'	Stadium: Spotland; Attendance: 1,148; Referee: Steve Bratt
	Penalties
	Jones (penalty missed); Barker (penalty missed); Goodall (penalty missed); Jackson (penalty missed)		Lowe (penalty scored); Varney (penalty missed); Dugdale (penalty scored); Maynard (penalty missed)
