= 2008 Football League Two play-off final =

- The match was played at Wembley Stadium.
| Stockport County | Rochdale |
| 3 | 2 |
- Date: 26 May 2008
- Venue: Wembley Stadium, London
- Man of the Match: Anthony Pilkington (Stockport County)
- Referee: Stuart Attwell
- Attendance: 35,715
- Weather: Rain, windy

The 2008 Football League Two play-off final was an association football match which was played on 26 May 2008 at Wembley Stadium, London, between Stockport County and Rochdale to determine the third and final team to gain promotion from Football League Two to the Football League One. The top three teams of the 2007–08 Football League Two season, Milton Keynes Dons, Peterborough United and Hereford United, gained automatic promotion to League One, while those placed from fourth to seventh in the table took part in play-offs. The winners of the play-off semi-finals competed for the final place for the 2008–09 season in League One. The losing semi-finalists were Darlington and Wycombe Wanderers.

The referee for the final, which was played in front of 35,715 spectators, was Stuart Attwell. Rochdale's Rory McArdle scored with a close-range header in the 24th minute before Tommy Rowe's cross was diverted into his own net Nathan Stanton for an own goal, to level the score. Four minutes into the second half, Stockport County took the lead once again when Anthony Pilkington scored with a header. He then passed to Dickinson who struck the ball past the Rochdale goalkeeper Tommy Lee to make it 3–1 in the 67th minute. Ten minutes later, Adam Rundle reduced the deficit when he scored from around 18 yards (16 m) but no further goals were scored and the match ended 3–2 to Stockport County.

Stockport County's following season saw them deducted ten points for entering administration. As a consequence, they ended the season in eighteenth place in the table, three positions and one point above the relegation zone. In Rochdale's next season, they finished in sixth position and qualified for the 2009 Football League play-offs where they lost 2–1 on aggregate to Gillingham in the semi-final.

== Route to the final ==
Football League Two final table, leading positions
| Pos | Team | Pld | W | D | L | GF | GA | GD | Pts |
|---|---|---|---|---|---|---|---|---|---|
| 1 | Milton Keynes Dons | 46 | 29 | 10 | 7 | 82 | 37 | +45 | 97 |
| 2 | Peterborough United | 46 | 28 | 8 | 10 | 84 | 43 | +41 | 92 |
| 3 | Hereford United | 46 | 26 | 10 | 10 | 72 | 41 | +31 | 88 |
| 4 | Stockport County | 46 | 24 | 10 | 12 | 72 | 54 | +18 | 82 |
| 5 | Rochdale | 46 | 23 | 11 | 12 | 77 | 54 | +23 | 80 |
| 6 | Darlington | 46 | 22 | 12 | 12 | 67 | 40 | +27 | 78 |
| 7 | Wycombe Wanderers | 46 | 22 | 12 | 12 | 56 | 42 | +14 | 78 |

Stockport County finished the regular 2007–08 season in fourth position in Football League Two, the fourth tier of the English football league system, one place and two points ahead of Rochdale. Both therefore missed out on the three automatic places for promotion to Football League One and instead took part in the play-offs to determine the fourth promoted team. Stockport County finished six points behind Hereford United (who were promoted in third place), ten behind Peterborough United (who were promoted in second place), and fifteen behind league winners Milton Keynes Dons. Stockport County had gained 55 points from their final 24 games, losing just three and finished the season in fourth place with 82 points. Rochdale picked up 45 points for their final 24 games and finished the season in fifth place with 80 points.

Stockport County faced Wycombe Wanderers in their play-off semi-final with the first match of the two-legged tie taking place at Adams Park in High Wycombe on 11 May 2008. Stockport went 1–0 down after a mistake from goalkeeper John Ruddy allowed Delroy Facey to score just before half-time. In the second half Stockport equalised on 82 minutes when Stephen Gleeson scored with a volley to make it 1–1. The second leg was held at Edgeley Park in Stockport six days later. Liam Dickinson scored the only goal of the game in the sixth minute after a solo run from the halfway line to tap the ball past Frank Fielding in the Wycombe goal. The home side confirmed their place in the play-off final with a 2–1 aggregate win.

Rochdale faced Darlington in their play-off semi-final, with the first leg being held away at Balfour Webnet Arena on 10 May 2008. Jason Kennedy opened the scoring for the home side with a lob in the 28th minute before Chris Dagnall equalised for Rochdale on 70 minutes when his shot was deflected into the net by a Darlington defender, wrong-footing the goalkeeper David Stockdale. Ian Miller won the game 2–1 for Darlington in the first minute of stoppage time with a header. The return leg was held at Spotland seven days later. Darlington opened the scoring in the 28th minute after Rene Howe impeded Kennedy in the penalty area, and Clark Keltie scored from the penalty spot. Rochdale drew level on 43 minutes through Chris Dagnall and then took the lead after a deflected strike from David Perkins found the net on 78 minutes. With the score at 2–1 after regular time, the aggregate scoreline was 3–3 and the match went into extra time, during which Perkins was sent off for dissent. No goals were scored during the additional period, so the match had to be decided by a penalty shootout. Rochdale scored all five of their penalties while Darlington's Kennedy missed his and sent Rochdale to the play-off final. After the game Rochdale failed in an appeal against the red card given to Perkins and he was subsequently unavailable for selection for the final.

== Match ==
=== Background ===
This was Stockport County's fifth appearance in the play-offs, having failed to make it past the semi-finals in 1990 and 1993 and losing both the 1992 Football League Third Division play-off final and the 1994 Football League Second Division play-off final. They had played in the fourth tier of English football since being relegated in the 2004–05 season. Rochdale were taking part in their second play-off having lost in the 2002 semi-finals 4–3 on aggregate to Rushden & Diamonds. They had played fourth-tier football since being relegated in the 1973–74 season. In the meetings between the sides during the regular season, Stockport County won both matches: a 2–1 victory at Spotland in November 2007 was followed by a 2–0 win at Edgeley Park the next March. Dickinson was Stockport County's top scorer during the regular season with 19 goals (all in the league), followed by Anthony Elding with 15 goals (13 in the league, 1 in the League Cup and 1 in the Football League Trophy) who had transferred to Leeds United in January 2008. Rochdale's leading scorers were Le Fondre with 17 goals (16 in the league, 1 in the FA Cup) and Glenn Murray with 10 (9 in the league, 1 in the League Cup).

The referee for the final was Stuart Attwell who was promoted to the Football League refereeing list ahead of the 2007–08 season, officiating his first match on 11 August 2007.

=== Summary ===
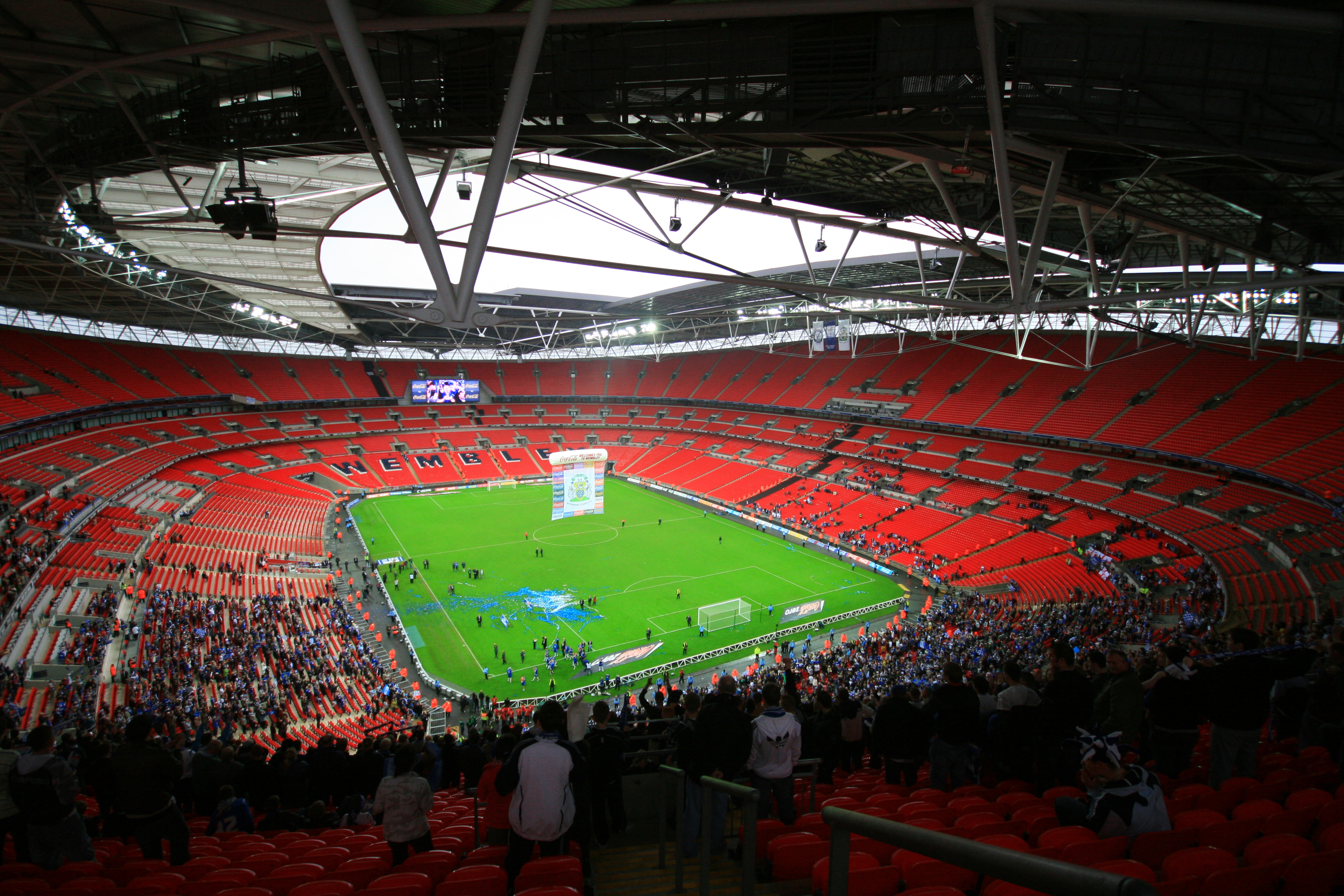
Wembley Stadium after as County celebrate their promotion

The match kicked off around 3 p.m. on 26 May 2008 at Wembley Stadium in front of a crowd of 35,715. Both sides had early periods of possession but neither could break the deadlock on a wet surface. Midway through the first half, a Chris Dagnall strike from distance took a deflection and passed just wide of the Stockport County goal. From the ensuing corner, Rory McArdle headed the ball in from close range at the near post to make it 1–0 to Rochdale in the 24th minute. Anthony Pilkington then struck a free kick narrowly wide of Rochdale's goal. In the 34th minute, Tommy Rowe played in a cross from a short corner which Nathan Stanton diverted into his own net for an own goal, to level the score and the sides went in at half-time at 1–1.

Rochdale made one change to their side during the interval, with Ben Muirhead coming on to replace Kallum Higginbotham. Four minutes into the second half, Stockport County took the lead once again when Pilkington headed Michael Rose's cross in from around 12 yards (11 m) after it had bounced off the ground. Gary Jones, the Rochdale captain, then saw his low shot go just wide of the Stockport County goal. Midway through the second half, Pilkington passed to Dickinson who had managed to evade his marker and struck the ball past the Rochdale goalkeeper Tommy Lee to make it 3–1. In the 77th minute, Adam Rundle reduced the deficit when he scored from around 18 yards (16 m) but no further goals were scored and the match ended 3–2 to Stockport County.

=== Details ===
26 May 2008

| Stockport County | 3–2 | Rochdale |
|---|---|---|
| Stanton 34' (o.g.); Pilkington 49'; Dickinson 67' | (Report) | McArdle 24'; Rundle 77' |

Wembley Stadium, London
Attendance: 35,715
Referee: Stuart Attwell (Warwickshire)

| Stockport County | Rochdale |

| GK | 26 | Conrad Logan (yellow card) |
| RB | 32 | James Smith |
| CB | 5 | Gareth Owen (c) |
| CB | 23 | Jimmy McNulty |
| LB | 3 | Michael Rose |
| DM | 8 | Gary Dicker |
| RM | 17 | Anthony Pilkington |
| LM | 21 | Tommy Rowe |
| CM | 19 | Stephen Gleeson | (substituted off) 75' |
| CM | 28 | Paul Turnbull |
| CF | 20 | Liam Dickinson | (substituted off) 89' |
Substitutes:
| DF | 16 | James Tunnicliffe |
| MF | 14 | Leon McSweeney | (substituted in) 75' (yellow card) |
| MF | 4 | Jason Taylor |
| MF | 10 | Matty McNeil | (substituted in) 89' |
| FW | 31 | Adam Proudlock |
Manager:
Jim Gannon

| GK | 32 | Tommy Lee |
| RB | 3 | Tom Kennedy |
| CB | 4 | Nathan Stanton | Booked |
| CB | 23 | Rory McArdle | Booked |
| CB | 2 | Simon Ramsden |
| LB | 12 | Nathan D'Laryea (substituted off) 73' |
| CM | 8 | Gary Jones (c) |
| CM | 11 | Adam Rundle |
| RF | 9 | Chris Dagnall |
| CF | 10 | Adam Le Fondre | | (substituted off) 57' |
| LF | 18 | Kallum Higginbotham | | (substituted off) 46' |
Substitutes:
| DF | 31 | Marcus Holness |
| MF | 5 | John Doolan |
| MF | 30 | Will Buckley | | (substituted in) 73' |
| FW | 24 | Rene Howe | | (substituted in) 57' |
| FW | 7 | Ben Muirhead | | (substituted in) 46' |
Manager:
Keith Hill

== Post-match ==
The Stockport County manager Jim Gannon reflected on his young side's success: "I hope that we become a role model for all clubs at this level ... Over the past two years we have brought through a group of young players who in the right circumstances, play really good, effective football." His counterpart Keith Hill was gracious in defeat, noting "I think that Stockport deserved it ... It could have gone either way and we gave it what we could but the lion's share of possession went to Stockport."

Stockport County's following season saw them deducted ten points for entering administration. As a consequence, they ended the season in eighteenth place in the table, three positions and one point above the relegation zone. In Rochdale's next season, they finished in sixth position and qualified for the 2009 Football League play-offs where they lost 2–1 on aggregate to Gillingham in the semi-final.

== See also ==
- 2008 Football League Championship play-off final
- 2008 Football League One play-off final
- 2008 Conference Premier play-off final
