= 2008 Football League play-offs =

Football League play-offs
- Season: 2007–08
- Champions: Hull City (Championship); Doncaster Rovers (League One); Stockport County (League Two)
- Matches played: 15
- Goals scored: 40 (2.67 per match)
- Biggest home win: Doncaster 5–1 Southend (League One)
- Biggest away win: Watford 0–2 Hull City (Championship); Carlisle United 0–2 Leeds (League One)
- Highest scoring: Doncaster 5–1 Southend (6 goals)
- Highest attendance: 86,703 – Bristol City v Hull (Championship final)
- Lowest attendance: 6,371 – Wycombe v Stockport (League Two semi-final)
- Average attendance: 25,469

The Football League play-offs for the 2007–08 season were held in May 2008, with the finals taking place at Wembley Stadium in London. The play-off semi-finals were played over two legs and were contested by the teams who finished in 3rd, 4th, 5th and 6th place in the Football League Championship and League One tables, and the 4th, 5th, 6th and 7th placed teams in League Two. The semi-final winners progressed to the finals, with the winner of each match earning promotion for the following season.

Hull City won promotion to the Premier League after defeating Bristol City in the Championship final, 1–0 with a goal from their leading scorer Dean Windass. This marked the Tigers' first entry to the top division of English football in their existence.

In the League One final, another 1–0 victory saw Doncaster Rovers promoted ahead of Leeds United. Stockport County defeated Rochdale 3–2 in the League Two final. This meant all three clubs who had finished immediately below the automatic promotion places in their divisions were promoted.

== Background ==
The Football League play-offs have been held every year since 1987. They take place for each of the three Football League divisions following the conclusion of the regular season and are contested by the four clubs finishing immediately below the automatic promotion places.

In the Championship, Hull City finished four points behind second-placed Stoke City, who were promoted with champions West Bromwich Albion. Bristol City - who were aiming to return to the top flight for the first time since 1980 - finished in fourth place in their first season at Championship level for nine years. The other entrants, Crystal Palace and Watford, had both played in the Premier League before, with Palace's last spell in the top division ending in a final day relegation in 2005, a year after having won the play-offs. Watford had been relegated from the top flight in the previous season, having finished bottom, and were looking to return at the first attempt.

== Championship ==
Pos	Team	Pld	W	D	L	GF	GA	GD	Pts
3	Hull City	46	21	12	13	65	47	+18	75
4	Bristol City	46	20	14	12	54	53	+1	74
5	Crystal Palace	46	18	17	11	58	42	+16	71
6	Watford	46	18	16	12	62	56	+6	70

=== Semi-finals ===
First leg

10 May 2008
12:15

Crystal Palace	1–2	Bristol City
Watson 87' (pen.)	Report	Carey 53'; Noble 90+2'

Selhurst Park, London
Attendance: 22,869
Referee: Mike Jones

11 May 2008
12:00

Watford	0–2	Hull City
	Report	Barmby 8'; Windass 23'

Vicarage Road, Watford
Attendance: 14,713
Referee: Kevin Friend

Second leg

13 May 2008
19:45

Bristol City	2–1 (a.e.t.)	Crystal Palace
Trundle 104'; McIndoe 110'	Report	Watson 24'

Ashton Gate, Bristol
Attendance: 18,842
Referee: Howard Webb

Bristol City won 4–2 on aggregate.

14 May 2008
19:45

Hull City	4–1	Watford
Barmby 43'; Folan 70'; Garcia 88'; Doyle 90'	Report	Henderson 12'

KC Stadium, Hull
Attendance: 23,155
Referee: Mark Clattenburg

Hull City won 6–1 on aggregate.

=== Final ===
24 May 2008
15:00

Bristol City	0–1	Hull City
	Report	Windass 38'

Wembley Stadium, London
Attendance: 86,703
Referee: Alan Wiley

== League One ==
Pos	Team	Pld	W	D	L	GF	GA	GD	Pts
3	Doncaster Rovers	46	23	11	12	83	47	+24	80
4	Carlisle United	46	23	11	12	64	46	+18	80
5	Leeds United	46	27	10	9	72	38	+34	76*
6	Southend United	46	22	10	14	70	55	+15	76

- Leeds United were docked 15 points by the Football League due to the club not following Football League rules on clubs entering administration.

=== Semi-finals ===
First leg

9 May 2008
19:45

Southend United	0–0	Doncaster Rovers
	Report

Roots Hall, Southend
Attendance: 9,109
Referee: Paul Taylor

12 May 2008
19:45

Leeds United	1–2	Carlisle United
Freedman 90'	Report	Graham 32'; Bridge-Wilkinson 50'

Elland Road, Leeds
Attendance: 36,297
Referee: Anthony Bates

Second leg

15 May 2008
19:45

Carlisle United	0–2	Leeds United
	Report	Howson 10', 90'

Brunton Park, Carlisle
Attendance: 12,873
Referee: Alan Wiley

Leeds United won 3–2 on aggregate.

16 May 2008
19:45

Doncaster Rovers	5–1	Southend United
Stock 11' (pen.); Barrett 21' (o.g.); Coppinger 39', 52', 80'	Report	Bailey 88'

Keepmoat Stadium, Doncaster
Attendance: 13,081
Referee: Mark Halsey

Doncaster Rovers won 5–1 on aggregate.

=== Final ===
25 May 2008
15:00

Doncaster Rovers	1–0	Leeds United
Hayter 48'	Report

Wembley Stadium, London
Attendance: 75,132
Referee: Andy D'Urso

== League Two ==
Pos	Team	Pld	W	D	L	GF	GA	GD	Pts
4	Stockport County	46	24	10	12	72	54	+18	82
5	Rochdale	46	23	11	12	77	54	+23	80
6	Darlington	46	22	12	12	67	40	+27	78
7	Wycombe Wanderers	46	22	12	12	56	42	+14	78

=== Semi-finals ===
First leg

10 May 2008
17:35

Darlington	2–1	Rochdale
Kennedy 28'; Miller 90'	Report	Dagnall 70'

Darlington Arena, Darlington
Attendance: 8,057
Referee: Paul Armstrong

11 May 2008
18:00

Wycombe Wanderers	1–1	Stockport County
Facey 37'	Report	Gleeson 82'

Adams Park, High Wycombe
Attendance: 6,371
Referee: Darren Deadman

Second leg

17 May 2008
12:00

Rochdale	2–1 (a.e.t.)	Darlington
Dagnall 43'; Perkins 78'	Report	Keltie 28' (pen.)
Penalties
Dagnall (penalty scored); Kennedy (penalty scored); Le Fondre (penalty scored); Jones (penalty scored); Muirhead (penalty scored)	5–4	(penalty scored) Guylain; (penalty scored) Purdie; (penalty scored) Wainwright; (penalty scored) Ravenhill; (penalty missed) Kennedy

Spotland, Rochdale
Attendance: 9,870
Referee: Richard Beeby

Rochdale 3–3 Darlington on aggregate. Rochdale won 5–4 on penalties.

17 May 2008
18:00

Stockport County	1–0	Wycombe Wanderers
Dickinson 7'	Report

Edgeley Park, Stockport
Attendance: 9,245
Referee: Andy D'Urso

Stockport County won 2–1 on aggregate.

=== Final ===
26 May 2008
15:00

Rochdale	2–3	Stockport County
McArdle 24'; Rundle 77'	Report	Stanton 34' (o.g.); Pilkington 49'; Dickinson 67'

Wembley Stadium, London
Attendance: 35,715
Referee: Stuart Attwell
