= Priso =

Priso is a Cameroonian surname. Notable people with the surname include:

- Carl Priso (born 1979), French footballer
- Dany Priso (born 1994), French rugby union player
- Emmanuel Ngom Priso (born 1984), Cameroonian-born French sprinter
- Marc Andre Manga Epresse Priso (born 1988), French footballer
- Njongo Priso (born 1988), Cameroonian footballer
- Ralph Priso (born 2002), Canadian soccer player

== See also ==
- Priso a Doo, Duala writer
