= Stephen Gleeson =

Irish footballer (born 1988)

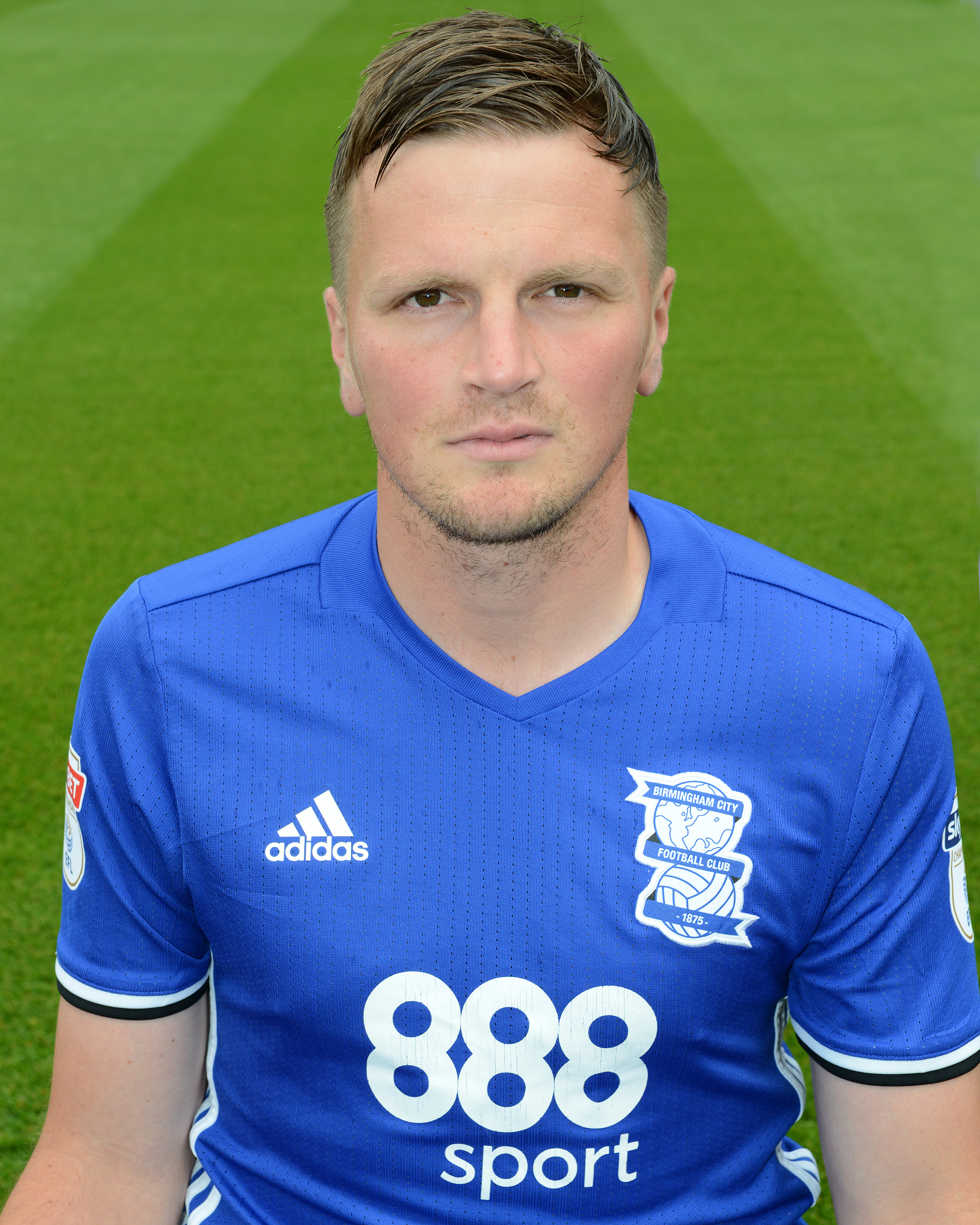
- Gleeson with Birmingham City in 2016

Personal information
- Full name: Stephen Michael Gleeson
- Date of birth: 3 August 1988 (age 38)
- Place of birth: Dublin, Ireland
- Height: 5 ft 9 in (1.75 m)
- Position: Midfielder

Team information
- Current team: Hitchin Town

Youth career
- Lourdes Celtic
- Cherry Orchard

Senior career*
Years	Team	Apps	(Gls)
2006–2009	Wolverhampton Wanderers	3	(0)
2006–2007	→ Stockport County (loan)	14	(2)
2008	→ Hereford United (loan)	4	(0)
2008	→ Stockport County (loan)	6	(0)
2008–2009	→ Stockport County (loan)	21	(2)
2009	→ Milton Keynes Dons (loan)	5	(0)
2009–2014	Milton Keynes Dons	169	(16)
2014–2018	Birmingham City	117	(6)
2018	Ipswich Town	10	(0)
2018–2020	Aberdeen	16	(0)
2020–2021	Solihull Moors	21	(1)
2021	Hemel Hempstead Town	5	(0)
2021–	Hitchin Town	53	(0)
2026–	Hemingfords United	6	(1)

International career
2004–2005	Republic of Ireland U17	5	(1)
2006	Republic of Ireland U18	2	(0)
2006–2007	Republic of Ireland U19	10	(0)
2007–2010	Republic of Ireland U21	16	(2)
2007–2017	Republic of Ireland	4	(1)
- * Club domestic league appearances and goals as of 12:45, 1 October 2023 (UTC)

Stephen Michael Gleeson (born 3 August 1988) is an Irish professional footballer who plays as a midfielder for Southern League Premier Division Central club Hitchin Town.

Gleeson played youth football in his native Dublin before coming to England at the age of 15 to join Wolverhampton Wanderers. He rarely played first-team football for them, but spent time on loan to lower-league clubs Stockport County (three separate spells), Hereford United and Milton Keynes Dons, before signing a three-year contract with the latter club in 2009. After five years, during which time he made more than 200 appearances in all competitions, Gleeson moved on to Birmingham City. He spent three and a half seasons at Birmingham, making more than 100 appearances in the Championship. He has since played for Ipswich Town, Aberdeen, Solihull Moors and Hemel Hempstead Town.

At international level, Gleeson was capped twice for the Republic of Ireland in 2007, and was not capped again for nearly ten years. He also represented his country at under-age levels, and made 16 appearances for the under-21 team.

== Club career ==
=== Early life and club career ===
Gleeson was born in Dublin, an only child, and raised in Crumlin, in the south of the city. As a youngster he admired Roy Keane, and tried to model his game on that of Steven Gerrard. He played for nearby Lourdes Celtic before moving on to Cherry Orchard. In the 2002–03 season, he scored a winning goal against a title rival to win the 14 Premier League, and scored with an "excellent volley" as Cherry Orchard won the SFAI under-15 Evans Cup the following year. Recommended to Wolverhampton Wanderers by their Irish scout, Willie Byrne, Gleeson came to England as a 15-year-old for a trial, and joined their academy.

He made his reserve-team debut on 24 August 2004 as a late substitute in their first home fixture of the season – three weeks after his 16th birthday – and by October 2004, he was starting. He helped Wolves' youth team reach the semifinal of that season's FA Youth Cup, but was sent off in extra time in the second leg, and Wolves lost on penalties to Southampton. He continued to appear regularly for the reserves. In 2005–06, he scored 4 goals from 16 reserve-team appearances, and at the beginning of May 2006, he signed his first professional contract, of three years. Describing him as a playmaker with "good pace [who] gets forward, with an eye for goal", academy manager Chris Evans said that Gleeson had trained with the first team "from time to time" and had impressed manager Glenn Hoddle.

=== First steps in senior football ===
Gleeson was given a first-team squad number for 2006–07, through by the time the season began, Hoddle had resigned and been replaced by Mick McCarthy. Gleeson joined League Two club Stockport County on a month's loan in November, with the aim of gaining experience and returning to Wolves to fight for a first-team place. An unused substitute in County's next match, Gleeson made his senior debut on 11 November in a 2–1 victory at Exeter City in the FA Cup, and his first appearance in the Football League came the following weekend in the starting eleven for a 1–1 draw away to Chester City. The loan was extended for a second month, and on 9 December, he scored his first senior goal, a header from Adam Proudlock's cross to complete a 5–2 win against Darlington. He said afterwards that he "just closed [his] eyes and hoped for the best". He thought his second goal had come a few days later, when his last-minute 30-yard (27 m) shot off the crossbar appeared to cross the line before bouncing out for Liam Dickinson to seal a 2–0 win against Notts County.

His loan was again extended, and by the time it expired he had made 17 appearances, scored again, with a tap-in as Stockport beat Wycombe Wanderers 2–0, and his manager was "sad to see him go, [but] also excited for him because he is going to have a great future in the game. He leaves as a better player with more self-confidence and one who deserves to play at a higher level." The supporters designated his final appearance, against Hereford United, "Stephen Gleeson Day".

McCarthy recalled Gleeson to Wolves to be part of the first-team squad, and he returned "bursting with confidence and desperate for a first team chance", only to find a winning team and strong competition for a place in midfield. He made the first-team bench for the first time on 3 March, and made his Wolves debut on 9 April, as a late substitute in a 3–1 defeat of Hull City. He made two more brief league appearances, and played for half an hour in the second leg of the play-off semi-final, which Wolves lost 4–2 on aggregate. He came close to creating a goal for his side when his long ball forward was deflected past Albion's goalkeeper by a defender, who managed to recover in time to clear it off the line.

=== More loan moves ===
After Gleeson's pre-season was disrupted by injury, he damaged a hip in the League Cup in late August, and a month later, he was allowed home leave to recover from concussion and a loss of feeling in the leg sustained in collision with the opposing goalkeeper in a reserve match. He captained the reserves, but made no more appearances for the first team before joining League Two club Hereford United on 21 February 2008 on a month's loan. Starting in central midfield against local rivals Shrewsbury Town, the Hereford Times reported that he "struggled to come to terms with the pace of the game during the first half but showed his quality in the second period", a performance that earned him a place in the League Two Team of the Week. In his second match, he should have done better with a shooting chance, and after the third, a defeat to promotion rivals Stockport, manager Graham Turner made several changes; Gleeson lost his place to first-team regular Toumani Diagouraga who returned after injury. Because Hereford had more loanees than the five permitted in the matchday squad, Gleeson was not always involved, but he did come back into the side as a second-half substitute on 22 March. Although Turner wanted to retain his services, he returned to Wolves and promptly rejoined Stockport until the end of the season, subject to a 24-hour recall clause.

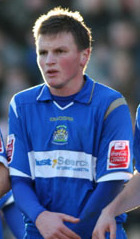
Gleeson with Stockport County in 2008

Gleeson played in six of Stockport's remaining seven regular-season league matches as they finished fourth, and faced Wycombe Wanderers in the play-off semi-final. In the first leg, at Wycombe's Adams Park ground, Stockport were a goal behind when half-time substitute Gleeson "sent an effort from 25 yards out spiralling past goalkeeper Frank Fielding with eight minutes remaining"; the Daily Telegraph's reporter termed it a "blistering" volley and a "piledriver". The goal was later voted Stockport's Goal of 2008 by fans. Early in the second leg, the danger from his "ridiculous" headed back-pass was only averted by his goalkeeper's agility, as Stockport went on to win the match 1–0. He started in the final, in which Stockport beat Rochdale 3–2 to win promotion to League One.

His association with Stockport continued the following season as he spent the first half of the campaign on loan with the club. Gleeson accused Wolves of "a bit of a bullying tactic" in trying to make him sign a contract extension before allowing him to move – he resisted, saying there was no hurry, and he would not sign unless the terms were acceptable – and was fined two weeks' wages for criticising the club. Stockport manager Gannon claimed the player had been so upset by the matter that he had considered giving up the game. He missed only four of Stockport's thirty matches during the loan spell: one while on international duty with the Ireland under-21 team and three while suspended after being sent off for an off-the-ball incident. He scored three goals – each time with a powerful shot from at least 15 yards (14 m) – and when his loan spell ended, the team were fifth in the division.

Gleeson returned to his parent club, and signed a one-year extension to his contract. Injuries and suspensions among the Wolves players prevented his going out on loan until late March, when he joined League One club Milton Keynes Dons for the remainder of the season. He provided two assists for Mark Wright as MK Dons won 2–0 at Southend United, and generally impressed "with his all-action performances and slick passing" in four consecutive wins, but on his fifth appearance, suffered ankle ligament damage that kept him out of their ultimately unsuccessful play-off campaign.

=== Milton Keynes Dons: the first three seasons ===
Following Wolves' promotion to the Premier League, Gleeson was made available for transfer. He had played under Roberto di Matteo's management while on loan at MK Dons, and despite Di Matteo's departure for West Bromwich Albion and replacement by Paul Ince, he signed a three-year contract with the club on 1 July 2009. the fee, officially undisclosed, was described as nominal. He was used in various midfield positions, including wide on the right, which was not to his taste, and at the base of a diamond, and was encouraged to break up play as well as perform his more accustomed creative role. After a 1–0 win against Wycombe Wanderers in September, Ince said that Gleeson "set the tempo for the game in the first minute with a great tackle and we just pushed on from there." MK Dons had begun the season as possible promotion contenders, but a strong start gave way to a slide into midtable, in which indiscipline was a factor. By mid-February, the team had received 100 yellow cards, far more than any other; Gleeson was a major contributor with 10, which earned him a two-match suspension. He was booked twice more before his season ended early when he damaged medial knee ligaments.

Gleeson's knee recovered in time for pre-season training, and he began the 2010–11 season in the unaccustomed position of right back, to which new manager Karl Robinson thought him well suited. He injured his back in his second appearance and was out of action for three months. When he did return, in his more usual position of central midfield, he "[showed] all his customary composure and quality in possession" in a friendly match, and went on to play in every competitive fixture until the final one of the regular season, for which, with a play-off place secure, Robinson selected a young team. He scored twice, the first a "wonder goal" from 30 yards (27 m) against Leyton Orient in January 2011 that won the club's Goal of the Season award. In the first leg of the play-off semi-final, MK Dons took a 3–1 lead, but with ten minutes left, Gleeson was sent off for bringing down Mark Little and a penalty was awarded and converted. The sending-off was rescinded on appeal, but Peterborough United won the second leg 2–0, qualifying for the final 4–3 on aggregate, and Gleeson and teammate Keanu Marsh-Brown came to blows in frustration. In June, Peterborough's reported £600,000 offer for Gleeson was rejected.

Gleeson was appointed vice-captain in July 2011. Both player and manager hoped the responsibility might curb his hot-headedness and help him mature. Early in the new season, he confirmed that he wanted to play at Championship level, so was not going to sign a new contract until he knew whether MK Dons were to be promoted or not. The club's website highlighted his central midfield partnership with Darren Potter, a new signing with whom Gleeson had played for Wolves' reserves and in international football, as integral to the team's good start to the season, and the pair helped MK Dons come close to eliminating Premier League Queens Park Rangers in the third round of the FA Cup. He played in 39 of the 46 League One matches and scored 5 league goals as the team were rarely out of the play-off positions, but indiscipline remained an issue. On 6 March, he returned from suspension for his tenth yellow card, only to be sent off for kicking an opponent late in the home defeat to Yeovil Town. After a lengthy talk with the player, manager Robinson stated publicly that if Gleeson did not learn from his mistakes, he would not be offered another contract. He and Potter were both named in the Professional Footballers' Association's League One Team of the Year, and together with winger Luke Chadwick were among the top ten players as chosen by the League One managers.

MK Dons narrowly failed to overcome a 2–0 deficit to Huddersfield Town in the second leg of the play-off semi-final. Gleeson was in tears afterwards, and Robinson said that the criticism he had received during the season for an apparent attitude problem was misplaced. According to the manager, his "[looking] like he's moody, doesn't care and only does it for himself" is a misperception; "he gets wrapped up the fact that he cares so much – sometimes he shows it in the wrong way." Despite interest from numerous Championship clubs, Gleeson signed a new two-year contract, saying that he wanted to play at that level with MK Dons and with Robinson.

=== Another two years ===
Robinson's team, built round Gleeson, Potter and Chadwick, were second in the table by the end of November. On 2 December 2012, Gleeson produced another goal from distance to open the scoring in MK Dons' first meeting with AFC Wimbledon. MK Dons won 2–1 to progress to the third round of that season's FA Cup, and the goal was voted the club's goal of the season. A couple of weeks later, he suffered a break in his left foot during training, which coincided with Chadwick damaging knee ligaments. During their absence, MK Dons dropped down the league. Gleeson returned in a match against Doncaster Rovers on 5 March 2013, which he celebrated with a goal to seal a 3–0 victory. Captaining the side in Dean Lewington's absence through injury in April, Gleeson scored a late winner against Brentford to lead the team to a second consecutive victory as they went on to finish four points outside the play-off places. Robinson speculated whether the disruption to the team caused by Gleeson's and Chadwick's injuries might have cost them promotion.

Early in the new season, Gleeson played an influential part in MK Dons twice coming from a goal behind to draw with Bristol City, "barking out orders and putting in the miles as he tracked box-to-box, popping up all over the pitch with vital tackles and hold-up play." In December, while still returning to form and fitness, he produced another "wonder goal" against Port Vale, and followed it up in the next week match a similar effort to open the scoring as MK Dons won 2–0 at Crawley Town. His performances and those of the team – their only defeat came in a match for which Gleeson was suspended, after a fifth yellow card received for unnecessary involvement in someone else's dispute in the Crawley match – earned him a nomination for League One Player of the Month. By the end of the season, Robinson suggested that the team had reached "a stage when some of the players have run their race here". Although he was "desperate" for Gleeson to stay, he was not prepared to be kept waiting for a decision.

=== Birmingham City ===
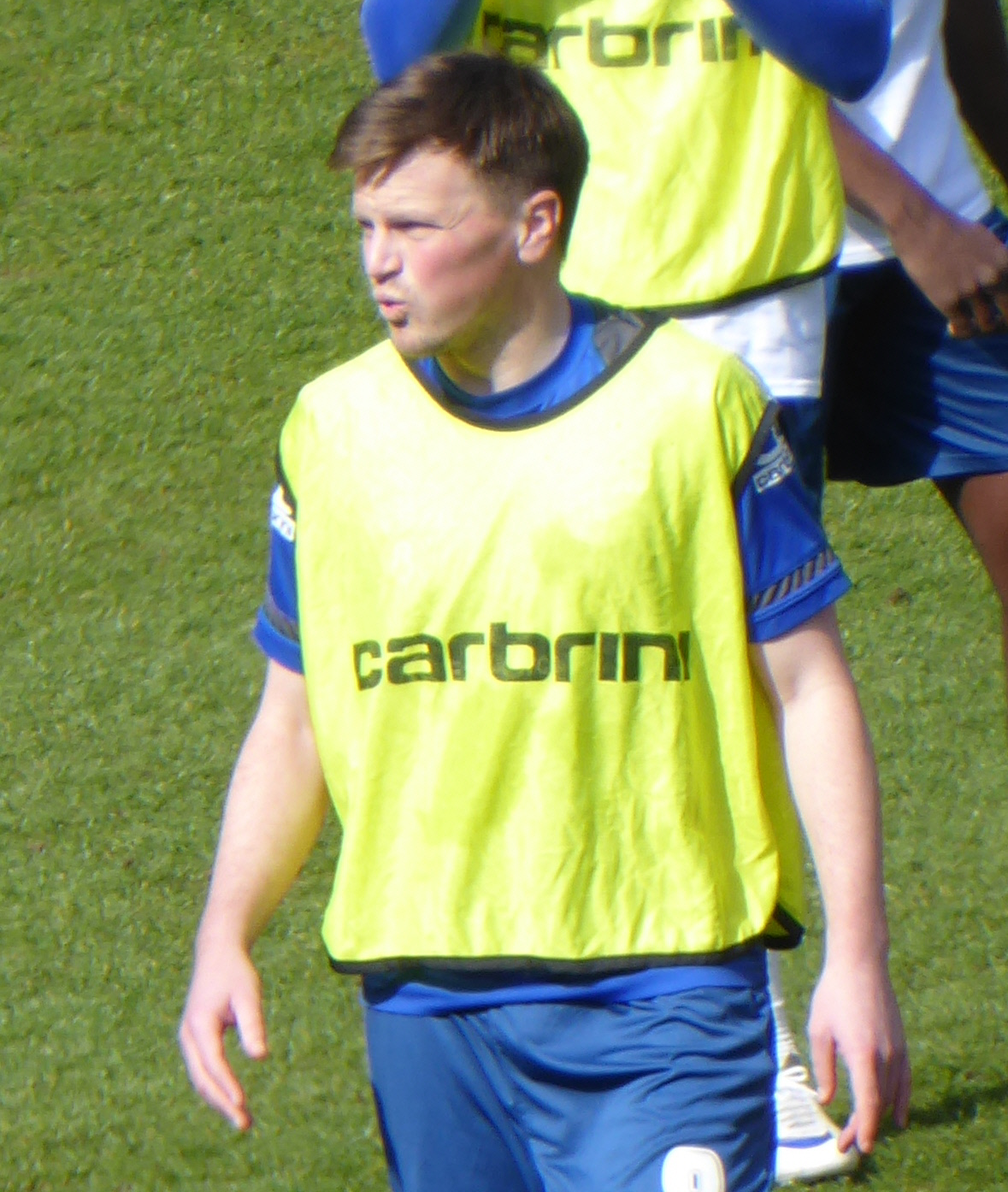
Gleeson before a Birmingham City match in April 2016

On 9 June, Gleeson signed a two-year contract with Championship club Birmingham City, to begin when his MK Dons contract expired at the end of the 2013–14 season. The Irish Independent's Daniel McDonnell suggested he was one of several Irish players who needed to prove themselves in the coming season. He made his debut in the starting eleven for the opening-day defeat at Middlesbrough, but failed to establish himself in the team: of the twelve league matches under Lee Clark's management, he started five and came on as a substitute in five as Birmingham dropped towards the relegation places. Clark's successor, Gary Rowett, included Gleeson in his first starting eleven, playing in front of the defensive line in a goalless draw at Wolverhampton Wanderers. This time, Gleeson did keep his place, tasked with "launching the counter-attacks" from Rowett's preferred 4–2–3–1 formation as his "effective midfield partnership" with David Davis started 18 consecutive league matches. Gleeson was sent off for retaliation in February 2016 as Birmingham beat Brentford, and new loan signing Robert Tesche of Nottingham Forest took his place alongside Davis. He returned to the side after his suspension as part of a three-man midfield, but when Rowett reverted to 4–2–3–1, it was Gleeson's passing that earned him selection ahead of Davis as Tesche's partner.

Ahead of the 2015–16 season, Gleeson signed a two-year extension to his contract that took its expiry date to 2018. Having gone through 2014–15 without scoring, he produced two goals in nine days in August 2015, contributing to his nomination for the Championship Player of the Month. The first came just before half-time at home to Derby County when his 30-yard (27 m) shot was deflected past the goalkeeper by a defender. For the second, away to his former club MK Dons, he curled Clayton Donaldson's cutback over the goalkeeper into the corner of the net; later in the match, he was stretchered off with an ankle injury that proved less serious than initially feared. He continued as first choice in a two-man midfield, generally partnering new signing Maikel Kieftenbeld, and according to the Birmingham Mail, was "arguably Blues' most important player, knitting together defence and attack and adding goals to his game". After an influential performance and a 25-yard (23 m) goal in a 5–2 win away to Fulham in November, Rowett sais he "[didn't] think there [was] a better passing defensive midfielder in the division." His celebration of a fortuitous goal in a 3–0 win at Derby earned him a booking for inciting the home supporters, and he apologised to the stewards after the match. Both his and the team's performances dipped towards the end of the season, which he finished with five goals from 46 appearances in all competitions.

Gleeson was linked with moves to other Championship clubs, including Leeds United, Reading and Sheffield Wednesday, during the close season, and his pre-season was disrupted by an infected toe, but he still began the new campaign in the starting eleven. His selection as a starter was intermittent, dependent on injuries – his own or others' – as well as on the sheer number of central midfielders available, especially after the creative Reece Brown returned to consideration. Playing a more advanced role in a 4–4–2 formation, Gleeson scored a winning goal against Blackburn Rovers in October, which preceded a run in the starting eleven, under both Rowett and his successor, Gianfranco Zola. As poor results continued, Zola introduced Tesche, whom he perceived as more capable defensively, and Gleeson started only one match in the last two months of the campaign.

=== Ipswich Town ===
Gleeson left Birmingham on a free transfer on 19 January 2018, and signed until the end of the season for another Championship club, Ipswich Town, under the management of Mick McCarthy who had given him his debut at Wolverhampton Wanderers. He made his first appearance the following day, as a half-time substitute in a 1–1 draw away to Bolton Wanderers, and according to McCarthy – perhaps in response to fans reportedly "underwhelmed" by the arrival of a fringe player from a struggling side – was "a mile above anyone else in terms of getting it and passing it." Facing strong competition for places in central midfield, his first-team appearances became infrequent – five starts and five as substitute – and he was not offered a new deal.

=== Aberdeen ===
Gleeson signed a two-year contract with Scottish Premiership club Aberdeen in June 2018. His contract was cancelled in January 2020.

=== Non-league football ===
Having played no competitive football since 2019, Gleeson signed a one-year contract with National League club Solihull Moors in August 2020. He made 21 league appearances before leaving the club when his contract expired at the end of the season.

Gleeson signed for Hemel Hempstead Town of the National League South ahead of the 2021–22 season. After recovering from injury, he made his debut on 21 August in a 3–0 home defeat to Braintree Town. He left the club at the end of September after making six appearances. He reappeared at Hitchin Town of the Southern League Premier Division Central in November.

== International career ==
Gleeson was capped at under-15 and under-16 level, before making his debut for the Republic of Ireland under-17 team in 2004. His Football Association of Ireland (FAI) profile described his performance in the first qualifying round of the 2005 UEFA European Under-17 Championship as outstanding. Ireland finished second in their group, so progressed to the elite round. Gleeson scored as his team beat Northern Ireland 2–1, but defeats to Serbia and Montenegro and England meant they failed to reach the tournament proper.

He first appeared for the under-19s at the age of 17 years 6 months – a year younger than most of his teammates – against Scotland in a friendly tournament at La Manga in February 2006. After a couple of appearances at under-18 level, Gleeson was included in the squad for that year's European Under-19 Championship elite qualification round. He started one match and played as a substitute in the other two; Ireland lost all three. He was vice-captain of the under-19 team as they reached the same stage of the 2007 competition, but withdrew from the qualifiers because of club commitments with Wolves in the Championship play-offs.

Gleeson was the youngest of eleven uncapped players included by Steve Staunton in the Ireland squad for a two-match visit to the United States in May 2007. He made his senior international debut as a 79th-minute substitute in a 1–1 draw with Ecuador at Giants Stadium on 23 May, and also played in the second match, a 1–1 draw with Bolivia, again as a substitute. Years later he admitted that "I don't think I did my best out there. I was a bit overawed: the senior team, 18 years of age, with all these names around me."

Three months later, Gleeson marked his under-21 debut with both goals in a 2–2 friendly draw with Germany. He went on to make 16 appearances at under-21 level, and captained the team in November 2009 in a 4–1 defeat against Armenia in a European Championship qualifier.

Despite his early introduction to the senior team, Gleeson was not called up again for nine years. He had previously expressed disappointment at his omission even when 40-man squads were named for Ireland matches, but in March 2016 manager Martin O'Neill selected him in the squad for friendlies against Switzerland and Slovakia. He was an unused substitute in both matches. Gleeson received a late call-up to the senior squad for a friendly at home to Iceland in March 2017, and this time did take the field, as a second-half substitute, winning his third cap nearly ten years after his second; Ireland lost 1–0. He was included in a weakened squad for two internationals in the United States in June, and on 1 June, he scored his first goal for Ireland, three minutes after coming on as a substitute in a 3–1 defeat to Mexico at the MetLife Stadium.

== Career statistics ==
=== Club ===
As of match played 7 October 2023

Appearances and goals by club, season and competition
Club	Season	League			National cup (Note: Includes FA Cup, Scottish Cup)		League cup (Note: Includes Football League Cup / EFL Cup, Scottish League Cup)		Other		Total	
Club	Season	Division	Apps	Goals	Apps	Goals	Apps	Goals	Apps	Goals	Apps	Goals
Wolverhampton Wanderers	2006–07	Championship	3	0	—		0	0	1 (Note: Appearance in Championship play-offs)	0	4	0
Wolverhampton Wanderers	2007–08	Championship	0	0	0	0	1	0	—		1	0
Wolverhampton Wanderers	2008–09	Championship	0	0	—		—		—		0	0
Wolverhampton Wanderers	Total		3	0	0	0	1	0	1	0	5	0
Stockport County (loan)	2006–07	League Two	14	2	3	0	0	0	0	0	17	2
Hereford United (loan)	2007–08	League Two	4	0	—		—		0	0	4	0
Stockport County (loan)	2007–08	League Two	6	0	—		—		3 (Note: Appearances in League Two play-offs)	1	9	1
Stockport County (loan)	2008–09	League One	21	2	3	1	1	0	1 (Note: Appearance(s) in Football League Trophy)	0	26	3
Stockport County (loan)	Total		27	2	3	1	1	0	4	1	35	4
Milton Keynes Dons (loan)	2008–09	League One	5	0	—		—		0	0	5	0
Milton Keynes Dons	2009–10	League One	29	0	3	0	0	0	4	0	36	0
Milton Keynes Dons	2010–11	League One	36	2	2	0	0	0	2 (Note: Appearances in League One play-offs)	0	40	2
Milton Keynes Dons	2011–12	League One	39	5	2	0	2	0	3 (Note: One appearance in Football League Trophy, two appearances in League One play-offs)	0	46	5
Milton Keynes Dons	2012–13	League One	30	6	3	1	3	0	1	0	37	7
Milton Keynes Dons	2013–14	League One	35	3	4	0	2	0	1	0	42	3
Milton Keynes Dons	Total		174	16	14	1	7	0	11	0	206	17
Birmingham City	2014–15	Championship	39	0	1	0	1	0	—		41	0
Birmingham City	2015–16	Championship	44	5	0	0	2	0	—		46	5
Birmingham City	2016–17	Championship	29	1	1	0	1	0	—		31	1
Birmingham City	2017–18	Championship	5	0	0	0	2	0	—		7	0
Birmingham City	Total		117	6	2	0	6	0	0	0	125	6
Ipswich Town	2017–18	Championship	10	0	—		—		—		10	0
Aberdeen	2018–19	Scottish Premiership	15	0	2	0	1	0	1 (Note: Appearance in UEFA Europa League)	0	19	0
Aberdeen	2019–20	Scottish Premiership	1	0	0	0	0	0	0	0	1	0
Aberdeen	Total		16	0	2	0	1	0	1	0	20	0
Solihull Moors	2020–21	National League	21	1	2	2	—		2 (Note: Appearance(s) in FA Trophy)	0	25	3
Hemel Hempstead Town	2021–22	National League South	5	0	1	0	—		0	0	6	0
Hitchin Town	2021–22	Southern League (SFL); Premier Division Central	16	0	—		—		3 (Note: Appearances in Herts Senior Cup)	0	19	0
Hitchin Town	2022–23	SFL Premier Division Central	29	0	1	0	—		1	0	31	0
Hitchin Town	2023–24	SFL Premier Division Central	8	0	2	0	—		3 (Note: One appearance in Herts Charity Cup, one in Herts Senior Cup, one in FA Trophy)	0	13	0
Hitchin Town	Total		53	0	3	0	—		7	0	63	0
Career total			444	27	30	4	16	0	26	1	516	32

=== International ===
As of match played 1 June 2017

International statistics
National team	Year	Apps	Goals
Republic of Ireland	2007	2	0
Republic of Ireland	2017	2	1
Total		4	1

=== International goals ===
Scores and results list the Republic of Ireland's goal tally first.

No	Date	Venue	Opponent	Score	Result	Competition	Ref
1	1 June 2017	MetLife Stadium, East Rutherford, United States	Mexico	1–3	1–3	Friendly	

== Honours ==
Stockport County

- Football League Two play-offs: 2008

Individual

- PFA Team of the Year: 2011–12 League One
