= Callum Warburton =

English footballer

Personal information
- Date of birth: 25 February 1989 (age 37)
- Place of birth: Stockport, England
- Position: Midfielder

Senior career*
Years	Team	Apps	(Gls)
2006–2008	Rochdale	4	(0)
2007	→ Northwich Victoria (loan)	2	(0)
2007	→ Kendal Town (loan)		
2008–2010	Kendal Town		
2010–2014	Stalybridge Celtic	47	(2)
- * Club domestic league appearances and goals as of 11:40, 19 January 2009 (UTC)

Callum Warburton (born 25 February 1989 in Stockport, England) is an English professional footballer who plays in centre midfield or occasionally at full back.

== Career ==
Warburton began his career as a trainee with Rochdale, turning professional in the 2006 close season. He made his first team debut as extra-time substitute, for Adam Rundle in Rochdale's 0–0 draw away to Hartlepool United, a game which Hartlepool eventually won 4–2 on penalties. His league debut came in the 1–0 defeat at home to Peterborough United on 9 December 2006 and he remained in the side until the end of the year. Out of the side and in need of further first-team experience, he joined Northwich Victoria in March 2007, playing twice before returning to Rochdale.

He joined Kendal Town on loan in August 2007 and after failing to feature for Rochdale was released in January 2008 when he joined Kendal on a permanent basis.
