= James Sharp (footballer, born 1976) =

English footballer

Personal information
- Full name: James Sharp
- Date of birth: 2 January 1976 (age 50)
- Place of birth: Reading, England
- Height: 6 ft 2 in (1.88 m)
- Position: Defender

Youth career
- Andover

Senior career*
Years	Team	Apps	(Gls)
2000–2003	Hartlepool United	49	(2)
2003–2005	Falkirk	34	(1)
2005	→ Brechin City (loan)	13	(1)
2005–2006	Torquay United	32	(0)
2006	Shrewsbury Town	0	(0)
2006–2007	Rochdale	12	(1)
2007–2008	Airdrie United	8	(0)
- * Club domestic league appearances and goals as of 19:18, 7 April 2008 (UTC)

James Sharp (born 2 January 1976) is an English professional football player, who played as a defender.

== Career ==
Sharp was a relative latecomer to the professional game, having signed his first contract at the age of 24, an event preceded by a spell at non-league Andover. He started his professional football career with Hartlepool United in 2000. After 60 appearances in three years with Hartlepool & a player of the year award, Sharp fell out of favour at Hartlepool and moved to Scottish club Falkirk on a free transfer in 2003.

After a year-and-a-half with the Bairns, Sharp was loaned out to Brechin City in February 2005 until the end of the season. In which time, Sharp helped Brechin to the Division 2 title along with picking up a winners medal for Falkirk in same season as Falkirk claimed the Division 1 title. Sharp made his return to England with a free transfer to Torquay United in August 2005. Playing in 32 league matches in the 2005-06 season, Sharp was named captain of the club, but was released at the season's end.

After spending pre-season training with the club, Sharp was signed by Shrewsbury Town on a one-month contract on 8 August 2006. However, on 24 August 2006, Sharp chose to terminate the contract to pursue other options. He had played just 10 minutes for Shrewsbury — the final ten minutes of the League Cup first round match at Birmingham City, where Birmingham won via a late goal.

Sharp was subsequently signed by Rochdale, debuting for them on 2 September 2006 in the 1–1 draw at home to Hereford United. His first goal for the club came against Shrewsbury, on 30 September, just a month after leaving them.

He was released by Rochdale at the end of the 2006-07 season and was signed by Scottish Second Division club Airdrie United. After a spell of 6 months with Airdrie, Sharp was forced to retire from the professional game through an achilles injury.
