= Carl Priso =

French footballer (born 1979)

Personal information
- Full name: Carl Yaya Priso
- Date of birth: 10 July 1979 (age 47)
- Height: 1.91 m (6 ft 3 in)
- Position: Forward

Senior career*
Years	Team	Apps	(Gls)
- Poissy
–2004	Red Star 93		
2004–2005	Chemnitzer FC	4	(0)
2005	Magna Grecia		
2005–2006	Torquay United	3	(0)
- * Club domestic league appearances and goals

Carl Yaya Priso (born 10 July 1979) is a French former professional footballer who played as a forward.

== Career ==
His professional football career began in France with Poissy, moving on to Parisian side Red Star 93 and German side Chemnitzer FC in July 2004. He played just four times for Chemnitz in the Regionalliga before joining Italian side Magna Grecia in January 2005.

Leroy Rosenior signed him on a free transfer for Torquay United in August 2005 at the same time as two other French players, Morike Sako and Mamadoli Sow. His Torquay debut came on 13 August 2005 in a 3–0 defeat away to Mansfield Town. He made two more first team appearances before a foot injury kept him out of action. He was one of six players transfer-listed by Rosernior in October 2005 and was released by new manager Ian Atkins at the end of the 2005–06 season without making any further appearances for the Gulls.

In October 2007, Priso joined Crawley Town on trial, playing in their Sussex Senior Cup win. Later that month he had trials with Shrewsbury Town and Oxford United.
