= Morike Sako =

French footballer (born 1981)

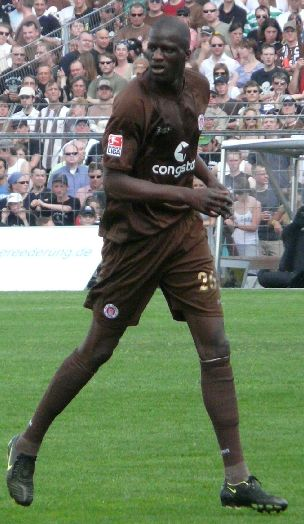
- Sako with FC St. Pauli in 2008

Personal information
- Date of birth: 17 November 1981 (age 44)
- Place of birth: Paris, France
- Height: 2.01 m (6 ft 7 in)
- Position: Forward

Youth career
- US Ivry

Senior career*
Years	Team	Apps	(Gls)
2003–2004	US Ivry		
2004–2005	SR Delémont	5	(1)
2005–2006	Torquay United	25	(3)
2006	Rochdale	17	(3)
2007–2010	FC St. Pauli	71	(8)
2009–2010	FC St. Pauli II	3	(4)
2010–2011	Arminia Bielefeld	10	(0)
2013–2014	Hessen Kassel	14	(3)
2013–2014	Eintracht Norderstedt	7	(0)
- * Club domestic league appearances and goals

Morike Sako (born 17 November 1981) is a French former professional footballer who played as a forward.

== Career ==
=== Early career ===
Born in Paris, Sako began his career in France with US Ivry, leaving in 2004 to join Swiss side SR Delémont.

=== Torquay United ===
Sako joined Torquay United in July 2005, one of three French players, the others being Mamadoli Sow and Carl Priso signed at the same time by then Torquay manager Leroy Rosenior. Sako was the most successful and popular of the three, playing 27 times and scoring three goals the following season, his league debut coming in a 3–0 defeat away to Mansfield Town on 13 August 2005. He was one of six players transfer-listed in October 2005 as Torquay struggled in the league, but regained his place in the side and was taken off the list in January 2006 after Rosenior had been replaced by John Cornforth. Torquay chairman Mike Bateson turned down an offer for Sako on the transfer deadline day at the end of that month. He was surprisingly released by new manager Ian Atkins at the end of the season, despite playing in some crucial games as Torquay successfully fought off relegation to the Conference National.

He had trials with a number of clubs after being released from Torquay, including League One clubs Bristol City and Blackpool.

=== Rochdale ===
In August 2006, Sako signed for League Two club Rochdale having impressed manager Steve Parkin.

At the end of December 2006, Sako left Rochdale after being told his contract would not be renewed. He played twenty times for the club, scoring three goals.

He was on then trial at League One club, AFC Bournemouth.

=== FC St. Pauli ===
In January 2007, Sako signed a short-term contract until the end of the 2006–07 season to play for German 2. Bundesliga club FC St. Pauli after rejecting an offer from League 2 side Bury. He later signed a contract with St. Pauli until the end of the 2008–09 season. Sako went on to play 71 matches for St. Pauli and to score eight goals. In the 2009–10 season, Sako helped St. Pauli to gain promotion to the Bundesliga.

=== Arminia Bielefeld ===
In September 2010, Sako signed a one-year contract with an optional year's extension with 2. Bundesliga side Arminia Bielefeld. He was released after one year, then spent two years without a club before signing for Hessen Kassel.

== Personal life ==
Sako is the older brother of Crystal Palace player Bakary Sako.
