= Liam Dickinson =

English footballer (born 1985)

Personal information
- Full name: Liam Michael Dickinson
- Date of birth: 4 October 1985 (age 41)
- Place of birth: Salford, England
- Height: 6 ft 4 in (1.93 m)
- Position: Striker

Youth career
- Blackpool
- Bolton Wanderers
- Blackburn Rovers

Senior career*
Years	Team	Apps	(Gls)
2002	Irlam		
2002–2003	Swinton Town		
2003–2004	Trafford	43	(11)
2004–2005	Woodley Sports	38	(9)
2005–2008	Stockport County	94	(33)
2008–2009	Derby County	0	(0)
2008	→ Huddersfield Town (loan)	13	(6)
2008	→ Blackpool (loan)	7	(4)
2009	→ Leeds United (loan)	8	(0)
2009–2010	Brighton & Hove Albion	27	(4)
2010	→ Peterborough United (loan)	9	(3)
2010–2011	Barnsley	3	(0)
2010	→ Walsall (loan)	4	(0)
2011	→ Rochdale (loan)	14	(0)
2011	Plymouth Argyle	0	(0)
2011–2012	Southend United	30	(10)
2013–2014	Stockport County	13	(1)
2014–2015	Stalybridge Celtic	32	(9)
2015–2016	Guiseley	44	(7)
2016	→ Bradford Park Avenue (loan)	6	(0)
2016–2017	Bradford Park Avenue	11	(2)
2016–2017	→ Stalybridge Celtic (loan)	10	(0)
2017–2018	Stalybridge Celtic	36	(11)
2018	FC United of Manchester	7	(1)
2018–2019	Droylsden		
- * Club domestic league appearances and goals

Liam Michael Dickinson (born 4 October 1985) is an English former professional footballer who played as a striker.

Dickinson began his senior career in non-league football with Irlam. He also played for Swinton Town, Trafford and Woodley Sports, before signing a professional contract with Stockport County in December 2005. He scored the winning goal in the 2008 League Two play-off final, before he won a £750,000 move to Derby County in July 2008. However, he never made a first team appearance for the "Rams", and instead spent time on loan at Huddersfield Town, Blackpool, and Leeds United, before transferring to Brighton & Hove Albion in July 2009. He spent time on loan at Peterborough United, before winning a £150,000 move to Barnsley in June 2010. He never started a league game for the "Tykes", and was instead loaned out to Walsall and Rochdale, before he was allowed to join Southend United via Plymouth Argyle in July 2011.

== Career ==
=== Early career ===
Dickinson began his career at Blackpool's Centre of Excellence, where he was offered a contract, but he chose instead to sign for Bolton Wanderers, before joining the Blackburn Rovers academy, where he was released at sixteen before signing a full-time contract. He then spent some time out of the game, working full-time as a graphic designer for a graphic design company and playing Sunday league football, before playing in the Manchester League with Irlam FC and then Swinton Town. When he was eighteen he started playing semi-professionally when he signed for North West Counties League club Trafford after a short trial in December 2003. He made 43 appearances for the club, scoring seven goals, until a move to Woodley Sports in 2004 where, despite injury problems, he scored nine goals in 38 appearances.

Dickinson later said of his early career, "Playing football on a Saturday was just an activity for me, a hobby, something you do for fun than an actual career prospect." He also reflected that "If I'd scored two goals in the old days it would have been straight to the pub for sausage and chips and a pint. Now it's a bottle of water and some wine gums – it's not quite the same."

=== Stockport County ===
After impressing during a trial in November 2005, Stockport County signed him for £2,000 in December. Though he was signed by Chris Turner, he found his way into the first team under new boss Jim Gannon. He made his debut on 2 January 2006 as a 71st-minute substitute against Cheltenham Town at Edgeley Park, scoring just five minutes later in a 2–2 draw. On 21 March 2006 he signed a contract extension with the club until July 2008. His tally of seven goals in the 2005–06 season played a large part in the club's survival in League Two.

He hit seven goals in 37 games for County in the 2006–07 season. He did not score until Boxing Day in a 2–0 win over Notts County, before adding six more before the end of the season. During the 2007–08 season he had his most prolific term as a Football League player, hitting the net 21 times from 32 starts and winning Stockport's Player of the year award in the process. He got the decisive goal against Wycombe Wanderers in the second leg of the play-off semi-final at Edgeley Park on 17 May. He then scored Stockport's winning goal in the play-off final against Rochdale at Wembley Stadium on 26 May, as Stockport won 3–2 and were promoted into League One.

=== Derby County ===
Dickinson signed for Derby County in July 2008 for a fee of around £750,000, becoming Paul Jewell's ninth signing of the 2008–09 pre-season. In order for Dickinson to gain more experience, Jewell sent him on an initial one-month loan to League One club Huddersfield Town, on 19 August 2008. He made his debut in Town's 3–1 defeat by Milton Keynes Dons on 23 August. His first goal for the "Terriers" came in their 2–1 defeat by Millwall on 30 August, in which he fired in a powerful overhead kick. On 13 September, he grabbed his first goal at the Galpharm Stadium when he scored to give Town the lead against Tranmere Rovers in what finished as a 2–1 defeat. Dickinson had his loan spell extended twice by manager Stan Ternent, before returning to Pride Park on 17 November. He said that the loan move reignited his love for the game.

On 27 November 2008, Dickinson signed for Championship rivals Blackpool on loan. Two days later he made a scoring debut for Blackpool, netting both of the "Seasiders" goals in their 2–1 victory over Plymouth Argyle at Home Park. His first came just three minutes after coming on as a second-half substitute for fellow loanee Steve Kabba. In his full home debut for Blackpool, on 6 December, Dickinson again scored twice in the second half as the "Tangerines" beat Charlton Athletic 2–0 at Bloomfield Road. Blackpool manager Simon Grayson said of Dickinson, "He has character and he's an honest lad. He's had a bit of a rollercoaster career but he might now have earned legend status here." Two days later Dickinson was named by the Football League in the Championship "Team of the Week". Interviewed by Sky Sports on 12 December, Dickinson said of his meteoric rise in football, "It's only three years ago, I was paying subs on a Sunday to play football and it's changed dramatically. To be at a massive club like Derby County and on loan to a big club like Blackpool, I have to pinch myself sometimes.". When Paul Jewell resigned as Derby manager on 28 December, the first move by caretaker manager Chris Hutchings was to recall Dickinson from his loan spell at Blackpool.

On the last day of the January 2009 transfer window Dickinson agreed to a loan move to Leeds United, where Simon Grayson was now manager, but the papers arrived at the Football League 14 minutes after the deadline. The transfer was thus void despite appeals to the Football League from Leeds. Negotiations between Leeds United and Derby County for Dickinson to sign on an emergency loan for 93 days continued and he was expected to move at the end of February, however the move was put on hold because he suffered an injury. He joined Leeds on loan for the rest of the season on 13 March 2009. However, he failed to score a goal whilst at Elland Road as the "Whites" failed to earn promotion out of League One. On his return to Derby, Dickinson was told he was not part of the plans at Derby and that it was likely he would be allowed to move on a season-long loan. On 3 July it was revealed that Dickinson was the subject of two 'small' bids from Norwich City, both of which were rejected, leaving Dickinson to criticise the club for placing an 'unrealistic' valuation on him.

=== Brighton & Hove Albion ===
In July 2009, Dickinson transferred to League One side Brighton & Hove Albion for £100,000, signing a three-year contract. After finding first-team opportunities difficult to come by, manager Gus Poyet allowed Dickinson to sign a loan deal with Championship side Peterborough United in February 2010, in a deal lasting until the end of the season. This move reunited him with former manager Jim Gannon. He hit three goals in nine games for the "Posh", whilst hitting six goals in 32 games for the "Seagulls". He left the Withdean Stadium not long after arriving back from London Road.

=== Barnsley ===
In June 2010, Dickinson transferred to Championship side Barnsley for an undisclosed fee, (thought to be in the region of £150,000) where he signed a two-year contract with an option for a third year. He was to feature just four times at Oakwell under manager Mark Robins. On 2 November 2010, he joined League One side Walsall on an emergency one-month loan. He played seven games for Chris Hutchings's "Saddlers", without finding the net.

On 6 January 2011, Liam joined Rochdale on a loan deal for the remainder of the season. He went on to play 14 League One games for Keith Hill's "Dale", again without finding the net. After his loan spell at Spotland ended, Dickinson was released from his contract at Barnsley.

=== Plymouth Argyle to Southend United ===
Dickinson agreed a contract with Plymouth Argyle on 5 July 2011, subject to the takeover of the club being completed. However, he was released from his contract on just eight days later, citing personal reasons. "Regrettably, we have agreed to a request from Liam to be released. We fully understand the reasons why," said acting chairman Peter Ridsdale, who further stated that "Liam has been a thorough professional in the short time he has been with us, and we hope that things will work out for him."

In July 2011, Dickinson signed a 12-month contract with League Two side Southend United, with the option of a further year. "Liam's a good size and he had a good goalscoring record in this division a few seasons ago with Stockport County," said manager Paul Sturrock. "That got him a big move to Derby but since then he's been a bit nomadic but we feel he has the attributes to be a success here." Injuries and suspensions caused him to miss the start of the season, and a broken ankle caused him to sit out the rest of the season from March onwards. He was also one of three players internally disciplined by the club for an unspecified incident at a hotel; the other two players were Ryan Hall and Kane Ferdinand. Despite these setbacks he still found the net 12 times in 37 games in 2011–12. Dickinson left Roots Hall at the expiry of his contract on 20 June, after the "Shrimpers" were unwilling renew his contract for a further year.

He joined Port Vale for training in July 2012, with manager Micky Adams wishing to review the player's fitness before offering a contract. However a permanent move to Vale Park seemed unlikely after a proposed takeover collapsed, leaving the cash-strapped club to start the upcoming season in administration. He then found himself unable to play during the 2012–13 season after breaking his ankle and undergoing surgery when the break failed to heal properly.

He returned to Vale Park for pre-season training in summer 2013, but after two friendly appearances Micky Adams stated that "Our interest in Liam is now finished, he has ongoing problems with his ankle. We wish him well."

=== Later career ===
While on loan at Bradford Park Avenue, Dickinson played against Boston United as a goalkeeper since none of the club's goalkeepers were available for the match and club could not make an emergency loan. He rejoined Stalybridge on 1 September 2017. In July 2018 he joined FC United of Manchester. In October 2018, he joined Northern Premier League side Droylsden.

== Style of play ==
"He's such a fantastic athlete, such a skilful forward that I don't think you can get any more in one player. He's got the height, he's got the athleticism, he's got the speed, he's got the skill, he's got the finishing and he also creates things.

— Manager Jim Gannon had a high respect for Dickinson – a respect that the player returned in kind.

== Personal life ==
He has picked up a reputation as a "wild boy" for his late night partying – his agent, Phil Sproson, said that the reason he regularly moved from club to club was because he was "no angel".

== Career statistics ==
Appearances and goals by club, season and competition
Club	Season	League			FA Cup		League Cup		Other		Total	
Club	Season	Division	Apps	Goals	Apps	Goals	Apps	Goals	Apps	Goals	Apps	Goals
Stockport County	2005–06	League Two	21	7	0	0	0	0	0	0	21	7
Stockport County	2006–07	League Two	33	7	1	0	1	0	2 (Note: Appearances in Football League Trophy)	0	37	7
Stockport County	2007–08	League Two	40	19	1	0	1	0	6 (Note: Three appearances in Football League Trophy, three appearances two goals in League Two play-offs)	2	48	21
Stockport County	Total		94	33	2	0	2	0	8	2	106	35
Derby County	2008–09	Championship	0	0	0	0	0	0	—		0	0
Huddersfield Town (loan)	2008–09	League One	13	6	0	0	0	0	0	0	13	6
Blackpool (loan)	2008–09	Championship	7	4	0	0	0	0	—		7	4
Leeds United (loan)	2008–09	League One	8	0	0	0	0	0	0	0	8	0
Brighton & Hove Albion	2009–10	League One	27	4	4	2	1	0	0	0	32	6
Peterborough United (loan)	2009–10	Championship	9	3	0	0	0	0	—		9	3
Barnsley	2010–11	Championship	3	0	0	0	1	0	—		4	0
Walsall (loan)	2010–11	League One	4	0	3	0	0	0	0	0	7	0
Rochdale (loan)	2010–11	League One	14	0	0	0	0	0	0	0	14	0
Southend United	2011–12	League Two	30	10	3	1	1	0	3	1	37	12
Stockport County	2013–14	Conference North	13	1	0	0	—		0	0	13	1
Stalybridge Celtic	2013–14	Conference North	12	4	0	0	—		0	0	12	4
Stalybridge Celtic	2014–15	Conference North	20	5	1	0	—		3 (Note: Two appearances one goal in FA Trophy, one appearance in Cheshire Senior Cup)	1	24	6
Stalybridge Celtic	Total		32	9	1	0	—		3	1	36	10
Guiseley	2014–15	Conference North	13	1	0	0	—		3 (Note: Appearances in Conference North play-offs)	1	16	2
Guiseley	2015–16	National League	31	6	2	0	—		5 (Note: Appearances in FA Trophy)	0	38	6
Guiseley	Total		44	7	2	0	—		8	1	54	8
Bradford (Park Avenue)	2015–16 (Note: This season was spent on loan from Guiseley)	National League North	6	0	0	0	—		0	0	6	0
Bradford (Park Avenue)	2016–17	National League North	11	2	0	0	—		0	0	11	2
Bradford (Park Avenue)	Total		17	2	0	0	—		0	0	17	2
Stalybridge Celtic	2016–17 (Note: This season was spent on loan from Bradford (Park Avenue))	National League North	10	0	0	0	—		3 (Note: Two appearances in FA Trophy, one appearance in Cheshire Senior Cup)	0	13	0
Stalybridge Celtic	2017–18	Northern Premier League Premier Division	36	11	2	2	—		6 (Note: Four appearances two goals in FA Trophy, two appearances in Cheshire Senior Cup)	2	44	15
Stalybridge Celtic	Total		46	11	2	2	—		9	2	57	15
FC United of Manchester	2018–19	National League North	7	1	0	0	—		0	0	7	1
Career total			368	91	17	5	5	0	31	7	421	103

== Honours ==
Stockport County

- Football League Two play-offs: 2008

Guiseley

- Conference North play-offs: 2015

Individual

- Stockport County Player of the Season: 2007–08
