= Clive Moyo-Modise =

English footballer

Personal information
- Full name: Clive Zwelibanzi Moyo-Modise
- Date of birth: 24 September 1984 (age 42)
- Place of birth: London, England
- Positions: Midfielder; striker

Senior career*
Years	Team	Apps	(Gls)
2005–2007	Rochdale	28	(1)
2007	→ Mossley (loan)		
2007–2008	Bidvest Wits		
2008–2009	Mossley		
2010	Altrincham	4	(0)
2010–????	Ashton United		
- * Club domestic league appearances and goals as of 16:42, 18 July 2016 (UTC)

Clive Zwelibanzi Moyo-Modise (born 24 September 1984) is a footballer who played as a midfielder or striker.

== Career ==
Born in London, Moyo-Modise started his career with Rochdale in 2005 and scored his first senior professional goal of his career against Darlington on 6 October 2006. He scored the fifth goal in a game Rochdale won 5–0 at the 96.6 TFM Arena in Darlington. Whilst there he attracted a number of clubs in the higher leagues including Liverpool and Bolton. He scored the only goal in the Senior Lancashire Cup Final in 2005/06 season.

In early November, Moyo-Modise was called up to the South African under-21s side, but had to pull put of the squad due to a hamstring injury. Although born in England, Moyo-Modise qualifies internationally for South Africa due to his parents. He later in his playing spell in South Africa, played for the national Under-23 team. He scored on his debut in the 3–1 loss against Cameroon in the Sasol Eight Nations Tournament held in Johannesburg. He also received a senior national call up from Carlos Alberto Parreira (World Cup winning coach) for a 2-week training camp in Johannesburg early 2008.

On 9 February 2007, Moyo-Modise joined Mossley on loan initially for a month. After scoring 5 goals in 7 matches, his loan was extended until the end of the season at the Northern Premier League Premier Division club.

He left Rochdale on 11 May 2007 and later joined South African Premier Soccer League side Bidvest Wits.

Moyo-Modise spent just a season at Wits after arriving from England scoring three times while playing as a winger. He was offered a contract by Golden Arrows in mid September but rejected to go back to England for family reasons.

He had a successful trial at cash strapped Stockport County in March 2009, but was unable to sign as club was bound for administration.

On 11 February 2010, Moyo-Modise joined Conference National side Altrincham on a free transfer before leaving to search for regular first team football on 19 March 2010. He signed forms with Ashton United on 1 March 2010, initially on dual-registration.
