= Nathan Stanton =

English footballer

Personal information
- Date of birth: 4 May 1981 (age 45)
- Place of birth: Nottingham, England
- Height: 5 ft 9 in (1.75 m)
- Position: Centre back

Senior career*
| Years | Team | Apps | (Gls) |
| 1998–2006 | Scunthorpe United | 237 | (0) |
| 2006–2010 | Rochdale | 139 | (0) |
| 2010–2013 | Burton Albion | 62 | (1) |
| 2013–2014 | Grantham Town | 19 | (0) |
| 2014 | Corby Town | 15 | (0) |
| Total | | 472 | (1) |
- * Club domestic league appearances and goals

Nathan Stanton (born 4 May 1981) is an English former professional footballer who is currently employed as the kit manager at Scunthorpe United, whom he notably represented as a player between 1998 and 2006.

In his playing career, Stanton made 237 league appearances for Scunthorpe, later playing for Rochdale, Burton Albion, and Grantham Town before retiring after a brief stint with Corby Town in 2014.

== Club career ==
=== Scunthorpe United ===
Born in Nottingham, Stanton began his career with Scunthorpe United, A former Scunthorpe United trainee, he scored one goal for the club, his strike coming against Lincoln City in the 2003 League Two Play Off Semi Final. Injuries limited his appearances for the club, and he was released on a free transfer in the summer of 2006.

=== Rochdale ===
Stanton signed for Rochdale on a one-year contract in July 2006.

In January 2008, he signed a two-year contract extension.

=== Burton Albion ===
Stanton joined Burton Albion in a two-year contract in July 2010, after he rejected the offer of a new deal from Rochdale. He agreed a new one-year contract in May 2012. After 62 appearances in 3 seasons, Stanton was released at the end of the 2012–2013 season.

=== Grantham Town ===
He joined Grantham Town ahead of the 2013/14 Northern Premier League season, where he was named as an unused sub on the opening day.

=== Corby Town ===
Stanton joined Corby Town in January 2014. He made his Corby Town debut away at Weymouth.

== Career statistics ==
Appearances and goals by club, season and competition
| Club | Season | League | | | FA Cup | | League Cup | | Other | | Total | |
| Club | Season | Division | Apps | Goals | Apps | Goals | Apps | Goals | Apps | Goals | Apps | Goals |
|---|---|---|---|---|---|---|---|---|---|---|---|---|
| Scunthorpe United | 1997–98 | Third Division | 1 | 0 | 0 | 0 | 0 | 0 | 0 | 0 | 1 | 0 |
| Scunthorpe United | 1998–99 | Third Division | 4 | 0 | 0 | 0 | 0 | 0 | 0 | 0 | 4 | 0 |
| Scunthorpe United | 1999–2000 | Second Division | 34 | 0 | 1 | 0 | 1 | 0 | 2 (Note: Appearance(s) in Football League Trophy) | 0 | 38 | 0 |
| Scunthorpe United | 2000–01 | Third Division | 38 | 0 | 5 | 0 | 2 | 0 | 1 | 0 | 46 | 0 |
| Scunthorpe United | 2001–02 | Third Division | 42 | 0 | 3 | 0 | 1 | 0 | 3 | 0 | 49 | 0 |
| Scunthorpe United | 2002–03 | Third Division | 42 | 0 | 4 | 0 | 1 | 0 | 3 (Note: 1 appearance(s) in Football League Trophy, 2 appearances and one goal in Division Three play-offs) | 1 | 50 | 1 |
| Scunthorpe United | 2003–04 | Third Division | 33 | 0 | 4 | 0 | 1 | 0 | 2 | 0 | 40 | 0 |
| Scunthorpe United | 2004–05 | League Two | 21 | 0 | 0 | 0 | 1 | 0 | 1 | 0 | 23 | 0 |
| Scunthorpe United | 2005–06 | League One | 22 | 0 | 1 | 0 | 2 | 0 | 0 | 0 | 25 | 0 |
| Scunthorpe United | Total | | 237 | 0 | 18 | 0 | 9 | 0 | 12 | 1 | 276 | 1 |
| Rochdale | 2006–07 | League Two | 35 | 0 | 2 | 0 | 1 | 0 | 1 | 0 | 39 | 0 |
| Rochdale | 2007–08 | League Two | 27 | 0 | 1 | 0 | 0 | 0 | 2 (Note: 2 appearances in League Two play-offs) | 0 | 30 | 0 |
| Rochdale | 2008–09 | League Two | 39 | 0 | 2 | 0 | 1 | 0 | 4 (Note: 2 appearances in Football League Trophy, 2 appearances in League Two play-offs) | 0 | 46 | 0 |
| Rochdale | 2009–10 | League Two | 38 | 0 | 0 | 0 | 1 | 0 | 0 | 0 | 39 | 0 |
| Rochdale | Total | | 139 | 0 | 5 | 0 | 3 | 0 | 7 | 0 | 154 | 0 |
| Burton Albion | 2010–11 | League Two | 22 | 0 | 4 | 0 | 1 | 0 | 1 | 0 | 28 | 0 |
| Burton Albion | 2011–12 | League Two | 22 | 0 | 1 | 0 | 1 | 0 | 0 | 0 | 24 | 0 |
| Burton Albion | 2012–13 | League Two | 18 | 1 | 2 | 0 | 2 | 0 | 0 | 0 | 22 | 1 |
| Burton Albion | Total | | 62 | 1 | 7 | 0 | 4 | 0 | 1 | 0 | 74 | 1 |
| Career total | | | 438 | 1 | 30 | 0 | 16 | 0 | 20 | 1 | 504 | 2 |

== Honours ==
Individual

- PFA Team of the Year: 2003–04 Third Division
