= John Doolan (footballer, born 1974) =

English footballer and coach

Personal information
- Full name: John Doolan
- Date of birth: 7 May 1974 (age 52)
- Place of birth: Liverpool, England
- Position: Central midfielder

Senior career*
Years	Team	Apps	(Gls)
1992–1994	Everton	0	(0)
1994–1998	Mansfield Town	131	(10)
1998–2003	Barnet	182	(12)
2003–2005	Doncaster Rovers	84	(2)
2005–2006	Blackpool	19	(0)
2006–2008	Rochdale	83	(3)
2008–2009	Southport	4	(0)
Total		503	(27)
- * Club domestic league appearances and goals

John Doolan (born 7 May 1974) is an English football coach and former player.

== Club career ==
Doolan began his career as a trainee with the club he supports, Everton in 1992. He was released by Everton and joined Football League Third Division side Mansfield Town on a free transfer in September 1994. He made 151 appearances in all competitions for Mansfield in four seasons, scoring 14 goals, before joining Football League Third Division team Barnet in 1998. He signed for £60,000 and made 199 appearances in all competitions for Barnet, scoring 13 goals, in five seasons during which Barnet were relegated to the Football Conference in May 2001.

Doolan joined Football Conference side Doncaster Rovers for a nominal fee in March 2003. He made eight appearances in the remainder of the 2002–03 season as Doncaster went on to win the Conference play-off final and promotion to the Football League Third Division in May 2003. He became a regular in the first team in the 2003–04 season, making 41 league and cup appearances, scoring three goals, as Doncaster won promotion for the second successive year as Football League Third Division champions. He signed a new contract in December 2003, keeping him at Doncaster until 2005. He made 41 appearances, scoring three goals, in all competitions in the 2004–05 season as Doncaster finished in mid-table in Football League One.

Doolan joined Football League One club, Blackpool, on a one-year contract, when his contract with Doncaster expired in June 2005. He made 24 appearances for Blackpool in all competitions in the 2005–06 season, but was allowed to leave in January 2006 to join Football League Two side, Rochdale, on loan before signing a permanent contract with them ten days later. He made 18 appearances in the remainder of the 2005–06 season as Rochdale finished in mid-table. He made 44 league and cup appearances in the 2006–07 season. In the 2007–08 season he made 28 appearances as Rochdale made the play-offs, including coming on an extra-time substitute in their 2–1 play-off semi-final victory over Darlington.

== Coaching career ==
In May 2008 Doolan left Rochdale to take up a player-coach role at Conference North side Southport. He left Southport in February 2009 after an agreement with the manager Liam Watson. During his time as Southport player-coach, he was also employed as a youth coach at Everton. He remained at Everton following the end of his playing career and assisted the Everton U18 team during the 2014–15 season. He went onto coach the U16s, and holds a UEFA A Coaching License.

== Honours ==
Doncaster Rovers

- Football League Third Division: 2003–04
