= Rory McArdle =

Association football player (born 1987)

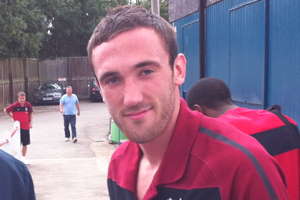
- McArdle in 2010

Personal information
- Full name: Rory Alexander McArdle
- Date of birth: 1 May 1987 (age 39)
- Place of birth: Sheffield, England
- Height: 6 ft 1 in (1.85 m)
- Position: Defender

Senior career*
Years	Team	Apps	(Gls)
2004–2007	Sheffield Wednesday	1	(0)
2005–2006	→ Rochdale (loan)	19	(1)
2006–2007	→ Rochdale (loan)	9	(0)
2007–2010	Rochdale	125	(5)
2010–2012	Aberdeen	53	(2)
2012–2017	Bradford City	183	(12)
2017–2020	Scunthorpe United	100	(4)
2020–2021	Exeter City	21	(1)
2021–2023	Harrogate Town	35	(1)
Total		546	(26)

International career
	Northern Ireland U19	11	(0)
2006–2008	Northern Ireland U21	19	(1)
2010–2014	Northern Ireland	7	(0)
- * Club domestic league appearances and goals

Rory Alexander McArdle (born 1 May 1987) is a former professional footballer who played as a defender for Sheffield Wednesday, Rochdale, Aberdeen, Bradford City, and Scunthorpe United. Born in England, he made seven appearances for the Northern Ireland national team.

== Club career ==
=== Aberdeen ===
On 19 May 2010, McArdle signed a contract with Scottish Premier League club Aberdeen. Near the end of the 2011–12 season, McArdle was advised that his contract with Aberdeen would not be extended.

=== Bradford City ===
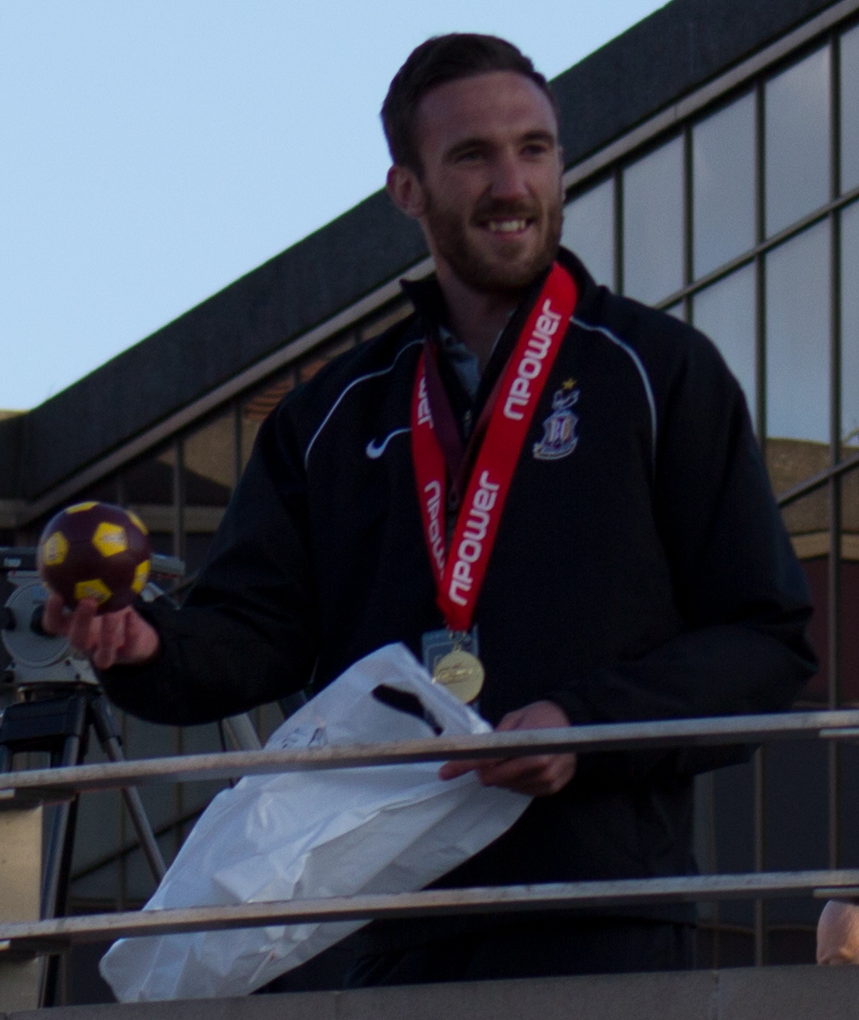
McArdle with the victory parade that followed Bradford City's victory in the 2013 Football League Two play-off final

McArdle signed for Bradford City on 6 June 2012, signing a two-year contract. He made his debut on 11 August in a 1–0 win in the League Cup against Notts County. He made his league debut a week later against Gillingham. He made his home debut on 21 August, in a 1–0 win against Fleetwood Town. He scored his first goal for the club on 25 August in a 5–1 win against AFC Wimbledon. On 8 January, McArdle scored a header against Premier League side Aston Villa in the first leg of the semi-final of the League Cup, as Bradford incredibly won 3–1. He also played in the second leg, which saw Bradford advance to the final 4–3 on aggregate. He started in the final which Bradford lost to Premier League side Swansea City. He scored his second league goal for the club on 1 April, helping Bradford to a 3–1 away to Torquay United. He then scored in the 2013 Football League Two play-off final, which Bradford won 3–0 against Northampton Town securing promotion to League One. On 3 August, the opening day of the season, McArdle scored a late header from a Raffaele De Vita corner to give Bradford a point in a 2–2 draw against Bristol City.

He was Bradford City's 2014–15 Player of the Year.

=== Scunthorpe United ===
McArdle signed a three-year deal with fellow League One club Scunthorpe United on 21 June 2017, with the deal coming into effect from 1 July 2017.

=== Exeter City ===
On 19 May 2020, McArdle signed a contract with League Two club Exeter City. He scored his first goal for the club in February 2021, a 'trademark near-post header' in a 1–0 win over Stevenage.

=== Harrogate Town ===
On 30 June 2021, McArdle joined fellow League Two club Harrogate Town for an undisclosed fee. McArdle signed a new one-year deal in May 2022.

McArdle retired at the end of the 2022–23 season.

== International career ==
McArdle made his full debut for Northern Ireland on 26 May 2010 against Turkey in a friendly.

== Career statistics ==
Appearances and goals by club, season and competition
Club	Season	League			National cup		League cup		Other		Total	
Club	Season	Division	Apps	Goals	Apps	Goals	Apps	Goals	Apps	Goals	Apps	Goals
Rochdale (loan)	2005–06	League Two	19	1	1	0	0	0	0	0	20	1
Sheffield Wednesday	2006–07	Championship	1	0	0	0	1	0	0	0	2	0
Rochdale (loan)	2006–07	League Two	25	0	1	0	—		0	0	26	0
Rochdale	2007–08	League Two	46	3	1	0	2	0	0	0	49	3
Rochdale	2008–09	League Two	43	2	3	0	1	0	2 (Note: Appearances in the Football League Trophy)	0	49	2
Rochdale	2009–10	League Two	20	0	2	0	0	0	0	0	22	0
Rochdale	Total		109	5	6	0	3	0	2	0	120	5
Aberdeen	2010–11	Scottish Premier League	28	2	4	1	4	1	0	0	36	4
Aberdeen	2011–12	Scottish Premier League	25	0	5	0	2	1	0	0	32	1
Aberdeen	Total		53	2	9	1	6	2	0	0	68	5
Bradford City	2012–13	League Two	40	2	4	0	8	1	4 (Note: One appearance in the Football League Trophy and three in the League Two play-offs)	1	56	4
Bradford City	2013–14	League One	41	3	1	0	0	0	1	0	43	3
Bradford City	2014–15	League One	43	3	8	0	3	0	1	0	55	3
Bradford City	2015–16	League One	35	3	5	0	1	0	3 (Note: One appearance in Football League Trophy and two in League One play-offs)	0	44	3
Bradford City	2016–17	League One	24	1	1	0	0	0	8 (Note: Five appearances in EFL Trophy and three in League One play-offs)	1	33	2
Bradford City	Total		183	12	19	0	12	1	17	2	231	15
Scunthorpe United	2017–18	League One	36	1	3	0	2	0	2 (Note: Appearances in League One play-offs)	0	43	1
Scunthorpe United	2018–19	League One	38	0	2	0	1	0	2	0	43	0
Scunthorpe United	2019–20	League Two	26	3	1	0	1	0	3	0	31	3
Scunthorpe United	Total		100	4	6	0	4	0	7	0	117	4
Exeter City	2020–21	League Two	21	1	3	0	1	0	2	0	27	1
Harrogate Town	2021–22	League Two	23	1	1	0	0	0	2	0	26	1
Harrogate Town	2022–23	League Two	12	0	1	0	0	0	0	0	13	0
Harrogate Town	Total		35	1	2	0	0	0	2	0	39	1
Career total			546	26	47	1	27	3	30	2	652	32

== Honours ==
Bradford City

- Football League Two play-offs: 2013
- Football League Cup runner-up: 2012–13
