= Keith Hill (footballer) =

English footballer and manager

Personal information
- Full name: Keith John Hill
- Date of birth: 17 May 1969 (age 57)
- Place of birth: Bolton, Lancashire, England
- Height: 6 ft 0 in (1.83 m)
- Position: Centre back

Senior career*
Years	Team	Apps	(Gls)
1987–1992	Blackburn Rovers	96	(4)
1992–1996	Plymouth Argyle	123	(2)
1996–2001	Rochdale	154	(4)
2001–2002	Cheltenham Town	5	(0)
2001	→ Wrexham (loan)	12	(1)
2002–2003	Morecambe	20	(0)
Total		410	(11)

Managerial career
- 2006–2011: Rochdale
- 2011–2012: Barnsley
- 2013–2019: Rochdale
- 2019–2020: Bolton Wanderers
- 2020–2021: Tranmere Rovers
- 2021–2022: Scunthorpe United
- * Club domestic league appearances and goals

Keith John Hill (born 17 May 1969) is an English professional former footballer and football manager who was most recently manager of National League club Scunthorpe United.

In a 16-year-long playing career, Hill was a centre back who represented Blackburn Rovers, Plymouth Argyle, Rochdale, Cheltenham Town, Wrexham and Morecambe.

After retiring as a player, he went into coaching at Rochdale, and was twice the club's manager until sacked in March 2019. Following this, he endured a difficult spell as manager of hometown club Bolton Wanderers following their points deduction. He was appointed manager of Tranmere Rovers on 21 November 2020, but was sacked after the team reached the League Two play-offs in May 2021.

== Playing career ==
Hill began his career with Blackburn Rovers, moving on to Plymouth Argyle in 1992 in a joint deal with Craig Skinner, with Nicky Marker moving in the opposite direction. Hill spent four years with Plymouth, moving on to Rochdale in 1996. After five years at Spotland, he joined Cheltenham Town, but he only spent a year there, playing only five matches, punctuated by a two-month loan with Wrexham. He then spent a year with Football Conference club Morecambe.

== Managerial career ==
=== Rochdale ===
Following Hill's retirement from playing, he joined former club Rochdale's coaching staff, where he held the position of Director of Youth. On 17 December 2006, Hill was appointed as caretaker manager, following the sacking of Steve Parkin. His first match in charge against Milton Keynes Dons ended a 2–1 loss and they were left in the League Two relegation zone. His first win came two matches into his reign, a 4–0 win over Boston United, which lifted them out of the relegation zone. After his second 4–0 win, Rochdale appointed Hill as permanent manager on 3 January 2007. Rochdale ended the season in ninth, despite being in the bottom three for the majority of the first half of the season.

In his first full season as Dale boss, he took Rochdale to the 2008 League Two play-off final, where they lost 3–2 against Stockport County, having defeated Darlington 5–4 on penalties in the semi-final. The 2008–09 season saw Hill take Rochdale to the 2009 League Two play-off semi final for the second year in a row, but they were beaten 2–1 by Gillingham, the eventual winners. The next season saw improvement again, gaining automatic promotion, after a 1–0 win against Northampton Town on 17 April 2010. However, a dip in form near the end of the season saw Rochdale miss out on the League Two title, finishing third behind Notts County and AFC Bournemouth. Rochdale finished ninth in League One the following season. The 68 points gained meant the club had achieved their highest league finish since the 1969–70 season.

=== Barnsley ===
Hill was given permission to talk to Championship club Barnsley about their vacant manager's job on 20 May 2011. Four days later, he chose to remain with Rochdale because "we are ambitious but we're also happy in our work here." Hill changed his mind at the start of June and was appointed manager of Barnsley, with assistant David Flitcroft joining him. With a relatively small budget at his disposal, Hill mainly signed players from lower divisions. Rochdale players Matt Done and Scott Wiseman were among his first signings for Barnsley. Barnsley avoided relegation by one place in his first season in charge, with results having deteriorated following the sale of striker Ricardo Vaz Tê and long-term injuries to influential midfielders Jacob Butterfield, Jim O'Brien and David Perkins in January. Hill was sacked by Barnsley on 29 December 2012, following a defeat by Blackburn.

=== Return to Rochdale ===
Following the sacking of John Coleman Hill returned to manage Rochdale for a second spell on 22 January 2013. On 26 April 2014, Rochdale won 2–0 against Cheltenham, promoting them back to League One.

=== Bolton Wanderers ===
On 31 August 2019 after Bolton's match against Gillingham, Hill was announced as the new manager of his home town team, Bolton Wanderers. Hill said being the Bolton manager was his "dream job", and, to bolster a squad previously reliant on youth players, signed nine players before the transfer deadline closed on 2 September 2019. Hill did not take charge of the EFL Trophy match against Bradford City on 3 September 2019, as Bolton played the youth team for one last time, so Hill had Jimmy Phillips manage the match instead. This meant his first match was against Rotherham United on 14 September. Bolton took an early lead from a Thibaud Verlinden goal, however Rotherham retaliated by scoring six goals and won the match 6–1. This was Bolton's fourth consecutive league loss by five goals. His first win came on 22 October, a 2–0 win against Bristol Rovers. On 12 June 2020 it was announced that Bolton Wanderers would not be renewing his contract after relegation to League Two.

=== Tranmere Rovers ===
On 21 November 2020 Hill was named manager of League Two side Tranmere Rovers. Hill was sacked on 11 May 2021, after the side reached the play-offs but before the play-off matches had started.

=== Scunthorpe United ===
On 5 November 2021, Hill was appointed manager of League Two's bottom side Scunthorpe United. His first match in charge was the following day where his side were defeated in the FA Cup first round by League One side Doncaster Rovers. A 3–0 defeat to Leyton Orient on 15 April 2022 confirmed Scunthorpe's relegation from the Football League after a 72 year spell.

On 30 August 2022, Hill was sacked with the club sitting in 23rd position in the National League.

== Managerial statistics ==
As of match played 28 August 2022

Managerial record by team and tenure
Team	From	To	Record					Ref.
Team	From	To	P	W	D	L	Win %	Ref.
Rochdale	16 December 2006	1 June 2011	231	101	59	71	43.72	
Barnsley	1 June 2011	29 December 2012	75	19	15	41	25.33	
Rochdale	22 January 2013	4 March 2019	339	134	82	123	39.53	
Bolton Wanderers	31 August 2019	30 June 2020	33	6	11	16	18.18	(Note: Soccerbase includes two matches managed by caretaker Jimmy Phillips, one against Gillingham on the same day as Hill's appointment, and one in the EFL Trophy that Hill watched from the stands, feeling it was too soon to field the many new signings. The Bolton News confirms his total as 33 matches.)
Tranmere Rovers	21 November 2020	11 May 2021	40	20	10	10	50.00	
Scunthorpe United	5 November 2021	30 August 2022	39	3	9	27	7.69	
Total			757	283	186	288	37.38	—

== Honours ==
=== As a player ===
Plymouth Argyle

- Football League Third Division play-offs: 1996

Cheltenham Town

- Football League Third Division play-offs: 2002

=== As a manager ===
Rochdale

- Football League Two promotion: 2009–10, 2013–14

Tranmere Rovers

- EFL Trophy runner-up: 2020–21

Individual

- Football / EFL League One Manager of the Month: January 2011, December 2016
- Football League Two Manager of the Month: January 2007, January 2008, September 2009, December 2009, September 2013
