= Ben Muirhead =

English footballer (born 1983)

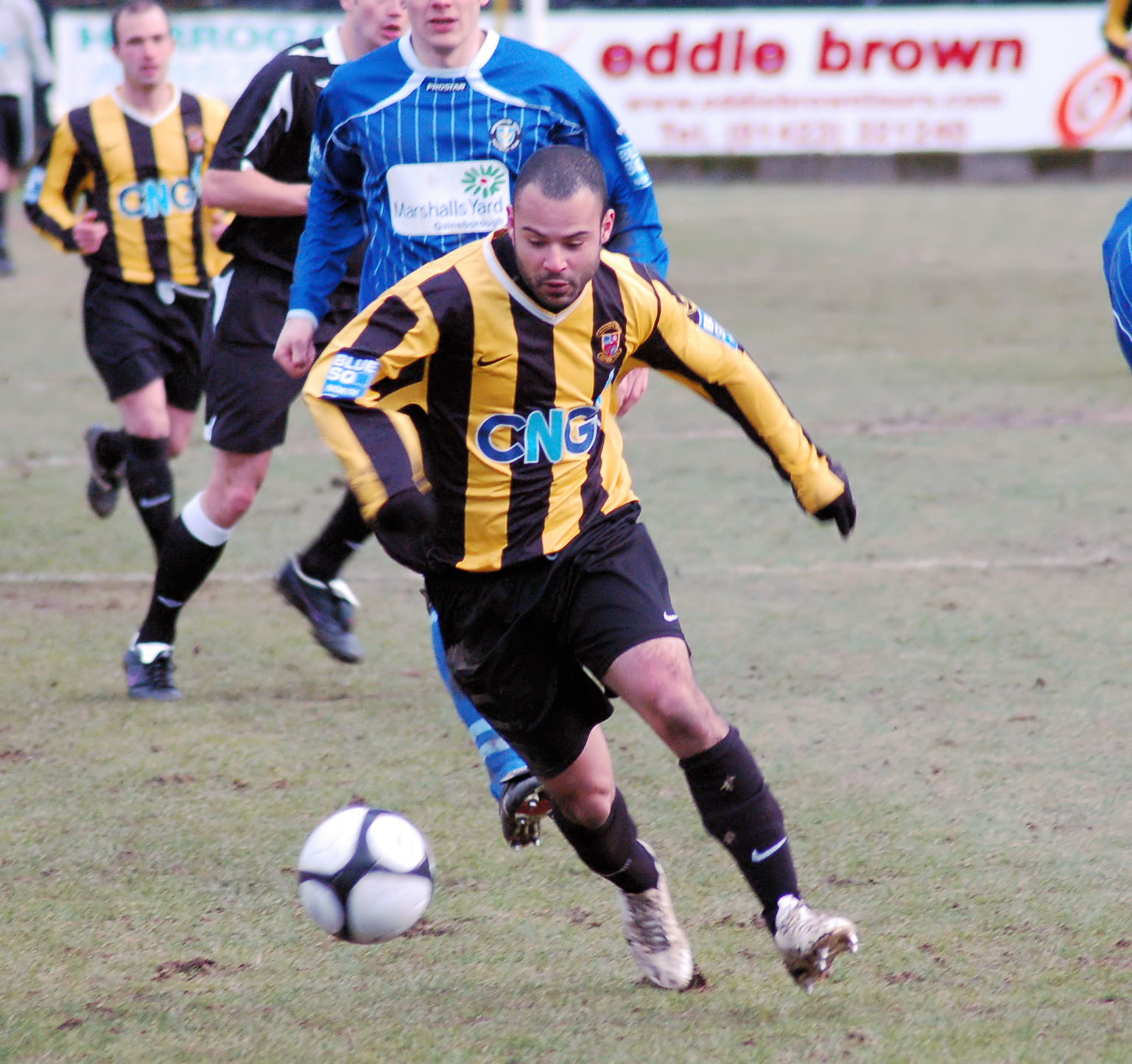
- Muirhead playinfg for Harrogate Town.

Personal information
- Full name: Benjamin Robinson Muirhead
- Date of birth: 5 January 1983 (age 43)
- Place of birth: Doncaster, England
- Height: 1.75 m (5 ft 8 7/8 in)
- Position: Winger

Youth career
- 1999–2002: Manchester United

Senior career*
Years	Team	Apps	(Gls)
2002–2003	Manchester United	0	(0)
2002	→ Doncaster Rovers (loan)	6	(0)
2003–2007	Bradford City	112	(4)
2007	→ Rochdale (loan)	12	(3)
2007–2008	Rochdale	31	(0)
2008–2009	Alfreton Town		
2009	Farsley Celtic		
2009	King's Lynn	5	(0)
2009–2010	Harrogate Town	8	(1)
2010	Buxton		
2010–2011	Armthorpe Welfare		
2011–2013	Buxton		
2013–2014	Retford United		
2014–2015	Armthorpe Welfare		
2015	Buxton		

Managerial career
- 2015: Armthorpe Welfare (assistant)
- * Club domestic league appearances and goals as of 18:27, 15 August 2015 (UTC)

Benjamin Robinson Muirhead (born 5 January 1983) is an English former professional footballer and coach.

As a player, he was a winger. He notably played in the Premier League for Manchester United, going on to make a loan move to Doncaster Rovers before signing with Bradford City. He played more than 100 games in four years at Bradford, before signing for Rochdale. Muirhead dropped into non-league football in 2008 where he has played for Alfreton Town, Farsley Celtic, King's Lynn, Harrogate Town and Buxton, Armthorpe Welfare and Retford United. In 2015 he returned to Armthorpe as assistant manager.

== Playing career ==
Born in Doncaster, South Yorkshire, Muirhead was a highly rated youngster and played for England schoolboys, including playing against an Argentina Under-15 squad starring Carlos Tevez at Wembley. After beginning his career at Manchester United, he moved to Bradford City. He then moved to Rochdale on loan and scored on his debut versus Notts County, which Rochdale went on to win 2–1. Muirhead caught the eye of many League Two pundits during his loan spell and it was a disappointment when Bantams caretaker boss David Wetherall recalled him.

He was released by Bradford City in May 2007. The following month, he signed a permanent deal with League Two outfit Rochdale. He scored the winning penalty as Rochdale reached the play-off final after defeating Darlington. In June 2008, he was transfer listed by Rochdale. Muirhead left the club on 31 July by mutual consent, stating a wish to play higher up the Football League.

Muirhead was given a trial with Darlington, but in August 2008, he instead signed for Conference North side Alfreton Town under the management of Nicky Law, who had brought Muirhead to Bradford. After a month with the club, he was rewarded for a string of good performances by being given a one-year contract. He was released after one season with Alfreton because he required an operation which would keep him out of action for eight months. He signed for Conference North side Farsley Celtic at the end of August 2009. He moved onto King's Lynn before signing for Harrogate Town in December 2009. Muirhead's time at Harrogate Town would prove to be a very short one as on 8 March 2010, he left the CNG stadium and signed for Buxton F.C.

== Coaching career ==
In June 2015 Muirhead was announced as an assistant manager at Armthorpe Welfare, alongside his role as a player there.
