= Adam Rundle =

English footballer (born 1984)

Personal information
- Full name: Adam Rundle
- Date of birth: 8 July 1984 (age 42)
- Place of birth: South Shields, England
- Position: Midfielder

Youth career
- Newcastle United

Senior career*
Years	Team	Apps	(Gls)
2001–2003	Darlington	17	(0)
2003–2004	Carlisle United	44	(1)
2004	Dublin City	8	(4)
2005–2006	Mansfield Town	53	(10)
2006–2010	Rochdale	132	(19)
2009	→ Rotherham United (loan)	4	(0)
2010	Chesterfield	16	(0)
2010–2011	Morecambe	17	(0)
2011	→ Gateshead (loan)	7	(2)
2011–2012	Darlington	38	(6)
2013	Cork City	12	(1)
2013–2014	Whitby Town	44	(10)
Total		392	(53)
- * Club domestic league appearances and goals

Adam Rundle (born 8 July 1984) is an English footballer who made nearly 300 appearances in the Football League.

== Career ==
=== Darlington ===
A left-sided midfielder who began his career in Newcastle United's youth team, Rundle was released by the club in 2001 without being offered a professional contract. He subsequently joined Newcastle's neighbours Darlington in December 2001.

=== Carlisle United ===
Rundle played 22 times for Darlington before joining Carlisle United for a £40,000 transfer fee on 1 January 2003. At Carlisle, where he was regarded as a talented young player, Rundle played regularly under manager Roddy Collins. He scored his first goal for the club in a league match against Kidderminster Harriers. He then scored a crucial goal in Carlisle's run in the 2002–03 Football League Trophy: in the Northern Area Final first leg, Rundle scored to give Carlisle a 1–0 advantage over Shrewsbury Town. The second leg finished goalless, meaning that Carlisle went through. Rundle played in the final but was unable to prevent them from losing to Bristol City. The following season, he scored his third and final goal for the club in another Football League Trophy tie, this time against Rochdale. However, when Carlisle were relegated from The Football League at the end of the 2003–04 campaign, he left the club.

=== Dublin City ===
Rundle signed for his old manager Roddy Collins in Republic of Ireland with Dublin City, where he became a teammate of former England international Carlton Palmer.

=== Mansfield Town ===
When Palmer was named manager of League Two side Mansfield Town in November 2004, he made Rundle one of his first signings in the 2005 January transfer window. Rundle signed a one-year contract extension at the end of the season.

In January 2006, Rundle fulfilled his boyhood dream of playing at St James' Park in Newcastle, when Mansfield played Newcastle United in the FA Cup. Mansfield held their own well against their more famous opponents, eventually losing 1–0. Rundle had an excellent game against his boyhood favourites.

Rundle played regularly for Mansfield, scoring nine goals for the Stags. However, when his contract expired at the end of the 2005–06 season, new manager Peter Shirtliff decided not to renew his services.

=== Rochdale ===
On 30 June 2006, Rochdale manager Steve Parkin made Rundle his first signing of the summer. He initially signed a one-year deal with Rochdale, and was given the number 11 shirt. Under Parkin, Rundle played in few games, but he flourished under the tutelage of new manager Keith Hill, who was appointed in late 2006.

On 26 May 2008, Rundle played for Rochdale in their League Two play-off final defeat at Wembley, in which he scored an exceptional volleyed goal with his right foot. He soon signed an extension to his contract until the end of 2009–10 season, and has now played in over 250 games in his career, scoring 31 goals.

On 23 November 2009, Rundle joined Rochdale's League Two rivals Rotherham United on a one-month emergency loan, and made his league debut in a 2–0 win over Lincoln City one day later. He played in three further games before his loan spell ended. On 1 February 2010 Rundle had his contracted terminated by mutual consent.

=== Chesterfield ===
A few hours later he signed with Chesterfield

=== Morecambe ===
On 26 May 2010, Rundle signed for Morecambe on a two-year deal.

On 28 February 2011, Rundle joined Gateshead until the end of the 2010–11 season. He made his debut for Gateshead the following day against York City at Bootham Crescent. Rundle scored his first goal for Gateshead on 12 March 2011 against Darlington at The Darlington Arena in the FA Trophy.

On 4 July 2011, Rundle left Morecambe by mutual consent after not being guaranteed first team football.

=== Darlington Return ===
On 6 July 2011, Rundle joined Conference National side Darlington on a one-year contract. Darlington suffered financial difficulties during Rundle's time at the club, and his contract was terminated on 16 January 2012, along with the rest of the playing squad and caretaker manager Craig Liddle. He returned to the club, along with most of the rest of the players on a non-contract basis.

=== Cork City ===
On 28 January 2013, it was announced that Rundle was joining Airtricity League side Cork City for the 2013 season. His shining moment came when Premier League side West Ham came to Cork during their pre-season, in which Rundle scored a spectacular goal against them, but ended in a 6–2 for the home side. He had his contract mutually cancelled on 30 July 2013.

== Career statistics ==
=== Club ===
As of 16 January 2012

Appearances and goals by club, season and competition
Club	Season	League^{[A]}		FA Cup		League Cup		Other^{[B]}		Total	
Club	Season	Apps	Goals	Apps	Goals	Apps	Goals	Apps	Goals	Apps	Goals
Darlington	2001–02	12	0	0	0	0	0	0	0	12	0
Darlington	2002–03	5	0	0	0	0	0	0	0	5	0
Darlington	Total	17	0	0	0	0	0	0	0	17	0
Carlisle United	2002–03	21	1	0	0	0	0	4	1	25	2
Carlisle United	2003–04	23	0	0	0	1	0	1	1	25	1
Carlisle United	Total	44	1	0	0	1	0	5	2	50	3
Dublin City	2004	8	3	0	0	0	0	0	0	8	3
Mansfield Town	2004–05	18	4	0	0	0	0	0	0	18	4
Mansfield Town	2005–06	35	5	3	0	1	0	0	0	39	5
Mansfield Town	Total	53	9	3	0	1	0	0	0	57	9
Rochdale	2006–07	29	4	2	0	1	1	0	0	32	5
Rochdale	2007–08	45	6	1	0	2	0	1	0	49	6
Rochdale	2008–09	46	7	2	0	1	0	2	0	51	7
Rochdale	2009–10	12	1	2	0	1	0	1	0	16	1
Rochdale	Total	132	18	7	0	5	1	4	0	148	19
Rotherham United (Loan)	2009–10	4	0	0	0	0	0	0	0	4	0
Chesterfield	2009–10	16	0	0	0	0	0	0	0	16	0
Morecambe	2001–11	17	0	0	0	1	0	0	0	18	0
Gateshead (Loan)	2010–11	7	0	0	0	0	0	2	1	9	1
Darlington	2011–12	21	2	0	0	0	0	0	0	21	2
Career totals		311	30	10	0	8	1	11	3	348	37

A. The "League" column constitutes appearances and goals (including those as a substitute) in The Football League, League of Ireland and Football Conference.
B. The "Other" column constitutes appearances and goals (including those as a substitute) in the FA Trophy, Football League Trophy and play-offs.

== Honours ==
Carlisle United

- Football League Trophy runner-up: 2002–03
