= David Perkins (footballer) =

English footballer (born 1982)

- Perkins in 2026

Personal information
- Full name: David Philip Perkins
- Date of birth: 21 June 1982 (age 44)
- Place of birth: Heysham, England
- Height: 5 ft 6 in (1.67 m)
- Position: Midfielder

Team information
- Current team: Wigan Athletic (first-team coach)

Senior career*
Years	Team	Apps	(Gls)
2000–2007	Morecambe	178	(1)
2007–2008	Rochdale	60	(5)
2008–2011	Colchester United	79	(7)
2009–2010	→ Chesterfield (loan)	13	(1)
2010	→ Stockport County (loan)	22	(0)
2011–2014	Barnsley	91	(2)
2014–2015	Blackpool	65	(0)
2015–2018	Wigan Athletic	85	(1)
2018–2019	Rochdale	18	(0)
2019–2020	Tranmere Rovers	44	(2)
2020–2022	AFC Fylde	36	(2)
2022	Bamber Bridge	19	(0)
2024–2025	Exeter City	0	(0)
Total		710	(21)

International career
2003–2006	England C	9	(0)
- * Club domestic league appearances and goals as of 20:45, 01 January 2024 (UTC)

David Philip Perkins (born 21 June 1982) is an English former professional footballer who played as a midfielder. He is currently first-team coach at Wigan Athletic.

== Career ==
=== Morecambe ===
Perkins started his career with Morecambe, for whom he played 170 league games.

=== Rochdale ===
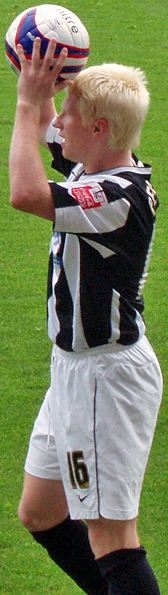
Perkins playing for Rochdale in 2007

In 2007, he moved to League Two side Rochdale. On 17 May 2008 he scored a deflected goal from 30 yards which put Rochdale level on aggregate with Darlington in a semi-final play-off, during which he was later shown a red card. Rochdale went through on penalties. Rochdale appealed to his red card which was rejected by the FA, meaning he missed the League Two play-off final against Stockport County at Wembley Stadium and also the first four games of the 2008–09 season.

=== Colchester United ===
Perkins signed for Colchester United on 8 July 2008 for an undisclosed six-figure fee, citing the potential of another promotion push as the leading reason for his move to the U's.

=== Chesterfield ===
On 2 October 2009 Perkins signed on loan for Chesterfield.

=== Stockport County ===
On 18 January 2010 he signed on loan for Stockport on a deal until the end of the season.

=== Return to Colchester ===
After becoming an outcast in the U's squad under Aidy Boothroyd his career at the club looked bleak until John Ward was appointed as new boss in May 2010. After regaining his first team place and making over 40 appearances Perkins was being scouted by a number of Championship clubs. At the end of the season with Colchester he won four awards: Player of the Year; Player's Player of the Year; CUSA (Colchester United Supporters' Association) Home Player of the Year and CUSA Away Player of the Year. Teammate Anthony Wordsworth said of Perkins, "He was simply amazing this season".

=== Barnsley ===
On 7 June 2011, he rejected the opportunity to extend his deal at Colchester United and subsequently signed for Championship side Barnsley; signing a 2-year contract with the Tykes. He had previously worked with ex Barnsley manager Keith Hill at Rochdale. He made his debut on 6 August 2011, in a 0–0 draw against Nottingham Forest. On 9 April 2012 he scored his first goal for Barnsley, coming in a 1–1 draw away to Blackpool. The goal was described as a "face volley" by football correspondent Conor Breen.

His bright blonde hair, similar to that of London Mayor Boris Johnson's, led to Charlton Athletic supporters nicknaming him 'Barnsley Boris' after Barnsley's visit to The Valley in October 2012.

Due to his consistently solid performances throughout the season in midfield, he received the Supporters' Player of the Year Award for the 2012–13 Season.

The energetic midfielder penned an extension to his contract in August, 2012, keeping him at the club until at least the summer of 2014.

=== Blackpool ===
On 17 January 2014, Perkins signed an 18-month deal with Blackpool on a free transfer. He was released in May 2015.

=== Wigan Athletic ===
On 20 May 2015, Perkins signed a one-year deal with newly relegated side Wigan Athletic after his release from Blackpool.

David Perkins scored his only goal and most memorable in his career whilst playing for Wigan against his former team Blackpool, scoring the 3rd goal in a 3–1 victory.

Wigan entered into contract talks with him at the end of the 2017–18 season.

=== Return to Rochdale ===
On 24 May 2018, it was announced that Perkins had signed a new two-year deal with Rochdale, which would be effective from July 1, moving from Wigan Athletic where he spent 3 years. It is Perkins' second spell at the club, after a season long stay in the 2007–08 season.

Speaking about the move, Perkins said "I've had a good three years at Wigan. We got promoted during my first year, relegated during my second and then promoted this season. I've had some great times there and I've enjoyed every minute of it. The fans have been unbelievable with me, all the staff and the Chairman, so I can't thank them enough."

=== Tranmere Rovers ===
On 5 January 2019, Perkins joined Tranmere Rovers on an 18-month contract from Rochdale.

=== AFC Fylde ===
On 16 August 2020, Perkins signed for AFC Fylde. He was released on 21 May 2022.

=== Bamber Bridge ===
On 2 August 2022, Perkins signed for Bamber Bridge.

=== Exeter City ===
On 1 January 2024, Perkins was an unused substitute for Exeter's League One fixture away at Reading due to a shortage of available first-team players. He was given the number 18 shirt. Perkins would feature in an Exeter City match during the 2024–25 season, coming on as a 67th minute substitute in a EFL Trophy home fixture against Tottenham Hotspur; consequently, he became their oldest player at the age of 42. Exeter City won the match 2–0.

== Coaching career ==
On 10 November 2022, Perkins was appointed first team coach and Under 23s manager at Exeter City.

In February 2026, Perkins returned to former club Wigan Athletic as first-team coach, following head coach Gary Caldwell from Exeter City.

== Career statistics ==
As of match played 24 September 2024

Appearances and goals by club, season and competition
Club	Season	League			FA Cup		League Cup		Other		Total	
Club	Season	Division	Apps	Goals	Apps	Goals	Apps	Goals	Apps	Goals	Apps	Goals
Morecambe	2000–01	Conference National	4	0	1	0	0	0	1 (Note: Appearances in Football League Trophy)	0	6	0
Morecambe	2001–02	Conference National	21	0	1	0	0	0	2 (Note: Appearances in FA Trophy)	0	24	0
Morecambe	2002–03	Conference National	23	0	1	0	0	0	1	0	25	0
Morecambe	2003–04	Conference National	39	0	1	0	0	0	1	0	41	0
Morecambe	2004–05	Conference National	35	0	1	0	0	0	3 (Note: One appearance in Football League Trophy and two in FA Trophy)	0	39	0
Morecambe	2005–06	Conference National	36	1	1	0	0	0	4 (Note: Two appearances in Football League Trophy and two in Conference play-offs)	0	41	1
Morecambe	2006–07	Conference National	20	0	2	0	0	0	1	0	23	0
Morecambe	Total		178	1	8	0	0	0	13	0	199	1
Rochdale	2006–07	League Two	18	0	0	0	0	0	0	0	18	0
Rochdale	2007–08	League Two	42	5	1	0	1	1	1	0	45	6
Rochdale	Total		60	5	1	0	1	1	1	0	63	6
Colchester United	2008–09	League One	38	5	1	0	1	0	3	1	43	6
Colchester United	2009–10	League One	5	1	0	0	1	0	1	0	6	1
Colchester United	2010–11	League One	36	1	3	0	2	0	0	0	41	1
Colchester United	Total		79	7	4	0	4	0	4	1	91	8
Chesterfield (loan)	2009–10	League Two	13	1	1	0	0	0	0	0	14	1
Stockport County (loan)	2009–10	League One	22	0	0	0	0	0	0	0	22	0
Barnsley	2011–12	Championship	33	1	1	0	1	0	—		35	1
Barnsley	2012–13	Championship	35	1	4	0	1	0	—		40	1
Barnsley	2013–14	Championship	23	0	1	0	1	0	—		25	0
Barnsley	Total		91	2	6	0	3	0	0	0	100	2
Blackpool	2013–14	Championship	20	0	0	0	0	0	—		20	0
Blackpool	2014–15	Championship	45	0	1	0	1	0	—		47	0
Blackpool	Total		65	0	1	0	1	0	0	0	67	0
Wigan Athletic	2015–16	League One	45	0	1	0	1	0	1	0	48	0
Wigan Athletic	2016–17	Championship	27	0	1	0	1	0	—		29	0
Wigan Athletic	2017–18	League One	13	1	5	0	1	0	2 (Note: Appearance in EFL Trophy)	0	21	1
Wigan Athletic	Total		81	1	7	0	4	0	4	0	98	1
Rochdale	2018–19	League One	17	0	1	0	1	0	2	0	21	0
Tranmere Rovers	2018–19	League Two	17	2	0	0	0	0	3 (Note: Two appearances in League Two Play Offs)	0	20	2
Tranmere Rovers	2019–20	League One	27	0	5	0	1	0	0	0	33	0
Tranmere Rovers	Total		44	2	5	0	1	0	3	0	53	2
Exeter City	2024–25	League One	0	0	0	0	0	0	1	0	1	0
Career total			662	19	34	0	15	1	28	1	730	21

== Honours ==
Wigan Athletic

- Football/EFL League One: 2015–16, 2017–18

Tranmere Rovers

- EFL League Two play-offs: 2019

Individual

- Barnsley Player of the Year: 2012–13
