= 2008–09 Rochdale A.F.C. season =

English football club season

Rochdale A.F.C.
2008–09 season
- Chairman: Chris Dunphy
- Manager: Keith Hill
- League Two: 6th
- FA Cup: Second round
- League Cup: First round
- Top goalscorer: League: Adam Le Fondre (17); All: Adam Le Fondre (20)
- Highest home attendance: 5,786 vs Oldham Athletic, League Cup (12 August 2008)
- Lowest home attendance: 1,608 vs Carlisle United, Football League Trophy (7 October 2008)
Home colours	Away colours	Third colours

The 2008–09 season was Rochdale A.F.C.'s 102nd in existence and their 35th consecutive in the fourth tier of the English football league (League Two). Rochdale finished the season in 6th place in League Two, but missed out on promotion to League One after losing in the play-off semi-final against Gillingham. Adam Le Fondre finished as the club's top goal scorer with twenty goals in all competitions.

== League table ==
Pos	Team	Pld	W	D	L	GF	GA	GD	Pts	Promotion, qualification or relegation
4	Bury	46	21	15	10	63	43	+20	78	Qualification for League Two play-offs
5	Gillingham (O, P)	46	21	12	13	58	55	+3	75	Qualification for League Two play-offs
6	Rochdale	46	19	13	14	70	59	+11	70	Qualification for League Two play-offs
7	Shrewsbury Town	46	17	18	11	61	44	+17	69	Qualification for League Two play-offs
8	Dagenham & Redbridge	46	19	11	16	77	53	+24	68	

Source: The Football League
Rules for classification: 1) points; 2) goal difference; 3) number of goals scored.
(O) Play-off winners; (P) Promoted

== Players ==
=== Squad information ===
Note: Flags indicate national team as defined under FIFA eligibility rules; some limited exceptions apply. Players may hold more than one non-FIFA nationality.

No.	Pos.	Nation	Player
1	GK	ENG	Sam Russell
2	DF	ENG	Simon Ramsden
3	DF	ENG	Tom Kennedy
4	DF	ENG	Nathan Stanton
5	MF	ENG	Clark Keltie
6	MF	NIR	Ciarán Toner
7	FW	NIR	Lee McEvilly
8	MF	ENG	Gary Jones
9	FW	ENG	Chris Dagnall
10	FW	ENG	Adam Le Fondre
11	MF	ENG	Adam Rundle
12	DF	ENG	Nathan D'Laryea
14	DF	ENG	Scott Wiseman
15	MF	ENG	Joe Thompson
17	FW	ENG	Jon Shaw
18	FW	ENG	Kallum Higginbotham
19	FW	ENG	Lee Thorpe
20	DF	ENG	Raphale Evans

=== Statistics ===
No.	Pos	Nat	Player	Total		League Two		FA Cup		League Cup		League Trophy		Play-offs	
No.	Pos	Nat	Player	Apps	Goals	Apps	Goals	Apps	Goals	Apps	Goals	Apps	Goals	Apps	Goals
1	GK	(England) ENG	Sam Russell	29	0	23 + 0	0	3 + 0	0	1 + 0	0	2 + 0	0	0 + 0	0
2	DF	(England) ENG	Simon Ramsden	32	0	25 + 3	0	1 + 0	0	1 + 0	0	0 + 0	0	2 + 0	0
3	DF	(England) ENG	Tom Kennedy	53	4	45 + 0	4	3 + 0	0	1 + 0	0	2 + 0	0	2 + 0	0
4	DF	(England) ENG	Nathan Stanton	46	0	39 + 0	0	2 + 0	0	1 + 0	0	2 + 0	0	2 + 0	0
5	MF	(England) ENG	Clark Keltie	36	1	26 + 5	1	2 + 0	0	1 + 0	0	1 + 1	0	0 + 0	0
6	MF	(Northern Ireland) NIR	Ciarán Toner	44	1	32 + 5	1	2 + 0	0	0 + 1	0	2 + 0	0	2 + 0	0
7	FW	(Northern Ireland) NIR	Lee McEvilly	16	5	4 + 12	5	0 + 0	0	0 + 0	0	0 + 0	0	0 + 0	0
8	MF	(England) ENG	Gary Jones	34	0	28 + 0	0	2 + 0	0	1 + 0	0	1 + 0	0	2 + 0	0
9	FW	(England) ENG	Chris Dagnall	45	10	25 + 14	7	1 + 0	1	1 + 0	0	1 + 1	1	1 + 1	1
10	FW	(England) ENG	Adam Le Fondre	51	21	28 + 16	18	2 + 0	3	0 + 1	0	1 + 1	0	1 + 1	0
11	MF	(England) ENG	Adam Rundle	51	7	32 + 12	7	1 + 1	0	1 + 0	0	1 + 1	0	2 + 0	0
12	DF	(England) ENG	Nathan D'Laryea	0	0	0 + 0	0	0 + 0	0	0 + 0	0	0 + 0	0	0 + 0	0
14	DF	(Gibraltar) GIB	Scott Wiseman	36	0	30 + 2	0	2 + 0	0	0 + 0	0	1 + 1	0	0 + 0	0
15	MF	(England) ENG	Joe Thompson	35	5	21 + 9	5	0 + 1	0	0 + 0	0	2 + 0	0	1 + 1	0
16	MF	(Wales) WAL	Nicky Adams	14	1	12 + 2	1	0 + 0	0	0 + 0	0	0 + 0	0	0 + 0	0
16	FW	(Scotland) SCO	Jordan Rhodes	5	2	5 + 0	2	0 + 0	0	0 + 0	0	0 + 0	0	0 + 0	0
17	MF	(England) ENG	Jon Shaw	11	1	5 + 1	1	1 + 2	0	1 + 0	0	0 + 0	0	0 + 1	0
18	FW	(England) ENG	Kallum Higginbotham	9	1	3 + 4	1	1 + 0	0	1 + 0	0	0 + 0	0	0 + 0	0
19	FW	(England) ENG	Lee Thorpe	36	6	18 + 10	5	2 + 1	0	0 + 1	0	1 + 1	1	2 + 0	0
20	DF	(England) ENG	Raphale Evans	0	0	0 + 0	0	0 + 0	0	0 + 0	0	0 + 0	0	0 + 0	0
21	GK	(England) ENG	James Spencer	0	0	0 + 0	0	0 + 0	0	0 + 0	0	0 + 0	0	0 + 0	0
22	MF	(England) ENG	David Flitcroft	1	0	0 + 1	0	0 + 0	0	0 + 0	0	0 + 0	0	0 + 0	0
23	DF	(Northern Ireland) NIR	Rory McArdle	49	2	41 + 0	2	3 + 0	0	1 + 0	0	2 + 0	0	2 + 0	0
24	DF	(England) ENG	Chris Brown	0	0	0 + 0	0	0 + 0	0	0 + 0	0	0 + 0	0	0 + 0	0
24	FW	(England) ENG	Gary Madine	3	0	1 + 2	0	0 + 0	0	0 + 0	0	0 + 0	0	0 + 0	0
25	MF	(England) ENG	Callum Byrne	0	0	0 + 0	0	0 + 0	0	0 + 0	0	0 + 0	0	0 + 0	0
26	DF	(England) ENG	Craig Dawson	0	0	0 + 0	0	0 + 0	0	0 + 0	0	0 + 0	0	0 + 0	0
26	MF	(England) ENG	Kyle Lambert	1	0	0 + 1	0	0 + 0	0	0 + 0	0	0 + 0	0	0 + 0	0
27	MF	(Wales) WAL	Mark Jones	13	0	7 + 2	0	1 + 2	0	0 + 0	0	1 + 0	0	0 + 0	0
29	DF	(England) ENG	Tom Newey	2	0	1 + 1	0	0 + 0	0	0 + 0	0	0 + 0	0	0 + 0	0
30	MF	(England) ENG	Will Buckley	43	10	28 + 9	10	3 + 0	0	0 + 0	0	1 + 0	0	1 + 1	0
31	DF	(England) ENG	Marcus Holness	10	0	4 + 3	0	1 + 1	0	0 + 0	0	1 + 0	0	0 + 0	0
34	GK	(England) ENG	Frank Fielding	25	0	23 + 0	0	0 + 0	0	0 + 0	0	0 + 0	0	2 + 0	0
	DF	(England) ENG	George Bowman	0	0	0 + 0	0	0 + 0	0	0 + 0	0	0 + 0	0	0 + 0	0
	MF	(England) ENG	Theo Coleman	0	0	0 + 0	0	0 + 0	0	0 + 0	0	0 + 0	0	0 + 0	0

== Transfers ==
=== In ===
Player	From	Fee	Date	Notes
(Northern Ireland) Ciarán Toner	Grimsby Town	Free	30 June 2008	
(England) Clark Keltie	Darlington	Free	2 July 2008	
(England) Scott Wiseman	Darlington	Free	2 July 2008	
(England) Jon Shaw	Halifax Town	Undisclosed	5 July 2008	
(England) Lee McEvilly	Cambridge United	Undisclosed	5 January 2009	
(England) Craig Dawson	Radcliffe Borough	Undisclosed	23 February 2009	

=== Loans in ===
Pos.	Player	Nat.	Loaned from	Date from	Date until	Ref.
GK	Frank Fielding	ENG	Blackburn Rovers	6 January 2009	29 September 2009	

== Competitions ==
=== Friendlies ===
19 July 2008	Rossendale United	0–6	Rochdale	Newchurch
		Report; Report	Le Fondre; Shaw; Buckley	Stadium: Dark Lane

22 July 2008	Rochdale	0–0	Stockport County	Rochdale
		Report		Stadium: Spotland Stadium

25 July 2008	Rochdale	0–0	Bolton Wanderers	Rochdale
		Report		Stadium: Spotland Stadium

26 July 2008	Northwich Victoria	2–0	Rochdale	Northwich
14:00 BST	Goal	Report		Stadium: Victoria Stadium

2 August 2008	Southport	1–2	Rochdale	Southport
		Report		Stadium: Haig Avenue

=== League Two ===
9 August 2008 1	Grimsby Town	0–0	Rochdale	Cleethorpes
15:00 BST	Butler (yellow card) 66'; Hope (yellow card) 80'	Report	Stanton (yellow card) 67'; Keltie (yellow card) 76'	Stadium: Blundell Park; Attendance: 4,213; Referee: Craig Pawson

16 August 2008 2	Rochdale	3–1	Barnet	Rochdale
15:00 BST	Rundle (yellow card) 18' (goal) 39'; Dagnall 45'; Shaw 77'	Report	Birchall 3'	Stadium: Spotland Stadium; Attendance: 2,442; Referee: Oliver Langford

23 August 2008 3	Bradford City	2–0	Rochdale	Bradford
15:00 BST	Boulding 20'; Thorne 35'	Report	Ramsden (yellow card) 15'; Keltie (yellow card) 50'; Wiseman (yellow card) 86'	Stadium: Valley Parade; Attendance: 13,154; Referee: Andy Penn

30 August 2008 4	Rochdale	1–1	Bury	Rochdale
15:00 BST	Le Fondre 68'; Keltie (yellow card) 90'	Report	Russell 8' (o.g.)	Stadium: Spotland Stadium; Attendance: 5,492; Referee: Anthony Bates

6 September 2008 5	Rochdale	0–1	Wycombe Wanderers	Rochdale
15:00 BST	Stanton (yellow card) 14'	Report	Zebroski 31'	Stadium: Spotland Stadium; Attendance: 2,880; Referee: Jonathan Moss

12 September 2008 6	Rotherham United	2–2	Rochdale	Sheffield
15:00 BST	Reid (yellow card) 75' (goal) 90'; McArdle 77' (o.g.)	Report	Rhodes 43'; Keltie (yellow card) 48'; Buckley 51'; Thorpe (red card) 69'	Stadium: Don Valley Stadium; Attendance: 3,569; Referee: Darren Drysdale

20 September 2008 7	Rochdale	2–1	Chesterfield	Rochdale
15:00 BST	Buckley 67'; McArdle (yellow card) 79'; Kennedy 90'	Report	Downes (yellow card) 41'; Ward 85' (yellow card) 90' (yellow-red card) 90'	Stadium: Spotland Stadium; Attendance: 2,884; Referee: Andy Haines

28 September 2008 8	Accrington Stanley	1–3	Rochdale	Accrington
15:00 BST	Miles 2'; Murdock (yellow card) 13'; Cavanagh (yellow card) 38'	Report	Le Fondre (yellow card) 19' (goal) 37'; Buckley 57'; Thompson 90'	Stadium: Crown Ground; Attendance: 2,417; Referee: Lee Probert

4 October 2008 9	Rochdale	0–2	Dagenham & Redbridge	Rochdale
15:00 BST	Keltie (yellow card) 66'	Report	Benson 31'; Gain (yellow card) 55'; Ritchie 68'	Stadium: Spotland Stadium; Attendance: 2,566; Referee: David Webb

10 October 2008 10	Lincoln City	1–1	Rochdale	Lincoln
19:45 BST	John-Lewis (yellow card) 36'; Hone 86'	Report	McArdle (yellow card) 2'; Rundle 26'; Thorpe (yellow card) 35'	Stadium: Sincil Bank; Attendance: 4,510; Referee: Christopher Sarginson

18 October 2008 11	Morecambe	1–1	Rochdale	Morecambe
15:00 BST	Taylor 48'; Howe (yellow card) 54'	Report	Dagnall 19'	Stadium: Christie Park; Attendance: 2,572; Referee: Carl Boyeson

21 October 2008 12	Rochdale	6–1	Chester City	Rochdale
19:45 BST	Dagnall 14', 32', 58'; Thorpe 62'; Le Fondre 68', 69'	Report	Rule (red card) 32'; McArdle 53' (o.g.)	Stadium: Spotland Stadium; Attendance: 2,162; Referee: Mark Haywood

25 October 2008 13	Rochdale	3–1	Aldershot Town	Rochdale
15:00 BST	Rundle 27'; Thompson 81'; Buckley 90+4'	Report	Charles (yellow card) 5'; Morgan 66'	Stadium: Spotland Stadium; Attendance: 2,750; Referee: C. Oliver

28 October 2008 14	Notts County	1–2	Rochdale	Nottingham
19:45 BST	Forrester 47' (pen.); Smith (yellow card) 90'	Report	Thorpe 63', 73'	Stadium: Meadow Lane; Attendance: 3,610; Referee: Phil Gibbs

1 November 2008 15	Brentford	1–2	Rochdale	Brentford
15:00 GMT	Poole (yellow card) 44'; Bowditch 50'	Report	McArdle 31'; Buckley 40'	Stadium: Griffin Park; Attendance: 4,291; Referee: G Hegley

15 November 2008 16	Rochdale	1–1	Macclesfield Town	Rochdale
15:00 GMT	Stanton (yellow card) 7'; Rundle 66'	Report	Brown 81'	Stadium: Spotland Stadium; Attendance: 3,013; Referee: Graham Salisbury

22 November 2008 17	Rochdale	2–0	Luton Town	Rochdale
15:00 GMT	Thorpe 2'; Le Fondre 59' (pen.); Wiseman (yellow card) 81'; Stanton (yellow card) 82'	Report	O'Connor (yellow card) 38'; Martin (yellow card) 65'; Logan (yellow card) 85'	Stadium: Spotland Stadium; Attendance: 2,901; Referee: Steve Bratt

25 November 2008 18	Gillingham	1–1	Rochdale	Gillingham
19:45 GMT	Jackson 17'	Report	Le Fondre 61'; Thompson (yellow card) 87'; Keltie (yellow card) 90'	Stadium: Priestfield Stadium; Attendance: 4,029; Referee: S.D. Cook

13 December 2008 19	Rochdale	1–1	Bournemouth	Rochdale
15:00 GMT	Ramsden (yellow card) 35'; Stanton (yellow card) 45'; Le Fondre 67'	Report	Hollands (yellow card) 54'; Bradbury 45' (pen.)	Stadium: Spotland Stadium; Attendance: 2,285; Referee: G Laws

20 December 2008 20	Exeter City	4–1	Rochdale	Exeter
15:00 GMT	Moxey (yellow card) 28'; Basham 16', 31' (pen.); McAllister 84', 88'	Report	McArdle (yellow card) 28'; Wiseman (red card) 31'; Keltie 90' (pen.)	Stadium: St James Park; Attendance: 4,326; Referee: David Phillips

26 December 2008 21	Rochdale	2–1	Shrewsbury Town	Rochdale
15:00 GMT	Keltie (yellow card) 21'; Ramsden (yellow card) 30'; McEvilly 67', 83'	Report	Holt 59'	Stadium: Spotland Stadium; Attendance: 4,159; Referee: Dave Foster

28 December 2008 22	Port Vale	2–1	Rochdale	Stoke-on-Trent
15:00 GMT	Glover 74' (red card) 80'; Thompson 90'	Report	Le Fondre 82' (pen.)	Stadium: Vale Park; Attendance: 5,720; Referee: Dean Whitestone

3 January 2009 23	Rochdale	3–1	Accrington Stanley	Rochdale
15:00 GMT	Le Fondre 22' (pen.); McArdle (yellow card) 24'; McEvilly (yellow card) 39'; Buckley 56'; Higginbotham 87'	Report	Cavanagh 24'; Procter (yellow card) 44'; Charnock (yellow card) 59'	Stadium: Spotland Stadium; Attendance: 3,126; Referee: C Webster

17 January 2009 24	Rochdale	2–2	Lincoln City	Rochdale
15:00 GMT	Le Fondre 26'; McEvilly 84'	Report	Kennedy 48' (o.g.); N'Guessan 62'	Stadium: Spotland Stadium; Attendance: 2,897; Referee: Michael Oliver

24 January 2009 25	Dagenham & Redbridge	3–2	Rochdale	Dagenham
15:00 GMT	Arber 8'; Benson (yellow card) 45'; Ritchie 74'; Southam 79' (yellow card) 80'; Saunders (red card) 88'	Report	Kennedy 16'; Adams 21'	Stadium: Victoria Road; Attendance: 1,808; Referee: Simon Hooper

27 January 2009 26	Rochdale	3–0	Notts County	Rochdale
19:45 GMT	Buckley 45'; Dagnall 72'; Le Fondre 90'	Report	Wedderburn (yellow card) 37'; Nowland (yellow card) 63'	Stadium: Spotland Stadium; Attendance: 2,289; Referee: Andy Woolmer

31 January 2009 27	Aldershot Town	2–4	Rochdale	Aldershot
15:00 GMT	Newman (yellow card) 10'; Morgan 75'; Charles (yellow card) 76'; Davies 81' (pen.)	Report	Thompson 17', 23', 34'; Toner 45'; Stanton (red card) 80'	Stadium: Recreation Ground; Attendance: 3,018; Referee: Clive Penton

3 February 2009 28	Chester City	0–2	Rochdale	Chester
19:45 GMT		Report	Thompson 55'; McEvilly 65'	Stadium: Deva Stadium; Attendance: 1,357; Referee: Anthony Taylor

14 February 2009 29	Macclesfield Town	0–1	Rochdale	Macclesfield
15:00 GMT	Thomas (yellow card) 37'; Brain (yellow card) 45'; Sinclair (yellow card) 79'	Report	Dagnall (yellow card) 31'; Kennedy 45' (pen.); Stanton (yellow card) 88'	Stadium: Moss Rose; Attendance: 2,396; Referee: Christopher Sarginson

17 February 2009 30	Rochdale	1–1	Morecambe	Rochdale
19:45 GMT	Buckley 50'	Report	Twiss 90+1'; Bentley (yellow card) 90+2'	Stadium: Spotland Stadium; Attendance: 3,347; Referee: Neil Swarbrick

21 February 2009 31	Rochdale	1–2	Brentford	Rochdale
15:00 GMT	Kennedy 37' (pen.); McArdle (yellow card) 83'	Report	Rhodes 9'; MacDonald 15'	Stadium: Spotland Stadium; Attendance: 3,412; Referee: A.R. Hall

24 February 2009 32	Darlington	1–2	Rochdale	Darlington
19:45 GMT	Hatch (yellow card) 40'; Abbott 60'; Ravenhill (red card) 63'; Carlton (yellow card) 90'	Report	Le Fondre 28'; Thorpe (yellow card) 40'; Stanton (yellow card) 45'; Rundle 62'	Stadium: The Darlington Arena; Attendance: 2,858; Referee: Kevin Friend

28 February 2009 33	Rochdale	2–0	Grimsby Town	Rochdale
15:00 GMT	Rundle 5'; Le Fondre 12'; Stanton (yellow card) 36'	Report	Clarke (yellow card) 48'; Boshell (yellow card) 89'; Henderson (yellow card) 90'	Stadium: Spotland Stadium; Attendance: 3,076; Referee: Trevor Kettle

3 March 2009 34	Barnet	2–1	Rochdale	London
19:45 GMT	O'Flynn 42'; Bolasie 90'	Report	McEvilly 45'; Kennedy (yellow card) 49'; Dagnall (red card) 86'	Stadium: Underhill Stadium; Attendance: 1,332

7 March 2009 35	Bury	2–1	Rochdale	Bury
12:00 GMT	Bennett 19'; Jones 84'	Report	Keltie (yellow card) 86'; Buckley 90'	Stadium: Gigg Lane; Attendance: 7,589; Referee: A.G. Wiley

10 March 2009 36	Rochdale	3–0	Bradford City	Rochdale
19:45 GMT	McArdle (yellow card) 43' (goal) 49'; Le Fondre 56' (pen.), 72' (pen.); Thorpe (yellow card) 78'	Report	Colbeck (yellow card) 49'; Arnison (yellow card) 67'; Furman (yellow card) 72'; Rehman (yellow card) 81'; Law (yellow card) 90'	Stadium: Spotland Stadium; Attendance: 5,500; Referee: Scott Mathieson

14 March 2009 37	Rochdale	1–2	Rotherham United	Rochdale
15:00 GMT	Keltie (yellow card) 68'; Le Fondre 75'	Report	Reid 50' (yellow card) 84'; Taylor 71'	Stadium: Spotland Stadium; Attendance: 3,201; Referee: Mick Russell

21 March 2009 38	Wycombe Wanderers	0–1	Rochdale	High Wycombe
15:00 GMT	Spence (yellow card) 29'; Antwi (yellow card) 40'; Woodman (yellow card) 45'	Report	Adams (yellow card) 14'; Thorpe (yellow card) 45'; Wiseman (yellow card) 58'; Le Fondre 90'	Stadium: Adams Park; Attendance: 6,055; Referee: Clive Penton

25 March 2009 39	Chesterfield	3–0	Rochdale	Chesterfield
19:30 GMT	Lester 34', 61'; Niven (yellow card) 71'; Robertson 86'	Report	Le Fondre (yellow card) 28'	Stadium: Saltergate; Attendance: 3,271; Referee: J Singh

28 March 2009 40	Rochdale	2–2	Exeter City	Rochdale
15:00 GMT	Thorpe 27' (yellow card) 71'; Le Fondre 83'; Stanton (yellow card) 89'	Report	Stewart 55', 84' (pen.); Archibald-Henville (yellow card) 82'	Stadium: Spotland Stadium; Attendance: 3,364; Referee: Anthony Bates

4 April 2009 41	Bournemouth	4–0	Rochdale	Bournemouth
15:00 BST	Pitman 12', 67', 90'; Feeney 28'	Report		Stadium: Dean Court; Attendance: 5,092; Referee: R Booth

11 April 2009 42	Rochdale	1–0	Port Vale	Rochdale
15:00 BST	Buckley 36'	Report	Brammer (yellow card) 56'	Stadium: Spotland Stadium; Attendance: 3,100; Referee: Andy Haines

13 April 2009 43	Shrewsbury Town	1–1	Rochdale	Shrewsbury
15:00 BST	Holt 47'; Hibbert (yellow card) 78'; Leslie (yellow card) 84'	Report	Thompson (yellow card) 42'; Thorpe (yellow card) 67'; Dagnall 73' (yellow card) 74'; Stanton (yellow card) 82'	Stadium: New Meadow; Attendance: 6,234; Referee: Roger East

18 April 2009 44	Rochdale	0–2	Darlington	Rochdale
12:45 BST	Keltie (yellow card) 36'	Report	Kennedy 4'; White (yellow card) 57'; McArdle 66' (o.g.); Ravenhill (yellow card) 80'	Stadium: Spotland Stadium; Attendance: 3,789; Referee: Andy D'Urso

25 April 2009 45	Luton Town	1–1	Rochdale	Luton
15:00 BST	Craddock 33' (pen.); Livermore (yellow card) 72'	Report	Thorpe (yellow card) 5'; Dagnall (yellow card) 42'; Rundle 56'	Stadium: Kenilworth Road; Attendance: 7,025; Referee: James Linington

2 May 2009 46	Rochdale	0–1	Gillingham	Rochdale
15:00 BST	Flitcroft (yellow card) 60'	Report	Weston 20'; Jarrett (yellow card) 77'	Stadium: Spotland Stadium; Attendance: 3,480; Referee: Darren Deadman

=== League Two play-offs ===
7 May 2009 1st Leg	Rochdale	0–0	Gillingham	Rochdale
19:45 BST		Report	Nutter (yellow card) 38'; Lewis (yellow card) 57'	Stadium: Spotland Stadium; Referee: Kevin Friend

10 May 2009 2nd Leg	Gillingham	2–1	Rochdale	Gillingham
18:30 BST	Jackson 13', 58' (pen.)	Report	Dagnall 36'; McArdle (yellow card) 57'; Kennedy (yellow card) 59'; Jones (yellow card) 66'; Stanton (yellow card) 73'	Stadium: Priestfield Stadium; Attendance: 9,585; Referee: Michael Oliver

=== FA Cup ===
8 November 2008 1	Barnet	1–1	Rochdale	London
15:00 GMT	Yakubu 67'; Gillet (yellow card) 68'	Report	Dagnall 49'; Jones (yellow card) 63'; Holness (yellow card) 70'	Stadium: Underhill Stadium; Attendance: 1,782; Referee: J. Linnington

18 November 2008 1 (Replay)	Rochdale	3–2 (a.e.t.)	Barnet	Rochdale
19:45 GMT	Le Fondre 56', 73', 105'; McArdle (yellow card) 87'	Report	O'Flynn 10'; Adomah 19'; Deverdics (yellow card) 61'; Bishop (yellow card) 75'; Townsend (yellow card) 117'	Stadium: Spotland Stadium; Attendance: 2,339; Referee: C Webster

29 November 2008 2	Forest Green Rovers	2–0	Rochdale	Nailsworth
15:00 GMT	Smith 27' (yellow card) 45'; Low 56'	Report		Stadium: The New Lawn; Attendance: 1,715; Referee: Graham Scott

=== League Cup ===
12 August 2008 1	Rochdale	0–0 (a.e.t.) (1–4 p)	Oldham Athletic	Rochdale
19:45 BST		Report; Report	Hazell (yellow card) 78'; Davies (red card) 45'; Taylor (yellow card) 119'	Stadium: Spotland Stadium; Attendance: 5,786; Referee: C Webster
	Penalties
	Kennedy (penalty scored); Dagnall (penalty missed); Le Fondre (penalty missed)		Eardley (penalty scored); Taylor (penalty scored); Whitaker (penalty scored); Hughes (penalty scored)

=== League Trophy ===
7 October 2008 1	Rochdale	2–2 (a.e.t.) (4–3 p)	Carlisle United	Rochdale
19:45 BST	Thorpe 10'; Dagnall 15'	Report; Report	Bridges 3'; Madine 70'	Stadium: Spotland Stadium; Attendance: 1,608; Referee: Nigel Miller
	Penalties
	Keltie (penalty scored); Le Fondre (penalty scored); Jones (penalty scored); Toner (penalty scored)		Smith (penalty missed); Bridges (penalty scored); Carlton (penalty scored); Madine (penalty scored); Hackney (penalty missed)

4 November 2008 2	Scunthorpe United	1–0	Rochdale	Scunthorpe
19:30 GMT	Lea (yellow card) 40'; Mirfin (yellow card) 86' (goal) 90'	Report; Report		Stadium: Glanford Park; Attendance: 2,474; Referee: Jonathan Moss
