= 2007–08 Rochdale A.F.C. season =

English football club season

Rochdale
2007–08 season
- Chairman: Chris Dunphy
- Manager: Keith Hill
- League Two: 5th
- FA Cup: First round
- League Cup: First round
- Top goalscorer: League: Adam Le Fondre (16 goals); All: Adam Le Fondre (17 goals)

The 2007–08 season was Rochdale A.F.C.'s 101st in existence and their 34th consecutive in the fourth tier of the English football league (League Two). Rochdale finished the season in 5th place in League Two, but missed out on promotion to League One after losing in the play-off final against Stockport County.

== League table ==
Pos	Team	Pld	W	D	L	GF	GA	GD	Pts	Promotion or relegation
3	Hereford United (P)	46	26	10	10	72	41	+31	88	Promotion to 2008–09 League One
4	Stockport County (O, P)	46	24	10	12	72	54	+18	82	Qualification for League Two playoffs
5	Rochdale	46	23	11	12	77	54	+23	80	Qualification for League Two playoffs
6	Darlington	46	22	12	12	67	40	+27	78	Qualification for League Two playoffs
7	Wycombe Wanderers	46	22	12	12	56	42	+14	78	Qualification for League Two playoffs

Updated to match(es) played on 3 May 2008. Source: The Football League
Rules for classification: 1) points; 2) goal difference; 3) number of goals scored.
(O) Play-off winners; (P) Promoted

== Statistics ==
No.	Pos	Nat	Player	Total		League Two		FA Cup		League Cup		League Trophy		Play-offs	
No.	Pos	Nat	Player	Apps	Goals	Apps	Goals	Apps	Goals	Apps	Goals	Apps	Goals	Apps	Goals
1	GK	(England) ENG	James Spencer	22	0	20 + 0	0	0 + 0	0	2 + 0	0	0 + 0	0	0 + 0	0
2	DF	(England) ENG	Simon Ramsden	41	2	35 + 0	2	0 + 0	0	2 + 0	0	1 + 0	0	3 + 0	0
3	DF	(England) ENG	Tom Kennedy	50	2	43 + 0	2	1 + 0	0	2 + 0	0	1 + 0	0	3 + 0	0
4	DF	(England) ENG	Nathan Stanton	30	0	27 + 0	0	1 + 0	0	0 + 0	0	0 + 0	0	2 + 0	0
5	MF	(England) ENG	John Doolan	28	0	19 + 6	0	0 + 0	0	1 + 0	0	0 + 1	0	0 + 1	0
6	DF	(England) ENG	Lee Crooks	10	0	5 + 4	0	1 + 0	0	0 + 0	0	0 + 0	0	0 + 0	0
7	FW	(England) ENG	Ben Muirhead	36	0	18 + 13	0	0 + 0	0	2 + 0	0	0 + 0	0	0 + 3	0
8	MF	(England) ENG	Gary Jones	50	7	43 + 0	7	1 + 0	0	2 + 0	0	1 + 0	0	3 + 0	0
9	FW	(England) ENG	Chris Dagnall	19	9	7 + 7	7	0 + 0	0	2 + 0	0	0 + 0	0	3 + 0	2
10	FW	(England) ENG	Adam Le Fondre	53	17	30 + 16	16	1 + 0	1	0 + 2	0	1 + 0	0	1 + 2	0
11	MF	(England) ENG	Adam Rundle	49	6	37 + 5	5	0 + 1	0	2 + 0	0	1 + 0	0	3 + 0	1
12	DF	(England) ENG	Nathan D'Laryea	10	0	2 + 4	0	1 + 0	0	1 + 0	0	0 + 0	0	2 + 0	0
15	MF	(England) ENG	Joe Thompson	13	1	5 + 7	1	0 + 0	0	0 + 0	0	0 + 1	0	0 + 0	0
16	MF	(England) ENG	David Perkins	45	6	40 + 0	4	1 + 0	0	1 + 0	1	1 + 0	0	2 + 0	1
17	DF	(England) ENG	Chris Basham	13	0	5 + 8	0	0 + 0	0	0 + 0	0	0 + 0	0	0 + 0	0
17	FW	(England) ENG	Glenn Murray	27	10	21 + 2	9	1 + 0	0	2 + 0	1	1 + 0	0	0 + 0	0
18	FW	(England) ENG	Kallum Higginbotham	38	3	22 + 11	3	1 + 0	0	0 + 0	0	0 + 1	0	3 + 0	0
19	DF	(England) ENG	Kelvin Lomax	10	0	10 + 0	0	0 + 0	0	0 + 0	0	0 + 0	0	0 + 0	0
19	FW	(Northern Ireland) NIR	Lee McEvilly	7	3	3 + 4	3	0 + 0	0	0 + 0	0	0 + 0	0	0 + 0	0
19	FW	(England) ENG	Lee Thorpe	8	1	5 + 3	1	0 + 0	0	0 + 0	0	0 + 0	0	0 + 0	0
20	DF	(England) ENG	Raphale Evans	1	0	1 + 0	0	0 + 0	0	0 + 0	0	0 + 0	0	0 + 0	0
21	GK	(England) ENG	Sam Russell	17	0	15 + 0	0	1 + 0	0	0 + 0	0	1 + 0	0	0 + 0	0
23	DF	(Northern Ireland) NIR	Rory McArdle	49	3	42 + 1	2	1 + 0	0	2 + 0	0	0 + 0	0	3 + 0	1
24	FW	(England) ENG	Rene Howe	23	9	19 + 1	9	0 + 0	0	0 + 0	0	0 + 0	0	2 + 1	0
25	DF	(England) ENG	Guy Branston	6	0	4 + 0	0	0 + 0	0	1 + 0	0	1 + 0	0	0 + 0	0
25	FW	(England) ENG	Ben Wharton	1	0	0 + 1	0	0 + 0	0	0 + 0	0	0 + 0	0	0 + 0	0
26	DF	(England) ENG	Rob Atkinson	2	0	0 + 2	0	0 + 0	0	0 + 0	0	0 + 0	0	0 + 0	0
27	MF	(England) ENG	Rory Prendergast	18	3	2 + 12	1	0 + 1	0	0 + 2	1	1 + 0	1	0 + 0	0
30	MF	(England) ENG	Will Buckley	8	0	1 + 6	0	0 + 0	0	0 + 0	0	0 + 0	0	0 + 1	0
30	FW	(England) ENG	Scott Taylor	4	0	2 + 2	0	0 + 0	0	0 + 0	0	0 + 0	0	0 + 0	0
31	DF	(England) ENG	Marcus Holness	21	0	13 + 6	0	0 + 0	0	0 + 0	0	1 + 0	0	0 + 1	0
32	GK	(England) ENG	Tommy Lee	14	0	11 + 0	0	0 + 0	0	0 + 0	0	0 + 0	0	3 + 0	0
33	MF	(England) ENG	George Bowyer	1	0	0 + 1	0	0 + 0	0	0 + 0	0	0 + 0	0	0 + 0	0

== Competitions ==
=== Pre-season Friendlies ===
21 July 2007	Southport	0–0	Rochdale	Southport
BST		Report		Stadium: Haig Avenue

24 July 2007	Rochdale	2–1	Oldham Athletic	Rochdale
BST	Goal	Report	Goal	Stadium: Spotland

4 August 2007	Northwich Victoria	1–2	Rochdale	Northwich
BST	Goal	Report	Goal	Stadium: Wincham Park

=== League Two ===
11 August 2007 1	Peterborough United	3–0	Rochdale	Peterborough
15:00 BST	Morgan (yellow card) 8'; Low 10'; McLean 10'; Crow 90'	Report; Report		Stadium: London Road; Attendance: 5,575; Referee: Ray Lee

18 August 2007 2	Rochdale	1–2	Chester City	Rochdale
15:00 BST	Ramsden (yellow card) 6' (goal) 21'	Report; Report	Roberts (yellow card) 10'; Linwood (yellow card) 11'; Grant (yellow card) 39' (goal) 58'; Ellison 90'	Stadium: Spotland; Attendance: 3,243; Referee: Steve Bratt

25 August 2007 3	Hereford United	1–1	Rochdale	Hereford
15:00 BST	Robinson 27'; McClenahan (yellow card) 29'; Diagouraga (yellow card) 39'; Brown (yellow card) 81'	Report; Report	Dagnall 22' (pen.); Perkins (yellow card) 68' (yellow-red card) 86'; Murray (yellow card) 81'	Stadium: Edgar Street; Attendance: 2,732; Referee: Graham Horwood

1 September 2007 4	Rochdale	3–2	Milton Keynes Dons	Rochdale
15:00 BST	Doolan (yellow card) 8'; Dagnall 20', 90'; Branston (yellow card) 25'; Kennedy (yellow card) 45'; Le Fondre 90'	Report; Report	Gallen 16', 28'; Swailes (yellow card) 59'; Lewington (yellow card) 73'	Stadium: Spotland; Attendance: 2,743; Referee: Anthony Bates

15 September 2007 5	Barnet	0–0	Rochdale	London
15:00 BST		Report; Report	Branston (yellow card) 80'	Stadium: Underhill; Attendance: 2,040; Referee: Fred Graham

22 September 2007 6	Rochdale	1–1	Macclesfield Town	Rochdale
15:00 BST	McNulty (o.g.) 17'; Branston (yellow card) 30'; Lomax (yellow card) 55'; Doolan (yellow card) 69'	Report; Report	McIntyre 22' (pen.) (yellow card) 60'; Edghill (yellow card) 37'; Dimech (yellow card) 61'	Stadium: Spotland; Attendance: 3,066; Referee: Andy Haines

29 September 2007 7	Shrewsbury Town	3–4	Rochdale	Shrewsbury
15:00 BST	Hibbert 38'; Drummond 62' (yellow card); Hunt 88'; Langmead (yellow card); Nicholson (yellow card)	Report; Report	Rundle 46'; Murray 80' (yellow card); Jones 85'; Le Fondre 90'; Muirhead (yellow card); Higginbotham (yellow card)	Stadium: New Meadow; Attendance: 6,262; Referee: Steven Cook

2 October 2007 8	Darlington	1–1	Rochdale	Darlington
19:30 BST	Wright 59'; Foster (yellow card)	Report; Report	Prendergast 88' (yellow card); Le Fondre (yellow card)	Stadium: The Darlington Arena; Attendance: 3,031; Referee: Carl Boyeson

6 October 2007 9	Rochdale	1–2	Bury	Rochdale
15:00 BST	McArdle 61'; Doolan (yellow card)	Report; Report	Mangan 2'; Adams 12'; Futcher (yellow card); Bishop (yellow card)	Stadium: Spotland; Attendance: 4,692; Referee: Mike Pike

12 October 2007 10	Grimsby Town	1–2	Rochdale	Cleethorpes
19:45 BST	Logan 18'	Report; Report	Le Fondre 12'; McArdle (yellow card) 34'; Jones (yellow card) 49'; Murray 59'	Stadium: Blundell Park; Attendance: 5,829; Referee: Dean Whitestone

20 October 2007 11	Rochdale	1–1	Brentford	Rochdale
15:00 BST	Murray 63'	Report; Report	Charles (yellow card) 45'; Poole 88'	Stadium: Spotland; Attendance: 2,424; Referee: Michael Oliver

27 October 2007 12	Morecambe	1–1	Rochdale	Morecambe
15:00 BST	Artell 17' (yellow card) 55'; Stanley (yellow card) 65'; Twiss (red card) 67'; Howard (yellow card) 90'	Report; Report	McArdle 55' (yellow card) 87'	Stadium: Christie Park; Attendance: 3,651; Referee: Kevin Friend

3 November 2007 13	Rochdale	1–0	Dagenham & Redbridge	Rochdale
15:00 GMT	Foster 59' (o.g.); Holness (yellow card) 38'	Report; Report		Stadium: Spotland; Attendance: 2,278; Referee: Dave Foster

6 November 2007 14	Rochdale	1–2	Stockport County	Rochdale
19:45 GMT	Kennedy (yellow card) 37'; Le Fondre 69' (pen.); McArdle (yellow card) 75'	Report; Report	Dickinson 28', 53'; Tierney (yellow card) 35'; Taylor (yellow card) 37'	Stadium: Spotland; Attendance: 2,915; Referee: Mike Jones

24 November 2007 15	Rochdale	1–0	Mansfield Town	Rochdale
15:00 GMT	McEvilly 67'	Report; Report		Stadium: Spotland; Attendance: 2,431; Referee: Colin Webster

1 December 2007 16	Rochdale	0–0	Wrexham	Rochdale
15:00 GMT	Higginbotham (yellow card) 21'; Murray (yellow card) 66'	Report; Report	Taylor (yellow card) 40'; Baynes (yellow card) 56'	Stadium: Spotland; Attendance: 2,808; Referee: Mark Haywood

5 December 2007 17	Accrington Stanley	1–2	Rochdale	Accrington
19:45 GMT	Richardson (yellow card) 21'; Craney 23'; Roberts (yellow card) 54'	Report; Report	Perkins (red card) 20'; Higginbotham 56'; Kennedy (yellow card) 58'; Murray 75'	Stadium: Crown Ground; Attendance: 1,621; Referee: Neil Swarbrick

8 December 2007 18	Rotherham United	2–4	Rochdale	Rotherham
15:00 GMT	Sharps 14'; Holmes 16'; Brogan (yellow card) 53'; Harrison (yellow card) 90'	Report; Report	Jones 4'; Le Fondre 7'; Ramsden (yellow card) 19'; Murray 48'; Kennedy (yellow card) 85'; McEvilly 90'; Rundle (yellow card) 90'	Stadium: Millmoor; Attendance: 3,808; Referee: Iain Williamson

26 December 2007 19	Wrexham	0–2	Rochdale	Wrexham
15:00 GMT	Spann (yellow card) 4'	Report; Report	Murray 7' (yellow card) 40'; McEvilly 60'	Stadium: Racecourse Ground; Attendance: 4,302; Referee: Karl Evans

29 December 2007 20	Macclesfield Town	2–2	Rochdale	Macclesfield
15:00 GMT	Reid 20'; Evans 30'	Report; Report	Higginbotham (yellow card) 18'; Rundle 63'; Murray 90'	Stadium: Moss Rose; Attendance: 2,742; Referee: Steven Cook

1 January 2008 21	Rochdale	3–1	Darlington	Rochdale
15:00 GMT	Thompson 22'; Rundle (yellow card) 36'; Murray 37'; Le Fondre 45' (pen.); McArdle (yellow card) 90'	Report; Report	White (yellow card) 31' (yellow-red card) 74'; Austin (yellow card) 36'; Keltie 54' (pen.); Ravenhill (yellow card) 55'; Wright (yellow card) 81'	Stadium: Spotland; Attendance: 3,116; Referee: Robert Lewis

5 January 2008 22	Rochdale	0–2	Lincoln City	Rochdale
15:00 GMT	Thompson (yellow card) 37'; Murray (yellow card) 71'	Report; Report	Brown (yellow card) 72'; Forrester 82'; Frecklington 83'	Stadium: Spotland; Attendance: 2,721; Referee: Rob Shoebridge

12 January 2008 23	Wycombe Wanderers	0–1	Rochdale	Wycombe
15:00 GMT	McCracken (yellow card) 90'; Knight (yellow card) 90'	Report; Report	Higginbotham (yellow card) 33'; McArdle (yellow card) 81'; Kennedy 90' (pen.)	Stadium: Adams Park; Attendance: 4,493; Referee: Gavin Ward

16 January 2008 24	Chesterfield	3–4	Rochdale	Chesterfield
15:00 GMT	Downes 49'; Lester 59' (yellow card) 67'; Rooney 90'	Report; Report	Perkins 18', 39', 86'; Stanton (yellow card) 67'; Murray 88'	Stadium: Saltergate Recreation Ground; Attendance: 3,595; Referee: Andy Haines

26 January 2008 25	Milton Keynes Dons	0–1	Rochdale	Milton Keynes
15:00 GMT	Johnson (yellow card) 75'	Report; Report	Stanton (yellow card) 13' (yellow-red card) 13'; Jones 32'; Russell (yellow card) 63'; Perkins (yellow card) 72'	Stadium: Stadium MK; Attendance: 7,882; Referee: Mike Thorpe

29 January 2008 26	Chester City	0–4	Rochdale	Chester
19:45 GMT	Wilson (yellow card) 29' (yellow-red card) 86'; Ellison (red card) 32'; Butler (yellow card) 64'; Lindfield (yellow card) 90'	Report; Report	Le Fondre 29'; Butler 44' (o.g.); Kennedy 60'; Rundle 88'	Stadium: Deva Stadium; Attendance: 2,131; Referee: Richard Beeby

2 February 2008 27	Rochdale	0–2	Peterborough United	Rochdale
15:00 GMT	Jones (yellow card) 69'	Report; Report	Boyd 57'; McLean 76'	Stadium: Spotland; Attendance: 3,076; Referee: Darren Drysdale

9 February 2008 28	Lincoln City	2–1	Rochdale	Lincoln
15:00 GMT	Forrester 45'; Hone 81' (yellow card) 90'; Dodds (yellow card) ?'	Report; Report	Howe 56'; Higginbotham (yellow card) 78'; Stanton (yellow card) 82'	Stadium: Sincil Bank; Attendance: 3,955; Referee: Andy Woolmer

12 February 2008 29	Rochdale	2–4	Hereford United	Rochdale
19:45 GMT	Ramsden 7'; Howe 90'	Report; Report	MacDonald 14', 21', 31'; Hooper 73'	Stadium: Spotland; Attendance: 2,884; Referee: Scott Mathieson

16 February 2008 30	Bradford City	1–2	Rochdale	Bradford
15:00 GMT	Thorne 45'	Report; Report	Clarke 12' (o.g.); Thorpe (yellow card) 72'; Le Fondre 90'	Stadium: Valley Parade; Attendance: 14,017; Referee: Carl Boyeson

23 February 2008 31	Rochdale	0–1	Wycombe Wanderers	Rochdale
15:00 GMT	Kennedy (yellow card) 42'	Report; Report	Knight 13'; Doherty (yellow card) 53'; Sutton (yellow card) 88'	Stadium: Spotland; Attendance: 2,616; Referee: Graham Laws

1 March 2008 32	Rochdale	0–1	Chesterfield	Rochdale
15:00 GMT	Stanton (yellow card) 89'	Report; Report	Downes (yellow card) 44'; Hartley (yellow card) 66'; Ward (yellow card) 74'; Leven 89'	Stadium: Spotland; Attendance: 3,108; Referee: Clive Oliver

8 March 2008 33	Mansfield Town	0–4	Rochdale	Mansfield
15:00 GMT	Louis (yellow card) 74'	Report; Report	Jones 27', 55'; Le Fondre 47'; Howe 67'	Stadium: Field Mill; Attendance: 2,351; Referee: Paul Armstrong

11 March 2008 34	Stockport County	2–0	Rochdale	Stockport
19:45 GMT	Dickinson 10', 56'	Report; Report		Stadium: Edgeley Park; Attendance: 5,530; Referee: Nigel Miller

16 March 2008 35	Rochdale	4–1	Accrington Stanley	Rochdale
14:00 GMT	Le Fondre 45' (pen.), 65', 83' (yellow card) 48'? Jones 48' (yellow card) 48'? Basham (yellow card) 52'	Report; Report	Whalley 34'; Mullin (yellow card) 24'	Stadium: Spotland; Attendance: 3,247; Referee: Paul Taylor

22 March 2008 36	Notts County	1–0	Rochdale	Nottingham
15:00 GMT	Edwards (yellow card) 24'; Johnson 28'	Report; Report	Kennedy (yellow card) 82'	Stadium: Meadow Lane; Attendance: 4,030; Referee: Ray Lee

24 March 2008 37	Rochdale	4–1	Rotherham United	Rochdale
15:00 GMT	Jones 30'; Dagnall 81', 86', 90'; Thorpe (yellow card) 71'	Report; Report	Joseph 7'; Harrison (yellow card) 57'; Holmes (yellow card) 77'; Taylor (yellow card) 90'	Stadium: Spotland; Attendance: 2,985; Referee: Andy Woolmer

29 March 2008 38	Brentford	0–2	Rochdale	Brentford
15:00 GMT		Report; Report	Thorpe 76'; Rundle 90'	Stadium: Griffin Park; Attendance: 4,896; Referee: Stuart Attwell

1 April 2008 39	Rochdale	2–1	Bradford City	Rochdale
19:45 BST	Perkins 1' (yellow card) 56'; Le Fondre 87'; Ramsden (yellow card) 32'; Muirhead (yellow card) 45'	Report; Report	Thorne 60' (pen.); Colbeck (yellow card) 77'	Stadium: Spotland; Attendance: 3,811; Referee: Andy Haines

4 April 2008 40	Rochdale	3–1	Grimsby Town	Rochdale
15:00 BST	Perkins (yellow card) 35'; Howe 47', 55', 90'; Le Fondre (yellow card) 90'	Report; Report	Hunt (yellow card) 15'; Jarman (yellow card) 33' (yellow-red card) 37'; Taylor 85'	Stadium: Spotland; Attendance: 2,974; Referee: Danny McDermid

8 April 2008 41	Rochdale	4–2	Notts County	Rochdale
19:45 BST	Howe 58'; Rundle 70'; Le Fondre 78'; Johnson 85' (o.g.)	Report; Report	Hunt (yellow card) 65'; Lee 72'; MacKenzie 90' (pen.)	Stadium: Spotland; Attendance: 3,536; Referee: Dean Whitestone

12 April 2008 42	Dagenham & Redbridge	1–1	Rochdale	Dagenham
15:00 BST	Strevens 33'; Nurse (yellow card) 76'; Gain (yellow card) 90'	Report; Report	Higginbotham 28' (yellow card) 74'; Ramsden (yellow card) 37'; Basham (yellow card) 86'	Stadium: Victoria Road; Attendance: 2,032; Referee: Roger East

15 April 2008 43	Rochdale	3–0	Barnet	Rochdale
19:45 BST	Le Fondre 34'; Howe 50'; Higginbotham 72'	Report; Report	Burton (yellow card) 55'	Stadium: Spotland; Attendance: 2,925; Referee: Andy Hall

19 April 2008 44	Rochdale	1–0	Morecambe	Rochdale
15:00 BST	Holness (yellow card) 17'; Howe 66'	Report; Report	Yates (yellow card) 77'; McStay (yellow card) 89'	Stadium: Spotland; Attendance: 3,706; Referee: Jonathan Moss

26 April 2008 45	Bury	1–1	Rochdale	Bury
15:00 BST	Adams 56'; Futcher (yellow card) 74' (yellow-red card) 78'; Bishop (yellow card) 89'	Report; Report	Stanton (red card) 30'; Jones (yellow card) 37'; Rundle (yellow card) 65'; Le Fondre 90' (pen.)	Stadium: Gigg Lane; Attendance: 6,271; Referee: Mike Jones

3 May 2008 46	Rochdale	1–1	Shrewsbury Town	Rochdale
15:00 BST	Dagnall 54'; Thompson (yellow card) 70'; Le Fondre (yellow card) 78'; Muirhead (yellow card) 88'	Report; Report	Hall 34'; Meredith (yellow card) 47'; McIntyre (yellow card) 49'; Pugh (yellow card) 62'	Stadium: Spotland; Attendance: 4,000; Referee: Anthony Bates

=== League Two play-offs ===
10 May 2008 1st Leg	Darlington	2–1	Rochdale	Darlington
17:35 BST	Kennedy 28'; Miller 90'	Report; Report	Dagnall 70'; Jones (yellow card) 90'	Stadium: The Darlington Arena; Attendance: 8,057; Referee: Paul Armstrong

17 May 2008 2nd Leg	Rochdale	2–1 (a.e.t.) (5–4 p)	Darlington	Rochdale
12:00 BST	Howe (yellow card) 29'; Dagnall 43'; Perkins 78' (red card) 109'	Report; Report	Keltie 28' (pen.); Wainwright (yellow card) 33'; Ravenhill (yellow card) 49'; White (yellow card) 74'	Stadium: Spotland; Attendance: 6,271; Referee: Richard Beeby
	Penalties
	Dagnall (penalty scored); Kennedy (penalty scored); Le Fondre (penalty scored); Jones (penalty scored); Muirhead (penalty scored)		(penalty scored) Guylain; (penalty scored) Purdie; (penalty scored) Wainwright; (penalty scored) Ravenhill; (penalty missed) Kennedy

26 May 2008 Final	Stockport County	3–2	Rochdale	London
15:00 BST	Stanton 34' (o.g.); Pilkington 49'; Dickinson 67'; McSweeney (yellow card) 88'; Logan (yellow card) 90'	Report; Report	McArdle 24' (yellow card) 83'; Rundle 77'; Stanton (yellow card) 69'	Stadium: Wembley; Attendance: 35,715; Referee: Stuart Attwell

=== FA Cup ===
10 November 2007 1	Southend United	2–1	Rochdale	Southend
15:00 GMT	Bailey 1'; Harrold 24' (pen.); Gower (yellow card) 80'	Report; Report	Le Fondre 12'; D'Laryea (yellow card) 33'; McArdle (yellow card) 37'; Stanton (yellow card) 85'; Jones (yellow card) 90'	Stadium: Roots Hall; Attendance: 5,180; Referee: Graham Horwood

=== League Cup ===
14 August 2007 1	Rochdale	2–2 (a.e.t.) (4–2 p)	Stoke City	Rochdale
19:45 BST	Le Fondre (yellow card) 72'; Perkins 83'; D'Laryea (yellow card) 89'; Prendergast 101'	Report; Report	Shawcross 4'; Cresswell (yellow card) 68' (goal) 120'; Dickinson (yellow card) 78'	Stadium: Spotland; Attendance: 2,369; Referee: Mark Haywood
	Penalties
	Kennedy (penalty scored); Le Fondre (penalty missed); Prendergast (penalty scored); Muirhead (penalty scored); Jones (penalty scored)		Cresswell (penalty missed); Pulis (penalty scored); Lawrence (penalty scored); Dickinson (penalty missed)

28 August 2007 2	Rochdale	1–1 (a.e.t.) (3–4 p)	Norwich City	Rochdale
19:45 BST	Murray 9'; Ramsden (yellow card) 49'; McArdle (yellow card) 105'; Muirhead (yellow card) 109'	Report; Report	Brellier (yellow card) 27'; Dublin 49'; Doherty (yellow card) 83'	Stadium: Spotland; Attendance: 2,990; Referee: Colin Webster
	Penalties
	Kennedy (penalty scored); Le Fondre (penalty scored); Prendergast (penalty missed); Dagnall (penalty scored); Jones (penalty missed)		Brown (penalty scored); Lappin (penalty scored); Martin (penalty scored); Huckerby (penalty scored)

=== League Trophy ===
9 October 2007	Rochdale	1–3	Bury	Rochdale
19:00 BST	Prendergast 45'	Report; Report	Hurst 57', 84'; Rouse 82'	Stadium: Spotland; Attendance: 2,376; Referee: Eddie Ilderton
