= 2003–04 Stockport County F.C. season =

Stockport County
2003–04 season
- Chairman: Brian Kennedy
- Manager: Carlton Palmer (Player-Manager) (Until 19 September 2003); Sammy McIlroy (From 15 October 2003)
- Stadium: Edgeley Park
- Second Division: 19th
- FA Cup: First Round
- League Cup: Second Round
- Football League Trophy: Northern section Quarter Finals (Last 16)
- Top goalscorer: Rickie Lambert (12)
- Highest home attendance: 8,617 vs Oldham Athletic, Second Division, 12 April 2004
- Lowest home attendance: 3,683 vs Colchester United, Second Division 21 October 2003
- Average home league attendance: 5,314
Home colours	Away colours

The 2003–04 season is Stockport County's 122nd season in football. Stockport finished the league season in 19th, two places off the relegation zone. This season ran from 9 August 2003 to 8 May 2004.

== Background ==
Following a poor start to the 2003–2004 season player-manager Carlton Palmer was sacked by the club in September.

Upon completion of the Euro 2004 qualifying matches with Northern Ireland, Sammy McIlroy re-entered club management signing a three-year deal in October 2003.

== Summary ==
=== Second Division table ===
Pos	Team	Pld	W	D	L	GF	GA	GD	Pts	Promotion or relegation
17	Brentford	46	14	11	21	52	69	−17	53	
18	Peterborough United	46	12	16	18	58	58	0	52	
19	Stockport County	46	11	19	16	62	70	−8	52	
20	Chesterfield	46	12	15	19	49	71	−22	51	
21	Grimsby Town (R)	46	13	11	22	55	81	−26	50	Relegation to Football League Two

Rules for classification: In the Football League goals scored (GF) takes precedence over goal difference (GD).
(R) Relegated

== Statistics ==
=== Goalscorers ===
No.	Pos	Name	Total
10	MF	Rickie Lambert	12
8	FW	Aaron Wilbraham	8
21	FW	Stuart Barlow	8
12	DF	Jim Goodwin	4
9	FW	Luke Beckett	4
23	MF	Chris Williams	3
31	FW	Simon Lynch	3
16	FW	Jon Daly	3
14	MF	Fraser McLachlan	3
5	DF	Robert Clare	3
3	MF	Danny Jackman	2
6	MF	Mark Robertson	1
20	FW	Owen Morrison	1
19	MF	Andy Welsh	1
15	FW	Kevin Ellison	1
24	FW	Michael Byrne	1
2	DF	Danny Griffin	1

== Results ==
=== Legend ===
Win	Draw	Loss

=== Second Division ===
9 August 2003	Wycombe Wanderers	1–0	Stockport County	The Causeway Stadium, High Wycombe
15:00

=== FA Cup ===
First Round

8 November 2003	Stevenage Borough	2–1	Stockport County	Broadhall Way, Stevenage
15.00

=== League Cup ===
First Round

12 August 2003	Lincoln City	0–1	Stockport County	Sincil Bank, Lincoln
19.45			Barlow 87'

=== Football League Trophy ===
First Round

14 October 2003	Mansfield Town	1–2	Stockport County	Field Mill, Mansfield
19.00

== Team ==
=== Squad ===
Note: Flags indicate national team as defined under FIFA eligibility rules; some limited exceptions apply. Players may hold more than one non-FIFA nationality.

No.	Pos.	Nation	Player
2	DF	NIR	Danny Griffin
3	DF	ENG	Danny Jackman
4	DF	ENG	Dave Challinor
5	DF	ENG	Robert Clare
6	MF	AUS	Mark Robertson
7	DF	ENG	Aaron Lescott
8	FW	ENG	Aaron Wilbraham
9	FW	ENG	Luke Beckett
10	MF	ENG	Rickie Lambert
11	MF	ENG	Martin Pemberton
12	DF	IRL	Jim Goodwin
13	GK	ENG	James Spencer
14	MF	ENG	Fraser McLachlan
15	FW	ENG	Kevin Ellison
16	FW	IRL	Jon Daly

No.	Pos.	Nation	Player
18	DF	ENG	John Hardiker
19	MF	ENG	Andy Welsh
20	FW	NIR	Owen Morrison
21	MF	ENG	Stuart Barlow
22	MF	ENG	Lee Cartwright
23	FW	ENG	Chris Williams
24	FW	ENG	Michael Byrne
25	FW	ENG	Adam Le Fondre
27	FW	ENG	David Holt
28	MF	ENG	Jamie Baguley
29	FW	ENG	Matt Bailey
30	DF	ENG	Alex Lord
31	DF	ENG	Danny Adams
32	GK	ENG	Ben Coppinger
33	DF	WAL	Ashley Williams

==== Left during the season ====
No.	Position	Name	To	Notes
1	GK	(Wales) Lee Jones	(England) Blackpool	
1	GK	(Wales) Boaz Myhill	(England) Aston Villa	Loan Expired
2	DF	(England) Shaun Smith	(England) Hull City	Loan Expired
3	DF	(England) Anthony Tonkin	(England) Crewe Alexandra	
6	MF	(England) Carlton Palmer	Unattached	Sacked as Player Manager (Subsequently, left the club)
6	DF	(England) Matt Heath	(England) Leicester City	Loan Expired
24	MF	(England) Wayne Collins	Unattached	
25	GK	(Republic of Ireland) Nick Colgan	(England) Hibernian	Loan Expired
25	GK	(Wales) Anthony Williams	(England) Hartlepool United	Loan Expired
25	MF	(England) Ali Gibb	(England) Bristol Rovers	
31	MF	(Scotland) Simon Lynch	(England) Preston North End	Loan Expired
31	MF	(England) Dave Walton	(England) Derby County	Loan Expired
