= Stretford Grammar School =

Location
- Granby Road; Stretford, Greater Manchester, M32 8JB; England; 53°26′37″N 2°17′52″W

Information
- Type: Foundation grammar school
- Motto: Aspirat primo fortuna labori
- Established: 1928; 98 years ago
- Local authority: Trafford
- Department for Education URN: 106368 Tables
- Ofsted: Reports
- Chair of Governors: H. Almond
- Headteacher: E. Baxter
- Gender: Mixed
- Age: 11 to 18
- Enrolment: 754 (440 boys, 314 girls)
- Website: http://www.stretfordgrammar.com

Stretford Grammar School is a grammar school in Stretford, in the Trafford borough of Greater Manchester, England, located on a 15-acre plot.

== Admissions ==
The school includes a sixth form and years 7 to 11. Almost two-thirds of pupils are from minority ethnic backgrounds, and approximately 30% have a first language other than English, significantly above the national average.

== History ==
The first head master was Albert Dakin. The first foundation stone of the school was laid on 1 July 1927. The building, built by Lancashire County Council, cost £40,745. The boys' school opened on 12 September 1928, and was officially opened on 23 October 1928 by Eustace Percy, 1st Baron Percy of Newcastle, and was on Great Stone Road west of Lancashire's cricket ground. The girls' grammar school, named Stretford Girls' High School, opened in 1923 on Herbert Street.

In January 1941, the site of the girls' school was destroyed by the bombing. Nearby Trafford Park produced important war materials, including Rolls-Royce Merlin engines made at Ford's factory. A new girls' school was built on a different site near Longford Park and south of Edge Lane (A5145); the former site was converted into playing fields. The school was administered by the Stretford Divisional Executive of the Lancashire Education Committee until April 1974, when it was taken over by Trafford Metropolitan Borough Council.

Until its merger in 1986 with Stretford Grammar School for Boys, it had been known since 1960 as Stretford Grammar School for Girls (the schools changed their names at the same time). The site of the boys' grammar school then became Stretford High School, a community secondary school.

Plans to build a City Technology College on the boys' school site in 1988 were dropped. At the time of the merger, six secondary schools closed in Trafford, resulting in the loss of 4,500 school places.

== Academic performance ==
Academically, the school's exam results are above national averages, with 92% of pupils achieving A*–C in at least five GCSEs (including English and Mathematics). The school's value added score is below the local authority average.

In March 2009, Stretford became the first grammar school in the UK to be placed under special measures, following a critical Ofsted report that cited low-level behavior problems, inadequate teaching, and poor leadership and management. The school had been assessed as "satisfactory" in its March 2006 Ofsted report and exited Special Measures Status in March 2010. In 2012, two-thirds of students achieved the target of 5A/A* grades, and a quarter of students achieved at least 10 grades at A/A*.

== Notable former pupils ==
- Kay Adshead, actress and director
- Air Chief Marshal Sir Anthony Bagnall CBE, KCB, Station Commander of RAF Leuchars from 1987 to 1990, AOC of No. 11 Group RAF from 1994 to 1996, and Commander-in-Chief of RAF Strike Command from 2000 to 2001
- Alfred Bates, Labour MP for Bebington and Ellesmere Port from 1974 to 1979 (later Trafford MBC councillor from 1992 to 2000)
- Ahmad Benali - former Manchester City footballer
- Henry Davidson, flying ace with the RAF during the Second World War
- Brenda Dean, Baroness Dean of Thornton-le-Fylde, trade unionist (left school at 16)
- Sir Tony Lloyd, Labour MP for Stretford from 1983 to 1997 and Manchester Central from 1997, was a pupil from 1962 to 1969.
- Jonathan D'Laryea, footballer
- Nathan D'Laryea, footballer
- Ernest Marples, UK Conservative Minister of Transport from 1959 to 1964, and MP for Wallasey from 1945 to 1964. Marples was responsible for introducing parking meters, yellow no-parking lines, and motorways.
- Adie Mike, footballer
- Ian McShane, actor
- Debbie Moore CBE, businesswoman
- John Mulkern CBE, JP, managing director and board member British Airports Authority 1977–1987, Chairman British Airports International 1978–82, President Western European Airports Association 1981–83
- Peter Noone, singer Herman's Hermits, 1959–64
- Prof John Tomlinson CBE, Professor of Education from 1985 to 1997 at the University of Warwick, Director of Education for Cheshire from 1972 to 1984, and Chairman of National Institute for Careers Education and Counselling (NICEC, and part of the Careers Research and Advisory Centre) 1985–89
- Brian Trueman, presented Screen Test in the early 1980s and worked with Cosgrove Hall Films, narrating 1970s and 1980s cartoons
- Rear-Admiral John Trythall OBE CB
- Sir Arnold Wolfendale, Astronomer Royal
