= Will Buckley (footballer) =

English footballer (born 1989)

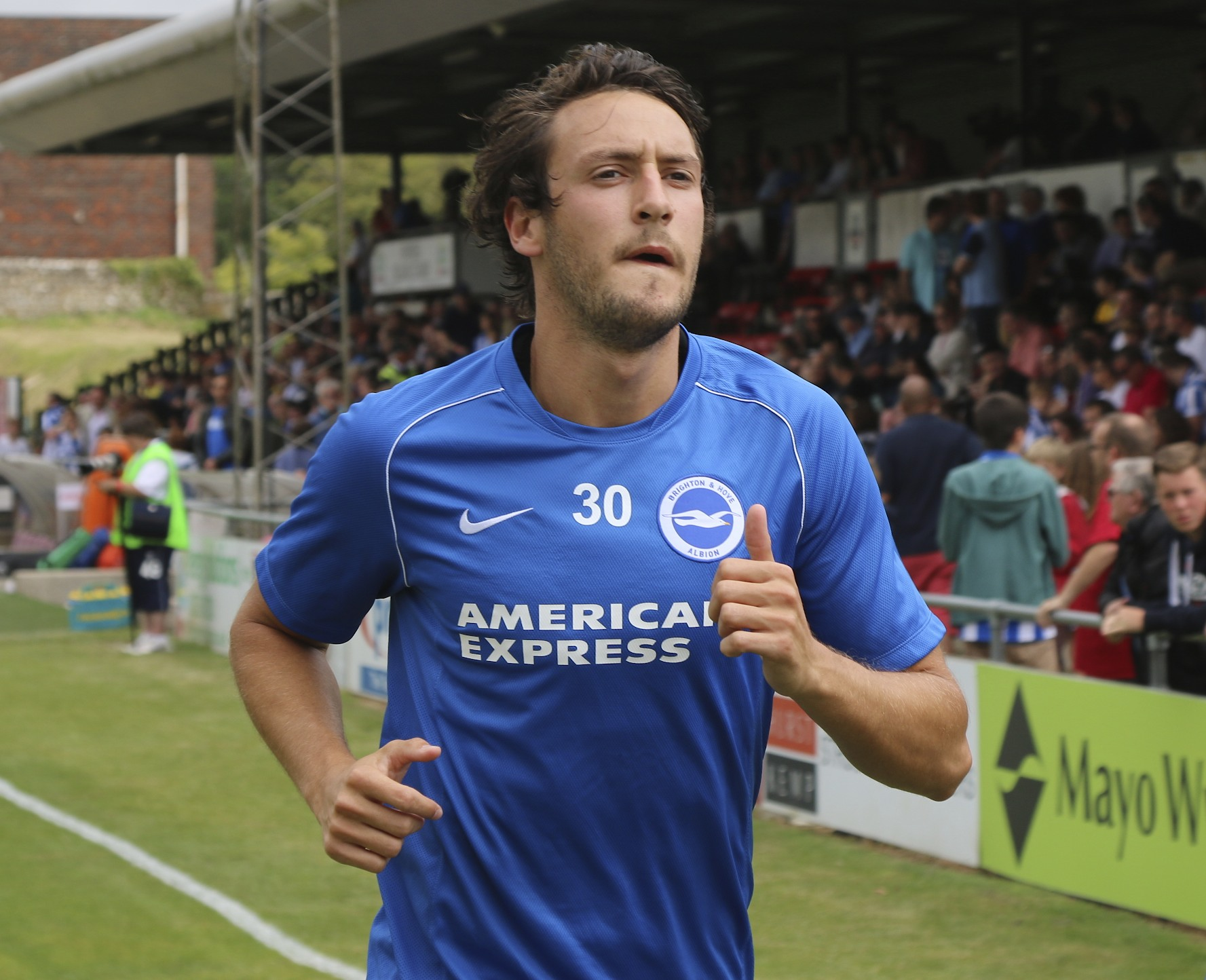
- Buckley with Brighton & Hove Albion in 2014

Personal information
- Full name: William Edward Buckley
- Date of birth: 21 November 1989 (age 36)
- Place of birth: Oldham, England
- Height: 6 ft 0 in (1.83 m)
- Position: Winger

Youth career
- 2006–2008: Rochdale

Senior career*
Years	Team	Apps	(Gls)
2008–2010	Rochdale	59	(13)
2010–2011	Watford	39	(5)
2011–2014	Brighton & Hove Albion	96	(19)
2014–2017	Sunderland	22	(0)
2015	→ Leeds United (loan)	4	(0)
2016	→ Birmingham City (loan)	10	(1)
2016	→ Sheffield Wednesday (loan)	11	(0)
2017–2020	Bolton Wanderers	62	(6)
Total		303	(44)
- * Club domestic league appearances and goals

William Edward Buckley (born 21 November 1989) is an English former professional footballer who played as a winger.

In a career playing in all top four English leagues he started at local side, Rochdale, then going on to play for Watford, Brighton & Hove Albion and Sunderland, and had brief loan spells with Leeds United, Birmingham City and Sheffield Wednesday, finishing his career with Bolton Wanderers after a three-year spell.

== Career ==
=== Rochdale ===
Buckley started his career at Rochdale, becoming a youth scholar in 2006. Prior to that, Buckley started out at Oldham Athletic before being released. Following this, Buckley was rejected by clubs, such as, Bolton Wanderers, Bury and Accrington Stanley after going on trial before settling at Rochdale.

Having played in the club's reserve side, he went on to make his first league appearance in Rochdale's 4–2 home defeat against Hereford United on 12 February 2008. He made a second substitute appearance in a 2–1 away at Bradford City on 16 February, before making his first start for the club in a 1–0 defeat against Wycombe Wanderers on 23 February. Buckley made four more appearances, all as a substitute, in the regular season as Rochdale finished fifth. Buckley did not feature in either leg of Rochdale's League Two play-off semi-final victory over Darlington. However, he made an appearance in the final at Wembley, where Rochdale played Stockport County for a place in League One. Buckley came on as a 73rd-minute substitute for Nathan D'Laryea with Rochdale 3–1 down. They went on to lose 3–2.

After not playing in the first four games of the 2008–09 season, Buckley started a run of seven consecutive league starts. In the third of these, a 2–2 draw away at Rotherham United on 13 September 2008, Buckley scored his first professional goal. He then scored in the two subsequent games on 20 September and 28 September 2008 against Chesterfield and Accrington Stanley. By the end of 2008, Buckley went on to score three more goals. In January 2009, Buckley was named in a Times newspaper article about rising stars in the game. After being sidelined for two matches, Buckley scored on his return to the first team from absent, as well as, assisting one of the goals, in a 3–1 win over Accrington Stanley on 3 January 2009. Later in the 2008–09 season, Buckley scored five more goals, adding the total of making 41 appearances and scored 10 goals in the regular season. Rochdale finished sixth to again qualify for the play-offs. Buckley started the first leg of the semi-final, a 0–0 draw at home to Gillingham, before being substituted for Joe Thompson. In the second leg Buckley came off the bench to replace Thompson with all the goals in the 2–1 defeat already scored.

Despite attracted interests from clubs ahead of the 2009–10 season, Buckley started the opening game of the season well when he set up a goal for Joe Thompson in a 1–1 draw against Port Vale. Then in September 2009, Buckley scored three goals in a spell of three consecutive games against Northampton Town, Hereford United and Darlington. Despite suffering from injuries, Buckley made 18 appearances for Rochdale in 2009–10, scoring 3 goals in a spell of 3 consecutive games in September 2009.

=== Watford ===
On 26 January 2010, Buckley transferred to Championship club Watford, signing a three-and-a-half-year contract. At his time of departure Rochdale were nine points clear at the top of League Two. The move was reported to be £300,000, as well as adding a sell on clause.

On signing, Watford manager Malky Mackay said of Buckley:

Will's an exciting young talent who has impacted upon Rochdale ... There's a lot of growth and potential in him. ... Will's an attacking player who is comfortable on either wing and can play up and off a forward as well, he's definitely someone who is attack-minded ... we don't have the financial luxury of signing players from the Championship and the Premiership on the whole, therefore we need to look to see where the best young talent is coming through in the lower leagues, the Conference and up in Scotland as well.

After recovering from a thigh strain, Buckley was eventually given his Watford debut (following 90 minutes and a goal for the reserves) on 21 March 2010 in a 3–1 defeat at Cardiff City, replacing Don Cowie in the 67th minute. After coming on as a 90th-minute substitute for his home debut on 24 March 2010, Buckley made his full debut in a 1–1 draw against Middlesbrough on 27 March. He scored his first Watford goal on 3 April against Preston North End and Watford drew the game 1–1. However, Buckley suffered another injury that kept him out of action for the rest of the season. In his first half season at Watford, Buckley made six appearances and scoring once.

Ahead of the 2010–11 season, Buckley switched number shirt from 22 to 11. After scoring a hat-trick against Boreham Wood in the pre-season friendly, Manager Malky Mackay hope the partnership of Buckley and Danny Graham for their performance. At the start of the season, Buckley scored his first goal of the season on 14 August 2010, in a 2–2 draw against Coventry City. From that moment on, Buckley had a handful of first team appearances, playing in the wide man position and appeared on the substitute bench throughout October and November before regaining his first team place. It wasn't until on 4 December 2010 when he scored his second goal of the season, in a 3–2 win over Leicester City. He then scored two goals in two matches between 15 January 2011 and 22 January 2011 against Derby County and Cardiff City. His performance saw him being named Football League Young Player of the Month for December. Despite suffering from ankle injury and appearing on the substitute, Buckley went on to finish the season, making thirty-seven appearances and scoring four times in all competitions. Following this, Buckley was named the Young Player of the Year Award.

=== Brighton & Hove Albion ===
On 6 June 2011, Buckley signed for Brighton & Hove Albion for a then club record fee of £1 million. It came after when Watford rejected bids from Brighton & Hove Albion for him last month. Upon signing for the club, Buckley stated his time at Watford saw the lack the best of him, but nevertheless thanked the club's supporters when he under performed.

==== 2011–12 season ====
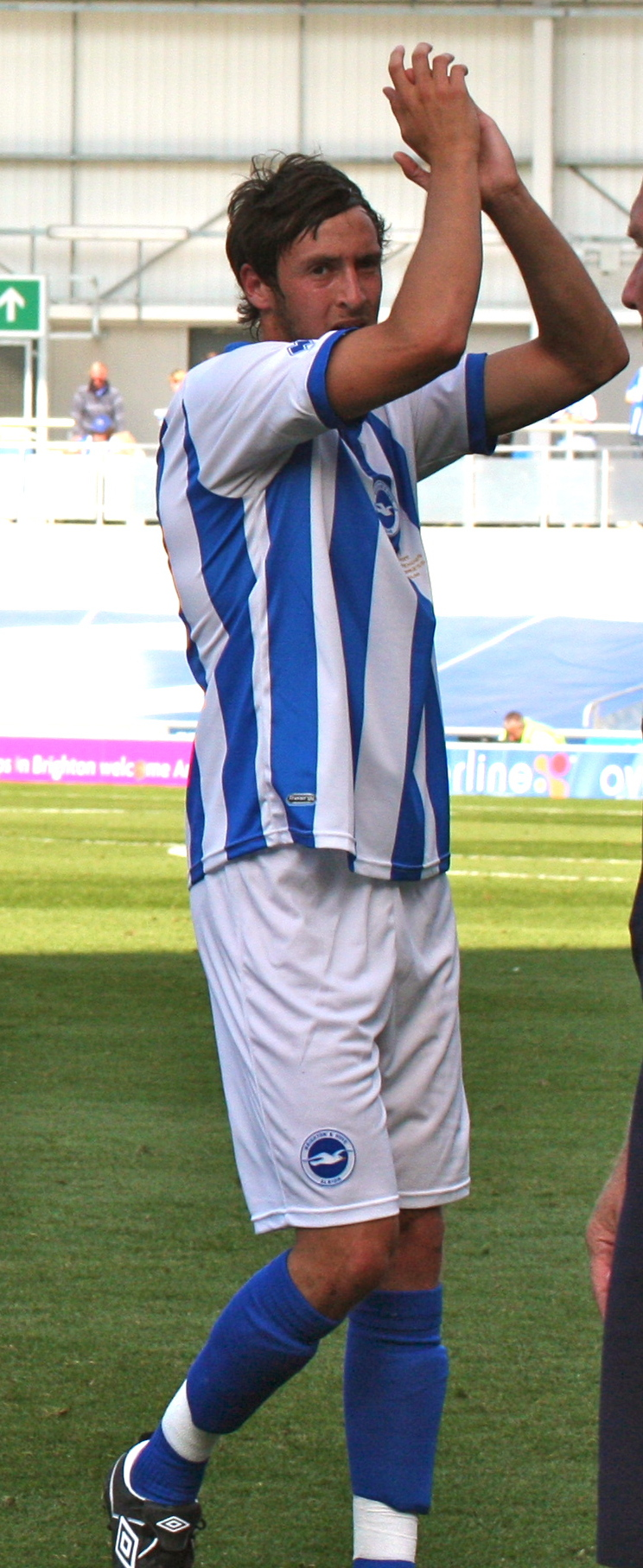
Buckley with Brighton in 2011.

Buckley scored his first and second league goals for Brighton in a dramatic 2–1 victory against Doncaster Rovers. His second goal came 8 minutes into second-half stoppage time and earned Brighton their first win at their new stadium at Falmer. In his first start for Brighton, in the League Cup, he earned a penalty in a 1–0 victory against Gillingham. However, at the start of the season, Buckley struggled with injuries.

It wasn't until 3 December 2011, that Buckley again came off the bench to score an injury-time winner – a 92nd-minute goal in a 1–0 victory over Nottingham Forest. His fourth goal of the season, in a 2–0 win over Bristol City on 14 January 2012, was his first Brighton goal not scored after coming on as a substitute. In the next league game, Buckley found the net twice more to win away at Peterborough United – his second coming in the 88th minute. Against Newcastle United in the FA Cup fifth round, Buckley's shot was deflected to cause the own-goal that gave Brighton a shock 1–0 win. His performance throughout saw him being nominated for January's Player of the Month, but lost out to Birmingham City's defender Curtis Davies. On 4 February, his scoring run continued with another late winner, a 90th-minute goal at home to Leicester City, and in April, the eighth goal of Buckley's Brighton career came against former club Watford, with a late equaliser to make the score 2–2.

In his first season at Brighton & Hove Albion, Buckley made thirty-five appearances and scoring eight times in all competitions.

==== 2012–13 season ====
At the start of the 2012–13 season, Buckley missed out for rest of August when he suffered a hamstring injury in a friendly match. After returning to the first team against Burnley, Buckley scored his first goal of the 2012–13 campaign in a 3–0 victory over Sheffield Wednesday. Now established as a first-team starter, he scored further goals against Ipswich Town (another late equaliser), Wolverhampton Wanderers in a 3–3 draw, and a brace at Huddersfield Town which secured a 2–1 Brighton win.

His performance attracted interests from clubs, but Manager Gus Poyet warned the club, stating he is not for sale. Nevertheless, on 4 January 2013, Buckley signed a four-and-a-half-year contract with Brighton, to expire in 2017. However, as the 2012–13 season, Buckley was absent from the first team on four occasions despite appearing regularly in the first team, due to injuries. Despite this, Buckley continued to play a vital role for the club this season. In a match against Crystal Palace on 17 March 2013, Buckley set up two goals, in a 3–0 win, followed up by scoring in a 2–2 draw against Nottingham Forest on 30 March 2013. Buckley then scored two goals in two matches on 20 April 2013 and 27 April 2013 against Blackpool and Leeds United.

At the end of the 2012–13 season, Buckley went on to make thirty-nine appearances and scoring eight times in all competitions.

==== Last two seasons at Brighton & Hove Albion ====
In the 2013–14 season, Buckley continued to be in the first team regular at the club and played as an orthodox wide man under the new management of Óscar García.

It took until September 2013 for Buckley to score. In form, he also set up one of the goals, in a 2–1 win over Bolton Wanderers. However, between November and February, Buckley was absent from the first team, due to injuries and played four times between that month. Following his return, Buckley regained his first team and scored twice on 15 March 2014, in a 2–0 win over Bolton Wanderers. Despite suffering another injury, Buckley finished the 2013–14 season, making thirty-four appearances and scoring three times in all competitions.

Ahead of the 2014–15 season, Buckley was linked a move away from the club, as Premier League clubs were keen on signing him. Eventually, on 13 August 2014, Brighton accepted a £2.5 million bid from Sunderland and the agreement was reached. By the time he left the club, Buckley made one appearance in the 2014–15 season, which came against Sheffield Wednesday on 9 August 2014 and saw Brighton lose 1–0 in the opening game of the season.

=== Sunderland ===
On 14 August 2014, Buckley transferred to Premier League club Sunderland for an undisclosed fee, reported as £2.5 million, signing a three-year contract. There, Buckley re-joined Manager Gus Poyet at Sunderland this time and revealed that he tried to sign earlier this year.

Buckley made his Sunderland debut, in the opening game of the season, where he came on as a second-half substitute, in a 2–2 draw against West Bromwich Albion. In the next match against Manchester United, Buckley made his first start and played well, in a 1–1 draw, with the Daily Mirror describing his performance as "provided a consistent attacking threat down the right". Following this, Buckley began to established himself in the first team under Gus Poyet. Buckley then played a vital role in two separate matches against Crystal Palace and rivals' Newcastle United when he provided two assists to give them wins on 3 November 2014 and 21 December 2014 respectively. However, after Poyet's sacking, Buckley struggled to regain his first team, including a knee injury that kept him sidelined for two months. Although he returned to the first team on the bench for the rest of the season, he once played in the reserve side and scored, as well as, assisting one of the goals, in a 3–2 win over Southampton Under-21 on 5 April 2015. After this, Buckley went on to make 24 appearances in all competitions in his first season.

Buckley was one of seven Sunderland players released after they were relegated from the Premier League in 2017.

=== Loan spells ===
Ahead of the 2015–16 season, Buckley's first team opportunities became limited under the new management of Dick Advocaat. After being linked with a move to Championship clubs, including newly promoted Premier League side Bournemouth, Buckley started training with Championship club Leeds United ahead of a loan move in September 2015. On 2 October, Buckley signed for Leeds United on a 93-day emergency loan. He made his Leeds debut the following day, starting in a 2–0 loss against Birmingham City. After making four appearances, Buckley's first team was restricted to substitute bench and remained there until he was recalled by his parent club in late-November.

Despite being linked a move abroad to AEK Athens, where Poyet was based, it was confirmed on 15 January 2016, Buckley joined Championship club Birmingham City on loan for a month. He made his first appearance the following day, as a very late substitute with Birmingham already 3–0 up away at Derby County, but played a rather greater part in his home debut, against Ipswich Town a week later. Brought into the starting eleven after Jacques Maghoma withdrew through illness, he produced an energetic performance, found himself in the right place to score the opening goal after several attempts had been blocked, and was the victim of a foul for which Jonathan Douglas was sent off just before half-time; Birmingham won 3–0. The loan was extended to the end of the season, which he ended with ten league appearances and the one goal. Following this, Buckley, once again, returned to his parent club.

On 5 August 2016, Buckley joined Championship club Sheffield Wednesday on a season-long loan. Four days later, on 9 August 2016, Buckley made his Sheffield Wednesday debut in the first round of EFL Cup against Cambridge United, where he played 120 minutes, as they lost 2–1. However, with one start and two substitute appearances, Buckley struggled in the first team under the management of Carlos Carvalhal. Despite this, on 3 December 2016, Buckley set up a winning goal against Preston North End when he won a penalty, leading Steven Fletcher converting the penalty successfully. However, during the match against them, Buckley suffered a shoulder injury and was sidelined for months. It wasn't until on 6 February 2017 when he returned from injury in a reserve match against Nottingham Forest Development Squad.

=== Bolton Wanderers ===
On 30 June 2017 Bolton Wanderers confirmed that Buckley had signed for them on a two-year deal. Originally released at the end of his contract, Buckley re-signed for Bolton on 2 September 2019 on a short-term contract until January. His contract was not extended when it expired on 10 January 2020, but, after discussions with Bradford City came to nothing, Buckley re-signed for Bolton, seventeen days after being released, on a contract until the end of the season. In his first game after rejoining Bolton, Buckley suffered a broken leg. The injury ruled him out for the rest of the campaign, and he was one of 14 senior players released at the end of their contracts.

Having been unable to find a new team for the 2020–21 season, Buckley retired and set up an agency, WEB Sports Management.

== International career ==
Buckley is eligible to play for the Republic of Ireland through his grandfather and in 2013, encouraged by his then Brighton teammate Stephen Ward, expressed his desire to declare. However, he was never called up to the national side.

== Personal life ==
Despite growing up in Oldham, Buckley supported Newcastle United and scored against them on 28 January 2012.

== Career statistics ==
Appearances and goals by club, season and competition
Club	Season	League			FA Cup		League Cup		Other		Total	
Club	Season	Division	Apps	Goals	Apps	Goals	Apps	Goals	Apps	Goals	Apps	Goals
Rochdale	2007–08	League Two	7	0	0	0	0	0	1 (Note: Appearances in League Two play-offs)	0	8	0
Rochdale	2008–09	League Two	37	10	3	0	0	0	3 (Note: One appearance in Football League Trophy, two in League Two play-offs)	0	43	10
Rochdale	2009–10	League Two	15	3	1	0	1	0	1 (Note: Appearance in Football League Trophy)	0	18	3
Rochdale	Total		59	13	4	0	1	0	5	0	69	13
Watford	2009–10	Championship	6	1	—		—		—		6	1
Watford	2010–11	Championship	33	4	2	0	2	0	—		37	4
Watford	Total		39	5	2	0	2	0	—		43	5
Brighton & Hove Albion	2011–12	Championship	29	8	4	0	2	0	—		35	8
Brighton & Hove Albion	2012–13	Championship	36	8	1	0	0	0	2 (Note: Appearances in the Championship play-offs)	0	39	8
Brighton & Hove Albion	2013–14	Championship	30	3	1	0	1	0	2	0	34	3
Brighton & Hove Albion	2014–15	Championship	1	0	—		0	0	—		1	0
Brighton & Hove Albion	Total		96	19	6	0	3	0	4	0	109	19
Sunderland	2014–15	Premier League	22	0	1	0	1	0	—		24	0
Sunderland	2015–16	Premier League	0	0	0	0	0	0	—		0	0
Sunderland	Total		22	0	1	0	1	0	—		24	0
Leeds United (loan)	2015–16	Championship	4	0	—		—		—		4	0
Birmingham City (loan)	2015–16	Championship	10	1	—		—		—		10	1
Sheffield Wednesday (loan)	2016–17	Championship	11	0	0	0	1	0	—		12	0
Bolton Wanderers	2017–18	Championship	24	2	0	0	2	0	—		26	2
Bolton Wanderers	2018–19	Championship	33	4	1	0	0	0	—		34	4
Bolton Wanderers	2019–20	League One	5	0	0	0	0	0	1	0	6	0
Bolton Wanderers	Total		62	6	1	0	2	0	1	0	66	6
Career total			303	44	14	0	10	0	10	0	337	44
