= Jonathan D'Laryea =

English footballer (born 1985)

Personal information
- Full name: Jonathan Amar D'Laryea
- Date of birth: 3 September 1985 (age 41)
- Place of birth: Manchester, England
- Position: Midfielder

Youth career
- Manchester City

Senior career*
Years	Team	Apps	(Gls)
2004–2006	Manchester City	0	(0)
2005–2006	→ Mansfield Town (loan)	13	(0)
2006–2009	Mansfield Town	149	(3)
2009	→ Northwich Victoria (loan)	13	(0)
2009–2010	Northwich Victoria	20	(0)
2010–2011	Eastwood Town	22	(2)
2011–2013	Gainsborough Trinity	65	(7)
2013–2015	North Ferriby United	34	(0)
2015–2016	Gainsborough Trinity	32	(2)
2016–2019	AFC Mansfield		
2019–2020	Long Eaton United		
2020–2022	AFC Mansfield		
2022–2024	Newark and Sherwood United		

Managerial career
- 2022–2024: Newark and Sherwood United
- 2026: Hucknall Town
- * Club domestic league appearances and goals

Jonathan Amar D'Laryea (born 3 September 1985) is a former English footballer and manager.

Beginning his career with Manchester City, he went on to make over 90 appearances in the Football League for Mansfield Town between 2005 and 2008. went on to forge a career in Non-league football and has played for Northwich Victoria, Eastwood Town, North Ferriby United, Gainsborough Trinity and Long Eaton United and AFC Mansfield.

== Club career ==
D'Laryea is a graduate of Manchester City's Academy where he signed for the club at aged 9, he made one senior appearance for Manchester City in a League Cup defeat against Arsenal in October 2004. He joined Mansfield Town in October 2005 on an initialone-month loan, which was extended by a further two months. After impressing during the loan spell, D'Laryea joined Mansfield Town for a nominal fee on a two-and-a-half-year contract in January 2006. An ankle injury sustained in the summer of 2007 kept D'Laryea out of the side until November 2007, but by the end of the 2007–08 season, D'Laryea had made over 100 appearances in all competitions for Mansfield. After Mansfield Town were relegated to the Conference National at the end of the 2007–08 season, D'Laryea was released by the club but later signed a new contract after impressing new manager, Billy McEwan.

On 23 November, D'Laryea signed permanently for Northwich Victoria after a successful loan spell. On 18 February 2010, D'Laryea signed for Eastwood Town. D'Laryea signed for Conference North side Gainsborough Trinity in June 2011. Following the completion of the 2012 season Jonathan signed for another year with Trinity. In May 2013 he joined North Ferriby United. After 2 years with North Ferriby, D'Laryea re-joined Gainsborough Trinity for the 2015–16 season. D'Laryea announced following Trinity's 4–1 victory over Bradford Park Avenue on the final game of the season that he would be retiring from football. However, he signed for AFC Mansfield a few weeks later.

Having spent three seasons and amassing over 145 appearances for AFC Mansfield, D'Laryea moved on to Long Eaton United before moving back to AFC on 2 March 2020.

== International career ==
On 27 August, D'Laryea received an England C call up by manager Paul Fairclough along with his Mansfield Town teammate Nathan Arnold.

== Coaching career ==
On 12 November 2022, following the departure of Nathan Arnold, D'Laryea became player/manager of Newark & Sherwood United. but parted ways at the end of January 2024.

On 14 May 2026, D'Laryea was appointed, along with Rudy Funk, as joint manager of Hucknall Town

In October 2026, D'Laryea and Funk were sacked.

== Personal life ==
His twin brother, Nathan, was also a professional footballer. The brothers are of Ghanaian descent. Johnathan and his twin brother also studied high school at Stretford Grammar School
