= Andy Thomas (footballer, born 1982) =

English footballer

Andrew Thomas (born 2 December 1982) is an English former footballer who played as a defender.

Thomas signed for his hometown club, Stockport County, as a teenager and made 12 Football League appearances between 2001 and 2003 before being released. He subsequently played for Witton Albion and Kidsgrove Athletic before joining Leek Town in 2006.

Andrew is a UEFA B Qualified Coach and is currently First Team Coach at Bury AFC
