= Keith Kennedy =

English footballer

Personal information
- Full name: Keith Vernon Kennedy
- Date of birth: 5 March 1952 (age 74)
- Place of birth: Sunderland, England
- Position: Left back

Senior career*
Years	Team	Apps	(Gls)
1970–1972	Newcastle United	1	(0)
1972–1982	Bury	405	(4)
1982–1983	Mansfield Town	34	(0)
- Barrow
- Morecambe
- Netherfield
- Colne Dynamoes
Total		440+	(4+)
- * Club domestic league appearances and goals

Keith Vernon Kennedy (born 5 March 1952) is an English former professional footballer who played as a left back, making over 400 career appearances.

== Career ==
Born in Sunderland, Kennedy played for Newcastle United, Bury, Mansfield Town, Barrow, Morecambe, Netherfield and Colne Dynamoes.

== Personal life ==
His younger brother Alan Kennedy, and his son Tom Kennedy were both footballers.
