= Fraser McLachlan =

English footballer

Personal information
- Full name: Fraser Malcolm McLachlan
- Date of birth: 9 November 1982 (age 43)
- Place of birth: Knutsford, England
- Height: 5 ft 11 in (1.80 m)
- Position: Midfielder

Team information
- Current team: Nantwich Town

Youth career
- ?–2001: Stockport County

Senior career*
Years	Team	Apps	(Gls)
2001–2005	Stockport County	53	(4)
2004	→ Northwich Victoria (loan)	3	(0)
2004–2005	→ Mansfield Town (loan)	5	(0)
2005–2006	Mansfield Town	24	(0)
2006	→ Morecambe (loan)	8	(0)
2006–2010	Morecambe	42	(1)
2010–2012	Colwyn Bay		
2012–	Nantwich Town		
- * Club domestic league appearances and goals as of 15:46, 25 May 2010 (UTC)

Fraser Malcolm McLachlan (born 9 November 1982) is an English former footballer who played as a midfielder.

McLachlan began his career in the Football League at Stockport County having joined through the academy. After a loan spell in the Conference for Northwich Victoria, McLachlan moved to Mansfield Town in 2005, before being signed by Sammy McIlroy for Morecambe in March 2006. McLachlan initially moved on loan, making the deal permanent by signing a two-year contract in summer 2006. He missed most of the 2007–08 season because of a broken leg sustained in a League Cup tie with Preston North End. Due to this injury he was released by Morecambe at the end of his contract in May 2010.

He joined Colwyn Bay for the 2010/11 season. In July 2012 he moved to Nantwich Town.

During the end of his football career McLachlan trained as a chartered accountant.
