= John Hardiker =

English footballer

Personal information
- Full name: John David Hardiker
- Date of birth: 7 July 1982 (age 44)
- Place of birth: Preston, England
- Position: Defender

Youth career
- Morecambe

Senior career*
Years	Team	Apps	(Gls)
1999–2002	Morecambe	86	(0)
2002–2005	Stockport County	103	(3)
2005–2006	Bury	11	(0)
2005	→ Morecambe (loan)	9	(0)
2006	Morecambe	8	(0)
2006	Fleetwood Town	0	(0)
2006–2009	Forest Green Rovers	68	(5)
2009–2010	Stalybridge Celtic	40	(3)
2010–2012	Droylsden		
2012	Radcliffe Borough	0	(0)
2012	Northwich Victoria		
2012–2013	Warrington Town	0	(0)
2013	Connah's Quay Nomads		
2013–2014	Ashton United		
2014–2015	Lancaster City		
2016	Kingdom Athletic		
2018	Newburgh Juniors		
- * Club domestic league appearances and goals as of 12:39, 25 August 2013 (UTC)

John David Hardiker (born 7 July 1982) is an English former professional footballer.

Hardiker was a product of the academy system at Morecambe where he made his first full appearance at the age of 16. He moved in 2002 for a fee of £150,000 to Stockport County where he famously scored two goals in a historic victory over Manchester City. After making over 100 appearances for Stockport he moved to Bury before returning to Morecambe.

Hardiker was then released by Morecambe and spent some time at Fleetwood Town before being snapped up by Jim Harvey by signing a contract at Forest Green Rovers.

He had a turbulent 2008–09 season with Forest Green. He was appointed club captain until being sidelined for 4 months with injury, after which he made a dramatic return scoring twice in a 3–0 win over Northwich. Shortly after this, in late February 2009 he was suspended by the club over a non-club related matter. In March 2009 Hardiker resigned from his contract with Forest Green following his suspension.

On 19 March 2009 it was announced that Hardiker has signed a contract with Conference North side Stalybridge Celtic. In late 2010 he joined Droylsden after the two teams agreed an undisclosed fee.

In January 2012, Hardiker left Droylsden and signed for Radcliffe Borough.

In May 2012 he signed for Northwich Victoria. He left Northwich in December 2012 however and he joined Warrington Town. Because of postponements over the 2012 festive period, Hardiker failed to make a single appearance for Warrington and left the club to sign for Connah's Quay Nomads in January 2013. He left the Welsh club at the end of the season and in August 2013 joined Ashton United. After a season at Ashton, he moved to Lancaster City in June 2014.

In October 2018 he signed for Scottish Junior football club Newburgh Juniors.
