= Raphale Evans =

English footballer

Personal information
- Full name: Raphale Mondale Evans
- Date of birth: 7 May 1990 (age 36)
- Place of birth: Manchester, England
- Height: 6 ft 0 in (1.83 m)
- Position: Defender

Youth career
- 2006–2008: Rochdale

Senior career*
Years	Team	Apps	(Gls)
2008–2009	Rochdale	1	(0)
2008	→ Bradford Park Avenue (loan)	4	(0)
2009	→ Leigh Genesis (loan)	1	(0)
2011	Northwich Victoria	5	(0)
2011–2012	Salford City		
2012	Woodley Sports		
2012–2013	Stockport Sports		
2013–	New Mills		
- * Club domestic league appearances and goals as of 12:42, 23 November 2009 (UTC)

Raphale Mondale Evans (born 7 May 1990) is an English footballer. He previously played in the Football League for Rochdale. Evans has also played non-League football for Bradford Park Avenue, Leigh Genesis, Northwich Victoria, Salford City and most recently for Woodley Sports.

In 2009, he was jailed for violent disorder which effectively ended his playing career.

== Life and career ==
Evans was born in Manchester. Described as "physically robust and commanding in the air", he began his football career in Rochdale's youth system. After captaining the youth team and playing for the reserves, he made his first-team debut at the end of the 2007–08 season, playing the whole of a 1–1 draw at home to Shrewsbury Town on 3 May 2008. He signed a 12-month professional contract before the 2008–09 season, and in October 2008 joined Bradford Park Avenue on a month's loan to gain experience; he made three starts and one substitute appearance. In March 2009, with limited opportunity for first-team football with Rochdale, he joined Leigh Genesis for a month's loan, but played only once for the club. His contract with Rochdale expired at the end of the season and was not renewed.

In April 2009 Evans and four other men were remanded in custody charged with murder and attempted murder in connection with the fatal stabbing of a Manchester nightclub doorman. The accused men all denied the charges. Evans pleaded guilty to the lesser charge of violent disorder and was sentenced to 18 months imprisonment in October.

Evans resumed his football career in January 2011 with Northern Premier League Premier Division club Northwich Victoria, initially on non-contract terms. He signed a new contract with the club for the 2011–12 season. In October 2011 he joined Salford City, and in February 2012 he moved to Woodley Sports.

Evans signed a new full-time contract with Woodley Sports, renamed to Stockport Sports in July 2012.
