= Lee Thorpe =

English footballer

Personal information
- Full name: Lee Anthony Thorpe
- Date of birth: 14 December 1975 (age 50)
- Place of birth: Wolverhampton, England
- Height: 6 ft 0 in (1.83 m)
- Position: Forward

Team information
- Current team: Blackpool (Youth Development Phase Lead Coach)

Youth career
- –1994: Blackpool

Senior career*
Years	Team	Apps	(Gls)
1994–1997	Blackpool	12	(0)
1995	→ Bangor City (loan)	3	(1)
1997–2002	Lincoln City	192	(57)
2002–2004	Leyton Orient	55	(12)
2004	→ Grimsby Town (loan)	6	(0)
2004–2005	Bristol Rovers	35	(4)
2005–2006	Swansea City	18	(3)
2005	→ Peterborough United (loan)	6	(0)
2006	→ Torquay United (loan)	10	(3)
2006–2007	Torquay United	41	(8)
2007–2008	Brentford	19	(4)
2008–2009	Rochdale	32	(6)
2009–2010	Darlington	8	(0)
2010–2011	Fleetwood Town	28	(3)
2011	AFC Fylde		
Total		478	(105)
- * Club domestic league appearances and goals

Lee Anthony Thorpe (born 14 December 1975) is an English former professional footballer and youth development coach for Blackpool.

As a player he was a forward from 1994 to 2011. He made over 400 appearances, in a career spanning 18 years, in the Football League with Blackpool, Lincoln City, Leyton Orient, Grimsby Town, Bristol Rovers, Swansea City, Peterborough United, Torquay United, Rochdale and Darlington. Whilst with Blackpool, he also had a loan spell with Welsh club Bangor City, and finished his career in non-league football with Fleetwood Town and AFC Fylde.

== Playing career ==
Thorpe was born in Wolverhampton and began his career as a trainee with Blackpool, turning professional in July 1994. He joined Bangor City on loan in September 1995, scoring once in three games during his spell.

After failing to establish himself at Blackpool, he was allowed to leave, joining Lincoln City on a free transfer in August 1997. He had a successful time at Sincil Bank, scoring 57 times in 192 league games, before moving to Leyton Orient on a free transfer in May 2002. He joined Grimsby Town on loan in February 2004, having been placed on the transfer list and told his contract would not be renewed in the summer. He moved to Bristol Rovers on a free transfer the following month.

In February 2005 he joined Swansea City, initially on loan, but signing on a free transfer a week later. He played a role in their promotion to Football League One. The next season, he was loaned out to Peterborough United in October 2005 and Torquay United in February 2006. He remained at Torquay on loan for the remainder of the season, playing first under John Cornforth and then under Ian Atkins as Torquay successfully fought off relegation to the Conference. On 25 April 2006, Thorpe scored a fantastic overhead kick in a 4–0 win over Stockport County; in November 2012 it was named as Torquay's best goal of all time by FourFourTwo readers.

He signed for Torquay United on a free transfer in May 2006, one of Ian Atkins' first signings after confirming himself as manager for the following season. Although he has played most of his career as a centre-forward, Thorpe also played as a central defender when required at Torquay. He was still under contract when Torquay were relegated to the Conference National, but left by mutual consent on 28 June 2007. He signed a two-year contract with Brentford on 3 July. He was sent off after 45 minutes of his debut for Brentford for a serious foul.

After losing his place in the Brentford first XI under new manager Andy Scott, Thorpe joined Rochdale on a free transfer on 31 January 2008. He scored his first goal for his new club against his former club in a 2–0 win at Griffin Park.

He joined Darlington in 2009 and was released in March 2010, joining Fleetwood Town completing a move back to the Fylde coast where he began his career at Blackpool. He scored the winning goal in Town's 2–1 win over Alfreton Town in the 2010 Conference North play-off final.

Thorpe was one of a number of out-of-contract players released at the end of the 2010–11 season. In July 2011 he agreed to join Northern Premier League First Division North club AFC Fylde, signing a one-year contract. He was released by Fylde in December 2011, having been left out of more recent matchday squads due to budget issues as he was "one of the bigger earners" at the club. In total, Thorpe had made 13 appearances for the club, scoring 7 goals.

== Coaching career ==
After his release by Fylde, Thorpe stated that he was planning to retire from playing football to focus on coaching. He later became a personal trainer and joined Tranmere Rovers as a scout.

He is currently the Lead Youth Development Phase Coach at former club, Blackpool.

== Honours ==
=== As a player ===
Blackpool

- Lancashire Senior Cup: 1994–95, 1995–96

Lincoln City

- Lincolnshire Senior Cup: 1997–98

Grimsby Town

- Lincolnshire Senior Cup runner-up: 2003–04

Swansea City

- FAW Premier Cup: 2004–05, 2005–06
- Football League Trophy: 2005–06

Fleetwood Town

- Conference North play-off winner: 2009–10
