= Tom Kennedy (English footballer) =

English footballer (born 1985)

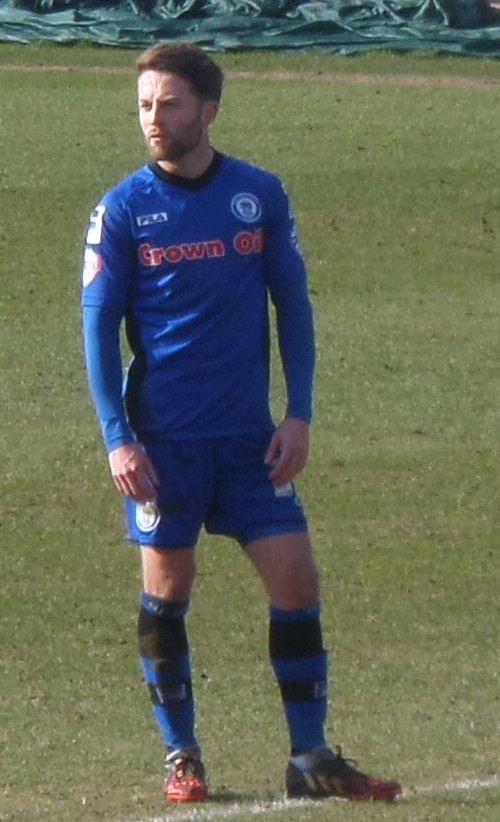

Personal information
- Full name: Thomas Gordon Kennedy
- Date of birth: 24 June 1985 (age 41)
- Place of birth: Bury, England
- Position: Defender

Senior career*
Years	Team	Apps	(Gls)
2002–2007	Bury	143	(5)
2007–2010	Rochdale	137	(9)
2010–2012	Leicester City	6	(0)
2010–2011	→ Rochdale (loan)	6	(0)
2011	→ Peterborough United (loan)	14	(0)
2011	→ Peterborough United (loan)	10	(0)
2012–2014	Barnsley	68	(1)
2014–2016	Rochdale	41	(0)
2014	→ Bury (loan)	2	(0)
2014–2015	→ Blackpool (loan)	5	(0)
2016–2017	AFC Fylde	38	(0)
2017–2018	Bangor City	27	(0)
2018–2022	Ramsbottom United	157	
- * Club domestic league appearances and goals

Thomas Gordon Kennedy (born 24 June 1985) is an English former professional footballer who played as a left-back. He played semi-professionally for Ramsbottom United where he was club captain, before announcing retirement on 8 April 2022.

== Club career ==
Kennedy was born in Bury, England and grew up supporting his local team Bury. His father, Keith Kennedy, played for Bury while his uncle, Alan Kennedy was a defender for Newcastle United and Liverpool.

As he started playing football, Kennedy revealed he started out playing as a central midfielder before moving to different positions, leading him to play as a left-back.

=== Bury ===
Kennedy began his career at Bury and after progressing through the youth ranks, Kennedy signed a contract with the club in February 2003, keeping him until August 2004.

His impressive performance in the reserves earned him a first team place in the 2003–04 season after being called–up to the pre–season tour with Bury. Following this, Kennedy then made his debut as a 54th-minute substitute in Bury's 5–3 defeat away at Mansfield Town on 16 September 2003. His first start for Bury came in their 2–1 win over Oldham Athletic in the Football League Trophy on 3 November 2003. His performance in the first team earned him Bury FC player-of-the-month for December. With 21 appearances in the first team, Kennedy signed a two-year contract with Bury. Kennedy then became Bury's first choice left back, starting all but one of Bury's remaining fixtures in the 2003–04 season, finish the season with 27 league appearances in his first full season at the club. At the end of the 2003–04 season, Kennedy was awarded the Young Player of the Year award.

Despite being linked a move away from Bury during and after the 2003–04 season, Kennedy stayed at the club for the 2004–05 season and was given a number three shirt. After being told by the club's management that he would fight for the first team place, Kennedy managed to regain his first team place in the 2004–05 season and though he played in the left–back position, he once played in the defensive midfield position. Kennedy then scored his first goal, in a 2–2 draw away at Boston United on 12 February 2005. Despite the club's financial situation, Kennedy stayed and started all Bury's 46 games of the 2004–05 season scoring once. He made a total of 50 appearances, including making 46 league appearances, for Bury in all competitions throughout the season.

In the 2005–06 season, Kennedy continued to remain in the first team place and then scored his first goal of the season on 24 September 2005 in a 2–1 away defeat at Oxford United after coming on as a 59th-minute substitute. Kennedy then scored in a 3–2 loss at home to Notts County on 29 October 2005, followed up by scoring a week later on 5 November 2005, in a 2–2 home draw with Scunthorpe United in the first round of the FA Cup. However, between December 2005 and March 2006, Kennedy spent the months sidelined when he suffered hamstring injuries on three occasions. After returning to the first team from injury against Grimsby Town on 18 March 2006, coming on as a second-half substitute, Kennedy scored his first goals in four months, in Bury's 1–1 draw at home with Oxford United on 21 March 2006. On 8 April 2006, Kennedy later scored his fourth goal of the season, in a 3–1 loss at home to Peterborough United. In the 2005–06 season, Kennedy finished the season, making 35 appearances and scoring five times in all competitions. At the end of the 2005–06 season, Kennedy signed a one-year contract extension, keeping him until 2007.

In the 2006–07 season, Kennedy continued to be in the first team regular at Bury and then set up two goals, in a 2–2 draw against Accrington Stanley on 26 September 2006. Kennedy made his last appearances for The Shakers in their 1–0 home loss to Notts County on 24 March 2007. However, as the 2006–07 season progressed, Kennedy went on to make thirty–nine appearances and was released by the club at the end of the 2006–07 season, which he seek new challenges.

Kennedy left Bury in 2007 to join local rivals Rochdale after making 158 appearances for his home town club scoring six times between 2003 when he made his debut for the club until 2007. Additionally, Kennedy was able to surpass his father's goal tally while playing for Bury, a prediction he made two years ago.

=== Rochdale ===
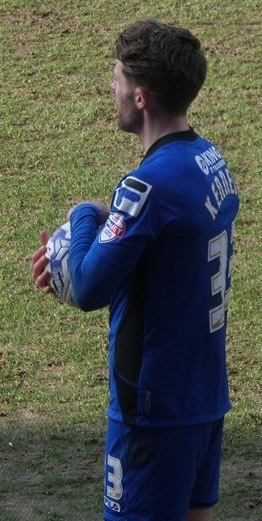
Kennedy playing for Rochdale in March 2015.

Kennedy signed for Rochdale on 4 June 2007 after four seasons at Bury.

Kennedy made his debut, in the opening game of the season on 11 August 2007, in a 3–0 loss against Peterborough United. Since making his Rochdale debut, Kennedy quickly became a first team regular, playing in the left–back position. After suffering an illness that saw him miss one match in late–December, Kennedy returned from injury and set up one of the goals, in a 3–1 win over Darlington on 1 January 2008, followed up by scoring his first goal for the club, in a 1–0 win over Wycombe Wanderers on 11 January 2008. He scored his second goal of the season on 29 January 2008, in a 4–0 win over Chester. In the play-offs against Darlington, Kennedy scored the second penalty in a penalty shoot-out and Rochdale would win the game to go to the final to face Stockport County, after Jason Kennedy miss the final spot kick. After the match, Kennedy reflected the 2007–08 season, stating that the club have had an 'amazing' season and described this an unbelievable feeling. However, Rochdale would succumb 3–2 to Stockport County, remaining in League Two for the following season. Despite this, he went on to finish his first season, making 46 appearances (43 in the league) and scoring two times in all competitions.

In the 2008–09 season, Kennedy started the season well when he helped the side go to their winning ways following the play–offs defeat to Stockport County and scored a winning goal from a free kick in stoppage time, in a 2–1 win over Chesterfield on 20 September 2008. It wasn't until on 23 January 2009 when he scored his second goal of the season, in a 3–2 loss against Dagenham & Redbridge. A week later, Kennedy signed a contract extension, keeping him until the end of the 2009–10 season. Following this, he scored two more goals later in the season against Macclesfield Town and Brentford. Since the start of the season, Kennedy featured in every league game until he missed out on the last game of the season, due to resting ahead of the play–offs. However, once again, Rochdale lost 2–1 on aggregate to Gillingham. Despite this, Kennedy was voted into the PFA League Two Team of The Year, voted for by his fellow professionals in League Two, for the 2008–09 season at the PFA awards. He was also voted Defender of the Year for the 2008–09 season following Rochdale's unsuccessful promotion push.

In the 2009–10 season, Kennedy started the season well when he scored the only goal in the game from a penalty, in a 1–0 win over Aldershot Town on 15 August 2009. He later scored two more goals by the end of the 2009 against Bury and Barnet. His performance throughout the 2009–10 season led Manager Keith Hill commented in March 2010 that Kennedy is considered as the best left-back in League Two. After helping the club finish third place that saw them promoted to League One, Kennedy finished the 2009–10 season, making 47 (44 in the league) appearances and scoring three times in all competitions. Once again, Kennedy was voted into the PFA League Two Team of The Year for the 2009–10 season at the PFA awards.

At the end of the season, Kennedy was offered a new contract by the club, as his contract set to expires in July. However, he announced his intention to leave Rochdale, with clubs in Championship like Doncaster Rovers, Leeds United, Scunthorpe United all tracking to sign Kennedy.

=== Leicester City ===
On 10 June 2010, the Championship side Leicester City agreed a pre-contract with Kennedy and the left back officially joined Leicester on 1 July, having rejected a chance to move Doncaster Rovers. After moving, Kennedy say he made an easy decision to join Leicester City.

Kennedy made his Leicester City debut in the first round of the League Cup, starting the whole game, in a 4–3 win over Macclesfield Town. It wasn't until on 28 September 2010 when he made his league debut for the club away, in a 4–3 loss against Norwich City, playing the whole game. During the match, he was conceded a penalty when he was penalised for handball. After the match, Kennedy acknowledged the fault of giving away the penalty, but hopes for first team football in the near future. Despite stating that he adapted to the team, his time at Leicester City was unhappy over lack of first team opportunities at Leicester City as he spent time on the bench more often, as well as, becoming the third choice player in the left–back position behind Bruno Berner and Greg Cunningham. In his first season at Leicester City, Kennedy went on to make four appearances in all competitions.

Ahead of the 2011–12 season, Kennedy stated that he had no future at Leicester City. After returning from a loan spell at Peterborough United, Kennedy returned to Leicester City and was put straight into the starting line-up against Crystal Palace to finally make his senior debut for the club under Nigel Pearson, 19 months after signing him. Though he made seven more appearances in all competitions later in the season, his first team opportunities continued to be limited, as he spent the rest of the season on the substitute bench. As a result, it was announced that Kennedy and the club came to a mutual agreement to terminate his contract on 29 August 2012.

==== Loan moves ====
On 1 November 2010, Kennedy re-joined his old club Rochdale on loan until January due to lack of first team opportunities at Leicester City. Kennedy's first match since leaving the club in the summer came on 13 November 2010, starting the whole, in a 2–0 loss against Sheffield Wednesday. In the next game against Swindon Town on 20 November 2010, Kennedy set up one of the goals, in a 3–3 draw. After making six appearances at Rochdale, Kennedy loan spell at Rochdale had ended in January 2011.

On 20 January 2011, Kennedy joined League One club Peterborough United on loan until the end of the season, which could be made permanent. The next day, on 21 January 2011, Kennedy made his debut, playing 90 minutes, in a 4–0 win over Hartlepool United. Kennedy have since established himself in the starting eleven, playing in the left back position in defence. Having made 14 starts since joining the club, Kennedy said he expressed desire to stay at Peterborough United permanent at the end of the season. But, nothing came for it as in April, Kennedy suffered a knee ligament damage during a 2–0 win over Dagenham & Redbridge, resulted his last appearance for Peterborough and would return to Leicester City for treatment. At the end of the season with Peterborough promoted to the Championship, director of football Barry Fry expressed desire to sign Kennedy but feared his injury prevent his move back to the club

On 30 September 2011, Kennedy re-joined Peterborough for a second loan spell on a 3-month loan from Leicester. However, Kennedy's first month at re–joining the club suffered a setback, as he became a second choice left–back player behind Craig Alcock. It wasn't until on 30 October 2011 when Kennedy made his second debut for the club, playing the whole game, in a 3–2 loss against Watford. After making ten appearances for the side in his second loan spell, Kennedy's second loan at Peterborough ended in January 2012.

=== Barnsley ===
After leaving Leicester City, Kennedy agreed non-contract terms with Barnsley until January 2013 on 21 September 2012 after a period training with the South Yorkshire club.

Kennedy made his debut on 22 September in a 5–0 win against Birmingham City. However Kennedy initially struggled for first team opportunities, making just a handful of first team appearances; but since early January became a first team regular for the rest of the season. As a result, Kennedy signed a six-month contract as his non-contract agreement was about to expire. In a 6–0 loss against Charlton Athletic on 13 April 2013, he received a straight red card when he "brought down Ricardo Fuller" and was the second Barnsley to be sent–off in the game, as well as Stephen Dawson. He served a one–match suspension and returned to the first team, where he played three remaining matches later in the season, including the last game of the season, playing the whole game, in a 2–2 draw against Huddersfield Town, a draw that saw Barnsley secure Championship status for another season. At the end of the 2012–13 season, Kennedy went on to make 24 appearances in all competitions and for his performance, Kennedy signed a two-year extension in the summer of 2013.

In the 2013–14 season, Kennedy switched number shirt from 33 to 4 this season and continued to be a first team regular for the side since the start of the season. In a 2–1 win over Huddersfield Town on 31 August 2013, he set up a goal for Marcus Pedersen to score the second goal for Barnsley in the game. Kennedy also assisted six more times later in the 2013–14 season, including assisting a winning goal, in a 1–0 win over Nottingham Forest on 8 March 2014. Kennedy then scored his first goal for the club on 15 April 2014, scoring a winning goal, in a 2–1 against Charlton Athletic. However, the club was eventually relegated to League One next season after losing 3–1 to Middlesbrough on 26 April 2014. Despite missing out two times, due to being on the substitute bench unused, Kennedy finished his second season at Barnsley, making forty–seven appearances and scoring once in all competitions.

However, ahead of the 2014–15 season, Kennedy terminated his contract at Barnsley on 31 July 2014. It came after when Kennedy, along with Martin Cranie, did not travel to Italy with the squad for the club's pre-season training trip to Italy.

=== Rochdale Return ===
On 14 August 2014, Kennedy resigned for Rochdale on a short-term deal until January 2015. and reuniting with former manager Keith Hill.

Two days after signing for the club, Kennedy's second debut for the club came against Chesterfield, playing the whole game, in a 2–1 loss. Although becoming a first team regular throughout August, Kennedy lost his first team place in the left–back positions and was limited to six appearances by the time he went out on loan throughout January. After returning to his parent club from loan spells, he signed a contract extension with the club, keeping him until the end of the season. It wasn't until on 21 February 2015 when he returned to the first team for the first time since October, playing the whole game, in a 1–0 win over Chesterfield. Since then, Kennedy regained his first team place as a left–back throughout the 2014–15 season, making twenty–four appearances in all competitions and it was announced on 29 June 2015 that Kennedy signed a new two-year deal.

In his second season at Rochdale, Kennedy continued to regain his first team place at the start of the 2015–16 season, but soon around October, he was demoted to the substitute's bench for most of the season, due to competitions. After returning to the first team in January, Kennedy made his 200th appearance in his Rochdale career on 30 January 2016, in a 2–1 win over Burton Albion. However, Kennedy, once again, lost his first team place at Rochdale and didn't play again for the rest of the 2015–16 season. Despite this, he went on to make twenty–one appearances in all competitions.

On 26 May 2016, Kennedy left Rochdale by mutual consent.

==== Loan Spells ====
On 23 October 2014, Kennedy rejoined Bury on loan from Rochdale with a view to a permanent deal. Two days later, Kennedy made his Bury debut, playing the whole game, in a 1–1 draw against Southend United. Just after making four appearances, Kennedy returned to his parent club on 22 November 2014 despite an option to extend until January.

On 22 November 2014, Kennedy joined Championship side Blackpool on loan until 14 January 2015. Later on the same day, he made his Blackpool debut, playing the whole game, in a 1–1 draw against Bolton Wanderers. Kennedy went on to make five appearances for the side, with his last appearance came on 20 December 2014, in a 6–1 heavy defeat to Bournemouth. After this, Kennedy was dropped from the squad and never played again. Eventually, Kennedy left Blackpool to return to his parent club in mid–January.

=== AFC Fylde ===
After being released by Rochdale, Kennedy joined Non–League side AFC Fylde in the summer.

Kennedy made his Fylde debut, playing the whole game, in a 1–0 win over Telford United in the opening game of the season. Kennedy became a first team regular for the side and helped them win the National League North title after beating Boston United on 22 April 2017. At the end of the 2016–17 season, Kennedy was among several players to leave the club.

He now plays for Ramsbottom United.

== Honours ==
Individual

- PFA Team of the Year: 2008–09 Football League Two, 2009–10 Football League Two
