= James Spencer (footballer, born 1985) =

English footballer

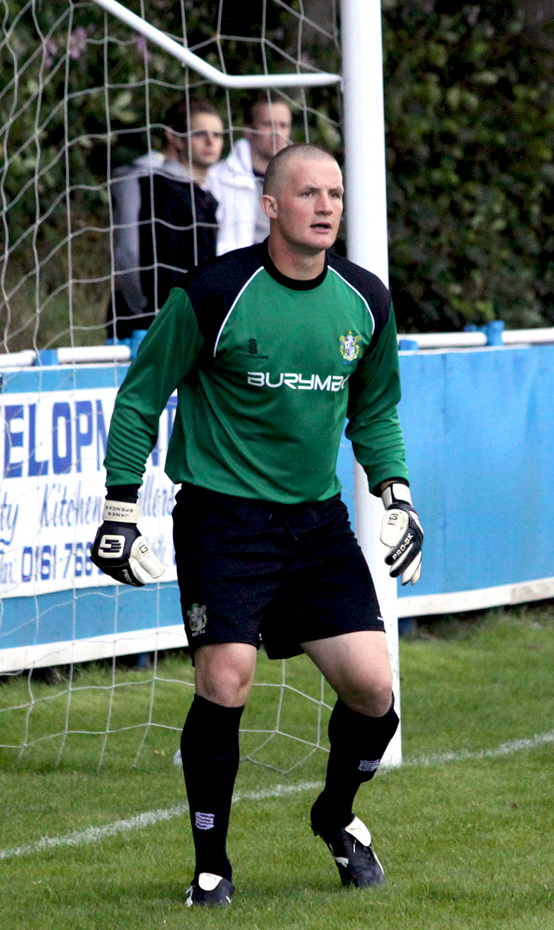
- Spencer on trial with Bury

Personal information
- Full name: James Matthew Spencer
- Date of birth: 11 April 1985 (age 41)
- Place of birth: Stockport, England
- Height: 6 ft 5 in (1.96 m)
- Position: Goalkeeper

Youth career
- Stockport County

Senior career*
| Years | Team | Apps | (Gls) |
| 2001–2007 | Stockport County | 91 | (0) |
| 2007–2009 | Rochdale | 20 | (0) |
| 2009 | → Chester City (loan) | 5 | (0) |
| 2009–2011 | Northwich Victoria | 66 | (0) |
| 2011–? | FC United of Manchester | 53 | (0) |
- * Club domestic league appearances and goals as of 20:12, 9 November 2012 (UTC)

James Matthew Spencer (born 11 April 1985) is an English footballer who plays as a goalkeeper.

== Playing career ==
=== Stockport County ===
Born in Stockport, Greater Manchester, Spencer started his senior career with his local side Stockport County, where he came through the club's Centre of Excellence youth system, making his debut in a 2–1 victory over Watford in 2002, aged just 16. Since his debut in 2002, Spencer played regularly for the Stockport first team, linking him with moves to Sunderland and West Bromwich Albion. However, Spencer lacked first-team opportunities during the 2006–07 season.

=== Rochdale ===
In the summer of 2007 he signed a two-year contract with Rochdale, however he lacked first team opportunities when a double hernia and stress fracture of the hip in April 2008 kept him out due to injury he was replaced by Sam Russell and subsequently Rochdale brought Premiership keeper Frank Fielding in on a loan deal. On 9 April 2009, Spencer joined Chester City on an emergency loan, following an injury to regular goalkeeper John Danby. He played in the final five matches of the season but was unable to prevent City being relegated out of The Football League. At the end of the season, Spencer was released by Rochdale,

=== Non-League ===
After his release from Rochdale, he joined non-league side Northwich Victoria in August 2009, but after two successful seasons with the club, he was released in 2011, to cut the playing budget.

He was then signed by FC United of Manchester in July 2011.
