= Nathan D'Laryea =

English footballer

Personal information
- Full name: Nathan Amarkine D'Laryea
- Date of birth: 3 September 1985 (age 41)
- Place of birth: Manchester, England
- Height: 5 ft 10 in (1.78 m)
- Positions: Defender; midfielder

Youth career
- 2004–2006: Manchester City

Senior career*
Years	Team	Apps	(Gls)
2006–2007	Manchester City	0	(0)
2007	→ Macclesfield Town (loan)	1	(0)
2007–2009	Rochdale	8	(0)
2009–2010	Hyde United	33	(1)
Total		42	(1)
- * Club domestic league appearances and goals

Nathan Amarkine D'Laryea (born 3 September 1985) is an English former footballer who played as a defender. He was a product of the Manchester City academy and played for clubs including Rochdale, Macclesfield Town and Hyde United.

== Career ==
=== Early career ===
D'Laryea started out as a trainee at Manchester City. Before being released by City, he had a spell on loan at Macclesfield Town during the 2006–07 season. He joined Rochdale but made only eight appearances in two seasons and he quit professional football to study for a degree in English Language at the University of Manchester.

=== Hyde ===
In July 2009 D'Laryea signed for Conference North semi-professional club Hyde United. He made his debut for Hyde in the first game of the 2009–2010 season against Stafford Rangers. He scored his first Hyde goal in March 2010 in the Tameside derby against Stalybridge Celtic. He became a regular for Hyde at centre back until late in his first season when he acquired an injury that kept him out for the remainder of the season and the start of 2010–11 season.

== Personal life ==
His twin brother, Jonathan D'Laryea, is also an ex- professional footballer and currently manages Hucknall Town F.C.. The D'Laryea brothers are of Ghanaian descent.

In 2012 D'Laryea was working as a secondary school teacher at Dixons Allerton Academy in Bradford and where he taught maths. He later moved to Manchester and worked at Loreto High School, Chorlton.

== Referee ==
In April 2011, it was announced that he had commenced a post-playing career as referee for Leisure Leagues 6-a-side football in Oldham.
