= Michael Liddle =

English footballer (born 1989)

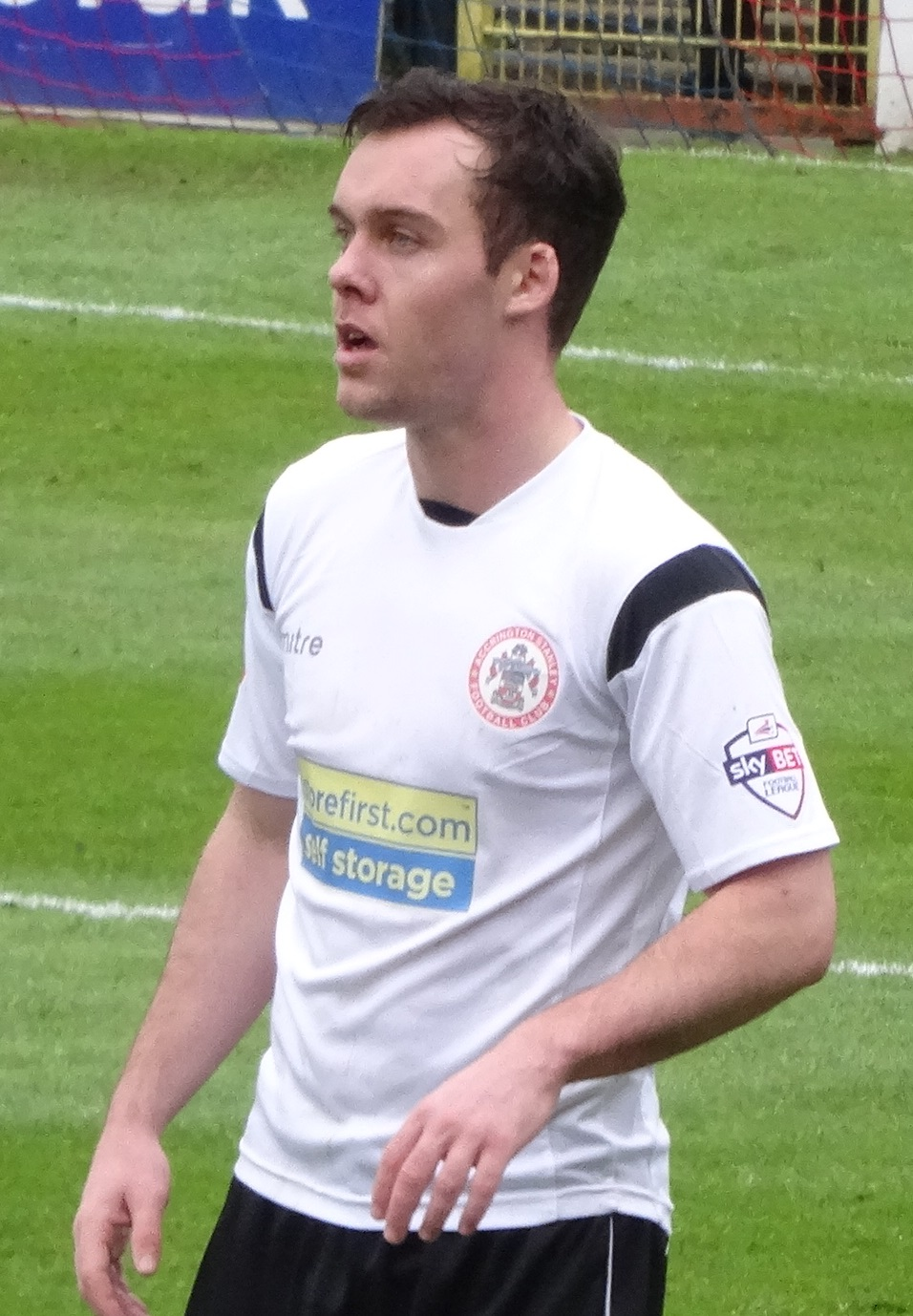
- Liddle playing for Accrington Stanley in 2014

Personal information
- Full name: Michael William Liddle
- Date of birth: 25 December 1989 (age 36)
- Place of birth: Hounslow, England
- Height: 1.73 m (5 ft 8 in)
- Position: Defender

Youth career
- 2006–2008: Sunderland

Senior career*
Years	Team	Apps	(Gls)
2008–2012	Sunderland	0	(0)
2008–2009	→ Carlisle United (loan)	22	(0)
2010	→ Leyton Orient (loan)	1	(0)
2011	→ Gateshead (loan)	23	(2)
2012	→ Accrington Stanley (loan)	12	(0)
2012–2015	Accrington Stanley	66	(0)
2016	Dunston UTS	10	(0)
2016–2019	Blyth Spartans		
2019–2021	Darlington	29	(1)
2021–2024	Blyth Spartans	80	(3)
Total		243	(6)

International career
2008–2009	Republic of Ireland U21	5	(0)
- * Club domestic league appearances and goals as of 08:04, 17 May 2024 (UTC)

Michael William Liddle (born 25 December 1989) is a former professional footballer who played as a defender. He began his club career with Sunderland, though appeared only once for the first team, and spent time on loan at Carlisle United, Leyton Orient, Gateshead and Accrington Stanley, before joining the latter club on a permanent basis in 2012. He then moved into non-league football with Dunston UTS, Blyth Spartans and Darlington, before returning to Blyth Spartans in 2021.

He has played for Ireland at under-18, under-19 and under-21 level.

== Club career ==
=== Sunderland ===
Liddle started his footballing career with Haydon Bridge and Sunderland, whom he joined as a youth player. At Sunderland he progressed through the youth side and was given a professional contract ahead of the 2008–09 season. It took until January 2010 for him to make his first-team debut, in a FA Cup third-round match at home to Barrow; he came on as a substitute late in the game which Sunderland won 3–0.

==== Loan spells ====
On 14 November 2008, Liddle joined League One club Carlisle United on two months' loan; he joined up with fellow Sunderland loanee Graham Kavanagh. His debut came the following day, in the starting eleven for Carlisle's 3–1 win against Brighton & Hove Albion. The loan was first extended until 14 February 2009, and then to the end of the season; he went on to make 22 appearances.

Liddle signed a four-month youth loan with another League One club, Leyton Orient, on 5 August 2010, but returned to Sunderland after only a month because of a groin injury. His only appearance was in the starting eleven against Yeovil Town.

On 6 January 2011, Liddle joined Gateshead on a 28-day loan. He made his debut two days later in a 2–2 draw with Kidderminster Harriers, and "curl[ed] a beauty into the far corner with the outside of his boot" for his first senior goal, which was voted Gateshead's goal of the season. His loan was extended to the end of the 2010–11 season, which he finished with 22 Conference Premier appearances.

=== Accrington Stanley ===
Liddle joined League Two club Accrington Stanley on loan for an initial month on 24 February 2012, and made his debut the next day in a 2–0 loss against Swindon Town. He was sent off against Southend United on 10 March, and after he served his suspension, his loan was extended to the end of the season. He made 12 appearances, all in league competition.

He signed a one-year permanent deal with Stanley in July 2012; the fee was undisclosed. He began the season as a regular in the starting eleven until 18 September, when the second sending-off of his Stanley career, just before Chesterfield scored a winning goal, resulted in a three-match ban. He finished the season with 36 appearances in all competitions.

Liddle signed a new one-year contract with the club ahead of the 2013–14 season. He appeared in the first five matches of the season before an ankle injury was to keep him out for two months; he returned to the first team as a late substitute against Wycombe Wanderers. He lost his place to short-term signing Lee Naylor, and the rest of Liddle's season was disrupted by hamstring trouble and competition from Laurence Wilson.

After signing on for a third year, Liddle started the opening game of the season, but a "succession of niggling injuries" were to keep him out for three months. He made his first-team return in the FA Cup first round, a goalless draw with Notts County in which manager John Coleman thought he was the best player. He finished the season with 15 league appearances, more than half as a substitute, and was released when his contract expired.

=== Later career ===
Liddle went on trial at Scottish Championship club Hibernian. However, he suffered a knee injury during a development match and the club offered him support during his recovery period.

After a spell with Northern League club Dunston UTS towards the end of the 2015–16 season, Liddle joined Blyth Spartans of the Northern Premier League in June 2016. He made his debut in the opening game of the season, in a 3–1 win over Coalville Town. He spent three seasons with Spartans and then signed for National League North club Darlington in May 2019. Despite interruptions through injury, Liddle made 29 appearances in the curtailed 2019–20 season. He was a regular in 2020–21 before the National League North was abandoned because of COVID-19 pandemic-related issues, and left the club at the end of that season.

Liddle rejoined Blyth Spartans in May 2021.

On 22 June 2024, Liddle announced his retirement from football.

== International career ==
Liddle was born in England and qualifies to play for Ireland because his mother is Irish. After playing in the under-18s and under-19s for his country, Liddle was called up to the Ireland under-21 squad for a friendly against Austria U21 on 19 August 2008. At that stage he had not made an appearance for his club after being signed on a professional contract in the 2008–09 season. Sunderland manager, Roy Keane, commented that "The young players have done well. It's a real plus for us and I have no doubts that some of them will be able to handle it at the top level". He started against Austria, in a 1–1 draw. Liddle said "The call-up came as a big surprise. I didn't expect it. When I was named in the starting eleven I [sic] buzzing!" He made further appearances against Bulgaria, Portugal, Lithuania and Germany.

== Career statistics ==
As of end of 2023–24 season

Appearances and goals by club, season and competition
Club	Season	League			FA Cup		League Cup		Other		Total	
Club	Season	Division	Apps	Goals	Apps	Goals	Apps	Goals	Apps	Goals	Apps	Goals
Sunderland	2008–09	Premier League	0	0	—		0	0	—		0	0
Sunderland	2009–10	Premier League	0	0	1	0	0	0	—		1	0
Sunderland	2010–11	Premier League	0	0	—		—		—		0	0
Sunderland	2011–12	Premier League	0	0	0	0	0	0	—		0	0
Sunderland	Total		0	0	1	0	0	0	—		1	0
Carlisle United (loan)	2008–09	League One	22	0	1	0	—		—		23	0
Leyton Orient (loan)	2010–11	League One	1	0	—		0	0	0	0	1	0
Gateshead (loan)	2010–11	Conference Premier	23	2 (Note: Figure includes the first goal against Luton Town on 23 January 2011, which Gateshead F.C. attribute to Liddle, though statistics databases give it to another player.)	—		—		5 (Note: Appearance(s) in FA Trophy)	0	28	2
Accrington Stanley (loan)	2011–12	League Two	12	0	—		—		—		12	0
Accrington Stanley	2012–13	League Two	32	0	3	0	1	0	0	0	36	0
Accrington Stanley	2013–14	League Two	19	0	0	0	2	0	1 (Note: Appearance(s) in Football League Trophy)	0	22	0
Accrington Stanley	2014–15	League Two	15	0	4	0	0	0	0	0	19	0
Accrington Stanley	Total		78	0	7	0	3	0	1	0	89	0
Dunston UTS	2015–16	Northern League Div One	10	0	—		—		—		10	0
Blyth Spartans	2016–17	Northern Premier League Premier									39	0
Blyth Spartans	2017–18	National League North	33	2	0	0	—		1	0	34	2
Blyth Spartans	2018–19	National League North	32	1	3	0	—		4	1	39	2
Blyth Spartans	Total		65	3	3	0			5	1	112	4
Darlington	2019–20	National League North	21	1	4	0	—		4	0	29	1
Darlington	2020–21	National League North	8	0	4	1	—		2	0	14	1
Darlington	Total		29	1	8	1	—		6	0	43	2
Blyth Spartans	2021–22	National League North	26	1	3	0	—		1	0	30	1
Blyth Spartans	2022–23	National League North	24	0	3	0	—		0	0	27	0
Blyth Spartans	2023–24	National League North	30	2	4	0	—		2	0	36	2
Blyth Spartans	Total		80	3	10	0	—		3	0	93	3
Career total			308	9	30	1	3	0	20	1	400	11
