= 2013–14 Accrington Stanley F.C. season =

Accrington Stanley
2013–14 season
- Manager: James Beattie
- Stadium: Crown Ground
- League Two: 15th
- FA Cup: First round (knocked out by Tranmere Rovers)
- League Cup: Second round (knocked out by Cardiff City)
- League Trophy: First round (knocked out by Crewe Alexandra)

The 2013–14 season was Accrington Stanley's eighth consecutive season in the Football League and League Two.

== Fixtures & Results ==
=== Pre-season friendlies ===
6 July 2013	Nelson	2–4	Accrington Stanley	Nelson
15:00 BST	Aldred 20' (o.g.); Taylor 54'	Report	Gray 17', 19'; Murphy 63'; Hatfield 67'	Stadium: Victoria Park; Attendance: 301

9 July 2013	A.F.C. Darwen	0–4	Accrington Stanley	Darwen
19:45 BST		Report	McCartan 1'; Gibson 42'; Windass 68'; Savitt 88'	Stadium: The Anchor Ground; Attendance: 1

13 July 2013	Altrincham	2–3	Accrington Stanley	Altrincham
15:00 BST	Densmore 35'; Walshaw 48'	Report	Miller 16'; Naismith 77'; Murphy 88'	Stadium: Moss Lane; Attendance: 387

17 July 2013	Accrington Stanley	1–4	Everton	Accrington
19:45 BST	Murphy 44'	Report	Gibson 11'; Anichebe 16'; Mirallas 42'; Osman 62'	Stadium: Crown Ground; Attendance: 3,642

20 July 2013	Accrington Stanley	1–1	Tranmere Rovers	Accrington
15:00 BST	Naismith 49'	Report	Atkinson 78'	Stadium: Crown Ground; Attendance: 425

23 July 2013	Accrington Stanley	1–1	Oldham Athletic	Accrington
19:30 BST	Clark 12'	Report	Baxter 42'	Stadium: Crown Ground

27 July 2013	Barrow	2–0	Accrington Stanley	Barrow-in-Furness
15:00 BST	Reynolds 47'; Meechan 70'	Report		Stadium: Holker Street; Attendance: 333

30 July 2013	Stalybridge Celtic	2–2	Accrington Stanley	Stalybridge
19:30 BST	Anorou 43'; Platt 87'	Report	Windass 22'; Carver 49'	Stadium: Bower Fold

=== League Two ===
3 August 2013 1	Newport County	4–1	Accrington Stanley	Newport
15:00 BST	Worley 24'; Zebroski 43', 66'; Jolley 55'	Report	Webber 68'	Stadium: Rodney Parade; Attendance: 4,631; Referee: Darren Drysdale

10 August 2013 2	Accrington Stanley	2–2	Portsmouth	Accrington
15:00 BST	Murphy 48', 85'	Report	57', 79' (pen) Connolly	Stadium: Crown Ground; Attendance: 2,531; Referee: David Ilderton

17 August 2013 3	Bury	3–0	Accrington Stanley	Bury
15:00 BST	Forrester 28'; Sinnott 38'; Jackson 87'	Report	(red card) 33' Danny Webber	Stadium: Gigg Lane; Attendance: 3,080; Referee: Bond

24 August 2013 4	Accrington Stanley	0–1	Cheltenham Town	Accrington
15:00 BST		Report	71' Taylor	Stadium: Crown Ground; Attendance: 1,224; Referee: Mathieson

31 August 2013 5	Accrington Stanley	0–1	Burton Albion	Accrington
15:00 BST		Report	90' Reed	Stadium: Crown Ground; Attendance: 1,174; Referee: Jeremy Simpson

7 September 2013 6	Chesterfield	1–0	Accrington Stanley	Chesterfield
15:00 BST	Darikwa 47'	Report		Stadium: Proact Stadium; Attendance: 6,588; Referee: Darren Deadman

14 September 2013 7	Hartlepool United	2–1	Accrington Stanley	Hartlepool
15:00 BST	Franks 30'; Monkhouse 42'	Report	57' Gray	Stadium: Victoria Park; Attendance: 3,388; Referee: Naylor

21 September 2013 8	Accrington Stanley	1–2	Rochdale	Accrington
15:00 BST	Odejayi 24'	Report	7' Lund; 13' Hogan	Stadium: Crown Ground; Attendance: 2,180; Referee: Brown

28 September 2013 9	Plymouth Argyle	0–0	Accrington Stanley	Plymouth
15:00 BST		Report		Stadium: Home Park; Attendance: 6,180; Referee: Bratt

4 October 2013 10	Accrington Stanley	1–2	Dagenham & Redbridge	Accrington
19:45 BST	Gray 90'	Report	56' Hines; 61' Murphy	Stadium: Crown Ground; Attendance: 1,833; Referee: Mike Russell

12 October 2013 11	Wimbledon	1–1	Accrington Stanley	London
15:00 BST	Bennett 86'	Report	17' Odejayi	Stadium: Kingsmeadow; Attendance: 4,585; Referee: Garry Sutton

19 October 2013 12	Accrington Stanley	0–0	Oxford United	Accrington
15:00 BST		Report		Stadium: Crown Ground; Attendance: 1,476; Referee: Carl Boyeson

22 October 2013 13	Accrington Stanley	2–1	Bristol Rovers	Accrington
19:45 BST	Gray 19'; Naismith 29'	Report	5' Henshall	Stadium: Crown Ground; Attendance: 1,101; Referee: Geoff Eltringham

26 October 2013 14	Morecambe	1–2	Accrington Stanley	Morecambe
15:00 BST	Sampson 50'	Report	19' (pen) Webber; 90' Murphy	Stadium: Globe Arena; Attendance: 2,175; Referee: Mark Heywood

2 November 2013 15	Accrington Stanley	1–1	Wycombe Wanderers	Accrington
15:00 BST	Murphy 90'	Report	72' Stewart	Stadium: Crown Ground; Attendance: 1,268; Referee: Chris Sarginson

16 November 2013 16	Scunthorpe United	0–2	Accrington Stanley	Scunthorpe
15:00 BST		Report	26' Bowerman; 36' Odejayi	Stadium: Glanford Park; Attendance: 3,255; Referee: Richard Clark

23 November 2013 17	Accrington Stanley	2–1	Torquay United	Accrington
15:00 GMT	Naismith 42', 74'	Report	14' McCallum	Stadium: Crown Ground; Attendance: 1,279; Referee: Graham Horwood

26 November 2013 18	Accrington Stanley	2–0	Fleetwood Town	Accrington
19:45 GMT	Webber 75' (pen); Odejayi 82'	Report		Stadium: Crown Ground; Attendance: 1,699; Referee: Oliver Langford

30 November 2013 19	Northampton Town	1–0	Accrington Stanley	Northampton
15:00 GMT	Dallas 29'	Report		Stadium: Sixfields Stadium; Attendance: 4,092; Referee: David Phillips

14 December 2013 20	Accrington Stanley	2–3	Exeter City	Accrington
15:00 GMT	Murphy 38'; Naismith 50'	Report	6', 11' Nichols; 24' Gow	Stadium: Crown Ground; Attendance: 1,219; Referee: Eddie Ilderton

21 December 2013 21	Mansfield Town	2–3	Accrington Stanley	Mansfield
15:00 GMT	McCombe 23', 68'	Report	48', 90' Naismith; 90' Gray	Stadium: Field Mill; Attendance: 2,549; Referee: Carl Boyeson

26 December 2013 22	Accrington Stanley	1–1	York City	Accrington
15:00 GMT	Winnard (yellow card) 35'; Hunt (yellow card) 41'; Bowerman 45+2'	Report	Fletcher 35' (pen.)	Stadium: Crown Ground; Attendance: 2,009; Referee: (England) Mark Heywood

29 December 2013 23	Accrington Stanley	1–1	Southend United	Accrington
15:00 GMT	Phillips 63' (o.g.); Aldred (yellow card) 86'	Report	Prosser 78'	Stadium: Crown Ground; Attendance: 1,333; Referee: (England) Andy Haines

1 January 2014 24	Fleetwood Town	3–1	Accrington Stanley	Fleetwood
15:00 GMT	Parkin 6'; Ball 58'; Goodall (yellow card) 77'; Carr 90+6'	Report	Winnard (yellow card) 70'; Liddle (yellow card) 77'; Odejayi 81'	Stadium: Highbury Stadium; Attendance: 2,446; Referee: (England) Graham Salisbury

11 January 2014 25	Accrington Stanley	3–3	Newport County	Accrington
15:00 GMT	Murphy 23', 88'; Naismith 44'	Report	Willmott 11'; Howe (yellow card) 28'; Burge 71'; Pipe (yellow card) 90'; Minshull 90+2'	Stadium: Crown Ground; Attendance: 1,318; Referee: (England) Dean Whitestone

18 January 2014 26	Cheltenham Town	1–2	Accrington Stanley	Cheltenham
15:00 GMT	Cureton 72'	Report	Bowerman 15'; Joyce 43'; Hunt (yellow card) 80'; Murphy (yellow card) 84'; Odejayi (yellow card) 87'; Bettinelli (yellow card) 90+3'	Stadium: Whaddon Road; Attendance: 2,648; Referee: (England) Tim Robinson

28 January 2014 27	Bristol Rovers	0–1	Accrington Stanley	Bristol
19:45 GMT	Parkes (yellow card) 40'	Report	Joyce (yellow card) 42'; Murphy 90+3'	Stadium: Memorial Stadium; Attendance: 6,067; Referee: (England) David Phillips

8 February 2014 28	Wycombe Wanderers	0–0	Accrington Stanley	High Wycombe
15:00 GMT	Styche (yellow card) 21'	Report	Odejayi (yellow card) 31'; Winnard (yellow card) 77'	Stadium: Adams Park; Attendance: 3,073; Referee: (England) Stephen Bratt

14 February 2014 29	Accrington Stanley	2–3	Scunthorpe United	Accrington
19:45 GMT	Moleyneux 18'; Murphy 37'	Report	50' Winnall; 59' Adelakun; 90' Mirfin	Stadium: Crown Ground; Attendance: 1,256; Referee: Steve Martin

18 February 2014 30	Accrington Stanley	0–0	Bury	Accrington
19:45 GMT	Wilson (red card) 32'	Report		Stadium: Crown Ground; Attendance: 2,184; Referee: Kevin Wright

22 February 2014 31	Torquay United	0–1	Accrington Stanley	Torquay
15:00 BST	Cruise (yellow card) 40'; Labadie (yellow card) 72'	Report	Hunt (yellow card) 49'; Joyce (yellow card) 74'; Naismith 80'	Stadium: Plainmoor; Attendance: 2,218; Referee: (England) Simon Hooper

25 February 2014 32	Portsmouth	1–0	Accrington Stanley	Portsmouth
19:45 GMT	Padovani (yellow card) 30'; Jervis (yellow card) 45+1' (goal) 48'	Report	(yellow card) 69' Joyce	Stadium: Fratton Park; Attendance: 13,387; Referee: Chris Sarginson

1 March 2014 33	Burton Albion	2–1	Accrington Stanley	Burton upon Trent
15:00 GMT	Kee 34', 80' (pen.)	Report	Winnard 69'	Stadium: Pirelli Stadium; Attendance: 2,368; Referee: Andy Haines

8 March 2014 34	Accrington Stanley	3–1	Chesterfield	Accrington
15:00 GMT	Molyneux 4', 9', 45+7'; Murphy (yellow card) 25' (yellow-red card); Hatfield (yellow card) 48'; Joyce (yellow card) 62'	Report	Evatt 85'	Stadium: Crown Ground; Attendance: 1,968; Referee: Scott Mathieson

11 March 2014 35	Accrington Stanley	0–0	Hartlepool United	Accrington
19:45 GMT		Report		Stadium: Crown Ground; Attendance: 1,196; Referee: David Coote

15 March 2014 36	Rochdale	2–1	Accrington Stanley	Rochdale
15:00 GMT	Lund 77', 90+2'; Vincenti (yellow card) 90+7'	Report	Murphy (yellow card) 68'; Mingoia 72'	Stadium: Spotland Stadium; Attendance: 2,841; Referee: Andy D'Urso

18 March 2014 37	Accrington Stanley	5–1	Morecambe	Accrington
	Molyneux 5', 90+3'; Naismith 11' (pen.); Winnard 59'; Aldred 65'	Report	Amond 84'	Stadium: Crown Ground; Attendance: 1,525; Referee: Nigel Miller

22 March 2014 38	Accrington Stanley	1–1	Plymouth Argyle	Accrington
15:00	Gray (yellow card) 33'; Hatfield (yellow card) 45'; Buxton (yellow card) 78'; Aldred 81'	Report	Reid 32'	Stadium: Crown Ground; Attendance: 1,557; Referee: Trevor Kettle

25 March 2014 39	Dagenham & Redbridge	0–0	Accrington Stanley	Dagenham, London
		Report		Stadium: Victoria Road; Attendance: 1,383; Referee: Mark Haywood

29 March 2014 40	Exeter City	0–1	Accrington Stanley	Exeter
		Report	Odejayi 45+1'	Stadium: St James Park; Attendance: 3,354; Referee: Oliver Langford

5 April 2014 41	Accrington Stanley	0–1	Northampton Town	Accrington
15:00		Report	Hackett 4'	Stadium: Crown Ground; Attendance: 1,616; Referee: Fred Graham

12 April 2014 42	York City	1–1	Accrington Stanley	York
	Coulson 61' (pen.)	Report	McCartan 90+1'	Stadium: Bootham Crescent; Attendance: 3,855; Referee: Scott Duncan

18 April 2014 43	Accrington Stanley	1–1	Mansfield Town	Accrington
	Naismith 90+5' (pen.)	Report	Speight	Stadium: Crown Ground; Attendance: 2,092; Referee: Richard Clark

21 April 2014 44	Southend United	1–0	Accrington Stanley	Southend-on-Sea
	Corr 64'	Report		Stadium: Roots Hall; Attendance: 5,915; Referee: Steven Rushton

26 April 2014 45	Oxford United	1–2	Accrington Stanley	Oxford
15:00	Williams 67'	Report	Odejayi 18'; Gray 54'	Stadium: Kassam Stadium; Attendance: 5,022; Referee: Keith Hill

3 May 2014 46	Accrington Stanley	3–2	AFC Wimbledon	Accrington
15:00 GMT	Odejayi 6' (yellow card) 76'; Gray 19' 47'; Bettinelli (yellow card) 90'	Report	Jones (yellow card) 54'; Midson 73' (pen.); Appian 89'	Stadium: Crown Ground; Attendance: 1,888; Referee: Mark Brown

=== FA Cup ===
9 November 2013 Round 1	Accrington Stanley	0–1	Tranmere Rovers	Accrington
15:00 BST		Report	90' Lowe	Stadium: Crown Ground; Attendance: 1,711; Referee: Seb Stockinbridge

=== League Cup ===
6 August 2013	Middlesbrough	1–2	Accrington Stanley	Middlesbrough
19:45GMT	Jutkiewicz 9'	Report	Carver 40'; Mingoia 81'	Stadium: Riverside Stadium; Attendance: 6,774; Referee: Scott Duncan

28 August 2013	Accrington Stanley	0–2	Cardiff City	Accrington
19:45 BST		Report	61' Maynard; 62' Rudy Gestede	Stadium: Crown Ground; Attendance: 1,617

=== League Trophy ===
2 September 2013	Crewe Alexandra	1–0	Accrington Stanley	Crewe
19:45 BST	Aneke 57'	Report		Stadium: Alexandra Stadium; Attendance: 2,077; Referee: Tony Harrington

== League Two Data ==
=== League table ===
Pos	Team	Pld	W	D	L	GF	GA	GD	Pts
13	Portsmouth	46	14	17	15	56	66	−10	59
14	Newport County	46	14	16	16	56	59	−3	58
15	Accrington Stanley	46	14	15	17	54	56	−2	57
16	Exeter City	46	14	13	19	54	57	−3	55
17	Cheltenham Town	46	13	16	17	53	63	−10	55

Updated to match(es) played on 3 May 2014. Source: BBC Sport
Rules for classification: 1) Points; 2) Goal difference; 3) Number of goals scored

== Squad ==
No.	Name	Nationality	Place of Birth	Age	Position	App(s)	Goals(s)	Joined	Signed from	Fee	Contract
1	Ian Dunbavin	(England)	Huyton	45	GK	166	0	26 July 2006	Halifax Town	Free	30 June 2015
2	Peter Murphy	(England)	Liverpool	36	CB/RB	131	9	1 July 2007	Academy	Trainee	30 June 2014
3	Michael Liddle	(Republic of Ireland)	Hounslow	36	LB	50	0	17 July 2012	Sunderland	Undisclosed	30 June 2014
4	Luke Joyce	(England)	Bolton	38	CM	178	5	1 July 2009	Carlisle United	Free	30 June 2015
5	Tom Aldred	(Scotland)	Bolton	35	CB	15	0	31 January 2013	Colchester United	Free	30 June 2015
6	Dean Winnard	(England)	Wigan	36	RB/CB	183	4	1 July 2009	Blackburn Rovers	Free	30 June 2014
7	Shay McCartan	(Northern Ireland)	Newry	32	CF	2	0	2 July 2013	Burnley	Free	30 June 2014
8	Michael Richardson	(England)	Newcastle upon Tyne	34	RW/LW	2	0	1 August 2013	Newcastle United	Loan	1 September 2013
9	Danny Webber	(England)	Manchester	44	CF	1	1	26 July 2013	Doncaster Rovers	Free	30 June 2014
10	Will Hatfield	(England)	Liversedge	34	RM/CM	53	9	2 March 2012	Leeds United	Undisclosed	30 June 2014
12	George Miller	(England)	Eccleston	34	CM	28	3	19 June 2012	Preston North End	Free	30 June 2014
14	Luke Clark	(England)	Liverpool	31	CM/LW	11	0	5 July 2012	Preston North End	Free	30 June 2014
15	Piero Mingoia	(England)	Enfield	34	AM	10	2	1 August 2013	Watford	Free	1 August 2014
16	Nicky Hunt	(England)	Westhoughton	42	RB/CB	13	0	20 June 2013	Rotherham United	Free	30 June 2015
17	James Gray	(England)	Yarm	33	CF/RW	19	2	2 August 2012	Darlington	Free	30 June 2014
18	Marcus Carver	(England)	Blackburn	32	CF	15	1	1 June 2012	Academy	Trainee	30 June 2014
19	Laurence Wilson	(England)	Huyton	39	LB/DM	21	0	3 January 2013	Rotherham United	Free	30 June 2014
20	Josh Windass	(England)	Kingston upon Hull	19	WG	–	–	24 July 2013	Harrogate Railway Athletic	Free	30 June 2014
21	James Beattie	(England)	Lancaster	48	CF	27	7	9 November 2012	Free agent	Free	30 June 2015
22	Andrew Dawber	(England)	Wigan	31	GK	3	0	1 July 2011	Academy	Trainee	30 June 2015
24	Kayode Odejayi	(Nigeria)	Ibadan	44	CF	0	0	10 September 2013	Rotherham United	Loan	December 2013
25	Rob Atkinson	(England)	North Ferriby	39	CB	15	0	16 July 2013	Fleetwood Town	Free	30 June 2015
26	Marcus Bettinelli	(England)	Camberwell	33	GK	–	–	29 August 2013	Fulham	Loan	September 2013
27	Lee Naylor	(England)	Bloxwich	46	LB	0	0	20 September 2013	Free agent	Free	Undisclosed
28	James Caton	(England)	Widnes	32	WG	0	0	3 October 2013	Blackpool	Loan	November 2013
30	Ben Wilson	(England)	Stanley	33	GK	–	–	27 August 2013	Sunderland	Free	Undisclosed
44	George Bowerman	(England)	Sedgley	34	FW	–	–	21 October 2013	Free agent	Free	30 June 2014

=== Statistics ===
Numbers in parentheses denote appearances made as a substitute.
Players marked † left the club during the playing season.
Players with names in italics and marked * were on loan from another club for the whole of their season with Accrington.
Key to positions: GK – Goalkeeper; DF – Defender; MF – Midfielder; FW – Forward

Players' appearances and goals by competition
No.	Pos.	Nat.	Name	League Two		FA Cup		League Cup		FL Trophy		Total	
No.	Pos.	Nat.	Name	Apps	Goals	Apps	Goals	Apps	Goals	Apps	Goals	Apps	Goals
1	GK	ENG	Ian Dunbavin	4	0	0	0	1	0	0	0	5	0
2	DF	ENG	Peter Murphy	43 (1)	9	1	0	2	0	0	0	46 (1)	9
3	DF	IRL	Michael Liddle	16 (3)	0	0	0	2	0	1	0	19 (3)	0
4	MF	ENG	Luke Joyce	45 (1)	1	1	0	1	0	1	0	48 (1)	1
5	DF	SCO	Tom Aldred	46	2	1	0	2	0	1	0	50	2
6	DF	ENG	Dean Winnard	37 (2)	2	1	0	0	0	0	0	38 (2)	2
7	FW	NIR	Shay McCartan	6 (12)	1	0	0	0 (2)	0	1	0	7 (14)	1
8	MF	ENG	~~Michael Richardson~~ * †	10 (5)	0	0	0	2	0	1	0	13 (5)	0
8	MF	ENG	Craig Roddan *	0	0	0	0	0	0	0	0	0	0
9	FW	ENG	Danny Webber	14 (8)	3	0	0	0	0	1	0	15 (8)	3
10	MF	ENG	Will Hatfield	17 (14)	0	0	0	2	0	0 (1)	0	19 (15)	0
11	MF	ENG	Kal Naismith	29 (9)	10	1	0	1	0	0	0	31 (9)	10
12	MF	ENG	George Miller	4	0	0	0	0	0	0 (1)	0	4 (1)	0
13	DF	ENG	Lee Molyneux *	14 (3)	6	0	0	0	0	0	0	14 (3)	6
14	MF	ENG	Luke Clark	0 (1)	0	0	0	2	0	1	0	3 (1)	0
15	MF	ENG	Piero Mingoia	31 (6)	1	1	0	2	1	1	0	35 (6)	2
16	DF	ENG	Nicky Hunt	36 (1)	0	1	0	1	0	0	0	38 (1)	0
17	FW	NIR	James Gray	21 (14)	7	1	0	0 (1)	0	1	0	23 (15)	7
18	FW	ENG	Marcus Carver	1 (5)	0	0	0	1 (1)	0	0	0	2 (6)	0
19	DF	ENG	Laurence Wilson	13 (2)	0	0	0	0 (1)	0	0	0	13 (3)	0
20	MF	ENG	Josh Windass	4 (6)	0	0 (1)	0	0	0	0	0	4 (7)	0
21	FW	ENG	James Beattie	0	0	0	0	0	0	0	0	0	0
22	GK	ENG	Andrew Dawber	3	0	0	0	0	0	0	0	3	0
23	FW	ENG	~~Connor Mahoney~~ †	1 (3)	0	0	0	0 (1)	0	0 (1)	0	1 (5)	0
23	DF	ENG	Adam Buxton *	11	0	0	0	0	0	0	0	11	0
24	FW	NGA	Kayode Odejayi *	26 (6)	8	1	0	0	0	0	0	27 (6)	8
25	DF	ENG	Rob Atkinson	11 (4)	0	0	0	2	0	1	0	14 (4)	0
26	GK	ENG	Marcus Bettinelli *	39	0	1	0	1	0	0	0	41	0
27	DF	ENG	~~Lee Naylor~~ †	13	0	1	0	0	0	0	0	14	0
28	MF	ENG	~~James Caton~~ * †	1 (1)	0	0	0	0	0	0	0	1 (1)	0
30	GK	ENG	Ben Wilson	0	0	0	0	0	0	1	0	1	0
44	FW	ENG	~~George Bowerman~~ †	10 (4)	3	0 (1)	0	0	0	0	0	10 (5)	3

=== Contracts ===
No.	Pos.	Nat.	Name	Age	Status	Contract length	Expiry date	Source
12	MF	(England)	George Miller	21	Signed	1 year	June 2014	BBC Sport
1	GK	(England)	Ian Dunbavin	32	Signed	2 years	June 2015	BBC Sport
21	FW	(England)	James Beattie	35	Signed	2 years	June 2015	BBC Sport
19	DF	(England)	Laurence Wilson	26	Signed	1 year	June 2014	BBC Sport
17	FW	(England)	James Gray	20	Signed	1 year	June 2014	BBC Sport
6	DF	(England)	Dean Winnard	23	Signed	1 year	June 2014	BBC Sport
4	MF	(England)	Luke Joyce	25	Signed	2 years	June 2015	BBC Sport
10	MF	(England)	Will Hatfield	21	Signed	1 year	June 2014	BBC Sport
3	DF	(Republic of Ireland)	Michael Liddle	23	Signed	1 year	June 2014	BBC Sport
5	DF	(England)	Tom Aldred	22	Signed	1 year	June 2015	BBC Sport

== Transfers ==
=== In ===
Date	Pos.	Player	From	Fee	Ref.
20 June 2013	DF	Nicky Hunt (ENG)	Rotherham United	Free transfer	
2 July 2013	FW	Shay McCartan (NIR)	Burnley	Free transfer	
16 July 2013	DF	Rob Atkinson (ENG)	Fleetwood Town	Free transfer	
24 July 2013	MF	Josh Windass (ENG)	Harrogate Railway Athletic	Free transfer	
26 July 2013	FW	Danny Webber (ENG)	Doncaster Rovers	Free transfer	
1 August 2013	MF	Piero Mingoia (ENG)	Watford	Free transfer	
11 August 2013	FW	Kal Naismith (SCO)	(Rangers)	Free transfer	
27 August 2013	GK	Ben Wilson (ENG)	Sunderland	Free transfer	
20 September 2013	DF	Lee Naylor (ENG)		Free transfer	
21 October 2013	FW	George Bowerman (ENG)		Free transfer	

=== Loans in ===
Date from	Pos.	Player	From	Date until	Ref.
1 August 2013	MF	Michael Richardson (ENG)	Newcastle United		
28 August 2013	GK	Marcus Bettinelli (ENG)	Fulham	26 December 2013	
10 September 2013	FW	Kayode Odejayi (NGA)	Rotherham United	12 December 2013	
3 October 2013	MF	James Caton (ENG)	Blackpool		
1 January 2014	FW	Kayode Odejayi (NGA)	Rotherham United	End of season	
3 January 2014	GK	Marcus Bettinelli (ENG)	Fulham	End of season	
4 January 2014	MF	Craig Roddan (ENG)	Liverpool	28 January 2014	
23 January 2014	MF	Lee Molyneux (ENG)	Crewe Alexandra		
8 March 2014	DF	Adam Buxton (ENG)	Wigan Athletic		

=== Out ===
Date	Pos.	Player	To	Fee	Ref.
30 June 2013	MF	Charlie Barnett (ENG)		Released	
30 June 2013	MF	Aidan Chippendale (ENG)		Released	
30 June 2013	MF	Bohan Dixon (ENG)	(Lincoln City)	Released	
30 June 2013	DF	Tom Eckersley (ENG)	(Tamworth)	Released	
30 June 2013	MF	Craig Lindfield (ENG)	(Chester)	Contract expired	
30 June 2013	MF	Amine Linganzi (CGO)	(Gillingham)	Contract expired	
30 June 2013	DF	Lee Molyneux (ENG)	(Crewe Alexandra)	Contract expired	
30 June 2013	FW	Pádraig Amond (IRL)	(Morecambe)	Contract expired	
17 July 2013	MF	Romauld Boco (FRA)	(Plymouth Argyle)	Contract expired	
13 December 2013	FW	Connor Mahoney (ENG)	Blackburn Rovers	Undisclosed	
16 January 2014	DF	Lee Naylor (ENG)		Mutual consent	

=== Loans out ===
Date from	Pos.	Player	To	Duration	Ref.
August 2013	GK	Andrew Dawber (ENG)	Marine		
2 September 2013	FW	Marcus Carver (ENG)	Halifax Town	One month	
31 October 2013	FW	Marcus Carver (ENG)	Barrow	One month	
28 November 2013	MF	George Miller (ENG)	Chester	Until end of season	
6 December 2013	FW	Marcus Carver (ENG)	AFC Fylde	One month	
2 January 2014	GK	Ian Dunbavin (ENG)	Chesterfield	Until end of season	
