= 2014–15 Accrington Stanley F.C. season =

Accrington Stanley F.C.
2014–15 season
- Manager: James Beattie (until 12 September); Paul Stephenson (caretaker); John Coleman (from 18 September)
- Stadium: Crown Ground
- League Two: 17th
- FA Cup: Second round (eliminated by Yeovil Town)
- League Cup: First round (eliminated by Leeds United)
- Football League Trophy: First round (eliminated by Carlisle United)
Home colours	Away colours	Third colours

The 2014–15 season is Accrington Stanley's ninth consecutive season in the Football League and League Two.

== Match details ==
=== Pre-season friendlies ===
19 July 2014	Nelson	1–2	Accrington Stanley	Little Wembley, Lancashire
15:00 BST	Peet 11'	Report	Hatfield 32', 37'

23 July 2014	Accrington Stanley	2–2	Blackburn Rovers	Accrington
19:45 BST	Mingoia 20'; Gray 55'	Report	Dunn 43'; Cairney 61'	Stadium: Crown Ground

26 July 2014	Accrington Stanley	0–1	Burnley	Accrington
15:00 BST		Report	Gilchrist 71'	Stadium: Crown Ground; Attendance: 3,145 (1,539 from Burnley)

29 July 2014	Altrincham	1–1	Accrington Stanley	Altrincham
19:45 BST	Crowther 51'	Report	Naismith 22'	Stadium: Moss Lane; Attendance: 261

=== League Two ===
==== League table ====
Pos	Team	Pld	W	D	L	GF	GA	GD	Pts
15	AFC Wimbledon	46	14	16	16	54	60	−6	58
16	Portsmouth	46	14	15	17	52	54	−2	57
17	Accrington Stanley	46	15	11	20	58	77	−19	56
18	York City	46	11	19	16	46	51	−5	52
19	Cambridge United	46	13	12	21	61	66	−5	51

Updated to match(es) played on 23 May 2015. Source: BBC Sport
Rules for classification: 1) Points; 2) Goal difference; 3) Number of goals scored

==== Results by round ====
Round	1	2	3	4	5	6	7	8	9	10	11	12	13	14	15	16	17	18	19	20	21	22	23	24	25	26	27	28	29	30	31	32	33	34	35	36	37	38	39	40	41	42	43	44	45	46
Ground	H	A	A	H	A	H	H	A	A	H	A	H	A	H	A	H	A	H	H	A	H	A	A	A	A	H	H	A	H	A	H	H	A	H	H	A	A	H	H	A	H	A	A	H	A	H
Result	L	L	L	D	L	W	W	L	W	W	W	L	L	W	D	W	L	W	L	W	D	L	W	L	L	L	L	L	W	W	D	W	L	L	D	L	D	D	L	D	W	D	D	D	L	W
Position	16	19	24	23	24	21	21	20	17	16	11	16	18	14	15	9	15	12	12	11	11	13	13	14	15	15	16	19	15	14	14	15	15	15	15	15	17	16	16	17	17	17	17	17	17	17

Updated to match(es) played on 3 May 2015. Source: Statto.com
A = Away; H = Home; W = Win; D = Draw; L = Loss

==== Matches ====
The fixtures for the 2014–15 season were announced on 18 June 2014 at 9am.

9 August 2014 1	Accrington Stanley	0–1	Southend United	Accrington
15:00		ASFC Report; BBC Report	Barnard 85' (pen.)	Stadium: Crown Ground; Attendance: 1,505; Referee: Andy Haines

16 August 2014 2	Cheltenham Town	2–1	Accrington Stanley	Cheltenham
16:00	Byron Harrison 34'; Koby Arthur 84'	ACFC Report; BBC Report	Kal Naismith 77'	Stadium: Whaddon Road; Attendance: 2,340; Referee: Kevin Johnson

19 August 2014 3	Shrewsbury Town	4–0	Accrington Stanley	Shrewsbury
19:45	Mangan 7', 65'; Akpa Akpro 44' (pen.); Goldson 45+1'	ASFC Report; BBC Report	Simpson (red card) 43'	Stadium: Greenhous Meadow; Attendance: 4,298; Referee: Chris Sarginson

23 August 2014 4	Accrington Stanley	2–2	Luton Town	Accrington
15:00	Gray 9'; Joyce 16'	ASFC Report; BBC Report	Rooney 32'; Howells 42'	Stadium: Crown Ground; Attendance: 1,562; Referee: Seb Stockbridge

30 August 2014 5	Bury	2–1	Accrington Stanley	Bury
15:00	Rose 35'; Mayor 62'; McNulty (red card) 70'	ASFC Report; BBC Report	Naismith 19'	Stadium: Gigg Lane; Attendance: 3,381; Referee: Kevin Wright

6 September 2014 6	Accrington Stanley	3–2	Tranmere Rovers	Accrington
15:00	Hunt (yellow card) 4'; Gray 8' (pen.) 78'; Naismith 82' (yellow card) 84'	ACFC Report; BBC Report	Bell-Baggie 46' 67'; Stockton (yellow card) 65'	Stadium: Crown Ground; Attendance: 2,151; Referee: Darren Drysdale

13 September 2014 7	Accrington Stanley	1–0	AFC Wimbledon	Accrington
15:00	Gray 83'	ASFC Report; BBC Report		Stadium: Crown Ground; Attendance: 1,238; Referee: Peter Bankes

16 September 2014 8	Oxford United	3–1	Accrington Stanley	Oxford
19:45	Hylton 15'; Collins 36'; Barnett 71'	ASFC Report; BBC Report	Carver 17'; Gray (red card) 38'	Stadium: Kassam Stadium; Attendance: 4,111; Referee: Charles Breakspear

20 September 2014 9	Northampton Town	4–5	Accrington Stanley	Northampton
15:00	Richards 26'; Toney 78', 89'; Carter 90+4'	ASFC Report; BBC Report	Atkinson 22', 37'; O'Sullivan 28', 75'; Maguire 84'	Stadium: Sixfields Stadium; Attendance: 4,731; Referee: Carl Boyeson

27 September 2014 10	Accrington Stanley	1–0	Plymouth Argyle	Accrington
15:00	Naismith 13'; O'Sullivan (yellow card) 64'	ASFC Report; BBC Report	Purrington (yellow card) 55'	Stadium: Crown Ground; Attendance: 1,511; Referee: Niger Miller

4 October 2014 11	Mansfield Town	0–1	Accrington Stanley	Mansfield
15:00	Beevers (yellow card) 45+2'; Murray (red card) 82'	ACFC Report; BBC Report	Joyce 10' (pen.)	Stadium: Field Mill; Attendance: 2,699; Referee: Scott Mathieson

11 October 2014 12	Accrington Stanley	1–2	Dagenham & Redbridge	Accrington
15:00	Maguire 39'; Molyneux (yellow card) 60'	ACFC Report; BBC Report	Connors (yellow card) 48'; Yussuf 57'; Batt (yellow card) 61' (goal) 64'	Stadium: Crown Ground; Attendance: 1,412; Referee: Jeremy Simpson

18 October 2014 13	Stevenage	2–1	Accrington Stanley	Stevenage
15:00	Whelpdale 1'; Beardsley (yellow card) 45+1'; Lee 48'	ACFC Report; BBC Report	Molyneux 19'	Stadium: The Lamex Stadium; Attendance: 2,398; Referee: Graham Scott

21 October 2014 14	Accrington Stanley	3–1	Hartlepool United	Accrington
19:45	McCartan 19', 78'; Atkinson 45+2'; Aldred (yellow card) 80'; Carver (yellow card) 90'	ACFC Report; BBC Report	Bates 42'; Harrison (yellow card) 45+4'	Stadium: Crown Ground; Attendance: 947; Referee: Andy Madley

25 October 2014 15	Newport County	1–1	Accrington Stanley	Newport
15:00	Obeng (yellow card) 43'; Pigott 72'	ACFC Report; BBC Report	Maguire 62'	Stadium: Rodney Parade; Attendance: 3,254; Referee: Mark Haywood

31 October 2014 16	Accrington Stanley	2–1	Morecambe	Accrington
19:45	Joyce 5' (pen.); McCartan 11'; Aldred (yellow card) 90+6'	ACFC Report; BBC Report	Hughes (yellow card) 40'; Mullin 51'; Beeley (yellow card) 58'; Wilson (yellow card) 67'	Stadium: Crown Ground; Attendance: 1,710; Referee: Steve Martin

15 November 2014 17	Carlisle United	1–0	Accrington Stanley	Carlisle
15:00	Asamoah 21'; Grainger (yellow card) 83'; Amoo (yellow card) 90+1'	ACFC Report] BBC Report		Stadium: Brunton Park; Attendance: 4,069; Referee: Tony Harrington

22 November 2014 18	Accrington Stanley	2–1	Cambridge United	Accrington
15:00	Mingoia 34', 72'	ACFC Report; BBC Report	Tait (yellow card) 41'; Nelson 90'	Stadium: Crown Ground; Attendance: 1,364; Referee: Richard Clark

28 November 2014 19	Accrington Stanley	2–3	Exeter City	Accrington
19:00	O'Sullivan 65'; McCartan 73'	ACFC Report; BBC Report	Grimes (yellow card) 13' (goal) 69'; Sercombe 45+3'; Nichols 49'	Stadium: Crown Ground; Attendance: 1,443; Referee: Andy Haines

13 December 2014 20	Portsmouth	2–3	Accrington Stanley	Portsmouth
15:00	Bean 17' (yellow card) 70'; Westcarr 31'; Fish (yellow card) 37'	ACFC Report; BBC Report	Atkinson 11'; O'Sullivan 15'; Winnard (yellow card) 44'; Joyce (yellow card) 45+1'; Mingoia 78'; Hunt (yellow card) 82'	Stadium: Fratton Park; Referee: Keith Hill

20 December 2014 21	Accrington Stanley	1–1	Wycombe Wanderers	Accrington
15:00	Joyce (yellow card) 15'; Winnard (yellow card) 20'; Hunt (yellow card) 33'; Maguire 49'; O'Sullivan (yellow card) 60'	ACFC Report; BBC Report	Cowan-Hall 9'; Jacobson (yellow card) 48'; Pierre (yellow card) 53'; Scowen (yellow card) 90+3'	Stadium: Crown Ground; Attendance: 1,325; Referee: Lee Probert

26 December 2014 22	York City	1–0	Accrington Stanley	York
15:00	Lowe 35'; Halliday (red card) 61'; Morris (yellow card) 90+7'	ACFC Report; BBC Report	Molyneux (yellow card) 90+6'	Stadium: Bootham Crescent; Attendance: 3,873; Referee: Darren Bond

3 January 2015 23	Exeter City	1–2	Accrington Stanley	Exeter
15:00	Nichols 35'	ACFC Report; BBC Report	Aldred (yellow card) 37' (goal) 90+2'; Hunt (yellow card) 45'; McCartan 67'; Joyce (yellow card) 76'; Molyneux (yellow card) 78'	Stadium: St James Park; Attendance: 3,626; Referee: Trevor Kettle

17 January 2015 24	Tranmere Rovers	3–0	Accrington Stanley	Birkenhead
15:00	Donnelly 12' 57'; Fenelon 23'	ACFC Report; BBC Report	Aldred (yellow card) 27'	Stadium: Prenton Park; Attendance: 4,872; Referee: Gary Sutton

24 January 2015 25	AFC Wimbledon	2–1	Accrington Stanley	Kingston upon Thames
15:00	Rigg 37'; Azeez 78'	ACFC Report; BBC Report	Buxton 88'	Stadium: Kingsmeadow; Attendance: 3,859; Referee: Darren England

27 January 2015 26	Accrington Stanley	0–1	Bury	Accrington
19:45	Atkinson (yellow card) 80'	ACFC Report; BBC Report	Cameron (yellow card) 68' (goal) 81'; El-Abd (yellow card) 70'	Stadium: Crown Ground; Attendance: 2,067; Referee: Tony Harrington

31 January 2015 27	Accrington Stanley	1–5	Northampton Town	Accrington
15:00	Procter (yellow card) 19'; Mingoia 40'	ACFC Report; BBC Report	Holmes 5'; Richards 32' (pen.) 67'; Cresswell (red card) 38'; D'Ath 65' 80'	Stadium: Crown Ground; Attendance: 1,328; Referee: David Webb

7 February 2015 28	Plymouth Argyle	1–0	Accrington Stanley	Plymouth
15:00	Alessandra 42'; Lee (yellow card) 69'	ACFC Report; BBC Report	Atkinson (yellow card) 52'; Maguire (yellow card) 90+4'	Stadium: Home Park; Attendance: 6,005; Referee: Brendan Malone

10 February 2015 29	Accrington Stanley	1–0	Oxford United	Accrington
19:45	Joyce (yellow card) 32'; Winnard (yellow card) 81'; Gornell 90+1'	ACFC Report; BBC Report	Hoban (yellow card) 87'	Stadium: Crown Ground; Attendance: 1,065; Referee: Mark Haywood

14 February 2015 30	Southend United	1–2	Accrington Stanley	Southend-on-Sea
15:00	Corr 72'; Timlin (yellow card) 75'	ACFC Report; BBC Report	Procter (yellow card) 41'; Mingoia 53' (yellow card) 66'; Davies (yellow card) 65'; Gornell 71'; Winnard (yellow card) 88'	Stadium: Roots Hall; Attendance: 5,241; Referee: Mick Russell

20 February 2015 31	Accrington Stanley	1–1	Cheltenham Town	Accrington
19:45	Conneely (yellow card) 33'; McCartan 59'	ACFC Report; BBC Report	Burns 31'; Brown (yellow card) 64'	Stadium: Crown Ground; Attendance: 1,216; Referee: Oliver Langford

24 February 2015 32	Accrington Stanley	1–0	Burton Albion	Accrington
19:45	Windass 23'; Procter (yellow card) 49'; Atkinson (yellow card) 84'	ACFC Report; BBC Report		Stadium: Crown Ground; Attendance: 919; Referee: Mark Brown

28 February 2015 33	Luton Town	2–0	Accrington Stanley	Luton
15:00	Stockley 41'; Franks (yellow card) 45+3'; Guttridge 60'; Elliot Lee (yellow card) 71'	ACFC Report; BBC Report	Atkinson (yellow card) 48'; Windass (yellow card) 85'; Crooks (yellow card) 88'	Stadium: Kenilworth Road; Attendance: 8,700; Referee: Lee Collins

3 March 2015 34	Accrington Stanley	1–2	Shrewsbury Town	Accrington
19:45	Barry (yellow card) 10'; Procter (yellow card) 30'; Windass 38' (pen.)	ACFC Report; Report	Grant 11' 87'	Stadium: Crown Ground; Attendance: 1,137; Referee: Geoff Eltringham

7 March 2015 35	Accrington Stanley	1–1	Portsmouth	Accrington
15:00	Windass 16'; Atkinson (yellow card) 41'; Barry (red card) 53'	ACFC Report; Report	Taylor 20'; Robinson (yellow card) 57'	Stadium: Crown Ground; Attendance: 1,994; Referee: Rob Lewis

14 March 2015 36	Burton Albion	3–0	Accrington Stanley	Burton-upon-Trent
15:00	McCory 27' (pen.); Edwards (yellow card) 73'; Beavon 74'; Palmer 85'	ACFC Report; BBC Report	Atkinson (yellow card) 27'	Stadium: Pirelli Stadium; Attendance: 3,293; Referee: Carl Boyeson

17 March 2015 37	Wycombe Wanderers	2–2	Accrington Stanley	High Wycombe
19:45	Wood 30'; Mawson 70'	ACFC Report; BBC Report	Winnard (yellow card) 37'; Gornell 45+1'; Mingoia 61'	Stadium: Adams Park; Attendance: 2,621; Referee: Steve Martin

21 March 2015 38	Accrington Stanley	2–2	York City	Accrington
15:00	Joyce (yellow card) 41'; Maguire 69'; Windass 90'	ACFC Report; BBC Report	Halliday (yellow card) 19'; Summerfield 63'; Hyde 76'	Stadium: Crown Ground; Attendance: 1,454; Referee: Graham Horwood

27 March 2015 39	Accrington Stanley	0–2	Newport County	Accrington
19:45	Joyce (yellow card) 45+1'; Winnard (yellow card) 90'	ACFC Report; BBC Report	Storey (yellow card) 19'; Tutonda (yellow card) 51'; Davies 66' (o.g.); Jeffers 90+5'	Stadium: Crown Ground; Attendance: 1,111; Referee: Kevin Wright

3 April 2015 40	Morecambe	1–1	Accrington Stanley	Morecambe
15:00	Ellison 25'; Edwards (yellow card) 53'	ACFC Report; BBC Report	Jones 28'; Gornell (red card) 41'; Crooks (yellow card) 83'	Stadium: Globe Arena; Attendance: 1,982; Referee: Eddie Ilderton

6 April 2015 41	Accrington Stanley	3–1	Carlisle United	Accrington
15:00	Mingoia 25'; Windass 62'; Conneely 65'	ACFC Report; BBC Report	Dempsey (yellow card) 38' (goal) 90+3'	Stadium: Crown Ground; Attendance: 2,274; Referee: Michael Bull

11 April 2015 42	Cambridge United	2–2	Accrington Stanley	Cambridge
15:00	Elliott 8'; Bird 79'	ACFC Report; BBC Report	Mingoia 39'; Buxton (yellow card) 45'; Conneely 90+1'; Hunt (yellow card) 90+4'	Stadium: Abbey Stadium; Attendance: 5,569; Referee: Chris Sarginson

14 April 2015 43	Hartlepool United	1–1	Accrington Stanley	Hartlepool
19:45	Harrison (yellow card) 43'; Hawkins (yellow card) 45+1'; Hugill (yellow card) 52'; Fenwick (yellow card) 61'; Harewood 80'	ACFC Report; BBC Report	Windass 38'; Bruna (yellow card) 38'; Buxton (yellow card) 59'; Jones (yellow card) 62'; McCartan (yellow card) 80'	Stadium: Victoria Park; Attendance: 4,159; Referee: Jeremy Simpson

18 April 2015 44	Accrington Stanley	2–2	Stevenage	Accrington
15:00	Hunt (red card) 2'; Maguire 15' 40' (yellow card) 68'; Jones (yellow card) 19'; Conneely (yellow card) 85'	ACFC Report; BBC Report	Walton 19' (pen.); Beardsley 89'	Stadium: Crown Ground; Attendance: 1,351; Referee: Scott Mathieson

25 April 2015 45	Dagenham & Redbridge	4–0	Accrington Stanley	Dagenham
15:00	Partridge 20'; Cureton 47'; Raymond 67'; Connors (yellow card) 82'; Gayle (yellow card) 87'; Jones 90'	ACFC Report; BBC Report	Davies (yellow card) 19'	Stadium: Victoria Road; Attendance: 2,038; Referee: Tim Robinson

2 May 2015 46	Accrington Stanley	2–1	Mansfield Town	Accrington
15:00	Conneely 47'; Gornell 71'; Joyce (yellow card) 84'	ACFC Report; BBC Report	McGuire 39'; Marsden (yellow card) 75'; Oliver (yellow card) 80'; Lambe (yellow card) 90+3'	Stadium: Crown Ground; Attendance: 1,921; Referee: Chris Foy

=== FA Cup ===
The draw for the first round of the FA Cup was made on 27 October 2014.

9 November 2014 First round	Notts County	0–0	Accrington Stanley	Nottingham
15:00	Adams (yellow card) 62'	Report	Joyce (yellow card) 56'; Aldred (yellow card) 60'; Procter (yellow card) 65'; Atkinson (yellow card) 80'	Stadium: Meadow Lane; Attendance: 3,661; Referee: Darren Bond

18 November 2014 First round replay	Accrington Stanley	2–1	Notts County	Accrington
19:45	Aldred (yellow card) 11'; Atkinson (yellow card) 40'; Joyce 45'; Carver 49'; Procter (yellow card) 59'	Report	Murray 12'; Cranston (yellow card) 56'; Carroll (yellow card) 83'	Stadium: Crown Ground; Attendance: 1,026; Referee: (England) Eddie Ilderton

6 December 2014 Second round	Accrington Stanley	1–1	Yeovil Town	Accrington
15:00	Joyce (yellow card) 39'; Mingoia (yellow card) 40'; Crooks (yellow card) 55'; Aldred 64' (yellow card) 88'	Report	Clarke 30'; Berrett (yellow card) 74'	Stadium: Crown Ground; Attendance: 1,440; Referee: Seb Stockbridge

16 December 2014 Second round replay	Yeovil Town	2–0	Accrington Stanley	Yeovil
19:45	Gillett 84'; Moore 88'	Report		Stadium: Huish Park; Attendance: 6,373; Referee: James Linington

=== League Cup ===
The draw for the first round was made on 17 June 2014 at 10am. Accrington Stanley were drawn away to Leeds United.

12 August 2014 First round	Leeds United	2–1	Accrington Stanley	Leeds
19:45	Doukara 20', 37'	Report	Gray 84'	Stadium: Elland Road; Attendance: 13,407; Referee: Richard Clark

=== Football League Trophy ===
2 September 2014 First round	Accrington Stanley	1–3	Carlisle United	Accrington
19:45	Carver 21'	Report	Sweeney 24', 49'; Paynter 70'	Stadium: Crown Ground; Attendance: 818; Referee: Lee Collins

== Transfers ==
=== In ===
Date	Name	From	Fee	Ref
20 July 2014	Adam Buxton	Wigan Athletic	Free	
4 August 2014	Luke Simpson	Oldham Athletic	Free	
5 August 2014	Connor Martin	Rochdale	Free	
8 August 2014	Jay Lynch	Bolton Wanderers	Free	
11 August 2014	Jordan Mustoe	Wigan Athletic	Free	
1 September 2014	Andrew Procter	Bury	Free	
7 November 2014	Craig Roddan	Liverpool	Free	
1 January 2015	Seamus Conneely	Sligo Rovers	Free	
2 February 2015	Terry Gornell	Cheltenham Town	Free	
2 February 2015	Gerardo Bruna	Whitehawk	Free	
24 February 2015	Matt Crooks	Huddersfield Town	Free	
17 March 2015	Danny Whitehead	West Ham United	Free	
26 March 2015	Tony Warner	Blackpool	Free	

=== Out ===
Date	Name	To	Fee	Ref
10 May 2014	Luke Clark	Witton Albion	Released	
10 May 2014	George Miller	Gloucester City	Released	
10 May 2014	Danny Webber	Salford City	Released	
10 May 2014	Laurence Wilson	Morecambe	Released	
20 June 2014	Peter Murphy	Wycombe Wanderers	Free	
5 July 2014	Ian Dunbavin		Free	
15 January 2015	Will Hatfield	FC Halifax Town	Free	
2 February 2015	Tom Aldred	Blackpool	Undisclosed	
1 April 2015	Andrew Dawber	Fulham	Free	

=== Loans in ===
Start date	Name	From	End date	Ref
10 August 2014	James Alabi	Stoke City	7 September 2014	
23 August 2014	Joe Lumley	Queens Park Rangers	20 September 2014	
19 September 2014	John O'Sullivan	Blackburn Rovers	15 December 2014	
19 September 2014	Sean Maguire	West Ham United	18 October 2014	
23 September 2014	Aaron Chapman	Chesterfield	19 November 2014	
3 October 2014	Lee Molyneux	Crewe Alexandra	4 January 2015	
8 October 2014	Anthony Barry	Forest Green Rovers	9 January 2015	
17 October 2014	Jesse Joronen	Fulham	14 November 2014	
20 November 2014	Matt Crooks	Huddersfield Town	3 January 2015	
8 January 2015	Matt Macey	Arsenal	7 February 2015	
24 January 2015	Sean Maguire	West Ham United	3 May 2015	
2 February 2015	Scott Davies	Fleetwood Town	3 May 2015	
6 March 2015	Jason Gilchrist	Burnley	3 May 2015	
12 March 2015	Lloyd Jones	Liverpool	4 November 2015	
26 March 2015	Ryan Jennings	Wigan Athletic	30 June 2015	

=== Loans out ===
Start date	Name	To	End date	Ref
23 October 2014	Liam Goulding	Belper Town	14 January 2015	
27 October 2014	George Bowerman	Stourbridge	3 January 2015	
27 November 2014	Will Hatfield	FC Halifax Town	4 January 2015	
14 January 2015	Liam Goulding	Witton Albion	11 February 2015	
31 January 2015	Tom Aldred	Blackpool	2 February 2015	
12 February 2015	James Gray	Southport	13 February 2015	
6 March 2015	James Gray	Northampton Town	3 May 2015	
