= Dawber =

Dawber is an English surname, found mainly in Lancashire. It was originally given to builders using wattle and daub. Notable people with the surname include:

- Andrew Dawber (born 1994), English footballer
- Chelsie Dawber (born 2000), Australian women's football player
- Guy Dawber (1861–1938), English architect
- Pam Dawber (born 1951), American actress
- Paul Dawber (born 1956), English-born Australian actor
- Rob Dawber (1956–2001), British railwayman and writer
- Tracy Dawber (born 1966), English paedophile convicted in the 2009 Plymouth child abuse case
