= Marcus Carver =

English footballer (born 1993)

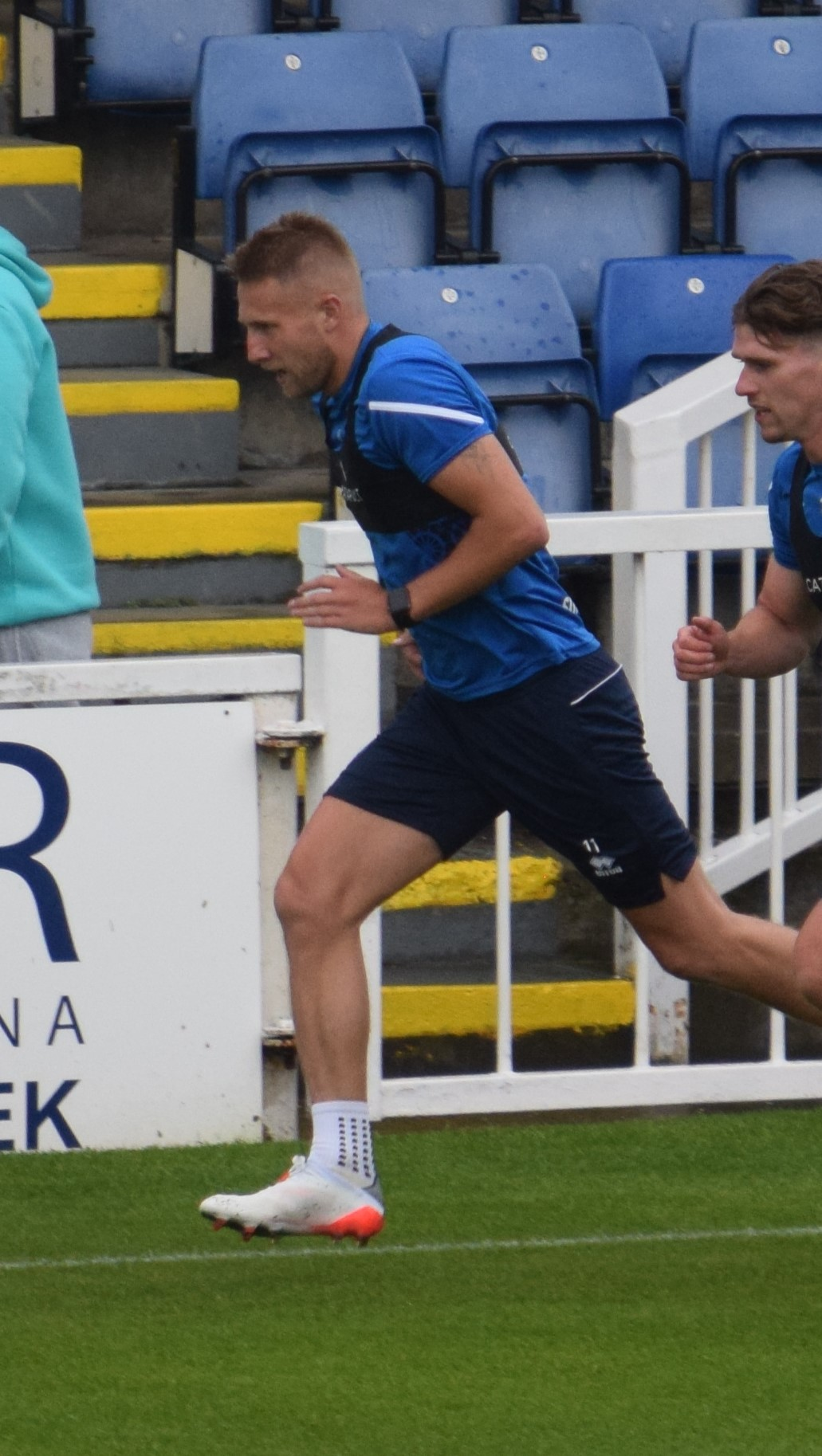
- Carver warming up for Hartlepool United in 2022

Personal information
- Full name: Marcus Alan Edward Carver
- Date of birth: 22 October 1993 (age 33)
- Place of birth: Blackburn, England
- Height: 6 ft 1 in (1.85 m)
- Position: Forward

Team information
- Current team: Bradford (Park Avenue)

Youth career
- 2010–2012: Accrington Stanley

Senior career*
Years	Team	Apps	(Gls)
2011–2016	Accrington Stanley	38	(1)
2012	→ Marine (loan)	13	(9)
2013	→ FC Halifax Town (loan)	5	(1)
2013	→ Barrow (loan)	4	(1)
2013–2014	→ AFC Fylde (loan)		
2015	→ Barrow (loan)	8	(0)
2015	→ Chorley (loan)	15	(2)
2016–2020	Chorley	153	(37)
2020–2022	Southport	31	(16)
2022	Hartlepool United	17	(0)
2022–2024	Scunthorpe United	20	(0)
2022–2023	→ Southport (loan)	8	(2)
2023–2024	→ Southport (loan)	38	(12)
2024–2025	Southport	29	(2)
2025	→ Ashton United (loan)	7	(3)
2025–	Bradford (Park Avenue)	35	(20)
- * Club domestic league appearances and goals as of 12:14, 24 May 2026 (UTC)

Marcus Carver (born 22 October 1993) is a professional footballer who plays as a forward for Northern Premier League Division One East club Bradford (Park Avenue).

== Career ==
=== Accrington Stanley ===
Carver was born in Blackburn, Lancashire, England. He joined Accrington Stanley in May 2010, signing a two-year apprenticeship. In April 2012, Carver was offered his first professional contract, and the following month it was announced that he had signed it, with the contract valid for a year. He made his professional debut for Stanley on 28 April, coming on as a substitute for Charlie Barnett in a 5–1 defeat to Bristol Rovers.

On 15 August 2012, he agreed to join Marine on a one-month loan deal. The loan deal was extended by a further two months after Carver scored 9 goals in his first 13 games for the club.

He had three different loan spells over the course of the 2013–14 season; he joined FC Halifax Town on a month-long loan on 2 September, before joining Barrow on a month-long loan on 31 October, and AFC Fylde, again on a one-month loan, on 6 December. He agreed a new one-year contract with Accrington in summer 2014, and again in summer 2015.

=== Later career ===
After leaving Accrington in June 2016, Carver signed for Chorley with whom he had previously played for on loan. Carver won promotion to the National League in his second season with the club. Carver left Chorley in May 2020 to sign for Southport.

After scoring 12 goals in 17 games for National League North side Southport, Carver signed for League Two club Hartlepool United for an undisclosed fee on 10 January 2022. On 15 January 2022, Carver made his Hartlepool debut in a 2–0 defeat to Bristol Rovers. Carver struggled to find form at Hartlepool; he played 18 times for the club in all competitions and failed to score.

On 2 August 2022, Carver signed for National League club Scunthorpe United for an undisclosed fee. On 22 September 2022, Carver was sent out on a two-month loan deal to Southport. On 27 June 2023, it was announced that he had once again rejoined Southport – this time on a season long loan. He impressed during his early time with the club, winning the league's Player of the Month award for September 2023 after five goals in four matches.

On 10 May 2024, it was announced that Carver would be leaving Scunthorpe upon the expiry of his contract.

On 8 June 2024, it was announced Carver would make a return to Southport on a permanent basis for the 2024–25 season. In March 2025, he joined Ashton United on loan for the remainder of the season.

On 19 May 2025, Carver joined Northern Premier League Division One East side Bradford (Park Avenue) on a one-year deal. On 13 June 2026, Carver signs for Sabden FC and will be a part of the coaching staff.

== Career statistics ==
As of end of 2025–26 season

Appearances and goals by club, season and competition
Club	Season	League			FA Cup		League Cup		Other		Total	
Club	Season	Division	Apps	Goals	Apps	Goals	Apps	Goals	Apps	Goals	Apps	Goals
Accrington Stanley	2011–12	League Two	2	0	0	0	0	0	0	0	2	0
Accrington Stanley	2012–13	League Two	11	0	—		0	0	0	0	11	0
Accrington Stanley	2013–14	League Two	6	0	0	0	2	1	0	0	8	1
Accrington Stanley	2014–15	League Two	17	1	4	1	0	0	1 (Note: Appearances in Football League Trophy)	1	22	3
Accrington Stanley	2015–16	League Two	2	0	—		0	0	0	0	2	0
Accrington Stanley	Total		38	1	4	1	2	1	1	1	45	4
FC Halifax Town (loan)	2013–14	Conference Premier	5	1	—		—		—		5	1
Barrow (loan)	2013–14	Conference North	4	1	—		—		2 (Note: Appearances in FA Trophy)	4	6	4
Barrow (loan)	2014–15	Conference North	8	0	—		—		—		8	0
Barrow (loan)	Total		12	1	0	0	0	0	2	4	14	5
Chorley	2015–16	National League North	15	2	2	0	—		0	0	17	2
Chorley	2016–17	National League North	39	7	0	0	—		4 (Note: One appearance in FA Trophy, three appearances and one goal in National League North play-offs)	1	43	8
Chorley	2017–18	National League North	41	12	5	2	—		3 (Note: One appearance in FA Trophy, two appearances in National League North play-offs)	0	49	14
Chorley	2018–19	National League North	42	14	4	3	—		3	0	49	17
Chorley	2019–20	National League	31	4	2	0	—		2	1	35	5
Chorley	Total		168	39	13	5	0	0	12	2	193	46
Southport	2020–21	National League North	14	3	2	0	—		2	0	18	3
Southport	2021–22	National League North	17	12	5	5	—		2	0	24	17
Southport	Total		31	15	7	5	0	0	4	0	42	20
Hartlepool United	2021–22	League Two	17	0	—		—		1 (Note: Appearance in EFL Trophy)	0	18	0
Scunthorpe United	2022–23	National League	20	0	0	0	—		0	0	20	0
Southport (loan)	2022–23	National League North	8	2	0	0	—		0	0	8	2
Southport (loan)	2023–24	National League North	38	12	1	0	—		1	0	40	12
Southport	2024–25	National League North	29	2	2	1	—		2	0	33	3
Ashton United (loan)	2024–25	NPL Premier Division	7	3	0	0	—		1 (Note: Appearance(s) in Northern Premier League Premier Division play-offs)	0	8	3
Bradford Park Avenue	2025–26	NPL East Division	35	20	2	1	—		7	3	44	24
Career total			408	96	29	13	2	1	31	10	470	120

== Honours ==
Individual

- National League North Player of the Month: September 2023
