= Dean Winnard =

British footballer (born 1989)

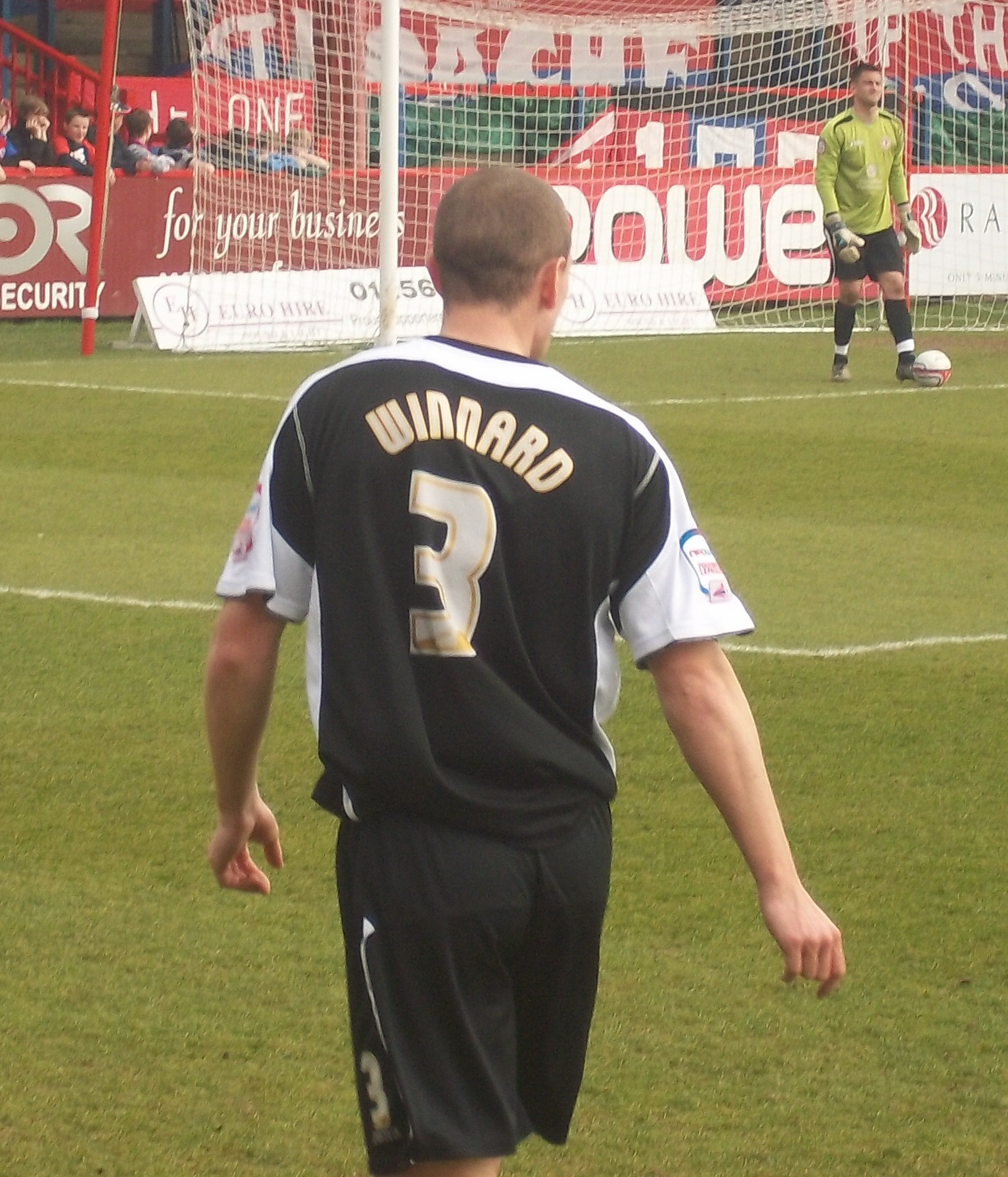
- Winnard playing for Accrington Stanley in 2011.

Personal information
- Full name: Dean Winnard
- Date of birth: 20 August 1989 (age 37)
- Place of birth: Wigan, England
- Height: 5 ft 9 in (1.75 m)
- Position: Defender

Youth career
- –2008: Blackburn Rovers

Senior career*
Years	Team	Apps	(Gls)
2008–2009	Blackburn Rovers	0	(0)
2009–2016	Accrington Stanley	250	(5)
2016–2018	Morecambe	43	(0)
2018–2021	Southport	64	(2)
2021–2022	Marine	23	(1)
- * Club domestic league appearances and goals as of 18:50, 18th April 2022 (UTC)

Dean Winnard (born 20 August 1989) is an English footballer who last played for Marine in the Northern Premier League Division One West. His natural position is as a central defender. However, at Accrington Stanley, he was predominantly used as a left full-back.

== Club career ==
=== Blackburn Rovers ===
Winnard was born in Wigan, Greater Manchester and began his career in the youth team of Blackburn Rovers. He captained the under-18 and reserve teams at Blackburn Rovers. In April 2008, Winnard signed a one–year contract with the club but was released in 2009 without appearing for the first team.

=== Accrington Stanley ===
Winnard signed for Accrington Stanley on 19 June 2009. He previously went on a trial with Accrington Stanley, leading him to sign for the club despite interests from Doncaster Rovers and Rotherham United. Upon joining the club, Winnard was given a number fifteen shirt for the side. Winnard made his Football League debut on 8 August in the 0–1 defeat to Rotherham United. In early–September, he suffered a thigh injury and was sidelined briefly. Winnard made his return to the first team from injury on 5 September 2009, starting the whole game, in a 2–0 win over Bury. On 6 October 2009, he scored his first professional goal (and his first for Accrington Stanley), in a 2–0 win over Shrewsbury Town. Two weeks later on 24 October 2009, Winnard once played in the left–back position, in a 2–1 win over Rochdale. Since joining the club, he regained his first team place for the side throughout the season. However, Winnard missed the last two matches of the season, due to a groin injury. At the end of the 2009–10 season, he made fifty–four appearances and scoring once in all competitions. He signed a two–year contract with the club after being offered a new contract.

Ahead of the 2010–11 season, Winnard was expecting to play in the left–back position by Manager John Coleman. As he played in the left–back position, he helped the side keep three clean sheet in the first three league matches of the season. Winnard later helped the side keep another three clean sheets in a row between 26 February 2011 and 8 March 2011. He then did so for the third time when he kept a further three clean sheets in a row between 16 April 2011 and 25 April 2011. In the last game of the season against Burton Albion, Winnard scored his first goal of the season, as Accrington Stanley drew 1–1. At the end of the 2010–11 season, he went on to make fifty–two appearances and scoring once in all competitions.

Ahead of the 2011–12 season, Winnard was expected to stay at Accrington Stanley for another season after the club saw several departures of their key players. He then signed a two–year contract extension with the club, keeping him until 2013. Winnard started the season well when he scored and set up a goal, in a 2–1 win over Burton Albion on 27 August 2011. He continued to regain his first team place for the side this season. However, in early–October, Winnard suffered an injury that kept him out for two matches. But he returned to the starting lineup, starting the whole game, in a 2–0 loss against Swindon Town on 15 October 2011. On 5 November 2011, Winnard captained the side for the first time in his Accrington Stanley's career, as they lost 2–1 against Bristol Rovers in the first round of the FA Cup. However, Winnard was sidelined later in the 2011–12 season after suffering injuries. At the end of the 2011–12 season, he went on to make thirty–four appearances and scoring once in all competitions.

Ahead of the 2012–13 season, Winnard returned from injury during the pre–season. He then started playing in the right–back position at the start of the 2012–13 season. However, Winnard soon suffered an injury that saw him miss four matches. He made his return to the starting line-up and playing the whole game, in a 3–1 loss against Torquay United on 13 October 2012. Since returning to the first team, he began rotating in playing both either right–back position and centre–back positions. On 27 November 2012, Winnard scored his first goal of the season, in a 2–1 loss against Rotherham United. Despite missing two matches due to suspension during the 2012–13 season, Winnard went on to make forty–three appearances and scoring once in all competitions. On 18 May 2013, he signed a two–year contract with the club.

At the start of the 2013–14 season, Winnard, however, was sidelined with an injury. But Winnard soon regained his first place for the side. His 200th appearance for Accrington Stanley came on 14 December 2013, in a 3–2 loss against Exeter City. On 1 March 2014, Winnard scored his first goal of the season, in a 2–1 loss against Burton Albion. His second goal of the season then came on 18 March 2014, in a 5–1 win over Morecambe. He spent most of the 2013–14 season, playing in the centre–back position. At the end of the 2013–14 season, he went on to make forty appearances and scoring twice in all competitions. In June 2014, Winnard signed a two–year contract extension with the club.

At the start of the 2014–15 season, Winnard started in the first three league matches of the season. As a result, he was dropped to the substitute bench in a number of matches. It wasn't until on 16 September 2014 when Winnard returned to the first team, coming on as a second–half substitute, in a 3–1 loss against Oxford United. Since returning to the first team from injury, he began rotating in playing in either the left–back position and right–back position. At one point, Winnard played in the central–midfield position, in a 2–1 loss against Stevenage on 18 October 2014. However, Winnard was sidelined on two occasions, due to injury and suspension. On 14 April 2015, he returned to the first team after missing two matches, coming on as a late substitute, in a 1–1 draw against Hartlepool United. Following his return to the first team, Winnard returned to the starting lineup, where he played in the left–back in the last three remaining matches of the season. At the end of the 2014–15 season, Winnard went on to make forty–two appearances in all competitions.

In the 2015–16 season, Winnard started the season well when he appeared in the first team, playing in the centre–back position. However, he was soon plagued by injuries on three occasions, resulting in him sidelined for three months. Although Winnard returned to the substitute bench role, he never played for the side for the rest of the season. Despite this, Winnard went on to make seventeen appearances in all competitions. At the end of the 2015–16 season, he was offered a new contract by the club. However, Winnard turned down a new contract from the club and left as a result. By the time of his departure, he made 282 appearances and scoring times in all competitions during his time at Accrington Stanley.

=== Morecambe ===
Winnard signed for Morecambe on 1 June, on a 2-year deal, after being released by Accrington Stanley. Upon joining the club, he was given a number six shirt for the side ahead of the new season.

However, his start to his Morecambe career suffered a setback when he suffered a knee injury and was sidelined for a month. Winnard made his Morecambe debut on 17 September 2016, starting the whole game, in a 2–1 win over Cambridge United. However, his return from injury was short–lived when he was stretchered off during a 3–1 win over Stoke City U23 on 4 October 2016. After returning from injury, Winnard scored his first goal for Morecambe in an FA Cup tie against Coventry City on 6 November 2016. He scored again in the FA Cup replay, where he was captain, as they lost 2–1, putting them out of the FA Cup tournament. Winnard then set up one of the goals, in a 2–1 win over Plymouth Argyle on 26 November 2016. Despite suffering sidelined on three occasions later in the 2016–17 season, he made twenty–seven appearances and scoring two times in all competitions.

At the start of the 2017–18 season, Winnard became a first team regular for the side, starting in the centre–back position. He continued to regain his first team place until he was sidelined with Achilles problem. Winnard then returned from injury on 21 October 2017, where he started the whole game, in a 0–0 draw against Grimsby Town. However, his return was short–lived when he, once again, sidelined with Achilles problem. It wasn't until on 3 February 2018 when he returned to the first team from injury, starting the whole game, in a 0–0 draw against Port Vale. Following his first team return from injury, Winnard regained his place in the first team. At the end of the 2017–18 season, where he made twenty–two appearances in all competitions, he was released by Morecambe upon expiry of his contract.

=== Southport ===
On 1 August 2018, Winnard was recruited by Southport manager Liam Watson as a player-coach for the 2018–19 season.

He made his Southport debut in the opening game of the season, in a 1–0 loss against Teleford United. He was sent off against Chorley on 14 August 2018, in a match that Southport were losing 4–0 at the time. On 10 November 2018, Winnard scored his first goal for the club, in a 2–0 win over Boreham Wood. In a follow–up match, he scored again three days later, in a 3–0 win over Hereford. A month later, his third goal for the side came on 8 December 2018, in a 2–2 draw against Bradford (Park Avenue). At the end of the 2018–19 season, making twenty–eight appearances and scoring four times in all competition, Winnard signed a new contract with the club to stay with them for the following season.

=== Marine ===
In August 2021, he joined Marine. He did not play again following the play off win at the end of the season.

== Career statistics ==
As of end of 2017–18 season

Appearances and goals by club, season and competition
Club	Season	League			FA Cup		League Cup		Other		Total	
Club	Season	Division	Apps	Goals	Apps	Goals	Apps	Goals	Apps	Goals	Apps	Goals
Accrington Stanley	2009–10	League Two	44	0	5	0	2	0	3 (Note: Appearance(s) in Football League Trophy)	1	54	1
Accrington Stanley	2010–11	League Two	45	1	2	0	2	0	3 (Note: One appearance in Football League Trophy, two in League Two play-offs)	0	52	1
Accrington Stanley	2011–12	League Two	30	1	1	0	1	0	2	0	34	1
Accrington Stanley	2012–13	League Two	40	1	3	0	0	0	0	0	43	1
Accrington Stanley	2013–14	League Two	39	2	1	0	0	0	0	0	40	2
Accrington Stanley	2014–15	League Two	37	0	4	0	1	0	0	0	42	0
Accrington Stanley	2015–16	League Two	15	0	0	0	1	0	1	0	17	0
Accrington Stanley	Total		250	5	16	0	7	0	9	1	282	6
Morecambe	2016–17	League Two	23	0	2	2	0	0	2 (Note: Appearances in EFL Trophy)	0	27	2
Morecambe	2017–18	League Two	20	0	0	0	0	0	2	0	22	0
Morecambe	Total		43	0	2	2	0	0	4	0	49	2
Career total			293	5	18	2	7	0	13	1	331	8

== Personal life ==
In December 2013, Winnard were among four Accrington Stanley to be appointed by PFA player ambassadors to work with the club's community trust.

In January 2014, Winnard became a first time father. In October 2016, he became a second time father. In March 2017, Winnard's brother, Mark, died and the club offered their condolences to him and his family on the club's website.
