= Will Hatfield =

English footballer (born 1991)

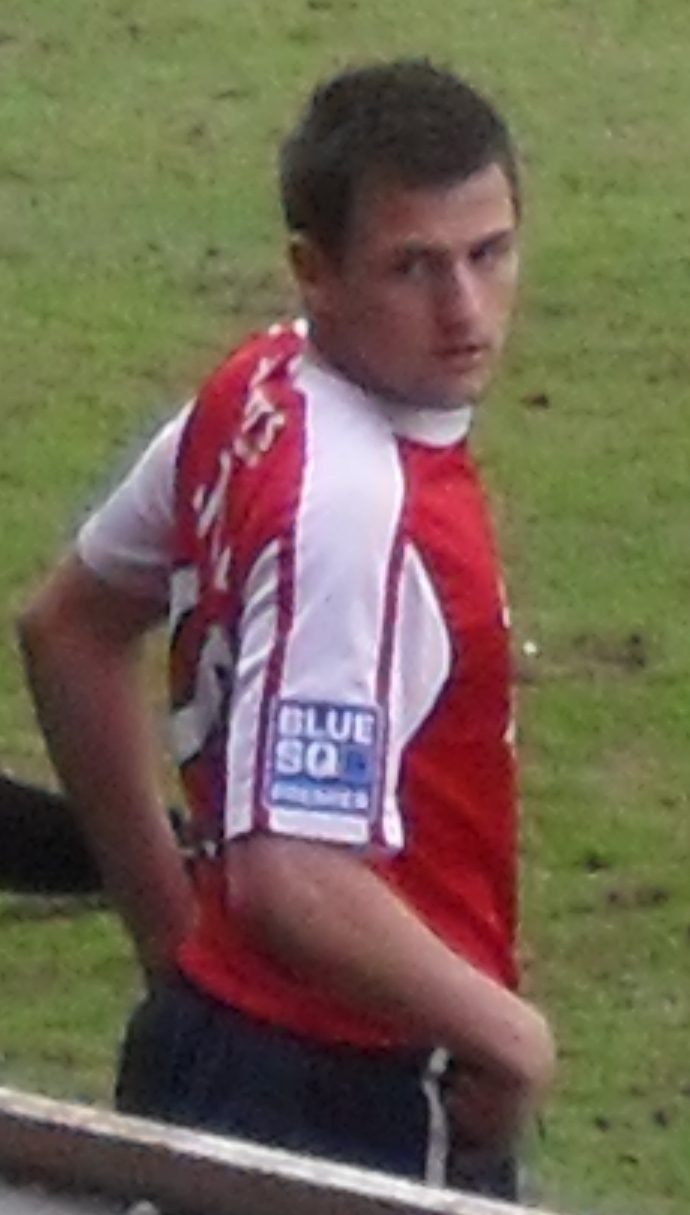
- Hatfield playing for York City in 2011

Personal information
- Full name: William Henry Hatfield
- Date of birth: 10 October 1991 (age 35)
- Place of birth: Liversedge, England
- Height: 5 ft 8 in (1.73 m)
- Position: Midfielder

Team information
- Current team: Darlington
- Number: 8

Youth career
- 199?–2010: Leeds United

Senior career*
Years	Team	Apps	(Gls)
2010–2012	Leeds United	0	(0)
2011	→ York City (loan)	4	(0)
2011	→ Accrington Stanley (loan)	4	(0)
2012	FC Halifax Town	1	(0)
2012–2015	Accrington Stanley	83	(5)
2014	→ FC Halifax Town (loan)	6	(0)
2015	FC Halifax Town	11	(2)
2015–2019	Guiseley	144	(14)
2019–2022	Darlington	69	(9)
2022–2023	AFC Fylde	34	(2)
2023–	Darlington	96	(16)
- * Club domestic league appearances and goals as of 19:33, 4 October 2025 (UTC)

William Henry Hatfield (born 10 October 1991) is an English semi-professional footballer who plays as a midfielder for National League North club Darlington. He began his career with Leeds United, but never made an appearance for their first team. He went on to play in the Football League for Accrington Stanley as well as in non-League for York City, FC Halifax Town, Guiseley, Darlington and AFC Fylde. He returned to Darlington in August 2023.

== Early life ==
Hatfield was born in Liversedge, West Yorkshire, and attended Woodhouse Grove School in Apperley Bridge.

== Career ==
Hatfield came through the Leeds United youth system, having joined the club as an eight-year-old. His first matchday involvement in the first team came on 3 February 2010 as an unused substitute in a 3–1 home defeat to Tottenham Hotspur in an FA Cup fourth-round replay. Hatfield joined Conference Premier club York City on 28 January 2011 on a one-month loan, playing four matches.

He joined League Two club Accrington Stanley on 14 October 2011 on a one-month loan. He made his debut the following day as a half-time substitute in a 2–0 home defeat to Swindon Town in League Two. Having made four appearances, his loan was extended until the end of December 2011. After his loan spell at Accrington ended, Hatfield and his Leeds teammate Sanchez Payne joined Conference Premier club Lincoln City on trial.

Hatfield left Leeds on 12 January 2012 after agreeing to mutually terminate his contract. He signed for FC Halifax Town later that month, making his debut on 24 January 2012 as a 66th-minute substitute in a 2–2 home draw with Gainsborough Trinity in the Conference North.

On 10 February 2012, Hatfield re-signed for League Two club Accrington Stanley on a contract until the end of 2011–12 season. He signed a new one-year contract with the club in June 2012. He scored four goals in an FA Cup tie against AFC Fylde on 3 November 2012.

Hatfield re-joined Conference Premier club FC Halifax Town on 27 November 2014 on a 28-day loan, and signed for the club permanently on 15 January 2015 after leaving Accrington by mutual consent. Hatfield signed for newly promoted National League club Guiseley on 19 June 2015, and went on to spend four seasons with the club. He left Guiseley in July 2019 and signed for National League North club Darlington.

Hatfield was named as Darlington's Away Player of the Year, Players' Player of the Year and Player of the Year for the 2019–20 season, as well as winning their Goal of the Season award for his strike against Kidderminster Harriers.

On 22 March 2022, Hatfield signed for fellow National League North club AFC Fylde for an undisclosed fee. He was a regular starter for the rest of the season, and although playing less often in 2022–23, he made a major contribution to AFC Fylde's league title and promotion. Unable to guarantee him regular football at the higher level, AFC Fylde cancelled his contract, which had a year still to run, and Hatfield re-signed for Darlington on 14 August 2023 on a two-year deal. After the dismissal of manager Alun Armstrong and assistant Darren Holloway on 6 September, Hatfield was one of a group of three senior players tasked with covering managerial duties until an appointment was made.

== Career statistics ==
As of end of 2024–25 season

Appearances and goals by club, season and competition
Club	Season	League			FA Cup		League Cup		Other		Total	
Club	Season	Division	Apps	Goals	Apps	Goals	Apps	Goals	Apps	Goals	Apps	Goals
Leeds United	2009–10	League One	0	0	0	0	0	0	—		0	0
Leeds United	2010–11	Championship	0	0	0	0	0	0	—		0	0
Leeds United	2011–12	Championship	0	0	0	0	0	0	—		0	0
Leeds United	Total		0	0	0	0	0	0	—		0	0
York City (loan)	2010–11	Conference Premier	4	0	—		—		—		4	0
Accrington Stanley (loan)	2011–12	League Two	4	0	0	0	—		—		4	0
FC Halifax Town	2011–12	Conference North	1	0	—		—		—		1	0
Accrington Stanley	2011–12	League Two	13	3	—		—		—		13	3
Accrington Stanley	2012–13	League Two	32	2	1	4	1	0	0	0	34	6
Accrington Stanley	2013–14	League Two	31	0	0	0	2	0	1 (Note: Appearance in Football League Trophy)	0	34	0
Accrington Stanley	2014–15	League Two	7	0	0	0	1	0	1	0	9	0
Accrington Stanley	Total		83	5	1	4	4	0	2	0	90	9
FC Halifax Town	2014–15	Conference Premier	17	2	—		—		3 (Note: Appearance(s) in FA Trophy)	0	20	2
Guiseley	2015–16	National League	38	3	2	0	—		5	1	45	4
Guiseley	2016–17	National League	44	6	2	0	—		1	0	47	6
Guiseley	2017–18	National League	30	1	1	2	—		0	0	31	3
Guiseley	2018–19	National League North	32	4	6	3	—		2	0	40	7
Guiseley	Total		144	14	11	5	—		8	1	163	20
Darlington	2019–20	National League North	31	3	5	0	—		4	1	40	4
Darlington	2020–21	National League North	9	0	2	0	—		5	2	16	2
Darlington	2021–22	National League North	29	6	2	0	—		1	0	32	6
Darlington	Total		69	9	9	0	—		10	3	88	12
AFC Fylde	2021–22	National League North	8	1	—		—		—		8	1
AFC Fylde	2022–23	National League North	26	1	4	0	—		2	0	32	1
AFC Fylde	2023–24	National League	0	0	—		—		—		0	0
AFC Fylde	Total		34	2	4	0	—		2	0	40	2
Darlington	2023–24	National League North	44	5	2	1	—		1	0	47	6
Darlington	2024–25	National League North	45	8	2	1	—		2	0	48	9
Darlington	Total		88	13	4	2	—		3	0	95	15
Career total			444	45	29	11	4	0	28	4	505	60
