= Marcus Bettinelli =

English footballer (born 1992)

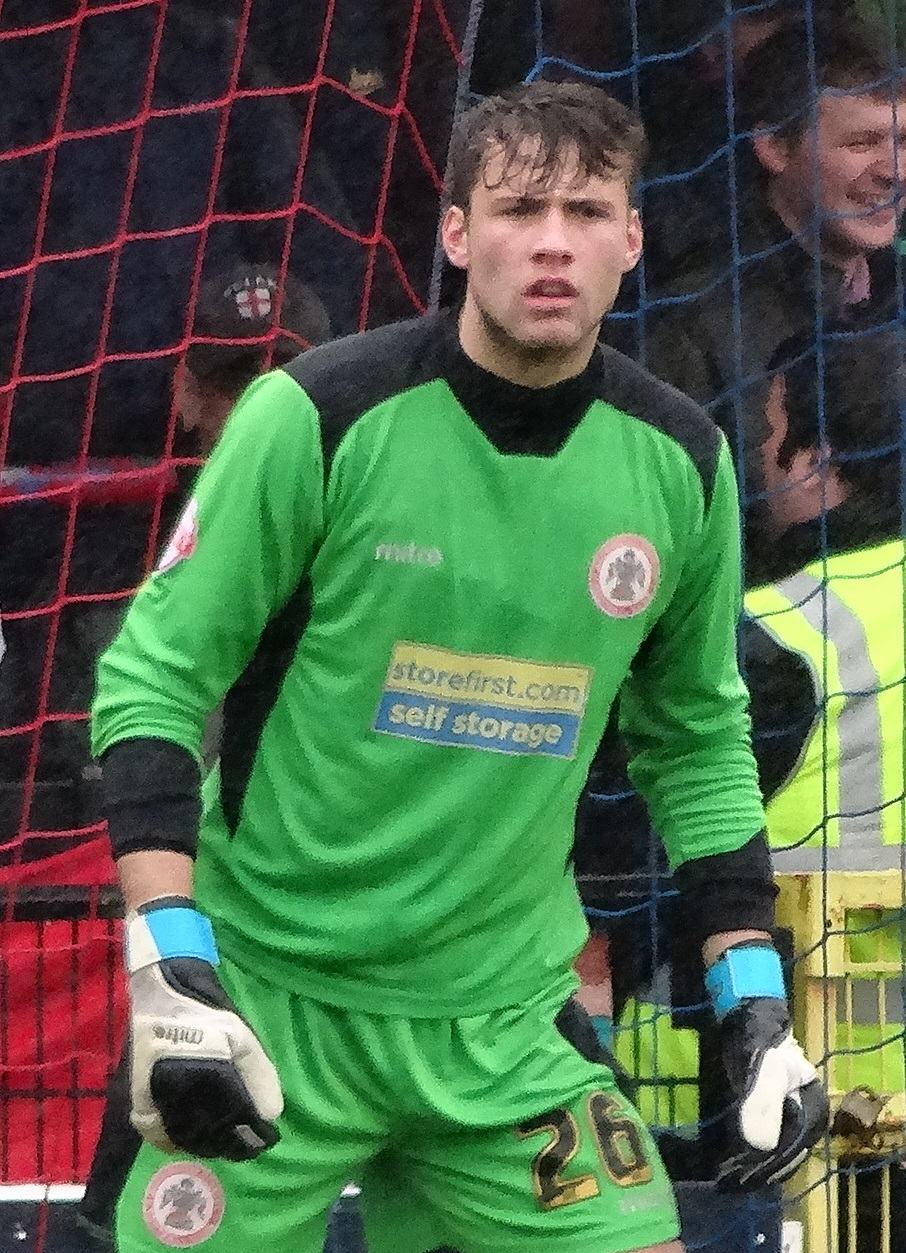
- Bettinelli playing for Accrington Stanley in 2014

Personal information
- Full name: Marcus Bettinelli
- Date of birth: 24 May 1992 (age 34)
- Place of birth: Camberwell, England
- Height: 6 ft 4 in (1.94 m)
- Position: Goalkeeper

Team information
- Current team: Manchester City
- Number: 13

Youth career
- 2006–2010: Fulham

Senior career*
Years	Team	Apps	(Gls)
2010–2021	Fulham	103	(0)
2012–2013	→ Dartford (loan)	35	(0)
2013	→ Accrington Stanley (loan)	17	(0)
2014	→ Accrington Stanley (loan)	22	(0)
2020–2021	→ Middlesbrough (loan)	41	(0)
2021–2025	Chelsea	0	(0)
2025–	Manchester City	0	(0)

International career
2015	England U21	1	(0)
- * Club domestic league appearances and goals as of 21:32, 9 September 2021 (UTC)

Marcus Bettinelli (born 24 May 1992) is an English professional footballer who plays as a goalkeeper for Premier League club Manchester City.

== Club career ==
=== Fulham ===
==== Early life and career ====
Bettinelli was born in Camberwell, Greater London, to an Italian father. He started his career with Fulham aged 14 in July 2006, signing his first professional contract in July 2010.

Bettinelli joined Conference Premier club Dartford on 17 August 2012 on a one-month loan to gain first-team experience. He made his debut a day later, in a 2–0 away loss against Macclesfield Town. Having made seven appearances so far, his loan spell was extended for another month. This would happen again, as it was extended until Christmas. He went on to make 42 appearances in all competitions before being recalled by Fulham on 26 March 2013.

Bettinelli joined League Two club Accrington Stanley on 28 August 2013 on a one-month loan. He made his debut the same day in the League Cup against Cardiff City in a 2–0 home defeat. His Football League debut on 31 August, in a 1–0 home defeat to Burton Albion. Fulham confirmed on 2 September 2013 that Bettinelli would stay with Accrington for the rest of the 2013–14 season, but he was recalled on 26 December and was named as a substitute in Fulham's 2–1 away win over Norwich City in the league as cover for David Stockdale. On 3 January 2014, he re-joined Accrington Stanley on loan until 30 January.

Bettinelli consequently agreed a two-year extension to his Fulham contract on 10 January 2014, which would keep him at the club until June 2016. He made his debut for the club on 26 August in the second round of the League Cup away to West London rivals Brentford, keeping a clean sheet in a 1–0 victory. Four days later he made his league debut for Fulham in the Championship, a 1–1 home draw with Cardiff City. On 5 December, he was sent off after 18 minutes in a 5–0 loss to Watford at Craven Cottage for fouling Matěj Vydra, conceding a penalty that Troy Deeney put past substitute goalkeeper Gábor Király.

Bettinelli signed another contract extension on 30 August 2017, keeping him at Fulham until June 2020 with an option in the club's favour to extend for a further year. He was second-choice to David Button for all but the last six matches of the 2016–17 Championship season and thought that his Fulham career was over, but manager Slaviša Jokanović eventually made him the starting goalkeeper for the following season. Fulham finished third and qualified for the play-offs, defeating Derby County 2–1 on aggregate in the semi-final and Aston Villa 1–0 in the final at Wembley Stadium.

In October 2018, Bettinelli signed a new contract to last until 2021. For 2018–19, he lost his place to on-loan Spaniard Sergio Rico shortly before Jokanović's dismissal in November, and the situation remained the same under new manager Claudio Ranieri. He ended his season in February 2019 when he was ruled out for six months following a knee operation.

On 10 September 2020, Bettinelli joined Championship club Middlesbrough on a season-long loan deal.

=== Chelsea ===
Bettinelli signed for Premier League club Chelsea on 28 July 2021 on a two-year contract. He made his Chelsea debut on 8 January 2022, in the 5–1 FA Cup third round victory over National League side Chesterfield at Stamford Bridge. On 27 March 2023, he signed a new deal that would run to the summer of 2026.

=== Manchester City ===
On 10 June 2025, fellow Premier League club Manchester City announced the signing of Bettinelli on a one-year deal. On 10 April 2026, the club announced that Bettinelli had signed a one-year contract extension.

== International career ==
In November 2014, Bettinelli was called up to the England U21 squad for the first time for matches against Portugal and France. He made his debut for the under-21 side in a friendly against the Czech Republic on 27 March 2015 in a 1–0 away win. This went on to be his only appearance for the under-21 team.

In September 2018, he was called up to the senior England squad for matches against Spain and Switzerland.

== Personal life ==
Bettinelli is the son of Fulham Academy goalkeeping coach Vic Bettinelli, and he is of Italian descent, through his father, Vic Bettinelli. Bettinelli and his wife live with their two dogs. In his free time, Bettinelli enjoys playing golf, video games and watching movies and shows on Netflix.

== Career statistics ==
As of match played 8 January 2022

Appearances and goals by club, season and competition
Club	Season	League			FA Cup		League Cup		Europe		Other		Total	
Club	Season	Division	Apps	Goals	Apps	Goals	Apps	Goals	Apps	Goals	Apps	Goals	Apps	Goals
Fulham	2012–13	Premier League	0	0	—		—		—		—		0	0
Fulham	2013–14	Premier League	0	0	—		—		—		—		0	0
Fulham	2014–15	Championship	39	0	4	0	2	0	—		—		45	0
Fulham	2015–16	Championship	11	0	0	0	1	0	—		—		12	0
Fulham	2016–17	Championship	6	0	3	0	0	0	—		2 (Note: Appearances in Championship play-offs)	0	11	0
Fulham	2017–18	Championship	26	0	0	0	1	0	—		3	0	30	0
Fulham	2018–19	Premier League	7	0	1	0	0	0	—		—		8	0
Fulham	2019–20	Championship	14	0	0	0	0	0	—		0	0	14	0
Fulham	2020–21	Premier League	0	0	—		—		—		—		0	0
Fulham	Total		103	0	8	0	4	0	—		5	0	120	0
Dartford (loan)	2012–13	Conference Premier	35	0	0	0	—		—		7 (Note: Appearances in FA Trophy)	0	42	0
Accrington Stanley (loan)	2013–14	League Two	39	0	1	0	1	0	—		0	0	41	0
Middlesbrough (loan)	2020–21	Championship	41	0	0	0	1	0	—		—		42	0
Chelsea	2021–22	Premier League	0	0	1	0	0	0	0	0	0	0	1	0
Chelsea	2022–23	Premier League	0	0	0	0	0	0	0	0	—		0	0
Chelsea	2023–24	Premier League	0	0	0	0	0	0	—		—		0	0
Chelsea	2024–25	Premier League	0	0	0	0	0	0	0	0	—		0	0
Chelsea	Total		0	0	1	0	0	0	0	0	0	0	1	0
Manchester City	2024–25	Premier League	—		—		—		—		0	0	0	0
Manchester City	2025–26	Premier League	0	0	0	0	0	0	0	0	—		0	0
Manchester City	2026–27	Premier League	0	0	0	0	0	0	0	0	—		0	0
Manchester City	Total		0	0	0	0	0	0	0	0	0	0	0	0
Career total			218	0	10	0	6	0	0	0	12	0	246	0

== Honours ==
Fulham

- EFL Championship play-offs: 2018, 2020

Chelsea

- UEFA Conference League: 2024–25
- FIFA Club World Cup: 2021
- EFL Cup runner-up: 2023–24

Manchester City

- FA Cup: 2025–26
- EFL Cup: 2025–26

Individual

- PFA Community Champion: 2024–25
