= James Gray (footballer, born 1992) =

English footballer

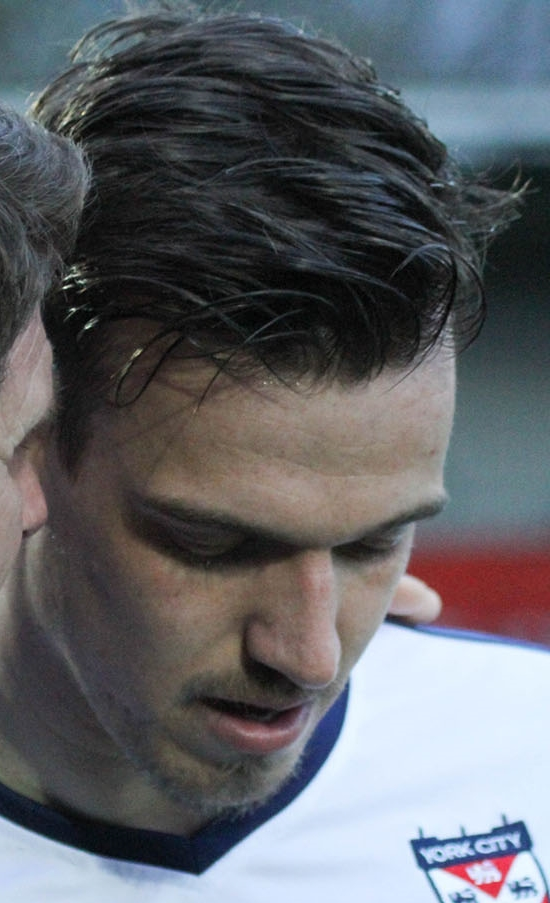
- Gray playing for York City in 2018

Personal information
- Full name: James Philip Gray
- Date of birth: 26 June 1992 (age 34)
- Place of birth: Yarm, England
- Height: 5 ft 11 in (1.80 m)
- Position: Striker

Team information
- Current team: Frickley Athletic

Youth career
- 2007–2011: Middlesbrough

Senior career*
| Years | Team | Apps | (Gls) |
| 2011–2012 | Darlington | 11 | (0) |
| 2012 | Kettering Town | 9 | (0) |
| 2012–2015 | Accrington Stanley | 123 | (25) |
| 2012 | → Vauxhall Motors (loan) | 1 | (0) |
| 2015 | → Northampton Town (loan) | 8 | (3) |
| 2015–2016 | Wrexham | 57 | (12) |
| 2016 | Southport | 13 | (2) |
| 2017 | Glenavon | 14 | (2) |
| 2017 | Torquay United | 13 | (5) |
| 2017 | → York City (loan) | 3 | (0) |
| 2017–2018 | York City | 20 | (4) |
| 2018 | → Tamworth (loan) | 5 | (3) |
| 2018–2019 | Frickley Athletic | | |

International career
| | Northern Ireland U16 | 5 | (1) |
| | Northern Ireland U17 | 5 | (1) |
| | Northern Ireland U19 | 17 | (8) |
| 2012–2014 | Northern Ireland U21 | 11 | (6) |
- * Club domestic league appearances and goals as of 14:49, 17 May 2018 (UTC)

James Philip Gray (born 26 June 1992) is a semi-professional footballer who last played as a striker for Northern Counties East League Premier Division club Frickley Athletic.

A former Middlesbrough youth player, he began his career with Darlington in the 2011–12 season. He moved on to Kettering Town in March 2012, before transferring to Accrington Stanley four months later.

He has represented Northern Ireland at under-16, under-17, under-19 and under-21 levels.

== Early and personal life ==
Gray was born in Yarm, North Yorkshire, and is the son of former footballer Phil. Gray was arrested on 29 October 2015 and charged with drink-driving whilst on the way to training at Wrexham. He was charged at Chester Magistrates Court on 20 November 2015. Having pleaded guilty, he was banned from driving for 23 months. His story was featured in an episode of Channel 4 series 999: What's Your Emergency?.

== Club career ==
Gray started his career in the youth system at Middlesbrough in 2007, before being released in May 2011 at the end of his three-year apprenticeship. He signed for Conference Premier club Darlington in October 2011 on non-contract terms. He left the club by mutual consent in January 2012. He moved from one crisis club to another, signing for Kettering Town in March 2012 on non-contract terms.

Gray signed a one-year contract with League Two club Accrington Stanley in August 2012, following a successful trial spell. He made a scoring debut at the Crown Ground on 21 August, replacing Pádraig Amond on 82 minutes; he scored a stoppage time goal to secure a 2–0 win over Port Vale.

On 6 March 2015, he joined Accrington's League Two rivals Northampton Town on loan until the end of the 2014–15 season.

On 20 October 2017, Gray joined National League North club York City on a 28-day loan. He signed for York permanently on 7 November 2017 on a contract until the end of 2017–18. Gray joined York's divisional rivals Tamworth on 16 February 2018 on a one-month loan. He made his debut the following day as a 55th-minute substitute in a 2–2 draw at home to A.F.C. Telford United. Gray finished the loan with five appearances. He scored one goal from 20 appearances as York finished 2017–18 in 11th place in the table. He was released at the end of the season.

Gray signed for Northern Premier League Division One East club Frickley Athletic on 17 May 2018.

== International career ==
Gray has been capped by Northern Ireland at under-16, under-17 and under-19 levels. He scored on his debut for the under-21 team, in a 3–2 defeat to Hungary on 15 August 2012. Gray made 11 appearances for the under-21s from 2012 to 2014, scoring twice.

== Career statistics ==
As of 17 May 2018

Appearances and goals by club, season and competition
| Club | Season | League | | | National Cup (Note: Appearances in FA Cup and Irish Cup) | | League Cup | | Other | | Total | |
| Club | Season | Division | Apps | Goals | Apps | Goals | Apps | Goals | Apps | Goals | Apps | Goals |
|---|---|---|---|---|---|---|---|---|---|---|---|---|
| Darlington | 2011–12 | Conference Premier | 11 | 0 | 1 | 0 | — | | 1 (Note: Appearance(s) in FA Trophy) | 0 | 13 | 0 |
| Kettering Town | 2011–12 | Conference Premier | 9 | 0 | — | | — | | — | | 9 | 0 |
| Accrington Stanley | 2012–13 | League Two | 16 | 2 | 1 | 0 | 0 | 0 | 1 (Note: Appearance in Football League Trophy) | 0 | 18 | 2 |
| Accrington Stanley | 2013–14 | League Two | 35 | 7 | 1 | 0 | 1 | 0 | 1 | 0 | 38 | 7 |
| Accrington Stanley | 2014–15 | League Two | 17 | 4 | 2 | 0 | 1 | 1 | 0 | 0 | 20 | 5 |
| Accrington Stanley | Total | | 68 | 13 | 4 | 0 | 2 | 1 | 2 | 0 | 76 | 14 |
| Vauxhall Motors (loan) | 2012–13 | Conference North | 1 | 0 | — | | — | | — | | 1 | 0 |
| Northampton Town (loan) | 2014–15 | League Two | 8 | 3 | — | | — | | — | | 8 | 3 |
| Wrexham | 2015–16 | National League | 27 | 7 | 1 | 0 | — | | 2 | 0 | 30 | 7 |
| Southport | 2016–17 | National League | 13 | 2 | 1 | 0 | — | | 1 | 0 | 15 | 2 |
| Glenavon | 2016–17 | NIFL Premiership | 16 | 3 | 3 | 1 | — | | — | | 19 | 4 |
| Torquay United | 2017–18 | National League | 13 | 2 | 0 | 0 | — | | — | | 13 | 2 |
| York City | 2017–18 | National League North | 18 | 1 | — | | — | | 2 | 0 | 20 | 1 |
| Tamworth (loan) | 2017–18 | National League North | 5 | 0 | — | | — | | — | | 5 | 0 |
| Frickley Athletic | 2018–19 | Northern Premier League Division One East | 0 | 0 | 0 | 0 | — | | 0 | 0 | 0 | 0 |
| Career total | | | 189 | 31 | 10 | 1 | 2 | 1 | 8 | 0 | 209 | 33 |
