= Adam Buxton (footballer) =

English footballer

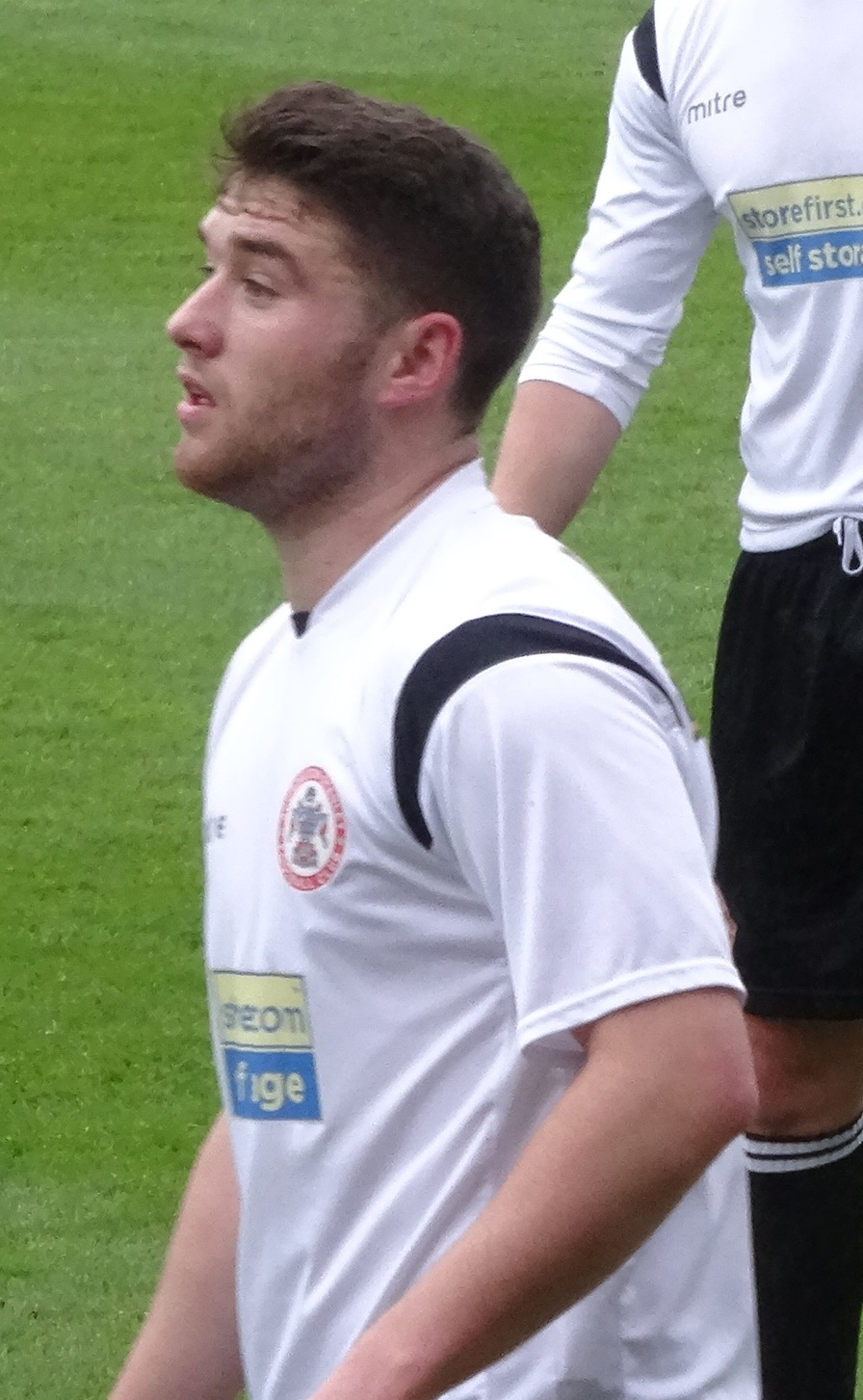
- Buxton playing for Accrington Stanley in 2014

Personal information
- Full name: Adam Mark Buxton
- Date of birth: 12 May 1992 (age 34)
- Place of birth: Liverpool, England
- Height: 1.85 m (6 ft 1 in)
- Position: Right back

Team information
- Current team: Bootle

Youth career
- –2010: Wigan Athletic

Senior career*
| Years | Team | Apps | (Gls) |
| 2010–2014 | Wigan Athletic | 0 | (0) |
| 2014 | → Burton Albion (loan) | 0 | (0) |
| 2014 | → Accrington Stanley (loan) | 11 | (0) |
| 2014–2016 | Accrington Stanley | 45 | (2) |
| 2016–2017 | Portsmouth | 0 | (0) |
| 2017–2019 | Tranmere Rovers | 67 | (3) |
| 2019–2020 | Morecambe | 13 | (1) |
| 2020 | → York City (loan) | 3 | (0) |
| 2020–2021 | Prestatyn Town | | |
| 2021–2022 | Warrington Rylands | 19 | (5) |
| 2023– | Bootle | 6 | (0) |
- * Club domestic league appearances and goals as of 20:56, 18 February 2022 (UTC)

Adam Mark Buxton (born 12 May 1992) is an English footballer who plays as a right-back for Bootle.

== Club career ==
=== Wigan Athletic ===
Buxton began his career at Wigan Athletic, and experienced his first taste of first-team football when he was an unused substitute for an FA Cup tie against Hull City on 8 January 2011. Buxton spent the rest of the season playing for the Wigan reserve team, and went on to captain the development squad throughout the 2011–12 and 2012–13 seasons. He broke back into the first-team setup at the beginning of the 2013–14 season, travelling with the senior Wigan side on their pre-season tour of the United States, and featuring in several pre-season friendlies. However, once the newly relegated side's season had started, Buxton found himself unable to make his way into the line-up for the first-team.

=== Burton Albion (Loan) ===
On 3 January 2014, League Two side Burton Albion took Buxton on loan from Wigan for one month. He was issued the squad number 4, and made his professional debut on 14 January 2014 in a 4–1 defeat to AFC Bournemouth in the FA Cup. Buxton made no further appearances for Burton, and was recalled by Wigan on 1 February 2014, at the completion of the initial one-month loan.

=== Accrington Stanley (Loan) ===
Buxton was sent out on loan again a month later, joining another League Two side Accrington Stanley on 8 March 2014, on a one-month emergency loan deal. He made his debut for the club the same day, starting in a 3–1 league win against Chesterfield. Accrington manager James Beattie said of Buxton's debut performance after the match: "I was very pleased with Adam's display at right-back on Saturday and I think everyone who was at the game saw how accomplished he was." On 10 April 2014, Buxton's loan at Stanley was extended until the end of the 2013–14 season. At the end of the season, Buxton was among five players to be released.

=== Accrington Stanley ===
After being released by Wigan Athletic, Buxton re-signed for Accrington Stanley on a one-year contract. He scored his first goal for the club in a 2–1 loss at AFC Wimbledon on 24 January 2015. In August 2016 Buxton declined a contract extension with Accrington in favour of joining Portsmouth. He mutually agreed to leave the club after struggling to make an impact and only played cup matches in his short stay.

=== Tranmere Rovers ===
On 1 February 2017, Tranmere Rovers signed Buxton on a free transfer on a deal until the end of the season.

=== Morecambe ===
On 29 June 2019, Buxton signed for League Two club Morecambe on an initial one-year deal. Buxton scored his first goal for Morecambe on 28 September 2019, coming off the bench against Northampton Town to score Morecambe's first of their comeback in a 2–2 draw. Buxton was made available to find a new club alongside teammate Andrew Tutte in January due to limited first team opportunities and was released in June 2020.

=== York City ===
Buxton joined National League North side York City on loan until the end of the 2019/20 season.

=== Return to Non-league ===
In the summer of 2021 he joined newly promoted Northern Premier League Division One West side Warrington Rylands on a free transfer from Prestatyn Town.

=== Bootle F.C. ===
Buxton joined Northern Premier League Division One West side Bootle F.C. on 26 May 2023

== Style of play ==
While predominantly a right-back, Buxton is a versatile defender, capable of also playing at left-back and centre-back.

== Career statistics ==
As of match played 11 February 2017.

Club statistics
| Club | Season | League | | | FA Cup | | League Cup | | Other | | Total | |
| Club | Season | Division | Apps | Goals | Apps | Goals | Apps | Goals | Apps | Goals | Apps | Goals |
|---|---|---|---|---|---|---|---|---|---|---|---|---|
| Wigan Athletic | 2010–11 | Premier League | 0 | 0 | 0 | 0 | 0 | 0 | — | | 0 | 0 |
| Wigan Athletic | 2012–13 | Premier League | 0 | 0 | 0 | 0 | 0 | 0 | — | | 0 | 0 |
| Wigan Athletic | 2013–14 | Championship | 0 | 0 | — | | 0 | 0 | 0 | 0 | 0 | 0 |
| Wigan Athletic | Total | | 0 | 0 | 0 | 0 | 0 | 0 | 0 | 0 | 0 | 0 |
| Burton Albion (loan) | 2013–14 | League Two | 0 | 0 | 1 | 0 | — | | — | | 1 | 0 |
| Accrington Stanley (loan) | 2013–14 | League Two | 11 | 0 | — | | — | | — | | 11 | 0 |
| Accrington Stanley | 2014–15 | League Two | 17 | 1 | 0 | 0 | 1 | 0 | 1 (Note: Appearance in Football League Trophy) | 0 | 19 | 1 |
| Accrington Stanley | 2015–16 | League Two | 11 | 0 | 0 | 0 | 0 | 0 | 0 | 0 | 11 | 0 |
| Accrington Stanley | Total | | 39 | 1 | 0 | 0 | 1 | 0 | 1 | 0 | 41 | 1 |
| Portsmouth | 2016–17 | League Two | 0 | 0 | 1 | 0 | 1 | 0 | 2 | 0 | 4 | 0 |
| Tranmere Rovers | 2016–17 | National League | 1 | 0 | 0 | 0 | 0 | 0 | 0 | 0 | 1 | 0 |
| Career total | | | 40 | 1 | 2 | 0 | 2 | 0 | 3 | 0 | 47 | 1 |

== Honours ==
Tranmere Rovers

- EFL League Two play-offs: 2019
