= Jason Gilchrist =

English association football player

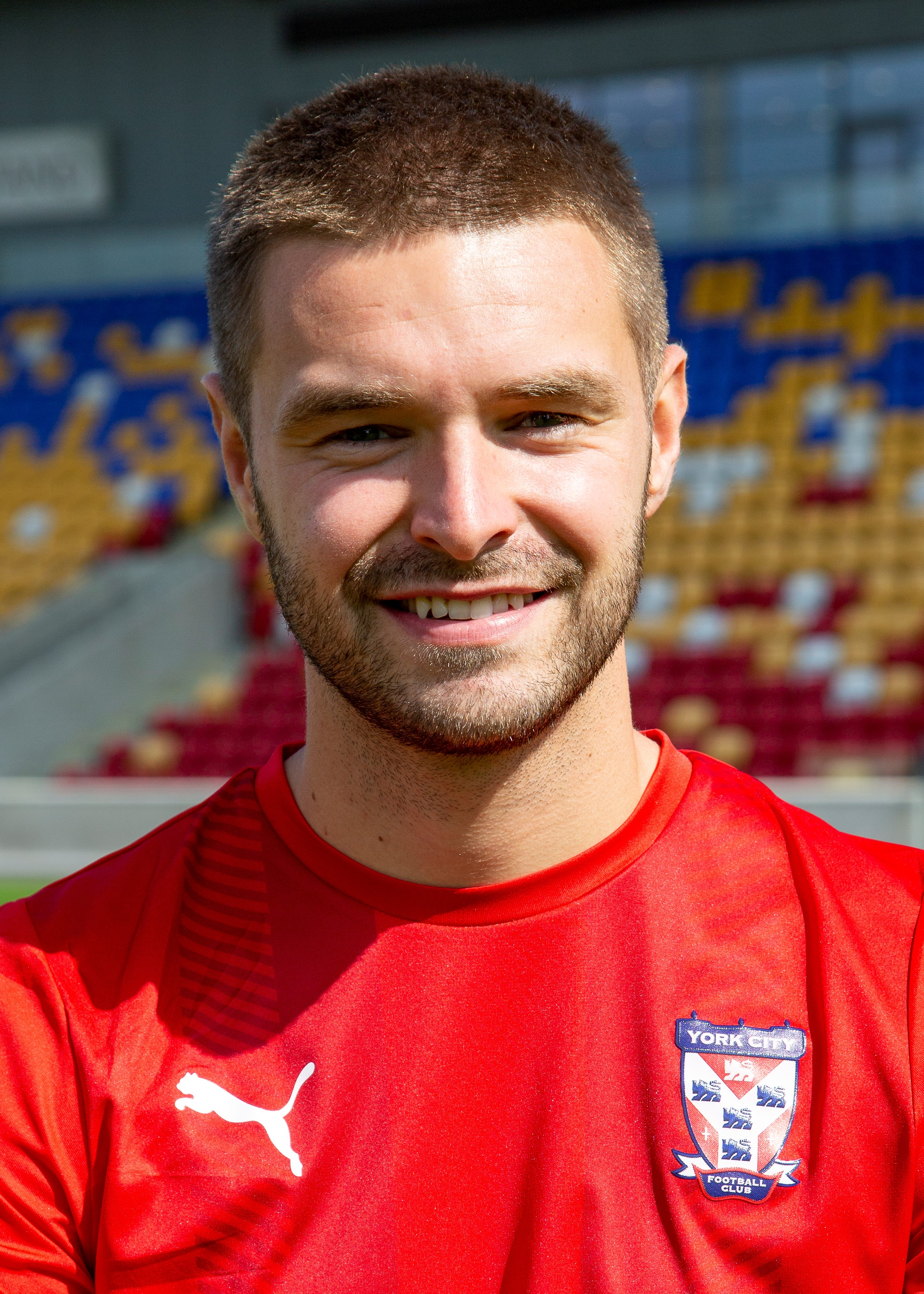
- Gilchrist with York City in 2021

Personal information
- Full name: Jason Lee Gilchrist
- Date of birth: 17 December 1994 (age 31)
- Place of birth: St Helens, England
- Height: 5 ft 10 in (1.78 m)
- Position: Forward

Team information
- Current team: Ashton United

Youth career
- 2001–2011: Manchester City
- 2011–2013: Burnley

Senior career*
Years	Team	Apps	(Gls)
2013–2016	Burnley	0	(0)
2013	→ Droylsden (loan)	10	(1)
2015	→ Accrington Stanley (loan)	5	(0)
2016	→ Chester (loan)	2	(0)
2016–2017	FC United of Manchester	49	(21)
2017–2019	Southport	52	(19)
2019	→ Stockport County (loan)	1	(0)
2019–2021	South Shields	35	(21)
2021	→ York City (loan)	1	(0)
2021	York City	6	(0)
2021–2023	Buxton	34	(9)
2023–	Ashton United	60	(29)

International career
2018	England C	1	(0)
- * Club domestic league appearances and goals as of 19:10, 3 October 2024 (UTC)

Jason Lee Gilchrist (born 17 December 1994) is an English professional footballer who plays as a forward for Ashton United.

== Career ==
Born in St Helens, Merseyside, Gilchrist attended the De La Salle School in the town. He joined Manchester City in 2001 at the age of six, having been picked up by local scout Jimmy Pullen. He spent ten years at the club and was top scorer in six of those seasons. He failed to earn a scholarship with Manchester City and in the summer of 2011 he joined Burnley on a two-year scholarship. In his first season in the youth team he scored 26 goals finishing as top goalscorer. In his second year in the youth team he scored 22 goals, which included a hat-trick at Old Trafford against Manchester United in the FA Youth Cup. In March 2013 he experienced his first taste of senior football joining Conference North side Droylsden on loan until the end of the season. He made his debut for the club in a 3–0 home defeat to Guiseley. His first professional goal came in April 2013 in a 3–1 away win at Colwyn Bay. He made a total of ten appearances for the Bloods scoring once, however, he could not save the club from relegation to the Northern Premier League.

In the summer of 2013 following the conclusion of his scholarship he was offered a one-year professional contract with the Championship side. He spent the majority of his first year as a professional playing in the Development Squad as Burnley gained promotion to the Premier League. In the summer of 2014 he signed a new one-year contract extension, remaining in the Development Squad. In February 2015 he signed for League Two side Accrington Stanley on loan until the end of the season. He made his professional league debut in a 3–0 away defeat to Burton Albion, replacing Josh Windass as a substitute.

In January 2016, he was sent out on loan to National League side Chester on a one-month loan deal. In April 2016, it was announced that he was to leave Burnley at the end of the season after his contract was not renewed and joined FC United of Manchester in time for the start of the 2016–17 season. In November 2017, Gilchrist joined National League North rivals Southport for a club record fee. He scored 26 Goals for the club and was the top scorer in the National League North for the 2017–18 season. He was transfer listed by the club in March 2019. On 28 March 2019, Gilchrist joined Stockport County on loan until the end of the 2018–2019 season. He signed for South Shields ahead of the 2019/2020 season. On 18 January 2021, Gilchrist joined National League North side York City on a one-month loan deal. In June 2021, Gilchrist joined York on a permanent deal.

In December 2021, Gilchrist signed for Northern Premier League Premier Division side Buxton. The season ended in success as Buxton were crowned champions and promoted to the National League North.

In January 2023, Gilchrist returned to the Northern Premier League to join Ashton United.

== Career statistics ==
As of match played 3 October 2024

Appearances and goals by club, season and competition
Club	Season	League			FA Cup		League Cup		Other		Total	
Club	Season	Division	Apps	Goals	Apps	Goals	Apps	Goals	Apps	Goals	Apps	Goals
Burnley	2012–13	Championship	0	0	0	0	0	0	—		0	0
Burnley	2013–14	Championship	0	0	0	0	0	0	—		0	0
Burnley	2014–15	Premier League	0	0	0	0	0	0	—		0	0
Burnley	2015–16	Championship	0	0	0	0	0	0	—		0	0
Burnley	Total		0	0	0	0	0	0	—		0	0
Droylsden (loan)	2012–13	Conference North	10	1	—		—		—		10	1
Accrington Stanley (loan)	2014–15	League Two	5	0	—		—		—		5	0
Chester (loan)	2015–16	National League	2	0	—		—		1 (Note: Appearance(s) in FA Trophy)	1	3	1
FC United of Manchester	2016–17	National League North	36	10	2	0	—		5 (Note: One appearance and one goal in FA Trophy, four appearances and three goals in Manchester Premier Cup)	4	43	14
FC United of Manchester	2017–18	National League North	13	11	5	2	—		1 (Note: Appearance(s) in Manchester Premier Cup)	2	18	13
FC United of Manchester	Total		49	21	7	2	—		6	6	62	29
Southport	2017–18	National League North	23	15	—		—		2	1	25	16
Southport	2018–19	National League North	29	4	3	1	—		5 (Note: Two appearances and three goals in Liverpool Senior Cup, three appearances and one goal in Lancashire FA Challenge Trophy)	4	37	9
Southport	Total		52	19	3	1	—		7	5	62	25
Stockport County (loan)	2018–19	National League North	1	0	—		—		—		1	0
South Shields	2019–20	NPL Premier Division	27	15	1	0	1	0	4	5	33	20
South Shields	2020–21	NPL Premier Division	8	6	5	1	—		1	0	14	7
South Shields	Total		35	21	6	1	1	0	5	5	47	27
York City (loan)	2020–21	National League North	1	0	—		—		—		1	0
York City	2021–22	National League North	6	0	3	0	—		0	0	9	0
York City	Total		7	0	3	0	—		0	0	10	0
Buxton	2021–22	NPL Premier Division	19	4	—		—		—		19	4
Buxton	2022–23	National League North	15	5	2	1	—		1	0	18	6
Buxton	Total		34	9	2	1	—		1	0	37	10
Ashton United	2022–23	NPL Premier Division	18	6	—		—		1	0	19	6
Ashton United	2023–24	NPL Premier Division	32	16	4	5	—		5 (Note: One appearance in FA Trophy, four appearances and three goals in Manchester Premier Cup)	3	41	24
Ashton United	2023–24	NPL Premier Division	10	7	0	0	—		0	0	10	7
Ashton United	Total		60	29	4	5	—		6	3	70	37
Career total			255	100	25	10	1	0	26	20	307	130
