= Andrew Dawber =

English footballer

Personal information
- Full name: Andrew John Dawber
- Date of birth: 20 November 1994 (age 31)
- Place of birth: Wigan, England
- Position: Goalkeeper

Senior career*
Years	Team	Apps	(Gls)
2012–2015	Accrington Stanley	5	(0)
2013	→ Marine (loan)		
2013	→ Clitheroe (loan)		
2014	→ Clitheroe (loan)		
2015–2016	Fulham	0	(0)
2015	→ Aldershot Town (loan)	0	(0)
2015	→ Weymouth (loan)		
2016	→ Bishop's Stortford (loan)	1	(0)
2016–2017	Altrincham	10	(0)
2017	Crewe Alexandra	0	(0)
2017	Charnock Richard		
- * Club domestic league appearances and goals as of 12:59, 23 July 2018 (UTC)

Andrew John Dawber (born 20 November 1994) is an English former professional footballer who played as a goalkeeper.

== Career ==
Born in Wigan, Dawber made his senior debut for Accrington Stanley on 4 September 2012 in the 0–2 defeat to Morecambe in the first round of the Football League Trophy. His performance "impressed" manager Paul Cook. In February 2013, Dawber signed a new contract with the club which ran until the summer of 2015. In August 2013, Dawber joined Northern Premier League side Marine on one-month loan, before joining Clitheroe, also on a one-month loan, in October 2013. He re-joined Clitheroe on two-month loan deal in September 2014. He left Accrington Stanley by mutual consent in March 2015.

Dawber joined Championship team Fulham on a one-year contract in July 2015. He signed a one-month loan deal with Aldershot Town in September 2015, then spent time at Weymouth, before a loan spell at Bishop's Stortford in February 2016. After leaving Fulham he signed for Altrincham in May 2016.

He signed for Crewe Alexandra in March 2017, until the end of the season. On 9 May 2017, Crewe announced that Dawber had been released by the club.

He later played for Charnock Richard, making his debut in a 3–1 win over Hanley Town in September 2017.

== Career statistics ==
As of 10 March 2017

Club	Season	League		FA Cup		League Cup		Other		Total	
Club	Season	Apps	Goals	Apps	Goals	Apps	Goals	Apps	Goals	Apps	Goals
Accrington Stanley	2012–13	2	0	0	0	0	0	1	0	3	0
Accrington Stanley	2013–14	3	0	0	0	0	0	0	0	3	0
Accrington Stanley	2014–15	0	0	0	0	0	0	0	0	0	0
Accrington Stanley	Total	5	0	0	0	0	0	1	0	6	0
Fulham	2015–16	0	0	0	0	0	0	0	0	0	0
Aldershot Town (loan)	2015–16	0	0	0	0	0	0	0	0	0	0
Bishop's Stortford (loan)	2015–16	1	0	0	0	0	0	0	0	1	0
Altrincham	2016–17	10	0	1	0	0	0	1	0	12	0
Crewe Alexandra	2016–17	0	0	0	0	0	0	0	0	0	0
Career total		16	0	1	0	0	0	2	0	19	0
