= Craig Roddan =

English footballer

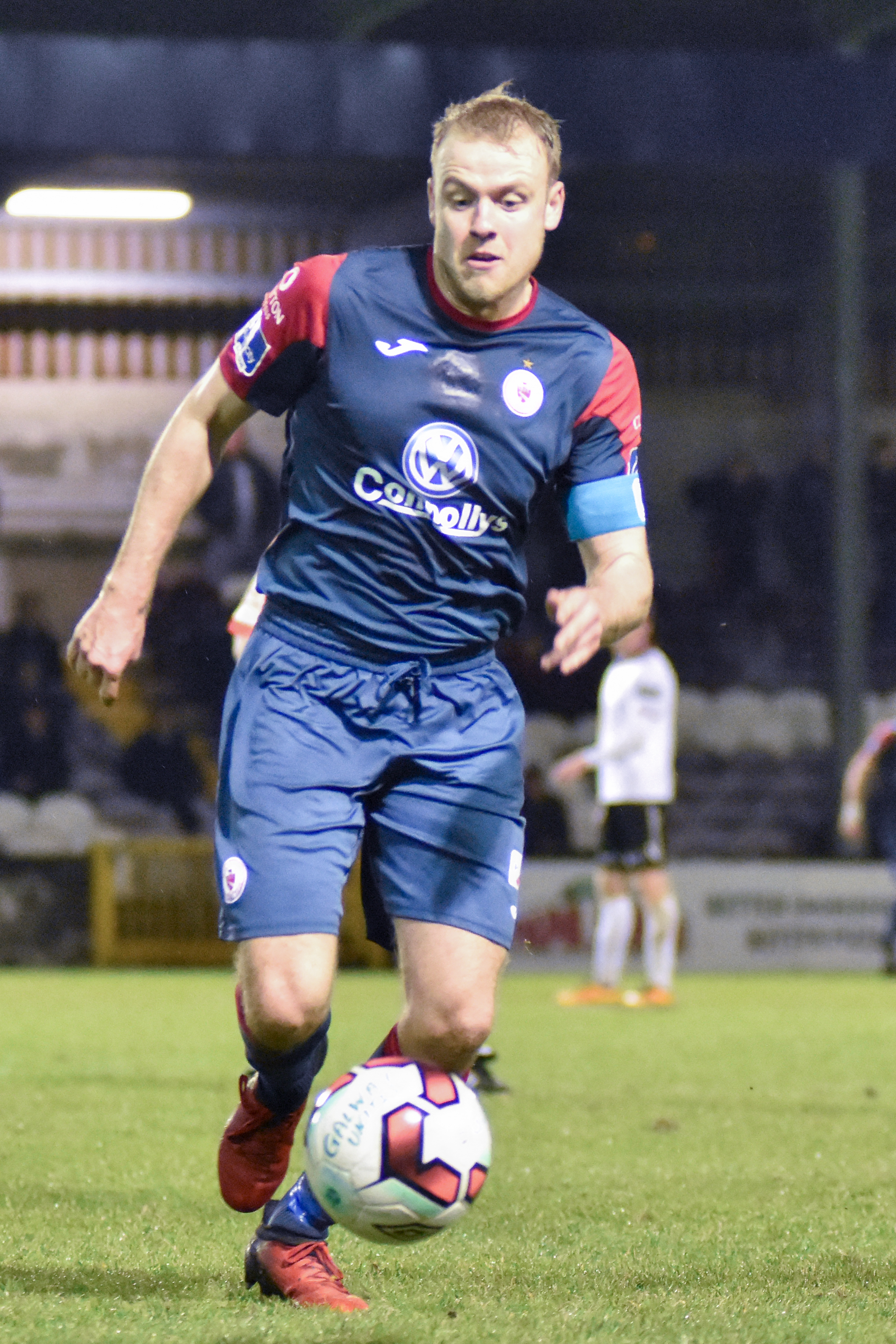
- Roddan in 2017

Personal information
- Full name: Craig John Roddan
- Date of birth: 22 April 1993 (age 33)
- Place of birth: Fazakerley, England
- Position: Midfielder

Youth career
- Wigan Athletic
- 2007–2013: Liverpool

Senior career*
Years	Team	Apps	(Gls)
2013–2014	Liverpool	0	(0)
2013–2014	→ Carlisle United (loan)	1	(0)
2014	→ Accrington Stanley (loan)	0	(0)
2014	Accrington Stanley	0	(0)
2015–2016	Witton Albion	5	(0)
2016–2018	Sligo Rovers	54	(1)
2019	Mossley	6	(0)
- * Club domestic league appearances and goals

Craig John Roddan (born 22 April 1993) is an English footballer who played as a midfielder.

== Club career ==
=== Career in England ===
In 2007, he joined Liverpool academy from Wigan Athletic. While at the academy, Roddan attended Maricourt Catholic School. While in the academy, Roddan revealed he play alongside then-club captain, Steven Gerrard, in a friendly match, describing the experience as "amazing". Roddan was also known for the "Liverpool U18s skill master".

On 28 November 2013, Roddan joined League One club Carlisle United on a month-long loan, due to last until 4 January 2014. He made his football league debut on 14 December 2013, coming on as a substitute in the 72nd minute for Paul Thirlwell against Tranmere Rovers. On 2 January 2014, Roddan went back to Liverpool, following the expiry of his loan.

On 4 January 2014, it was announced Roddan had joined League Two side Accrington Stanley for an initial month loan. Unfortunately the loan was cut short before Roddan had made a first team appearance after he suffered an injury in training. Following this, Roddan was released from Liverpool at the end of the 2013–14 season.

On 7 November 2014, Roddan signed for Accrington Stanley on a short-term deal. However, he left the club on 6 January 2015 upon the expiry of his contract and made just one appearance in the FA Cup during his time at Accrington Stanley.

On 14 February 2015, Gornell signed for Northern Premier League team Witton Albion, making his debut the same day in the 2–2 home draw against Barwell. Roddan went on to make five appearances for the club before being released on 5 January 2016.

=== Sligo Rovers ===
On 27 January 2016, Rodan moved to Ireland by signing for League of Ireland team Sligo Rovers. Upon joining the club, he stated the move to Sligo Rovers was to suit his playing style.

Roddan made his Sligo Rovers debut in the opening game of the season against Shamrock Rovers, but was sent-off in the 75th minute after a second bookable offence, in a 2–0 loss. After serving a two match suspension, he returned to the starting line–up, in a 1–1 draw against Finn Harps on 19 March 2016. Roddan then captained his first match as a Sligo Rovers player and went on to draw 1–1 against St Patrick's Athletic on 8 April 2016. Since joining the club, he established himself in the starting line–up, playing in the midfield position, as well as, being the captain. However, Roddan continued to face on two occasions later in the 2016 season, including a sending off against Dundalk on 6 September 2016. Despite this, he helped Sligo Rovers finish fifth place in the league.

At the start of the 2017 season, Roddan continued to regain his first team place, playing in the midfield position, as well as, retaining his captaincy. Halfway through the season, he found himself placed on the substitute bench, due to injury sustained. But Roddan managed to regain his first team place until he was suspended on two occasions, including a sending off for a second bookable offence, in a 1–0 win against Cork City on 18 August 2017. Despite this, Roddan scored his first goal for Sligo Rovers, in a 3–0 win against Derry City on 21 October 2017. His contributions for the club saw them avoid relegation, finishing ninth place in the league. At the end of the 2017 season, he went on to make twenty–five appearances and scoring once in all competitions.

Ahead of the 2018 season, Roddan confirmed his stay at the club for another season. He found himself alternating between a starting and a substitute role. It was announced on 15 April 2018 that Roddan left Sligo Rovers by mutual consent. By the time he departed the club, Roddan made six appearances in the 2018 season/

=== Return to England ===
After being a free agent for over a year, Roddan returned to England and joined Mossley on 13 August 2019. He went on to make six appearances before being released by the club.

== Career statistics ==
As of match played 11 March 2016.

Club	Season	League			FA Cup		League Cup		Other		Total	
Club	Season	Division	Apps	Goals	Apps	Goals	Apps	Goals	Apps	Goals	Apps	Goals
Liverpool	2013–14	Premier League	0	0	0	0	0	0	0	0	0	0
Liverpool	Total		0	0	0	0	0	0	0	0	0	0
Carlisle United (loan)	2013–14	League One	1	0	0	0	0	0	0	0	1	0
Accrington Stanley (loan)	2013–14	League Two	0	0	1	0	0	0	0	0	1	0
Witton Albion	2014-2015	Northern Premier League	5	0	0	0	0	0	0	0	5	0
Sligo Rovers	2016	League of Ireland	28	0	0	0	0	0	0	0	28	0
Sligo Rovers	2017	League of Ireland	25	1	0	0	0	0	1	0	26	1
Sligo Rovers	2018	League of Ireland	5	0	0	0	0	0	0	0	5	0
Career total			58	0	1	0	0	0	1	0	66	1
