= Peter Murphy (footballer, born 1990) =

English footballer

Personal information
- Full name: Peter James Murphy
- Date of birth: 13 February 1990 (age 36)
- Place of birth: Liverpool, England
- Height: 6 ft 0 in (1.83 m)
- Positions: Defender; midfielder

Youth career
- 2006–2008: Accrington Stanley

Senior career*
Years	Team	Apps	(Gls)
2008–2014	Accrington Stanley	155	(18)
2008	→ Prescot Cables (loan)	6	(0)
2014–2015	Wycombe Wanderers	42	(7)
2015–2017	Morecambe	39	(4)
Total		242	(29)
- * Club domestic league appearances and goals

Peter James Murphy (born 13 February 1990) is an English former professional footballer who played primarily as a midfielder but was also a capable defender.

== Playing career ==
Murphy joined Stanley as a 16-year-old. Towards the end of the 2007–08 season, he spent a few weeks on loan at Northern Premier League club Prescot Cables to gain experience, and signed his first professional contract with Stanley on his return from loan, in April 2008. He made his debut for Stanley on 26 April, in the Football League Two clash with Wrexham which ended as a 3–1 win. He signed a new contract in May 2010 and again in 2012. He then signed for Wycombe Wanderers in 2014 on a free transfer. He opened the scoring for Wycombe on his debut, as they beat Newport County 2–0.

He joined Morecambe on 8 June 2015. He scored his first goal for the club in a 4–2 loss against Cambridge United on 24 November 2015.

At the end of the 2016–2017 season, Murphy announced his retirement from playing, aged 27, following a long-term injury.

== Coaching career ==
Since retiring Murphy has coached at Everton, Rochdale and Wigan. He is now a first team coach at Preston North End.

== Career statistics ==
Appearances and goals by club, season and competition
Club	Season	League			FA Cup		League Cup		Other		Total	
Club	Season	Division	Apps	Goals	Apps	Goals	Apps	Goals	Apps	Goals	Apps	Goals
Accrington Stanley	2007–08	League Two	2	0	0	0	0	0	0	0	2	0
Accrington Stanley	2008–09	League Two	3	0	0	0	1	0	1 (Note: Appearance(s) in Football League Trophy)	0	5	0
Accrington Stanley	2009–10	League Two	10	0	2	0	1	0	2	0	15	0
Accrington Stanley	2010–11	League Two	13	0	0	0	1	0	1	0	15	0
Accrington Stanley	2011–12	League Two	38	4	0	0	1	0	2	0	41	4
Accrington Stanley	2012–13	League Two	45	5	3	0	1	0	1	0	50	5
Accrington Stanley	2013–14	League Two	44	9	1	0	2	0	0	0	47	9
Total			155	18	6	0	7	0	7	0	175	18
→ Prescot Cables (loan)	2007–08	NPL Premier Division	6	0	0	0	0	0	0	0	6	0
Wycombe Wanderers	2014–15	League Two	42	7	2	0	1	0	2 (Note: Appearance(s) in League Two play-offs)	0	47	7
Total			42	7	2	0	1	0	2	0	47	7
Morecambe	2015–16	League Two	7	1	0	0	0	0	1	0	8	1
Morecambe	2016–17	League Two	32	3	2	0	0	0	4	1	38	4
Total			39	4	2	0	0	0	5	1	46	5
Career total			242	29	10	0	8	0	14	1	274	30
