= 2012–13 Preston North End F.C. season =

English football club season

Preston North End
2012–13 season
- Manager: Graham Westley (until 13 Feb); Simon Grayson (from 18 Feb)
- Stadium: Deepdale
- League One: 14th
- FA Cup: 3rd Round
- League Cup: 3rd Round
- League Trophy: Area Semi-Final
- Top goalscorer: League: Nicky Wroe (8); All: Nicky Wroe (11)
- Highest home attendance: 12,014 vs Bury, 26 Dec 2012
- Lowest home attendance: 4,757 vs Yeovil Town, 3 Nov 2012
- Average home league attendance: 8,190
Home colours	Away colours	Third colours

The 2012–13 season was Preston North End's 124th year in The Football League and their second consecutive in the third tier.

On 13 February 2013, manager Graham Westley was sacked, with the club five points above the relegation places. Five days later, Simon Grayson was appointed as his replacement. Preston finished the League One season in 14th, on 59 points.

== League One data ==
=== League table ===
Pos	Team	Pld	W	D	L	GF	GA	GD	Pts
12	Notts County	46	16	17	13	61	49	+12	65
13	Crewe Alexandra	46	18	10	18	54	62	−8	64
14	Preston North End	46	14	17	15	54	49	+5	59
15	Coventry City	46	18	11	17	66	59	+7	55 (Note: On 28 March Coventry City were deducted ten points for entering administration.)
16	Shrewsbury Town	46	13	16	17	54	60	−6	55

Updated to match(es) played on 27 April 2013. Source: BBC Sport
Rules for classification: 1) Points; 2) Goal difference; 3) Number of goals scored

=== Results summary ===
Overall								Home						Away					
Pld	W	D	L	GF	GA	GD	Pts	W	D	L	GF	GA	GD	W	D	L	GF	GA	GD
15	5	5	5	24	19	+5	20	3	3	2	15	8	+7	2	2	3	9	11	−2

Last updated: 5 February 2013.
Source: PNEFC League One Results

== Kit ==
Supplier: Puma
Sponsor(s): Magners (H), Tennent's Lager (A)

Home	Home Alternate	Away	Away Alternate	Alternative	2nd Alternative

Last updated: 11 September 2012.
Source: Historical Football Kit – NPower League One 2012–13

== Squad ==
No.	Name	Position (s)	Nationality	Place of Birth	Date of Birth (Age)	Club caps	Club goals	Int. caps	Int. goals	Date signed	Signed from	Fee	Contract End
Goalkeepers
1	Thorsten Stuckmann	GK	(Germany)	Gütersloh	17 March 1981 (age 45)	32	0	–	–	1 November 2011	Free agent	Free	30 June 2013
23	Declan Rudd	GK	(England)	Diss	16 January 1991 (age 35)	–	–	–	–	19 January 2013	Norwich City	Loan	31 May 2013
Defenders
2	Keith Keane	RB/RM	(Republic of Ireland)	Luton (England)	20 November 1986 (aged 26)	–	–	–	–	7 June 2012	Luton Town	Free	30 June 2014
3	Scott Laird	LB/LM/CM	(England)	Taunton	15 May 1988 (age 38)	–	–	–	–	27 May 2012	Stevenage	Free	30 June 2014
4	Paul Huntington	CB/RB	(England)	Carlisle	17 September 1987 (age 38)	–	–	–	–	1 July 2012	Yeovil Town	Free	30 June 2014
5	Chris Robertson	CB/RB	(Scotland)	Dundee	11 October 1986 (aged 26)	17	1	–	–	31 January 2012	Torquay United	Undisclosed	30 June 2014
6	Shane Cansdell-Sherriff	CB/LB/DM	(Australia)	Sydney	10 November 1982 (age 43)	–	–	–	–	16 May 2012	Shrewsbury Town	Free	30 June 2014
16	David Buchanan	LB/LM	(England)	Rochdale	6 May 1986 (age 40)	–	–	–	–	24 May 2012	Tranmere Rovers	Free	30 June 2014
26	Bailey Wright	CB/RB/LB	(Australia)	Melbourne	28 July 1992 (age 33)	16	1	–	–	1 July 2009	Academy	Trainee	30 June 2013
27	Luke Foster	CB	(England)	Mexborough	8 September 1985 (aged 27)	–	–	–	–	18 December 2012	Free agent	Free	30 June 2013
28	Ben Davies	CB	(England)	Barrow-in-Furness	11 August 1995 (age 30)	–	–	–	–	25 January 2013	Academy	Trainee	30 June 2014
Midfielders
8	Nicky Wroe	CM/RM	(England)	Sheffield	28 September 1985 (age 40)	–	–	–	–	16 May 2012	Shrewsbury Town	Free	30 June 2014
11	Lee Holmes	LM/RM/AM	(England)	Mansfield	2 April 1987 (age 39)	–	–	–	–	29 May 2012	Southampton	Free	30 June 2014
13	Joel Byrom	CM	(England)	Oswaldtwistle	14 September 1986 (age 39)	–	–	–	–	1 July 2012	Stevenage	Free	30 June 2014
17	Jeffrey Monakana	RM/LM	(England)	Enfield	5 November 1993 (age 32)	47	6	–	–	30 May 2012	Arsenal	Free	30 June 2014
18	Andrew Procter	CM	(England)	Blackburn	13 June 1983 (aged 29)	19	0	–	–	20 January 202	Accrington Stanley	£75,000	30 June 2014
19	John Welsh	CM/RM	(England)	Liverpool	10 January 1984 (age 42)	–	–	–	–	14 May 2012	Tranmere Rovers	Free	30 June 2014
21	John Mousinho	CM	(England)	Isleworth	30 April 1986 (age 40)	–	–	–	–	29 May 2012	Stevenage	Free	30 June 2014
22	Jack King	AM/CF/CB	(England)	Oxford	20 August 1985 (age 40)	–	–	–	–	31 May 2012	Woking	Free	30 June 2014
24	Will Hayhurst	LM/RM	(Republic of Ireland)	Longbridge	24 February 1994 (age 32)	1	0	–	–	1 January 2012	Academy	Trainee	30 June 2013
Forwards
9	Graham Cummins	CF	(Northern Ireland)	Cork	29 December 1987 (age 38)	14	2	–	–	31 January 2012	Cork City	£84,000	30 June 2014
14	Joe Garner	CF/RW	(England)	Blackburn	12 April 1988 (age 38)	–	–	–	–	8 January 2013	Watford	Free	30 June 2014
20	Chris Beardsley	CF	(England)	Derby	28 February 1984 (age 42)	–	–	–	–	1 August 2012	Stevenage	Free	30 June 2014
29	Stuart Beavon	CF/RW/AM	(England)	Reading	5 May 1984 (age 42)	–	–	–	–	31 August 2012	Wycombe Wanderers	Undisclosed	30 June 2014
—	Iain Hume	CF/RW/AM	(Canada)	Edinburgh	30 October 1983 (age 42)	60	22	38	6	14 September 2010	Barnsley	£880,000	30 June 2014

== Season statistics ==
=== Starts and goals ===
As of 16 July 2013

No.	Pos	Nat	Player	Total		League One		FA Cup		League Cup		League Trophy	
No.	Pos	Nat	Player	Apps	Goals	Apps	Goals	Apps	Goals	Apps	Goals	Apps	Goals
1	GK	(Germany) GER	Thorsten Stuckmann	25	0	22	0	1	0	1	0	1	0
2	DF	(Republic of Ireland) IRL	Keith Keane	31	1	22+4	1	1	0	2	0	2	0
3	DF	(England) ENG	Scott Laird	24	4	19	4	1	0	3	0	1	0
4	DF	(England) ENG	Paul Huntington	44	4	34+3	3	3	0	3	0	1	1
5	DF	(Scotland) SCO	Chris Robertson	28	1	16+5	0	3	1	0+1	0	2+1	0
6	DF	(Australia) AUS	Shane Cansdell-Sherriff	22	1	14+1	1	3	0	2	0	2	0
8	MF	(England) ENG	Nicky Wroe	47	11	36+2	8	3	0	3	3	2+1	0
9	FW	(Republic of Ireland) IRL	Graham Cummins	23	3	5+13	2	0+1	0	0+1	0	3	1
11	MF	(England) ENG	Lee Holmes	33	3	23+5	3	1+1	0	1	0	2	0
13	MF	(England) ENG	Joel Byrom	26	3	12+9	2	1+1	1	1	0	2	0
14	FW	(England) ENG	Joe Garner	15	0	9+5	0	0	0	0	0	1	0
15	DF	(England) ENG	Paul Connolly (on loan from Leeds United)	15	0	14+1	0	0	0	0	0	0	0
16	DF	(England) ENG	David Buchanan	38	0	27+6	0	1	0	0+2	0	2	0
17	MF	(England) ENG	Jeffrey Monakana	46	6	23+15	4	2	1	3	1	0+3	0
18	MF	(England) ENG	Andrew Procter	23	1	6+9	0	0+2	0	1+1	0	3+1	1
19	MF	(England) ENG	John Welsh	42	1	32+4	1	2	0	1+1	0	2	0
20	FW	(England) ENG	Chris Beardsley	22	2	12+7	1	0	0	1+1	0	1	1
21	MF	(England) ENG	John Mousinho	29	1	17+7	1	2	0	2	0	1	0
22	MF	(England) ENG	Jack King	45	7	33+3	4	2+1	0	2	2	3+1	1
23	GK	(England) ENG	Declan Rudd (on loan from Norwich City)	14	0	14	0	0	0	0	0	0	0
24	MF	(Republic of Ireland) IRL	Will Hayhurst	25	4	18+3	4	0	0	1+1	0	2	0
26	DF	(Australia) AUS	Bailey Wright	41	2	37+1	2	0	0	1	0	2	0
27	DF	(England) ENG	Luke Foster	8	1	3+3	0	0	0	0	0	2	1
28	DF	(England) ENG	Ben Davies	3	0	3	0	0	0	0	0	0	0
29	FW	(England) ENG	Stuart Beavon	37	9	30+1	6	3	1	1	0	2	2
Players who have left the club:
7	FW	(England) ENG	David Amoo	23	1	6+11	0	0+2	1	1+1	0	2	0
10	FW	(England) ENG	Lee Trundle	2	0	0+1	0	0+1	0	0	0	0	0
12	FW	(England) ENG	Akpo Sodje	17	7	5+9	4	0	0	1	1	0+2	2
14	DF	(England) ENG	Todd Kane (on loan from Chelsea)	5	0	3	0	2	0	0	0	0	0
15	FW	(England) ENG	Chris Holroyd	0	0	0	0	0	0	0	0	0	0
23	GK	(England) ENG	Steve Simonsen	17	0	10	0	2	0	2	0	3	0
37	FW	(England) ENG	Anthony Elding (on loan from Grimsby Town)	5	0	2+3	0	0	0	0	0	0	0

=== Goalscorers record ===
Place	Position	Nation	Number	Name	League One	FA Cup	League Cup	FL Trophy	Total
1	MF	(England)	8	Nicky Wroe	8	0	3	0	11
2	FW	(England)	29	Stuart Beavon	6	1	0	2	9
3	FW	(England)	~~12~~	Akpo Sodje	4	0	1	2	7
3	MF	(England)	22	Jack King	4	0	2	1	7
5	MF	(England)	17	Jeffrey Monakana	4	1	1	0	6
6	DF	(England)	3	Scott Laird	4	0	0	0	4
6	DF	(England)	4	Paul Huntington	3	0	0	1	4
6	MF	(Republic of Ireland)	24	Will Hayhurst	4	0	0	0	4
9	FW	(Republic of Ireland)	9	Graham Cummins	2	0	0	1	3
9	MF	(England)	11	Lee Holmes	3	0	0	0	3
9	MF	(England)	13	Joel Byrom	2	1	0	0	3
9	Own Goals				3	0	0	0	3
13	FW	(England)	20	Chris Beardsley	1	0	0	1	2
13	DF	(Australia)	26	Bailey Wright	2	0	0	0	2
15	DF	(Republic of Ireland)	2	Keith Keane	1	0	0	0	1
15	DF	(Scotland)	5	Chris Robertson	0	1	0	0	1
15	DF	(Australia)	6	Shane Cansdell-Sherriff	1	0	0	0	1
15	FW	(England)	7	David Amoo	0	1	0	0	1
15	MF	(England)	18	Andrew Procter	0	0	0	1	1
15	MF	(England)	19	John Welsh	1	0	0	0	1
15	MF	(England)	21	John Mousinho	1	0	0	0	1
15	DF	(England)	27	Luke Foster	0	0	0	1	1
				TOTALS	52	5	7	10	74

=== Disciplinary record ===
Number	Nation	Position	Name	League One		FA Cup		League Cup		FL Trophy		Total	
Number	Nation	Position	Name	Booked	Sent off (straight red)	Booked	Sent off (straight red)	Booked	Sent off (straight red)	Booked	Sent off (straight red)	Booked	Sent off (straight red)
2	(Republic of Ireland)	DF	Keith Keane	9	0	1	0	0	0	1	0	11	0
3	(England)	DF	Scott Laird	1	0	0	0	0	0	0	0	1	0
4	(England)	DF	Paul Huntington	5	0	1	0	2	0	0	0	8	0
5	(Scotland)	DF	Chris Robertson	6	0	0	0	0	0	0	0	6	0
6	(Australia)	DF	Shane Cansdell-Sherriff	3	0	1	0	0	0	1	0	5	0
~~7~~	(England)	FW	David Amoo	0	0	0	0	0	0	1	0	1	0
8	(England)	MF	Nicky Wroe	1	0	0	0	1	0	1	0	3	0
9	(Republic of Ireland)	FW	Graham Cummins	3	0	0	0	0	0	0	0	3	0
11	(England)	MF	Lee Holmes	2	0	1	0	0	0	1	0	4	0
~~12~~	(England)	FW	Akpo Sodje	1	0	0	0	1	0	1	0	3	0
13	(England)	MF	Joel Byrom	2	0	0	0	0	0	0	0	2	0
~~14~~	(England)	DF	Todd Kane	2	0	0	0	0	0	0	0	2	0
14	(England)	FW	Joe Garner	1	0	0	0	0	0	1	0	2	0
15	(England)	DF	Paul Connolly	4	0	0	0	0	0	0	0	4	0
16	(England)	DF	David Buchanan	1	0	0	0	1	0	0	0	2	0
17	(England)	MF	Jeffrey Monakana	7	0	1	0	0	0	0	0	8	0
18	(England)	MF	Andrew Procter	2	0	0	0	0	0	1	0	3	0
19	(England)	MF	John Welsh	8	0	0	0	0	0	1	0	9	0
20	(England)	FW	Chris Beardsley	1	0	0	0	2	0	0	0	3	0
21	(England)	MF	John Mousinho	4	0	0	0	0	0	0	0	4	0
22	(England)	MF	Jack King	5	0	0	0	0	0	1	0	6	0
24	(Northern Ireland)	MF	Will Hayhurst	1	0	0	0	0	0	0	0	1	0
26	(Australia)	DF	Bailey Wright	7	1	0	0	0	0	0	0	7	0
27	(England)	DF	Luke Foster	1	0	0	0	0	0	0	0	1	0
28	(England)	DF	Ben Davies	3	0	0	0	0	0	0	0	3	0
29	(England)	FW	Stuart Beavon	2	0	0	0	0	0	0	0	2	0
			TOTALS	82	1	5	0	7	0	7	0	101	1

== Transfers ==
=== In ===
No.	Pos.	Nat.	Name	Age	EU	Moving from	Type	Transfer window	Ends	Transfer fee	Source
19	MF	(England)	John Welsh	28	EU	Tranmere Rovers	Free	Summer	2014	Free	
6	DF	(Australia)	Shane Cansdell-Sherriff	29	EU	Shrewsbury Town	Free	Summer	2014	Free	
8	MF	(England)	Nicky Wroe	26	EU	Shrewsbury Town	Free	Summer	2014	Free	
4	DF	(England)	Paul Huntington	24	EU	Yeovil Town	Free	Summer	2014	Free	
7	FW	(England)	David Amoo	21	EU	Liverpool	Free	Summer	2013	Free	
16	DF	(Northern Ireland) (England)	David Buchanan	26	EU	Tranmere Rovers	Free	Summer	2014	Free	
N/A	GK	(England)	Ricard Wright	34	EU	Ipswich Town	Free	Summer	2013	Free	
3	DF	(England)	Scott Laird	24	EU	Stevenage	Free	Summer	2014	Free	
11	MF	(England)	Lee Holmes	25	EU	Southampton	Free	Summer	2014	Free	
17	MF	(England)	Jeffrey Monakana	18	EU	Arsenal	Free	Summer	2013	Free	
21	MF	(England)	John Mousinho	26	EU	Stevenage	Free	Summer	2014	Free	
2	MF	(Republic of Ireland)	Keith Keane	25	EU	Luton Town	Free	Summer	2014	Free	
10	FW	(England)	Lee Trundle	35	EU	Neath (Wales)	Free	Summer	2013	Free	
20	FW	(England)	Chris Beardsley	28	EU	Stevenage	Free	Summer	Undisclosed	Free	
13	MF	(England)	Joel Byrom	25	EU	Stevenage	Free	Summer	Undisclosed	Free	
23	GK	(England)	Steve Simonsen	33	EU	Sheffield United	Free	Summer	2013	Free	
12	FW	(England)	Akpo Sodje	32	EU	Free agent	Free	Summer	2013	Free	
29	FW	(England)	Stuart Beavon	28	EU	Wycombe Wanderers	Transfer	Summer	2014	Undisclosed	
14	FW	(England)	Joe Garner	24	EU	Watford	Free transfer	Winter	2014	Free	
35	GK	(Wales)	Rhys Taylor	22	EU	Chelsea	Free transfer	Winter	Non-contract	Free	

=== Loans in ===
No.	Pos.	Name	Country	Age	Loan club	Started	Ended	Start source	End source
37	FW	Anthony Elding	(England)	30	Grimsby Town	15 November	7 January		
14	DF	Todd Kane	(England)	19	Chelsea	5 December	7 January		
15	DF	Paul Connolly	(England)	42	Leeds United	15 January	30 May		
23	GK	Declan Rudd	(England)	35	Norwich City	29 January	30 May		

Sources: For loan start source see "Start source". For loan end source see "End source".
EU = if holds or not a European Union passport; Country: when 2 flags, 1st flag = country that plays for internationally, 2nd flag = country of birth; No. = number on jersey; P = Position (for position name, pause mouse pointer on abbreviation); Name = Name on jersey (for more extensive name, pause mouse pointer on name); In/Out = In: The player came in on loan, Out: The player went out on loan; Loan club = the club that the player moved on loan to or the club that the player came from on loan; Started = the date when the player's loan started; Ended = the date when the player's loan ended.

=== Out ===
No.	Pos.	Name	Country	Age	Type	Moving to	Transfer window	Transfer fee	Apps	Goals	Source
22	MF	Graham Alexander	(Scotland) (England)	40	Contract ended	Retired	Summer	N/A	422	113	
33	FW	Neil Mellor	(England)	29	Contract ended	Retired	Summer	N/A	149	20	
4	MF	Ian Ashbee	(England)	35	Contract ended	Free agent	Summer	N/A	31	0	
25	GK	Andreas Arestidou	(England)	22	Contract ended	Morecambe	Summer	N/A	9	0	
50	DF	Aaron Brown	(England)	28	Contract ended	Floriana (Malta)	Summer	N/A	4	0	
24	MF	Seanan Clucas	(Northern Ireland)	19	Contract ended	Bristol Rovers	Summer	N/A	1	0	
18	DF	Daniel Devine	(Northern Ireland)	19	Contract ended	Fleetwood Town	Summer	N/A	16	1	
27	FW	Jamie Douglas	(Northern Ireland)	19	Contract ended	Dungannon Swifts (Northern Ireland)	Summer	N/A	7	1	
2	DF	David Gray	(Scotland)	24	Contract ended	Stevenage	Summer	N/A	52	0	
42	DF	Nicky Hunt	(England)	28	Contract ended	Rotherham United	Summer	N/A	16	1	
23	DF	Scott Leather	(England)	19	Contract ended	Altrincham	Summer	N/A	2	0	
28	MF	George Miller	(England)	20	Contract ended	Accrington Stanley	Summer	N/A	8	0	
21	GK	Iain Turner	(Scotland)	28	Contract ended	Free agent	Summer	N/A	29	1	
12	DF	Brian McLean	(Scotland)	27	Contract ended	Dundee United (Scotland)	Summer	Free	18	2	
11	FW	Juvhel Tsoumou	(Germany) (Democratic Republic of the Congo)	21	Contract terminated	Free agent	Summer	Free	22	4	
36	DF	Luke Clark	(England)	18	Contract ended	Accrington Stanley	Summer	Free	4	0	
N/A	GK	Richard Wright	(England)	34	Contract terminated	Manchester City	Summer	Free	0	0	
17	MF	Paul Parry	(Wales)	31	Contract ended	Shrewsbury Town	Summer	Free	91	6	
10	MF	Barry Nicholson	(Scotland)	33	Free transfer	Fleetwood Town	Summer	Free	101	10	
20	MF	Darel Russell	(England)	31	Contract terminated	Portsmouth	Summer	Free	32	1	
8	MF	Paul Coutts	(Scotland)	23	Transfer	Derby County	Summer	Undisclosed	85	5	
3	DF	Conor McLaughlin	(Northern Ireland)	20	Free transfer	Fleetwood Town	Summer	Free	28	0	
15	MF	Adam Barton	(Republic of Ireland) (England)	21	Transfer	Coventry City	Summer	Undisclosed	57	3	
16	MF	Danny Mayor	(England)	21	Transfer	Sheffield Wednesday	Summer	Undisclosed	76	3	
9	FW	Proctor	(England)	20	Transfer	Swansea City (Wales)	Summer	Undisclosed	38	4	
6	DF	Craig Morgan	(Wales)	27	Contract ended	Rotherham United	Summer	Free	58	3	
12	FW	Akpo Sodje	(England)	32	Contract ended	Scunthorpe United		Free	17	7	
15	FW	Chris Holroyd	(England)	26	Contract terminated	Morecambe	Winter	Free	19	1	
7	FW	David Amoo	(England)	21	Contract terminated	Tranmere Rovers	Winter	Free	22	1	
23	GK	Steve Simonsen	(England)	33	Contract terminated	Dundee (Scotland)	Winter	Free	17	0	
10	FW	Lee Trundle	(England)	36	Contract terminated	Chester		Free	2	0	

EU = if holds or not a European Union passport; Country: when 2 flags, 1st flag = country that plays for internationally, 2nd flag = country of birth; N = number on jersey; P = Position (for position name, pause mouse pointer on abbreviation); Name = Name on jersey (for more extensive name, pause mouse pointer on name); Age = age on the day of the signing; Moving from = only indicate the club the player was playing before start playing for this club in this season, for the type of the moving see Status column; Moving to = only indicates the club the player is going to play next, for the type of the moving see Status column; Ends = when the player's current contract ends; n/a = Not applicable; Apps = Total number of competitive appearances (including substitute appearances) at the club prior to departure; Goals = Total number of competitive goals scored at the club prior to departure.

=== Loans out ===
No.	Pos.	Name	Country	Age	Loan club	Started	Ended	Start source	End source
15	FW	Chris Holroyd	(England)	26	Macclesfield Town	25 August	7 January		
	FW	Iain Hume	(Canada) (Scotland)	42	Doncaster Rovers	31 August	30 May		
6	DF	Shane Cansdell-Sherriff	(Australia)	43	Rochdale	30 January	30 May		

Sources: For loan start source see "Start source". For loan end source see "End source".
EU = if holds or not a European Union passport; Country: when 2 flags, 1st flag = country that plays for internationally, 2nd flag = country of birth; No. = number on jersey; P = Position (for position name, pause mouse pointer on abbreviation); Name = Name on jersey (for more extensive name, pause mouse pointer on name); In/Out = In: The player came in on loan, Out: The player went out on loan; Loan club = the club that the player moved on loan to or the club that the player came from on loan; Started = the date when the player's loan started; Ended = the date when the player's loan ended.

== Results ==
=== Pre-season friendlies ===
14 July 2012	Southport	0–2	Preston North End	Southport
15:00			Akrigg 5' (og); Byrom 12' (pen)	Stadium: Haig Avenue; Attendance: 1,916; Referee: Mr I Hussain

17 July 2012	Chorley	1–1	Preston North End	Chorley
19:45	Kilheeney 44'	Report	Trundle 27'	Stadium: Victory Park

21 July 2012	Morecambe	2–0	Preston North End	Morecambe
15:00	Burrow 49'; Carlton 86'	Report		Stadium: Globe Arena; Attendance: 1,731; Referee: T. Harrington

28 July 2012	Preston North End	1–0	AEK Athens	Preston
15:00	Monakana 88'			Stadium: Deepdale

31 July 2012	AFC Wimbledon	1–4	Preston North End	Kingsmeadow
19:45	Jolley 21'	Report	Byrom 12' 53'; Sodje 18' 24'	Attendance: 782

4 August 2012	Preston North End	1–3	Leeds United	Preston
19:00 BST	Mousinho 57'	Report	Lees 31'; Byram 66'; White 80'	Stadium: Deepdale

=== League One ===
18 August 2012 1	Preston North End	0–0	Colchester United	Preston
15:00				Stadium: Deepdale; Attendance: 10,034; Referee: Philip Gibbs

21 August 2012 2	Shrewsbury Town	1–0	Preston North End	Shrewsbury
19:45	Parry 4'			Stadium: New Meadow; Attendance: 6,444; Referee: Mathieson

25 August 2012 3	Bournemouth	1–1	Preston North End	Bournemouth
15:00	Elphick 52'		76' Sodje	Stadium: Dean Court; Attendance: 5,329; Referee: Carl Berry

2 September 2012 4	Preston North End	4–1	Swindon Town	Preston
14:00	Sodje 5'; Wroe 10'; Beavon 43'; Welsh 68'		58' De Vita	Stadium: Deepdale; Attendance: 10,372; Referee: Bobby Madley

8 September 2012 5	Bury	1–2	Preston North End	Bury
15:00	Skarz 90'		30' Sodje; 66' Cansdell-Sherriff	Stadium: Gigg Lane; Attendance: 5,213; Referee: Drysdale

15 September 2012 6	Preston North End	1–2	Crawley Town	Preston
15:00	Huntington 90+1'		54', 68' Alexander	Stadium: Deepdale; Attendance: 9,812; Referee: Webb

18 September 2012 7	Preston North End	5–0	Hartlepool United	Preston
19:45	Byrom 28'; Beavon 29'; King 65'; Laird 84', 87'			Stadium: Deepdale; Attendance: 8,132; Referee: Bates

22 September 2012 8	Walsall	3–1	Preston North End	Walsall
15:00	Baxendale 38'; Bowerman 55' (pen), 58'		10' Byrom	Stadium: Bescot Stadium; Attendance: 4,189; Referee: Collins

29 September 2012 9	Preston North End	3–2	Yeovil Town	Preston
15:00	Monakana 57'; Beardsley 64'; Burn 86' (og)		6' Williams; (yellow card) 76' (yellow-red card) Upson; 87' Burn	Stadium: Deepdale; Attendance: 8,520; Referee: Brown

2 October 2012 10	Doncaster Rovers	1–3	Preston North End	Doncaster
19:45	Cotterill 45'		33' King; 60' Laird; 71' Beavon	Stadium: Keepmoat Stadium; Attendance: 5,681; Referee: Whitestone

8 October 2012 11	Oldham Athletic	3–1	Preston North Edn	Oldham
15:00	Baxter 27'; Montaño 57'; Furman 69'		90+4' Sodje	Stadium: Boundary Park; Attendance: 5,496; Referee: Tierney

14 October 2012 12	Preston North End	0–0	Milton Keynes Dons	Preston
13:30				Stadium: Deepdale; Attendance: 8,327; Referee: Pawson

20 October 2012 13	Preston North End	0–1	Sheffield United	Preston
15:00			43' Kitson	Stadium: Deepdale; Attendance: 11,536; Referee: Sarginson

23 October 2012 14	Scunthorpe United	2–3	Preston North End	Scunthorpe
19:45	Clarke 42'; Hawley 72'		1', 28', 36' Wroe	Stadium: Glanford Park; Attendance: 2,671; Referee: Naylor

27 October 2012 15	Tranmere Rovers	1–1	Preston North End	Tranmere
15:00	Cassidy 85'		50' Huntington	Stadium: Prenton Park; Attendance: 7,732; Referee: Phil Gibbs

6 November 2012 16	Preston North End	1–1	Carlisle United	Preston
19:45	Cummins 90'		31' (pen) Garner	Stadium: Deepdale; Attendance: 9,249; Referee: Clarke

10 November 2012 17	Stevenage	1–4	Preston North End	Stevenage
15:00	Tansey 15'		6' Beavon; 32' King; 58' Monakana; 72' Wroe	Stadium: Broadhall Way; Attendance: 3,740

17 November 2012 18	Preston North End	1–1	Brentford	Preston
15:00	Laird 62'		89' German	Stadium: Deepdale; Attendance: 8,804

20 November 2012 19	Preston North End	0–0	Notts County	Preston
19:45			(red card) 90+4' Campbell-Ryce	Stadium: Deepdale; Attendance: 8,013

24 November 2012 20	Leyton Orient	2–0	Preston North End	London
15:00	Braudy 43'; Lisbie 61'			Stadium: Brisbane Road; Attendance: 4,190

8 December 2012 21	Preston North End	1–3	Crewe Alexandra	Preston
15:00	Huntington 89'		32' Murphy; 49' Inman; 52' Pogba	Stadium: Deepdale; Attendance: 8,542

15 December 2012 22	Portsmouth	0–0	Preston North End	Portsmouth
15:00				Stadium: Fratton Park; Attendance: 12,376

22 December 2012 23	Coventry City	1–1	Preston North End	Coventry
15:00	Bailey 22'		77' Holmes	Stadium: Ricoh Arena; Attendance: 12,230

26 December 2012 24	Preston North End	0–0	Bury	Preston
15:00				Stadium: Deepdale; Attendance: 12,014

29 December 2012 25	Preston North End	0–3	Doncaster Rovers	Preston
15:00			1' Syers; 30' Cotterill; 76' (pen) Paynter	Stadium: Deepdale; Attendance: 9,626

1 January 2013 26	Hartlepool United	0–1	Preston North End	Hartlepool
15:00			45' Moushino	Stadium: Victoria Park; Attendance: 3,829

13 January 2013 27	Preston North End	1–3	Walsall	Preston
19:45	Wright 90'		18' Brandy; 38' Downing; 56' Baxendale	Stadium: Deepdale; Attendance: 9,823

26 January 2013 28	Preston North End	2–2	Coventry City	Preston
15:00	Cummins 30'; Wroe 60'		38' Clarke; 53' (og) Robertson	Stadium: Deepdale; Attendance: 8,474

2 February 2013 29	Preston North End	1–2	Shrewsbury Town	Preston
15:00	Beavon 43'		64' Taylor; 90' (pen) Richards	Stadium: Deepdale; Attendance: 8,331

9 February 2013 30	Colchester United	1–0	Preston North End	Colchester
15:00	Sears 55'		(yellow card) 79' (yellow-red card) 83' Wright	Stadium: Colchester Community Stadium; Attendance: 3,215

12 February 2013 31	Yeovil Town	3–1	Preston North End	Yeovil
19:45	Hayter 73'; Ralph 80'; Madden 90'		30' Beardsley	Stadium: Huish Park; Attendance: 3,661

16 February 2013 32	Preston North End	2–0	Bournemouth	Preston
15:00	Beavon 19'; Wright 31'			Stadium: Deepdale; Attendance: 8,889

23 February 2013 33	Swindon Town	1–1	Preston North End	Swindon
15:00	Rooney 75'		51' Hayhurst	Stadium: County Ground; Attendance: 9,145

2 March 2013 34	Milton Keynes Dons	1–1	Preston North End	Milton Keynes
15:00	Chicksen 2'		7' Hayhurst	Stadium: stadium:mk Attendance: 8,412

9 March 2013 35	Preston North End	2–0	Stevenage	Preston
15:00	Holmes 6'; Hayhurst 16'			Stadium: Deepdale; Attendance: 9,000

12 March 2013 36	Notts County	0–1	Preston North End	Nottingham
19:45			34' (o.g.) Hollis	Stadium: Meadow Lane; Attendance: 3,587

16 March 2013 37	Brentford	1–0	Preston North End	London
15:00	Saunders 90+4' (pen.)			Stadium: Griffin Park; Attendance: 6,512

23 March 2013 38	Preston North End	0–0	Leyton Orient	Preston
15:00				Stadium: Deepdale; Attendance: 8,405

29 March 2013 39	Preston North End	1–1	Portsmouth	Preston
17:00	Keane 77'		3' Wallace	Stadium: Deepdale; Attendance: 9,464

1 April 2013 40	Crewe Alexandra	1–0	Preston North End	Crewe
15:00	Inman 32'			Stadium: Alexandra Stadium; Attendance: 6,366

6 April 2013 41	Preston North End	3–0	Scunthorpe United	Preston
15:00	Holmes 38'; Wroe 77'; King 90+3'			Stadium: Deepdale; Attendance: 8,118

9 April 2013 42	Preston North End	2–0	Oldham Athletic	Preston
19:45	Wroe 73' (pen.); Hayhurst 90+3'			Stadium: Deepdale; Attendance: 9,080

13 April 2013 43	Carlisle United	1–1	Preston North End	Birkenhead
15:00	Miller 38'		12' Monakana	Stadium: Prenton Park; Attendance: 5,965

20 April 2013 44	Preston North End	1–0	Tranmere Rovers	Preston
15:00	Monakana 45'			Stadium: Deepdale; Attendance: 10,467

23 April 2013 45	Crawley Town	1–0	Preston North End	Crawley
19:45	Jones 6'			Stadium: Broadfield Stadium; Attendance: 3,026

27 April 2013 46	Sheffield United	0–0	Preston North End	Sheffield
15:00				Stadium: Bramall Lane; Attendance: 19,888

=== FA Cup ===
3 November 2012 Round 1	Preston North End	3–0	Yeovil Town	Preston
15:00	Byrom 38'; Amoo 41'; Robertson 70'			Stadium: Deepdale; Attendance: 4,757; Referee: Haines

1 December 2012 Round 2	Preston North End	2–0	Gillingham	Preston
19:45	Monakana 12'; Beavon			Stadium: Deepdale; Attendance: 5,271

5 January 2013 Round 3	Millwall	1–0	Preston North End	London
15:00	Feeney 31'			Stadium: The Den; Attendance: 5,364

=== League Cup ===
13 August 2012 Round 1	Preston North End	2–0	Huddersfield Town	Preston
19:45	King 29'; Wroe 40'			Stadium: Deepdale; Attendance: 5,500; Referee: Lewis

28 August 2012 Round 2	Preston North End	4–1	Crystal Palace	Preston
19:45	Wroe 2', 63'; Sodje 18'; Monakana 41'		37' Wilbraham	Stadium: Deepdale; Attendance: 5,194; Referee: Ilderton

25 September 2012 Round 3	Preston North End	1–3	Middlesbrough	Preston
19:45	King 40'		13' Ledesma; 18' Zammama; 61' Smallwood	Stadium: Deepdale; Attendance: 4,959; Referee: Stroud

=== League Trophy ===
5 September 2012 Northern Section Round 1	Carlisle United	1–1 (a.e.t.) (1–3 p)	Preston North End	Carlisle
19:45	McGovern 68'; Noble (red card) 83'		3' Beardsley	Stadium: Brunton Park; Attendance: 3,471; Referee: Jeremy Simpson
	Penalties
	McGovern (penalty scored); Jervis (penalty missed); Berrett (penalty missed); Madden (penalty missed)		(penalty scored) Wroe; (penalty missed) Wright; (penalty scored) Sodje; (penalty scored) Buchanan

9 October 2012 Northern Section Round 2	Morecambe	2–4	Preston North End	Morecambe
19:45	Mustoe 21'; Brodie 78' (pen)		56' Cummins; 75', 90+4' Sodje; 81' Huntington	Stadium: Globe Arena; Attendance: 2,577; Referee: Mark Haywood

18 December 2012 Northern Section Quarter-Final	Bury	3–3 (5–4 p)	Preston North End	Bury
15:00	Skarz 62'; Doherty 84'; Schumacher 90'		25' King; 68' Procter; 90' Beavon	Stadium: Gigg Lane; Attendance: 2,023
	Penalties
	Schumacher (penalty scored); Doherty (penalty scored); Jones (penalty scored); Hughes (penalty scored); Wylde (penalty missed)		(penalty scored) Procter; (penalty scored) Byrom; (penalty scored) Beavon; (penalty scored) Mousinho; (penalty scored) Cummins

10 January 2013 North Section Semi-Final	Coventry City	3–2	Preston North End	Coventry
15:00	Jennings 41'; Baker 90+3'; Clarke 90+4'		67' Foster; 80' Beavon	Stadium: Ricoh Arena; Attendance: 12,655

== Overall ==
Games played	56 (46 League One, 3 League Cup, 3 FA Cup, 4 League Trophy)
Games won	21 (14 League One, 2 League Cup, 2 FA Cup, 3 League Trophy)
Games drawn	17 (17 League One, 0 League Cup, 0 FA Cup, 0 League Trophy)
Games lost	18 (15 League One, 1 League Cup, 1 FA Cup, 1 League Trophy)
Goals scored	74 (52 League One, 7 League Cup, 5 FA Cup, 10 League Trophy)
Goals conceded	60 (46 League One, 4 League Cup, 1 FA Cup, 9 League Trophy)
Goal difference	+14
Yellow cards	101 (82 League One, 7 League Cup, 5 FA Cup, 7 League Trophy)
Red cards	1 (1 League One, 0 League Cup, 0 FA Cup, 0 League Trophy)
Worst discipline	Keith Keane (11 (yellow card) 0 (red card) )
Best result	5–0 vs Hartlepool United (H)
Worst result	0–3 vs Doncaster Rovers (H)
Most appearances	Nicky Wroe (44 starts, 3 subs)
Top scorer	Nicky Wroe (11 goals)
Points	59
