= 2011–12 Preston North End F.C. season =

English football club season

Preston North End
2011–2012 season
- Chairman: Peter Ridsdale
- Manager: Graham Westley
- Stadium: Deepdale
- League One: 15th
- FA Cup: Third round
- League Cup: Third round
- Johnstone's Paint Trophy: Area final
- Top goalscorer: League: All: Iain Hume (10)
- Highest home attendance: 17,518 (vs. Carlisle United, 26 December 2011)
- Lowest home attendance: League: 9,148 (vs. Brentford, 27 March 2012); All: 5,401 (vs. Crewe Alexandra, 9 August 2011)
- Average home league attendance: 11,820
Home colours	Away colours	Third colours

The 2011–12 season was Preston North End's 123rd year in The Football League and their first outside the second tier of English football in a decade, after they were relegated from the Championship the previous season.

== Player info ==
No.	Name	Nat.	Place of birth	Date of birth	Club apps.	Club goals	Int. caps	Int. goals	Previous club	Date joined	Fee
1	Thorsten Stuckmann	GER	Gütersloh	17 March 1981	–	–	–	–	Free agent	7 November 2011	Free
2	David Gray	SCO	Edinburgh	4 May 1988	24	–	–	–	Manchester United	16 July 2010	Free
3	Conor McLaughlin	NIR	Belfast	26 July 1991	9	–	–	–	N/A	1 June 2010	Trainee
4	Ian Ashbee	ENG	Birmingham	6 September 1976	19	–	–	–	Hull City	31 January 2011	Free
5	Chris Robertson	SCO	Dundee	11 October 1986	–	–	–	–	Torquay United	31 January 2012	Undisclosed
6	Craig Morgan	WAL	St Asaph	16 June 1985	34	2	22	–	Peterborough United	6 July 2010	£400,000
7	Iain Hume	CAN	Edinburgh (SCO)	30 October 1983	29	12	29	2	Barnsley	31 December 2010	Undisclosed
8	Paul Coutts	SCO	Aberdeen	22 July 1988	40	3	–	–	Peterborough United	1 February 2010	Free
9	Jamie Proctor	ENG	Preston	25 March 1992	5	1	–	–	N/A	1 June 2010	Trainee
10	Barry Nicholson	SCO	Dumfries	24 August 1978	69	8	3	–	Aberdeen	30 June 2008	Free
11	Juvhel Tsoumou	GER	Brazzaville (COG)	27 December 1990	–	–	–	–	Alemannia Aachen	10 August 2011	Free
12	Brian McLean	NIR	Rutherglen (SCO)	28 February 1985	–	–	–	–	Falkirk	16 July 2010	Free
14	Will Hayhurst	IRE	Blackburn	24 February 1994	–	–	–	–	N/A	4 May 2012	Trainee
15	Adam Barton	IRL	Blackburn (ENG)	7 January 1991	36	1	1	–	N/A	1 July 2008	Trainee
16	Danny Mayor	ENG	Leyland	18 October 1990	33	0	–	–	N/A	1 July 2008	Trainee
17	Paul Parry	WAL	Chepstow	19 August 1980	44	2	12	1	Cardiff City	3 August 2009	£300,000
18	Daniel Devine	NIR	Belfast	7 September 1992	2	0	–	–	N/A	1 June 2010	Trainee
19	Keammar Daley	JAM	Kingston	18 February 1988	–	–	–	–	Free agent	31 August 2011	Free
20	Darel Russell	ENG	Mile End	22 October 1980	28	0	–	–	Norwich City	4 August 2010	Free
21	Iain Turner	SCO	Stirling	26 January 1984	17	0	–	–	Everton	29 July 2011	Free
22	Graham Alexander	SCO	Coventry (ENG)	10 October 1971	400	111	40	–	Burnley	3 August 2011	Free
23	Scott Leather	ENG	Manchester	30 September 1992	2	0	–	–	N/A	1 June 2010	Trainee
24	Seanan Clucas	NIR	Dungannon	8 November 1992	–	–	–	–	N/A	1 June 2011	Trainee
25	Andreas Arestidou	ENG	Morecambe	6 December 1989	–	–	–	–	Shrewsbury Town	15 July 2010	Free
26	Bailey Wright	AUS	Melbourne	28 July 1992	3	0	–	–	VIS	1 July 2010	Free
27	Jamie Douglas	NIR	Unknown	4 July 1992	3	0	–	–	N/A	1 July 2010	Trainee
28	George Miller	ENG	Unknown	25 November 1991	1	0	–	–	N/A	1 July 2010	Trainee
29	Doyle Middleton	ENG	Sefton	11 April 1994	3	0	–	–	N/A	1 June 2010	Trainee
33	Neil Mellor	ENG	Sheffield	4 November 1982	129	34	–	–	Liverpool	30 August 2006	£500,000
34	Rhys Murphy	ENG	Shoreham-by-Sea	6 November 1990	–	–	–	–	Arsenal	30 January 2012	Loan
35	Max Ehmer	GER	Frankfurt am Main	2 February 1992	–	–	–	–	Queens Park Rangers	15 March 2012	Loan
35	Jamie McAllister	SCO	Glasgow	26 April 1978	–	–	–	–	Bristol City	20 January 2012	Loan
36	Luke Clark	ENG	Preston	24 May 1994	–	–	–	–	N/A	4 May 2012	Trainee
37	Chris Holroyd	ENG	Nantwich	24 October 1986	–	–	–	–	Rotherham United	20 January 2012	Undisclosed
38	Andrew Procter	ENG	Blackburn	13 June 1983	–	–	–	–	Accrington Stanley	20 January 2012	£75,000
39	Graham Cummins	IRL	Cork	29 December 1987	–	–	–	–	Cork City	31 January 2012	£84,000
40	Brandon Zibaka	ENG	Camden	20 May 1995	–	–	–	–	Trainee	13 September 2011	N/A
42	Nicky Hunt	ENG	Westhoughton	3 September 1983	–	–	–	–	Free agent	4 February 2012	Free
44	Chuks Aneke	ENG	London	3 July 1993	–	–	–	–	Arsenal	22 March 2012	Loan
50	Aaron Brown	ENG	Wolverhampton	23 June 1983	–	–	–	–	Free agent	4 February 2012	Free

== League One data ==
=== League table ===
Pos	Team	Pld	W	D	L	GF	GA	GD	Pts
13	Hartlepool United	46	14	14	18	50	55	−5	56
14	Bury	46	15	11	20	60	79	−19	56
15	Preston North End	46	13	15	18	54	68	−14	54
16	Oldham Athletic	46	14	12	20	50	66	−16	54
17	Yeovil Town	46	14	12	20	59	80	−21	54

Updated to match(es) played on 5 May 2012. Source: BBC Sport
Rules for classification: 1) Points; 2) Goal difference; 3) Number of goals scored

=== Results summary ===
Overall								Home						Away					
Pld	W	D	L	GF	GA	GD	Pts	W	D	L	GF	GA	GD	W	D	L	GF	GA	GD
46	13	15	18	54	68	−14	54	7	9	7	30	35	−5	6	6	11	24	33	−9

Last updated: 5 May 2012.
Source: PNEFC League One Results

== Results ==
=== Preseason friendlies ===
9 July 2011 Jack Kirkland Trophy	Chorley	0–2	Preston North End	The Chorley Nissan Victory Park Stadium
15:00			Hume 17'; Proctor 71'	Attendance: 1,502

10 July 2011	Bamber Bridge	1–2	Preston North End	QED Stadium
15:00	Mayers 28'		McLaughlin 36'; Proctor 42'	Attendance: 1,650

13 July 2011	Fleetwood Town	0–4	Preston North End	Highbury Stadium
19:30			Nicholson 42'; Proctor 59', 63'; Carter 70'	Attendance: 1,656

16 July 2011	Falkirk	2–2	Preston North End	Falkirk Stadium
15:00	Alston 1'; Flynn 66'		Proctor 82' (pen.); McLaughlin 88'	Attendance: 901

18 July 2011	Kilmarnock	1–1	Preston North End	Rugby Park
19:30	Dayton 1'		Mellor 50'	Attendance: 1,743

27 July 2011	Morecambe	0–3	Preston North End	Globe Arena
19:45			Daley 33'; Proctor 48'; Miller 80'

31 July 2011	Preston North End	1–3	Wigan Athletic	Deepdale
15:00	Linganzi 27'		McCarthy 1'; Moses 8'; Boyce 30'

=== League One ===
6 August 2011 1	Preston North End	2–4	Colchester United	Deepdale
15:00	Mellor 60'; Coutts 70'		Wordsworth 12'; Henderson 49', 65'; Odejayi 76'	Attendance: 11,451

13 August 2011 2	Scunthorpe United	1–1	Preston North End	Glanford Park
15:00	Barcham 87'		Hume 13'	Attendance: 4,675

16 August 2011 3	Chesterfield	0–2	Preston North End	B2net Stadium
19:45			Carlisle 17'; Nicholson 70'	Attendance: 6,706

20 August 2011 4	Preston North End	1–0	Exeter City	Deepdale
15:00	Proctor 41'			Attendance: 10,655

27 August 2011 5	Preston North End	2–0	Notts County	Deepdale
15:00	McLean 83'; Turner 86'			Attendance: 10,759

9 September 2011 6	Preston North End	4–3	Yeovil Town	Deepdale
19:45	Proctor 5'; Nicholson 49'; Mellor 59', 70'		Edgar 31'; MacLean 64', 81' (pen.)	Attendance: 11,474

17 September 2011 7	Brentford	1–3	Preston North End	Griffin Park
15:00	McGinn 21'		Mellor 10', 73'; Hume 32'	Attendance: 6,090

24 September 2011 8	Preston North End	2–1	Tranmere Rovers	Deepdale
15:00	Alexander 37' (pen.); Mayor 71'		Baxter 60'	Attendance: 17,281

27 September 2011 9	Wycombe Wanderers	3–4	Preston North End	Adams Park
19:45	Ainsworth 12'; Donnelly 14' (pen.); Beavon 27'		Mellor 7', 73'; Hume 9', 64'	Attendance: 3,734

1 October 2011 10	Leyton Orient	2–1	Preston North End	Matchroom Stadium
15:00	Cox 36', 45+1'		Coutts 2'	Attendance: 4,384

15 October 2011 11	Walsall	1–0	Preston North End	Bescot Stadium
15:00	Nicholls 10'			Attendance: 4,834

19 October 2011 12	Preston North End	2–4	Sheffield United	Deepdale
19:45	Carlisle 29'; Hume 63'		Phillips 4', 39'; Williamson 74', 87'	Attendance: 11,520

22 October 2011 13	Huddersfield Town	3–1	Preston North End	Galpharm Stadium
15:00	Rhodes 4', 42', 57'		Tsoumou 61'	Attendance: 16,804

25 October 2011 14	Preston North End	3–3	Oldham Athletic	Deepdale
19:45	Tsoumou 28'; Proctor 32'; Devine 64'		Kuqi 41'; Wesolowski 44', 86'	Attendance: 11,370

29 October 2011 15	Preston North End	1–3	Bournemouth	Deepdale
15:00	Tsoumou 29'		Thomas 48'; Malone 57'; Pugh 68'	Attendance: 10,185

5 November 2011 16	Charlton Athletic	5–2	Preston North End	The Valley
15:00	Jackson 16', 26' (pen.); Morrison 22'; Wright-Phillips 38'; Hollands 69'		Morgan 85'; Daley 90+1'	Attendance: 17,486

19 November 2011 17	Preston North End	0–1	Rochdale	Deepdale
15:00			Adams 84'	Attendance: 10,456

26 November 2011 18	Bury	1–0	Preston North End	Gigg Lane
15:00	Amoo 15'			Attendance: 4,957

29 November 2011 19	Hartlepool United	0–1	Preston North End	Bescot Stadium
19:45			Mellor 22'	Attendance: 4,156

10 December 2011 20	Preston North End	0–0	Stevenage	Deepdale
15:00				Attendance: 9,425

17 December 2011 21	Milton Keynes Dons	0–1	Preston North End	Stadium:mk
17:20			Parry 7'	Attendance: 8,009

26 December 2011 22	Preston North End	3–3	Carlisle United	Deepdale
13:30	Hume 22'; Parry 31' (pen.); Douglas 90+2'		Miller 20'; Zoko 45+6'; Berrett 62'	Attendance: 17,518

31 December 2011 23	Preston North End	0–2	Sheffield Wednesday	Deepdale
13:00			Batth 4'; Marshall 42'	Attendance: 15,904

2 January 2012 24	Rochdale	1–1	Preston North End	Spotland
13:00	Bogdanović 25'		Jervis 17'	Attendance: 4,570

14 January 2012 25	Preston North End	3–2	Wycombe Wanderers	Deepdale
15:00	Bunn 40'; Jervis 58'; Parry 62' (pen.)		Trotta 8', 89'	Attendance: 10,142

21 January 2012 26	Preston North End	0–2	Leyton Orient	Deepdale
15:00			Laird 67'; Smith 80'	Attendance: 11,436

24 January 2012 27	Notts County	0–0	Preston North End	Meadow Lane
19:45				Attendance: 4,901

28 January 2012 28	Yeovil Town	2–1	Preston North End	Huish Park
15:00	A Williams 30', 62'; (red card) 88' Huntington		Morgan (red card) 3'; Carlisle 74'	Attendance: 4,245

14 February 2012 29	Preston North End	1–0	Hartlepool United	Deepdale
19:45	Mayor 76'			Attendance: 14,191

18 February 2012 30	Sheffield United	2–1	Preston North End	Brammall Lane
15:00	Evans 42', 83'		Cummins 38'	Attendance: 17,579

25 February 2012 31	Preston North End	0–0	Walsall	Deepdale
15:00				Attendance: 11,091

3 March 2012 32	Colchester United	3–0	Preston North End	Colchester Community Stadium
15:00	Gillespie 19', 52'; Bond 90'			Attendance: 3,333

6 March 2012 33	Preston North End	0–0	Chesterfield	Deepdale
19:45				Attendance: 9,264

10 March 2012 34	Preston North End	0–0	Scunthorpe United	Deepdale
15:00				Attendance: 10,621

13 March 2012 35	Tranmere Rovers	2–1	Preston North End	Prenton Park
19:45	Showunmi 15'; Robinson 67'		Cummins 12'	Attendance: 4,612

17 March 2012 36	Exeter City	1–2	Preston North End	St James Park
15:00	Sercombe 65'		Hume 12', 84'	Attendance: 4,741

20 March 2012 37	Carlisle United	0–0	Preston North End	Brunton Park
19:45				Attendance: 6,925

24 March 2012 38	Preston North End	1–1	Bury	Deepdale
15:00	Aneke 68'		Elford-Alliyu 90'	Attendance: 1,735

27 March 2012 39	Preston North End	1–3	Brentford	Deepdale
19:45	Parry 42' (pen.)		Logan 9'; Donaldson 22' (pen.), 53'	Attendance: 9,148

31 March 2012 40	Sheffield Wednesday	2–0	Preston North End	Hillsborough
15:00	Madine 49', 64'			Attendance: 18,069

7 April 2012 41	Preston North End	1–1	Milton Keynes Dons	Deepdale
15:00	Wright 90'		Potter 27'	Attendance: 13,941

9 April 2012 42	Stevenage	1–1	Preston North End	Broadhall Way
15:00	Roberts 90'		Hume 85'	Attendance: 3,386

14 April 2012 43	Preston North End	1–0	Huddersfield Town	Deepdale
15:00	Robertson 54'			Attendance: 11,267

21 April 2012 44	Oldham Athletic	1–1	Preston North End	Boundary Park
15:00	Simpson 69'		Holroyd 79'	Attendance: 4,824

28 April 2012 45	Preston North End	2–2	Charlton Athletic	Deepdale
15:00	Hunt 57'; Alexander 90'		Haynes 11'; N'Guessan 35'	Attendance: 12,029

5 May 2012 46	Bournemouth	1–0	Preston North End	Seward Stadium
15:00	Daniels 51' (pen.); Cooper (yellow card) 60'		Hunt (yellow card) 30'; Morgan (yellow card) 42'; Robertson (yellow card) 49'	Attendance: 6,267

=== FA Cup ===
12 November 2011 Round 1	Preston North End	0–0	Southend United	Deepdale
				Attendance: 6,609

22 November 2011 Round 1	Southend United	1–0	Preston North End	Roots Hall
19:45	Dickinson 55'			Attendance: 4,537

=== League Cup ===
9 August 2011 Round 1	Preston North End	3–2	Crewe Alexandra	Deepdale
19:45	Tootle 3' (o.g.); Mellor 84'; Hume 90'		Miller 18'; Artell 40'	Attendance: 5,401

13 September 2011 Round 2	Charlton Athletic	0–2	Preston North End	The Valley
19:45			Russell 11'; Mayor 67'	Attendance: 5,130

21 September 2011 Round 3	Southampton	2–1	Preston North End	St. Mary's Stadium
19:45	Hooiveld 27'; Lallana 66'		Barton 52'

=== JP Trophy ===
6 December 2011 Semi final	Preston North End	1–1 (2–4 p)	Chesterfield	Deepdale
19:45	McCombe 16'		Westcarr 27'	Attendance: 5,835
	Penalties
	Parry (penalty scored); Mellor (penalty scored); Alexander (penalty missed); Coutts (penalty missed)		(penalty missed) Westcarr; (penalty scored) Whitaker; (penalty scored) Clarke; (penalty scored) Morgan; (penalty scored) Mendy

== Managerial change ==
Outgoing manager	Manner of departure	Date of vacancy	Position in table	Incoming manager	Date of appointment
(England) Phil Brown	Sacked	14 December 2011	10th	(Scotland) Graham Westley	14 January 2012

== Season statistics ==
=== Starts and goals ===
As of 5 May 2012

No.	Pos	Nat	Player	Total		League One		FA Cup		League Cup		League Trophy	
No.	Pos	Nat	Player	Apps	Goals	Apps	Goals	Apps	Goals	Apps	Goals	Apps	Goals
1	GK	(Germany) GER	Thorsten Stuckmann	32	0	28+0	0	2+0	0	0+0	0	2+0	0
2	DF	(Scotland) SCO	David Gray	27	0	18+5	0	1+0	0	0+1	0	2+0	0
4	MF	(England) ENG	Ian Ashbee	12	0	3+4	0	1+0	0	2+0	0	2+0	0
5	DF	(Scotland) SCO	Chris Robertson	17	1	17+0	1	0+0	0	0+0	0	0+0	0
6	DF	(Wales) WAL	Craig Morgan	24	1	17+1	1	2+0	0	2+0	0	2+0	0
7	FW	(Canada) CAN	Iain Hume	29	10	21+7	9	0+0	0	1+0	1	0+0	0
8	MF	(Scotland) SCO	Paul Coutts	45	2	40+0	2	2+0	0	1+1	0	1+0	0
9	FW	(England) ENG	Jamie Proctor	33	3	23+7	3	0+0	0	1+0	0	2+0	0
10	MF	(Scotland) SCO	Barry Nicholson	32	2	21+7	2	2+0	0	0+1	0	1+0	0
12	DF	(Scotland) SCO	Brian McLean	18	2	15+1	1	0+0	0	1+0	0	1+0	1
13	MF	(England) ENG	Alex Marrow	4	0	3+1	0	0+0	0	0+0	0	0+0	0
14	MF	(Ireland) EIR	Will Hayhurst	1	0	0+1	0	0+0	0	0+0	0	0+0	0
15	MF	(Ireland) EIR	Adam Barton	21	2	11+4	0	1+0	0	3+0	1	2+0	1
16	MF	(England) ENG	Danny Mayor	43	3	21+14	2	2+0	0	2+1	1	2+1	0
17	MF	(Wales) WAL	Paul Parry	47	4	39+1	4	2+0	0	2+0	0	3+0	0
18	DF	(Ireland) EIR	Daniel Devine	14	1	13+0	1	0+0	0	1+0	0	0+0	0
19	FW	(Jamaica) JAM	Keammar Daley	10	1	0+8	1	0+0	0	1+0	0	1+0	0
21	GK	(Scotland) SCO	Iain Turner	12	1	11+0	1	0+0	0	1+0	0	0+0	0
22	MF	(Scotland) SCO	Graham Alexander	21	2	17+1	2	0+0	0	1+0	0	1+1	0
23	DF	(England) ENG	Scott Leather	0	0	0+0	0	0+0	0	0+0	0	0+0	0
25	GK	(England) ENG	Andreas Arestidou	8	0	5+0	0	0+0	0	2+0	0	1+0	0
26	FW	(Australia) AUS	Bailey Wright	13	1	10+2	1	0+0	0	1+0	0	0+0	0
27	FW	(Northern Ireland) NIR	Jamie Douglas	4	1	0+4	1	0+0	0	0+0	0	0+0	0
28	DF	(England) ENG	George Miller	7	0	2+4	0	0+0	0	0+0	0	0+1	0
29	MF	(England) ENG	Doyle Middleton	3	0	1+0	0	0+2	0	0+0	0	0+0	0
33	FW	(England) ENG	Neil Mellor	20	9	15+1	8	1+0	0	1+1	1	1+0	0
34	FW	(England) ENG	Rhys Murphy	5	0	1+4	0	0+0	0	0+0	0	0+0	0
35	DF	(Germany) GER	Max Ehmer	8	0	6+2	0	0+0	0	0+0	0	0+0	0
36	MF	(England) ENG	Luke Clark	3	0	1+0	0	1+0	0	0+0	0	0+1	0
37	FW	(England) ENG	Chris Holroyd	19	1	14+5	1	0+0	0	0+0	0	0+0	0
38	MF	(England) ENG	Andrew Procter	19	0	19+0	0	0+0	0	0+0	0	0+0	0
39	FW	(Republic of Ireland) IRL	Graham Cummins	14	2	12+2	2	0+0	0	0+0	0	0+0	0
40	FW	(England) ENG	Brandon Zibaka	3	0	0+0	0	0+2	0	0+1	0	0+0	0
42	DF	(England) ENG	Nicky Hunt	16	1	14+2	1	0+0	0	0+0	0	0+0	0
44	MF	(England) ENG	Chuks Aneke	7	1	3+4	1	0+0	0	0+0	0	0+0	0
50	DF	(England) ENG	Aaron Brown	4	0	4+0	0	0+0	0	0+0	0	0+0	0
Players currently out on loan:
3	DF	(Northern Ireland) NIR	Conor McLaughlin	19	0	10+6	0	1+1	0	0+0	0	1+0	0
11	FW	(Germany) GER	Juvhel Tsoumou	22	4	5+11	3	2+0	0	2+0	0	2+0	1
20	MF	(England) ENG	Darel Russell	4	1	2+0	0	0+0	0	2+0	1	0+0	0
24	MF	(Northern Ireland) NIR	Seanan Clucas	4	0	0+1	0	0+0	0	3+0	0	0+0	0
Players featured for club who have left:
	FW	(England) ENG	Harry Bunn	1	1	1+0	1	0+0	0	0+0	0	0+0	0
	DF	(England) ENG	Clarke Carlisle	28	3	21+0	3	2+0	0	2+1	0	2+0	0
	MF	(England) ENG	Nathan Doyle	6	0	5+0	0	0+0	0	0+0	0	1+0	0
	FW	(Barbados) BRB	Jonathan Forte	4	0	2+1	0	0+0	0	0+0	0	1+0	0
	FW	(England) ENG	Jake Jervis	4	2	2+2	2	0+0	0	0+0	0	0+0	0
	DF	(Scotland) SCO	Jamie McAllister	4	0	4+0	0	0+0	0	0+0	0	0+0	0
	DF	(England) ENG	Jamie McCombe	7	1	6+0	0	0+0	0	0+0	0	1+0	1
	DF	(Scotland) SCO	Steven Smith	15	0	9+4	0	0+0	0	1+0	0	1+0	0

=== Goalscorers record ===
Place	Position	Nation	Number	Name	League One	FA Cup	League Cup	JP Trophy	Total
1	FW	(Canada)	7	Iain Hume	9	0	1	0	10
2	FW	(England)	33	Neil Mellor	8	0	1	0	9
3	MF	(Wales)	17	Paul Parry	4	0	0	0	4
3	FW	(Germany)	11	Juvhel Tsoumou	3	0	0	1	4
5	DF	(England)	~~5~~	Clarke Carlisle	3	0	0	0	3
5	MF	(England)	16	Danny Mayor	2	0	1	0	3
5	FW	(England)	9	Jamie Proctor	3	0	0	0	3
8	MF	(Scotland)	22	Graham Alexander	2	0	0	0	2
8	MF	(England)	15	Adam Barton	0	0	1	1	2
8	MF	(Scotland)	8	Paul Coutts	2	0	0	0	2
8	FW	(Republic of Ireland)	39	Graham Cummins	2	0	0	0	2
8	FW	(England)	34	Jake Jervis	2	0	0	0	2
8	DF	(Scotland)	12	Brian McLean	1	0	0	1	2
8	MF	(Scotland)	10	Barry Nicholson	2	0	0	0	2
14
14	FW	(England)	44	Chuks Aneke	1	0	0	0	1
14	FW	(England)	~~39~~	Harry Bunn	1	0	0	0	1
14	FW	(Jamaica)	19	Keammar Daley	1	0	0	0	1
14	DF	(Republic of Ireland)	18	Daniel Devine	1	0	0	0	1
14	FW	(Northern Ireland)	27	Jamie Douglas	1	0	0	0	1
14	FW	(England)	37	Chris Holroyd	1	0	0	0	1
14	DF	(England)	42	Nicky Hunt	1	0	0	0	1
14	DF	(England)	~~39~~	Jamie McCombe	0	0	0	1	1
14	DF	(Wales)	6	Craig Morgan	1	0	0	0	1
14	DF	(England)	5	Chris Robertson	1	0	0	0	1
14	MF	(England)	20	Darel Russell	0	0	1	0	1
14	GK	(England)	21	Iain Turner	1	0	0	0	1
14	DF	(Australia)	26	Bailey Wright	1	0	0	0	1
				TOTALS	54	0	4	3	61

=== Disciplinary record ===
Number	Nation	Position	Name	League One		FA Cup		League Cup		JP Trophy		Total	
Number	Nation	Position	Name	Yellow card	Red card	Yellow card	Red card	Yellow card	Red card	Yellow card	Red card	Yellow card	Red card
17	(Wales)	MF	Paul Parry	6	1	1	0	1	0	0	0	8	1
8	(Scotland)	MF	Paul Coutts	13	0	0	0	1	0	0	0	14	0
14	(Scotland)	DF	Steven Smith	5	1	0	0	1	0	0	0	6	1
6	(Wales)	DF	Craig Morgan	1	1	0	0	1	0	1	0	3	1
~~5~~	(England)	DF	Clarke Carlisle	5	0	1	0	0	0	0	0	6	0
38	(England)	MF	Andrew Procter	5	0	0	0	0	0	0	0	5	0
22	(Scotland)	MF	Graham Alexander	4	0	0	0	0	0	0	0	4	0
2	(Scotland)	DF	David Gray	4	0	0	0	0	0	0	0	4	0
7	(Canada)	FW	Iain Hume	3	0	0	0	1	0	0	0	4	0
10	(Scotland)	MF	Barry Nicholson	3	0	1	0	0	0	0	0	4	0
9	(England)	FW	Jamie Proctor	4	0	0	0	0	0	0	0	4	0
5	(England)	DF	Chris Robertson	4	0	0	0	0	0	0	0	4	0
37	(England)	FW	Chris Holroyd	3	0	0	0	0	0	0	0	3	0
3	(Northern Ireland)	DF	Conor McLaughlin	3	0	0	0	0	0	0	0	3	0
26	(Australia)	FW	Bailey Wright	2	0	0	0	1	0	0	0	3	0
25	(England)	GK	Andreas Arestidou	1	0	0	0	0	0	1	0	2	0
4	(England)	MF	Ian Ashbee	1	0	1	0	0	0	0	0	2	0
24	(Northern Ireland)	MF	Seanan Clucas	0	0	0	0	2	0	0	0	2	0
39	(Republic of Ireland)	FW	Graham Cummins	2	0	0	0	0	0	0	0	2	0
~~35~~	(England)	MF	Nathan Doyle	2	0	0	0	0	0	0	0	2	0
16	(England)	MF	Danny Mayor	1	0	0	0	0	0	1	0	2	0
12	(Scotland)	DF	Brian McLean	2	0	0	0	0	0	0	0	2	0
50	(England)	DF	Aaron Brown	1	0	0	0	0	0	0	0	1	0
36	(England)	MF	Luke Clark	0	0	0	0	1	0	0	0	1	0
19	(Jamaica)	FW	Keammar Daley	1	0	0	0	0	0	0	0	1	0
18	(England)	DF	Daniel Devine	1	0	0	0	0	0	0	0	1	0
15	(Republic of Ireland)	MF	Adam Barton	0	0	0	0	1	0	0	0	1	0
35	(Germany)	DF	Max Ehmer	1	0	0	0	0	0	0	0	1	0
42	(England)	DF	Nicky Hunt	1	0	0	0	0	0	0	0	1	0
13	(England)	MF	Alex Marrow	1	0	0	0	0	0	0	0	1	0
~~39~~	(England)	DF	Jamie McCombe	1	0	0	0	0	0	0	0	1	0
28	(England)	DF	George Miller	1	0	0	0	0	0	0	0	1	0
11	(Germany)	FW	Juvhel Tsoumou	1	0	0	0	0	0	0	0	1	0
			TOTALS	82	3	4	0	10	0	3	0	99	3

=== End-of-season awards ===
Player of the Season Award	Thorsten Stuckmann
Young Player of the Season Award	Danny Mayor
Player' Player of the Season Award	Thorsten Stuckmann
Top Scorer Award	Iain Hume
Goal of the Season Award	Danny Mayor vs. Hartlepool United
Community Player of the Season Award	Iain Hume

=== Overall ===
Games played	52 (45 League One, 3 League Cup, 1 FA Cup, 3 League Trophy)
Games won	17 (13 League One, 2 League Cup, 0 FA Cup, 2 League Trophy)
Games drawn	15 (15 League One, 0 League Cup, 0 FA Cup, 0 League Trophy)
Games lost	20 (17 League One, 1 League Cup, 1 FA Cup, 1 League Trophy)
Goals scored	62 (54 League One, 4 League Cup, 0 FA Cup, 4 League Trophy)
Goals conceded	76 (67 League One, 4 League Cup, 1 FA Cup, 4 League Trophy)
Goal difference	−14
Yellow cards	99 (82 League One, 10 League Cup, 4 FA Cup, 3 League Trophy)
Red cards	3 (3 League One, 0 League Cup, 0 FA Cup, 0 League Trophy)
Worst discipline	Paul Parry (8 yellows, 1 red)
Best result	3–1 vs. Brentford, 17 September 2011
Worst result	2–5 vs. Charlton Athletic, 5 November 2011
Most appearances	Paul Parry (45)
Top scorer	Neil Mellor (9 goals)
Points	53

== Transfers ==
=== In ===
No.	Pos.	Nat.	Name	Age	EU	Moving from	Type	Transfer window	Ends	Transfer fee	Source
21	GK	(Scotland)	Iain Turner	27	EU	Everton	Free transfer	Summer	2012	Free	
12	DF	(Scotland)	Brian McLean	26	EU	Falkirk (Scotland)	Free transfer	Summer	2013	Free	
22	MF	(Scotland)	Graham Alexander	39	EU	Burnley	Free transfer	Summer	2012	Free	
11	FW	(Germany)	Juvhel Tsoumou	20	EU	Alemannia Aachen (Germany)	Free transfer	Summer	2013	Free	
14	DF	(Scotland)	Steven Smith	25	EU	Norwich City	Free transfer	Summer	2012	Free	
19	FW	(Jamaica)	Keammar Daley	23	EU	Tivoli Gardens (Jamaica)	Transfer	Summer	2013	Undisclosed	
1	GK	(Germany)	Thorsten Stuckmann	30	EU	Free agent	Free transfer	Mid-Season	2011	Free	
37	FW	(England)	Chris Holroyd	25	EU	Rotherham United	Transfer	Winter	2013	Undisclosed	
38	MF	(England)	Andrew Procter	28	EU	Accrington Stanley	Transfer	Winter	2014	£75,000	
39	FW	(Republic of Ireland)	Graham Cummins	24	EU	Cork City (Republic of Ireland)	Transfer	Winter	2014	£84,000^{1}	
5	DF	(Scotland)	Chris Robertson	25	EU	Torquay United	Transfer	Winter	2014	Undisclosed	
50	DF	(England)	Aaron Brown	28	EU	Free agent	Free transfer		2012	Free	
42	DF	(England)	Nicky Hunt	28	EU	Free agent	Free Transfer		2012	Free	
36	MF	(England)	Luke Clark	17	EU	Youth system	Promoted		2013	Youth system	
14	MF	(Republic of Ireland)	Will Hayhurst	18	EU	Youth system	Promoted		2013	Youth system	

Notes
^{1}Although officially undisclosed, Preston North End Mad reported the fee to be around €100,000 (£84,000).

=== Loans in ===
No.	Pos.	Name	Country	Age	Loan club	Started	Ended	Start source	End source
5	DF	Clarke Carlisle	(England)	32	Burnley	11 July	31 January		
35	FW	Sam Hoskins	(England)	18	Southampton	8 November	14 December		
34	FW	Jonathan Forte	(Barbados) (England)	25	Southampton	8 November	14 December		
38	MF	Nathan Doyle	(England)	24	Barnsley	24 November	4 January		
39	DF	Jamie McCombe	(England)	29	Huddersfield Town	24 November	4 January		
34	FW	Jake Jervis	(England)	20	Birmingham City	31 December	30 January		
39	FW	Harry Bunn	(England)	19	Manchester City	2 January	31 January		
35	DF	Jamie McAllister	(Scotland)	33	Bristol City	20 January	18 February		
13	MF	Alex Marrow	(England)	22	Crystal Palace	27 January	30 June		
50	FW	Rhys Murphy	(England)	21	Arsenal	30 January	30 June		
35	DF	Max Ehmer	(Germany)	20	Queens Park Rangers	15 March	5 May		
44	MF	Chuks Aneke	(England)	18	Arsenal	22 March	30 June		

Sources: For loan start source see "Start source". For loan end source see "End source".
EU = if holds or not a European Union passport; Country: when 2 flags, 1st flag = country that plays for internationally, 2nd flag = country of birth; No. = number on jersey; P = Position (for position name, pause mouse pointer on abbreviation); Name = Name on jersey (for more extensive name, pause mouse pointer on name); In/Out = In: The player came in on loan, Out: The player went out on loan; Loan club = the club that the player moved on loan to or the club that the player came from on loan; Started = the date when the player's loan started; Ended = the date when the player's loan ended.

=== Out ===
No.	Pos.	Name	Country	Age	Type	Moving to	Transfer window	Transfer fee	Apps	Goals	Source
5	DF	Wayne Brown	(England)	33	Released	Free agent	Summer	Free	20	0	
3	DF	Callum Davidson	(Scotland)	34	Free transfer	St Johnstone (Scotland)	Summer	Free	181	22	
19	DF	Billy Jones	(England)	24	Free transfer	West Bromwich Albion	Summer	Free	173	13	
8	FW	Paul Hayes	(England)	27	Free transfer	Charlton Athletic	Summer	Free	26	4	
12	DF	Sean St Ledger	(Republic of Ireland)	26	Transfer	Leicester City	Summer	Undisclosed	200	11	
9	FW	Chris Brown	(England)	26	Transfer	Doncaster Rovers	Summer	Free	115	25	
31	DF	Neal Trotman	(England)	24	Transfer	Rochdale	Summer	Free	4	1	
1	GK	Andy Lonergan	(England)	27	Transfer	Leeds United	Summer	Undisclosed	232	0	
11	MF	Keith Treacy	(Republic of Ireland)	22	Transfer	Burnley	Summer	Undisclosed	58	11	
14	DF	Steven Smith	(Scotland)	26	Released			N/A	15	0	

EU = if holds or not a European Union passport; Country: when 2 flags, 1st flag = country that plays for internationally, 2nd flag = country of birth; N = number on jersey; P = Position (for position name, pause mouse pointer on abbreviation); Name = Name on jersey (for more extensive name, pause mouse pointer on name); Age = age on the day of the signing; Moving from = only indicate the club the player was playing before start playing for this club in this season, for the type of the moving see Status column; Moving to = only indicates the club the player is going to play next, for the type of the moving see Status column; Ends = when the player's current contract ends; n/a = Not applicable; Apps = Total number of competitive appearances (including substitute appearances) at the club prior to departure; Goals = Total number of competitive goals scored at the club prior to departure.

=== Loans out ===
No.	Pos.	Name	Country	Age	Loan club	Started	Ended	Start source	End source
20	MF	Darel Russell	(England)	46	Charlton Athletic	24 November	30 June		
21	GK	Iain Turner	(Scotland)	28	Dunfermline Athletic	11 January	16 March		
11	FW	Juvhel Tsoumou	(Germany)	35	Plymouth Argyle	31 January	30 June		
3	DF	Conor McLaughlin	(Northern Ireland)	35	Shrewsbury Town	2 March	2 May		
24	MF	Seanan Clucas	(Northern Ireland)	34	Burton Albion	22 March	30 May		

Sources: For loan start source see "Start source". For loan end source see "End source".
EU = if holds or not a European Union passport; Country: when 2 flags, 1st flag = country that plays for internationally, 2nd flag = country of birth; No. = number on jersey; P = Position (for position name, pause mouse pointer on abbreviation); Name = Name on jersey (for more extensive name, pause mouse pointer on name); In/Out = In: The player came in on loan, Out: The player went out on loan; Loan club = the club that the player moved on loan to or the club that the player came from on loan; Started = the date when the player's loan started; Ended = the date when the player's loan ended.

=== Contracts ===
No.	Pos.	Nat.	Name	Age	Status	Contract length	Expiry date	Source
10	MF	(Scotland)	Barry Nicholson	32	Signed	2 years	June 2013	
1	GK	(Germany)	Thorsten Stuckmann	30	Signed	1 month	January 2012	
1	GK	(Germany)	Thorsten Stuckmann	31	Signed	1.5 years	June 2013	
