= List of Preston North End F.C. Internationals =

Preston North End Football Club is an English professional football club based in Preston, Lancashire. They are a founding member of the Football League, and have played in the League for their entire existence. All players who have earned an international cap while contracted to Preston are listed below.

== Key ==
- Appearance and goal totals for full internationals include all FIFA-sanctioned matches. Substitute appearances are included. Wartime matches are regarded as unofficial and are excluded.
- Statistics are correct as of matches played on 6 October 2026.

=== Playing positions ===
GK	Goalkeeper	RB	Right back	RW	Right winger	DF	Defender	HB	Half back	IF	Inside forward	DM	Defensive midfielder
OL	Outside left	LB	Left back	LW	Left winger	CB	Centre back	FW	Forward	FB	Full back	RM	Right midfielder
W	Winger	MF	Midfielder	ST	Striker	WH	Wing half	AM	Attacking midfielder	CM	Central midfielder	LM	Left midfielder
U	Utility player	OR	Outside right	SW	Sweeper	LH	Left half	RH	Right half	IR	Inside Right	IL	Inside Left

Symbol	Meaning
‡	Preston player in the 2026–27 season.
*	Player has left Preston but is still playing in a professional league.
♦	Player went on to manage the club.

== Senior International Appearances ==
The following list is a list of players who have earned senior international caps while playing at Preston North End.

Player	Nationality	Position	Total			Total with Preston			Notes	Ref.
Player	Nationality	Position	Years	Caps	Goals	Years	Caps	Goals	Notes	Ref.
William Rose	England	GK	1884-1891	5	0	1886-1888	1	0		
Robert Mills-Roberts	Wales	GK	1885-1892	8	0	1888-1892	2	0		
Fred Dewhurst	England	IF/CF	1886-1889	9	11	1886-1889	9	11		
Bob Howarth	England	RB	1887-1894	4	0	1887-1894	4	0		
James Trainer	Wales	GK	1887-1899	8	0	1887-1899	20	0		
John Goodall	England	IR/CF	1887-1899	14	13	1887–1889	4	3		
Bob Holmes	England	FB	1888-1895	7	0	1888-1895	7	0		
Robert Roberts	Wales	LH/CH	1884–1892	9	1	1892	1	0		
Frank Becton	England	IL/CF	1895–1897	2	2	1895	1	2		
Andrew Gara	Ireland	IL	1902	3	3	1902	3	3		
Peter McBride	Scotland	GK	1904-1909	6	0	1904-1909	6	0		
Dickie Bond	England	OR	1905–1910	8	2	1905-1909	5	2		
James McKnight	Ireland	IF	1912–1913	2	2	1912	1	1		
Joe McCall	England	CH	1913–1920	5	1	1913–1920	5	1		
Stan Davies	Wales	CF/IF	1920–1930	18	5	1920–1921	3	3		
Archie Rawlings	England	OR	1921	1	0	1921	1	0		
Tommy Roberts	England	CF	1923–1924	2	2	1923–1924	2	2		
Alex James	Scotland	CF	1925–1933	8	3	1925–1929	4	3		
Roy John	Wales	GK	1931–1938	14	0	1934	2	0		
Andy Beattie	Scotland	FB/RH	1937–1939	7	0	1937–1939	7	0		
Frank O'Donnell	Scotland	CF/IL	1937–1938	6	2	1937	4	2		
Harry Holdcroft	England	GK	1936	2	0	1936	2	0		
George Mutch	Scotland	IR	1938	1	0	1938	1	0		
Tom Smith	Scotland	CH	1934–1938	2	0	1938	1	0		
Bill Shankly	Scotland	RH	1938–1939	5	0	1938-1939	5	0		
Jimmy Dougal	Scotland	OR/IL/CF	1939	1	1	1939	1	1		
Bobby Beattie	Scotland	IF	1939	1	0	1939	1	0		
Andy McLaren	Scotland	IF	1947-1948	4	4	1947-1948	4	4		
Tom Finney	England	OR/CF	1946-1958	76	30	1946-1958	76	30		
Bobby Langton	England	OL	1946–1950	11	1	1948–1949	2	0		
Tommy Docherty♦	Scotland	WH	1951–1959	25	1	1952–1959	22	1		
Willie Cunningham	Scotland	FB	1954–1955	8	0	1954–1955	8	0		
Tommy Thompson	England	IR	1951–1957	2	0	1955–1961	1	0		
Frank O'Farrell	Republic of Ireland	WH	1952–1959	9	2	1956–1959	2	0		
Johnny Fullam	Republic of Ireland	WH	1960–1969	11	1	1960-1961	1	0		
John O'Neill	Republic of Ireland	U	1960	1	0	1960	1	0		
Alan Kelly Sr.♦	Republic of Ireland	GK	1956–1973	47	0	1958–1973	45	0		
Brian Godfrey	Wales	IF	1964–1965	3	2	1964–1965	3	2		
Willie Irvine	Republic of Ireland	CF	1963–1972	23	8	1968–1971	3	3		
Ray Treacy	Republic of Ireland	ST	1966–1980	42	5	1973–1976	8	1		
Mark Lawrenson	Republic of Ireland	CB	1977–1987	39	5	1977	1	0		
Paul McGee	Republic of Ireland	ST	1978–1980	15	4	1979-1980	6	2		
John Anderson	Republic of Ireland	RB/CB	1979–1988	16	1	1979–1982	5	1		
Tepi Moilanen	Finland	GK	1997–2003	4	0	1998–2000	2	0		
Colin Murdock	Northern Ireland	CB	2000–2006	34	1	2000-2003	17	0		
Bjarki Gunnlaugsson	Iceland	W	1999–2002	2	1	2000-2003	17	0		
Brian McBride	United States	ST	1993–2006	96	30	2000–2001	3	2		
David Healy	Northern Ireland	ST	2000–2013	95	36	2000–2001	39	16		
Graham Alexander♦	Scotland	RB	2002–2009	40	0	2000–2001	30	0		
Eddie Lewis	United States	LW	1996–2008	82	10	2002–2005	21	6		
Ricardo Fuller	Jamaica	ST	1999–2012	76	10	2002–2005	10	2		
George Koumantarakis	South Africa	ST	1997–2004	13	1	2002–2004	1	0		
Brian O'Neil	Scotland	CM	2003–2005	7	0	2025–	1	0		
Callum Davidson	Scotland	LB	1998–2009	19	0	2021–	2	0		
Claude Davis	Jamaica	CB	2000–2012	69	2	2025–	22	0		
Patrick Agyemang	Ghana	ST	2003–2006	2	1	2004–2006	1	0		
Andy Smith	Northern Ireland	ST	2003–2005	14	0	2004–2005	7	0		
David Nugent	England	ST	2007	1	1	2007	1	1		
Wayne Henderson	Republic of Ireland	GK	2006–2007	6	0	2007	3	0		
Seyfo Soley	Gambia	CB/CM	2006–2007	10	1	2007	1	0		
Tamás Priskin	Hungary	ST	2005-2017	63	17	2008	1	0		
Sean St. Ledger	Republic of Ireland	CB	2009–2013	37	3	2009–2013	14	1		
Eddie Nolan	Republic of Ireland	CB/LB	2009	3	0	2009	3	0		
Ross Wallace	Scotland	LW	2009	2	0	2009	2	0		
Veliče Šumulikoski	North Macedonia	CM	2000–2013	84	1	2009–2010	9	0		
Keith Treacy	Republic of Ireland	LW	2010–2011	6	0	2009–2010	5	0		
Iain Hume	Canada	ST	2003–2016	43	6	2010–2014	7	3		
Craig Morgan	Wales	CB	2006–2011	23	0	2010–2011	3	0		
Adam Barton*	Northern Ireland	CM	2010	1	0	2010	1	0		
Conor McLaughlin	Northern Ireland	RB	2011–2021	43	1	2011	1	0		
Bailey Wright*	Australia	CB	2014–2023	29	2	2014–2017	12	0		
Keammar Daley*	Jamaica	RW	2008–2013	27	2	2011–2013	7	0		
Robbie Brady*	Republic of Ireland	LWB	2012–	73	10	2022–2026	16	2		
Chris Humphrey	Jamaica	RW	2012–2015	12	2	2012–2015	12	2		
Scott Wiseman	Gibraltar	RB	2013–2023	38	0	2013–2015	6	0		
Alan Browne*	Republic of Ireland	CM	2017–	39	5	2017–2024	35	5		
Andy Boyle	Republic of Ireland	CM	2017	1	0	2017	1	0		
Daryl Horgan*	Republic of Ireland	LW	2017–2021	1	0	2017–2018	4	0		
Sean Maguire*	Republic of Ireland	ST	2017–2020	11	1	2017–2020	11	1		
Billy Bodin*	Wales	LW	2018	1	0	2018	1	0		
Callum Robinson*	Republic of Ireland	LW/ST	2018–	38	9	2018-2019	8	0		
Graham Burke*	Republic of Ireland	FW	2018	3	1	2018	1	0		
Daniel Johnson*	Jamaica	CM	2020–	26	3	20202-23	18	3		
Jayson Molumby*	Republic of Ireland	CM	2020–	40	0	2021	3	0		
Troy Parrott*	Republic of Ireland	ST	2019–	41	15	2022–2023	3	0		
Will Keane*	Republic of Ireland	ST	2021–2023	5	0	2023	1	0		
Liam Millar*	Canada	LW	2018-	47	1	2023-2024	7	0		
Stefán Teitur Þórðarson*	Iceland	CM	2020–	40	1	2023-2024	13	1		
Milutin Osmajić*	Montenegro	ST	2020–	40	10	2023–2026	19	9		
Ryan Porteous*	Scotland	CB	2022–	13	1	2025	1	0		
Daniel Jebbison*	Canada	ST	2025–	9	0	2025-2026	2	0		
Jordan Thompson‡	Northern Ireland	CM	2018–	39	1	2025–	0	0		
Ali McCann‡	Northern Ireland	CM	2020–	35	1	2021–	29	0		
Andrija Vukčević‡	Montenegro	LB	2022–	23	0	2025–	6	0		

== Other senior international appearances ==
=== B Internationals ===
The following list is a list of players who have earned international caps for a B team while playing at Preston North End.

Player	Nationality	Position	Total			Total with Preston			Notes	Ref.
Player	Nationality	Position	Years	Caps	Goals	Years	Caps	Goals	Notes	Ref.
Tom Finney	England	OR/CF	1948	1	0	1948	1	0		
Willie Cunningham	Scotland	RB	1952	1	0	1952	1	0		
Tommy Docherty	Scotland	RH	1952–1953	2	0	1952–1953	2	0		
Colin Murdock	Northern Ireland	CB	1996–1998	3	0	1996–1998	3	0		

=== Wartime and Victory internationals ===
The following list is a list of players who have earned international caps during the First or Second World War.

Player	Nationality	Position	Total			Total with Preston			Notes	Ref.
Player	Nationality	Position	Years	Caps	Goals	Years	Caps	Goals	Notes	Ref.
Jimmy Dougal	Scotland	IF	1940	1	1	1940	1	1		
Andy Beattie	Scotland	FB	1941–1942	5	0	1941–1942	5	0		
Tom Smith	Scotland	CH	1942	1	0	1942	1	0		

== Youth International Appearances ==
=== Under 21's ===
The following list is a list of players who have earned international caps for an Under 21's team while playing at Preston North End.

Player	Nationality	Position	Total			Total with Preston			Notes	Ref.
Player	Nationality	Position	Years	Caps	Goals	Years	Caps	Goals	Notes	Ref.
Brian Barry-Murphy	Republic of Ireland	CM	2003–2004	2	0	2003–2004	2	0		
Michael Keane	Republic of Ireland	LW	2001-2002	4	0	2001-2002	4	0		
Simon Lynch	Scotland	ST	2002-2003	13	5	2002-2003	13	5		
Pawel Abbott	Poland	ST	2003	5	1	2003	5	1		
Filipe Oliveira	Portugal	ST	2004-2007	21	4	2004	1	0		
David Nugent	England	ST	2005-2007	14	4	2005-2007	14	4		
Eddie Nolan	Republic of Ireland	CB/LB	2007-2010	15	0	2008-2009	3	0		
Seanan Clucas*	Northern Ireland	CM	2010–2014	11	0	2010-2011	6	0		
Conor McLaughlin	Northern Ireland	RB	2010–2012	7	0	2010-2012	5	0		
Danny Devine*	Northern Ireland	CB	2010-2011	2	0	2010-2011	2	0		
Adam Barton*	Republic of Ireland	CM	2011	5	0	2011-2012	4	0		
Will Hayhurst*	Republic of Ireland	LW	2013-2014	5	0	2013-2014	4	0		
Alan Browne*	Republic of Ireland	CM	2014-2017	11	3	2014-2017	11	3		
Jordan Pickford*	England	GK	2015-2017	14	0	2015	5	0		
Lukas Nmecha*	Germany	ST	2019-2021	20	12	2019	1	0		
Sepp van den Berg*	Netherlands	CB	2021-2023	8	1	2021-2022	4	0		
Tom Cannon*	Republic of Ireland	ST	2024	1	1	2024	1	1		
Thierry Small‡	England	LWB/LW	2025–2026	2	0	2025–2026	2	0		

=== Under 20's ===
The following list is a list of players who have earned international caps for an Under 20's team while playing at Preston North End.

Player	Nationality	Position	Total			Total with Preston			Notes	Ref.
Player	Nationality	Position	Years	Caps	Goals	Years	Caps	Goals	Notes	Ref.
David Lucas	England	GK	1997	4	0	1997	4	0		
Andy Lonergan	England	GK	2002–2003	10	0	2002–2003	10	0		
Callum Robinson*	England	LW	2014-2015	11	3	2014-2015	5	0		
Stephy Mavididi*	England	ST	2017	3	3	2017	3	3		

=== Under 19's ===
The following list is a list of players who have earned international caps for an Under 19's team while playing at Preston North End.

Player	Nationality	Position	Total			Total with Preston			Notes	Ref.
Player	Nationality	Position	Years	Caps	Goals	Years	Caps	Goals	Notes	Ref.
David Elebert	Republic of Ireland	CB	2005	1	0	2005	1	0		
Neil Dougan*	Northern Ireland	ST	2009-2010	7	0	2009-2010	7	0		
Matty James*	England	CM	2009-2010	13	0	2010	4	0		
Jamie Douglas*	Northern Ireland	AM	2010	3	0	2010	3	0		
Seanan Clucas*	Northern Ireland	CM	2010	4	0	2010	4	0		
Conor McLaughlin	Northern Ireland	RB	2009-2010	14	1	2009-2010	14	1		
Will Hayhurst*	Republic of Ireland	LW	2013	2	0	2013	2	0		
Alan Browne*	Republic of Ireland	CM	2013-2015	14	1	2013-2015	5	1		
Kian Best*	England	LWB	2023–2024	7	2	2023-2024	7	2		
Jayden Meghoma*	England	LWB	2025–2026	12	0	2025	4	0		
Harrison Armstrong*	England	CM	2025–2026	9	2	2025	6	2		
