= Brandon Zibaka =

English footballer

Personal information
- Date of birth: 20 May 1995 (age 31)
- Place of birth: Camden, England
- Height: 6 ft 0 in (1.83 m)
- Position: Striker

Senior career*
Years	Team	Apps	(Gls)
2011–2013	Preston North End	0	(0)
2013–	Chorley	12	(1)
- * Club domestic league appearances and goals as of 20:21, 11 September 2011 (UTC)

Brandon Zibaka (born 20 May 1995) is an English footballer playing as a striker for Chorley in the Conference North.

== Career ==
Zibaka was born in Camden, but he grew up in Collyhurst, Manchester. He started his career in the youth team of Preston North End and was offered a scholarship in 2011. He made his debut for the first team on 13 September 2011, in the League Cup second round tie against Charlton Athletic, in a 2–0 win. He replaced Adam Barton as a substitute in the second half. He became North End's youngest ever player at the age of 16 years and 161 days, beating Doyle Middleton's previous record by 6 days set in 2010. Zibaka signed for Chorley in October 2013.
