= Paul Coutts =

Scottish footballer (born 1988)

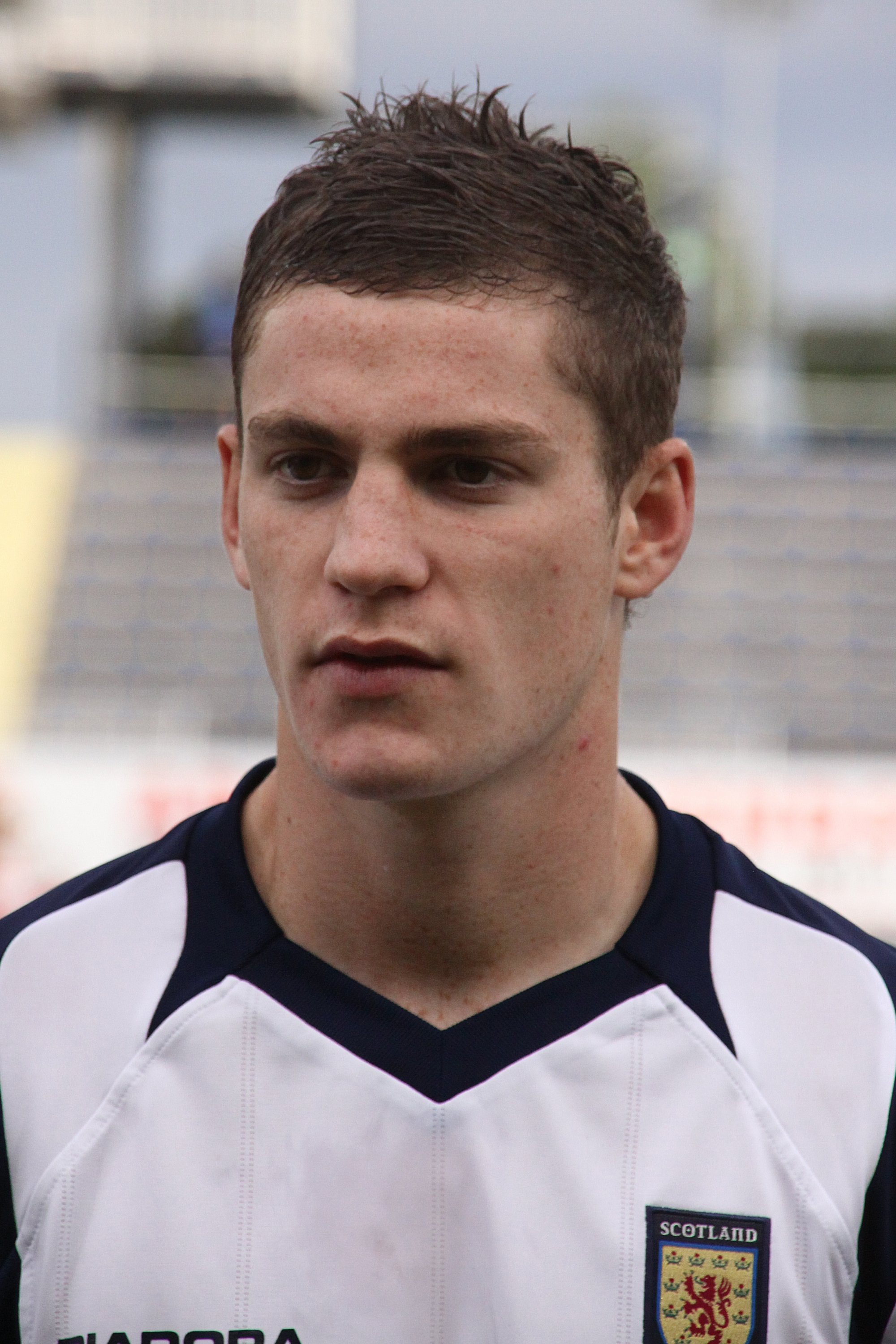
- Coutts representing the Scotland under-21 team in 2009

Personal information
- Full name: Paul Alexander Coutts
- Date of birth: 22 July 1988 (age 38)
- Place of birth: Aberdeen, Scotland
- Height: 1.83 m (6 ft 0 in)
- Position: Midfielder

Youth career
- 1998–2005: Aberdeen

Senior career*
| Years | Team | Apps | (Gls) |
| 2005–2008 | Cove Rangers | 66 | (9) |
| 2008–2010 | Peterborough United | 53 | (0) |
| 2010–2012 | Preston North End | 77 | (4) |
| 2012–2015 | Derby County | 59 | (2) |
| 2015–2019 | Sheffield United | 124 | (3) |
| 2019–2021 | Fleetwood Town | 52 | (0) |
| 2021 | → Salford City (loan) | 19 | (0) |
| 2021–2023 | Bristol Rovers | 61 | (0) |
| 2023-2026 | Inverurie Loco Works | 23 | (2) |

International career
| 2008–2010 | Scotland U21 | 8 | (0) |
- * Club domestic league appearances and goals as of 21:00, 24 March 2024 (UTC)

Paul Alexander Coutts (born 22 July 1988) is a Scottish footballer who last played for Highland League club Inverurie Loco Works.

A product of the Scottish Highland Football League, Coutts' first senior professional club was his home town club, Cove Rangers who are located 4 miles south of Aberdeen. In 2008, Coutts transferred into the English Football League joining Peterborough United. He then moved to Preston North End in 2010 before joining Derby County in 2012. In January 2015, he signed for Sheffield United. He has represented the Scotland under-21 team.

== Club career ==
=== Aberdeen ===
Born in Aberdeen, Coutts started his football career at Scottish Premier League side Aberdeen as a youth player from age 10, the club he supported as a boy before he was released aged 16 because the club thought he was too small to play professional football. Coutts said this move was "a big blow to be told by Aberdeen that I wouldn't be getting a contract but it was also a blessing in disguise."

=== Cove Rangers ===
In 2005, Coutts then moved into the Highland Football League with his local senior club, Cove Rangers. When at Cove Rangers he also had a full-time job working in the oil industry, During this time his work and football clashed with Coutts stating that, " I didn't go on the rigs but I probably would have done if I hadn't made it as a footballer. It was hard work doing a full-time job and then dashing off to training a couple of nights a week or for midweek games. Combining the two things can be pretty tiring. I did it for about a year and it was quite a tough time but I was about 17 or 18 and full of energy. Looking back, it was a good learning curve for me."

During his time at Cove Rangers he was a part of their Highland Football League title winning season, he also won the Highland Football League "Player of the Year" award in the same season. Cove's chairman Keith Moorhouse said that Coutts second season at the club "was absolutely outstanding, head and shoulders the best player in the league. He worked really hard on his upper-body strength and started to boss games." The captain of the club Kevin Tindall said that Coutts "had a good head on his shoulders. He listened to the senior players and the manager but he also had confidence in his own ability As centre-half at the time, Paul played in front of me and it was a joy to just give him the ball. We knew he would get a chance in the professional game."

=== Peterborough United ===
Coutts then joined Peterborough United on a three-year deal in July 2008 for a nominal fee after impressing with his ball control during a trial period with the club, which involved playing an hour during each of two pre-season friendlies, against a Liverpool XI and Stevenage Borough. Coutts made his professional debut for Peterborough as a substitute in a 5–4 win over Bristol Rovers, and had his first start the following game against local rivals Northampton Town, a 1–1 draw. In Coutts' first season with Peterborough, he made 37 league appearances and 4 FA Cup appearances as well as a Football League Trophy appearance as The Posh gained promotion to the Championship. On the 2008–09 season, Coutts said "I came from playing non-league in Scotland to winning promotion at Peterborough in one season, so that was probably the biggest jump for me so far."

In the 2009–10 season, Coutts made 16 Championship appearances the following season, with 1 game in the FA Cup and League Cup before attracting the interest of Preston North End in January 2010, managed by former Peterborough manager Darren Ferguson. Ferguson's replacement at Peterborough, Mark Cooper said the interest in the player was expected and Coutts was later left out of the Peterborough match day squad that played against Sheffield Wednesday on 23 January 2010. Cooper later denied unrest in the dressing room after several Posh players wanted to join Preston. Cooper was sacked by the club on 1 February 2010, as the rumours of Coutts rejoining Ferguson at Preston intensified.

=== Preston North End ===
Coutts signed a deal with Preston North End in February 2010 linking up with Darren Ferguson again at the central Lancashire club. Coutts was a first team regular under Ferguson and his successor Phil Brown, as Preston were relegated in League One in the 2010–11 season. Preston also turned down a bid from Coutts former club Peterborough United in August 2011, who had been promoted back to the Championship under Ferguson's management.

In December 2011, Coutts was named the club captain as Graham Alexander took up a coaching role after Brown was sacked as team manager and he retained the role under new manager Graham Westley who took over in January 2012. However, on 3 February 2012, he was stripped of the Preston captaincy by Westley who was unimpressed by the Scotsman's attitude. Later on in the month, former club Peterborough United dismissed interest in a loan move for the player. Coutts did remain as a regular in the team until the end of the season.

On 20 February 2012, Coutts goal against Colchester United on 6 August 2011 was one of the five nominees for the 2011 Football League Goal of Year award selected out of a shortlist of 10 by Soccer AM viewers for the 2012 Football League Awards. The award winners were announced on 11 March 2012 and Coutts lost on the award to Cardiff City's Peter Whittingham's goal against Barnsley.

Ahead of the 2012–13 season, Coutts along with 7 other players was told by the manager via SMS not to report to pre-season training as he was not in Westley's plans. Coutts had turned down a move to Peterborough United and was attracting interest from Championship clubs Derby County and Birmingham City. Chairman Peter Ridsdale stated that Derby's interest was "an enquiry at this stage rather than an offer." On 12 July 2012, Coutts began talks with Derby County with a deal being reported as close to being completed on 13 July 2012.

=== Derby County ===
On 14 July 2012, Coutts joined Derby County on a three-year contract. The fee for the player was speculated be to £150,000. On his move to Derby, Coutts said "This is a big move for me," he said. "I have had a few big moves along the way in terms of stepping up, and this is another one. Hopefully, I can take it in my stride. I have played in the Championship for a few seasons, so I know what it's about. It is a big step but I feel I am at a stage in my career where I can deal with it and the lads here at Derby have been great. They have made me feel welcome." He also said that his early days at semi-professional Cove Rangers made him grateful for professional career "When I look back, it certainly makes me appreciate how lucky I am to be playing football professionally and I will never take it for granted. When you have seen the other side of it, and what you could be doing, you are grateful to have the chance to go into work every day and play football."

Coutts made his Derby debut against Scunthorpe United in the League Cup, a game which Derby drew 5–5 after extra-time but went on to lose 7–6 on penalties. Coutts made his league début for Derby in the first game of the season, a 2–2 draw at home to Sheffield Wednesday, providing an assist for the second Derby goal. Coutts added to his assist total by creating two more goals in Derby's 5–1 win over Watford on 1 September. He scored his first goal for the club in Derby's 2–2 draw at Middlesbrough on 3 October 2012. Coutts remained a regular in the starting eleven in the early part of the season, saying in a December interview that Derby had the capabilities to beat anyone in the league. He remained a fixture in the Derby starting eleven and scored his second goal of the season in a 2–1 win at Leeds United on 1 April.

He was named the 37th best player in the 2012–13 Football League Championship by the Actim Index. Coutts 2013–14 pre-season was disrupted by injury and in late September, he dislocated a knee in a match against Leicester City and was expected to take at least five months to recover.

=== Sheffield United ===
On 23 January 2015, Coutts signed for Sheffield United on an undisclosed fee, signing a contract until summer 2017. On the same day Derby County teammate Kieron Freeman also joined the Blades on a free transfer, both linking up with former manager Nigel Clough. He scored his first goal for Sheffield United in an EFL Trophy tie against Walsall on 4 October 2016. Coutts suffered a horrible injury on 17 November 2017 during a game away at Burton Albion's Pirelli Stadium when a challenge from Marvin Sordell broke his right tibia and ruled him out for the rest of the season.

On 28 April 2019 Coutts saw his second promotion with United, returning to the Premier League after a 12-year absence, but was released by Sheffield United at the end of the 2018–19 season.

=== Fleetwood Town ===
In July 2019 he signed for Fleetwood Town. He scored his first goal for the club in an EFL Trophy tie against Everton U21s on 26 November 2019.

==== Salford City (loan) ====
On 21 January 2021, Coutts joined League Two side Salford City on loan for the remainder of the 2020–21 season. He was cup-tied for Salford's victory in the 2020 EFL Trophy Final (played in March 2021).

=== Bristol Rovers ===
On 26 May 2021, Coutts agreed to join League Two club Bristol Rovers on a one-year deal from 1 July, linking up with former Fleetwood manager Joey Barton. On the eve of the new season, Coutts was announced as the new club captain. He made his debut for the club in the opening day defeat to Mansfield Town. Coutts was sent off in the 77th minute for an off-the-ball incident with Mansfield striker Danny Johnson with the latter going on to score a 96th-minute penalty to give his side a 2–1 victory. On 8 January 2022, Coutts opened his account for the club from the spot with the equaliser in a 2–1 FA Cup third round defeat to former club Peterborough United. It was revealed in April 2022 that Coutts had earned a contract extension for the following season having appeared in 23 of the league matches across the season. In the penultimate game of the season, Coutts received a second straight red card of the season, again for violent conduct, in the 98th minute of a 4–3 victory over Rochdale, leading to Coutts being suspended for the final four matches of the season, rendering him unavailable for the play-offs should Rovers miss out on automatic promotion. Coutts' absence was not missed however as Rovers thrashed Scunthorpe United 7–0 to move into third place, promoted on goals scored.

In October 2022, Coutts suffered an ankle injury in training that would rule him out until the new year. Having made a return to first-team action in December, a knee injury sustained in training in March 2023 proved worse than first feared and he was ruled out for the remainder of the season. Following the conclusion of the 2022–23 season, he was announced to have been offered a role as part of the Bristol Rovers coaching staff moving forward. He was released at the end of the season.

=== Inverurie Loco Works ===
On 6 August 2023, Coutts returned to Scotland to join Highland League club Inverurie Loco Works where he would also have the opportunity to take up a coaching role within the club. He made his debut for the club in a 2-1 win away at Huntly in the Highland League Cup on 12 August 2023. His league debut for the club came 4 days later, suffering a 2-1 defeat at home to Formartine United. On 20 September 2023 the club announced that Coutts would be supporting first team coach Jamie Watt on an interim basis along with goalkeeping coach John Farquhar until they appointed a permanent manager. On 13 October 2023 it was announced that former player Dean Donaldson would become the new first team head coach, with Jamie Lennox and Greg Moir supporting him. Coutts opened his goal scoring account with the club on 18 October 2023, scoring a penalty in the Aberdeenshire Shield quarter-final, which resulted in a 5-1 defeat at home to Buckie Thistle. He scored his first league goal for the club on 6 January 2024, a 75th minute winning penalty during a 2-1 win away to Huntly.

On 11 April 2026, the club announced that Coutts would be playing his final match for the club that day.

== International career ==
Coutts was called up to the Scotland under-21 side for the first time in November 2008, for the friendly against Northern Ireland under-21 on 18 November 2008. He made his debut in the game, which Scotland lost 3–1. Coutts was capped 8 times by Scotland U21, with his final appearance being on 11 October 2010, a 2–1 defeat in the second leg of the 2011 European under-21 Championship qualifying play-off against Iceland under-21, Scotland lost 4–2 on aggregate and missed out on qualifying for the main tournament.

== Coaching career ==
In 2024, Coutts returned to first club Aberdeen to assist in coaching with the academy. In January 2026, he stepped up to assist first-team interim manager Peter Leven.

== Career statistics ==
As of 21:00 (UTC) 24 March 2024

| Club | Season | League | | | National Cup | | League Cup | | Other | | Total | |
| Club | Season | Division | Apps | Goals | Apps | Goals | Apps | Goals | Apps | Goals | Apps | Goals |
|---|---|---|---|---|---|---|---|---|---|---|---|---|
| Peterborough United | 2008–09 | League One | 37 | 0 | 4 | 0 | 0 | 0 | 1 (Note: Appearance(s) in Football League Trophy) | 0 | 42 | 0 |
| Peterborough United | 2009–10 | Championship | 16 | 0 | 1 | 0 | 1 | 0 | — | | 18 | 0 |
| Peterborough United | Total | | 53 | 0 | 5 | 0 | 1 | 0 | 1 | 0 | 60 | 0 |
| Preston North End | 2009–10 | Championship | 13 | 1 | — | | — | | — | | 13 | 1 |
| Preston North End | 2010–11 | Championship | 23 | 1 | 1 | 0 | 3 | 1 | — | | 27 | 2 |
| Preston North End | 2011–12 | League One | 41 | 2 | 2 | 0 | 2 | 0 | 1 | 0 | 46 | 2 |
| Preston North End | Total | | 77 | 4 | 3 | 0 | 5 | 1 | 1 | 0 | 86 | 5 |
| Derby County | 2012–13 | Championship | 44 | 2 | 2 | 0 | 1 | 0 | — | | 47 | 2 |
| Derby County | 2013–14 | Championship | 8 | 0 | 0 | 0 | 3 | 0 | 0 | 0 | 11 | 0 |
| Derby County | 2014–15 | Championship | 7 | 0 | 1 | 0 | 1 | 0 | — | | 9 | 0 |
| Derby County | Total | | 59 | 2 | 3 | 0 | 5 | 0 | 0 | 0 | 67 | 2 |
| Sheffield United | 2014–15 | League One | 20 | 0 | — | | — | | 2 (Note: Appearance(s) in League One play-offs) | 0 | 22 | 0 |
| Sheffield United | 2015–16 | League One | 32 | 0 | 3 | 0 | 0 | 0 | 1 | 0 | 36 | 0 |
| Sheffield United | 2016–17 | League One | 43 | 2 | 2 | 1 | 0 | 0 | 2 | 1 | 47 | 4 |
| Sheffield United | 2017–18 | Championship | 16 | 1 | 0 | 0 | 1 | 0 | — | | 17 | 1 |
| Sheffield United | 2018–19 | Championship | 13 | 0 | 1 | 0 | 0 | 0 | — | | 14 | 0 |
| Sheffield United | Total | | 124 | 3 | 6 | 1 | 1 | 0 | 5 | 1 | 136 | 5 |
| Fleetwood Town | 2019–20 | League One | 32 | 0 | 3 | 0 | 1 | 0 | 3 (Note: One appearance one goal in Football League Trophy; two appearances in League One play-offs) | 1 | 39 | 1 |
| Fleetwood Town | 2020–21 | League One | 20 | 0 | 1 | 0 | 3 | 0 | 4 | 0 | 28 | 0 |
| Fleetwood Town | Total | | 52 | 0 | 4 | 0 | 4 | 0 | 7 | 1 | 67 | 1 |
| Salford City (loan) | 2020–21 | League Two | 19 | 0 | — | | — | | — | | 19 | 0 |
| Salford City (loan) | Total | | 19 | 0 | — | | — | | — | | 19 | 0 |
| Bristol Rovers | 2021–22 | League Two | 39 | 0 | 4 | 1 | 0 | 0 | 0 | 0 | 43 | 1 |
| Bristol Rovers | 2022–23 | League One | 22 | 0 | 0 | 0 | 0 | 0 | 3 | 0 | 25 | 0 |
| Bristol Rovers | Total | | 61 | 0 | 4 | 1 | 0 | 0 | 3 | 0 | 68 | 1 |
| Inverurie Loco Works | 2023-24 | Highland League | 23 | 2 | 0 | 0 | 0 | 0 | 8 | 3 | 22 | 4 |
| Career total | | | 468 | 11 | 25 | 2 | 16 | 1 | 25 | 5 | 534 | 19 |

== Honours ==
Cove Rangers

- Highland Football League: 2007–08

Peterborough United

- Football League One runner-up: 2008–09

Sheffield United

- EFL League One: 2016–17
- EFL Championship runner-up: 2018–19

Bristol Rovers

- EFL League Two third-place promotion: 2021–22

Inverurie Loco Works

- Aberdeenshire Cup Winners: 2023-24

Individual

- Highland Football League Player of the Year: 2007–08
