= Andreas Arestidou =

English footballer

Personal information
- Full name: Andreas Andrea James Arestidou
- Date of birth: 6 December 1989 (age 36)
- Place of birth: Lambeth, England
- Position: Goalkeeper

Senior career*
Years	Team	Apps	(Gls)
2008–2009	Blackburn Rovers	0	(0)
2008	→ Lancaster City (loan)	3	(0)
2008	→ Nantwich Town (loan)	1	(0)
2008	→ Newcastle United (loan)	0	(0)
2009–2010	Shrewsbury Town	2	(0)
2010–2012	Preston North End	7	(0)
2012–2015	Morecambe	24	(0)
2015–2016	Fleetwood Town	0	(0)

International career
2004–2005	England U17	4	(0)
- * Club domestic league appearances and goals as of 15:24, 27 March 2015 (UTC)

Andreas Andrea James Arestidou (born 6 December 1989) is an English professional footballer who plays as a goalkeeper.

== Playing career ==
Arestidou made his debut first team appearance against AFC Telford United at the New Bucks Head in a mid-season Shropshire FA Cup Final 2–1 win on 17 November 2009. Arestidou then made his league debut in a match in the 2009–10 season, starting in the Shrews' 1–1 draw at home to Bury. He was a regular in the reserve team during the 2008–09 season.

He was released on 14 May 2010.

He then joined Preston on trial and played in the pre-season friendly against Chorley. Arestidou then signed a one-year deal. Despite him not appearing for the first team in 2010–11, he did enough to earn an additional year's contract and broke into the first team after first choice goalkeeper Iain Turner broke a toe. He made his competitive debut for Preston in a League Cup game at Charlton on 13 September 2011, keeping a clean sheet, before going on to be on the winning side in five of his seven senior Preston appearances. The most notable match was a Football League Trophy game against his home town club which went to penalties. After gifting a goal to Morecambe in normal time, he kept Preston in the cup by saving two consecutive penalties from Izak Reid and Kevin Ellison, either of which would have won the match for Morecambe after misses by his teammates Clarke Carlisle and Ian Ashbee respectively.

Following an injury to first choice goalkeeper, Turner's foot, Arestidou became first choice during Turner absence. However, it was short lived as he was replaced by signing Thorsten Stuckmann, after Arestidou conceded five goals against Charlton in a 5–2 loss. In May 2012, Arestidou was released from the club after being told his contract would not be renewed.

== International career ==
Arestidou made four appearances for the England under-17 side between 2004 and 2005, playing in the Nordic Cup.
