= Scott Leather =

English footballer

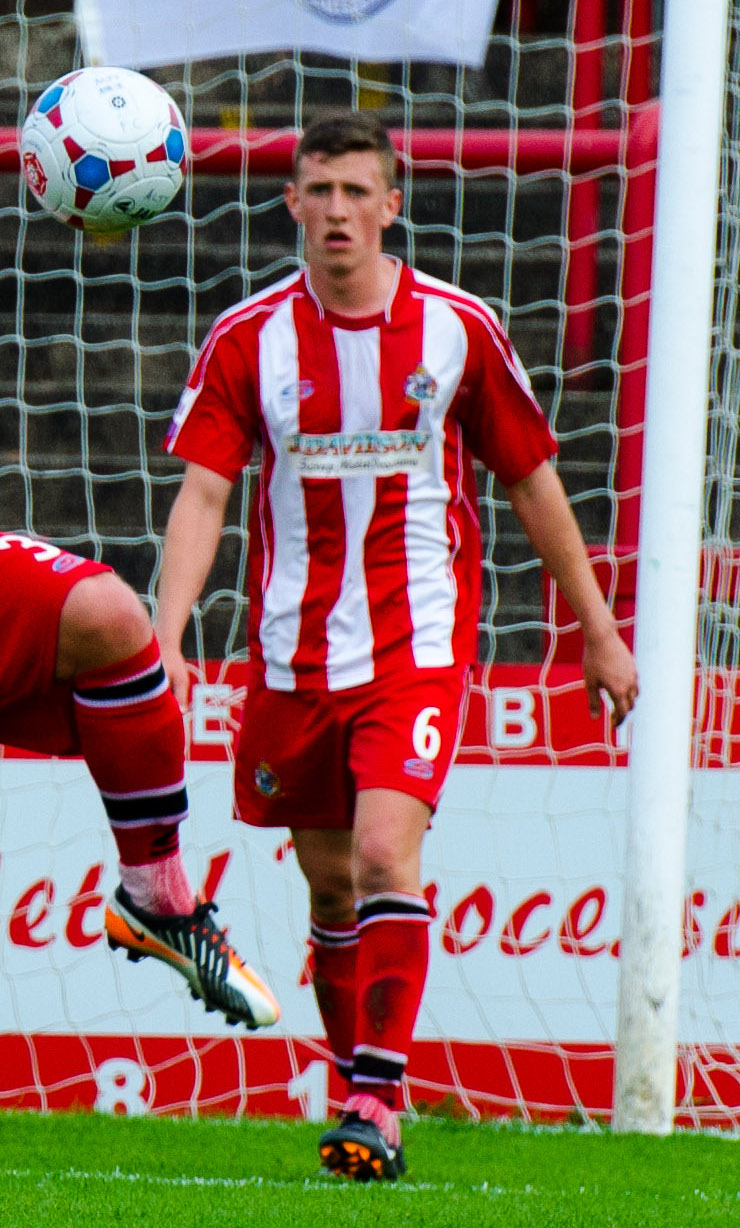
- Leather playing for Altrincham in 2013

Personal information
- Full name: Scott Ashley Leather
- Date of birth: 30 September 1992 (age 34)
- Place of birth: Sale, England
- Height: 6 ft 1 in (1.85 m)
- Position: Defender

Team information
- Current team: Chorley
- Number: 5

Youth career
- 2001–2009: Crewe Alexandra
- 2009–2011: Preston North End

Senior career*
Years	Team	Apps	(Gls)
2011–2012	Preston North End	2	(0)
2012–2016	Altrincham	156	(7)
2016–	Chorley	179	(11)
- * Club domestic league appearances and goals as of 15:49, 11 May 2022 (UTC)

Scott Ashley Leather (born 30 September 1992) is an English semi-professional footballer who plays for Chorley as a defender.

== Career ==
Born in Sale, Greater Manchester, Leather was a member of Crewe Alexandra's youth team between the ages of 8 and 16, before moving to Preston North End in 2009. Leather made his first team debut for Preston on 30 April 2011 against Ipswich Town in a 2–1 defeat. In May 2012, Leather was released from the club after being told his contract would not be renewed. He signed for Altrincham in July 2012.

In the summer of 2016 he rejected a new deal at the club, leaving his hometown club after 179 appearances in all competitions. He signed for Chorley in May 2016.

== Career statistics ==
As of match played 16 December 2017

Appearances and goals by club, season and competition
Club	Season	League			FA Cup		League Cup		Other		Total	
Club	Season	Division	Apps	Goals	Apps	Goals	Apps	Goals	Apps	Goals	Apps	Goals
Preston North End	2010–11	Championship	2	0	0	0	0	0	—		2	0
Altrincham	2012–13	Conference North	39	1	3	0	—		5 (Note: One appearances in Cheshire Senior Cup, two in FA Trophy, two in Conference North play-offs)	0	47	1
Altrincham	2013–14	Conference North	37	5	1	0	—		8 (Note: Three appearances in FA Trophy, two in Cheshire Senior Cup, three in Conference North play-offs)	0	46	5
Altrincham	2014–15	Conference Premier	36	1	2	0	—		1 (Note: Appearances in the FA Trophy)	0	39	1
Altrincham	2015–16	National League	44	0	3	0	—		3	0	50	0
Altrincham	Total		156	7	9	0	—		17	0	182	7
Chorley	2016–17	National League North	43	4	0	0	—		1	0	44	4
Chorley	2017–18	National League North	18	1	3	0	—		1	0	22	1
Chorley	Total		61	5	3	0	—		2	0	66	5
Career total			219	12	12	0	0	0	19	0	250	12

== Honours ==
- Conference North play-offs: 2013–14
