= Danny Devine (footballer, born 1992) =

Irish professional footballer

Daniel Devine
Personal information
- Full name: Daniel Gerard Devine
- Date of birth: 7 September 1992 (age 34)
- Place of birth: Belfast, Northern Ireland
- Position: Centre-back

Team information
- Current team: Inverness Caledonian Thistle
- Number: 6

Youth career
- Lisburn Distillery
- Linfield

Senior career*
Years	Team	Apps	(Gls)
2008–2009	Linfield	0	(0)
2009–2012	Preston North End	15	(1)
2012–2013	Fleetwood Town	0	(0)
2012	→ Wrexham (loan)	4	(0)
2013–2016	Inverness Caledonian Thistle	68	(2)
2016–2018	Partick Thistle	56	(0)
2018–2020	Dunfermline Athletic	47	(2)
2020–	Inverness Caledonian Thistle	170	(7)

International career^{‡}
2010–2011	Northern Ireland U21	2	(0)
- * Club domestic league appearances and goals as of 09:50, 3 May 2026 (UTC) ‡ National team caps and goals as of 18:36, 10 October 2013 (UTC)

Daniel Gerard Devine (born 7 September 1992) is a Northern Irish professional footballer who plays as a centre-back for Scottish Championship club Inverness Caledonian Thistle.

Devine has previously played for Linfield, Preston North End, Fleetwood Town, Wrexham, Partick Thistle and Dunfermline Athletic.

== Career ==
=== Club career ===
Born in Belfast, Devine played youth football with Lisburn Youth FC, Lisburn Distillery and Linfield. He made one senior appearance for Linfield in an Irish League Cup game against Portadown on 17 December 2008 before moving to Preston North End in July 2009. He made his professional debut for Preston on 30 April 2011 in a 2–1 defeat against Ipswich Town. In June 2011, Devine signed a one-year contract with Preston. In May 2012, Devine was released from the club after being told his contract would not be renewed.

He joined Fleetwood Town in the summer of 2012, moving on loan to Wrexham in September 2012. Wrexham offered Devine a permanent long-term contract, but he chose to join Scottish Premier League side Inverness Caledonian Thistle, citing his desire to work with manager Terry Butcher. After Butcher turned down the chance to join Barnsley, Devine said he was relieved that Butcher chose to stay, as Butcher was one of the reasons why he turned down clubs in England.

In March 2013, Devine signed a contract extension, keeping him at the club until the end of the 2014–15 season. A suspension to Gary Warren meant that Devine played for Inverness in their 2015 Scottish Cup Final victory. Soon afterwards, Devine signed a new one-year contract with the club.

Devine left Inverness in 2016 and was then signed by Partick Thistle on a two-year contract. Thistle were relegated via the playoffs at the end of the 2017–18 season. Following that relegation, Devine was one of many players released by Thistle.

Devine then signed with Scottish Championship club Dunfermline Athletic. Devine was released after two seasons with Dunfermline, and subsequently re-signed for fellow Championship side Inverness Caledonian Thistle in August 2020 on a two-year deal.

=== International career ===
Devine represented Northern Ireland at youth international level. In May 2011 the BBC reported that then Northern Ireland manager Nigel Worthington had been informed by Devine that he intended to switch his allegiance to the Republic of Ireland. In March 2018, the then Northern Ireland manager Michael O'Neill said that he would have selected Devine in his Northern Ireland squad for UEFA Euro 2016, but was unable to do so because Devine had signed an international transfer form which committed him to the Republic.

== Career statistics ==
As of 30 April 2021

Appearances and goals by club, season and competition
Club	Season	League			National Cup		League Cup		Other		Total	
Club	Season	Division	Apps	Goals	Apps	Goals	Apps	Goals	Apps	Goals	Apps	Goals
Linfield	2008-09	IFA Premiership	0	0	0	0	1	0	0	0	1	0
Preston North End	2010–11	EFL Championship	2	0	0	0	0	0	—		2	0
Preston North End	2011–12	EFL League One	13	1	0	0	1	0	0	0	14	1
Preston North End	Total		15	1	0	0	1	0	0	0	16	1
Fleetwood Town	2012–13	EFL League Two	0	0	0	0	0	0	0	0	0	0
Wrexham (loan)	2012–13	Conference Premier	4	0	2	0	—		2 (Note: Appearances in the FA Trophy.)	0	8	0
Inverness Caledonian Thistle	2012–13	Scottish Premier League	10	0	0	0	0	0	—		10	0
Inverness Caledonian Thistle	2013–14	Scottish Premiership	13	0	0	0	3	0	—		16	0
Inverness Caledonian Thistle	2014–15	Scottish Premiership	8	0	3	1	0	0	—		11	1
Inverness Caledonian Thistle	2015–16	Scottish Premiership	37	2	4	0	0	0	2 (Note: Appearances in the Europa League.)	0	43	2
Inverness Caledonian Thistle	Total		68	2	7	1	3	0	2	0	80	3
Partick Thistle	2016–17	Scottish Premiership	30	0	3	0	4	0	—		37	0
Partick Thistle	2017–18	Scottish Premiership	26	0	1	0	6	0	1 (Note: Appearance in the Scottish Premiership play-offs.)	0	34	0
Partick Thistle	Total		56	0	4	0	10	0	1	0	71	0
Dunfermline Athletic	2018–19	Scottish Championship	30	1	1	0	5	1	1 (Note: Appearance in the Scottish League Challenge Cup.)	0	37	2
Dunfermline Athletic	2019–20	Scottish Championship	16	1	1	0	0	0	0	0	17	1
Dunfermline Athletic	Total		46	2	2	0	5	1	1	0	54	3
Inverness Caledonian Thistle	2020–21	Scottish Championship	23	0	2	0	3	0	0	0	28	0
Career total			212	5	17	1	22	1	6	0	258	7

== Honours ==
Inverness Caledonian Thistle

- Scottish League One: 2025–26
- Scottish Cup: 2014–15
