= Seanan Clucas =

Northern Irish footballer

Personal information
- Full name: Martin Seanan Clucas
- Date of birth: 8 November 1992 (age 34)
- Place of birth: Dungannon, Northern Ireland
- Height: 1.78 m (5 ft 10 in)
- Position: Midfielder

Team information
- Current team: Carrick Rangers
- Number: 8

Youth career
- Dungannon Swifts
- 2009–2011: Preston North End

Senior career*
Years	Team	Apps	(Gls)
2011–2012	Preston North End	4	(0)
2012	→ Burton Albion (loan)	2	(0)
2012–2014	Bristol Rovers	39	(0)
2014–2015	Linfield	12	(0)
2015	Derry City	12	(1)
2016–2020	Dungannon Swifts	93	(8)
2020–2024	Glentoran	69	(3)
2024-	Carrick Rangers	34	(1)

International career
2008–2010	Northern Ireland U17	5	(0)
2010	Northern Ireland U19	4	(0)
2010–2014	Northern Ireland U21	11	(0)
- * Club domestic league appearances and goals as of 22 February 2026

Martin Seanan Clucas is a Northern Irish footballer who plays as a midfielder for Carrick Rangers in the NIFL Premiership

== Career ==
=== Preston North End ===
On 9 August 2011, he made his debut for Preston North End in a 3–2 victory over Crewe Alexandra in the League Cup first round. He was subbed off for Barry Nicholson after 66 minutes.

=== Burton Albion ===
On 22 March 2012 Clucas signed on loan for Burton Albion until the end of the 2011–12 season. In May 2012, Clucas was released from the club after being told his contract would not be renewed.

=== Bristol Rovers ===
On 5 July 2012, Clucas signed a one-year deal with League Two side Bristol Rovers. He made his debut on 14 August 2012 in a 3–1 loss to Ipswich Town. Following Bristol Rovers' relegation from the Football League, Clucas was released at the end of the 2013-14 League Two season.

=== Linfield ===
On 14 August 2014, Clucas signed for NIFL Premiership club Linfield in his native Northern Ireland.

=== Dungannon ===
In June 2016, Clucas returned home to sign for his hometown club Dungannon Swifts following a brief spell in Australia.

=== Glentoran ===
In June 2020, Clucas signed for NIFL Premiership club Glentoran

=== Carrick Rangers ===
In June 2024, Clucas signed for NIFL Premiership club Carrick Rangers

== Career statistics ==
As of 16 August 2014.

Club	Season	League		Cup		League Cup		Other		Total	
Club	Season	Apps	Goals	Apps	Goals	Apps	Goals	Apps	Goals	Apps	Goals
Preston North End	2011–12	1	0	0	0	3	0	0	0	4	0
Burton Albion	2011–12	2	0	0	0	0	0	0	0	2	0
Bristol Rovers	2012–13	19	0	1	0	1	0	0	0	21	0
Bristol Rovers	2013–14	17	0	1	0	0	0	0	0	18	0
Linfield	2014–15	0	0	0	0	0	0	0	0	0	0
Career total		39	0	2	0	4	0	0	0	45	0
