= Doyle Middleton =

English footballer

Personal information
- Date of birth: 11 April 1994 (age 32)
- Place of birth: Southport, England
- Height: 5 ft 6 in (1.68 m)
- Position: Midfielder

Youth career
- 2007–2012: Preston North End

Senior career*
Years	Team	Apps	(Gls)
2010–2012	Preston North End	3	(0)
2012	Kendal Town	1	(0)
2013	Northwich Victoria		
- * Club domestic league appearances and goals as of 12:53, 12 August 2010 (UTC)

Doyle Middleton (born 11 April 1994) is a footballer. He is a midfielder and a free-agent.

== Career ==
He made his debut for Preston North End on 7 August 2010 in the Football League Cup clash with Stockport County at Edgeley Park, which Preston won 5–0. Middleton came on as a second-half substitute for Paul Hayes. On 30 April 2011 Middleton made his league debut coming on as a second-half substitute against Ipswich Town. Middleton made his first start for PNE against Exeter on 20 August 2011.

== Career statistics ==
Appearances and goals by club, season and competition
Club	Season	League		Cup		League Cup		Europe		Other		Total	
Club	Season	Apps	Goals	Apps	Goals	Apps	Goals	Apps	Goals	Apps	Goals	Apps	Goals
Preston North End	2010–11	2	0	0	0	1	0	0	0	0	0	3	0
Preston North End	Total	2	0	0	0	1	0	0	0	0	0	3	0
Preston North End	Career total	2	0	0	0	1	0	0	0	0	0	3	0

Statistics accurate as of match played 28 August 2010
