= Jamie Douglas (footballer) =

Northern Irish professional footballer

Personal information
- Date of birth: 4 July 1992 (age 34)
- Place of birth: Cookstown, Northern Ireland
- Height: 5 ft 11 in (1.80 m)
- Position: Striker

Team information
- Current team: Loughgall

Youth career
- Dungannon United
- 2008–2011: Preston North End

Senior career*
Years	Team	Apps	(Gls)
2011–2012	Preston North End	6	(1)
2012–2017	Dungannon Swifts	62	(5)
2016	→ Ards (loan)	9	(0)
2017–2018	Loughgall	15	(7)
2018–2019	Portadown		
2019–	Loughgall		
- * Club domestic league appearances and goals as of 11:34, 20 July 2020 (UTC)

Jamie Douglas (born 4 July 1992) is a Northern Irish professional footballer who plays for Loughgall as a striker.

== Career ==
After signing his first professional contract at the end of the 2009-10 season, Douglas made his debut for Preston North End on 1 January 2011, in a 1-2 loss against Derby County. In May 2012, Douglas was released from the club after being told his contract would not be renewed. Later that month, he signed with Dungannon Swifts.

He signed for Loughgall in 2017, and for Portadown in January 2018. On 26 December 2018 he scored 2 goals for Portadown against former club Loughall.

He returned to Loughgall in May 2019.

== Career statistics ==
As of 1 April 2015

Appearances and goals by club, season and competition
Club	Season	League		FA Cup		League Cup		Other		Total	
Club	Season	Apps	Goals	Apps	Goals	Apps	Goals	Apps	Goals	Apps	Goals
Preston North End	2010–11	2	0	1	0	0	0	0	0	3	0
Preston North End	2011–12	4	1	0	0	0	0	0	0	4	1
Preston North End	Total	6	1	1	0	0	0	0	0	7	1
Dungannon Swifts	2012–13	5	0	0	0	0	0	0	0	5	0
Dungannon Swifts	2013–14	18	3	0	0	0	0	0	0	18	3
Dungannon Swifts	2014–15	20	2	2	0	2	0	0	0	24	2
Dungannon Swifts	Total	43	5	2	0	2	0	0	0	43	5
Career total		49	6	3	0	2	0	0	0	54	6
