= Keammar Daley =

Jamaican footballer (born 1988)

Personal information
- Full name: Keammar Rudolph Daley
- Date of birth: 18 February 1988 (age 38)
- Place of birth: Kingston, Jamaica
- Height: 5 ft 8 in (1.73 m)
- Position: Forward

Team information
- Current team: Waterhouse F.C.

Youth career
- 2003–2006: Jamaica College

Senior career*
Years	Team	Apps	(Gls)
2004–2009	Meadhaven	88	(23)
2009–2011	Tivoli Gardens	52	(16)
2011–2013	Preston North End	8	(1)
2013–2015	Tivoli Gardens	1	(1)
2015–2016	Harbour View F.C.	1	(1)
2016–2018	UWI F.C.	10	(1)
2018-	Waterhouse F.C.		

International career^{‡}
2006–2007	Jamaica U20	8	(5)
2007	Jamaica U23	2	(0)
2008–	Jamaica	27	(2)
- * Club domestic league appearances and goals as of 21:22, 28 February 2012 (UTC) ‡ National team caps and goals as of 8 July 2013

Keammar Rudolph Daley (born 18 February 1988) is a Jamaican footballer who is currently plays for Waterhouse F.C. as a forward

== Career ==
=== Club ===
==== Meadhaven United ====
Daley had played with Meadhaven United as a midfielder since 2004 under the guidance of the late coach, David Hunt. Daley bagged 12 goals in the 2008/2009 Digicel Premier League (DPL) season, which led to him winning the Junior Player of the Season award in the DPL. Daley also won the Player of the Season award the same year in the National Under-21 League. For the 2009/2010 DPL season, Daley initially signed with previous champions, Tivoli Gardens FC, on a season-long loan. However, the transfer was later made permanent.

==== Tivoli Gardens FC ====
Daley had a strong 2009/2010 DPL season, leading his team to the end of the first-round final. He has scored 10 goals for Tivoli Gardens as of April 2010. In 2010/2011, Daley led Tivoli Gardens to their fifth Premiere League title.

==== Preston North End ====
After having a successful trial period over the summer, Daley signed a two-year deal for English League 1 club Preston North End on transfer deadline day Wednesday 31 August 2011. He made his debut in the 2–1 defeat against Southampton in the League Cup, but was substituted at half time.

Daley's contract was mutually terminated on 13 January 2013.

=== Tivoli Gardens FC ===
Following his release from Preston North End in early 2013, Daley, in April 2013, returned to Tivoli Gardens.

=== Harbour View FC ===
Daley had a brief stint at Harbour View F.C. from August 2015 – January 2016.

=== UWI FC ===
In January 2016, Daley moved to UWI F.C.

=== Waterhouse F.C. ===
For the 2018-2019 RSPL, Daley moved to Waterhouse F.C.

== International ==
Youth

Keammar Daley was a member of the 2007 U-20 National team at the CONCACAF finals, and also had an outstanding tournament at the 2007 Pan American Games in Rio de Janeiro. His four-goal tally resulted in a silver medal for Jamaica. Daley also appeared for Jamaica's U-23 team in 2007 during an Olympic qualifying match in Haiti.

Senior

Daley is a member of the Jamaica national football team, who made his senior national team debut in July 2008 versus El Salvador. He scored his first senior national team goal for the "Reggae Boyz" in June 2009, in a friendly game against Panama. Daley most recent played for Jamaica in a 2–1 loss to Argentina. He also featured prominently in 2011 for the Reggaeboyz, leading the team to the quarterfinals of the 2011 CONCACAF Gold Cup.
