= Thorsten Stuckmann =

German footballer

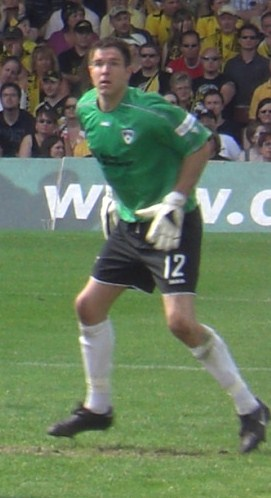
- Stuckmann with Alemannia Aachen in 2008

Personal information
- Date of birth: 17 March 1981 (age 45)
- Place of birth: Gütersloh, West Germany
- Height: 1.99 m (6 ft 6 in)
- Position: Goalkeeper

Youth career
- 1985–1994: SV Neubeckum
- 1994–1996: SpVgg Beckum
- 1996–2000: FC Gütersloh

Senior career*
| Years | Team | Apps | (Gls) |
| 2000–2003 | Preußen Münster | 74 | (0) |
| 2003–2007 | Eintracht Braunschweig | 125 | (0) |
| 2007–2011 | Alemannia Aachen | 82 | (0) |
| 2011–2015 | Preston North End | 57 | (0) |
| 2015–2016 | Doncaster Rovers | 36 | (0) |
| 2016–2017 | Partick Thistle | 5 | (0) |
| 2017 | Chesterfield | 15 | (0) |
| 2017–2018 | Fortuna Düsseldorf II | 7 | (0) |
| Total | | 401 | (0) |
- * Club domestic league appearances and goals

Thorsten Stuckmann (born 17 March 1981) is a German former professional footballer who played as a goalkeeper.

== Career ==
=== Germany ===
Stuckmann played for German clubs SC Preußen Münster, Eintracht Braunschweig and Alemannia Aachen.

=== Preston North End ===
Stuckmann joined English League One club Preston North End in 2011. He kept his first clean sheet in English football in his second game, a goalless draw with Southend United in the FA Cup, and saved a penalty on his Football League debut a week later, in a 1–0 home loss against Rochdale.

He was regarded by Preston fans as being a penalty expert, saving several in his first few games for Preston. He was voted Preston's Player of the Year for the 2011–12 season. During his time at Preston North End he was often used as a backup goalkeeper after the loan signing of Declan Rudd in the 2013–14 season and Sam Johnstone in the second half of the 2014–15 season. He did however secure a run of games following a spell of poor performances from then number 1 keeper Jamie Jones beginning with a clean sheet away at then league leaders Bristol City. During his final season with Preston he became a regular cup goalkeeper, keeping goal in their Football League Trophy run which took them to the Northern area final as well as keeping goal in their successful FA Cup run which included wins against Shrewsbury Town, Norwich City and Sheffield United, culminating in what would be his final start in a home tie against Premier League Manchester United.

=== Doncaster Rovers ===
On 10 June 2015, Stuckmann signed for Doncaster Rovers on a two-year deal. He was transfer listed the following summer following relegation, by first team manager, Darren Ferguson. He then had his contract terminated on 21 July 2016, and the fans took to social media to praise the player for all that he did in his one-year tenure at the club.

=== Partick Thistle ===
Stuckmann signed a short-term contract with Scottish Premiership club Partick Thistle in September 2016. Stuckmann was given the number 35 shirt. He made his debut for the club on 26 October 2016, in a 2–0 away win against Dundee, coming on as a late substitute following an injury to Ryan Scully. He was released by the club on 3 January 2017.

=== Chesterfield ===
Stuckmann signed for Chesterfield in February 2017 on a free transfer after being released by Partick Thistle. Stuckmann made his Chesterfield debut on 18 February 2017 in a 2–1 loss against Bury in EFL League One. He saved a penalty from Ryan Lowe but unfortunately made a mistake and allowed George Miller to score a late goal. He left the club in the summer 2017.

== Honours ==
Preston North End

- Football League One play-offs: 2015
