= Adam Barton (footballer) =

English footballer (born 1991)

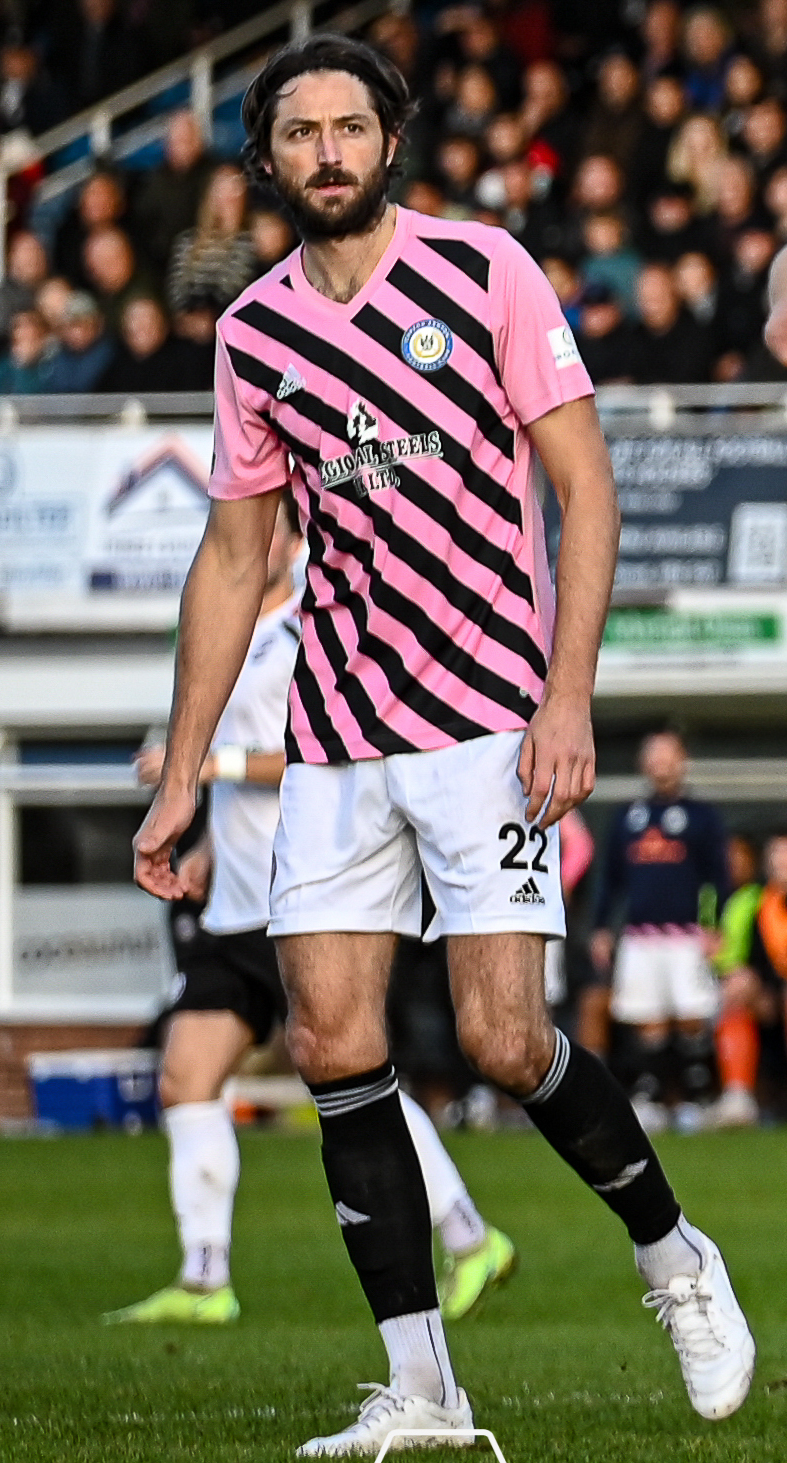
- Adam Barton playing for Curzon Ashton, in 2023

Personal information
- Full name: Adam James Barton
- Date of birth: 7 January 1991 (age 35)
- Place of birth: Clitheroe, England
- Height: 1.93 m (6 ft 4 in)
- Positions: Defensive midfielder; centre back

Team information
- Current team: Curzon Ashton (player-manager)
- Number: 22

Youth career
- Blackburn Rovers
- 2006–2008: Preston North End

Senior career*
Years	Team	Apps	(Gls)
2008–2012	Preston North End	50	(1)
2009	→ Crawley Town (loan)	2	(0)
2012–2015	Coventry City	63	(3)
2014	→ Fleetwood Town (loan)	0	(0)
2015–2016	Portsmouth	21	(0)
2016–2018	Partick Thistle	64	(1)
2018–2019	Dundee United	7	(0)
2019	→ Connah's Quay Nomads (loan)	8	(2)
2019–2020	Wrexham	7	(0)
2020–2021	Farsley Celtic	14	(0)
2021–	Curzon Ashton	194	(13)

International career
2010	Northern Ireland	1	(0)
2011–2012	Republic of Ireland U21	5	(0)

Managerial career
- 2026–: Curzon Ashton (player-manager)
- * Club domestic league appearances and goals as of 13:35, 22 October 2026 (UTC)

Adam James Barton (born 7 January 1991) is a professional footballer who plays as a defensive midfielder or centre back for Curzon Ashton, where he holds the role of player-manager.

Born in England, he has played internationally for both Northern Ireland, in a senior friendly, and Republic of Ireland at under-21 level.

== Club career ==
=== Preston North End ===
Born in Clitheroe, Barton started in the youth ranks at Blackburn Rovers before being released at the age of sixteen due to a serious back injury. Although originally seen as a gamble due to his injury, Preston North End gave Barton a youth scholarship and his performances at youth and reserve team level earned him a two-and-a-half-year contract in December 2008.

In the 2009–10 season, Barton moved to Conference National side Crawley Town on a one-month loan. After making two appearances for the club he returned to Preston, where he made an appearance in the club's reserve side. Due to manager Darren Ferguson starting to use youngsters in the first team, Barton made his full debut in a home 3–2 win over Scunthorpe United on 10 April 2010, being replaced at half-time due to a head injury.

At the start of the 2010–11 season, Barton signed a two-year contract to keep him at Preston until 2013. He scored his first goal in the 4–3 defeat to Burnley in September 2010. After scoring his first goal, Barton established himself in the first team, where he made thirty-five appearances in all competitions, scoring once. However, Barton was unable to help the club avoid relegation to League One.

Ahead of the 2011–12 season, Barton was linked with Wolverhampton Wanderers and Blackburn Rovers. Despite this, newly appointed manager Phil Brown said he believed Barton could be a key figure to the club this season, quoting: "That is the position for him, sitting in front of the back four and making us play, like an orchestra leader. He has got that ability but he has to demand the ball and get on it more times." However, Barton's season didn't go as planned, as he mostly spent time on the bench at the start of the season. He scored his first goal of the season, in the League Cup third round, in a 2–1 loss against Southampton.

On 25 February 2012, Barton suffered a suspected triple leg break and a dislocated ankle in a 0–0 draw against Walsall after making a challenge with Walsall's Richard Taundry. As a result of his injury, new Preston manager Graham Westley said he believed Barton would come back stronger once he had recovered, while Taundry said he believed the tackle was innocuous, though he wished Barton a speedy recovery. Following surgery Barton was ruled out for the remainder of the season.

=== Coventry City ===
On 6 August 2012, Barton signed a three-year contract with Coventry City. He made his league debut for the club, in the opening game of the season as Coventry drew 1–1 with Yeovil Town. Three weeks after signing for the club, he scored his first goal, in a 2–2 draw against Bury. He finished the season with 3 goals in 22 League games.

On 27 March 2014, Barton joined League Two side Fleetwood Town on loan for the remainder of the 2013–14 season. After making 27 League appearances for Coventry in the 2014–15 season, he was released by the club at the end of the season.

=== Portsmouth ===
On 24 June 2015 Barton signed a two-year deal with Portsmouth.

=== Partick Thistle ===
Barton signed for Scottish Premiership club Partick Thistle on 31 August 2016 on a three year deal, moving for an undisclosed transfer fee. He scored his first Partick Thistle goal in a 2–1 home defeat to Aberdeen, scoring a header from a corner into the top left corner of the goal. He was also awarded Man of the Match for his performance. On 9 November 2016, Barton was named as Premiership Player of the Month for October 2016. In the same month Barton also won Partick Thistle's McCrea Financial Services Player of the Month award as voted for by the Partick Thistle supporters. Barton scored his second Thistle goal in a 1–0 away win over St Johnstone in the Scottish Cup. In May 2017 Barton was named the club's player of the Year in his first season with Thistle.

=== Dundee United ===
Following Partick Thistle's relegation from the Premiership, Barton signed a two-year contract with Scottish Championship club Dundee United in July 2018.

=== Connah's Quay Nomads (loan) ===
In January 2019 he switched to the Welsh Premier League signing on loan for Connah's Quay Nomads.

=== Wrexham ===
On 4 July 2019, Barton signed for Wrexham on a two-year deal. Barton left Wrexham in February 2020 having made 10 appearances in all competitions.

=== Farsley Celtic ===
On 18 December 2020, Barton moved to National League North club Farsley Celtic.

=== Curzon Ashton ===
In November 2021 he joined Curzon Ashton.

Barton signed a new two year deal with Curzon Ashton in June 2025.

On 20 March 2026, Barton was named player-manager of the club.

== International career ==
Barton was named in a Northern Ireland squad in September 2010, having previously been named in an under-21 squad, qualifying for the country through his parents. He withdrew from the squad the day after its announcement, in order to remain eligible for the England team, which would have no longer been the case had he represented Northern Ireland in a competitive fixture. On 12 November 2010 Barton was called up for Northern Ireland's friendly against Morocco after a number of withdrawals, playing the full 90 minutes in the 1–1 draw on 17 November.

On 15 March 2011, more question marks over Barton's international status were raised when he was called up to Noel King's Republic of Ireland under-21 squad for a friendly match against Portugal, making his debut appearance and playing the full 90 minutes for them in that game on 26 March 2011.

== Career statistics ==
As of matches played 27 September 2022

Appearances and goals by club, season and competition
Club	Season	League			National Cup (Note: Includes FA Cup, Scottish Cup. Welsh Cup)		League Cup (Note: Includes EFL Cup, Scottish League Cup)		Other		Total	
Club	Season	Division	Apps	Goals	Apps	Goals	Apps	Goals	Apps	Goals	Apps	Goals
Preston North End	2008–09	Championship	0	0	0	0	0	0	0	0	0	0
Preston North End	2009–10	Championship	1	0	0	0	0	0	—		1	0
Preston North End	2010–11	Championship	33	1	0	0	2	0	—		35	1
Preston North End	2011–12	League One	16	0	1	0	3	1	2 (Note: Appearances in the Football League Trophy)	1	22	2
Preston North End	Total		50	1	1	0	5	1	2	1	58	3
Crawley Town (loan)	2009–10	Conference Premier	2	0	—		—		—		2	0
Coventry City	2012–13	League One	22	3	2	0	2	0	0	0	26	3
Coventry City	2013–14	League One	14	0	2	0	0	0	1	0	17	0
Coventry City	2014–15	League One	27	0	1	0	0	0	2	0	30	0
Coventry City	Total		63	3	5	0	2	0	3	0	73	3
Fleetwood Town (loan)	2013–14	League Two	0	0	—		—		—		0	0
Portsmouth	2015–16	League Two	16	0	2	0	0	0	3 (Note: One appearance in the Football League Trophy and two in the League Two play-offs)	0	21	0
Portsmouth	2016–17	League Two	3	0	—		1	0	1 (Note: Appearance in the EFL Trophy)	0	5	0
Portsmouth	Total		19	0	2	0	1	0	4	0	26	0
Partick Thistle	2016–17	Scottish Premiership	31	1	3	1	—		—		34	2
Partick Thistle	2017–18	Scottish Premiership	33	0	2	0	6	0	2 (Note: Two appearances in the Scottish Premiership play-offs)	0	43	0
Partick Thistle	Total		64	1	5	1	6	0	2	0	77	2
Dundee United	2018–19	Scottish Championship	7	0	0	0	3	1	0	0	10	1
Connah's Quay Nomads (loan)	2018–19	Cymru Premier	8	2	3	0	—		2 (Note: Two appearances in the Scottish Challenge Cup)	0	13	2
Wrexham	2019–20	National League	7	0	2	0	—		2 (Note: One appearance in the Scottish Challenge Cup, one in FA Trophy)	0	11	0
Farsley Celtic	2020–21	National League North	4	0	—		—		—		4	0
Farsley Celtic	2021–22	National League North	10	0	1	0	—		—		11	0
Farsley Celtic	Total		14	0	1	0	—		—		15	0
Curzon Ashton	2021–22	National League North	29	0	—		—		2 (Note: Appearances in the FA Trophy)	0	31	0
Curzon Ashton	2022–23	National League North	9	0	1	0	—		0	0	10	0
Curzon Ashton	Total		38	0	1	0	—		2	0	41	0
Career totals			272	7	20	1	17	2	17	1	326	11

== Honours ==
=== Individual ===
- Scottish Premiership Player of the Month (1): October 2016
