= 2012–13 Accrington Stanley F.C. season =

Accrington Stanley F.C.
2012–13 season
- Chairman: Peter Marsden
- Manager: Paul Cook (until 25 Oct.); Leam Richardson (from 25 Oct.)
- Stadium: Crown Ground
- League Two: 18th
- FA Cup: Second round
- League Cup: First round
- FL Trophy: First round
- Top goalscorer: League: Romauld Boco (9); All: Romauld Boco (9)
- Highest home attendance: 3,010 vs Bradford City, 8 September
- Lowest home attendance: 1,031 vs Dagenham & Redbridge, 5 January
- Average home league attendance: 1,539
Home colours	Away colours

The 2012–13 season was Accrington Stanley's 44th season in their existence. Along with competing in League One, the club also participated in the FA Cup, Football League Cup and Football League Trophy. The season covered the period from 1 July 2012 to 30 June 2013.

== League Two ==
=== Standings ===
Pos	Team	Pld	W	D	L	GF	GA	GD	Pts
16	Morecambe	46	15	13	18	55	61	−6	58
17	York City	46	12	19	15	50	60	−10	55
18	Accrington Stanley	46	14	12	20	51	68	−17	54
19	Torquay United	46	13	14	19	55	62	−7	53
20	AFC Wimbledon	46	14	11	21	54	76	−22	53

Updated to match(es) played on 27 April 2013. Source: BBC Sport
Rules for classification: 1) Points; 2) Goal difference; 3) Number of goals scored

=== Results summary ===
Overall								Home						Away					
Pld	W	D	L	GF	GA	GD	Pts	W	D	L	GF	GA	GD	W	D	L	GF	GA	GD
46	14	12	20	51	68	−17	54	7	7	9	28	34	−6	7	5	11	23	34	−11

Last updated: 14 May 2013.
Source: Soccernet

=== Result round by round ===
Round	1	2	3	4	5	6	7	8	9	10	11	12	13	14	15	16	17	18	19	20	21	22	23	24	25	26	27	28	29	30	31	32	33	34	35	36	37	38	39	40	41	42	43	44	45	46
Ground	A	H	H	A	H	A	A	H	A	H	A	A	H	H	A	H	A	A	H	H	A	H	H	A	A	H	H	A	A	A	H	A	H	A	H	A	H	H	H	A	A	H	A	H	A	H
Result	W	W	L	W	D	D	L	W	W	L	L	L	L	W	D	L	D	W	D	L	L	L	D	L	L	W	L	L	D	L	D	L	D	W	D	L	L	W	W	L	W	D	D	W	W	L
Position	10	3	7	4	5	5	6	6	4	9	11	16	16	16	12	13	16	16	14	14	17	19	17	18	19	17	18	19	19	20	20	21	23	22	22	23	24	24	22	22	20	20	20	18	17	18

A = Away; H = Home; W = Win; D = Draw; L = Loss

== Squad ==
=== Statistics ===
As of 27 April 2013

No.	Pos	Nat	Player	Total		League Two		FA Cup		League Cup		League Trophy	
No.	Pos	Nat	Player	Apps	Goals	Apps	Goals	Apps	Goals	Apps	Goals	Apps	Goals
1	GK	(United States) USA	Paul Rachubka (on loan from Leeds United)	23	0	21	0	2	0	0	0	0	0
2	DF	(England) ENG	Peter Murphy	50	5	42+3	5	3	0	1	0	1	0
3	DF	(Republic of Ireland) IRL	Michael Liddle	36	0	27+5	0	3	0	1	0	0	0
4	MF	(England) ENG	Luke Joyce	48	0	44	0	3	0	1	0	0	0
5	DF	(England) ENG	Mark Hughes (on loan from Bury)	5	0	5	0	0	0	0	0	0	0
6	DF	(England) ENG	Dean Winnard	43	1	39+1	1	3	0	0	0	0	0
7	FW	(England) ENG	Craig Lindfield	33	2	18+11	1	2	1	1	0	1	0
8	MF	(England) ENG	Charlie Barnett	17	0	6+8	0	0+1	0	1	0	1	0
9	FW	(England) ENG	Francis Jeffers	7	2	4+3	2	0	0	0	0	0	0
10	MF	(England) ENG	Will Hatfield	34	6	23+9	2	1	4	0+1	0	0	0
11	MF	(England) ENG	Aidan Chippendale	8	0	2+4	0	0	0	1	0	1	0
12	MF	(England) ENG	George Miller	28	3	22+3	3	2	0	1	0	0	0
13	DF	(England) ENG	Leam Richardson	0	0	0	0	0	0	0	0	0	0
14	DF	(England) ENG	Luke Clark	9	0	2+4	0	1	0	1	0	1	0
15	MF	(England) ENG	Bohan Dixon	8	0	1+5	0	0+1	0	0	0	0+1	0
16	DF	(England) ENG	Nicky Hunt (on loan from Rotherham United)	11	0	11	0	0	0	0	0	0	0
17	MF	(Northern Ireland) NIR	James Gray	19	2	8+9	2	0+1	0	0	0	1	0
18	MF	(England) ENG	Tom Eckersley	4	0	1+1	0	0	0	0+1	0	1	0
19	FW	(England) ENG	Marcus Carver	11	0	1+10	0	0	0	0	0	0	0
21	FW	(England) ENG	James Beattie	27	7	18+7	6	2	1	0	0	0	0
22	GK	(England) ENG	Andrew Dawber	2	0	0+2	0	0	0	0	0	0	0
23	FW	(Republic of Ireland) IRL	Pádraig Amond	39	9	24+12	9	2+1	0	0	0	0	0
24	DF	(England) ENG	Lee Molyneux	43	9	33+6	8	2+1	1	0	0	1	0
25	GK	(England) ENG	Ian Dunbavin	23	0	20	0	1	0	1	0	1	0
26	DF	(England) ENG	Tom Aldred	14	0	13+1	0	0	0	0	0	0	0
27	MF	(Democratic Republic of the Congo) COD	Amine Linganzi	13	0	10+3	0	0	0	0	0	0	0
30	MF	(England) ENG	Piero Mingoia (on loan from Watford)	9	1	4+3	1	0+2	0	0	0	0	0
33	MF	(Benin) BEN	Romuald Boco	45	10	42	10	3	0	0	0	0	0
34	DF	(England) ENG	Laurence Wilson	19	0	19	0	0	0	0	0	0	0
Players currently on loan:
	MF	(England) ENG	Ryan Hopper (on loan at Droylsden)	0	0	0	0	0	0	0	0	0	0
Players that left during the season:
1	GK	(England) ENG	Cameron Belford (on loan from Bury)	5	0	5	0	0	0	0	0	0	0
5	DF	(Democratic Republic of the Congo) COD	Aristote Nsiala	20	0	15+2	0	2	0	1	0	0	0
9	FW	(Republic of Ireland) IRL	Karl Sheppard (on loan from Reading)	12	1	5+5	1	0	0	1	0	1	0
16	FW	(Nigeria) NGR	Osayamen Osawe (on loan from Blackburn Rovers)	3	0	0+2	0	0+1	0	0	0	0	0
20	FW	(England) ENG	Jack Sampson (on loan from Bolton Wanderers)	5	0	2+3	0	0	0	0	0	0	0
26	MF	(England) ENG	Ryan Watson (on loan from Wigan Athletic)	1	0	0	0	0	0	0	0	1+0	0
26	MF	(England) ENG	Matthew Whichelow (on loan from Watford)	4	0	2+2	0	0	0	0	0	0	0
28	MF	(England) ENG	Danny Schofield (on loan from Rotherham United)	8	0	6+2	0	0	0	0	0	0	0
29	DF	(England) ENG	Rob Atkinson (on loan from Fleetwood Town)	13	0	12+0	0	1	0	0	0	0	0
30	FW	(England) ENG	Adam Dawson (on loan from Wigan Athletic)	1	0	0	0	0	0	0+1	0	0	0

==== Goalscoring record ====
Rank	No.	Po.	Name	League Two	FA Cup	League Cup	League Trophy	Total
1	33	MF	Romuald Boco	10	0	0	0	10
2	23	FW	Pádraig Amond	9	0	0	0	9
2	24	DF	Lee Molyneux	8	1	0	0	9
4	21	FW	James Beattie	6	1	0	0	7
5	10	MF	Will Hatfield	2	4	0	0	6
6	2	DF	Peter Murphy	5	0	0	0	5
7	12	MF	George Miller	3	0	0	0	3
8	17	MF	James Gray	2	0	0	0	2
8	9	FW	Francis Jeffers	2	0	0	0	2
8	7	FW	Craig Lindfield	1	1	0	0	2
11	30	MF	Piero Mingoia	1	0	0	0	1
11	~~9~~	FW	Karl Sheppard	1	0	0	0	1
11	6	DF	Dean Winnard	1	0	0	0	1
Total				51	7	0	0	58

==== Disciplinary record ====
No.	Pos.	Name	League Two		FA Cup		League Cup		League Trophy		Total	
No.	Pos.	Name	Yellow card	Red card	Yellow card	Red card	Yellow card	Red card	Yellow card	Red card	Yellow card	Red card
~~1~~	GK	Cameron Belford	1	0	0	0	0	0	0	0	1	0
~~1~~	GK	Paul Rachubka	0	1	0	0	0	0	0	0	1	0
2	DF	Peter Murphy	6	0	0	0	0	0	0	0	6	0
3	DF	Michael Liddle	4	1	0	0	1	0	0	0	5	1
4	MF	Luke Joyce	3	0	0	0	0	0	0	0	3	0
~~5~~	DF	Aristote Nsiala	8	0	2	0	1	0	0	0	11	0
6	DF	Dean Winnard	7	1	1	0	0	0	0	0	8	1
7	MF	Craig Lindfield	4	0	0	0	0	0	0	0	4	0
8	MF	Charlie Barnett	1	1	0	0	0	0	1	0	2	1
9	FW	Francis Jeffers	1	0	0	0	0	0	0	0	1	0
10	MF	Will Hatfield	2	0	0	0	0	0	0	0	2	0
12	MF	George Miller	3	0	0	0	0	0	0	0	3	0
15	MF	Bohan Dixon	2	0	0	0	0	0	1	0	3	0
16	DF	Nicky Hunt	4	0	0	0	0	0	0	0	4	0
17	MF	James Gray	1	0	0	0	0	0	0	0	1	0
18	DF	Tom Eckersley	1	0	0	0	0	0	0	0	1	0
21	FW	James Beattie	1	0	0	0	0	0	0	0	1	0
23	FW	Padraig Amond	1	0	0	0	0	0	0	0	1	0
24	DF	Lee Molyneux	7	1	0	0	0	0	0	0	7	1
26	DF	Tom Aldred	2	0	0	0	0	0	0	0	2	0
28	MF	Danny Schofield	1	0	0	0	0	0	0	0	1	0
29	DF	Rob Atkinson	1	0	0	0	0	0	0	0	1	0
33	FW	Romauld Boco	1	0	0	0	0	0	0	0	1	0
34	DF	Laurence Wilson	1	0	0	0	0	0	0	0	1	0
Total			61	5	3	0	2	0	2	0	68	5

=== Contracts ===
No.	Pos.	Nat.	Name	Age	Status	Contract length	Expiry date	Source
25	GK	(England)	Ian Dunbavin	31	Signed	1 year	June 2013	BBC Sport
7	FW	(England)	Craig Lindfield	23	Signed	1 year	June 2013	BBC Sport
10	MF	(England)	Will Hatfield	20	Signed	1 year	June 2013	BBC Sport
8	MF	(England)	Charlie Barnett	23	Signed	1 year	June 2013	Lancashire Telegraph
21	FW	(England)	James Beattie	34	Signed	6 months	June 2013	BBC Sport
19	FW	(England)	Marcus Carver	19	Signed	1 1/2 years	June 2014	BBC Sport
9	FW	(England)	Francis Jeffers	45	Signed	3 months	June 2013	Official Site

== Transfers ==
=== In ===
No.	Pos.	Nat.	Name	Age	EU	Moving from	Type	Transfer window	Ends	Transfer fee	Source
19	FW	(England)	Marcus Carver	18	EU	Youth system	Promoted	Summer	2013	Youth system	
20	MF	(England)	Ryan Hopper	18	EU	Youth system	Promoted	Summer	2013	Youth system	
21	MF	(England)	Adam Stockdale	?	EU	Youth system	Promoted	Summer	2013	Youth system	
15	MF	(England)	Bohan Dixon	22	EU		Free Transfer	Summer	2013	N/A	
12	MF	(England)	George Miller	20	EU	Preston North End	Free Transfer	Summer	2013	Free	
16	MF	(England)	Liam Hatch	18	EU	Liverpool	Free Transfer	Summer	2013	Free	
14	DF	(England)	Luke Clark	18	EU	Preston North End	Free Transfer	Summer	2013	Free	
3	DF	(Republic of Ireland) (England)	Michael Liddle	22	EU	Sunderland	Transfer	Summer	2013	Undisclosed	
11	MF	(England)	Aidan Chippendale	20	EU	Huddersfield Town	Free Transfer	Summer	2013	Free	
18	DF	(England)	Tom Eckersley	20	EU	Bolton Wanderers	Free Transfer	Summer	2013	Free	
	FW	(Northern Ireland)	James Gray	20	EU	Kettering Town	Free Transfer	Summer	2013	Free	
24	DF	(England)	Lee Molyneux	23	EU	Free agent	Free Transfer	Summer	Non-Contract	Free	
23	FW	(Republic of Ireland)	Pádraig Amond	24	EU	Paços de Ferreira (Portugal)	Free Transfer	Summer	2013	Free	
33	MF	(Benin) (France)	Romuald Boco	27	EU	Sligo Rovers (Republic of Ireland)	Transfer	Summer	2013	Undisclosed	
34	DF	(England)	Laurence Wilson	26	EU	Rotherham United	Free Transfer	Winter	2013	Free	
26	DF	(England)	Tom Aldred	22	EU	Colchester United	Free Transfer	Winter	2013	Free	
27	MF	(Democratic Republic of the Congo)	Amine Linganzi	23	EU	Free agent	Free Transfer		2013	Free	
9	FW	(England)	Francis Jeffers	45	EU	Free agent	Free Transfer	Winter	2013	Free	

=== Loans in ===
No.	Pos.	Name	Country	Age	Loan club	Started	Ended	Start source	End source
9	FW	Karl Sheppard	(Republic of Ireland)	35	Reading	6 August	January		
26	MF	Ryan Atkinson	(England)	19	Wigan Athletic	10 August	15 September		
30	MF	Adam Dawson	(England)	34	Wigan Athletic	12 August	31 August		
28	MF	Danny Schofield	(England)	32	Rotherham United	12 September	December		
30	MF	Piero Mingoia	(England)	35	Watford	17 September			
26	MF	Matthew Whichelow	(England)	21	Watford	17 September	21 December		
29	DF	Rob Atkinson	(England)	25	Fleetwood Town	21 September	28 November		
20	FW	Jack Sampson	(England)	19	Bolton Wanderers	11 October	11 November		
16	FW	Osayamen Osawe	(Nigeria)	19	Blackburn Rovers	26 October	26 November		
1	GK	Paul Rachubka	(United States)	31	Leeds United	1 December	29 December		
1	GK	Cameron Belford	(England)	24	Bury	29 December	10 January		
16	DF	Nicky Hunt	(England)	43	Rotherham United	1 January	30 May		
1	GK	Cameron Belford	(England)	24	Bury	11 January	31 January		
1	GK	Paul Rachubka	(England)	45	Leeds United	31 January	30 May		
	DF	Hughes	(England)	39	Bury	31 January	30 May		

Sources: For loan start source see "Start source". For loan end source see "End source".
EU = if holds or not a European Union passport; Country: when 2 flags, 1st flag = country that plays for internationally, 2nd flag = country of birth; No. = number on jersey; P = Position (for position name, pause mouse pointer on abbreviation); Name = Name on jersey (for more extensive name, pause mouse pointer on name); In/Out = In: The player came in on loan, Out: The player went out on loan; Loan club = the club that the player moved on loan to or the club that the player came from on loan; Started = the date when the player's loan started; Ended = the date when the player's loan ended.

=== Out ===
No.	Pos.	Name	Country	Age	Type	Moving to	Transfer window	Transfer fee	Apps	Goals	Source
2	DF	Danny Coid	(England)	30	Contract Ended		Summer	Free	22	1	
15	MF	Alan Burton	(England)	21	Out of Contract	Marine	Summer	Free	2	0	
9	FW	Kurtis Guthrie	(Jersey)	19	Contract Ended	Welling United	Summer	Free	15	0	
18	DF	Liam Willis	(England)	19	Contract Ended	Southport	Summer	Free	2	0	
14	MF	Kevin McIntyre	(England)	34	Free Transfer	Rochdale	Summer	Free	49	2	
10	MF	Ian Craney	(England)	30	Contract Ended	Rochdale	Summer	Free	46	8	
5	DF	Aristote Nsiala	(Democratic Republic of the Congo)	20	Contract Terminated		Winter	Free	39	0	

EU = if holds or not a European Union passport; Country: when 2 flags, 1st flag = country that plays for internationally, 2nd flag = country of birth; N = number on jersey; P = Position (for position name, pause mouse pointer on abbreviation); Name = Name on jersey (for more extensive name, pause mouse pointer on name); Age = age on the day of the signing; Moving from = only indicate the club the player was playing before start playing for this club in this season, for the type of the moving see Status column; Moving to = only indicates the club the player is going to play next, for the type of the moving see Status column; Ends = when the player's current contract ends; n/a = Not applicable; Apps = Total number of competitive appearances (including substitute appearances) at the club prior to departure; Goals = Total number of competitive goals scored at the club prior to departure.

=== Loans Out ===
No.	Pos.	Name	Country	Age	Loan club	Started	Ended	Start source	End source
19	FW	Marcus Carver	(England)	19	Marine	15 August	15 November		
20	MF	Ryan Hopper	(England)	18	Droylsden	16 August	16 September		
18	DF	Tom Eckersley	(England)	20	Stockport County	5 October	5 November		
17	FW	James Gray	(Northern Ireland) (England)	20	Vauxhall Motors	5 October	5 November		

Sources: For loan start source see "Start source". For loan end source see "End source".
EU = if holds or not a European Union passport; Country: when 2 flags, 1st flag = country that plays for internationally, 2nd flag = country of birth; No. = number on jersey; P = Position (for position name, pause mouse pointer on abbreviation); Name = Name on jersey (for more extensive name, pause mouse pointer on name); In/Out = In: The player came in on loan, Out: The player went out on loan; Loan club = the club that the player moved on loan to or the club that the player came from on loan; Started = the date when the player's loan started; Ended = the date when the player's loan ended.

== Results ==
=== League Two ===
18 August 2012 1	Southend United	0–1	Accrington Stanley	Southend-on-Sea
15:00			61' Sheppard	Stadium: Roots Hall; Attendance: 4,673

21 August 2012 2	Accrington Stanley	2–0	Port Vale	Accrington
19:45	Amond 43' (pen.); Gray 90'			Stadium: Crown Ground; Attendance: 1,947

25 August 2012 3	Accrington Stanley	0–3	Exeter City	Accrington
15:00			14', 54' Gow; 90' Bauzà	Stadium: Crown Ground; Attendance: 1,149

1 September 4	Cheltenham Town	0–3	Accrington Stanley	Cheltenham
15:00			4' Amond; 33' Miller; 47' Boco	Stadium: Whaddon Road; Attendance: 2,708

8 September 5	Accrington Stanley	1–1	Bradford City	Accrington
15:00	Amond 73'		83' Connell	Stadium: Crown Ground; Attendance: 3,010

15 September 6	Dagenham & Redbridge	1–1	Accrington Stanley	London
15:00	Howell 61'		85' Murphy	Stadium: Victoria Road; Attendance: 1,529

18 September 7	Chesterfield	4–3	Accrington Stanley	Chesterfield
19:45	Lester 8', 66'; Richards 11'; Forbes 84'		28', 76' Boco; 58' Murphy; 83' Liddle	Stadium: Proact Stadium; Attendance: 4,359

22 September 8	Accrington Stanley	1–0	Aldershot Town	Accrington
15:00	Amond 90'		(yellow card) 90+2' (yellow-red card) Vincenti	Stadium: Crown Ground; Attendance: 1,379

29 September 9	AFC Wimbledon	1–2	Accrington Stanley	London
15:00	S Moore 90+2'		25' Amond; 78' Murphy	Stadium: Kingsmeadow; Attendance: 3,405

2 October	Accrington Stanley	P–P	Rotherham United	Accrington
19:45				Stadium: Crown Ground

6 October 10	Accrington Stanley	2–3	Rochdale	Accrington
15:00	Mingoia 37'; Boco 47'		1' Donnelly; 32' (pen.) Grimes; 83' Kennedy	Stadium: Crown ground Attendance: 2,678

13 October 11	Torquay United	3–1	Accrington Stanley	Torquay
	Howe 5' (pen.); Bodin 67'; Mansell 80'		65' Amond	Stadium: Plainmoor; Attendance: 2,474

20 October 12	Oxford United	5–0	Accrington Stanley	Oxford
	Tom Craddock 23', 36', 71'; Potter 78'			Stadium: Kassam Stadium; Attendance: 5,403

23 October 13	Accrington Stanley	0–1	York City	Accrington
			83' Walker	Stadium: Crown Ground; Attendance: 1,506

27 October 14	Accrington Stanley	1–0	Bristol Rovers	Accrington
	Amond 79'			Stadium: Crown Ground; Attendance: 1,462

6 November 15	Morecambe	0–0	Accrington Stanley	Morecambe
				Stadium: Globe Arena; Attendance: 1,410

10 November 16	Accrington Stanley	2–4	Northampton Town	Accrington
	Miller 37'; Boco 57'		17', 69', 76' Akinfenwa; 67' Robinson	Stadium: Crown Ground; Attendance: 1,441

16 November 17	Barnet	1–1	Accrington Stanley	London
	Byrne 71' (pen.); Davids (yellow card) 78' (yellow-red card)		53' Boco	Stadium: Underhill Stadium; Attendance: 2,238

20 November 18	Fleetwood Town	1–3	Accrington Stanley	Fleetwood
	McGuire 67'		9' (pen.) Beattie; 17' Miller; 62' Boco	Stadium: Highbury Stadium; Attendance: 2,472

24 November 19	Accrington Stanley	1–1	Gillingham	Accrington
	Beattie 72' (pen.)		42' Weston; (red card) 72' Nelson	Stadium: Crown Ground; Attendance: 1,624

27 November 20	Accrington Stanley	1–2	Rotherham United	Accrington
	Winnard 2'		5', 48' Nardiello	Stadium: Crown Ground; Attendance: 1,424

9 December 21	Burton Albion	1–0	Accrington Stanley	Burton-on-Trent
	Kee 10'			Stadium: Pirelli Stadium; Attendance: 2,530

15 December 22	Accrington Stanley	0–2	Wycombe Wanderers	Accrington
			11' Andrade; 34' (yellow card) 50' (yellow-red card) 56' McClure	Stadium: Crown Ground; Attendance: 1,050

22 December 23	Accrington Stanley	1–1	Plymouth Argyle	Accrington
	Beattie 52'		27' Bhasera	Stadium: Crown Ground; Attendance: 2,012

26 December 24	Bradford City	2–1	Accrington Stanley	Bradford
	Thompson 24'; Connell 86'		(red card) 67' Winnard; 79' Boco	Stadium: Valley Parade; Attendance: 11,181

29 December 25	Rotherham United	4–1	Accrington Stanley	Rotherham
	Eckersley 15' (o.g.); Nardiello 63', 74'; O'Connor 77'		40' Lindfield	Stadium: New York Stadium; Attendance: 7,304

1 January 26	Accrington Stanley	1–0	Chesterfield	Accrington
	Boco 65'			Stadium: Crown Ground; Attendance: 1,586

5 January 27	Accrington Stanley	0–2	Dagenham & Redbridge	Accrington
			21' Saunders; 52' Howell	Stadium: Crown Ground; Attendance: 1,031

12 January 28	Aldershot Town	2–0	Accrington Stanley	Aldershot
	Brown 12'; López 81'			Stadium: Recreation Ground; Attendance: 1,912

19 January	Accrington Stanley	P – P	AFC Wimbledon	Accrington
				Stadium: Crown Ground

26 January 29	Plymouth Argyle	0–0	Accrington Stanley	Plymouth
				Stadium: Home Park; Attendance: 6,509

2 February 30	Port Vale	3–0	Accrington Stanley	Stoke-on-Trent
	Hughes 50', 66'; Purse 54'		(red card) 5' Barnett	Stadium: Vale Park; Attendance: 5,172

9 February 31	Accrington Stanley	1–1	Southend United	Accrington
	Gray 58'		(red card) 65' Cresswell; 82' Hurst	Stadium: Crown Ground; Attendance: 1,589

15 February 32	Exeter City	2–0	Accrington Stanley	Exeter
	Keohane 79', 82'			Stadium: St James Park; Attendance: 3,924

23 February 33	Accrington Stanley	2–2	Cheltenham Town	Accrington
	Beattie 40', 64'		32' (pen.), 70' Pack	Stadium: Crown Ground; Attendance: 1,216

26 February 34	Rochdale	0–3	Accrington Stanley	Rochdale
			76', 80' Molyneux; 86' Boco	Stadium: Spotland Stadium; Attendance: 1,780

2 March 35	Accrington Stanley	0–0	Torquay United	Accrington
				Stadium: Crown Ground; Attendance: 1,197

9 March 36	Northampton Town	2–0	Accrington Stanley	Northampton
	Chris Hackett 9'; O'Donovan 30'			Stadium: Sixfields Stadium; Attendance: 4,746

12 March 37	Accrington Stanley	0–3	Fleetwood Town	Accrington
			Parkin 25', 62', 70'	Stadium: Crown Ground; Attendance: 1,388

16 March 38	Accrington Stanley	3–2	Barnet	Accrington
	Molyneux 8', 25', 34' (pen.); Gray (yellow card) 90+5'		N'Toko (yellow card) 33'; Johnson 45'; Davids (yellow card) 59' (yellow-red card); Jenkins 63'	Stadium: Crown Ground; Attendance: 1,559

19 March 39	Accrington Stanley	4–0	AFC Wimbledon	Accrington
	Jeffers 5', 18'; Hatfield 32'; Molyneux 63'		Dickenson (yellow card) 85'	Stadium: Crown Ground; Attendance: 2,149

23 March 40	Gillingham	1–0	Accrington Stanley	Gillingham
	Fish 24'		Barnett (yellow card) 36'	Stadium: Priestfield Stadium; Attendance: 10,097

29 March 41	Wycombe Wanderers	0–1	Accrington Stanley	High Wycombe
	Morias (yellow card) 89'		Molyneux (yellow card) 21' (goal) 90+4'	Stadium: Adams Park; Attendance: 4,577

1 April 42	Accrington Stanley	3–3	Burton Albion	Accrington
	Hatfield 7'; Amond 61' (yellow card) 85'; Molyneux (yellow card) 80'; Aldred (yellow card) 84'; Beattie 90+3'		Paterson 36'; Diamond 66'; Maghoma 72'; Sharps (yellow card) 85'	Stadium: Crown Ground; Attendance: 1,619

6 April 43	York City	1–1	Accrington Stanley	York
	Reed 45+1'		Aldred (yellow card) 74'; Murphy 90+4'	Stadium: Bootham Crescent; Attendance: 4,446

12 April 44	Accrington Stanley	2–0	Morecambe	Accrington
	Murphy 28'; Amond 58'			Stadium: Crown Ground; Attendance: 2,473

20 April 45	Bristol Rovers	0–1	Accrington Stanley	Bristol
	Harrison (yellow card) 55'		Molyneux 2'	Stadium: Memorial Stadium; Attendance: 7,673

27 April 46	Accrington Stanley	0–3	Oxford United	Accrington
	Molyneux (red card) 89'		Constable (yellow card) 58' (goal) 64'; Smalley 67' (pen.); Rigg 90'	Stadium: Crown Ground; Attendance: 2,028

=== FA Cup ===
3 November Round 1	AFC Fylde	1–4	Accrington Stanley	Fylde
15:00	Farrell 90'		32', 45', 77', 86' Will Hatfield	Stadium: Kellamergh Park; Attendance: 1,213; Referee: Coote

1 December Round 2	Accrington Stanley	3–3	Oxford United	Accrington
15:00	Lindfield 25'; Beattie 80'; Molyneux 90'		12' Pittman; 86' Constable; 90' Raynes	Stadium: Crown Ground; Attendance: 1,195; Referee: Woolmer

18 December Round 2 Replay	Oxford United	2–0	Accrington Stanley	Oxford
19:45	Constable 66'; Leven 79'			Stadium: Kassam Stadium; Attendance: 2,566; Referee: Hooper

=== League Cup ===
11 August Round 1	Carlisle United	1–0	Accrington Stanley	Carlisle
15:00	Robson 39'	Report		Stadium: Brunton Park; Attendance: 2,924; Referee: N Miller

=== League Trophy ===
4 September Round 1	Accrington Stanley	0–2	Morecambe	Accrington
19:45		Report	31' Redshaw; 63' Ellison	Stadium: Crown Ground; Attendance: 1,049; Referee: Rushton
