= List of Chester F.C. players (1–24 appearances) =

Chester Football Club is an association football club based in Chester, England. They are currently members of the National League North, the sixth tier of English football, and play at the Deva Stadium.

The club was founded in 2010 following the liquidation of Chester City. In its inaugural season it won the Division One North of the Northern Premier League, then won the Northern League Premier Division in 2011–12 and the Conference North in 2012–13. Chester returned to the National League North following relegation in 2017–18.

The club's first team have competed in numerous competitions, and all players who have played 1-24 first-team matches, either as a member of the starting eleven or as a substitute, are listed below. Only players with appearances in the league, FA Cup and FA Trophy are listed. Each player's details include the duration of his Chester career, his typical playing position while with the club, and the number of matches played and goals scored in domestic league matches and in all senior competitive matches.

== Key ==
- The list is ordered first by number of appearances in total, then by number of league appearances, and then if necessary by date of debut.
- Statistics are correct up to and including the match played on 18 May 2025, the final match of Chester's 2024–25 season. Where a player left the club permanently after this date, his statistics are updated to his date of leaving.
- Players shown in bold are currently registered for the club.
- League appearances and goals comprise those in the Northern Premier League and the Football Conference/National League, excluding play-off games.
- Other appearances and goals comprise those in the FA Cup, FA Trophy, Cheshire Senior Cup, Northern Premier League League Cup and the league play-off games.
- Only players with appearances in the league, FA Cup and FA Trophy are listed.

== Players with 1 to 24 appearances ==
Statistics are correct up to the end of the 2024–25 season. Please do not update current players stats until the seasons ends or player leaves the club.

Name	Nat.	Pos	Date of birth	Joined		Left		League appearances				Other appearances				Total appearances				Notes	Refs
Name	Nat.	Pos	Date of birth	Date	From	Date	To	Starts	Subs	Total	Goals	Starts	Subs	Total	Goals	Starts	Subs	Total	Goals	Notes	Refs
John McCombe	(England)	DF	1985-05-07	2017-07-01	Macclesfield Town	2018-02-09	Harrogate Town	22	1	**23**	—	1	—	**1**	—	23	1	**24**	—		
Joe Heath	(England)	DF	1988-10-04	2013-07-08	Hereford United	2014-07-01	West Kirby	16	7	**23**	1	—	1	**1**	—	16	8	**24**	1		
Evan Horwood	(England)	DF	1986-03-10	2016-07-07	Northampton Town	2017-07-16	Bala Town	17	4	**21**	1	2	1	**3**	—	19	5	**24**	1		
Craig Lindfield	(England)	FW	1988-09-07	2013-05-29	Accrington Stanley	2014-07-01	United of Manchester	16	5	**21**	2	3	—	**3**	—	19	5	**24**	2		
Jerome Wright	(England)	MF	1989-10-29	2011-05-21	United of Manchester	2012-05-25	United of Manchester	16	3	**19**	2	2	3	**5**	—	18	6	**24**	2		
Alex Titchiner	(Wales)	FW	1991-06-13	2010-10-21	—	2010-11-21	—	11	8	**19**	—	3	2	**5**	—	14	10	**24**	—	on loan from Colwyn Bay	
Alex Titchiner	(Wales)	FW	1991-06-13	2013-07-04	—	2014-01-05	—	11	8	**19**	—	3	2	**5**	—	14	10	**24**	—	on loan from Fleetwood Town	
Richard Whiteside	(England)	GK	1985-03-10	2010-05-28	Burscough	2011-06-09	AFC Fylde	22	—	**22**	—	1	—	**1**	—	23	—	**23**	—		
Ibou Touray	(The Gambia)	DF	1994-12-24	2014-09-12	Everton	2015-07-01	Rhyl	7	12	**19**	—	2	2	**4**	1	9	14	**23**	1		
Elyh Harrison	(England)	MF	2006-02-19	2024-08-30	—	2025-01-07	—	18	—	**18**	—	5	—	**5**	—	23	—	**23**	—	on loan from Manchester United	
Offrande Zanzala	(Republic of the Congo)	FW	1997-12-13	2017-10-13	—	2017-11-13	—	9	7	**16**	3	3	4	**7**	1	12	11	**23**	4	on loan from Derby County	
Offrande Zanzala	(Republic of the Congo)	FW	1997-12-13	2025-07-01	Torquay United	2025-12-24	Marine	9	7	**16**	3	3	4	**7**	1	12	11	**23**	4		
Jon Moran	(England)	DF	1997-06-10	2018-06-24	Forest Green Rovers	2019-07-01	Bradford Park Avenue	15	4	**19**	1	3	—	**3**	—	18	4	**22**	1		
Levi Mackin	(Wales)	MF	1986-04-04	2012-01-04	Alfreton Town	2013-01-01	Bangor City	6	9	**15**	1	4	3	**7**	1	10	12	**22**	2		
Jordan McFarlane-Archer	(England)	FW	1993-11-11	2017-10-23	Stourbridge	2018-07-12	Bury	12	9	**21**	4	—	—	—	—	12	9	**21**	4		
George Thomson	(England)	FW	1994-05-01	2015-01-20	King's Lynn Town	2016-01-16	United of Manchester	7	13	**20**	2	1	—	**1**	1	8	13	**21**	3		
Ross Killock	(England)	DF	1994-07-12	2013-10-25	—	2014-07-01	—	17	2	**19**	2	2	—	**2**	—	19	2	**21**	2	on loan from Leeds United	
Ross Killock	(England)	DF	1994-07-12	2016-06-28	Leeds United	2017-07-01	retired	17	2	**19**	2	2	—	**2**	—	19	2	**21**	2		
Stuart Jones	(England)	DF	1986-08-28	2010-06-06	Cammell Laird	2011-07-01	Bala Town	14	2	**16**	4	3	2	**5**	—	17	4	**21**	4		
Deane Smalley	(England)	FW	1988-09-05	2018-08-03	Plymouth Argyle	2019-07-01	Hyde United	3	13	**16**	1	2	3	**5**	1	5	16	**21**	2		
David Fitzpatrick	(England)	DF	1990-02-28	2022-01-06	Altrincham	2022-07-01	Radcliffe	19	1	**20**	—	—	—	—	—	19	1	**20**	—		
Marcus Dackers	(Wales)	FW	2003-01-09	2022-01-14	—	2022-05-20	—	17	3	**20**	9	—	—	—	—	17	3	**20**	9	on loan from Salford City	
Christian Norton	(Wales)	FW	2001-05-21	2023-11-09	Cheltenham Town	2024-05-01	Bala Town	10	9	**19**	2	1	—	**1**	—	11	9	**20**	2		
Jamie Rainford	(England)	FW	1988-02-21	2011-05-13	Marine	2012-02-08	Halifax Town	5	12	**17**	2	3	—	**3**	1	8	12	**20**	3		
Dan Turner	(England)	FW	1999-12-06	2024-06-12	Brackley Town	2025-05-25	Hednesford Town	5	11	**16**	—	1	3	**4**	—	6	14	**20**	—		
Adam Judge	(England)	GK	1987-04-05	2011-01-12	Leigh Genesis	2012-02-27	Hyde	16	—	**16**	—	4	—	**4**	—	20	—	**20**	—		
Steven Beck	(England)	MF	1984-06-04	2010-07-01	Droylsden	2011-05-25	Vauxhall Motors	7	8	**15**	3	2	3	**5**	1	9	11	**20**	4		
Andy Bond	(England)	MF	1986-03-16	2014-01-24	Colchester United	2014-07-01	Stevenage	17	2	**19**	—	—	—	—	—	17	2	**19**	—		
Danny Higginbotham	(Gibraltar)	DF	1978-12-29	2013-08-30	Sheffield United	2014-01-01	Altrincham	15	2	**17**	1	2	—	**2**	—	17	2	**19**	1		
Daniel Cowan	(England)	DF	1992-02-18	2021-06-05	Curzon Ashton	2022-01-04	Buxton	14	2	**16**	2	3	—	**3**	—	17	2	**19**	2		
Nyal Bell	(England)	FW	1997-01-17	2016-01-29	—	2016-02-29	—	5	11	**16**	1	2	1	**3**	3	7	12	**19**	4	on loan from Rochdale	
Nyal Bell	(England)	FW	1997-01-17	2017-07-01	—	2018-01-01	—	5	11	**16**	1	2	1	**3**	3	7	12	**19**	4	on loan from Gateshead	
Matty Thomson	(Wales)	DF	2016-02-25	2016-07-01	youth team	2020-07-01	Bamber Bridge	10	3	**13**	—	3	3	**6**	—	13	6	**19**	—		
Bobby Jones	(Republic of Ireland)	GK	2001-11-20	2026-01-26	Boston United	2026-05-08	Darlington	18	—	**18**	—	—	—	—	—	18	—	**18**	—	on loan till 2026-02-27	
Jordan Gough	(England)	DF	1990-06-12	2017-10-23	AFC Telford United	2018-06-20	Boston United	15	1	**16**	—	2	—	**2**	—	17	1	**18**	—		
Ben Pollock	(England)	DF	1998-01-06	2024-05-11	Spennymoor Town	2025-02-18	Spennymoor Town	10	5	**15**	—	3	—	**3**	—	13	5	**18**	—		
James Horsfield	(England)	DF	1995-09-21	2021-09-17	Wrexham	2022-07-01	retired	12	2	**14**	1	2	2	**4**	—	14	4	**18**	1		
Rob Apter	(Scotland)	MF	2003-04-23	2022-01-03	—	2022-05-20	—	16	1	**17**	2	—	—	—	—	16	1	**17**	2	on loan from Blackpool	
Tom Crawford	(England)	MF	1999-05-30	2017-07-01	youth team	2018-05-29	Notts County	15	2	**17**	1	—	—	—	—	15	2	**17**	1		
Liam Roberts	(England)	GK	1994-11-21	2016-04-07	—	2017-07-01	—	15	—	**15**	—	2	—	**2**	—	17	—	**17**	—	on loan from Walsall	
Mitch Hancox	(England)	MF	1993-11-09	2024-06-22	Altrincham	2025-01-10	Spennymoor Town	6	9	**15**	—	—	2	**2**	—	6	**11**	17	—		
Bradley Bauress	(England)	MF	1996-04-28	2020-09-30	Southport	2021-07-01	Bala Town	12	2	**14**	1	2	1	**3**	—	14	3	**17**	1		
Jude Oyibo	(England)	MF	1998-08-23	2021-05-20	Curzon Ashton	2021-12-30	Spennymoor Town	2	11	**13**	1	1	3	**4**	—	3	14	**17**	1		
Lewis Coulton	(Scotland)	DF	2003-03-03	2022-07-27	—	2022-11-17	—	10	1	**11**	—	6	—	**6**	—	16	1	**17**	—	on loan from Preston North End	
Phil Croker	(England)	DF	2006-10-09	2026-01-16	—	2026-05-08	—	16	—	**16**	1	—	—	—	—	16	—	**16**	1	on loan from Crewe Alexandra	
Aaron Chapman	(England)	GK	1990-05-29	2014-02-07	—	2014-07-01	—	16	—	**16**	—	—	—	—	—	16	—	**16**	—	on loan from Chesterfield	
Brad Abbott	(England)	MF	1994-12-24	2015-01-16	—	2015-07-01	—	15	1	**16**	1	—	—	—	—	15	1	**16**	1	on loan from Barnsley	
Alex Brown	(England)	DF	1998-09-21	2022-12-10	Boston United	2023-05-26	Scarborough Athletic	13	2	**15**	—	1	—	**1**	—	14	2	**16**	—		
Taelor O'Kane	(England)	MF	2005-08-14	2025-02-14	—	2025-05-25	—	11	2	**13**	2	—	3	**3**	—	11	5	**16**	2	on loan from AFC Fylde	
John Pritchard	(England)	DF	1995-09-29	2018-06-24	Ashton United	2019-07-01	Ashton United	5	8	**13**	2	2	1	**3**	2	7	9	**16**	4		
Rob Hopley	(England)	FW	1985-01-02	2010-05-28	Colwyn Bay	2011-03-09	Colwyn Bay	9	3	**12**	3	4	—	**4**	1	13	3	**16**	4		
Michael Kelly	(Scotland)	DF	1997-11-03	2026-01-09	—	2026-05-08	—	15	—	**15**	—	—	—	—	—	15	—	**15**	—	on loan from Boston United	
Myles Anderson	(England)	DF	1990-01-09	2017-11-22	Torquay United	2018-07-01	Hartlepool United	13	1	**14**	—	1	—	**1**	—	14	1	**15**	—	on loan till 2018-02-08	
Sam Hornby	(England)	GK	1995-02-02	2017-12-07	—	2018-02-26	—	13	—	**13**	—	2	—	**2**	—	15	—	**15**	—	on loan from Port Vale	
James Jones	(Wales)	DF	1997-03-13	2025-05-31	Altrincham	2025-05-31	Connah's Quay Nomads	12	1	**13**	1	1	1	**2**	—	13	2	**15**	1		
Peter Winn	(England)	FW	1988-12-19	2014-06-25	Macclesfield Town	2015-07-01	Cleethorpes Town	6	6	**12**	1	1	2	**3**	—	7	8	**15**	1		
James Hardy	(England)	MF	1996-05-11	2021-06-15	Altrincham	2022-05-20	Buxton	8	2	**10**	2	5	—	**5**	1	13	2	**15**	3		
Oli McBurnie	(Scotland)	MF	1996-06-04	2015-01-23	—	2015-07-01	—	14	—	**14**	5	—	—	—	—	14	—	**14**	5	on loan from Bradford City	
Danny O'Brien	(England)	MF	1996-03-12	2016-02-12	—	2016-03-12	—	8	5	**13**	1	1	—	**1**	—	9	5	**14**	1	on loan from Wigan Athletic	
Danny O'Brien	(England)	MF	1996-03-12	2016-07-01	—	2017-07-01	—	8	5	**13**	1	1	—	**1**	—	9	5	**14**	1	on loan from Wigan Athletic	
George Green	(England)	FW	1996-01-02	2018-07-20	Nuneaton Town	2019-07-01	Boston United	4	7	**11**	—	2	1	**3**	1	6	8	**14**	1		
Stuart Graves	(Wales)	DF	1980-06-04	2010-07-01	?	2011-01-21	?	4	6	**10**	1	4	—	**4**	—	8	6	**14**	1		
Sean Clancy	(England)	DF	1987-09-16	2012-06-20	Fleetwood Town	2012-12-12	Kidderminster Harriers	7	2	**9**	1	4	1	**5**	—	11	3	**14**	1		
Tom Davies	(Wales)	DF	1992-04-18	2026-02-13	—	2026-05-08	—	13	—	**13**	3	—	—	—	—	13	—	**13**	3	on loan from Salisbury	
Shaun Hobson	(England)	DF	1998-06-29	2018-02-04	—	2018-04-19	—	13	—	**13**	—	—	—	—	—	13	—	**13**	—	on loan from AFC Bournemouth	
Ben Tollitt	(England)	MF	1994-11-30	2024-02-09	—	2024-07-01	—	9	4	**13**	4	—	—	—	—	9	4	**13**	4	on loan from Oldham Athletic	
Rowan Roache	(Republic of Ireland)	FW	2000-02-09	2022-02-01	Atherton Collieries	2022-05-20	Bamber Bridge	7	6	**13**	—	—	—	—	—	7	6	**13**	—		
Okera Simmonds	(England)	FW	1999-12-25	2022-01-15	Worcester Raiders	2022-05-20	Flint Town United	4	9	**13**	1	—	—	—	—	4	9	**13**	1		
Tony Thompson	(England)	GK	1994-11-04	2016-01-20	Morecambe	2016-07-01	AFC Fylde	12	—	**12**	—	1	—	**1**	—	13	—	**13**	—		
Lewis Earl	(England)	MF	2001-10-01	2022-06-25	Stockport County	2023-11-08	Marine	9	3	**12**	—	1	—	**1**	—	10	3	**13**	—		
Craig Curran	(England)	FW	1989-08-23	2012-11-09	—	2013-01-24	—	10	1	**11**	7	1	1	**2**	—	11	2	**13**	7	on loan from Rochdale	
Jack Redshaw	(England)	FW	1990-11-20	2021-09-27	—	2021-12-27	—	9	2	**11**	2	2	—	**2**	—	11	2	**13**	2	on loan from Ashton United	
Matt Glennon	(England)	GK	1978-10-08	2012-02-26	Stockport County	2012-07-01	Halifax Town	12	—	**12**	—	—	—	—	—	12	—	**12**	—		
Reece Hall-Johnson	(England)	DF	1995-05-09	2017-10-20	—	2017-11-20	—	11	—	**11**	1	1	—	**1**	—	12	—	**12**	1	on loan from Grimsby Town	
Dominic Smalley	(England)	MF	1989-10-05	2018-06-24	Ashton United	2019-07-01	Ashton United	10	1	**11**	—	1	—	**1**	—	11	1	**12**	—		
Cain Noble	(England)	MF	2001-01-03	2017-07-01	youth team	2020-07-01	?	5	4	**9**	1	1	2	**3**	1	6	6	**12**	2		
Luke Jordan	(England)	MF	1998-11-21	2018-09-08	Ramsbottom United	2019-07-01	Georgia State Panthers	—	9	**9**	—	2	1	**3**	—	2	10	**12**	—		
Luke Clark	(England)	DF	1994-05-24	2020-09-30	Curzon Ashton	2022-03-04	Marine	7	1	**8**	—	4	—	**4**	—	11	1	**12**	—		
Elton Ngwatala	(France)	MF	1993-05-23	2019-11-29	AFC Fylde	2020-07-01	AC Cambrai	5	3	**8**	—	2	2	**4**	—	7	5	**12**	—		
Andy Firth	(England)	GK	1996-09-26	2017-01-27	—	2018-07-01	—	11	—	**11**	—	—	—	—	—	11	—	**11**	—	on loan from Liverpool	
Dominic Vose	(England)	MF	1993-11-23	2018-02-16	Bromley	2021-07-01	Dulwich Hamlet	10	1	**11**	1	—	—	—	—	10	1	**11**	1		
Matt Sargent	(Wales)	FW	2001-01-16	2022-03-18	—	2022-05-20	—	8	3	**11**	1	—	—	—	—	8	3	**11**	1	on loan from Salford City	
Rhys Hughes	(Wales)	MF	2001-09-21	2023-01-19	—	2023-03-17	—	9	1	**10**	2	—	—	—	—	9	1	**10**	2	on loan from Tranmere Rovers	
Sean McAllister	(England)	MF	1987-08-15	2019-01-11	Grimsby Town	2019-07-01	Newtown	8	2	**10**	—	—	—	—	—	8	2	**10**	—		
Chris Iwelumo	(Scotland)	FW	1978-08-01	2014-06-30	St Johnstone	2014-10-29	retired	4	6	**10**	1	—	—	—	—	4	6	**10**	1		
Festus Arthur	(Germany)	DF	2000-02-27	2025-09-23	Southport	2026-02-03	King's Lynn Town	9	—	**9**	—	1	—	**1**	—	10	—	**10**	—		
Tom Sparrow	(Wales)	FW	2002-12-06	2023-09-05	—	2024-01-03	—	8	—	**8**	—	2	—	**2**	—	10	—	**10**	—	on loan from Stoke City	
Nathan Brown	(Wales)	FW	1998-10-11	2016-07-01	youth team	2019-03-12	Marine	1	7	**8**	1	2	—	**2**	3	3	7	**10**	4		
Mark Connolly	(England)	MF	1984-07-02	2010-05-29	Rhyl	2011-07-01	Bala Town	3	4	**7**	1	2	1	**3**	1	5	5	**10**	2		
Ben McKenna	(Northern Ireland)	MF	1993-01-16	2019-01-18	Bradford Park Avenue	2019-07-01	Spennymoor Town	6	3	**9**	1	—	—	—	—	6	3	**9**	1		
Conor Mitchell	(Northern Ireland)	GK	1996-05-09	2017-08-08	—	2017-12-07	—	8	—	**8**	—	1	—	**1**	—	9	—	**9**	—	on loan from Burnley	
George Miller	(England)	MF	1991-11-25	2013-11-28	—	2013-12-28	—	8	—	**8**	—	1	—	**1**	—	9	—	**9**	—	on loan from Accrington Stanley	
Adam Dawson	(England)	MF	1992-10-05	2018-11-01	AFC Telford United	2019-01-04	Macclesfield Town	4	3	**7**	—	2	—	**2**	—	6	3	**9**	—		
Lee Pugh	(England)	DF	1992-11-30	2013-05-22	Clitheroe	2014-07-01	Ramsbottom United	8	—	**8**	—	—	—	—	—	8	—	**8**	—		
Jack Lambert	(England)	MF	1999-03-13	2025-02-14	Kidderminster Harriers	2025-05-25	King's Lynn Town	7	1	**8**	—	—	—	—	—	7	1	**8**	—		
Jadan Hall	(England)	FW	1993-10-30	2014-08-28	—	2014-09-28	—	7	1	**8**	—	—	—	—	—	7	1	**8**	—	on loan from Burnley	
Andy Burgess	(England)	MF	1981-08-10	2010-07-21	Mansfield Town	2010-10-27	Fleetwood Town	5	2	**7**	—	1	—	**1**	—	6	2	**8**	—		
Nick Rogan	(England)	FW	1983-10-15	2010-08-17	—	2010-09-17	—	2	5	**7**	1	1	—	**1**	—	3	5	**8**	1	on loan from Fleetwood Town	
Frankie Maguire	(England)	MF	2003-07-29	2023-08-18	—	2024-01-02	—	2	5	**7**	—	1	—	**1**	—	3	5	**8**	—	on loan from Sheffield United	
Danny Hattersley	(England)	FW	1992-04-08	2015-11-25	—	2016-01-24	—	6	—	**6**	—	2	—	**2**	—	8	—	**8**	—	on loan from Halifax Town	
Chris Sanna	(Wales)	GK	1987-02-27	2010-11-04	Colwyn Bay	2011-01-09	Colwyn Bay	6	—	**6**	—	2	—	**2**	—	8	—	**8**	—		
Mark Peers	(England)	FW	1984-05-14	2010-07-01	Halifax Town	2010-09-22	Northwich Victoria	2	4	**6**	—	1	1	**2**	—	3	5	**8**	—		
Will Goodwin	(England)	FW	2002-05-07	2019-07-01	youth team	2021-02-02	Stoke City	3	—	**3**	—	1	4	**5**	1	4	4	**8**	1		
Martin Fearon	(England)	GK	1988-10-30	2012-06-15	Lancaster City	2014-07-01	Skelmersdale United	2	—	**2**	—	6	—	**6**	—	8	—	**8**	—		
Matty Taylor	(England)	FW	1990-03-30	2014-01-31	—	2014-03-10	—	7	—	**7**	6	—	—	—	—	7	—	**7**	6	on loan from Forest Green Rovers	
Kieran Burton	(England)	DF	2003-10-15	2024-03-06	—	2024-07-01	—	7	—	**7**	—	—	—	—	—	7	—	**7**	—	on loan from Hartlepool United	
Owen Windsor	(England)	FW	2001-09-17	2023-11-24	Chippenham Town	2024-02-14	Marine	4	3	**7**	1	—	—	—	—	4	3	**7**	1		
Emmanuel Dieseruvwe	(England)	FW	1995-02-20	2018-10-25	—	2018-11-25	—	4	3	**7**	—	—	—	—	—	4	3	**7**	—	on loan from Salford City	
Danny Carlton	(England)	FW	1983-12-22	2014-03-18	—	2014-04-27	—	3	4	**7**	3	—	—	—	—	3	4	**7**	3	on loan from Hyde	
Aidan Chippendale	(England)	MF	1992-05-24	2013-08-23	—	2013-09-23	—	3	4	**7**	1	—	—	—	—	3	4	**7**	1	on loan from Bury	
Will Hugill	(England)	MF	2006-06-27	2024-10-30	—	2024-12-03	—	6	—	**6**	—	1	—	**1**	—	7	—	**7**	—	on loan from Burnley	
Charlie Jolley	(England)	FW	2001-01-13	2021-10-29	—	2021-12-08	—	5	1	**6**	1	1	—	**1**	1	6	1	**7**	2	on loan from Tranmere Rovers	
James McCarthy	(England)	FW	1985-12-02	2010-11-16	Kidsgrove Athletic	2011-03-04	Colwyn Bay	4	2	**6**	1	1	—	**1**	1	5	2	**7**	2		
Liam Davies	(England)	FW	1996-07-02	2017-03-23	Tranmere Rovers	2018-03-08	Southport	4	2	**6**	1	1	—	**1**	—	5	2	**7**	1		
Wayne Riley	(England)	MF	1989-09-26	2014-06-04	Hednesford Town	2015-01-13	Airbus UK Broughton	—	6	**6**	1	1	—	**1**	—	1	6	**7**	1		
Cameron Mason	(England)	GK	1996-01-21	2024-06-10	Curzon Ashton	2025-01-13	Bradford Park Avenue	5	—	**5**	—	2	—	**2**	—	7	—	**7**	—		
James Roberts	(England)	FW	1996-06-21	2015-09-29	—	2015-10-29	—	6	—	**6**	1	—	—	—	—	6	—	**6**	1	on loan from Oxford United	
Chris Lester	(Northern Ireland)	MF	1994-10-27	2013-11-01	—	2013-12-01	—	4	1	**5**	—	1	—	**1**	—	5	1	**6**	—	on loan from Bolton Wanderers	
Zack Clarke	(England)	FW	2003-01-25	2021-06-23	Stockport County	2024-02-01	Caernarfon Town	1	4	**5**	—	—	1	**1**	—	1	5	**6**	—		
Connor Evans	(Wales)	FW	2003-09-27	2023-08-25	—	2023-11-20	—	2	2	**4**	—	1	1	**2**	—	3	3	**6**	—	on loan from Crewe Alexandra	
Luke Holden	(England)	MF	1988-11-24	2011-11-04	Droylsden	2011-12-04	The New Saints	2	1	**3**	2	2	1	**3**	—	4	2	**6**	2		
Sean Miller	(England)	FW	1995-05-09	2011-07-01	youth team	2014-07-01	Connah's Quay Nomads	1	1	**2**	—	—	4	**4**	—	1	5	**6**	—		
Sean Miller	(England)	FW	1995-05-09	2018-08-31	Altrincham	2019-01-01	Curzon Ashton	1	1	**2**	—	—	4	**4**	—	1	5	**6**	—		
Alex Whitmore	(England)	DF	1995-09-07	2015-11-24	—	2015-12-31	—	5	—	**5**	—	—	—	—	—	5	—	**5**	—	on loan from Burnley	
Martin Gritton	(Scotland)	FW	1978-06-01	2011-02-18	Chesterfield	2011-03-22	Yeovil Town	4	1	**5**	1	—	—	—	—	4	1	**5**	1		
Brendon Daniels	(England)	FW	1993-09-24	2013-02-22	—	2013-03-22	—	2	3	**5**	1	—	—	—	—	2	3	**5**	1	on loan from Crewe Alexandra	
Brendon Daniels	(England)	FW	1993-09-24	2014-02-25	Crewe Alexandra	2014-07-01	Tamworth	2	3	**5**	1	—	—	—	—	2	3	**5**	1		
Scott Barlow	(England)	FW	?	2011-03-20	Trafford	2011-05-25	Mossley	—	5	**5**	—	—	—	—	—	—	5	**5**	—		
Mark Reed	(England)	FW	1981-06-27	2011-07-01	Buxton	2011-09-16	Buxton	—	5	**5**	—	—	—	—	—	—	5	**5**	—		
Jack Shorrock	(England)	DF	2007-04-28	2025-10-31	—	2026-01-10	—	3	1	**4**	—	1	—	**1**	—	4	1	**5**	—	on loan from Port Vale	
Luke Denson	(England)	DF	1991-02-26	2012-10-01	Colwyn Bay	2013-01-09	AFC Fylde	4	—	**4**	—	1	—	**1**	—	5	—	**5**	—		
Rhys Oates	(England)	FW	1994-12-04	2014-11-11	—	2014-12-20	—	3	1	**4**	2	1	—	**1**	—	4	1	**5**	2	on loan from Barnsley	
Tom McCready	(England)	MF	1991-06-07	2010-10-08	Altrincham	2011-07-01	?	2	2	**4**	—	—	1	**1**	—	2	3	**5**	—		
James Ellison	(England)	FW	1991-10-25	2011-11-10	—	2011-12-10	—	2	1	**3**	—	1	1	**2**	—	3	2	**5**	—	on loan from Burton Albion	
Jaiden White	(England)	FW	2002-04-02	2026-02-06	—	2026-05-08	—	—	4	**4**	—	—	—	—	—	—	4	**4**	—	on loan from Sutton United	
Andrew Wogan	(Republic of Ireland)	GK	2005-12-01	2025-08-16	—	2025-08-29	—	4	—	**4**	—	—	—	—	—	4	—	**4**	—	on loan from Stockport County	
Jid Okeke	(Germany)	MF	2004-11-11	2024-01-19	—	2024-02-29	—	4	—	**4**	—	—	—	—	—	4	—	**4**	—	on loan from Stockport County	
Freddy Hall	(Bermuda)	GK	1985-03-03	2014-08-07	Burton Albion	2014-08-27	Oxford City	4	—	**4**	—	—	—	—	—	4	—	**4**	—		
Danny Taylor	(England)	DF	1991-09-01	2014-06-04	Colwyn Bay	2014-11-01	Colwyn Bay	4	—	**4**	—	—	—	—	—	4	—	**4**	—		
Stefan Cox	(England)	MF	1981-09-17	2012-01-26	—	2012-02-26	—	3	1	**4**	—	—	—	—	—	3	1	**4**	—	on loan from Fleetwood Town	
Conor Wilkinson	(Republic of Ireland)	FW	1995-01-23	2013-11-01	—	2013-12-01	—	3	1	**4**	1	—	—	—	—	3	1	**4**	1	on loan from Bolton Wanderers	
Andy Griffin	(England)	DF	1979-03-17	2014-03-27	Doncaster Rovers	2014-07-01	retired	3	1	**4**	—	—	—	—	—	3	1	**4**	—		
Noah Wadsworth	(England)	DF	2005-01-26	2024-12-23	—	2025-01-20	—	2	2	**4**	—	—	—	—	—	2	2	**4**	—	on loan from Hull City	
Calum Dyson	(England)	FW	1996-09-19	2015-11-09	—	2015-12-04	—	2	2	**4**	—	—	—	—	—	2	2	**4**	—	on loan from Everton	
Daniel Udoh	(Nigeria)	FW	1996-08-30	2017-12-10	—	2018-01-10	—	2	1	**3**	—	—	1	**1**	—	2	2	**4**	—	on loan from Crewe Alexandra	
Lee Trundle	(England)	FW	1976-10-10	2013-02-17	Preston North End	2013-03-28	Marine	1	2	**3**	—	1	—	**1**	1	2	2	**4**	1		
Roger Sharrock	(England)		1986-05-08	2010-06-17	Lancaster City	2011-03-09	?	1	2	**3**	—	1	—	**1**	—	2	2	**4**	—		
Danny Meadowcroft	(England)	DF	1985-05-22	2010-05-28	Northwich Victoria	2011-01-07	Colwyn Bay	2	—	**2**	—	2	—	**2**	—	4	—	**4**	—		
Joe Ormrod	(England)	MF	1994-11-18	2011-07-01	youth team	2013-07-01	?	—	2	**2**	—	1	1	**2**	—	1	3	**4**	—		
Will Marsh	(England)	FW	1996-10-01	2016-11-10	Liverpool	2017-07-01	AFC Telford United	—	2	**2**	—	2	—	**2**	—	2	2	**4**	—		
Zak Goodson	(England)	FW	2000-04-08	2023-06-01	Altrincham	2023-09-12	Ilkeston Town	3	—	**3**	1	—	—	—	—	3	—	**3**	1		
Jordan Laidler	(England)	FW	1995-07-01	2013-08-23	—	2013-09-23	—	3	—	**3**	—	—	—	—	—	3	—	**3**	—	on loan from Sunderland	
Nathan Sheron	(England)	DF	1997-10-04	2017-09-04	—	2017-10-04	—	3	—	**3**	—	—	—	—	—	3	—	**3**	—	on loan from Fleetwood Town	
Kelly N'Mai	(Netherlands)	FW	2004-05-01	2023-03-01	—	2023-07-01	—	3	—	**3**	1	—	—	—	—	3	—	**3**	1	on loan from Salford City	
**Scott Burgess**	(England)	MF	1996-06-27	2025-01-24	Truro City			1	2	**3**	—	—	—	—	—	1	2	**3**	—		
Scott Metcalfe	(England)	MF	1988-03-28	2010-12-28	—	2011-01-28	—	1	2	**3**	—	—	—	—	—	1	2	**3**	—	on loan from Halifax Town	
Jack Mackreth	(Wales)	FW	1992-04-13	2011-03-29	—	2011-07-01	—	1	2	**3**	—	—	—	—	—	1	2	**3**	—	on loan from Tranmere Rovers	
Luke Ashworth	(England)	DF	1989-12-04	2014-03-27	—	2014-04-27	—	1	2	**3**	—	—	—	—	—	1	2	**3**	—	on loan from Hyde	
Dale Tonge	(England)	DF	1985-05-07	2015-07-01	Torquay United	2015-09-29	Stockport County	1	2	**3**	—	—	—	—	—	1	2	**3**	—		
Jamal Crawford	(Wales)	MF	1997-11-26	2019-04-01	United of Manchester	2019-07-01	Curzon Ashton	1	2	**3**	—	—	—	—	—	1	2	**3**	—		
Connor Taylor	(England)	DF	2001-10-25	2020-12-18	—	2021-01-31	—	1	2	**3**	—	—	—	—	—	1	2	**3**	—	on loan from Stoke City	
Daniel Griffiths	(Wales)	MF	2001-01-16	2022-03-18	—	2022-05-20	—	—	3	**3**	—	—	—	—	—	—	3	**3**	—	on loan from Chippenham Town	
Ryan Rainey	(Republic of Ireland)	MF	1996-10-11	2017-10-23	—	2017-11-23	—	2	—	**2**	—	1	—	**1**	—	3	—	**3**	—	on loan from Wolverhampton Wanderers	
Harry McHugh	(England)	MF	2002-10-14	2022-09-08	—	2022-10-06	—	2	—	**2**	—	1	—	**1**	—	3	—	**3**	—	on loan from Wigan Athletic	
Steven Hewitt	(England)	MF	1993-12-05	2015-12-31	Burnley	2016-07-01	Southport	1	1	**2**	—	1	—	**1**	—	2	1	**3**	—		
Callum Morris	(England)	MF	1992-09-01	2014-09-05	Tranmere Rovers	2015-07-01	Bangor City	—	2	**2**	—	1	—	**1**	—	1	2	**3**	—		
Jason Gilchrist	(England)	FW	1994-12-17	2016-01-08	—	2016-02-08	—	—	2	**2**	—	—	1	**1**	1	—	3	**3**	1	on loan from Burnley	
Richie Foulkes	(Wales)	MF	1985-12-21	2010-05-28	Cammell Laird	2011-07-01	?	—	1	**1**	—	2	—	**2**	—	2	1	**3**	—		
Alex Downes	(England)	DF	1999-11-02	2016-07-01	youth team	2018-07-01	Colwyn Bay	—	1	**1**	—	1	1	**2**	—	1	2	**3**	—		
Rhain Hellawell	(Wales)	MF	?	2017-07-01	youth team	2019-07-01	?	—	1	**1**	—	1	1	**2**	—	1	2	**3**	—		
Ricky Bridge	(England)	DF	?	2014-02-28	Newcastle Town	2014-07-01	?	2	—	**2**	—	—	—	—	—	2	—	**2**	—		
Josh O'Hanlon	(Republic of Ireland)	FW	1995-09-25	2015-09-01	—	2015-09-16	—	2	—	**2**	—	—	—	—	—	2	—	**2**	—	on loan from AFC Bournemouth	
Shepherd Murombedzi	(Zimbabwe)	MF	1994-11-15	2018-01-21	Solihull Moors	2021-07-01	Brackley Town	2	—	**2**	—	—	—	—	—	2	—	**2**	—		
Shaun Tuton	(England)	FW	1991-12-03	2018-08-03	Barnsley	2019-07-01	Spennymoor Town	2	—	**2**	—	—	—	—	—	2	—	**2**	—		
Jason St Juste	(Saint Kitts and Nevis)	MF	1985-09-21	2011-02-09	—	2011-03-31	—	1	1	**2**	—	—	—	—	—	1	1	**2**	—	on loan from Garforth Town	
Josh O'Keefe	(Republic of Ireland)	MF	1988-12-22	2014-11-11	—	2015-01-11	—	1	1	**2**	—	—	—	—	—	1	1	**2**	—	on loan from Kidderminster Harriers	
Matty Mainwaring	(England)	MF	1990-03-28	2014-02-03	Hyde	2014-07-01	Stalybridge Celtic	—	2	**2**	—	—	—	—	—	—	2	**2**	—		
Josh Green	(England)	MF	1991-01-11	2015-01-04	—	2015-07-01	—	—	2	**2**	—	—	—	—	—	—	2	**2**	—	on loan from Fleetwood Town	
Jorome Slew	(England)	FW	1997-11-29	2017-11-22	Goole	2018-07-01	North Ferriby United	—	2	**2**	—	—	—	—	—	—	2	**2**	—		
Karl Cunningham	(England)	MF	1993-11-04	2018-03-09	Akropolis	2018-07-01	Hayes & Yeading	—	2	**2**	—	—	—	—	—	—	2	**2**	—		
John Disney	(Republic of Ireland)	DF	1992-05-15	2014-06-25	Hednesford Town	2015-01-13	AFC Telford United	1	—	**1**	—	1	—	**1**	—	2	—	**2**	—		
Gareth Evans	(Wales)	MF	1987-01-10	2010-10-04	—	2010-12-01	—	—	1	**1**	—	1	—	**1**	—	1	1	**2**	—	on loan from Real Maryland Monarchs	
Luke Woodland	(Philippines)	DF	1995-07-21	2015-10-30	Bolton Wanderers	2016-07-01	Bradford Park Avenue	—	1	**1**	—	1	—	**1**	—	1	1	**2**	—		
Ben Greenop	(England)	FW	1997-08-01	2014-07-01	youth team	2015-01-04	Prescot Cables	—	—	—	—	1	1	**2**	—	1	1	**2**	—		
Jake Burton	(England)	FW	2001-11-15	2023-07-27	Tranmere Rovers	2024-05-01	Warrington Rylands	—	2	**2**	—	—	—	—	—	—	2	**2**	—		
Michael Clarke	(England)	DF	1989-08-13	2010-12-14	Woodley Sports	2011-01-21	Woodley Sports	1	—	**1**	—	—	—	—	—	1	—	**1**	—		
David Okagbue	(Republic of Ireland)	DF	2003-10-05	2022-02-01	—	2022-03-01	—	1	—	**1**	—	—	—	—	—	1	—	**1**	—	on loan from Stoke City	
Jack Duggan	(England)	DF	1993-01-03	2011-12-02	—	2012-01-02	—	—	1	**1**	—	—	—	—	—	—	1	**1**	—	on loan from Fleetwood Town	
Shaquille McDonald	(England)	FW	1995-07-19	2013-09-14	—	2013-12-14	—	—	1	**1**	—	—	—	—	—	—	1	**1**	—	on loan from Peterborough United	
James Caton	(England)	FW	1994-01-04	2014-03-27	—	2014-04-27	—	—	1	**1**	1	—	—	—	—	—	1	**1**	1	on loan from Blackpool	
Jamie McDonagh	(Northern Ireland)	MF	1996-05-08	2015-10-29	—	2015-11-29	—	—	1	**1**	—	—	—	—	—	—	1	**1**	—	on loan from Sheffield United	
Josh Lennie	(England)	GK	1986-03-26	2011-03-30	Skelmersdale United	2011-07-01	Bedfont Town	1	—	**1**	—	—	—	—	—	1	—	**1**	—		
Jonathan Viscosi	(Canada)	GK	1991-03-18	2015-01-16	Brackley Town	2015-07-01	Southport	—	1	**1**	—	—	—	—	—	—	1	**1**	—		
Adam Bott	(England)	MF	2005-10-13	2023-07-01	youth team	2025-05-25		—	1	**1**	—	—	—	—	—	—	1	**1**	—		
**Alex Brown**	(England)	GK	2006-07-14	2024-07-01	youth team			1	—	**1**	—	—	—	—	—	1	—	**1**	—		
**Henry Briscoe**	(England)	MF	2006-12-05	2024-07-01	youth team			1	—	**1**	—	—	—	—	—	1	—	**1**	—		
Zak Emmerson	(England)	DF	2004-08-12	2026-01-09	—	2026-05-08	—	1	—	**1**	—	—	—	—	—	1	—	**1**	—	on loan from FC Halifax Town	
Lewys Benjamin	(Wales)	GK	2006-09-13	2025-07-19	—	2026-01-08	—	1	—	**1**	—	—	—	—	—	1	—	**1**	—	on loan from Wolverhampton Wanderers	
