= 2015–16 Morecambe F.C. season =

Morecambe
2015–16 season
- Chairman: Peter McGuigan
- Manager: Jim Bentley
- Stadium: Globe Arena
- League Two: 21st
- FA Cup: First Round
- League Cup: First Round
- League Trophy: Area Semi-finals
- Top goalscorer: League: Shaun Miller (15); All: Shaun Miller (16)
- Highest home attendance: 3,070 v Carlisle United; 27 February 2016
- Lowest home attendance: 1,027 v Dagenham & Redbridge; 1 December 2015
- Average home league attendance: 1,572
- Biggest win: Morecambe 4–1 Notts County; 29 August 2015; Wimbledon 2–5 Morecambe; 17 October 2015
- Biggest defeat: Cambridge United 7–0 Morecambe; 19 April 2016
Home colours	Away colours	Third colours
- All statistics correct as of match played 7 May 2016.

The 2015–16 season was Morecambe's ninth consecutive season in League Two, the fourth tier of English football.

They began the season on 8 August 2015, with the opening match of their League Two campaign. They also competed in three cup competitions, the FA Cup, the League Cup and the League Trophy.

They were eliminated in the first round of both the FA Cup and the League Cup, but performed better in the League Trophy. Reaching the area semi-finals was their best performance for eight years. They knocked out three League One sides before losing 2–0 away to Fleetwood Town on 8 December 2015.

== Competitions ==
=== Pre-season and friendlies ===
On 19 May 2015, Morecambe announced the dates for their home pre-season friendlies which included Bolton Wanderers and Bury. On 27 May 2015, Morecambe announced they will visit Nantwich Town. On 9 June 2015, Morecambe confirmed they will visit Kendal Town. On 19 June 2015, Morecambe announced two further pre-season friendlies. On 28 June 2015, Morecambe announced a Liverpool XI side will visit on 1 August 2015.

14 July 2015 Friendly	Kendal Town	0–5	Morecambe	Kendal
19:30 BST		Report	Wildig 22'; Molyneux 50' (pen.); Kenyon 69'; Ellison 79'; Barkhuizen 90' (pen.)	Stadium: The Northgate Vehicle Hire Stadium

17 July 2015 Friendly	Morecambe	2–1	Bolton Wanderers	Morecambe
19:30 BST	Wildig 40'; Mullin 48'	Report	Dobbie 32'	Stadium: Globe Arena

21 July 2015 Friendly	Nantwich Town	0–6	Morecambe	Nantwich
19:30 BST		Report	Ellison 6'; Mullin 10', 21' (pen.), 39', 45'; Wildig 83'	Stadium: The Weaver Stadium

24 July 2015 Friendly	Morecambe	1–1	Bury	Morecambe
19:30 BST	Murphy 40'	Report	Edwards 4' (o.g.)	Stadium: Globe Arena

27 July 2015 Friendly	Carnforth Rangers	1–2	Morecambe	Carnforth
19:00 BST	Murphy 30'	Report	Kelleher 45' (pen.), 55'	Stadium: Quarry Park

1 August 2015 Friendly	Morecambe	2–2	Liverpool XI	Morecambe
15:00 BST	Mullin 49', 50' (pen.)	Report	Gomez 59'; Sinclair 73'	Stadium: Globe Arena; Attendance: 1,794 (398 away); Referee: Graham Salisbury

5 August 2015 Friendly	AFC Liverpool	2–5	Morecambe	Crosby
19:30 BST	Belger 20'; Barry 39'	Report	Ryan 41', 69'; Doyle 71'; Miller 74'; Kelleher 85'	Stadium: Arriva Stadium

=== League Two ===
==== League table ====
Pos	Team	Pld	W	D	L	GF	GA	GD	Pts	Promotion, qualification or relegation
19	Yeovil Town	46	11	15	20	43	59	−16	48	
20	Crawley Town	46	13	8	25	45	78	−33	47	
21	Morecambe	46	12	10	24	69	91	−22	46	
22	Newport County	46	10	13	23	43	64	−21	43	
23	Dagenham & Redbridge (R)	46	8	10	28	46	81	−35	34	Relegation to the National League

Updated to match(es) played on 7 May 2016. Source: BBC Sport
Rules for classification: 1) Points; 2) Goal difference; 3) Number of goals scored
(R) Relegated

=== Results by matchday ===
Round	1	2	3	4	5	6	7	8	9	10	11	12	13	14	15	16	17	18	19	20	21	22	23	24	25	26	27	28	29	30	31	32	33	34	35	36	37	38	39	40	41	42	43	44	45	46
Ground	A	H	H	A	H	A	A	H	A	H	H	A	A	H	H	A	A	H	A	H	A	A	A	H	H	A	H	H	H	A	H	A	H	A	A	H	A	H	H	A	H	A	A	H	A	H
Result	L	W	L	D	W	W	W	L	D	L	L	W	W	W	L	L	D	L	L	W	L	D	W	D	W	L	L	L	D	L	L	L	L	L	D	W	L	L	W	L	L	D	L	L	D	D
Position	20	12	16	15	10	5	5	7	7	12	14	11	10	7	8	11	15	16	17	13	17	17	13	14	13	14	14	15	14	16	16	17	18	18	18	17	18	18	18	18	19	19	20	21	21	21

Source: Statto.com
A = Away; H = Home; W = Win; D = Draw; L = Loss

==== Matches ====
On 17 June 2015, the fixtures for the forthcoming season were announced.

8 August 2015 1	Hartlepool United	2–0	Morecambe	Hartlepool
15:00 BST	Paynter 25'; Harrison (yellow card) 30'; Fenwick (yellow card) 48'; Bingham 65'; Magnay (yellow card) 84'; Duckworth (yellow card) 89'	Report	Mullin (yellow card) 84'; Edwards (yellow card) 90+4'	Stadium: Victoria Park; Attendance: 4,289; Referee: Darren England

15 August 2015 2	Morecambe	1–0	Accrington Stanley	Morecambe
15:00 BST	Wildig 13'; Kenyon (yellow card) 86'	Report	Winnard (yellow card) 51'	Stadium: Globe Arena; Attendance: 1,865; Referee: Stuart Attwell

18 August 2015 3	Morecambe	0–1	Wycombe Wanderers	Morecambe
19:45 BST		Report	Thompson (yellow card) 58'; Bean (yellow card) 64'; Pierre 74'; McGinn (yellow card) 83'	Stadium: Globe Arena; Attendance: 1,395; Referee: Mark Haywood

22 August 2015 4	Portsmouth	3–3	Morecambe	Portsmouth
15:00 BST	Burgess (yellow card) 24'; Stevens (yellow card) 31' (yellow-red card) 73'; Roberts 42', 65'; Stockley 90+5'	Report	Barkhuizen 11'; Goodall 25'; Roche (yellow card) 36'; Fleming 38'; Beeley (yellow card) 45'; Dugdale (yellow card) 90+2'	Stadium: Fratton Park; Attendance: 16,052; Referee: Roger East

29 August 2015 5	Morecambe	4–1	Notts County	Morecambe
15:00 BST	Goodall 20'; Mullin 65'; Devitt (yellow card) 75' (goal) 90'; Fleming (yellow card) 86'; Kenyon 88'	Report	Amevor (yellow card) 17'; Snijders 41'; Campbell (yellow card) 45+1'; McLeod (yellow card) 86'	Stadium: Globe Arena; Attendance: 1,621; Referee: Ross Joyce

5 September 2015 6	Yeovil Town	2–4	Morecambe	Yeovil
15:00 BST	Cornick 2'; Jeffers (red card) 27'; Sowunmi 30'	Report	Devitt (yellow card) 45+2'; McGowan (yellow card) 45+3'; Edwards (yellow card) 58'; Wildig 64'; Fleming 71'; Molyneux 84'; Ellison 90+2'	Stadium: Huish Park; Attendance: 3,024; Referee: Nick Kinseley

12 September 2015 7	Newport County	1–2	Morecambe	Newport
15:00 BST	Barrow (yellow card) 33' (goal) 67'; Hayden (yellow card) 90+5'	Report	Goodall 34'; Dugdale (yellow card) 48'; Mullin 90+4' (pen.)	Stadium: Rodney Parade; Attendance: 2,068; Referee: Robert Lewis

19 September 2015 8	Morecambe	2–4	Northampton Town	Morecambe
15:00 BST	Barkhuizen 67'; Byrom 86' (o.g.)	Report	D'Ath 31'; Hoskins 34'; Furlong (yellow card) 37'; Byrom 48'; Calvert-Lewin 69'	Stadium: Globe Arena; Attendance: 1,778; Referee: Eddie Ilderton

26 September 2015 9	Oxford United	0–0	Morecambe	Oxford
15:00 BST	Taylor (yellow card) 90'	Report	Beeley (yellow card) 66'; Dugdale (yellow card) 77'; McGowan (yellow card) 90+5'	Stadium: Kassam Stadium; Attendance: 5,273; Referee: Tim Robinson

29 September 2015 10	Morecambe	1–3	Luton Town	Morecambe
19:45 BST	Barkhuizen 25'	Report	Wilkinson 13'; McGeehan 27'; McNulty (yellow card) 68'; Smith 88'	Stadium: Globe Arena; Attendance: 1,388; Referee: Chris Sarginson

3 October 2015 11	Morecambe	3–4	Bristol Rovers	Morecambe
15:00 BST	Miller 43'; Barkhuizen 60'; Mullin 87' (pen.); Fleming (yellow card) 90+6'	Report	Mansell 28'; Bodin 47'; Taylor 58'; Harrison 80' (pen.); Nicholls (yellow card) 90+2'	Stadium: Globe Arena; Attendance: 1,712; Referee: Andy Madley

10 October 2015 12	Carlisle United	2–3	Morecambe	Carlisle
15:00 BST	Grainger 23'; Joyce (yellow card) 45+1'; Asamoah (yellow card) 58' (goal) 90+2'	Report	Miller 35', 74'; Barkhuizen 63'	Stadium: Brunton Park; Attendance: 5,303; Referee: Peter Bankes

17 October 2015 13	Wimbledon	2–5	Morecambe	London
14:00 BST	Barcham 3'; Taylor (yellow card) 44'; Akinfenwa (yellow card) 45+8' (goal) 49'; Reeves (yellow card) 76'	Report	Miller 8' (pen.), 13'; Kenyon (yellow card) 15'; Goodall (yellow card) 17' (goal) 45+9'; Devitt (yellow card) 21'; Ellison (yellow card) 55'; Barkhuizen 80'; Mullin 90'	Stadium: Kingsmeadow; Attendance: 3,679; Referee: Trevor Kettle

20 October 2015 14	Morecambe	3–1	Crawley Town	Morecambe
19:45 BST	Miller (yellow card) 39' (goal) 65'; Ellison 41' (yellow card) 89'; Beeley (yellow card) 70'; Mullin 90+2' (pen.)	Report	Edwards (yellow card) 20'; Murphy 84'	Stadium: Globe Arena; Attendance: 1,098; Referee: Darren Handley

24 October 2015 15	Morecambe	0–1	Leyton Orient	Morecambe
15:00 BST		Report	Marquis (yellow card) 24'; Payne 28'; Chicksen (yellow card) 89'	Stadium: Globe Arena; Attendance: 2,105; Referee: David Webb

31 October 2015 16	Plymouth Argyle	2–0	Morecambe	Plymouth
15:00 GMT	Carey 3' (yellow card) 42'; Tanner 12' (yellow card) 43'	Report	Goodall (yellow card) 27'	Stadium: Home Park; Attendance: 7,574; Referee: Michael Bull

21 November 2015 17	Barnet	0–0	Morecambe	London
15:00 GMT	McLean (yellow card) 88'	Report	Mullin (yellow card) 79'	Stadium: Hive Stadium; Attendance: 1,632; Referee: Fred Graham

24 November 2015 18	Morecambe	2–4	Cambridge United	Morecambe
19:45 GMT	Molyneux 21'; Wilson (yellow card) 26'; Barkhuizen (yellow card) 55'; Murphy (yellow card) 60' (goal) 67'; Miller (yellow card) 62'; Edwards (yellow card) 73'	Report	Legge 12'; Donaldson 34'; Gayle 35'; Williamson 48'; Berry (yellow card) 65'; Ledson (yellow card) 79'	Stadium: Globe Arena; Attendance: 1,689; Referee: Ben Toner

28 November 2015 19	Stevenage	4–3	Morecambe	Stevenage
15:00 GMT	Wells 7'; Whelpdale 20', 49', 61'; Pett (yellow card) 86'	Report	Ellison 13', 90+4'; Goodall (yellow card) 45+2'; Beeley (yellow card) 46'; Murphy (yellow card) 64'; Mullin 82' (pen.)	Stadium: Lamex Stadium; Attendance: 2,415; Referee: Lee Collins

1 December 2015 20	Morecambe	1–0	Dagenham & Redbridge	Morecambe
19:45 GMT	Mullin 31'	Report	Labadie (yellow card) 45'	Stadium: Globe Arena; Attendance: 1,027; Referee: Kevin Wright

19 December 2015 21	York City	2–1	Morecambe	York
15:00 GMT	Winfield 38'; Berrett 52'; Oliver (yellow card) 88'; Flinders (yellow card) 90+4'	Report	Devitt 54'; Molyneux (yellow card) 73'; Wildig (yellow card) 74'	Stadium: Bootham Crescent; Attendance: 2,769; Referee: Carl Boyeson

28 December 2015 22	Notts County	2–2	Morecambe	Nottingham
15:00 GMT	McLeod 45+1', 63'	Report	Miller 8' (yellow card) 73'; Ellison 23'; Dugdale (yellow card) 68'	Stadium: Meadow Lane; Attendance: 4,556; Referee: Robert Lewis

2 January 2016 23	Wycombe Wanderers	0–2	Morecambe	High Wycombe
15:00 GMT	O'Nien (yellow card) 32'; Ingram (red card) 83'	Report	Murphy (yellow card) 6'; Miller 54'; Devitt 84' (pen.); Mullin (yellow card) 90+5'	Stadium: Adams Park; Attendance: 3,555; Referee: Andy Davies

12 January 2016 24	Morecambe	1–1	Exeter City	Morecambe
19:45 GMT	Miller 49' (pen.) (yellow card) 56'	Report	Stockley 54'	Stadium: Globe Arena; Attendance: 1,040; Referee: Andy Haines

16 January 2016 25	Morecambe	2–1	Yeovil Town	Morecambe
15:00 GMT	Fleming (yellow card) 17'; Devitt (yellow card) 37'; Ellison 74'; Miller 80' (yellow card) 87'	Report	Ward (yellow card) 7' (goal) 69'; Walsh (yellow card) 74'	Stadium: Globe Arena; Attendance: 1,340; Referee: Scott Duncan

23 January 2016 26	Northampton Town	3–1	Morecambe	Northampton
15:00 GMT	Richards (yellow card) 27'; Collins 30'; O'Toole 40'; McDonald 51'; Buchanan (yellow card) 90+2'	Report	Fleming (yellow card) 26'; Wilson (yellow card) 57'; Ellison (yellow card) 58'; Mullin 72'; Dugdale (yellow card) 90+5'	Stadium: Sixfields Stadium; Attendance: 4,652; Referee: Gavin Ward

26 January 2016 27	Morecambe	1–2	Mansfield Town	Morecambe
19:45 GMT	Mullin 71' (pen.)	Report	Clements 86'; Yussuf 90'	Stadium: Globe Arena; Attendance: 1,047; Referee: Nigel Miller

30 January 2016 28	Morecambe	1–2	Newport County	Morecambe
15:00 GMT	Miller 60'; Ellison (yellow card) 76'; Conlan (yellow card) 86'	Report	Boden 1', 69' (yellow card) 71'	Stadium: Globe Arena; Attendance: 1,342; Referee: Mark Brown

2 February 2016 29	Morecambe	1–1	Portsmouth	Morecambe
19:45 GMT	Fleming (yellow card) 58'; Beeley (yellow card) 89'; Roche 90+4'	Report	Clarke (yellow card) 31'; Evans 40'	Stadium: Globe Arena; Attendance: 1,399; Referee: Richard Clark

6 February 2016 30	Mansfield Town	2–1	Morecambe	Mansfield
15:00 GMT	Blair 15'; Pearce 24'; Tafazolli (yellow card) 34'	Report	Ellison 1'; Fleming (yellow card) 90'	Stadium: Field Mill; Attendance: 3,090; Referee: Mark Heywood

13 February 2016 31	Morecambe	2–4	Oxford United	Morecambe
15:00 GMT	Molyneux 23'; Ellison (yellow card) 45+4'; Miller (red card) 70'; Edwards (yellow card) 90'; Barkhuizen 90+1'	Report	Roofe 9'; Mullins (yellow card) 37'; MacDonald (yellow card) 45+4'; Lundstram 71'; Hylton 74'; Bowery 80'	Stadium: Globe Arena; Attendance: 1,749; Referee: Peter Bankes

20 February 2016 32	Bristol Rovers	2–1	Morecambe	Bristol
15:00 GMT	Brown (yellow card) 58'; Gaffney 68'; Bodin 78'	Report	Devitt 12' (pen.); Fleming (red card) 80'	Stadium: Memorial Stadium; Attendance: 7,400; Referee: Darren England

27 February 2016 33	Morecambe	1–2	Carlisle United	Morecambe
15:00 GMT	Ellison 27'; Kenyon (yellow card) 85'; Edwards (yellow card) 90'	Report	Raynes (yellow card) 49'; Wyke 83' (pen.); Asamoah 84'	Stadium: Globe Arena; Attendance: 3,070; Referee: Darren Drysdale

1 March 2016 34	Luton Town	1–0	Morecambe	Luton
19:45 GMT	Marriott 76'	Report		Stadium: Kenilworth Road; Attendance: 7,153; Referee: Darren Deadman

5 March 2016 35	Crawley Town	1–1	Morecambe	Crawley
15:00 GMT	Harrold 54'	Report	Beeley (yellow card) 52'; Miller 83'	Stadium: Broadfield Stadium; Attendance: 1,697; Referee: Iain Williamson

12 March 2016 36	Morecambe	2–1	AFC Wimbledon	Globe Arena
15:00 GMT	Fleming 76' (yellow card) 77'; Devitt 80' (pen.)	BBC Report	Meades (yellow card) 72'; Sweeney (red card) 79'; Reeves (yellow card) 83'; Francomb 90'	Attendance: 1,477; Referee: Geoff Eltringham

19 March 2016 37	Leyton Orient	1–0	Morecambe	Leyton
15:00 BST	Simpson (penalty missed) 13'; Edwards 80' (o.g.)	Report	Roche (red card) 12'	Stadium: Brisbane Road; Attendance: 4,442

25 March 2016 38	Morecambe	0–2	Plymouth Argyle	Morecambe
15:00 BST	Kenyon (red card) 45'; Molyneux (yellow card) 45+3'	Report	Houghton 14'; Matt 47'; Carey (yellow card) 53'	Stadium: Globe Arena (football stadium); Attendance: 2,081 (627 away); Referee: David Webb

2 April 2016 39	Morecambe	4–2	Barnet	Morecambe
15:00 BST	Miller 1', 8' (pen.); Kenyon 48'; Molyneux (yellow card) 74'; Stockton 88'	Report	Yiadom (yellow card) 62'; Gash 70', 90+3'; Muggleton (yellow card) 72'	Stadium: Globe Arena; Attendance: 1,175; Referee: David Coote

5 April 2016 40	Dagenham & Redbridge	2–1	Morecambe	Victoria Road, Dagenham
	Labadie 8'; Cureton 30'	Report	Barkhuizen 76'	Attendance: 1,233

9 April 2016 41	Morecambe	2–5	Hartlepool United	Globe Arena, Morecambe
15:00 GMT	Kenyon 25'; Barkhuizen 87'	Report	Woods 4'; Thomas 6', 50'; James 76' (pen.); Oates 89'	Attendance: 2,005; Referee: Carl Boyeson

16 April 2016 42	Accrington Stanley	2–2	Morecambe	Crown Ground, Accrington
15:00 GMT	Windass 21', 48'	Report	Miller 12'; Barkhuizen 79'	Attendance: 2,609

19 April 2016 43	Cambridge United	7–0	Morecambe	Cambridge
19:45 BST	Berry 6' (pen.), 90+3' (pen.); Dunk 17', 26'; Williamson 29'; Roberts 45+1'; Ismail 59'	Report	Conlan (yellow card) 31'; Edwards (yellow card) 90'	Stadium: Abbey Stadium; Attendance: 3,941 (away 46); Referee: James Adcock

23 April 2016 44	Morecambe	1–4	Stevenage	Morecambe
15:00 BST	Stockton 20'; Wildig (yellow card) 57'; Devitt (yellow card) 90+4'	Report	Goodall 38' (o.g.); Parrett 45+1', 71'; Kennedy 86'	Stadium: Globe Arena; Attendance: 1,129; Referee: Oliver Langford

30 April 2016 45	Exeter City	1–1	Morecambe	Exeter
15:00	Ellison 85'	Report	Stockley 89' (pen.)	Stadium: St James Park; Attendance: 3,936; Referee: Darren Drysdale

7 May 2016 46	Morecambe	1–1	York City	Morecambe
15:00	Devitt 51'	Report	Summerfield 45'	Stadium: Globe Arena; Attendance: 1,620

=== FA Cup ===
The first-round draw was made on 26 October 2015. Morecambe were drawn away to fellow League Two side Dagenham & Redbridge.

7 November 2015 First Round	Dagenham & Redbridge	0–0	Morecambe	London
15:00 GMT	Connors (yellow card) 90+3'	Report	Parrish (yellow card) 20'	Stadium: Victoria Road; Attendance: 900; Referee: Tim Robinson

17 November 2015 First Round Replay	Morecambe	2–4	Dagenham & Redbridge	Morecambe
19:45 GMT	Barkhuizen 6'; Wildig 7'	Report	Vassell 13' (pen.), 50' (yellow card) 53'; Dunne 37'; Labadie 70'	Stadium: Globe Arena; Attendance: 1,176; Referee: Geoff Eltringham

=== League Cup ===
The first-round draw was made on 16 June 2015. Morecambe were drawn at home against Sheffield United.

11 August 2015 First Round	Morecambe	0–1	Sheffield United	Morecambe
19:45 BST		Report	Collins 90+3'	Stadium: Globe Arena; Attendance: 2,168; Referee: Steve Martin

=== League Trophy ===
The first-round draw was made on 8 August 2015, by Women's World Cup bronze medalists Toni Duggan and Alex Scott. Morecambe were drawn at home against Walsall. On 5 September 2015, the second-round draw was made by Charlie Austin and Ed Skrein. Morecambe were drawn away to Bury. The draw for the area quarter-finals was made on 10 October 2015. Morecambe were drawn away to Rochdale. The draw for the area semi-finals was made on 14 November 2015, by John Hartson and Paul Heaton. Morecambe were drawn away to Fleetwood Town. All the draws were shown live on Soccer AM.

1 September 2015 First Round	Morecambe	2–0	Walsall	Morecambe
19:45 BST	Devitt 57'; Barkhuizen 72' (yellow card) 82'	Report	Mantom (yellow card) 80'	Stadium: Globe Arena; Attendance: 1,332; Referee: Seb Stockbridge

6 October 2015 Second Round	Bury	0–1	Morecambe	Bury
19:45 BST	Brown (yellow card) 88'	Report	Goodall (yellow card) 77'; Miller 81'	Stadium: Gigg Lane; Attendance: 1,508; Referee: Mark Brown

10 November 2015 Area Quarter-final	Rochdale	0–1	Morecambe	Rochdale
19:45 GMT	McNulty (yellow card) 24'; Cannon (yellow card) 82'	Report	Mullin 17'; Miller (yellow card) 79'; McGowan (yellow card) 88'	Stadium: Spotland; Attendance: 1,428; Referee: David Coote

8 December 2015 Area Semi-final	Fleetwood Town	2–0	Morecambe	Fleetwood
19:45 GMT	Jónsson (yellow card) 58'; Ball 63'; Ryan 76'	Report	Ellison (yellow card) 54'; Barkhuizen (yellow card) 72'	Stadium: Highbury Stadium; Attendance: 1,715; Referee: Paul Tierney

== Transfers ==
=== Transfers in ===
Date from	Position	Nationality	Name	From	Fee	Ref.
1 July 2015	MF	ENG	Charlie Bailey	Academy	Trainee	
1 July 2015	CF	ENG	Tom Barkhuizen	Blackpool	Free transfer	
1 July 2015	CB	ENG	Adam Dugdale	Tranmere Rovers	Free transfer	
1 July 2015	ST	ENG	Jack Kelleher	Academy	Trainee	
1 July 2015	LM	ENG	Lee Molyneux	Tranmere Rovers	Free transfer	
1 July 2015	RB	ENG	Peter Murphy	Wycombe Wanderers	Free transfer	
1 July 2015	CM	ENG	Aaron Wildig	Shrewsbury Town	Free transfer	
5 August 2015	CF	ENG	Shaun Miller	Coventry City	Free transfer	
6 August 2015	GK	ENG	Tony Thompson	Rotherham United	Free transfer	

=== Transfers out ===
Date from	Position	Nationality	Name	To	Fee	Ref.
1 July 2015	CF	IRL	Pádraig Amond	Grimsby Town (Note: Following Amond's release on 7 May 2015, he later signed for Grimsby Town on 1 July 2015.)	Free transfer	
1 July 2015	GK	ENG	Andreas Arestidou	Free agent	Released	
1 July 2015	CB	ENG	Will Bell	Free Agent	Released	
1 July 2015	DM	ENG	Stewart Drummond	Retired	—N/a	
1 July 2015	CB	ENG	Mark Hughes	Stevenage (Note: Following Hughes' release on 7 May 2015, he later signed for Stevenage on 27 May 2015.)	Free transfer	
1 July 2015	RW	ENG	Marcus Marshall	Grimsby Town (Note: Following Marshall's release on 7 May 2015, he later signed for Grimsby Town on 29 June 2015.)	Free transfer	
1 July 2015	CF	ENG	Jack Sampson	Macclesfield Town (Note: Following Sampson's release on 7 May 2015, he later signed for Macclesfield Town on 23 June 2015.)	Free transfer	
1 July 2015	RM	ENG	Declan Watson	Free Agent	Released	
1 July 2015	CM	ENG	Ryan Williams	Brentford (Note: Following Williams' release on 7 May 2015, he later signed for Brentford on 11 June 2015.)	Free transfer	
1 July 2015	RB	ENG	Andrew Wright	Southport (Note: Following Wright's release on 7 May 2015, he later signed for Southport on 27 May 2015.)	Free transfer	
10 July 2015	CF	ENG	Jack Redshaw	Blackpool	£180,000	

Total income: ▲£180,000

=== Loans in ===
Date from	Position	Nationality	Name	From	Date until	Ref.
5 August 2015	CF	ENG	Jack Ryan	Preston North End	31 October 2015 (Recalled on 22 October 2015)	
1 September 2015	GK	ENG	Kieran O'Hara	Manchester United	29 September 2015	

=== Loans out ===
Date from	Position	Nationality	Name	To	Date until	Ref.
18 August 2015	CB	ENG	Chris Doyle	Chorley	14 November 2015	(Note: On 18 September 2015, Doyle's loan at Chorley was extended until 14 November 2015.)

== See also ==
- List of Morecambe F.C. seasons
