= Lee Molyneux =

English footballer

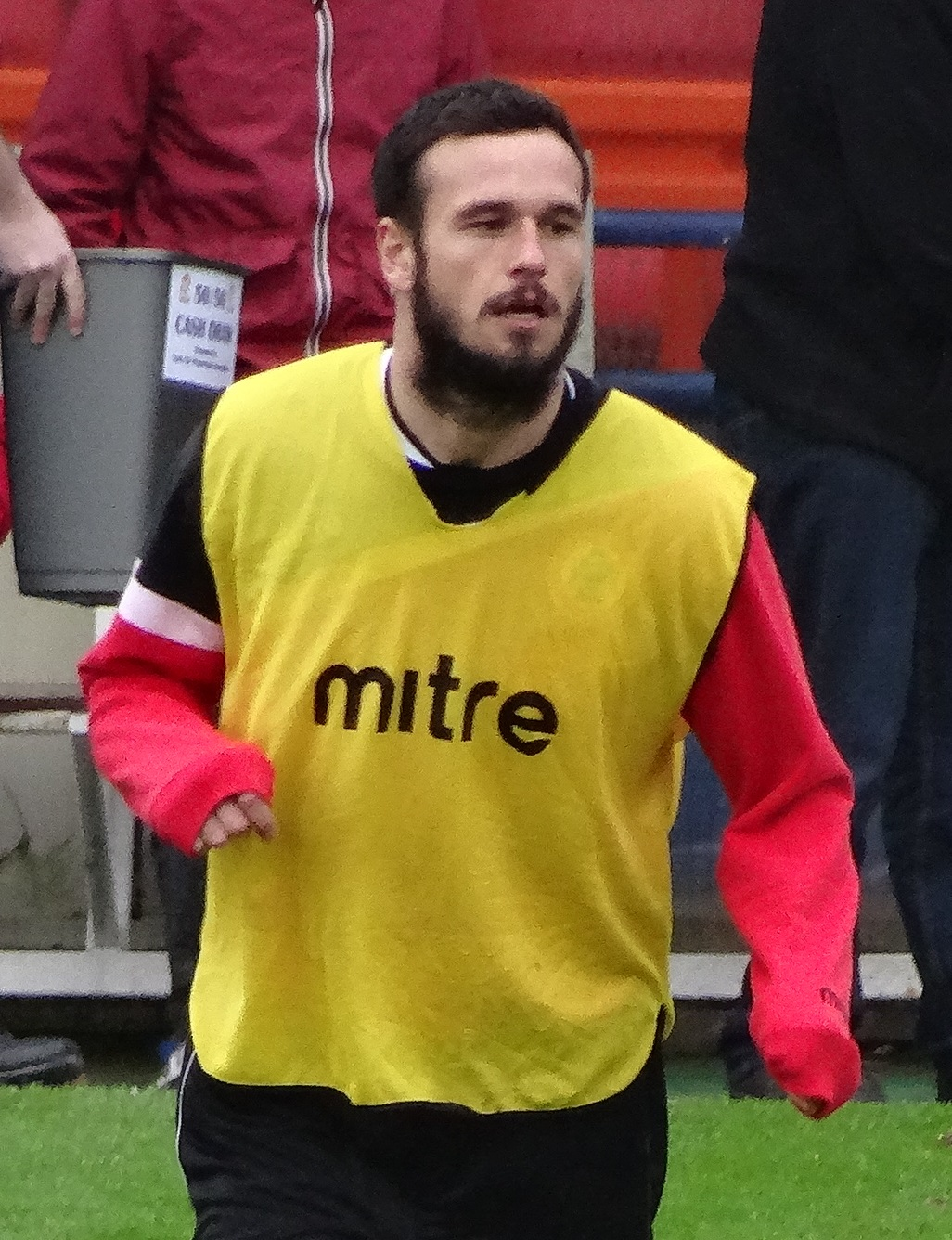
- Molyneux training with Accrington Stanley in 2014

Personal information
- Full name: Lee Robert Molyneux
- Date of birth: 24 February 1989 (age 37)
- Place of birth: Huyton, England
- Height: 6 ft 1 in (1.85 m)
- Positions: Winger; left-back

Youth career
- 1996–1998: Wrexham
- 1998–2006: Everton

Senior career*
Years	Team	Apps	(Gls)
2006–2009	Everton	0	(0)
2009–2010	Southampton	4	(0)
2010	→ Port Vale (loan)	0	(0)
2010–2011	Plymouth Argyle	9	(0)
2012–2013	Accrington Stanley	39	(8)
2013–2015	Crewe Alexandra	10	(0)
2013–2014	→ Rochdale (loan)	3	(0)
2014	→ Accrington Stanley (loan)	17	(6)
2014–2015	→ Accrington Stanley (loan)	10	(1)
2015	Tranmere Rovers	11	(0)
2015–2017	Morecambe	74	(8)
2017–2018	Guiseley	21	(2)
2018	→ Chorley (loan)	8	(0)
2018–2019	Barrow	16	(0)
2019–2021	Bala Town	17	(0)
Total		239	(25)

International career
2003–2005	England U16	11	(0)
2005–2006	England U17	6	(0)
2006	England U18	1	(0)
- * Club domestic league appearances and goals

Lee Robert Molyneux (born 24 February 1989) is an English former professional footballer.

Specifically a full back, he began his career with Everton in 2000. Having progressed through the club's youth academy, Molyneux made his debut for the reserve team at the age of 16 and developed a reputation as a set piece specialist. He represented England at under-16, under-17 and under-18 levels. He joined Southampton in 2009, where he made his first-team debut and spent time on loan with Port Vale before being released from his contract in the summer of 2010. He then turned out nine times for Plymouth Argyle before leaving the club in January 2011.

After a spell in prison for assault, he returned to the English Football League in August 2012 when he signed with Accrington Stanley. After an impressive season with Stanley, he was signed by Crewe Alexandra in July 2013. He joined Rochdale on loan in November 2013 and re-joined Accrington Stanley on loan in January 2014 and October 2014. He signed with Tranmere Rovers in January 2015 and moved on to Morecambe four months later. He dropped into non-League football with Guiseley in August 2017 and spent the second half of the 2017–18 season on loan at Chorley, where he won the Lancashire FA Challenge Trophy. He joined Barrow in July 2018 before signing with Cymru Premier club Bala Town 12 months later.

== Club career ==
=== Everton ===
Molyneux was born in Huyton, Merseyside, and was in the youth team at Wrexham between the ages seven and nine, before he joined the Everton academy. He made his debut for the reserve team at 16. In March 2006 Molyneux signed his first professional contract, running until June 2008. From the summer of 2008, he was on a month-by-month contract.

=== Southampton ===
He signed for Southampton on a two-and-a-half-year contract on 2 January 2009. He made his "Saints" debut against Barnsley on 10 January. He was sent off for two bookings against Swansea City on 31 January, four games into his professional career. The club were relegated from the Championship and he failed to establish himself in the first-team under new manager Alan Pardew. On 25 March 2010, he joined Port Vale on loan until the end of the season, having not settled in well at Southampton. However, he never made an appearance for Vale, except in the Staffordshire Senior Cup final – a tournament for the club's reserve players – and returned to the south coast in the summer.

=== Plymouth Argyle ===
In June 2010, it was announced that Southampton had agreed to end Molyneux's contract a year early, by mutual consent, with one year left on his contract. He signed a five-month contract with Plymouth Argyle on 3 August 2010, having been on trial with the club. Ironically, his first appearance for Argyle was against Southampton four days later. He was on the winning side at St Mary's. "The whole team grafted, from the front right through to the back. It was organised," he said. "We came with a plan to keep our shape, be solid, and do the simple things right, and everything else looks after itself." On 1 January 2011, Plymouth Argyle announced his contract would not be renewed. Making 12 appearances for the Devon club, he had not featured in the first-team since mid-October.

=== Accrington Stanley ===
In August 2012, Molyneux returned to professional football when he joined League Two side Accrington Stanley on non-contract terms following a successful trial. He scored his first senior goal with a 20 yards (18 m) free kick in the FA Cup on 1 December, in a 3–3 draw with Oxford United at the Crown Ground. He went on to score a hat-trick on 16 March, giving Stanley a 3–2 home victory over Barnet. He ended the 2012–13 campaign with nine goals in 43 games, and after being converted into a winger following the arrival of Laurence Wilson was described by The Times as being "League Two's Gareth Bale". He was named as the club's Player of the Year for 2012–13.

=== Crewe Alexandra ===
Molyneux signed a two-year contract with League One side Crewe Alexandra in July 2013. He lost his first-team place in October, and the next month he joined Keith Hill's League Two club Rochdale on loan. He made only three substitute appearance for the "Dale" during his time at Spotland. On 23 January 2014, Molyneux re-joined Accrington Stanley on an initial one-month loan. Speaking of his loan move, Molyneux stated that "It feels like coming home". On 24 February 2014, Molyneux signed a loan extension for the maximum of 93 days on an emergency loan deal. On 8 March, he scored a first-half hat-trick in a 3–1 win over league leaders Chesterfield at the Crown Ground, earning himself a place on the Football League team of the week.

He expected to leave Crewe in the summer of 2014 but remained after manager Steve Davis told him he had a part to play at the club in the 2014–15 season; he began the season in the first-team but again soon fell out of favour. He returned to Accrington on loan in October 2014, saying that "It seems like I have never been away... I know there is a new manager (John Coleman) now, but it just has the same feel around the place. It's so familiar and I am buzzing." His contract at Crewe was terminated by mutual consent in January 2015.

"It (Crewe) was the right move at the time but, with hindsight, it hasn't worked out but that's football and you learn."

— Molyneux speaking in October 2014.

=== Tranmere Rovers ===
In January 2015, Molyneux signed a contract with Micky Adams's League Two side Tranmere Rovers on a contract lasting until the end of the 2014–15 season. He played 11 games as Rovers were relegated out of the English Football League.

=== Morecambe ===
In May 2015, Molyneux remained in League Two by signing a two-year contract with Morecambe following manager Jim Bentley's unsuccessful attempt to sign him four months earlier. He made 40 appearances in the 2015–16 campaign, and scored five goals in 48 matches in the 2016–17 season. Despite these statistics he was released in June 2017, after Bentley admitted he made a "difficult decision because he is a player who we all really like".

=== Later career ===
Molyneux signed an undisclosed contract with National League side Guiseley on 1 August 2017. On 8 February 2018, having gone two months without a game for the "Lions", he joined National League North side Chorley on loan until the end of the 2017–18 season. Chorley won the Lancashire FA Challenge Trophy with a 3–2 victory over Clitheroe. Matt Jansen's "Magpies" went on to qualify for the play-offs with a sixth-place finish in the National League North, but were eliminated by Harrogate Town at the semi-final stage in a game where Molyneux was sent off on the cusp of half-time for a high challenge on Ryan Fallowfield. Back at Nethermoor Park, Guiseley had been relegated after finishing in last place in the National League.

In July 2018, he joined National League side Barrow. He featured 17 times for Ian Evatt's "Bluebirds" during the 2018–19 season, making just 11 starts, and was released in May 2019.

On 6 July 2019, he joined Cymru Premier club Bala Town and was assigned the "Lakesiders" number seven shirt. As the club were semi-professional, he set up his own personal training business and become a strength and conditioning coach. Speaking in March 2020, he said the team were "hungry" to get back playing after the league was suspended due to the COVID-19 pandemic in Wales. In June 2020, he signed a new one-year contract with the club. He retired from playing in March 2021.

== International career ==
He won 26 caps for England at youth level, including 11 for the under-16 side.

== Personal life ==
In January 2011, Molyneux was sentenced to three years imprisonment for a violent assault committed while binge drinking; he served 17 months.

== Career statistics ==
Appearances and goals by club, season and competition
Club	Season	League			National cup (Note: Includes FA Cup, Welsh Cup)		League cup (Note: Includes Football League Cup, Welsh League Cup)		Other		Total	
Club	Season	Division	Apps	Goals	Apps	Goals	Apps	Goals	Apps	Goals	Apps	Goals
Southampton	2008–09	Championship	4	0	0	0	0	0	—		4	0
Southampton	2009–10	League One	0	0	0	0	0	0	0	0	0	0
Southampton	Total		4	0	0	0	0	0	0	0	4	0
Port Vale (loan)	2009–10	League Two	0	0	0	0	0	0	0	0	0	0
Plymouth Argyle	2010–11	League One	9	0	1	0	1	0	1 (Note: Appearances in Football League Trophy / EFL Trophy)	0	12	0
Accrington Stanley	2012–13	League Two	39	8	3	1	0	0	1	0	43	9
Crewe Alexandra	2013–14	League One	7	0	1	0	0	0	1	0	9	0
Crewe Alexandra	2014–15	League One	3	0	0	0	1	0	0	0	4	0
Crewe Alexandra	Total		10	0	1	0	1	0	1	0	13	0
Rochdale (loan)	2013–14	League Two	3	0	0	0	—		—		3	0
Accrington Stanley (loan)	2013–14	League Two	17	6	—		—		—		17	6
Accrington Stanley (loan)	2014–15	League Two	10	1	4	0	—		—		14	1
Accrington Stanley (loan)	Total		27	7	4	0	0	0	0	0	31	7
Tranmere Rovers	2014–15	League Two	11	0	—		—		—		11	0
Morecambe	2015–16	League Two	34	3	1	0	1	0	4	0	40	3
Morecambe	2016–17	League Two	40	5	2	0	2	0	4	0	48	5
Morecambe	Total		74	8	3	0	3	0	8	0	88	8
Guiseley	2017–18	National League	21	2	3	0	—		0	0	24	2
Chorley (loan)	2017–18	National League North	8	0	—		—		2 (Note: Appearances in National League North play-offs)	0	10	0
Barrow	2018–19	National League	16	0	0	0	—		1 (Note: Appearances in FA Trophy)	0	17	0
Bala Town	2019–20	Cymru Premier	17	0	0	0	1	0	—		18	0
Bala Town	2020–21	Cymru Premier	0	0	0	0	0	0	0	0	0	0
Bala Town	Total		17	0	0	0	1	0	0	0	18	0
Career total			239	25	15	1	6	0	14	0	274	26

== Honours ==
Chorley

- Lancashire FA Challenge Trophy: 2018

Individual

- Accrington Stanley Player of the Year: 2012–13
