= Ryan Hopper =

English footballer

Personal information
- Date of birth: 13 November 1993 (age 32)
- Place of birth: Manchester, England
- Height: 5 ft 7 in (1.70 m)
- Position: Midfielder

Youth career
- Oldham Athletic
- 2010–2012: Accrington Stanley

Senior career*
Years	Team	Apps	(Gls)
2012	Accrington Stanley	4	(0)
2012	→ Droylsden (loan)	5	(0)
2012–2014	Mossley	33	(0)
2014–	New Mills		
- * Club domestic league appearances and goals as of 08:56, 9 October 2012 (UTC)

Ryan Hopper is an English footballer who played as a midfielder for Accrington Stanley in Football League Two.

== Career ==
Hopper was born in Manchester, England. He started his career in the youth team of Oldham Athletic but joined Accrington Stanley in May 2010 on a two-year scholarship. He made his Stanley debut on 27 March 2012, in a 2–0 home defeat to Oxford United, coming on as a substitute for Charlie Barnett. On 16 August 2012, he joined Conference North side Droylsden on a three-month loan.

In December 2012 he joined Mossley and later had spells at New Mills, Winsford United and Droylsden.
