= Adam Dawson (footballer) =

English footballer

Personal information
- Date of birth: 5 October 1992 (age 34)
- Place of birth: Bury, England
- Height: 5 ft 9 in (1.75 m)
- Position: Winger

Team information
- Current team: Abbey Hey

Youth career
- ?–2007: Bury
- 2007–2009: Liverpool
- 2009–2011: Bury

Senior career*
| Years | Team | Apps | (Gls) |
| 2011–2012 | Wigan Athletic | 0 | (0) |
| 2012 | → Accrington Stanley (loan) | 0 | (0) |
| 2012 | Bacup Borough | 1 | (0) |
| 2012 | FC United of Manchester | 4 | (0) |
| 2013 | Barrow | 9 | (0) |
| 2013 | Nelson | 6 | (3) |
| 2013–2015 | Leicester City | 0 | (0) |
| 2014 | → Notts County (loan) | 2 | (0) |
| 2014 | → Nuneaton Town (loan) | 5 | (2) |
| 2014 | → Nuneaton Town (loan) | 8 | (1) |
| 2015 | → Bristol Rovers (loan) | 12 | (0) |
| 2015–2016 | Kidderminster Harriers | 8 | (1) |
| 2015 | → Tranmere Rovers (loan) | 9 | (0) |
| 2016 | Nuneaton Town | 2 | (0) |
| 2016 | Eastleigh | 5 | (1) |
| 2016–2017 | Tranmere Rovers | 11 | (0) |
| 2017 | → Darlington (loan) | 3 | (0) |
| 2017–2018 | Southport | 17 | (0) |
| 2018 | AFC Telford United | 14 | (1) |
| 2018–2019 | Chester | 7 | (0) |
| 2019–2020 | Macclesfield Town | 0 | (0) |
| 2019 | → AFC Telford United (loan) | 6 | (0) |
| 2019–2020 | → Radcliffe (loan) | 3 | (0) |
| 2020–2021 | Achyronas Liopetriou | 6 | (0) |
| 2021 | Radcliffe | 15 | (1) |
| 2021–2022 | Bamber Bridge | 10 | (0) |
| 2022–2023 | Hyde United | 19 | (1) |
| 2023 | Nantwich Town | 9 | (0) |
| 2023 | Hyde United | 12 | (1) |
| 2023–2024 | Atherton Collieries | 12 | (0) |
| 2024 | Guiseley | 7 | (0) |
| 2024 | Atherton Collieries | 0 | (0) |
| 2024–2025 | Burscough (dual-registration) | | |
| 2024 | Prescot Cables (dual-registration) | 2 | (0) |
| 2025 | West Didsbury & Chorlton | | |
| 2025– | Abbey Hey | 8 | (1) |
- * Club domestic league appearances and goals as of 11:27, 28 December 2025 (UTC)

Adam Ryan Dawson (born 5 October 1992) is an English semi-professional footballer who plays as a winger for North West Counties League Premier Division club Abbey Hey.

== Club career ==
=== Early career ===
Born and raised in Bury, he attended Derby High School in the town. Dawson joined Liverpool from Bury at the age of 14 for a reported £100,000, having turned down an offer from Manchester City. Dawson spent two years back at Bury after being released by Liverpool but was then released on completion of his scholarship due to mutual consent.

=== Wigan Athletic ===
In June 2011, Dawson signed his first professional contract with Premier League side Wigan Athletic, a one-year deal, following a successful trial. In the summer of 2012, Dawson was offered a new month-to-month contract. In August 2012, he joined Football League Two side Accrington Stanley on loan along with Ryan Watson. Dawson made his professional debut for the club in a 1–0 defeat to Carlisle United in the Football League Cup, coming on as a substitute for Luke Clark. At the end of the month Dawson moved back to Wigan after making one appearance. In November 2012, Dawson asked to be released from his contract having been frustrated at the lack of first-team opportunities and the chance to move out on loan, a move he would later regret.

=== Non league ===
Dawson returned to football signing for North West Counties Football League Premier Division side Bacup Borough in November 2012. He made his debut for the club in the 1–0 home win against AFC Liverpool, in what proved to be his only appearance for the club. A week later, Dawson moved up the divisions to sign for Northern Premier League Premier Division side FC United of Manchester. Dawson made his debut the following day as a substitute in a 4–0 defeat to Rushall Olympic. Dawson went on to make four appearances for FC United, with his final appearance coming in a 1–0 win over Grantham Town in December 2012. In March 2013, Dawson was on the move again joining Conference Premier side Barrow on non-contract terms. His debut for the Bluebirds came in a 1–0 win over Dartford. Dawson went on to make nine appearances scoring 1 goal for Barrow but he couldn't stop the side from relegation to the Conference North at the end of the season. He was invited to stay at Barrow and join the squad in pre-season, however, he declined due to interest from Macclesfield Town, Bolton Wanderers, Luton Town, Morecambe, Hyde and Forest Green Rovers. In July 2013, Dawson joined NWCFL First Division side Nelson after turning down a contract from Barrow. He made a total of six league appearances for the Admirals scoring 3 goals.

=== Leicester City ===
In October 2013, after leaving Nelson, Dawson returned to training with Barrow, but a move didn't materialise. He also spent time training with Scottish Championship side Dundee, but a move was scuppered due to a registration issue. In the same month, Dawson signed for Leicester City having spent a period on trial with the club. In May 2014, Dawson was offered a new contract for the following season.

==== Notts County (loan) ====
On 7 August 2014, Dawson joined Notts County on a month-long loan. He made his debut on 9 August 2014 during County's 1–1 opening day draw with Preston North End, replacing Garry Thompson in the 35th minute. Dawson returned to Leicester City at end of months loan at Notts County, making 3 appearances in all competitions.

==== Nuneaton Town (loan) ====
On 3 October 2014, Dawson joined Conference Premier side Nuneaton Town on a monthlong loan deal, heading straight into the squad for their fixture against Lincoln the next day, where Dawson had a debut to remember, scoring from 30 yards to give Nuneaton a 2–1 win.

==== Nuneaton Town (2nd loan) ====
On 27 November 2014, Dawson re-joined Nuneaton Town for a second loan spell with the Conference Premier side, joining up with fellow Leicester City loanees, Simonas Stankevičius and Marcel Barrington. Dawson made his second Nuneaton debut in the 3–2 victory over Chester on 29 November, providing assists for 2 goals. Dawson finished his loan with 5 goals and 8 assists during his stay at Nuneaton.

==== Bristol Rovers (loan) ====
On 13 January 2015 Dawson Joined Bristol Rovers on a month long loan. Dawson made his debut against Lincoln City on 17 January 2015. Dawson put in an impressive performance which he was rewarded with man of the match. Dawson extended his loan 3 times up until 18 April 2015. Dawson made 13 appearances for Bristol Rovers producing 9 assists. Dawson assisted 17 goals in 28 games scoring 5 goals. Dawson had loan spells at Notts County, Nuneaton Town and Bristol Rovers in the 2014–15 season.

=== Kidderminster Harriers ===
On 31 July 2015, Dawson signed a one-year contract with Kidderminster Harriers after impressing during pre season, including a goal in a 1–1 draw against Birmingham City. He left the club in February 2016 after his contract was cancelled by mutual consent.

==== Tranmere Rovers (loan) ====
On 10 September 2015, Dawson signed for Tranmere Rovers on a three-month loan.

=== Nuneaton Town ===
In February 2016, following the termination of his contract with Kidderminster, Dawson re-joined Nuneaton Town. He made no appearances for this club in this spell, and left in June 2016.

=== Eastleigh ===
Dawson signed for National League club Eastleigh on a one-year deal in June 2016, but left on 7 November of the same year to return north to be with his pregnant wife.

=== Tranmere Rovers ===
Dawson resigned for Tranmere in 2016. On 23 November 2017, after making just 4 senior appearances for Rovers since resigning, Dawson had his contract cancelled by mutual consent.

=== Darlington ===
In September 2017, Darlington announced the signing of Dawson from Tranmere on a one-month loan.

=== Southport ===
It was announced on 8 December 2017 that Dawson had signed for Southport on non-contract terms.

=== AFC Telford United ===
In July 2018, Dawson signed for National League North side A.F.C. Telford United. On 12 November, he left to join National League North rivals Chester in controversial circumstances, with Telford reporting Chester to the National League for an alleged illegal approach. Chester denied the allegation.

=== Macclesfield Town ===
Dawson signed for Macclesfield Town in January 2019. He was ineligible to play for them during the 2018–19 season and he was therefore loaned out to A.F.C. Telford United for the rest of the season, but signed a new contract with Macclesfield in June 2019. On 26 December 2019, he was loaned out to Radcliffe for one month.

=== Achyronas Liopetriou ===
Dawson joined Cypriot Second Division club Achyronas Liopetriou for the 2020–21 season.

=== Radcliffe ===
In August 2021, Dawson returned to England to re-join Radcliffe following a previous loan spell with the club.

=== Bamber Bridge ===
On 18 December 2021, Dawson joined Radcliffe's league rivals Bamber Bridge.

=== Hyde United ===
In July 2022, Dawson joined Hyde United.

=== Nantwich Town ===
In January 2023, Dawson signed for Nantwich Town.

=== Guiseley ===
In February 2024, Dawson joined Northern Premier League Premier Division side Guiseley. Following the conclusion of the 2023–24 season, he departed the club.

=== Return to Atherton Collieries ===
In August 2024, Dawson returned to Atherton Collieries following a short spell with the club the previous season.

=== Burscough & Prescot Cables ===
In September 2024, Dawson signed for North West Counties Football League Premier Division side Burscough, winning Player of the Month in his first month with at the club. His performance in a Liverpool Senior Cup tie against Northern Premier League Premier Division side Prescot Cables saw the latter sign him on dual-registration in November of the same year.

=== West Didsbury & Chorlton ===
In March 2025, Dawson joined West Didsbury & Chorlton.

== Career statistics ==
As of 31 August 2016.

Club statistics
| Club | Season | League | | | FA Cup | | League Cup | | Other | | Total | |
| Club | Season | Division | Apps | Goals | Apps | Goals | Apps | Goals | Apps | Goals | Apps | Goals |
|---|---|---|---|---|---|---|---|---|---|---|---|---|
| Wigan Athletic | 2011–12 | Premier League | 0 | 0 | 0 | 0 | 0 | 0 | — | | 0 | 0 |
| Wigan Athletic | 2012–13 | Premier League | 0 | 0 | 0 | 0 | 0 | 0 | — | | 0 | 0 |
| Wigan Athletic | Total | | 0 | 0 | 0 | 0 | 0 | 0 | — | | 0 | 0 |
| Accrington Stanley (loan) | 2012–13 | League Two | 0 | 0 | 0 | 0 | 1 | 0 | 0 | 0 | 1 | 0 |
| Bacup Borough | 2012–13 | NWCFL Premier Division | 1 | 0 | 0 | 0 | 0 | 0 | 0 | 0 | 1 | 0 |
| FC United of Manchester | 2012–13 | NPL Premier Division | 4 | 0 | 0 | 0 | — | | 0 | 0 | 4 | 0 |
| Barrow | 2012–13 | Conference Premier | 9 | 1 | 0 | 0 | — | | 0 | 0 | 9 | 1 |
| Nelson | 2013–14 | NWCFL First Division | 6 | 3 | — | | — | | 0 | 0 | 6 | 3 |
| Leicester City | 2013–14 | Championship | 0 | 0 | 0 | 0 | 0 | 0 | — | | 0 | 0 |
| Notts County (loan) | 2014–15 | League One | 2 | 0 | 0 | 0 | 1 | 0 | 0 | 0 | 3 | 0 |
| Nuneaton Town (loan) | 2014–15 | Conference Premier | 13 | 3 | 0 | 0 | 0 | 0 | 0 | 0 | 13 | 3 |
| Bristol Rovers (loan) | 2014–15 | Conference Premier | 12 | 0 | 0 | 0 | 0 | 0 | 0 | 0 | 12 | 0 |
| Kidderminster Harriers (loan) | 2015–16 | Conference Premier | 8 | 1 | 0 | 0 | 0 | 0 | 0 | 0 | 8 | 1 |
| Tranmere Rovers | 2015–16 | Conference Premier | 9 | 0 | 0 | 0 | 0 | 0 | 0 | 0 | 9 | 0 |
| Nuneaton Town | 2015–16 | Conference Premier | 0 | 0 | 0 | 0 | 0 | 0 | 0 | 0 | 0 | 0 |
| Eastleigh | 2016–17 | Conference Premier | 5 | 1 | 0 | 0 | 0 | 0 | 0 | 0 | 5 | 1 |
| Career total | | | 69 | 9 | 0 | 0 | 2 | 0 | 0 | 0 | 71 | 9 |
