= Tom Eckersley (footballer) =

English footballer

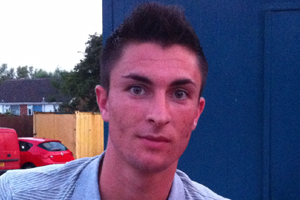
- Eckersley in 2013

Personal information
- Date of birth: 6 December 1991 (age 34)
- Place of birth: Altrincham, England
- Height: 5 ft 10 in (1.78 m)
- Positions: Midfielder; defender

Team information
- Current team: Ramsbottom United

Youth career
- 2000–2010: Bolton Wanderers

Senior career*
Years	Team	Apps	(Gls)
2010–2012	Bolton Wanderers	0	(0)
2012–2013	Accrington Stanley	2	(0)
2012	→ Stockport County (loan)	2	(0)
2013	→ Barrow (loan)	1	(0)
2013–2014	Tamworth	0	(0)
2013	→ Rushall Olympic (loan)	3	(0)
2013–2014	→ AFC Fylde (loan)	0	(0)
2014–2016	AFC Fylde		
2014	→ Witton Albion (dual registration)		(0)
2014–2015	→ Curzon Ashton (dual registration)	7	(2)
2016–2017	FC United of Manchester	32	(0)
2017	Ashton United	?	(?)
2017–2018	Radcliffe	?	(?)
2018–	Ramsbottom United	?	(?)
- * Club domestic league appearances and goals as of 16 July 2017 (UTC)

Tom Eckersley (born 6 December 1991) is an English footballer who plays as a midfielder and defender for lower-league club Ramsbottom United.

== Playing career ==
=== Bolton Wanderers ===
Eckersley joined Bolton Wanderers in 2000, progressing through the academy to sign his first professional contract in the summer of 2010.

=== Accrington Stanley ===
On 30 July 2012, he joined Football League Two side Accrington Stanley on a one-year deal following his release by Bolton Wanderers. His professional debut came on 11 August 2012, in a 1–0 defeat to Carlisle United in the Football League Cup, coming on as a second-half substitute for Aristote Nsiala.

=== Stockport County (loan) ===
On 5 October 2012, he joined Stockport County on a one-month loan deal. He made his debut for the club the following day as a second-half substitute.

=== Barrow (loan) ===
On 8 February 2013, he joined Conference Premier club Barrow on an initial one-month loan deal, Eckersley made one appearance with Barrow, before returning to Accrington Stanley.

=== Tamworth ===
On 21 June 2013, it was confirmed that Tom Eckersley had signed a one-year deal to play for Conference Premier side Tamworth. Eckersley made a quick impression for the Lambs, with 2 goals during the pre-season of 2013–14, in friendlies against Premier League sides Aston Villa and Stoke City.

=== Rushall Olympic (loan) ===
On 16 August 2013, Eckersley joined Rushall Olympic on loan.

=== Witton Albion ===
On 20 September 2014, Eckersley joined Witton Albion on a dual registration with AFC Fylde.
