= George Miller (footballer, born 1991) =

English footballer

Personal information
- Full name: George Thomas Miller
- Date of birth: 25 November 1991 (age 34)
- Place of birth: Eccleston, England
- Position: Midfielder

Team information
- Current team: Swindon Supermarine

Youth career
- 2007–2010: Preston North End

Senior career*
Years	Team	Apps	(Gls)
2010–2012	Preston North End	7	(0)
2012–2014	Accrington Stanley	29	(3)
2013–2014	→ Chester (loan)	8	(0)
2014–2018	Gloucester City	19	(2)
2016–2018	→ Frome Town (Dual Reg)		
2018–	Swindon Supermarine		
- * Club domestic league appearances and goals as of 12:50, 29 June 2018 (UTC)

George Thomas Miller (born 25 November 1991) is an English professional footballer who plays for Swindon Supermarine as a midfielder.

== Career ==
Born in Eccleston, Miller turned professional with Preston North End in January 2010, and made his senior début for Preston in May 2011 against Watford and won the game 3–1. In March 2012, Miller made his first start for Preston in a 3–0 loss to Colchester United. He came close to scoring his first senior goal for his club in this match, hitting the underside of the bar in the 15th minute of the game. In May 2012, Miller was released from the club after being told his contract would not be renewed.

Miller signed for League Two side Accrington Stanley on 19 June 2012.

He joined Chester on loan in December 2013 till 5 January 2014. His loan was then extended to 15 February 2014.

In September 2014, after impressing on trial, he signed for Gloucester City before signing on a dual registration basis for Southern League side Frome Town in January 2016.

In 2018, Swindon Supermarine announced on its website that Miller had signed for the club from Frome.

== Career statistics ==
As of 18 September 2015

Club	Season	League		FA Cup		League Cup		Other		Total	
Club	Season	Apps	Goals	Apps	Goals	Apps	Goals	Apps	Goals	Apps	Goals
Preston North End	2010–11	1	0	0	0	0	0	0	0	1	0
Preston North End	2011–12	6	0	0	0	0	0	1	0	7	0
Preston North End	Total	7	0	0	0	0	0	1	0	8	0
Accrington Stanley	2012–13	25	3	2	0	1	0	0	0	28	3
Accrington Stanley	2013–14	4	0	0	0	0	0	1	0	5	0
Accrington Stanley	Total	29	3	2	0	1	0	1	0	33	3
Chester (loan)	2013–14	8	0	0	0	0	0	1	0	9	0
Chester (loan)	Total	8	0	0	0	0	0	1	0	9	0
Gloucester City	2014–15	12	0	5	2	0	0	2	0	19	2
Gloucester City	2015–16	3	0	0	0	0	0	0	0	3	0
Gloucester City	Total	15	0	5	2	0	0	2	0	22	2
Career total		59	3	7	2	1	0	5	0	72	5
