= Charlie Barnett (footballer) =

English footballer (born 1988)

Personal information
- Full name: Charlie John Barnett
- Date of birth: 19 September 1988 (age 38)
- Place of birth: Liverpool, England
- Height: 5 ft 7 in (1.70 m)
- Position: Midfielder

Youth career
- ?–2006: Liverpool

Senior career*
Years	Team	Apps	(Gls)
2006–2008	Liverpool	0	(0)
2008–2010	Tranmere Rovers	36	(4)
2010–2013	Accrington Stanley	95	(3)
2013–2015	AFC Telford United	48	(1)

International career^{‡}
2003	England U16	1	(0)
- * Club domestic league appearances and goals as of 11:36, 6 May 2015 (UTC) ‡ National team caps and goals as of 18:55, 26 April 2014 (UTC)

Charlie John Barnett (born 19 September 1988) is an English former footballer.

== Career ==
=== Liverpool Reserves/Academy ===
In the early days of Barnett's career, he played for Liverpool Youth side, with whom he won the FA Youth Cup in 2006 and 2007, before being released by the club, having never made an appearance for the side.

Tranmere Rovers

Barnett then moved to League One side Tranmere Rovers on a one–year contract on 1 August 2008, signing his first professional contract in the process. Barnett made his debut for Tranmere Rovers away to Swindon Town, in the 3–1 defeat in League One on 9 August 2008. However, he spent two months on the substitute bench, due to manager Ronnie Moore's decision to "inject greater defensive discipline into the midfield". His handful of reserve appearances led Moore to recall him to the first team. On 24 October 2008, Barnett made his first team appearances for the first time in two months, coming on as a late substitute, in a 2–0 win over Crewe Alexandra. He then appeared in a handful of first team appearances for the side. He scored his first goal with a volley in the 1–1 draw to Peterborough United on 17 February 2009. Barnett later scored two more goals later in the season, scoring a vital goal in the derby against Oldham Athletic, when he volleyed in the opening goal of the game in the 2–0 win for Tranmere Rovers on 21 March 2009, and adding his third goal at home to Hereford United in Tranmere's 2–1 win on 13 April 2009. For his performance, he was named the club's Young player of the season. At the end of the 2008–09 season, Barnett went on to make thirty–three appearances and scoring three times in all competitions. On 17 July 2009, he signed a new one-year contract at Tranmere Rovers, ending speculation over a potential transfer move. However, in the 2009–10 season, he found himself out of the first team, due to a groin injury and appeared in the substitute bench. As a result, Barnett played in the club's reserve for the side. His first appearance of the season came on 25 August 2009, coming on as a substitute in the 65th minutes, in a 1–0 loss against Bolton Wanderers in the second round of the League Cup. However, he received a straight red card for "a lunge on Neil Austin", in a 1–0 loss against Hartlepool United on 24 October 2009. After being suspended for three matches, Barnett scored on his return, in a 2–1 loss against Leyton Orient on 21 November 2009. Following this, he spent the rest of the season on the substitute bench and only made four more appearances for the side. At the end of the 2009–10 season, where Barnett made nine appearances and scoring once for the side, he was released by the club.

=== Accrington Stanley ===
In summer 2010, Barnett was on trial with Scottish First Division side Falkirk and assisted one of the goals in the Bairns' 2-1 friendly win over Northwich Victoria but failed to win a contract, citing the club's finance. Instead, he joined Accrington Stanley on a twelve-month contract on 4 August 2010. Upon joining the club, Barnett was given a number eight shirt for the side.

Barnett made his Accrington Stanley debut on 7 August 2010 in the opening match of the season against Aldershot Town. Since making his debut for the club, he quickly became a first team regular for the side, playing in the midfield position. On 2 October 2010, Barnett scored his first goal for the club, as well as, setting up one of the goals, in a 7–4 win over Gillingham. His performance was praised by Manager John Coleman, though he believed that Barnett need to work on his fitness. He then set up two goals, in a 2–2 draw against Chesterfield on 3 January 2011. The following month on 22 February 2011, Barnett scored his second goal for the club, in a 3–2 win over Crewe Alexandra. Despite suffering injuries during the 2010–11 season, Barnett went on to make forty–two appearances and scoring two times in all competitions for the side. Reflecting the season, he said: "The amount of pressure and stress he works under and the squad he's managed to get together, he's done a really good job."

In the 2011–12 season, Barnett signed a one–year contract with the club on 25 July 2011. He continued to be in the first team regular for the side, playing in the midfield position. But he was sent–off for a professional foul in the 43rd minute for a challenge on Steve Kabba, in a 0–0 draw against Barnet on 3 September 2011. After serving a three match ban, Barnett returned from suspension, coming on as late substitute, in a 1–1 draw against Oxford United on 24 September 2011. In a follow–up match against Aldershot Town on 1 October 2011, he scored his first goal of the season, in a 3–2 win. Seven days later on 8 October 2011, Barnett helped the side by setting up two goals to come from 2-0 down with 10 men to claim a point, in a 2–2 draw against Plymouth Argyle. Over the season, he, at one point, played in the right–back position. Barnett said about the new position, saying: "The gaffer has played me a bit further forward in the last few games and I've managed to be at the heart of a lot of things we've done well, which is a massive positive for me. I am happy playing there so that's a massive plus for me if I do stay." At the end of the 2011–12 season, Barnett went on to make forty–four appearances and scoring once in all competitions.

In the 2012–13 season, Barnett signed a one–year contract extension with the club. He started the season well when he set up a goal for Karl Sheppard to score the only goal in the game, in a 1–0 win over Southend United in the opening game of the season. Barnett set up a goal for Dean Winnard to score the club's goal of the game, in a 2–1 loss against Rotherham United on 27 November 2012. However, Barnett found himself out of the first team, due to being on the substitute bench, as well as, his own injury concern. He later sent–off in the 4th minutes of the first half for a professional foul on Daniel Jones, in a 3–0 loss against Port Vale on 4 February 2013. At the end of the 2012–13 season, making seventeen appearances in all competitions, Barnett was released by the club, along with four other players. S

=== AFC Telford United ===
On 3 August 2013, he featured in a game against West Bromwich Albion for AFC Telford United, which Telford won 2–1. On 7 August 2013, it was announced that Barnett had signed a contract with Telford for the upcoming season.

Barnett made his AFC Telford United debut, where he started a match before being substituted in the 67th minutes, in a 2–1 win over Workington in the opening game of the season. He quickly became a first team regular for the side, playing in the midfield position. He scored his first goal for the club at home to Hednesford Town in a game which Telford won 5–3 to take them top of the Conference North on 1 January 2014. Barnett continued to help the side push for promotion. Eventually on 26 April 2014, he won promotion to the Conference Premier with Telford after they clinched the Conference North title on the final game of the season. At the end of the 2013–14 season, making thirty–one appearances and scoring once for the side, Barnett signed a two–year contract extension with the side.

Ahead of the 2014–15 season, Barnett was expected to make an impact for the side by the club's manager Liam Watson. However, his performance for the side this season received criticism by Manager Watson. As a result, he found himself in the substitute bench and appeared in a number of matches, coming on as a substitute. He also faced his own concerns that saw dropped from the squad. But Barnett soon got game time between late–December and January, including captain the side on two occasions. Then in February, Barnett was placed on a transfer list, having featured in the first team sporadically. At the end of the 2014–15 season, making seventeen appearances for the side, he was released by the club.

Barnett then signed for non-league side Marine.

== Career statistics ==
=== Club ===
As of match played June 2015

Appearances and goals by club, season and competition
Club	Season	League			FA Cup		Europe		Other		Total	
Club	Season	Division	Apps	Goals	Apps	Goals	Apps	Goals	Apps	Goals	Apps	Goals
Tranmere Rovers	2008-09	League One	29	3	0	0	—		—	—	29	3
Tranmere Rovers	2009-10	League One	7	1	0	0	—		—	—	7	1
Tranmere Rovers	Total		36	4	0	0	—		—	—	36	4
Accrington Stanley	2010-11	League Two	40	2	0	0	—		—	—	40	2
Accrington Stanley	2011-12	League Two	42	1	0	0	—		—	—	42	1
Accrington Stanley	2012-13	League Two	14	0	0	0	—		—	—	14	0
Accrington Stanley	Total		96	3	0	0	—		—	—	96	3
AFC Telford United	2014-15	National League	16	0	0	0	—		—	—	16	0
AFC Telford United	Total		16	0	1	0	—		—	—	17	0
Career Total			148	7	1	0	—		—	—	149	7

== Personal life ==
In July 2017, he graduated from the University of Salford with a degree in physiotherapy as part of a scheme between the University and the Professional Footballers Association aimed at preparing current and former footballers for careers after football. Barnett previously started taking degree in physiotherapy in September 2013.

Growing up, he supported Everton despite progressing through the ranks of rivals, Liverpool.

== Honours ==
- Liverpool
  - FA Youth Cup: 2006, 2007
- AFC Telford United
  - Shropshire Senior Cup 2013-14
  - Conference North winners 2013-14
