= Luke Clark =

English footballer

Personal information
- Full name: Luke Stephen Clark
- Date of birth: 24 May 1994 (age 32)
- Place of birth: Rainhill, England
- Height: 5 ft 10 in (1.78 m)
- Positions: Defender; midfielder

Youth career
- Everton
- Preston North End

Senior career*
| Years | Team | Apps | (Gls) |
| 2011–2012 | Preston North End | 2 | (0) |
| 2012 | → Braintree Town (loan) | 0 | (0) |
| 2012–2014 | Accrington Stanley | 7 | (0) |
| 2014–2015 | Witton Albion | 25 | (3) |
| 2015–2016 | Salford City | 35 | (3) |
| 2016–2018 | Curzon Ashton | 47 | (0) |
| 2020–2022 | Chester | 8 | (0) |
| 2022–2023 | Marine | 22 | (1) |
| 2023– | Radcliffe | 0 | (0) |
- * Club domestic league appearances and goals as of 23:38, 30 November 2023 (UTC)

Luke Stephen Clark (born 24 May 1994) is an English footballer who plays as a right back or as a central midfielder, most recently for Marine.

== Career ==
Before joining Preston North End, Clark was with Everton. His first appearance for Preston was on 7 November 2011 in the EFL Trophy against Rochdale, having a shot narrowly going wide, then scoring the winning penalty in a penalty shoot-out, which Preston won 4–2. Clark made his first team debut against Rochdale at Deepdale on 19 November 2011. On 28 May 2012, Preston announced that Clark had turned down their offer of a professional contract, and that he was subsequently a free agent.

On 5 July 2012 it was announced Clark has joined League Two side Accrington Stanley on a two-year contract.

On 21 November 2014 it was announced that Clark had joined Witton Albion.

In July 2015 he joined Salford City.

In September 2016 he joined Curzon Ashton He left the club in summer 2018 after accepting a job offer in London.

He joined Chester in summer 2020 on a short-term deal.

He joined Marine in March 2022 and left the club in May 2023.
